= Henbury =

Henbury may refer to:

== Places in Australia ==
- Henbury Meteorites Conservation Reserve, Northern Territory; contains the Henbury craters field
- Henbury Station, Northern Territory
- Henbury School, a school for disabled children in Darwin; refer List of schools in the Northern Territory#Other state schools

== Places in England ==
- Henbury, Bristol, a district of Bristol, formerly a village in Gloucestershire
  - Henbury School, former name of Blaise High School
  - Henbury railway station
  - Henbury Hundred, a hundred of Gloucestershire
- Henbury, Cheshire, a village and civil parish
  - Henbury High School
- Henbury, Dorset, a hamlet

== Places on Mars ==
- Henbury (crater)
