= St Mary's Church, Henbury =

Church in Bristol, England

St Mary's Church
- Church of St Mary the Virgin
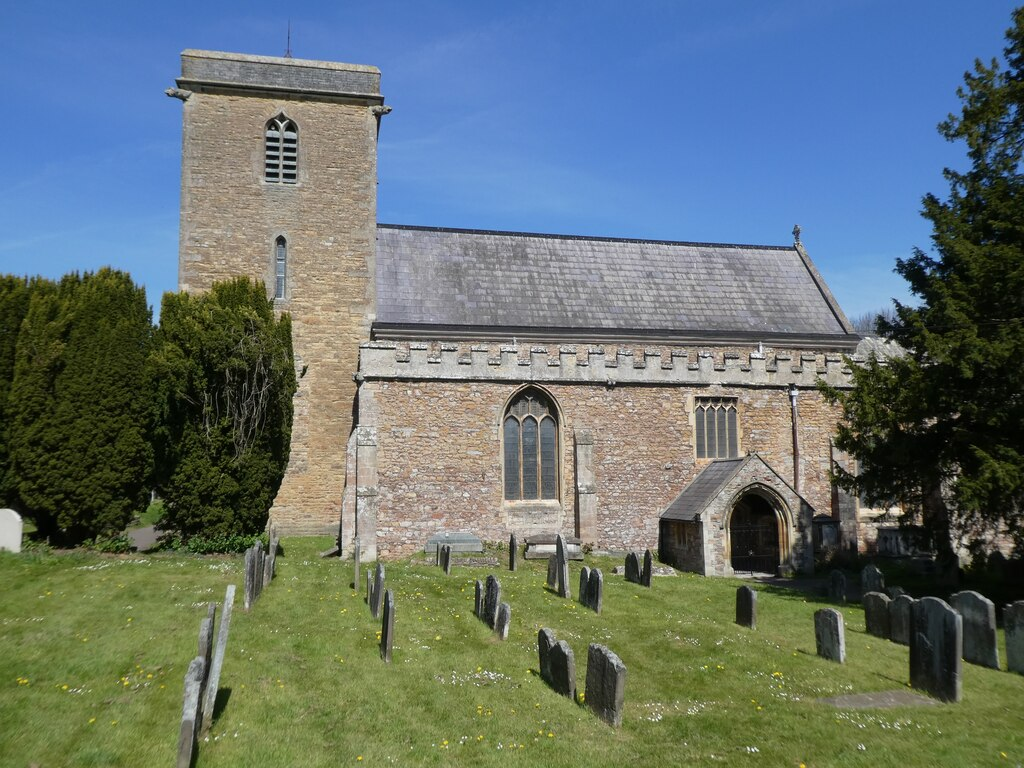
- St Mary's Church from the churchyard
- St Mary's Church
- 51.506728°N 2.631207°W
- Location: Henbury, Bristol
- Denomination: Church of England
- Website: www.stmarys-henbury.co.uk

History
- Status: Parish church
- Dedication: St Mary the Virgin

Architecture
- Architect(s): Thomas Rickman (1836 restoration); George Edmund Street (1875–77 restoration)
- Architectural type: English Gothic (Early English and Perpendicular)
- Groundbreaking: c. 1200
- Completed: 13th century

Administration
- Province: Province of Canterbury
- Diocese: Diocese of Bristol

Listed Building – Grade II*
- Official name: Church of St Mary the Virgin
- Designated: 8 January 1959
- Reference no.: 1205113

St Mary the Virgin (grid reference ST562788) is a Church of England parish church in Henbury, a suburb of Bristol, England. Located within an extensive churchyard visible from the nearby Blaise Castle Estate, the building has been designated by Historic England as a Grade II* listed building.

The site has a history of Christian worship possibly dating to a 7th-century grant of land to the Bishop of Worcester. The core of the present building was constructed around 1200 in the transitional Late Norman to Early Gothic style, with the chancel, tower, and chapels added during the 13th and 14th centuries. For several centuries, the church functioned as a prebend of the college at Westbury-on-Trym, counting the theologian John Wycliffe among its prebendary.

The fabric of the church was significantly altered during the 19th century through extensive restoration work carried out by the Gothic Revival architects Thomas Rickman and George Edmund Street. While retaining its medieval nave arcades and distinctive segmental doorways, the interior was refitted with new furnishings, stained glass, and a stone reredos. The churchyard is notable for its historic monuments, including the Grade II* listed grave of Scipio Africanus, an 18th-century enslaved servant, and the tomb of the Egyptologist Amelia Edwards.

== History ==
The ecclesiastical history of the site likely begins around AD 691–92, when King Æthelred of Mercia made a grant of land to Oftfor, Bishop of Worcester. This grant, made for the forgiveness of the King's sins and those of Queen Osthryth, included thirty cassates of land at Henbury and Aust. The early church was likely built by the Saxon Bishops of Worcester for their tenants, as Henbury Manor was a possession of the See. Around 1093 a charter of another Bishop of Worcester, Wulfstan, endowed the Henbury church and all of its tithes to Westbury-on-Trym's monastery, which Wulfstan had acquired for the Worcester diocese around that time. The earliest recorded vicar of the parish was named Alwin, who held the post in 1140.

Wulfstan's successor, Bishop Samson, died at the episcopal residence in Henbury in 1112. The church was later restored to the monks of Worcester by Bishop Simon (1125–1150). When the monastery became Westbury College around 1194, the area around Henbury became a prebend of the college. The tithes from Henbury provided a revenue for one of the college's canons, who was responsible for providing the vicar for St Mary's. In addition, the Henbury church was the other church, alongside Holy Trinity Church, whose maintenance was a collective responsibility of the college community.

Notable historical figures held these prebends, including the theologian John Wycliffe, who held the Prebend of Aust (a chapel dependent on Henbury) from 1362 until his death in 1384, although he was largely an absentee. The Bishops of Worcester, who held the manor of Henbury, frequently appeared as high-ranking witnesses to the legal instruments defining the status of neighboring Bristol; William, Bishop of Worcester, was a primary witness to the 1373 charter of Edward III, which established Bristol as a county and set its northern boundary against the Bishop's lands in Henbury. This perambulation defined the border between the new county and Gloucestershire, with survey markers following the "king's highway which leads from Bristol towards Henbury" (identified in the medieval Latin text as viam regiam que ducit de Bristollo versus hembury), reaching specific landmarks including Bewell's Cross (Bewellescrosse) and the spring of Bewell (fontem de Bewelle). This administrative relationship and the established boundaries were further recognized in 1378 when Richard II formally confirmed the city's liberties.

The college periodically received supervisory visits from the Worcester diocese, with a bishop's palace in Henbury used as an episcopal residence until the late 15th century. This was situated somewhere close to St Mary's, though its exact location is not certain. Architectural analysis suggests that the church's specific configuration of northern, southern, and western doorways, follows a design pattern typical of manorial churches structured to accommodate the specific liturgical rituals befitting an episcopal patron. Bishops of Worcester frequently stayed at the manor chapel for ordinations, and Bishop Giffard issued orders from Henbury in 1270 regarding the repair of the church chancel. The parish was severely affected by the Black Death in 1348–49, with rapid succession of vicars as a result.

Parish registers and court records from the 16th century document the disciplinary measures enforced by the church upon the local community. In 1562, a couple accused of immorality were subjected to public penance; the man was compelled to stand in Thornbury market place draped in a white sheet ringing a bell, while the woman stood as a penitent within St Mary's church before the congregation. Other recorded punishments included citations for "haymaking on a Sunday" (1597), and keeping music and dancing in private houses during evening services (1599).

When Westbury College was dissolved in 1544, St Mary's became a parish church of the new Bristol diocese. The manor and advowson (the right to appoint the vicar) passed to Sir Ralph Sadleir in 1548 and subsequently to the Astry family in 1680. Following the burning of the college by Prince Rupert's forces in the English Civil War, the Westbury College Gatehouse is one of its few surviving structures left today.

In the 19th and early 20th centuries, the vicarage was held for a long period by the Way family; Canon John Way, his father Henry Hugh Way, and his son Charles Parry Way served successively from 1830 to 1928. During the tenure of the Rev. John Hugh Way (vicar 1860–1906), significant changes were made to the parish infrastructure, including the enlargement of the churchyard (1880–1890) and the restoration of the dependent church at Aust. In 1912, the vestry accepted an offer from Arthur Robinson to install electric lighting in the church, estimated at the time to cost £31 annually to operate.

== Architecture and fittings ==
=== Exterior ===
The church is built of Pennant rubble with limestone dressings and a slate roof. The nave and lower tower date from around 1200, representing a transition from Late Norman to Early Gothic. In the early 13th century the upper tower, chancel and south chapel were added, and the clerestory was built around 1300. These features are in the Early English style, although with some restoration since.

Most notable are the Late Norman doorways, which have segmental arches. The north porch dates from approximately 1200 and features a quadripartite vault and wall arcading with interlaced mouldings. The porch entrance arch is acutely pointed with dark marble shafts and stiff-leaf foliate capitals, though some were damaged by 14th-century carving.

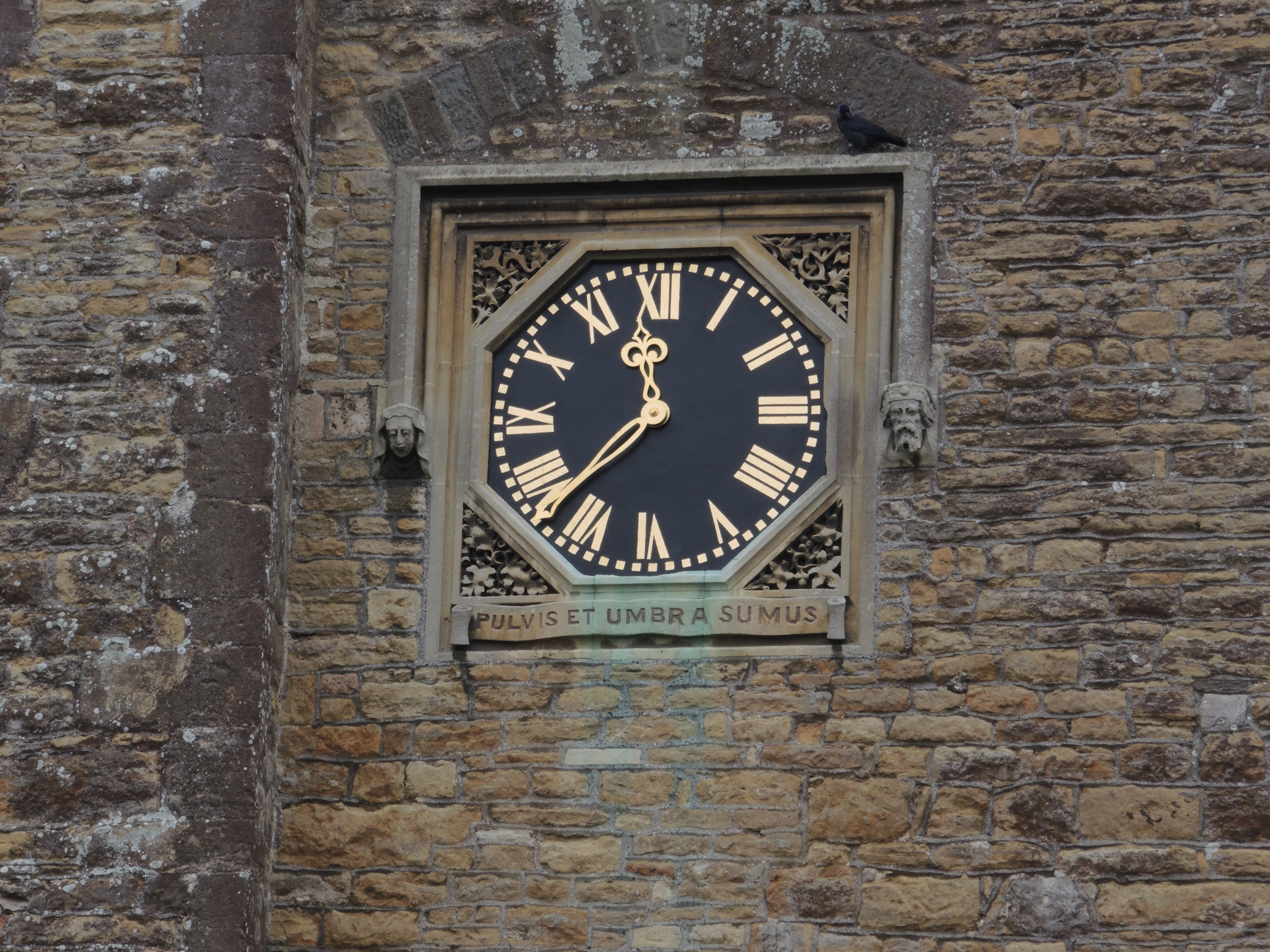
The clock on the tower of the church, with the motto "PULVIS ET UMBRA SUMUS"

The tower consists of three stages, unbuttressed and the full width of the nave. It was originally covered by a conical timber roof and lead, but was levelled in the 14th century, when windows were inserted in the upper stage and gargoyles added to the corners of the flat roof. Its lower section contains Early Gothic lancet windows, while the upper stage features ogee-shouldered windows added in the 14th century. The tower is surmounted by a 19th-century parapet and corner gargoyles, with an octagonal clock on the north side bearing the inscription PULVIS ET UMBRA SUMUS ("We are dust and shadow"). The church features a layout of three doorways (north, south, and west) which is unusual for a parish church of this period; a study of their dimensions indicates a hierarchy of entrances, where the western tower doorway is the tallest of the three, though it is narrower than the southern entrance.

In 1836 Thomas Rickman built the north chapel and carried out restoration work, and the church was further restored by George Edmund Street in 1875–77. The 19th century restorations introduced Perpendicular Gothic Revival style features, in particular the windows for the nave and the chapels. Street's work included the redesign of the chancel in the 13th-century manner, raising the floor, and installing a new east window. The extensive restoration cost between £8,000 and £9,000. The project involved rebuilding the north and parts of the east walls of the chancel from their foundations. Contractors for the work were Messrs. Wall and Hook of Brimscombe. Further restoration work was undertaken on the baptistery and the west entrance in 1878, revealing a previously hidden arch; this specific work was championed by Admiral John Halliday Cave (d. 1913) of Henbury Court, to whom a memorial tablet was unveiled on 10 May 1914 by his widow.

Prior to the 19th-century restoration, the church interior was in a poor state: the tower archway was blocked, a gallery spanned the west end, the baptistery was used for coal storage, and the nave columns were thickly coated with plaster. The restoration also involved replacing high square pews with open seating and removing a tall reading desk and pulpit.

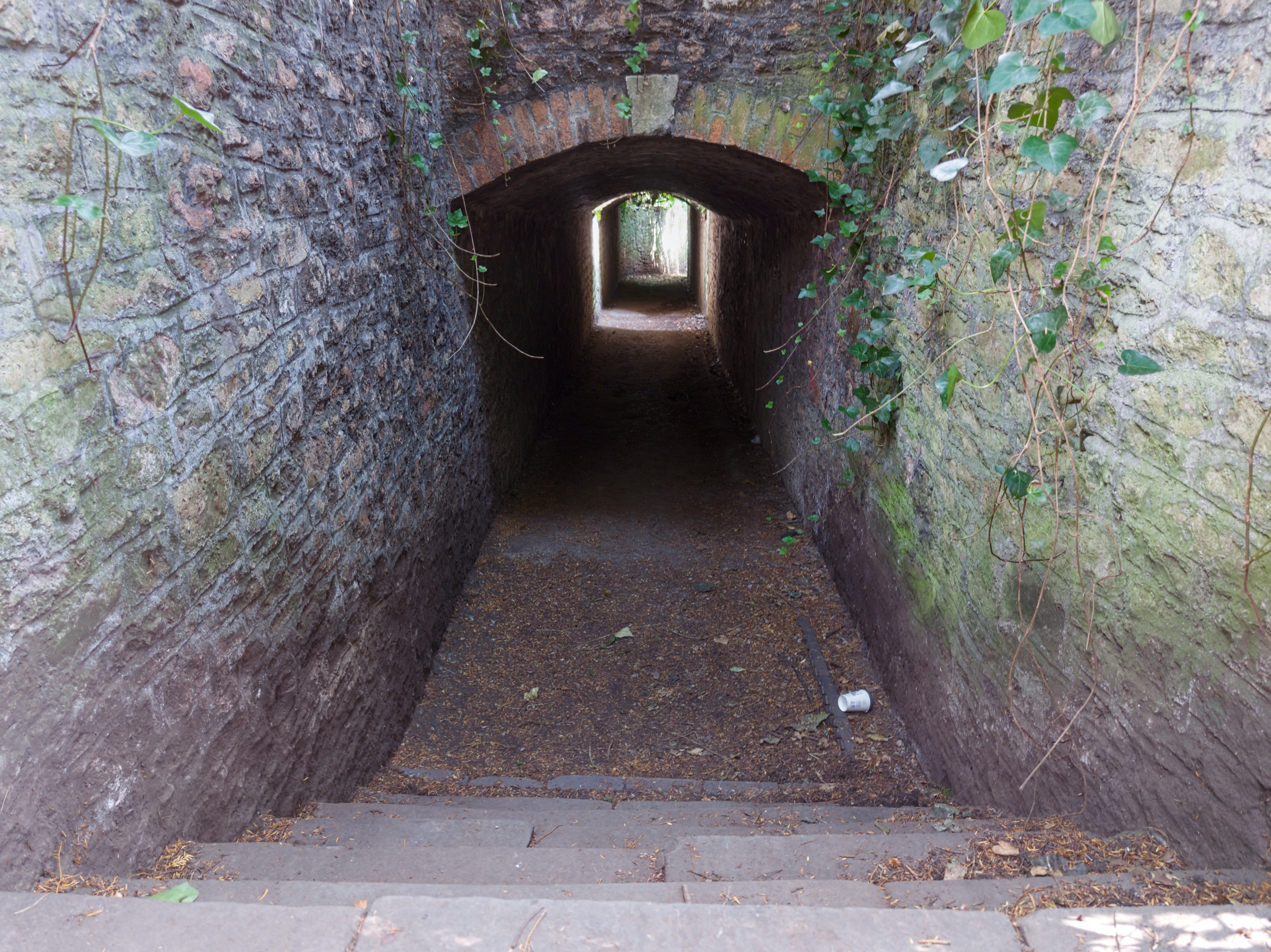
The tunnel below the vicarage

In the churchyard there is a mortuary chapel which was built around 1830, and may also have been designed by Rickman. It is in the Early English Gothic Revival style and has been designated by English Heritage as grade II listed. In c. 1835, a tunnel was constructed to allow a public right of way to go under the yard of the vicarage. This is Grade II listed and connects the churchyard to a footbridge crossing the Hazel Brook in Blaise Castle Estate. In 1975, a rose garden was established in the churchyard by Frank Gwyn, a retiring church treasurer.

==== Monuments ====
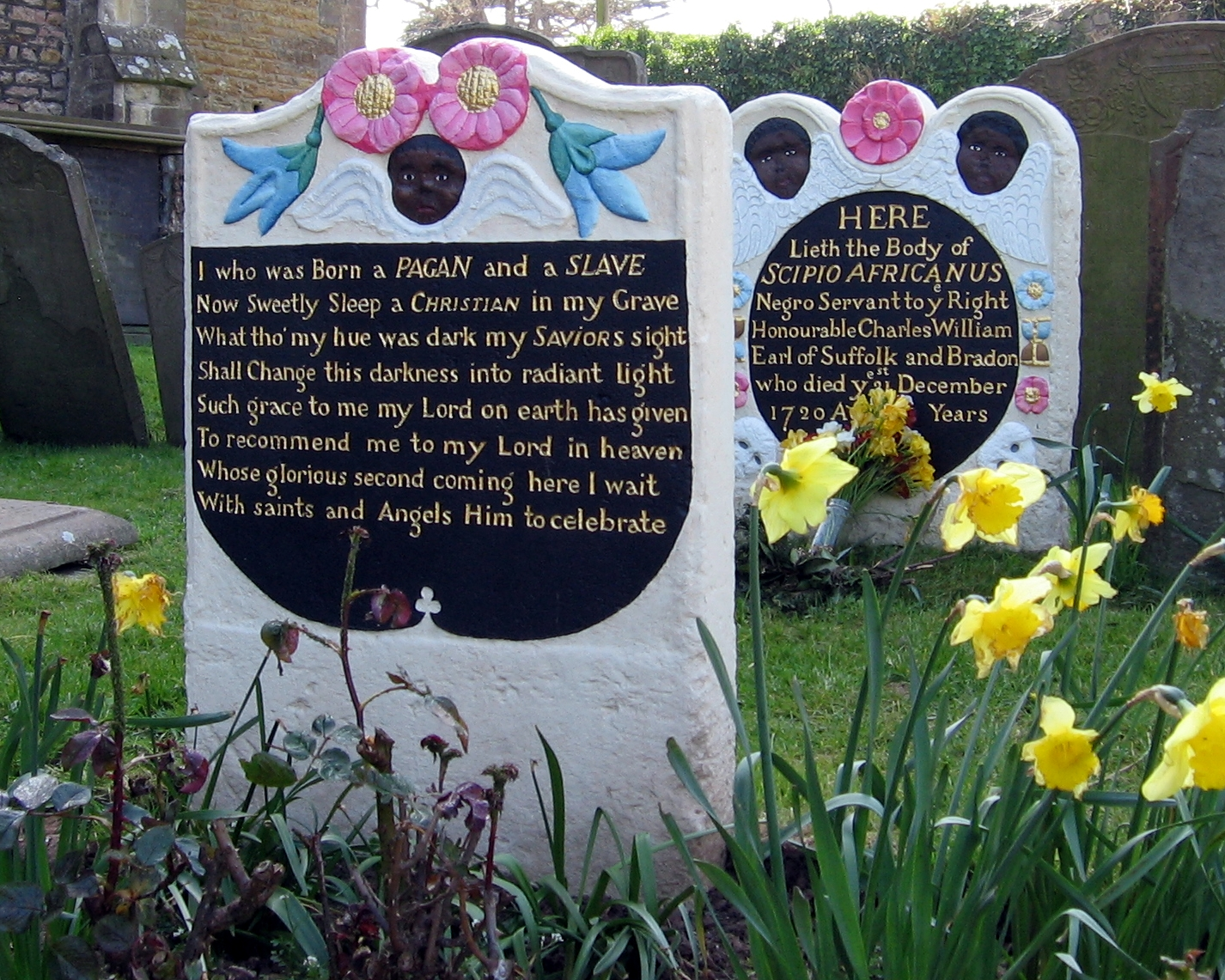
Grave of Scipio Africanus

The churchyard contains several historically significant monuments. The slave known as Scipio Africanus is buried here in a grave with an elaborately painted headstone and footstone, dated 1720. Scipio was a servant to Charles William Howard, the 7th Earl of Suffolk, who lived at the Great House in Henbury. Howard had acquired the Henbury estate through his marriage to Arabella Astry, whose family had held colonial interests, including plantations in Saint Kitts, since the mid-17th century. The grave is Grade II* listed and features black cherubs and an epitaph describing his conversion to Christianity. In June 2020, the headstone was smashed in an act of vandalism, possibly in retaliation for the toppling of the statue of Edward Colston. It was subsequently restored using funds raised by the public and strengthened against future damage.

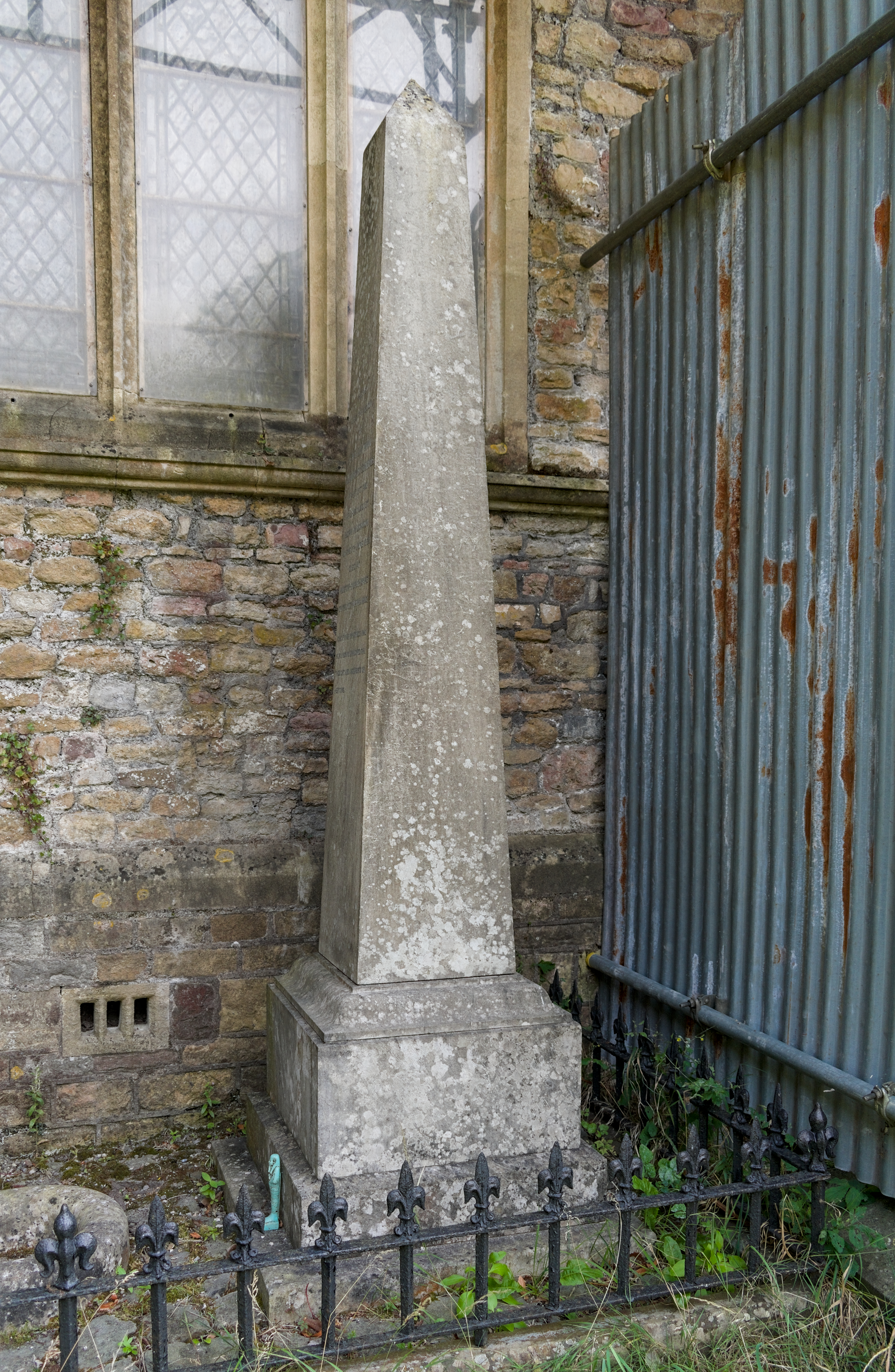
The grave of Amelia Edwards in the northern side of St Mary's churchyard

An obelisk with a stone ankh marks the grave of the Egyptologist Amelia Edwards. She lived at The Larches in Westbury-on-Trym and is buried alongside her companion, Ellen Drew Braysher, and Braysher's daughter, Sarah Harriet. The stone ankh upon the grave was placed there by the Egyptologists Flinders Petrie and Kate Bradbury as a memorial to Edwards's role in founding the Egypt Exploration Society. In September 2016, Historic England designated the grave as grade II listed, celebrating it as a landmark in English LGBT history.

The churchyard also contains the grave of Philip Napier Miles, the philanthropic last "squire" of King's Weston, who died in 1935. There are war graves in both the church's churchyard extension and its detached church cemetery. The former holds the graves of three soldiers of the First World War and one of the Second World War, the latter those of four soldiers and a Royal Air Force officer of the Second World War.

=== Interior ===
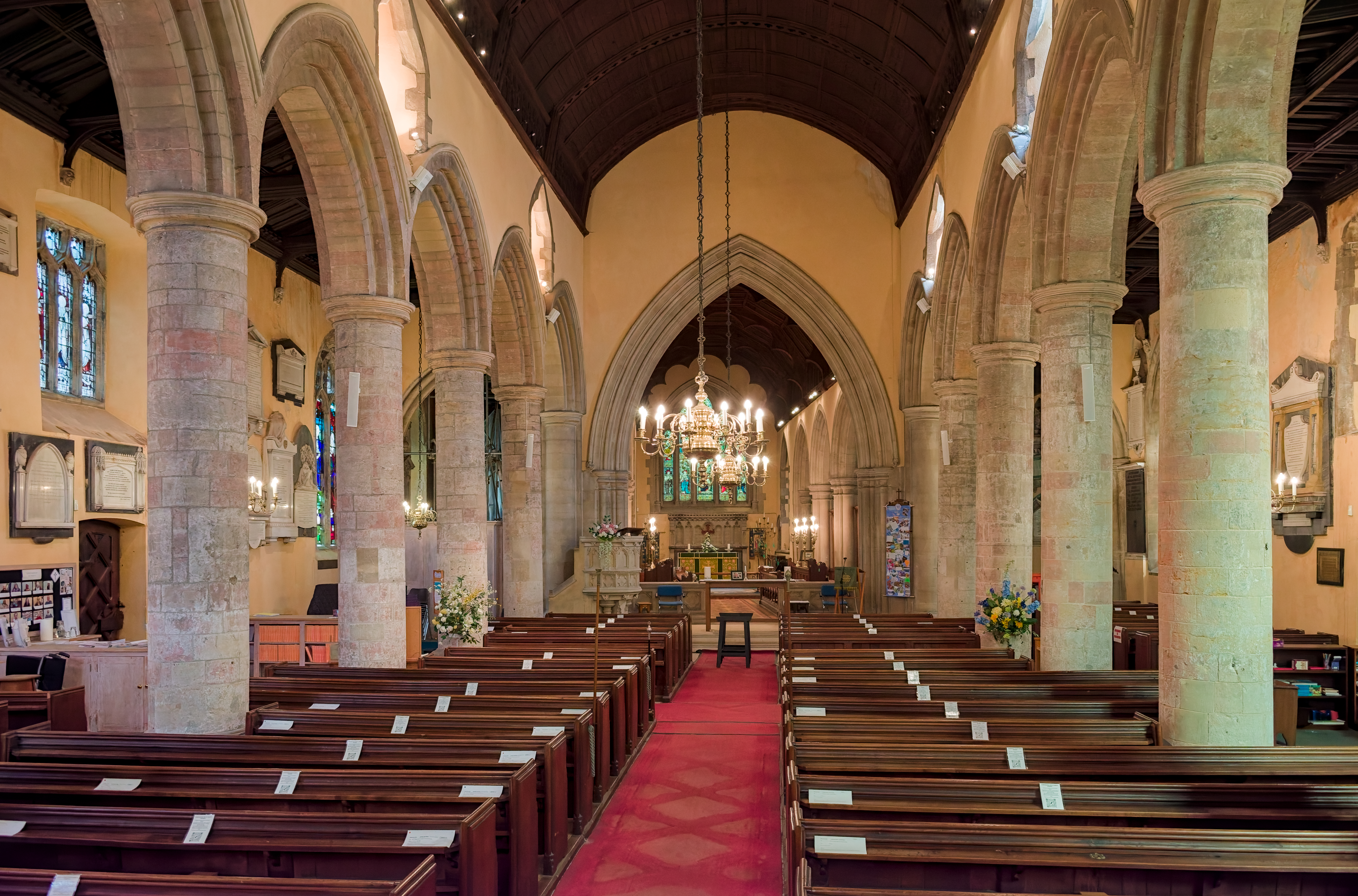
Interior looking toward the sanctuary of St Mary's Church, with the non-orthogonal layout of the building evident

The nave arcades are composed of six arches each, dating to the Early Gothic period. The columns vary slightly; the two eastern pillars were originally rounded in the Norman style, while the western responds feature small, triply shafted capitals. The stones of the pillars show scorching from a serious fire that occurred around the end of the 12th century. The chancel arch was widened during the 19th-century restorations, and the chancel itself has a marked northward slant, likely following the foundations of an earlier building. The clerestory windows, added c. 1300, have wide trefoil-headed rere-arches.

The interior fittings include a 13th-century piscina in the sanctuary and Georgian candelabra. The font, made of black marble, was installed in 1806, replacing the medieval font now located in the churchyard. The pulpit and vestry are constructed of Painswick stone, added during the Victorian restorations. A coat of arms of William IV dates from the 1835–36 restoration. Much of the other interior fitting dates from the 1877–78 restoration. The stone pulpit and reredos were sculpted by Thomas Earp of Lambeth to designs prepared by the architect G. E. Street. A brass eagle lectern was also introduced at this time.

==== Church monuments ====
There are numerous monuments within the church. A significant discovery was made in 2014 when a marble monument to Elizabeth Southwell (died 1684) was identified as a work by the Grinling Gibbons by the Kings Weston Action Group. Other monuments commemorate the Southwell family of Kings Weston House, including Sir Robert Southwell (died 1702), the Astry family of the Great House, and the merchant Edward Capell. A monument to St. John Astry (died 1712) features Corinthian pilasters and cherubs.

Historical connections to the transatlantic slave trade are also evident. The church contains memorials to the Daniel family, including Thomas Daniel, a wealthy merchant and slave owner. In October 2025, a plaque was unveiled in the church to commemorate John Isaac and others enslaved by the Daniel family, following a campaign by descendants and the Diocese of Bristol to acknowledge this history.

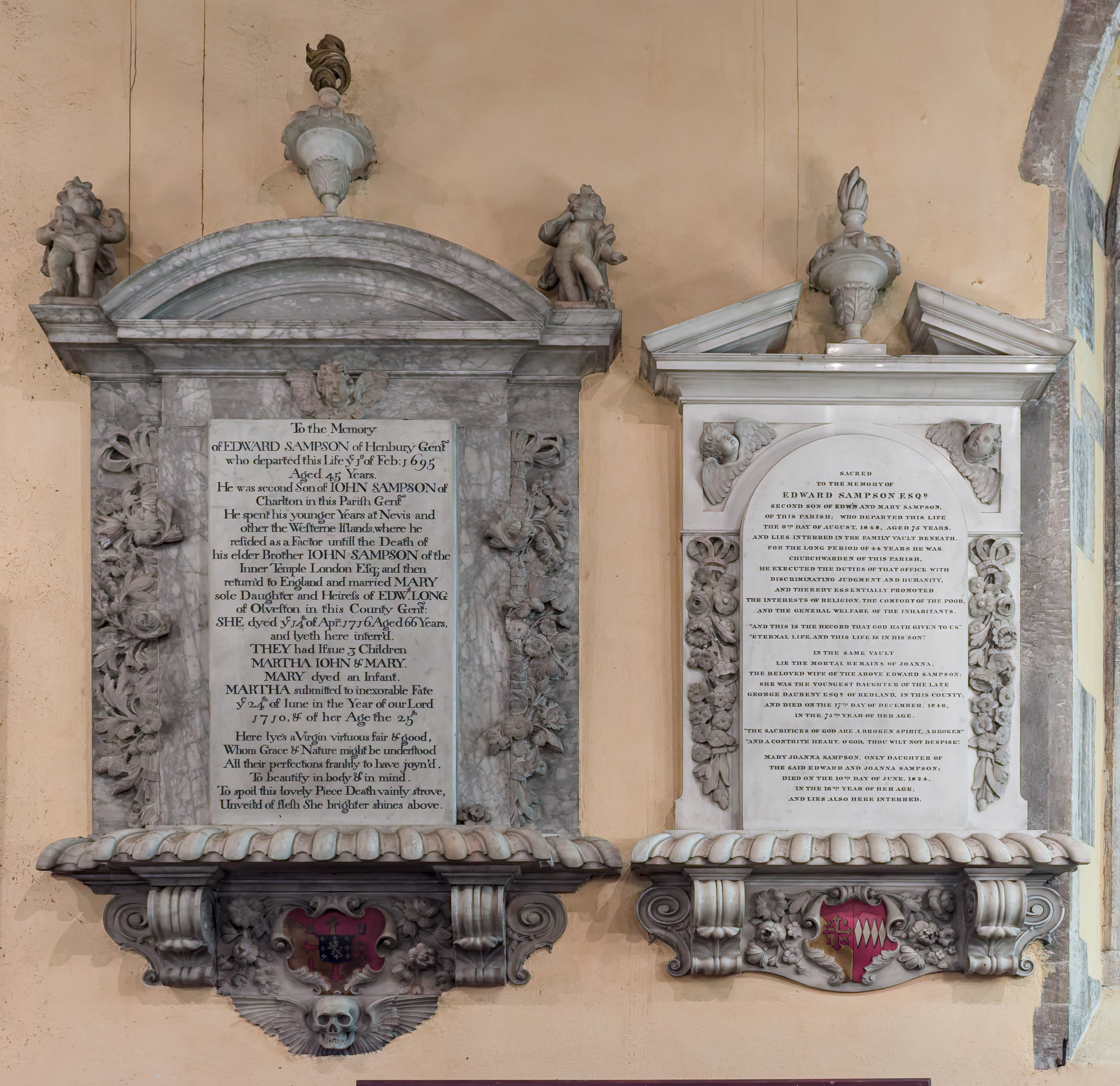
Monuments to the Sampson family

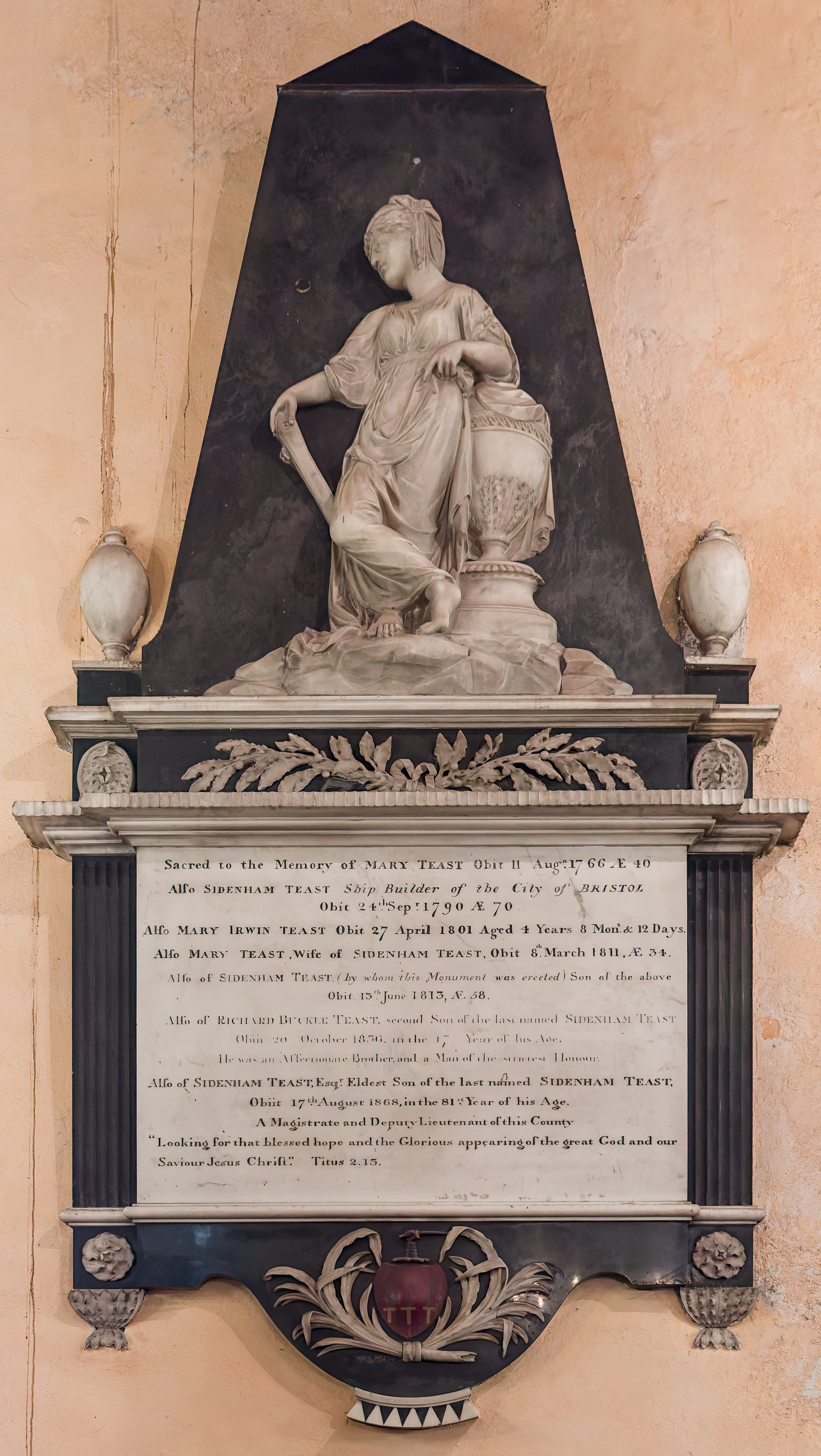
Monument to the Teast family

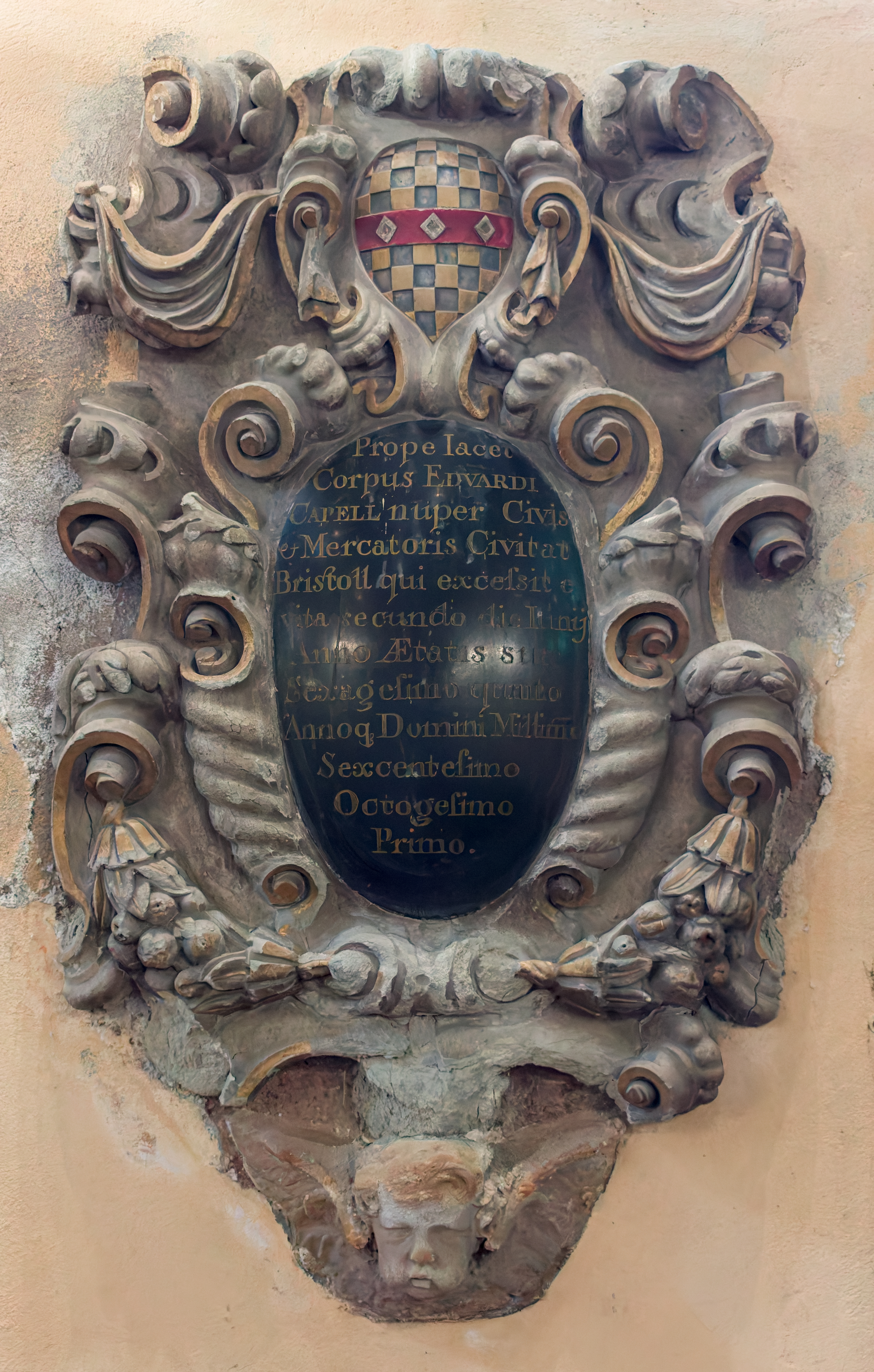
Monument to Edward Capell

==== Stained glass ====
Most of the stained glass in the church dates from the 19th century restorations or later. The east window, installed in 1878, is by Daniel Bell and was erected in memory of J. P. Harford. The two south windows in the chancel were executed by Clayton and Bell. The east window of the south chapel contains Munich glass, gifted by Belinda Sampson in 1878.

Other notable windows include:

- A window on the north side of the chancel depicting Christ, the Virgin Mary, and the Evangelists, dedicated to Cheverton Heywood Lyne (curate 1867–1869).
- A window on the south side of the chancel illustrating various saints, in memory of Anne Fisher (1876).
- A window in the south wall at the east end dedicated to a Mrs. Butterworth.
- A window in the south aisle in memory of Clarissa Miles (died 1868).
- A window dedicated to George S. Edwards and Ann Edwards (died 1867).
- A window at the west end of the north wall of the nave in memory of Mary Ann Lavina Sampson (1870).
- A four-light memorial window dedicated to Kenyon Robinson, installed in 1915. This window depicts angels and figures representing Wisdom, Industry, Chivalry, and Enterprise, and was designed by the Bristol artist Arnold Wathen Robinson.
- A 14th-century Flemish glass fragment was formerly fixed in a small opening above the chancel arch but was moved to the vestry during the 19th-century restoration.

In 1979, the church suffered vandalism which resulted in approximately £400 worth of damage to a stained glass window.

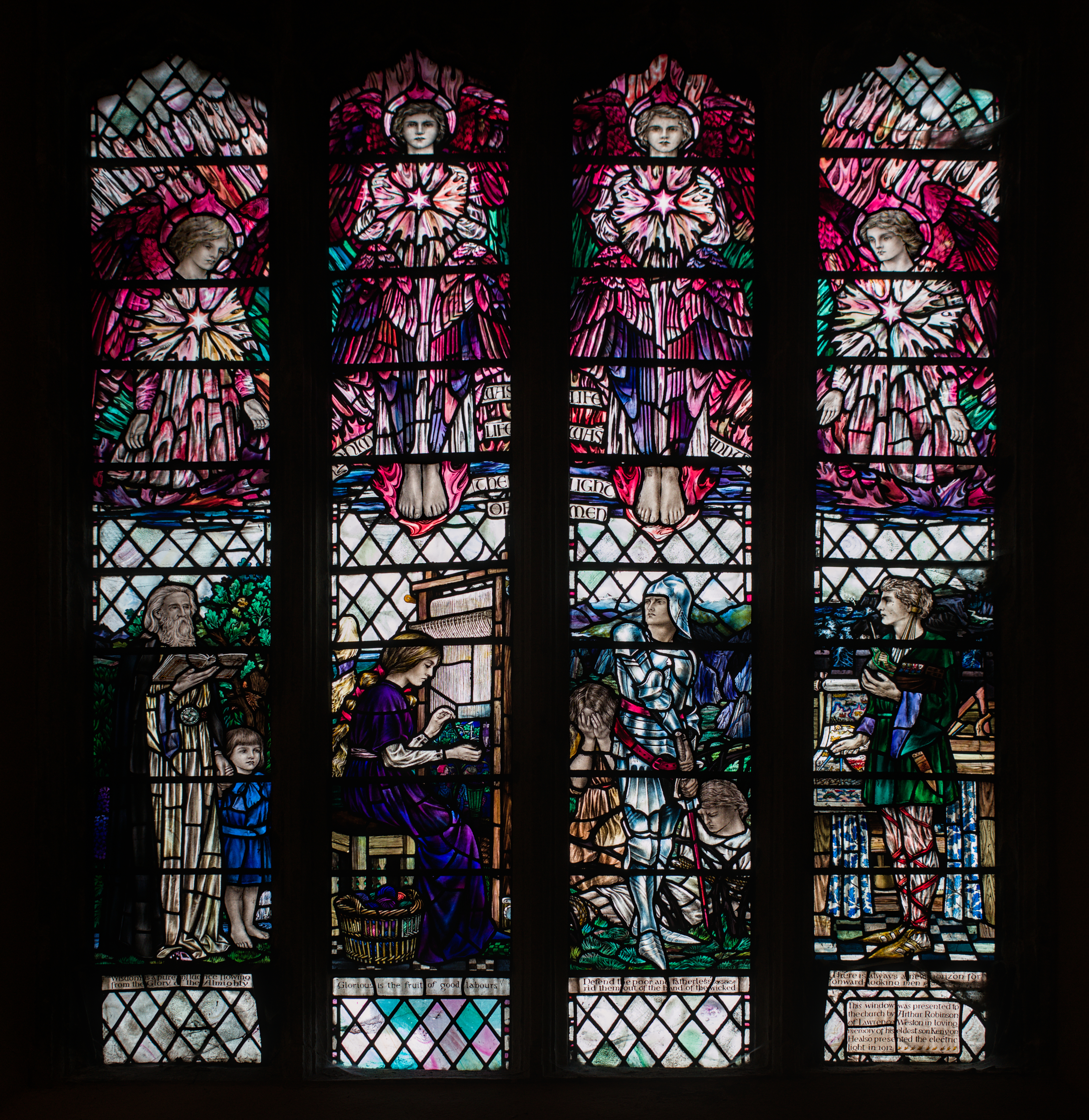
Kenyon Robinson window, Arnold Wathen Robinson, 1914

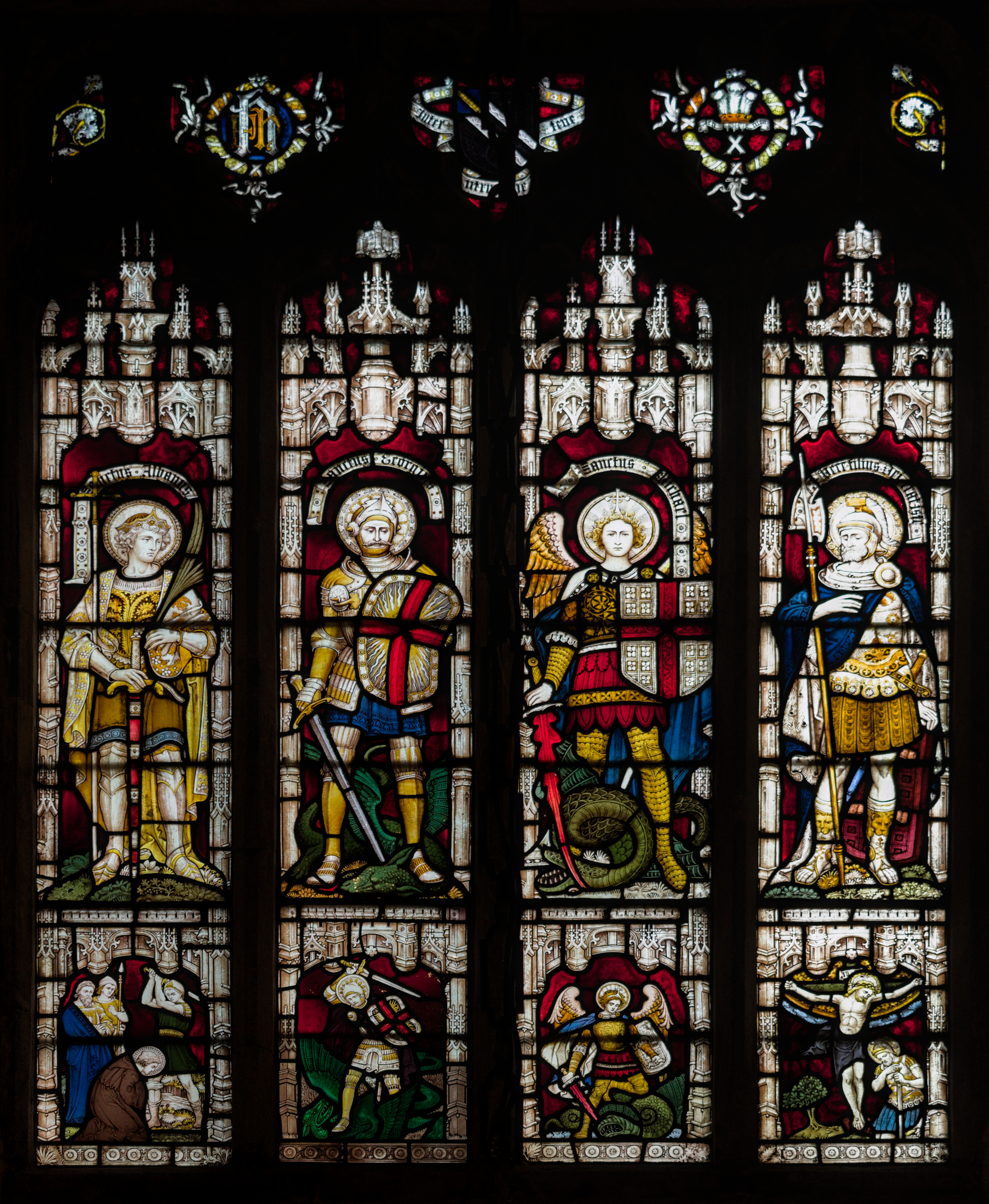
Window depicting Saints Alban, George, Michael, and Longinus

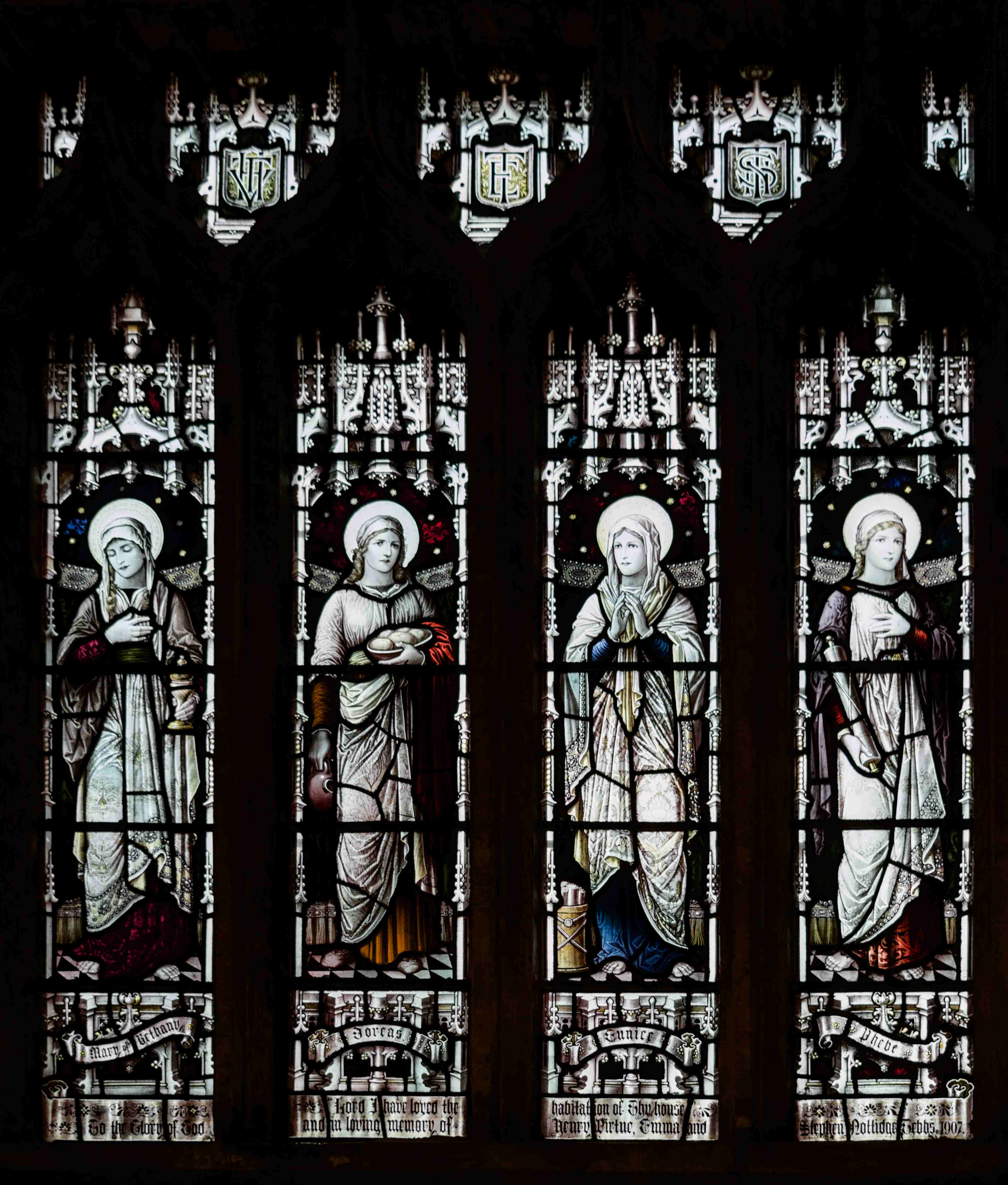
Emma and Stephen Nottidge Tebbs window

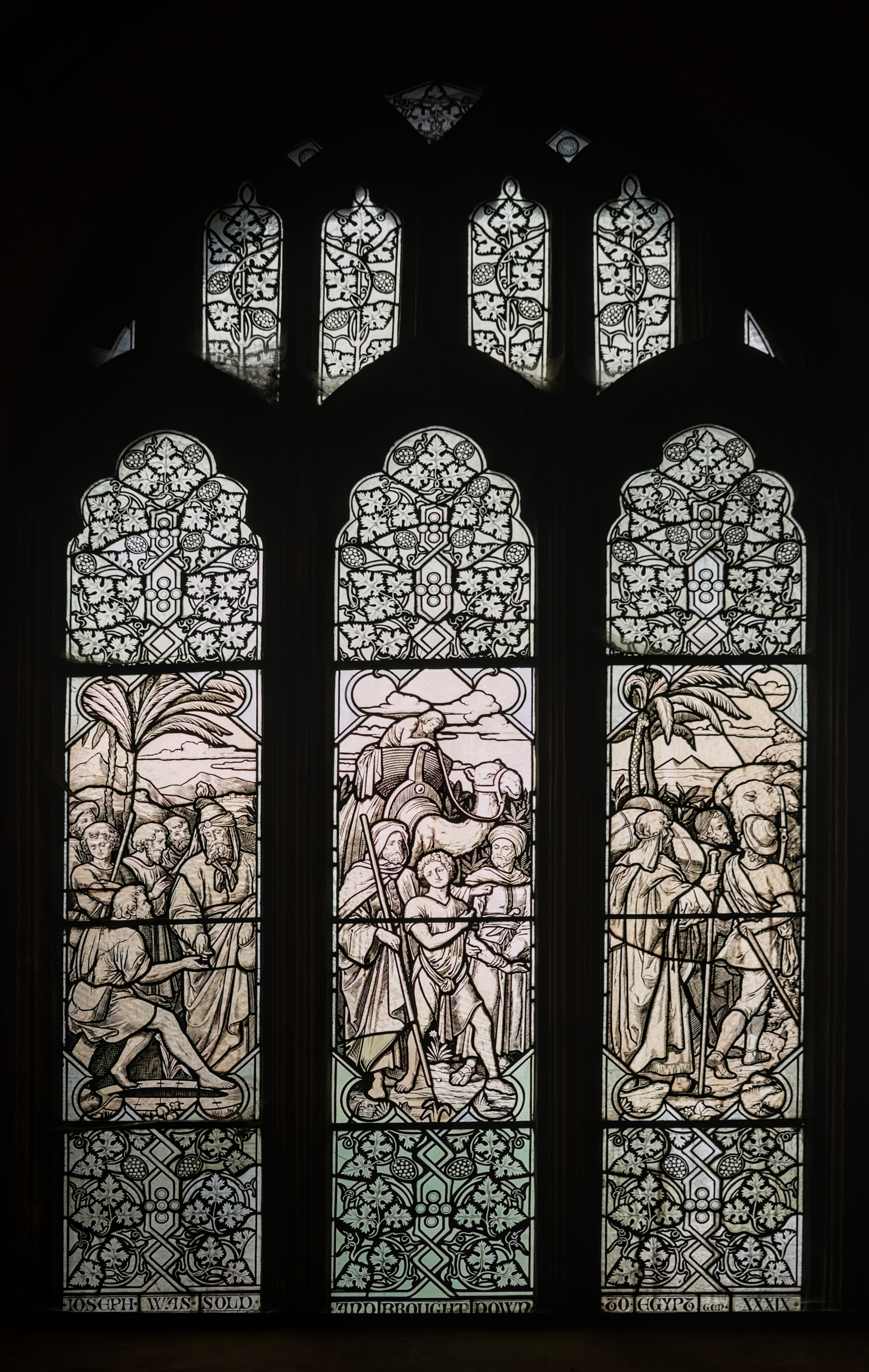
West window in the south aisle

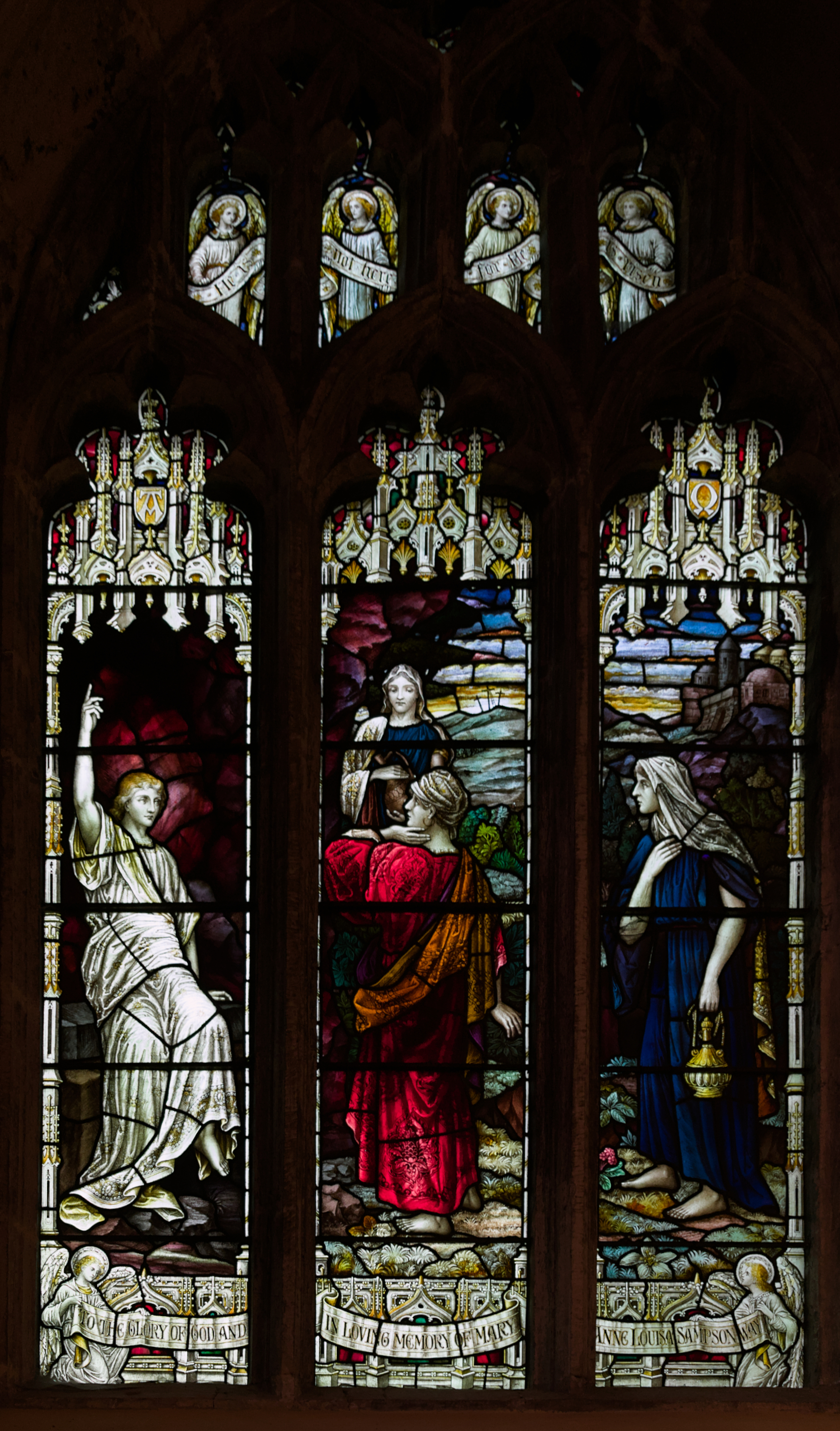
Mary Anne Louisa Sampson-Way window

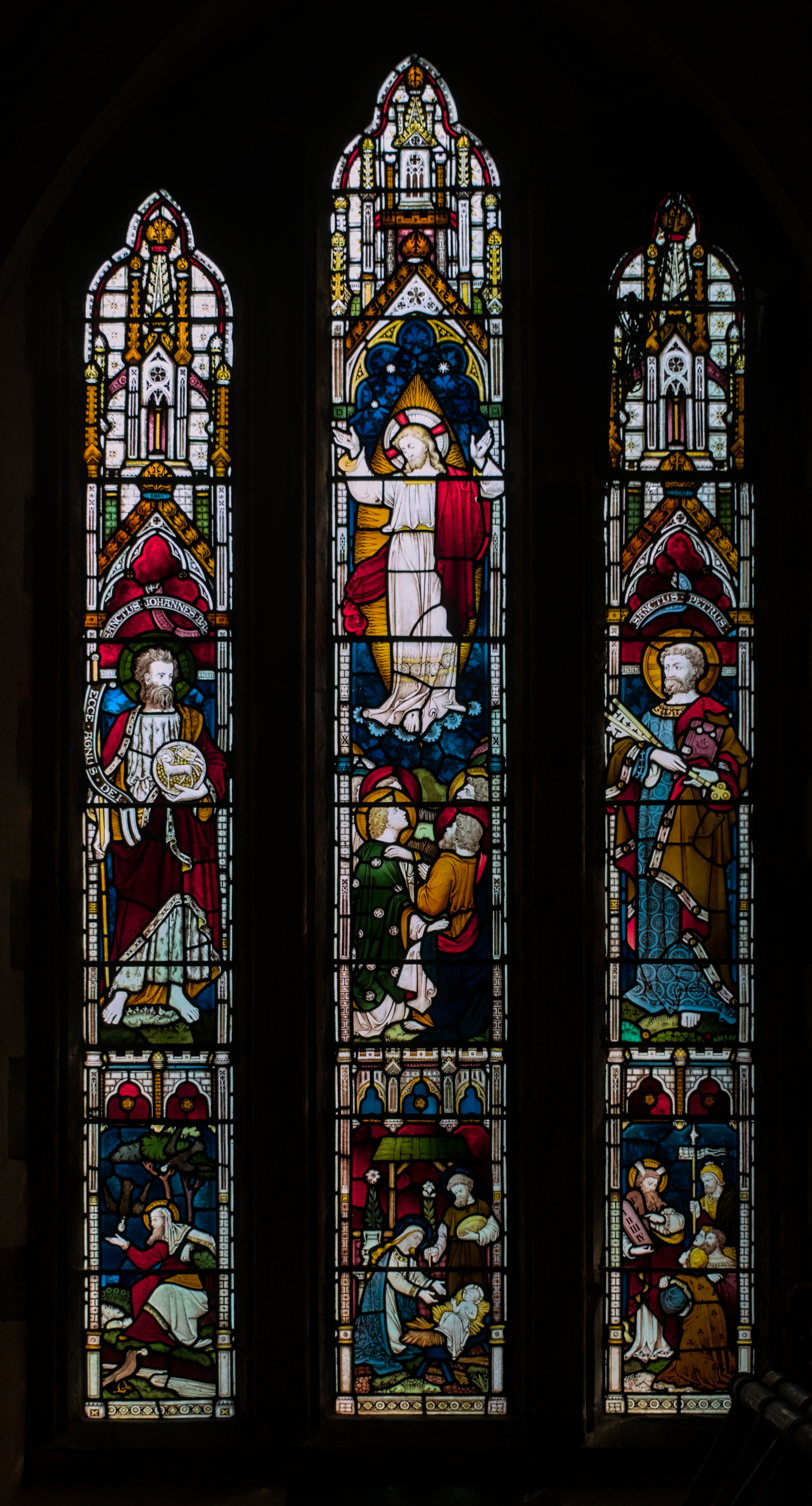
Sanctuary window

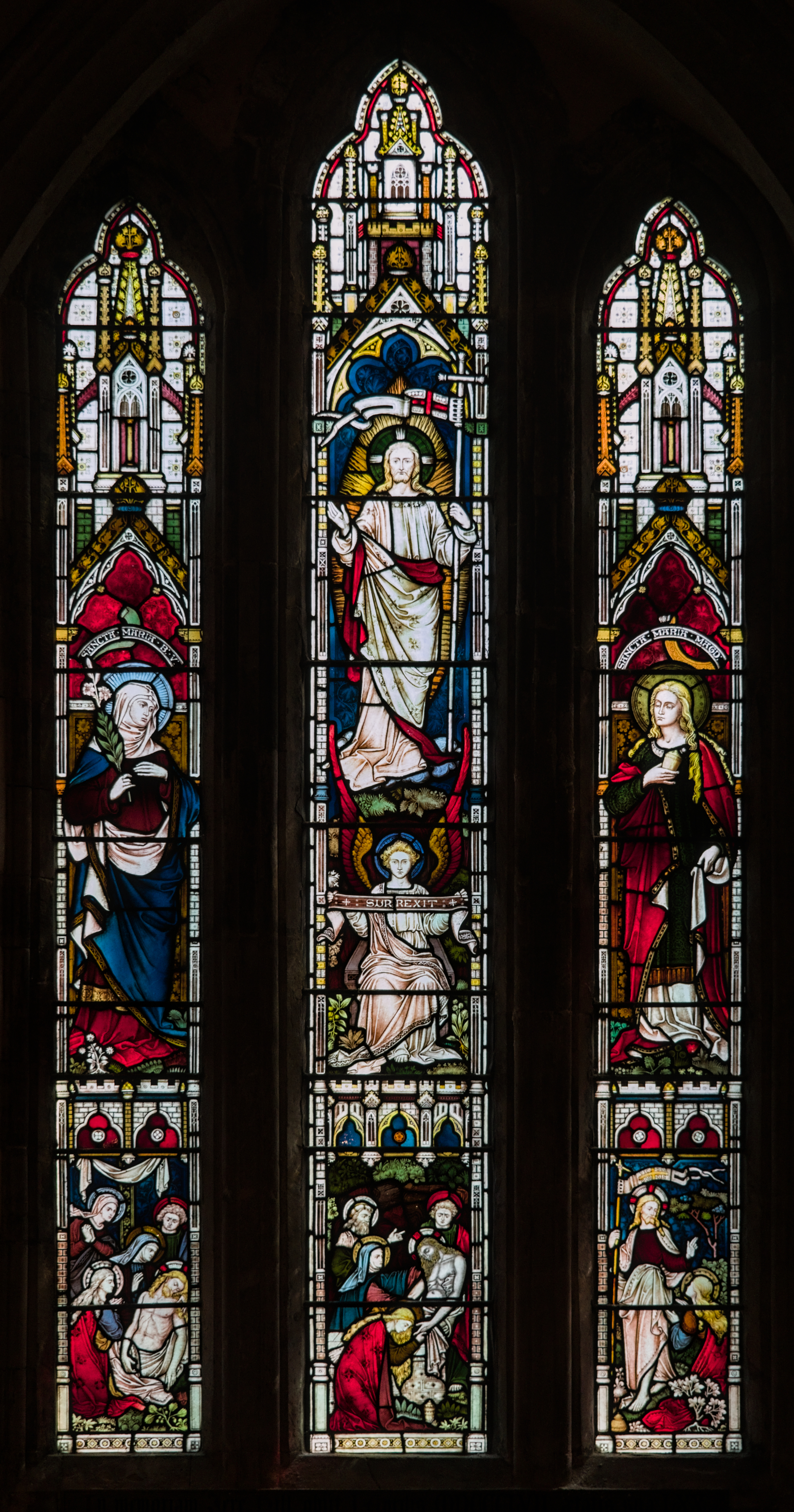
Sanctuary window

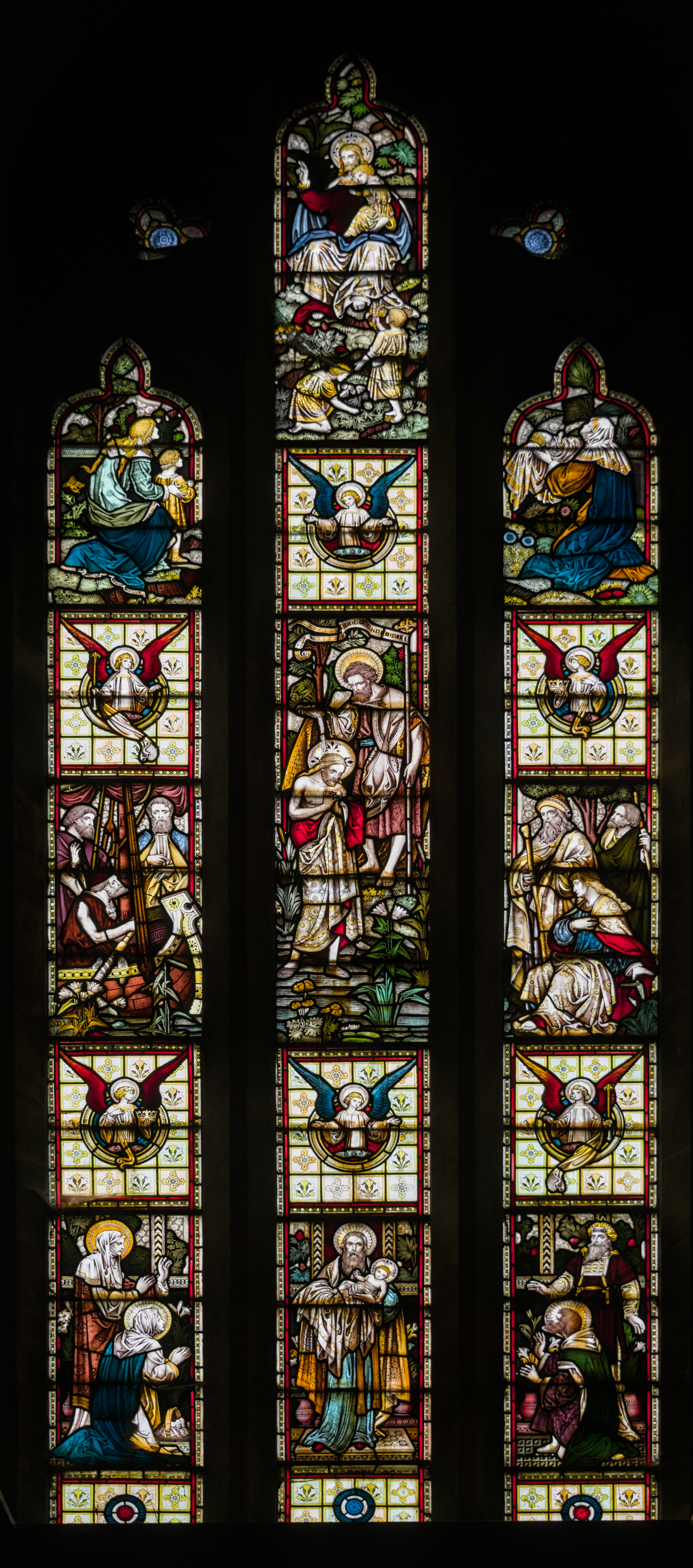
West porch window in the towerspace

==== Organ ====
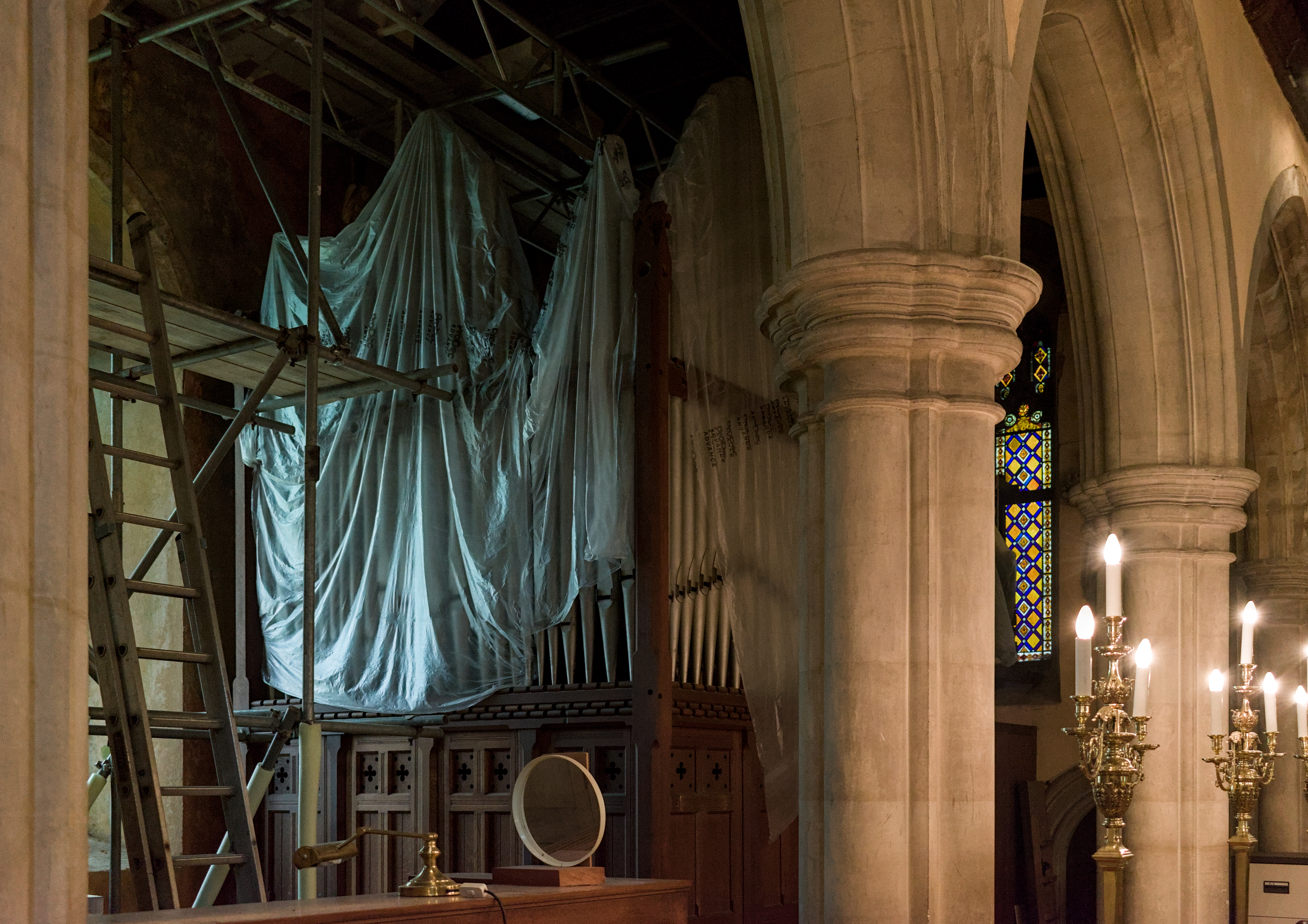
The organ during refurbishment work in 2025

The organ is located in the north chancel chapel. Originally built by G. P. England of London in the early 19th century, it was restored and re-cased in oak by W. G. Vowles of Bristol during the 1878 renovations. The instrument underwent a major rebuild by Scovell & Lewis of Edinburgh in 1907. Subsequent work was carried out by Percy Daniel in 1961, and a comprehensive overhaul with the installation of solid-state transmission was completed by The Clevedon Group in 2008–09.

==== Tower ====
The tower houses a ring of eight bells. Two of the bells date from 1717 and were cast by Evan Evans of Chepstow. In 1857, the ring was augmented by new bells supplied by John Warner & Sons (though contemporary reports credited Hale & Sons of Bristol). The current ring includes two trebles cast by John Taylor & Co in 1897, and a fifth bell recast by Warners in 1914. The bells hang in a steel frame installed by Warner in 1914. Architectural graffiti has also been documented in the tower, including daisy wheels (apotropaic marks or witch marks in the form of hexafoils), a pentagram, and a Marian "M" symbol carved into the stone staircase.

== Archives ==
Parish records for St Mary's church, Henbury, Bristol are held at Bristol Archives (Ref. P.Hen) (online catalogue) including baptism, marriage and burial registers. The archive also includes records of the incumbent, churchwardens, overseers of the poor, parochial church council, charities, schools and societies plus deeds, plans and photographs.

== See also ==
- List of churches in Bristol
- Grade II* listed buildings in Bristol
