= Scipio Africanus (enslaved person) =

West African British slave

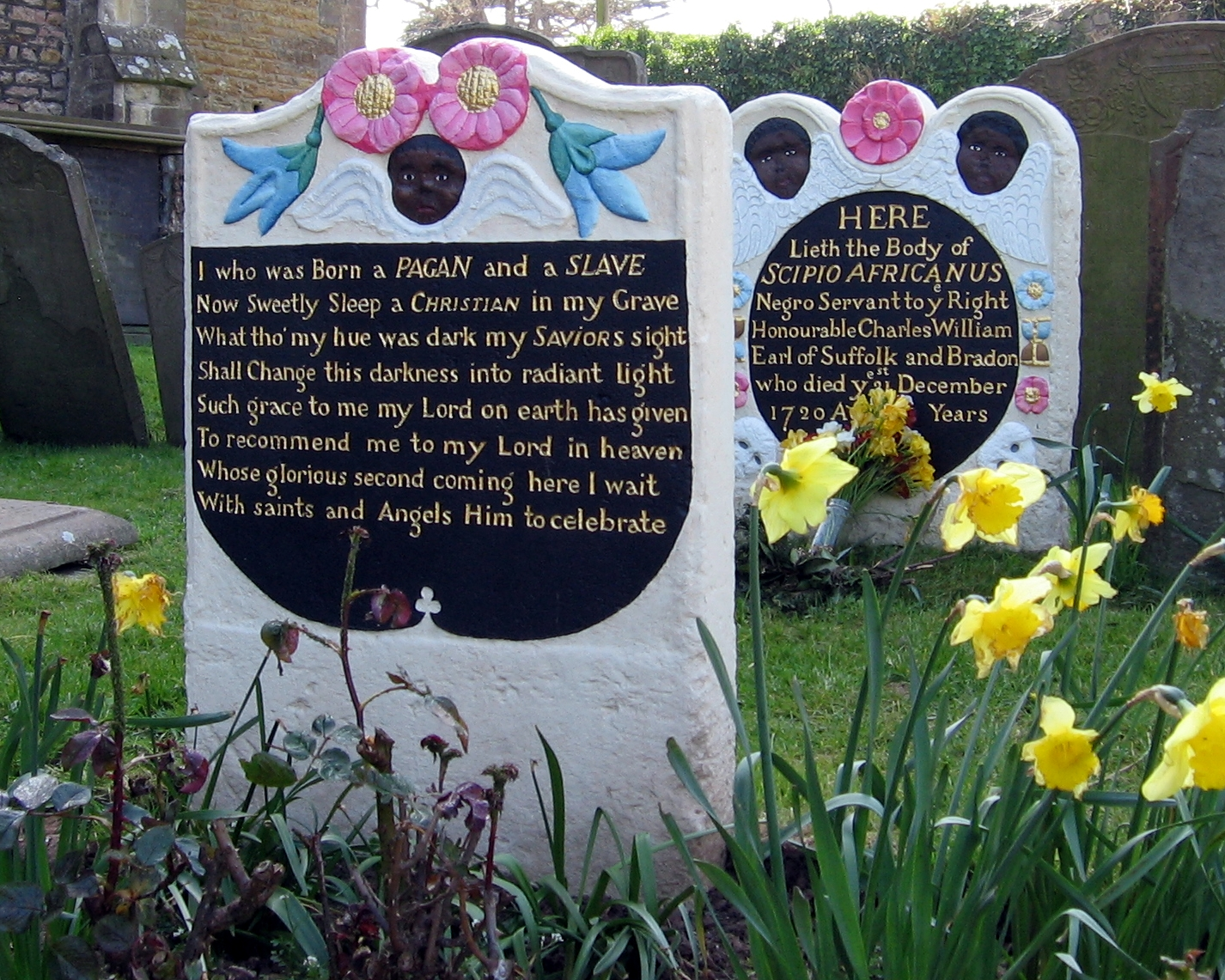
The grave of Scipio Africanus, Henbury, Bristol, England

Scipio Africanus (c. 1702 – 21 December 1720) was a former enslaved person born to unknown parents from West Africa. He was named after Publius Cornelius Scipio Africanus (236/235–183 BC), the famous Roman general who defeated the Carthaginian military leader Hannibal.

== Life ==
Very little is known of Africanus' life. He was formerly enslaved (since as the courts were to hold in Somersett's Case (1772), slavery did not exist in Great Britain under English common law) in the household of Charles William Howard, 7th Earl of Suffolk, who lived in the "Great House" in Henbury, Bristol. It is not clear how he came to the household; historians believe that he may have been born into the household as the son of an enslaved West African woman, and named by Howard. One biographer has suggested that Africanus' name implies that Howard intended to free him for loyal service because the Roman historian Polybius wrote about how the Roman general Africanus freed people he had enslaved who promised to work hard.

Africanus died in the Great House aged eighteen.

== Grave ==
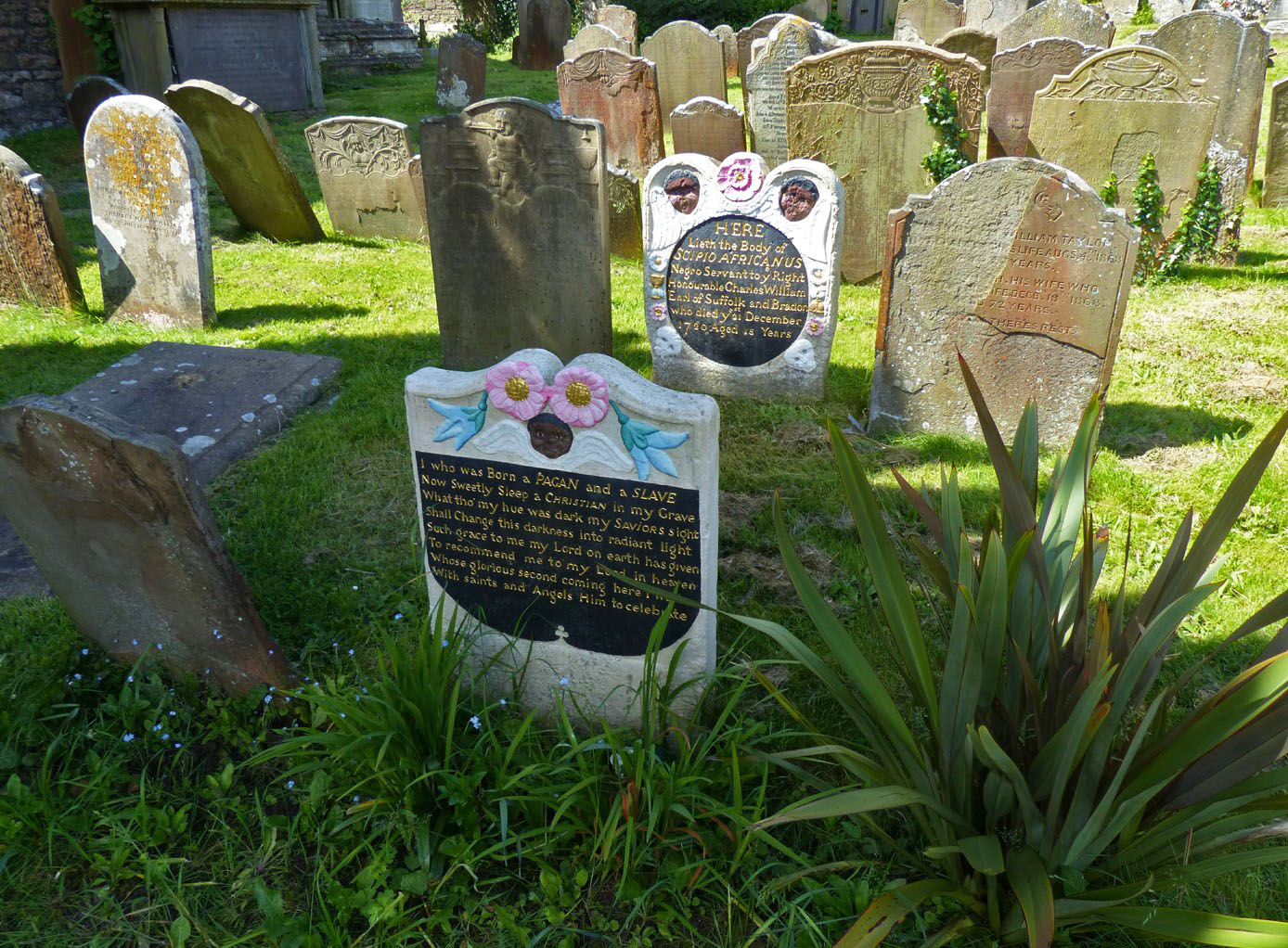
A general view of the grave of Scipio

He is remembered because of the elaborate grave, consisting of painted headstone and footstone, in the churchyard of St Mary's in Henbury. The grave is Grade II* listed. Both stones feature Black cherubs and the footstone bears the epitaph:

I who was Born a PAGAN and a SLAVE
Now Sweetly Sleep a CHRISTIAN in my Grave
What tho' my hue was dark my SAVIORS sight
Shall Change this darkness into radiant light
Such grace to me my Lord on earth has given
To recommend me to my Lord in heaven
Whose glorious second coming here I wait
With saints and Angels Him to celebrate

It is thought that 10,000 enslaved Black people and servants were in Britain in the early eighteenth century, but this is one of the very few memorials to them. Despite the quality of the memorial, there is no record of his burial in the church registers.

=== 2020 vandalism ===
Sometime on 16 or 17 June 2020 the headstone was smashed in two, with a message left nearby in chalk suggesting that the vandalism was in retaliation for the pulling down of the statue of Edward Colston by Black Lives Matter protestors, as well as the proposed removal of the gravestone of music hall blackface artist G. H. Elliott:

Now look at what you made me do. Stop protesting. Leave Elliott’s grave alone. Put Colston’s statue back or things will really heat up.

The memorial was restored and put back in place in 2021.

== Legacy ==
The Bristol-based reggae band Black Roots wrote a song about Scipio Africanus which they performed live at Trinity Hall, Bristol on Channel 4's 10-part series Rockers Roadshow, produced by Mike Wallington and hosted by Mikey Dread in the 1980s. They featured a short scene of the grave.

The author Eugene Byrne featured Scipio Africanus in his 2001 alternative history novel Things Unborn. In this novel people who had suffered an untimely death were reincarnated in an England recovering from a nuclear war; Scipio Africanus was a famous war hero and a detective inspector in the Metropolitan Police.

== See also ==
- List of slaves
