= Henbury Hundred =

Former administrative subdivision of Gloucestershire, England

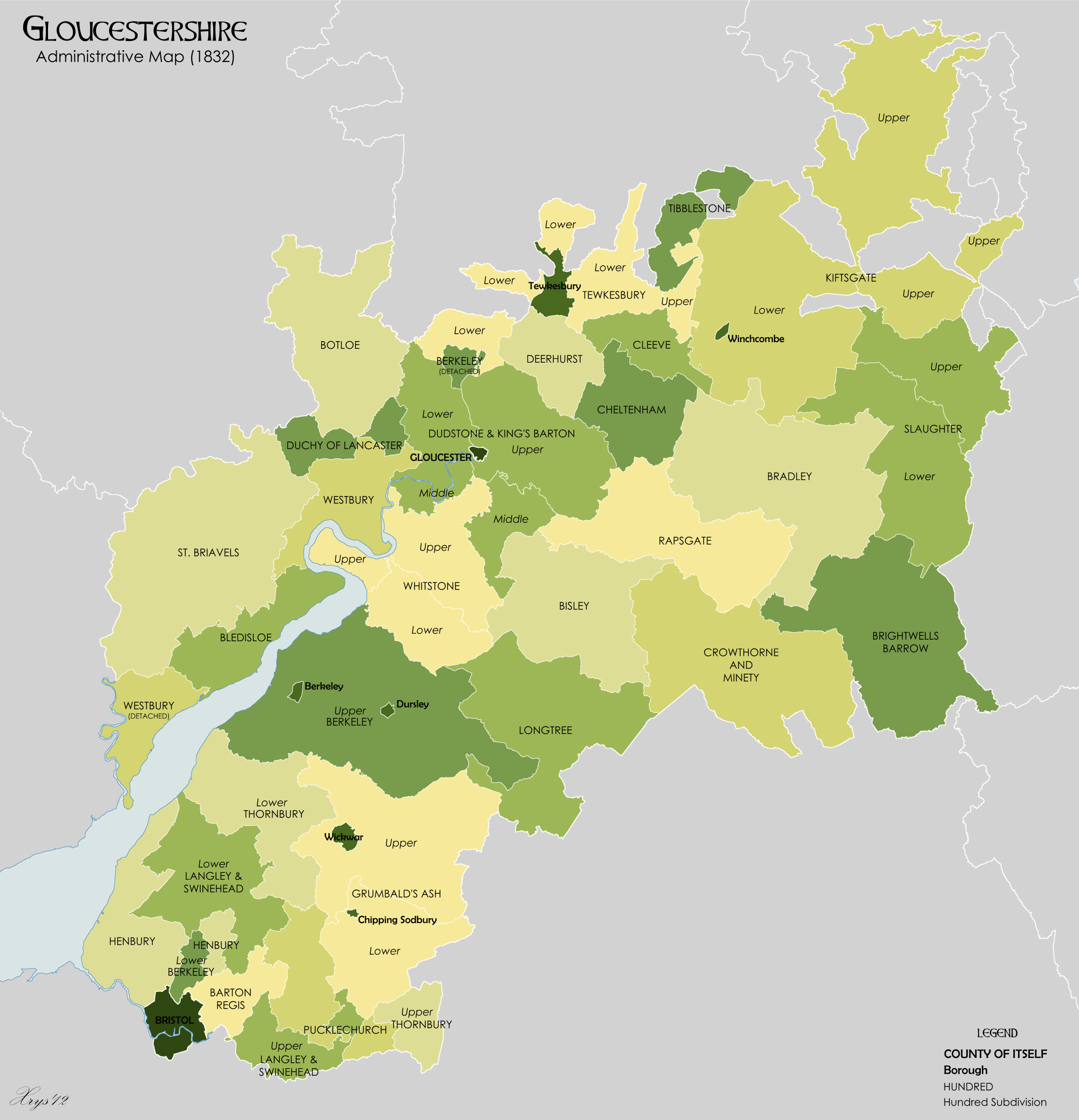
Gloucestershire Hundreds in 1832

Henbury Hundred was a subdivision of the county of Gloucestershire, England. Hundreds originated in the late Saxon period and lasted as administrative divisions until the 19th century.

It comprised the five ancient parishes of Henbury, Westbury-upon-Trym, Compton Greenfield, Stoke Gifford and Yate, except for the tithing of Kings Weston, in Henbury parish, which was included in the Hundred of Berkeley. In addition, the tithing of Itchington—part of Tytherington parish—was included in Henbury hundred, with the rest of the parish in Thornbury Hundred.

The hundred was occasionally divided into Lower and Upper Divisions, the former comprising Westbury on Trym and part of Henbury and the latter the remainder of Henbury and the other parishes. The hundred was named after the tithing and parish of Henbury, which came from hēah burh, a high fortified place.

At the time of the Domesday Book, the Hundred was known as Brentry (another settlement in Henbury parish) and had the same borders. It listed a total of 11 locations in the six parishes:

- Henbury - Henbury, Charlton, Aust and Redwick
- Greenfield Compton
- Tytherington - Itchington
- Westbury upon Trym - Westbury upon Trym, Redland, Stoke Bishop
- Yate
- Stoke Gifford
