= Henbury, Bristol =

Suburb of Bristol, England

Coordinates: 51.5050°N 2.6284°W

Henbury
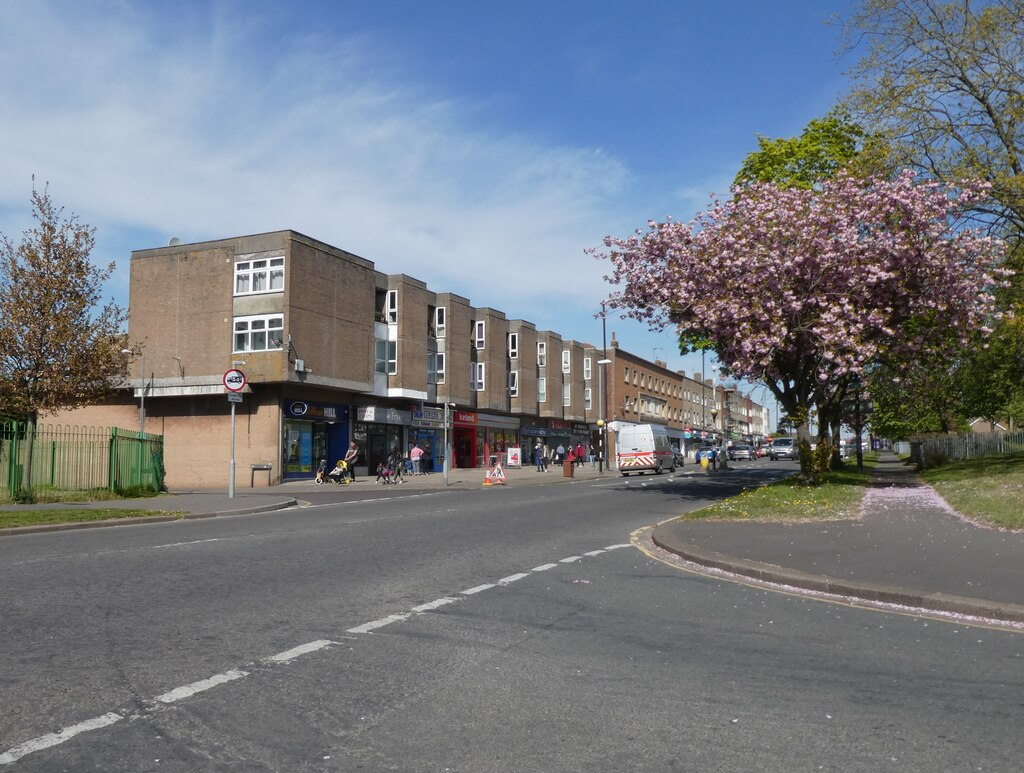
- Shopping parade on Crow Lane

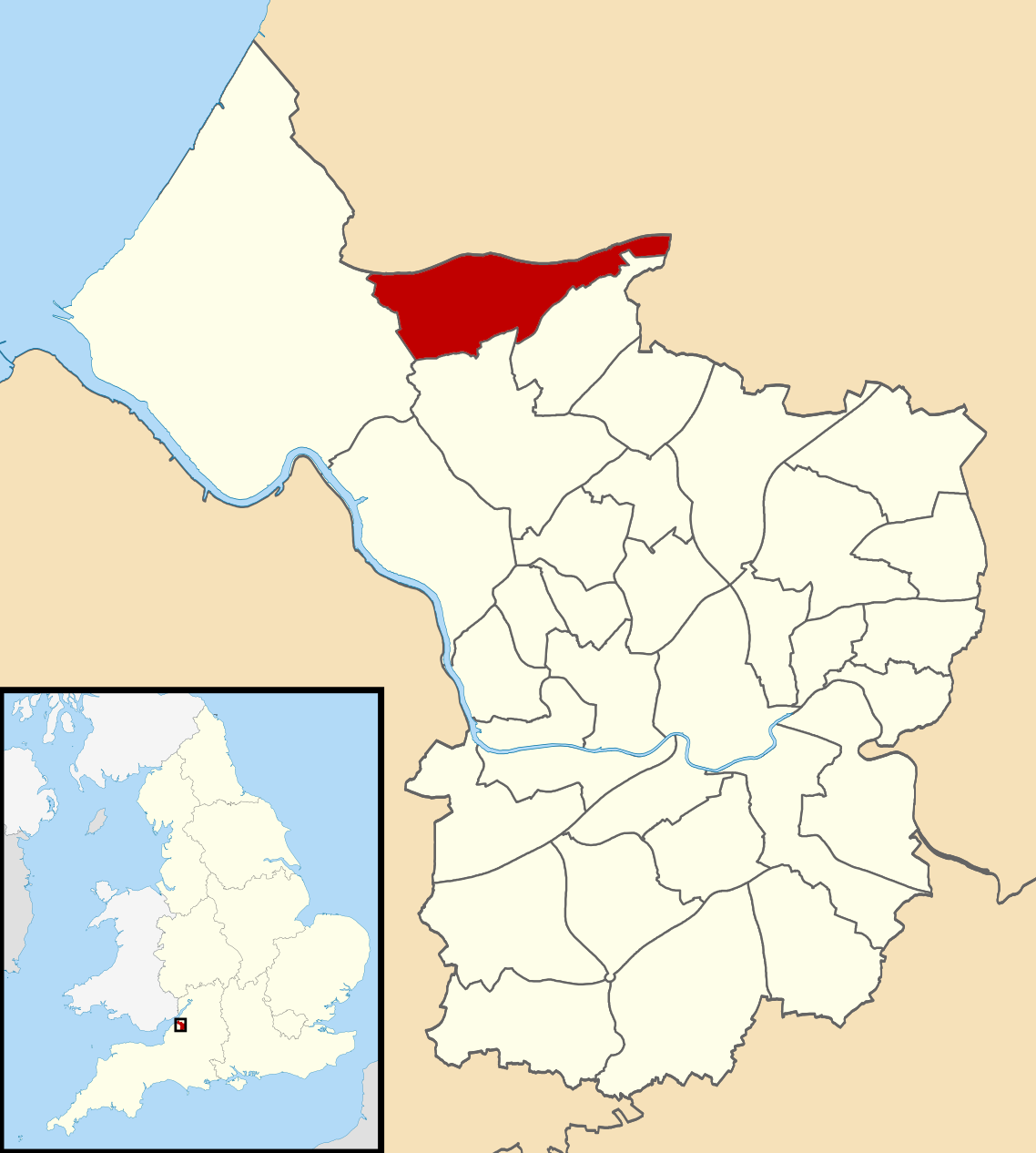
- Boundaries of Henbury and Brentry city council ward, shown within Bristol.
- Population: 10,699 (2011.Ward)
- OS grid reference: ST564786
- Unitary authority: Bristol
- Ceremonial county: Bristol
- Region: South West
- Country: England
- Sovereign state: United Kingdom
- Post town: BRISTOL
- Postcode district: BS10
- Dialling code: 0117
- Police: Avon and Somerset
- Fire: Avon
- Ambulance: South Western
- UK Parliament: Bristol North West

Henbury is a suburb of Bristol, England, approximately 5 miles (8.0 km) north west of the city centre. It was formerly a village in Gloucestershire and is now bordered by Westbury-on-Trym to the south; Brentry to the east and the Blaise Castle Estate, Blaise Hamlet and Lawrence Weston to the west. To the north lie the South Gloucestershire village of Hallen and the entertainment/retail park Cribbs Causeway.

The Hazel Brook (also known as the Hen), a tributary of the River Trym, flows through Henbury and crosses Henbury Road in a small ford near The Henbury Arms carvery restaurant. The ford is more than a foot deep relatively often and a small bridge exists as a main route for motor vehicles a few metres away.

Henbury is also the name of a council ward for Bristol City Council that includes both Henbury and Brentry.

Henbury Golf Club sits on the south border.

== History ==
Henbury was first mentioned in 692 as Heanburg. The name is from the Old English hēan byrig, meaning 'high fortified place'. It was mentioned in the Domesday Book of 1086 as Henberie.

By a charter purported to date from the 690s Æthelred, king of Mercia, granted land at Henbury to Oftfor, bishop of Worcester, but the authenticity of the charter has been disputed. An 8th century charter grants land at "Heanburu" to the church at Worcester, but the reference may be to Hanbury in Worcestershire. There is more secure evidence that by the 790s Henbury was held by the Bishop of Worcester.

Henbury was historically a very large parish and the centre of a hundred of the same name. The parish extended to the River Severn and included King's Weston, Lawrence Weston, Hallen, Charlton, Pilning, Northwick and Aust. When the civil parish was created in 1866, parts of the ancient parish were separated to form the civil parishes of Redwick and Northwick (later Pilning and Severn Beach) and Aust. The parish of Compton Greenfield, including the village of Easter Compton, was added to the civil parish of Henbury in 1885.

In 1901, part of the civil parish was absorbed into Bristol, and further parts were absorbed into Bristol between then and 1933. In 1935, the civil parish was abolished, when the remaining parts were absorbed into the civil parishes of Pilning and Severn Beach, and Almondsbury. In 1931 the parish had a population of 2823.

Botany Bay is an old name for the area of Henbury centred on the modern Marmion Crescent believed to derive from the nineteenth-century name of a row of cottages. The Great House, Henbury was the home of the Astry family, and of the slave or manservant Scipio Africanus (see below). Nearby Henbury Court was built by Thomas Stock to replace the Great House. Henbury Court was demolished in the 1950s.

A large council housing estate was built in the area during the 1950s and 1960s to clear slums in central areas of Bristol such as Easton and St Paul's, that at the time, was extremely overpopulated and were considered as slums. A landmark of the skyline in Henbury is the two high-rise tower blocks that overlook the estate.

== Churches ==
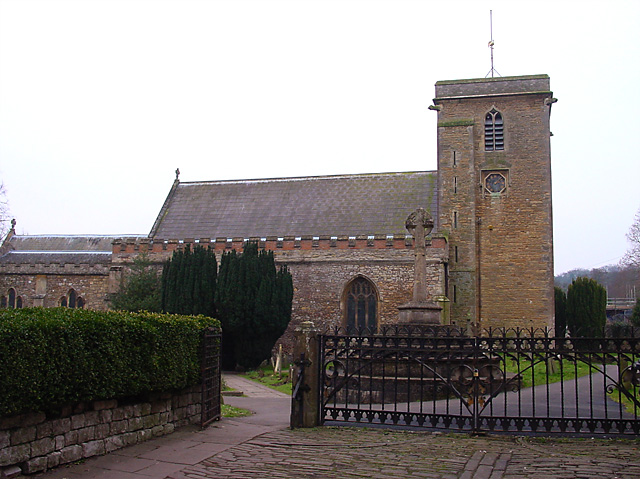
Church of St Mary the Virgin, Henbury

The parish Church of St Mary the Virgin dates from approximately 1096. The tower is from the early 13th century. The north chapel was built, and further restoration work undertaken by Thomas Rickman in 1836, with further restoration by G. E. Street in 1875–7. It is a grade II* listed building. The churchyard contains the grave of Scipio Africanus, the west African 18th-century manservant of Charles William Howard, 7th Earl of Suffolk, notable for its brightly painted gravestones.

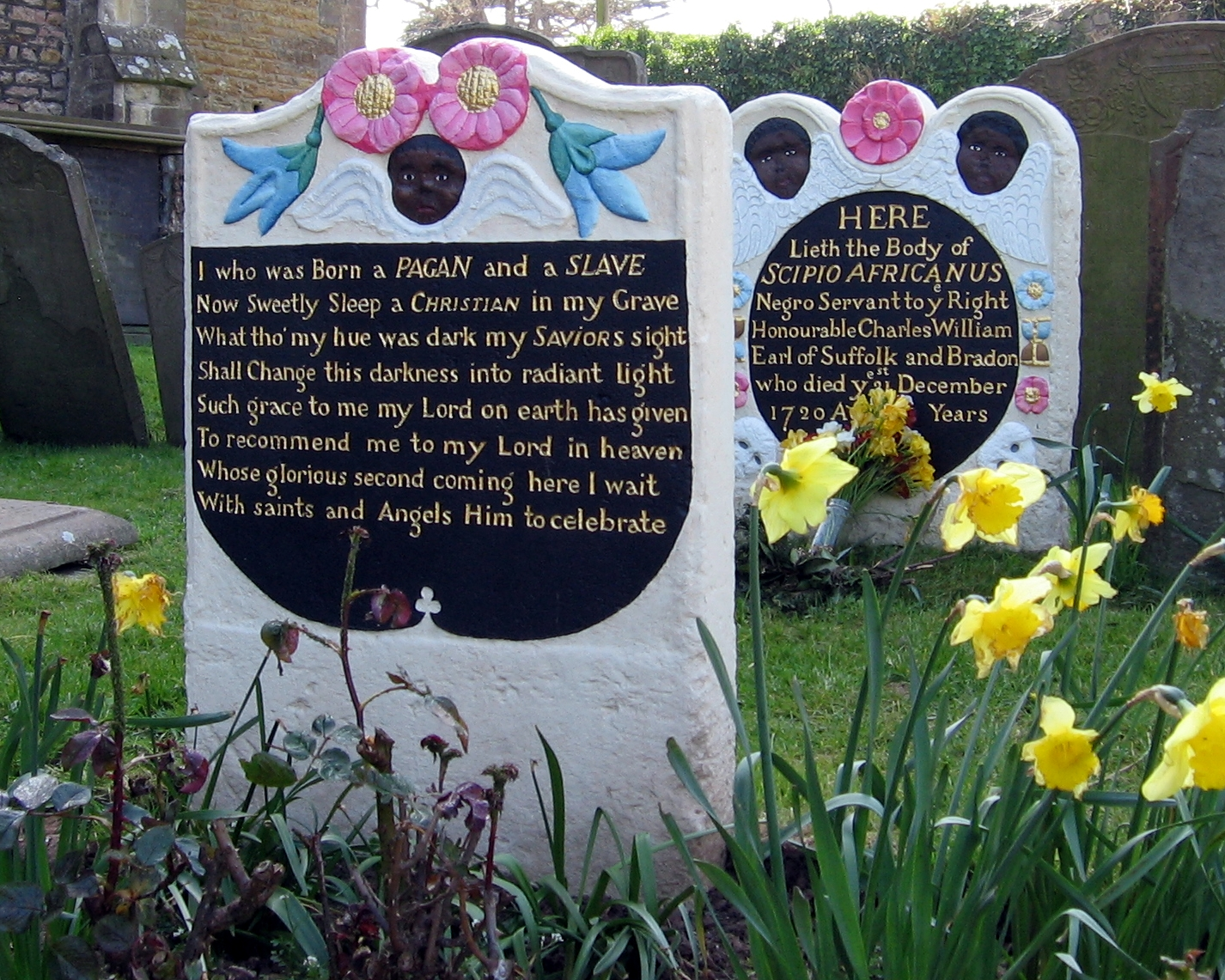
Grave of Scipio Africanus

Emmanuel Chapel Henbury is an independent evangelical church located on Satchfield Crescent.

St Antony's Church is a Catholic church which was built in the 1950s and is also located on Satchfield Crescent.

== Schools ==
List of schools in Henbury, Bristol:

- Henbury Court Primary School
- Blaise Primary School
- Blaise High School
- Woodstock Special School

== Other buildings ==
Henbury Village Hall is a Grade II listed building.

Henbury Leisure Centre is home to a 25-metre swimming pool, fitness suite, full-size all-weather pitch and a variety of fitness programmes and classes. It is located on the site of Henbury Secondary School.

The Henbury Lodge Hotel is operated by Best Western. The building itself is believed to have been built around 1600 as two cottages, before being combined into one dwelling in 1712.

== Location and transportation links ==
Henbury is served by buses of First West of England, routes 1, 2, 4 and 76.

Henbury provides good access to major trunk roads such as the A4018, M4 and M5 motorways. It is located approximately two miles away from M5 junction 17 and five miles from the M4/M5 interchange. Bristol city centre is approximately five miles south east of Henbury.

Henbury station on the Henbury Loop railway between St Andrews Road and Filton Junction was opened in 1910 and closed in 1964. The station is scheduled to reopen in 2021 as part of MetroWest's Phase Two, with trains calling at Bristol Temple Meads railway station.
