= Kate Bradbury Griffith =

British egyptologist (1854–1902)

Kate Bradbury Griffith (née Bradbury; 26 August 1854 – 2 March 1902) was a British Egyptologist who assisted in the early development of the Egypt Exploration Society and the Department of Egyptology at University College London (UCL). Bradbury was born in Ashton-under-Lyne, near Manchester, UK, to Elizabeth Ann Tomlins and businessman Charles Timothy Bradbury.

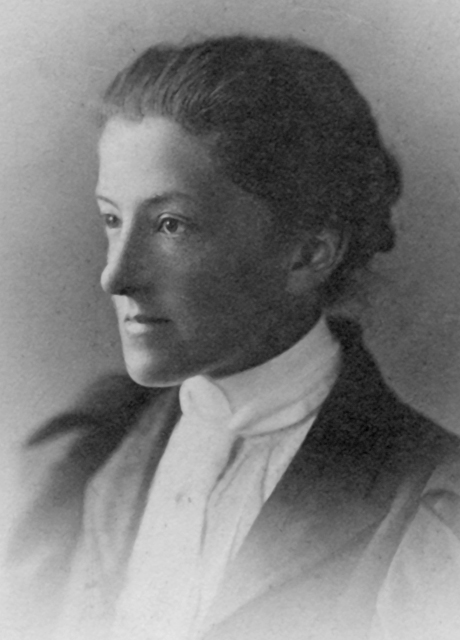
Photograph of Bradbury, c. 1890

== Career in Egyptology ==
Bradbury was among the early supporters of the Egypt Exploration Fund (EEF), founded in 1882 to support British excavations in Egypt. Her friend, the journalist and traveller Amelia Edwards, was a founding member of the EEF. Kate Bradbury met Amelia Edwards in late 1887 or early 1888, and Bradbury was 20 years younger than Edwards. By May 1888, Bradbury was staying regularly with Edwards and her companion Ellen Braysher at their home, The Larches. As Ellen became ill, Bradbury took on more of the role of Edwards' companion and confidant. From 1888 to 1892, Bradbury lived with Edwards almost full time. Edwards trained her in the daily administration of the Egypt Exploration Fund, and to be her own personal secretary.

She was a Committee member and one of the Fund's local secretaries, helping to gather subscriptions in Britain on the Fund's behalf.

When Edwards died in 1892, Bradbury became her executrix. In her will Edwards gave her collection of Egyptian antiquities to University College London. She had also provided the funding for the Edwards Professor of Egyptian Archaeology and Philology to be established. The archaeologist William Matthew Flinders Petrie was the first postholder. A former student of Petrie's, Francis Llewellyn Griffith came to UCL to teach ancient Egyptian language.

Kate Bradbury continued to contribute to Egyptology. She provided additional display cases to house the Edwards Collection at UCL, and coordinated unpacking the antiquities and placing them in the cases. She collaborated with Griffith in translations of ancient Egyptian texts, which were published in the multi-volume work A Library of the World's Great Literature (Vol 9, 1896). She also translated Dr Alfred Wiedemann's Egyptian Doctrine of Immortality (1895) and Religion of the Ancient Egyptians (1897) into English from German.

Bradbury Griffith helped Norman de Garis Davies to become a copyist on Petrie's excavation at Dendera for the 1897/1898 season.

== Trip to the United States ==
In 1890 Bradbury accompanied Edwards on a lecture tour of America, where Edwards was promoting and fundraising for the EEF. The American tour began on with Edwards' first lecture on November 7, 1889 at the Brooklyn Institute (which would become the Brooklyn Museum). It ended on March 28, 1890 at the Brooklyn Institute with Edwards' final lecture. The two women sailed back the following day on the Etruria.

== Personal life ==
Bradbury married Francis Griffith in 1896, with Petrie's blessing and a little convincing. They collaborated on a lot of work together for the next 6 years. The Griffiths lived together in the home of Kate's father, near Manchester. Griffith was appointed to the post of Honorary Professor of Egyptology at Manchester University. However, Bradbury Griffith continued her relationship with UCL, providing funding for the Edwards Library, which held a growing collection of Egyptology books. She died in March, 1902.
