= Compton Greenfield =

Hamlet in Gloucestershire, England

Coordinates: 51°32′02″N 2°37′20″W

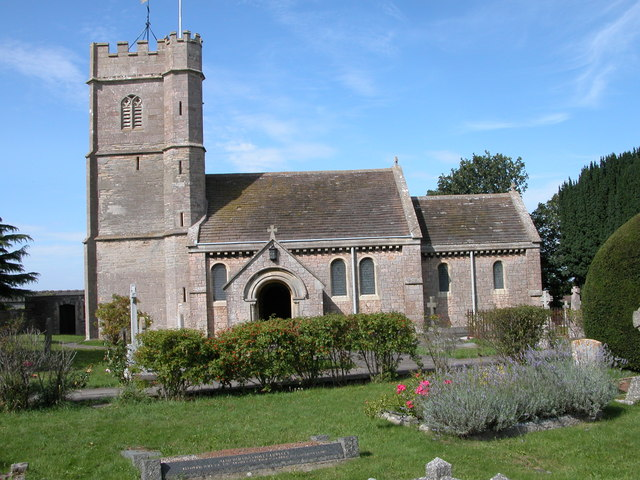
- All Saints Church, Compton Greenfield

- Location within Gloucestershire
- OS grid reference: ST573823
- Civil parish: Almondsbury
- Unitary authority: South Gloucestershire
- Ceremonial county: Gloucestershire
- Region: South West
- Country: England
- Sovereign state: United Kingdom
- Post town: BRISTOL
- Postcode district: BS35
- Dialling code: 01454
- Police: Avon and Somerset
- Fire: Avon
- Ambulance: South Western
- UK Parliament: Thornbury and Yate

Compton Greenfield is a small hamlet of farms and spread-out houses to the southwest of Easter Compton, in South Gloucestershire. The parish church of All Saints is a Grade II* listed building. It has a Norman arch in its porch, but the church was largely rebuilt in 1852 in the Neo-Norman style. The churchyard of All Saints is the final resting place of Sir George White, founder of the Bristol Aeroplane Company, and Sir John Francis Davis, second Governor of Hong Kong.

== History ==
Compton Greenfield was mentioned in the Domesday Book (as Contone). In the 13th and 14th centuries the Lords of the Manor were the Grenville family, from whom the village derived its suffix. Until the 19th century the parish extended to the River Severn, and included what is now the much larger village of Easter Compton. The parish became a civil parish in 1866, but in 1885 the civil parish was merged into the civil parish of Henbury. When the civil parish of Henbury was abolished in 1935, the village became part of the civil parish of Almondsbury.
