= Footstone =

Marker at the foot of a grave

Row of graves with headstones (left) and footstones (right) in Snailwell, England

A footstone is a marker at the foot of a grave. The footstone lies opposite the headstone, which is usually the primary grave marker. As indicated, these markers are usually stone, though modern footstones are often made of concrete, or some metal (usually bronze) in the form of a cast plate, which may or may not be set in concrete. The footstone may simply mark the foot of a grave, serving as a boundary marker for the grave plot, but more often provide additional information about the interred decedent. A footstone usually contains the initials of the person whose grave it marks.

== United States ==
In the United States, when a member or veteran of the U.S. Armed Forces dies, the federal government will provide and install a headstone inscribed with the veteran's name and relevant military information, at no cost to the family. In many cases, the veteran and/or the veteran's family decide to purchase a larger and more personalized gravestone at their own expense. The family then has the option of requesting a flat marker, which can be used as a footstone, from the federal government for the grave of the veteran. The preferred marker in these cases is a bronze plaque with the veteran's name and military information, and is often bolted to a granite base and set at the foot of a grave. This optional footstone is preferred by families who want a personal headstone over the grave, but still want the grave marked with official recognition of the veteran's service.

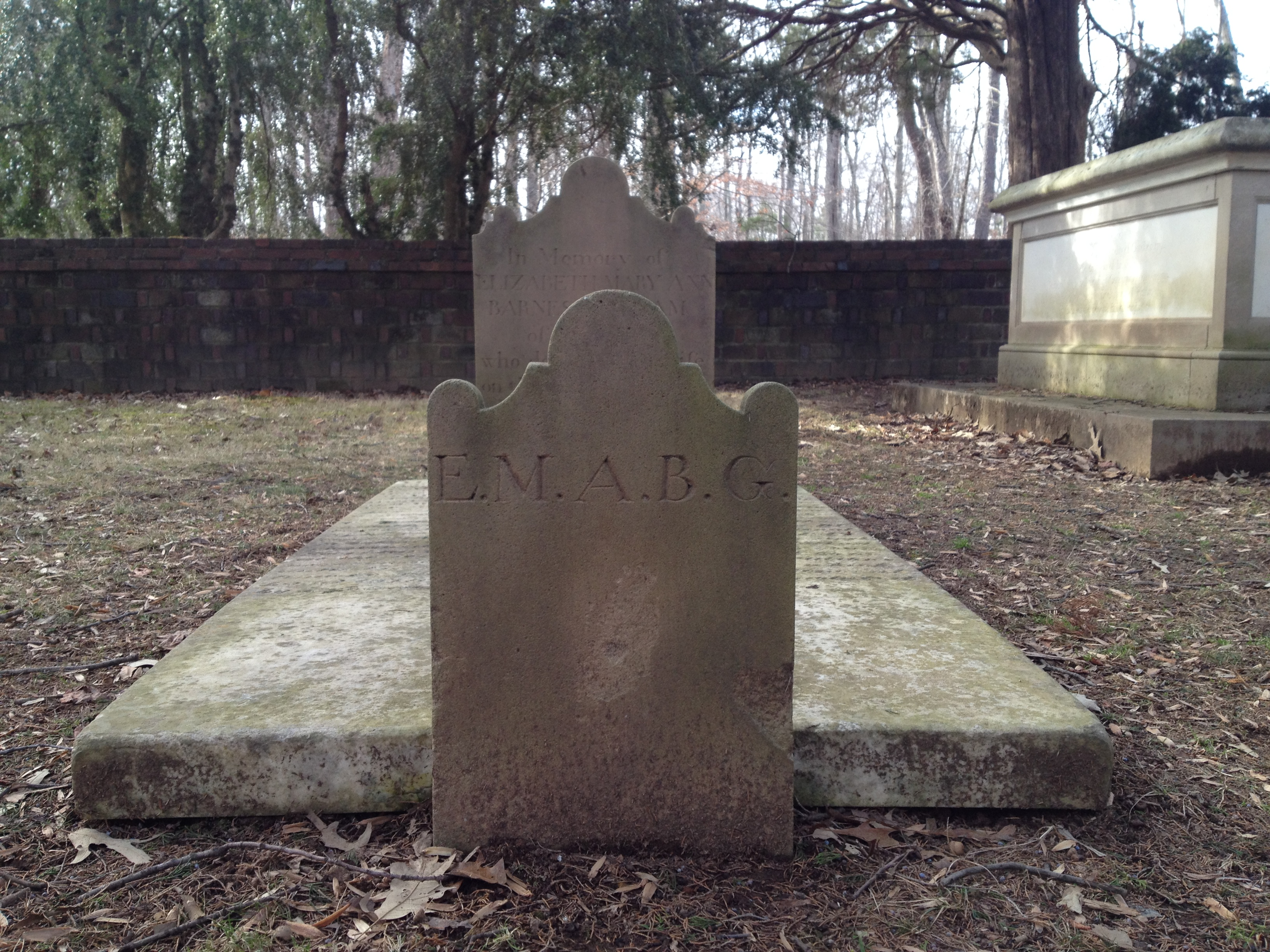
Headstone and footstone
