= Sea Mills railway station =

Railway station in Bristol, England

Sea Mills
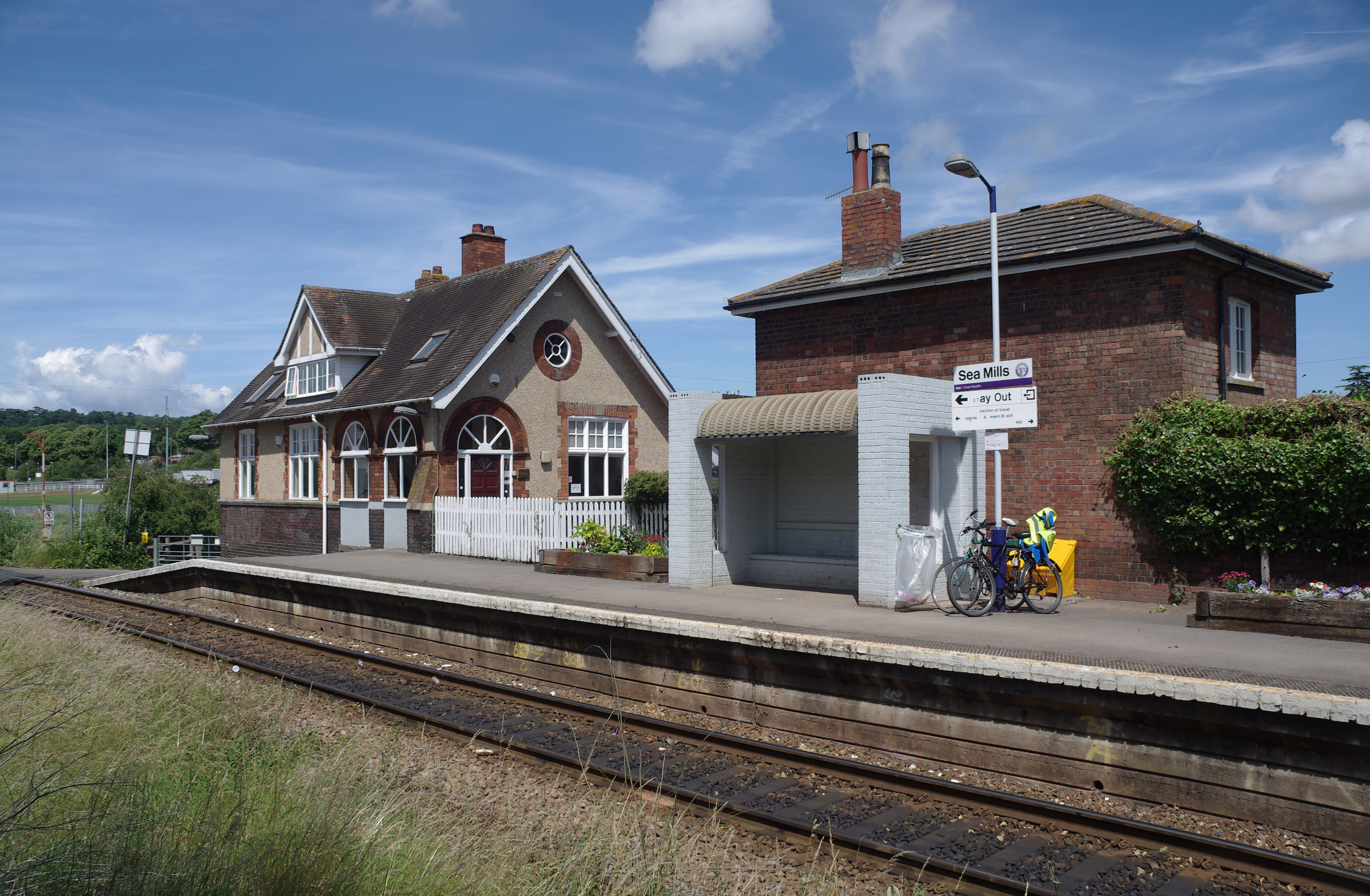

General information
- Location: Sea Mills, Bristol; England
- Coordinates: 51.4799°N 2.6498°W
- Grid reference: ST549758
- Manager: Great Western Railway
- Platforms: 1

Other information
- Station code: SML
- Classification: DfT category F2

Key dates
- 6 March 1865: Station opened
- 1906–07: Station rebuilt and second platform opened
- 19 October 1970: Reduced to single track

Passengers
- 2021/22: ▲36,408
- 2022/23: ▲62,422
- 2023/24: ▲78,810
- 2024/25: ▲81,946
- 2025/26: ▲94,320
Location
Notes
- Passenger statistics from the Office of Rail and Road

Sea Mills railway station is on the Severn Beach line and serves the districts of Sea Mills, Stoke Bishop, Sneyd Park and nearby Westbury on Trym in Bristol, England. It is 6 miles (9.7 km) from Bristol Temple Meads, situated at the confluence of the River Avon and River Trym and near the A4 Bristol Portway. Its three letter station code is SML. The station has a single platform which serves trains in both directions. As of 2015 it is managed by Great Western Railway, which is the third franchise to be responsible for the station since privatisation in 1997. They provide all train services at the station.

The station was opened in 1865 as part of a project by the Bristol Port Railway and Pier Company to construct a deep water pier at Avonmouth and connect that to Bristol city docks via a railway terminating at Hotwells. Originally built to serve the mansions and villas of the wealthy districts of Stoke Bishop and Sneyd Park, the station had a single platform. After a tunnel was driven under The Downs, passenger services connected it to the wider rail network in the 1880s via the Clifton Extension Railway. A second platform was added and a new ticket office and waiting rooms were built in 1906. Passenger numbers greatly increased, particularly after Sea Mills Garden Suburb was built by Bristol Corporation on the opposite bank of the River Trym in the 1920s, and the remaining farmland in Stoke Bishop and Sneyd Park was infilled with private suburban housing throughout the inter-war period. At one point the station was staffed by a stationmaster and four porters. However, the line declined over the latter half of the twentieth century. By the 1970s the station had no staff and was again reduced to one platform, and in the 1980s the station buildings were sold off. Services have, however, increased since 2000 and there are now trains every 30 minutes in each direction six days a week and once an hour on Sundays.

== Description ==
The station is located on the southern edge of the district of Sea Mills. The surrounding area is mostly residential, with allotments to the west and a small football ground (Bristol Manor Farm FC) to the north. The station is less than 100 metres (110 yd) from the River Avon to the west, and directly south of a small harbour at the mouth of the River Trym, which the railway crosses on a bridge. The station has road access to the east from Sea Mills Lane, which runs parallel to the Trym, and can also be accessed via a footpath along the Avon to the west. The A4 Bristol Portway is less than 200 metres (220 yd) east of the station, and crosses the railway south of the station. The station is on the Severn Beach line from Bristol Temple Meads to Severn Beach, 6 miles 0 chains (9.7 km) from Temple Meads and 7 miles 43 chains (12.1 km) from Severn Beach. (Note: Railways in the United Kingdom are, for historical reasons, measured in miles and chains. There are 80 chains to the mile.) It is the sixth station from Temple Meads. The next station towards Temple Meads is Clifton Down; the next towards Severn Beach is Shirehampton.

The station is on an alignment of approximately 160 degrees, curving towards the south. There is a single 118-yard (108 m)-long platform which serves trains in both directions, situated on the east side of the track. The station's western platform was abandoned in 1970 and is overgrown. A user-worked level crossing at the north end of the station allows vehicles and pedestrians to cross the railway, alternatively pedestrians may cross the line using a footpath which goes under the bridge over the River Trym.

Facilities at the station are minimal – there is a brick shelter and a few seats. Timetable information is provided; help points show next train information and allow users to contact railway staff. There is no ticket office or other means for buying or collecting tickets, nor is there any car park or cycle storage facility. The nearest bus stops are 300 metres (330 yd) away on the A4 Portway. In 2021 a mural was created at the station by Graft in consultation with local people.

The line through Sea Mills has a speed limit of 30 miles per hour (48 km/h) for locomotive-hauled trains and 50 miles per hour (80 km/h) for diesel multiple units. The line handles less than 5 million train tonnes per year, has a loading gauge of W6 and a route availability of 7. In the 2012/13 financial year, approximately 58,000 passengers used Sea Mills station, making it the 1,863rd busiest station in the country and the tenth busiest within the Bristol unitary authority area. This was an increase of almost 70% from the 2002–03 financial year, and reflected a general rise in usage of the Severn Beach Line. (Note: Annual estimated passenger usage based on sales of tickets in stated financial year(s) which end or originate at Sea Mills, from Office of Rail and Road statistics. Methodology may vary year on year.)

== Services ==
All services at Sea Mills are operated by Great Western Railway using Class 166 Turbo DMUs.

The typical off-peak service in trains per hour is:

- 2 tph to Bristol Temple Meads of which 1 continues to Weston-super-Mare
- 2 tph to Avonmouth of which 1 continues to Severn Beach

On Sundays, there is an hourly service between Bristol Temple Meads and Severn Beach with one train per day to and from Weston-super-Mare.

Services previously ran every 40 minutes in each direction but were increased to half-hourly in the December 2021 timetable change.

Preceding station	National Rail	Following station
Shirehampton	Great Western Railway Severn Beach line	Clifton Down

== History ==
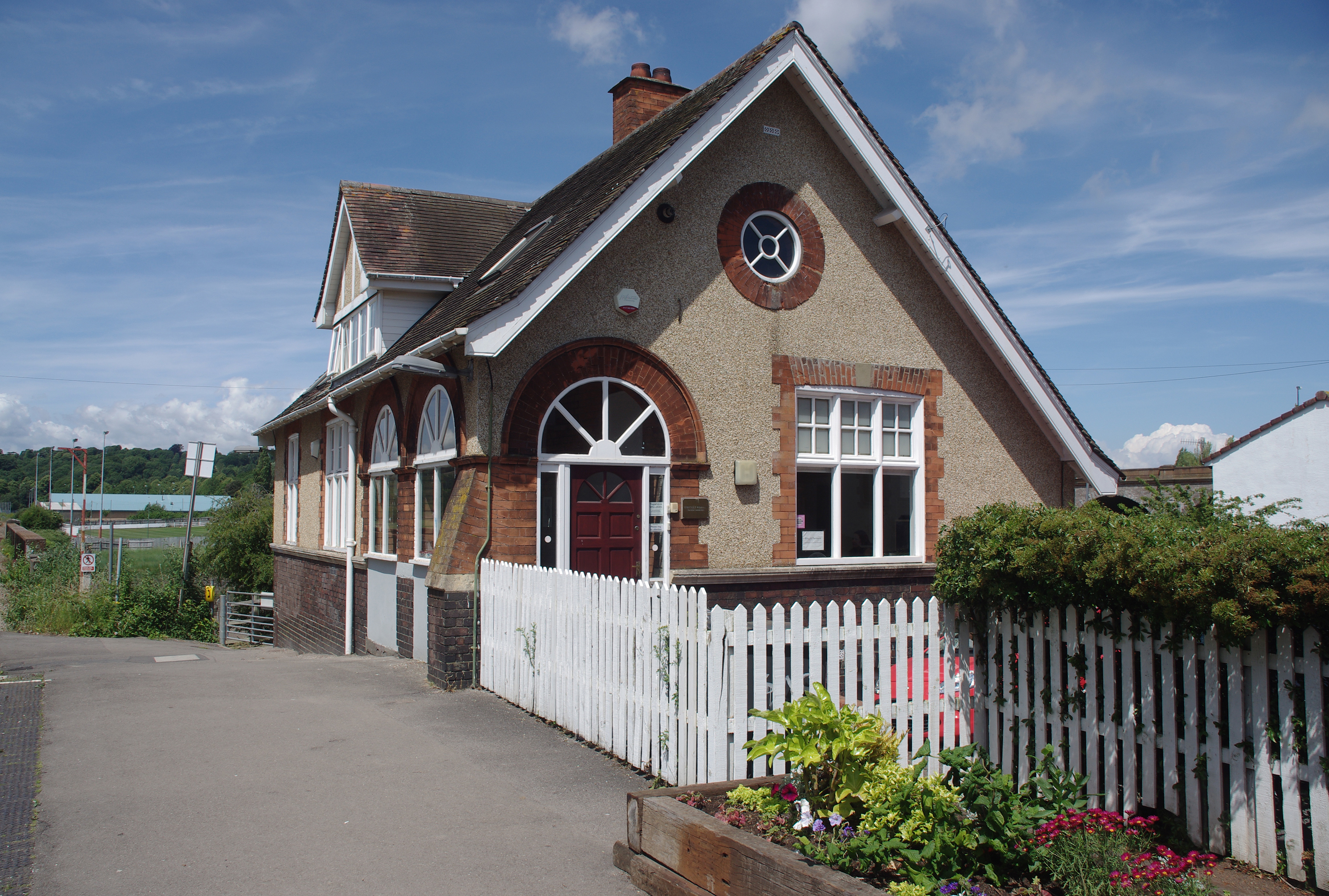
The station building was constructed in 1906, but is now a private property unconnected to the railway.

The station was opened on 6 March 1865 when services began on the Bristol Port Railway and Pier (BPRP), a self-contained railway which ran along the north bank of the River Avon to a deep water pier on the Severn Estuary at Avonmouth. The route was 4 ft 8 1/2 in (1,435 mm) standard gauge single track, with Sea Mills initially the first station along the line, 2 miles 01 chain (3.2 km) from the southern terminus at Hotwells. A single 150 feet (46 m)-long uncovered platform was provided on the north side of the line, with a wooden building containing the booking office and porter's office. The station staff consisted of a stationmaster with a porter being brought in from Hotwells when needed. A south-facing goods siding was provided, but the station mostly dealt with passengers and parcels. The initial service was six trains per day in each direction.

The BPRP ran into trouble by 1871 when the terminal pier at Avonmouth became difficult to use due to a build-up of silt. With no prospect of a proper dock being funded without a connection to the national rail network, the Clifton Extension Railway (CER) was approved. This was a joint venture by the BPRP, Great Western Railway and Midland Railway which ran from Sneyd Park Junction, 21 chains (420 m) south of Sea Mills, via Clifton Down, to join up with the national network at Narroways Hill Junction. The link opened in 1877, but only for goods trains: Colonel William Yolland, the chief inspector of British railways, considered the platforms at Sea Mills to be too short for passenger interchange, as they were 250 feet (76 m) shorter than at any station on the CER. Rather than build a new interchange station at Sneyd Park Junction, the platforms at Sea Mills were extended to 300 feet (91 m) at the expense of the BPRP. The goods siding was also removed at this time, as Yolland had expressed concern that the points were not interlocked. The route from Sneyd Park Junction to Clifton Down was subsequently cleared for passenger use on 3 August 1878, but the Midland and Great Western Railways did not think the BPRP track was in a suitable condition and so refused to run any passenger trains beyond Clifton Down. Services along the BPRP however increased to eight trains per day in each direction from 1877, and then to ten each way by 1887. From 1 September 1885, when passenger services along the link finally started, the Great Western offered six trains per day each direction between Avonmouth and Bristol Temple Meads. Fearing competition, the BPRP did not allow passengers to use GWR services between its stations. The Midland Railway did not run any passenger services beyond Clifton Down, apart from a one-month trial service in September 1885. Despite the increased traffic, the BPRP suffered financially, and was taken over by the CER in 1890.

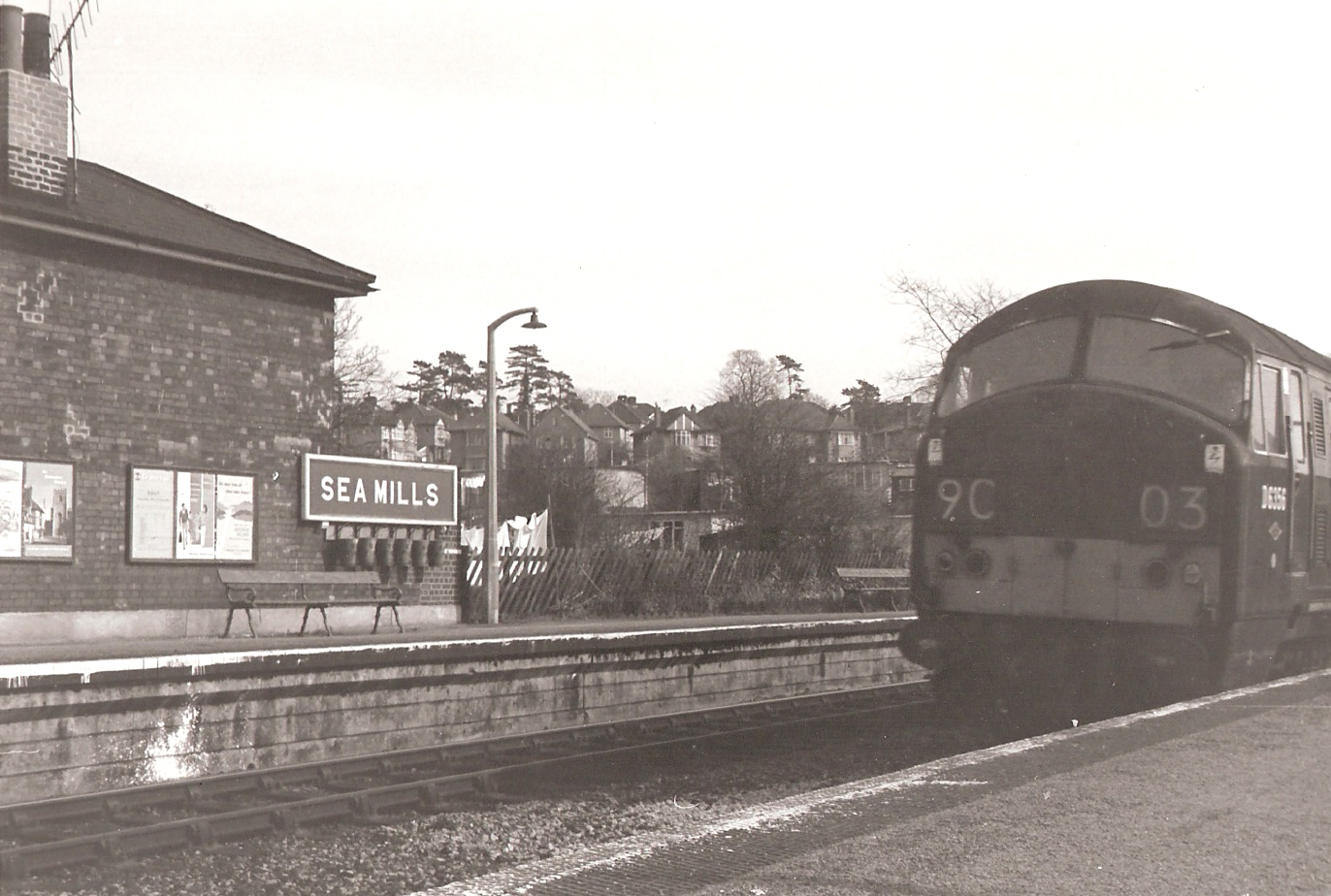
A train towards Avonmouth passes through Sea Mills circa 1963. The platform this train is using would be taken out of use in 1970.

Following the takeover, a new stationmaster's house was built at Sea Mills, at a cost of £240. The stationmaster is recorded as having kept a variety of farm animals and sold eggs to passengers. Increased levels of traffic saw the line through Sea Mills doubled in the early 1900s, and the opportunity was taken to rebuild the station. A second platform opened on 6 January 1907 to the west of the tracks to serve northbound trains. The original platform now exclusively served southbound trains, and was lengthened to 330 feet (100 m), the same length as the new platform. A station building was constructed on the original platform in a domestic style, with an arched terracotta entrance, spar-covered walls and a high-pitched tiled roof. The building contained a booking hall, booking office, toilets and a ladies' waiting room. A smaller building on the northbound platform contained a general waiting room. The subway under the bridge over the River Trym was also built at this time, with the porter's job being expanded to include washing the rubbish out of the subway after high tide, for which the railway provided a hosepipe and Wellington boots. By 1910 there were 17 trains from Bristol to Avonmouth and 15 back, increasing to 21 and 19 respectively by 1920, though not all stopped at Sea Mills. The station was completely closed on Sundays.

After the First World War, construction of the Bristol Portway along the Avon Gorge necessitated the closure of the line from Sneyd Park Junction to Hotwells, with trains along it ceasing on 3 July 1922. By this point there were nine trains per day from Hotwells, and eight return. To compensate for the loss of service, the Great Western provided an additional four trains daily towards Bristol and six toward Avonmouth. In 1923, grouping resulted in the Midland Railway being absorbed into the London, Midland and Scottish Railway (LMS), and the line continued in a joint arrangement between the Great Western and the LMS. From 1928 many trains to Avonmouth were extended to Severn Beach. By 1947, just before the railways were nationalised, there were 33 services each direction between Avonmouth and Temple Meads, with 18 on Sundays. Some trains made circular trips to and from Temple Meads via Clifton Down and Henbury or Pilning.

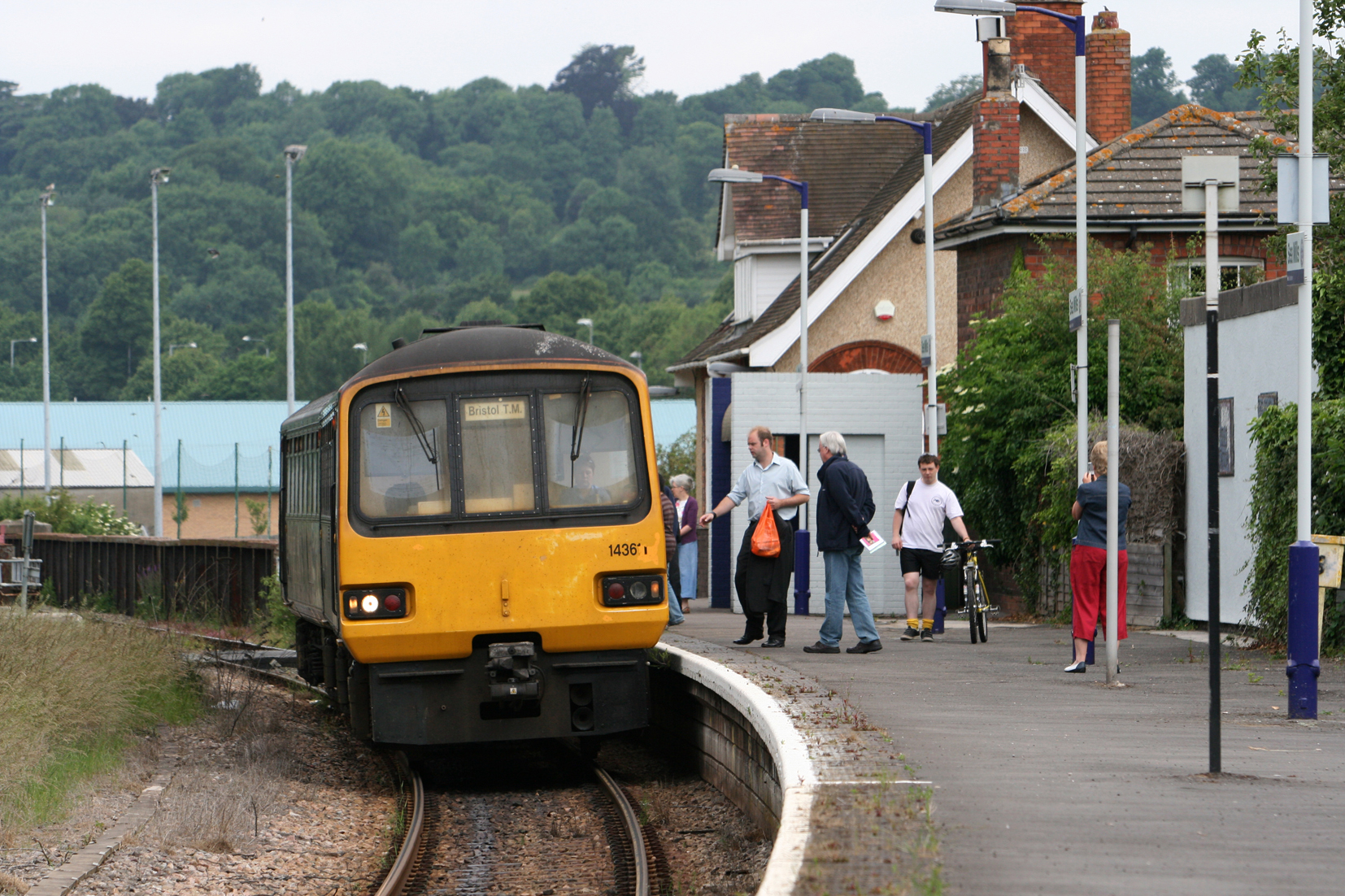
A First Great Western Class 143 Pacer DMU calls at Sea Mills with a train for Bristol Temple Meads in 2008.

When the railways were nationalised in 1948, services at Sea Mills came under the aegis of the Western Region of British Railways. Staffing by this point had increased to two porters and two lad porters, managed by the stationmaster at Shirehampton. By 1961 this was reduced to two porters, then to one in 1965. Service levels had decreased slightly by 1955 to 28 towards Avonmouth and 29 towards Bristol, but the services were at regular intervals. Passenger numbers however dropped sharply in 1961 as the result of a fare increase, and so in 1962 a new reduced timetable was enacted, which lost more passengers. A year later in 1963, the Beeching report suggested the complete withdrawal of services along the line, but ultimately only those beyond Severn Beach or via Henbury were withdrawn. From 17 July 1967 all staffing was withdrawn from stations along the line, including Sea Mills, with tickets issued by the train guard. The general reduction in passenger traffic, as well as the transfer of Avonmouth goods traffic to the Henbury Loop Line, allowed the removal of the second track from 19 October 1970, with all services using the original, eastern platform. The station building was sold, and in 2005 was being used by an engineering firm. By 1974, service had reduced to 19 trains per day in each direction.

British Rail was split into business-led sectors in the 1980s, at which time operations at Sea Mills passed to Regional Railways. At this time, all trains ran to Severn Beach, but the service pattern was irregular. This changed in 1995 when an hourly timetable was introduced for peak times, but northbound services were terminated at Avonmouth. There was no Sunday service.

When the railway was privatised in 1997, local services were franchised to Wales & West, which was succeeded by Wessex Trains, an arm of National Express, in 2001. Following action by Friends of Severn Beach Railway (FOSBR) and a string of protests, services had increased to 10 per day in each direction by 2005, with Bristol City Council providing a subsidy to Wessex Trains. The Wessex franchise was amalgamated with the Great Western franchise into the Greater Western franchise from 2006, and responsibility passed to First Great Western, a subsidiary company of FirstGroup, rebranded as Great Western Railway in 2015. A minimum service requirement was written into the franchise agreement, ensuring an hourly service along the line, and this has since been increased to three trains every two hours (24 trains per day). Sunday services to Severn Beach were restored in 2010. In December 2021 the service to Avonmouth was improved to half-hourly Monday to Saturday, and hourly on Sunday.

Preceding station	Historical railways	Following station
Shirehampton	Bristol Port Railway and Pier (1865–1890)	Hotwells; Line and station closed.
Shirehampton	Great Western Railway; Clifton Extension Railway (1890–1917)	Hotwells; Line and station closed.
Shirehampton	Great Western Railway; Clifton Extension Railway (1917–1922)	Hotwells Halt; Line and station closed.
Shirehampton	Great Western Railway; Clifton Extension Railway (1885–1948)	Clifton Down
Shirehampton	Western Region of British Railways; Severn Beach line (1948–1982)	Clifton Down
Shirehampton	Regional Railways; Severn Beach line (1982–1997)	Clifton Down
Shirehampton	Wales & West; Severn Beach line (1997–2001)	Clifton Down
Shirehampton	Wessex Trains; Severn Beach line (2001–2006)	Clifton Down

== Future ==
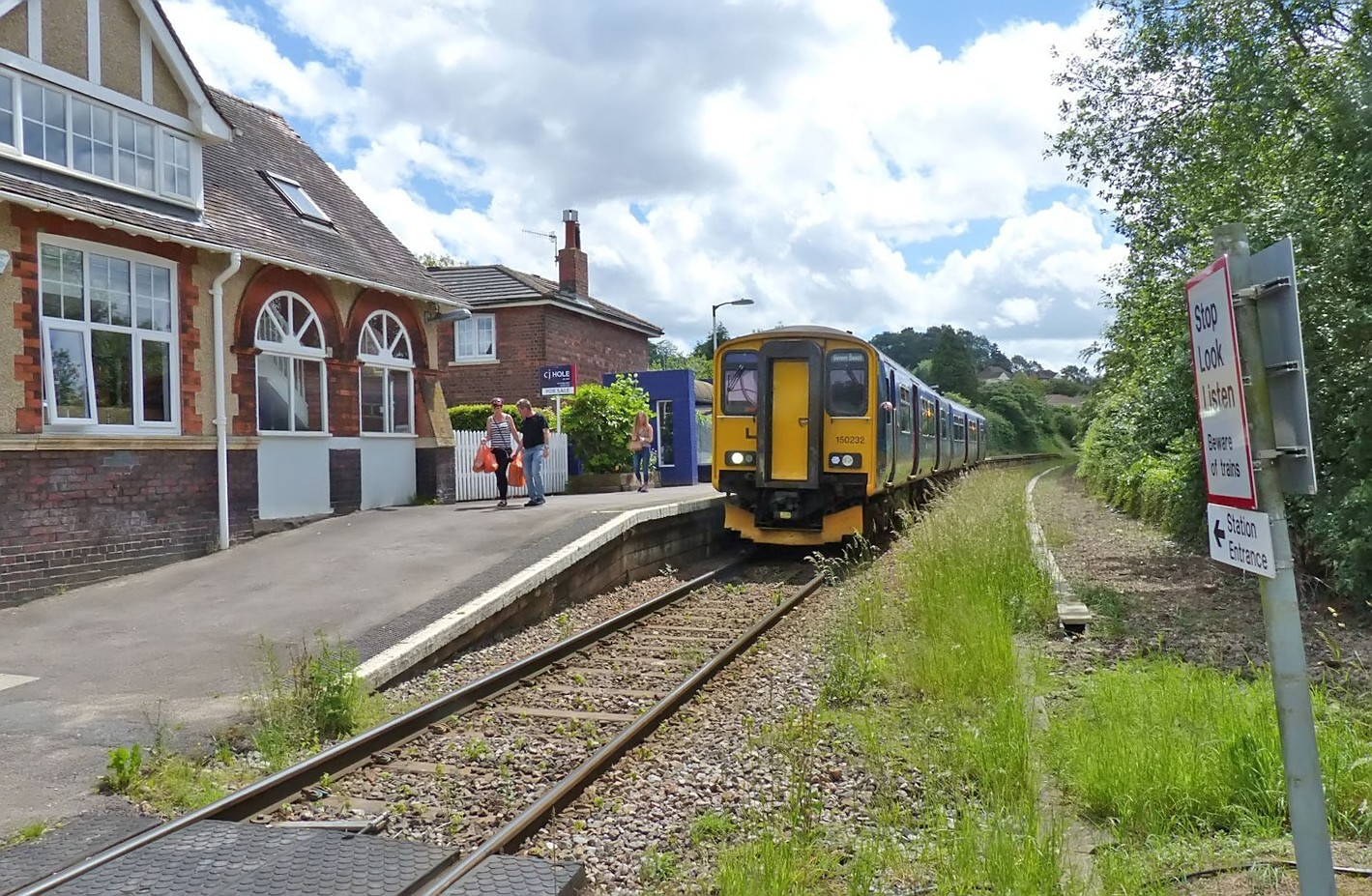
A First Great Western Class 150 Sprinter DMU calls at Sea Mills with a train for Severn Beach in 2014. Trains such as these displaced the Pacer DMUs which had previously operated the line.

First Great Western declined a contractual option to continue the Greater Western passenger franchise (of which services at Sea Mills are a part) beyond 2013, citing a desire for a longer-term contract due to the impending upgrade to the Great Western Main Line. The franchise was put out to tender, but the process was halted and later scrapped due to the fallout from the collapse of the InterCity West Coast franchise competition. A two-year franchise extension until September 2015 was agreed in October 2013, and subsequently extended until March 2019.

With the coming upgrade to the Great Western Main Line, the main line from London to Bristol is due to be electrified by 2016. However, the electrification will not extend beyond the main lines, so Sea Mills will continue to be served by diesel trains, with the current "Sprinter" units expected to be replaced by Class 165 and 166 "Turbo" units. Stephen Williams, MP for Bristol West; and the group Friends of Suburban Bristol Railways supports the electrification being extended to the Severn Beach Line.

Improved services at Sea Mills are called for as part of the Greater Bristol Metro scheme, a rail transport plan which aims to enhance transport capacity in the Bristol area. There is an aspiration for half-hourly services, with trains towards Bristol terminating alternately at Portishead and Bath Spa, however due to the large sections of the Severn Beach Line which are single-track and to the congested main line from Temple Meads, such frequency is not currently feasible. The enhancement scheme was given the go-ahead in July 2012 as part of the City Deal, whereby local councils would be given greater control over money by the government. There are also calls for the reopening of the Henbury Loop Line, which could allow a direct service from Sea Mills to Bristol Parkway via Avonmouth. Plans for a loop were rejected by the West of England Joint Transport Board, however Bristol City Councillors voted to send the decision back to the board for further discussion. There are also calls for the second platform at Sea Mills to be reinstated as a passing loop or as part of a restoration of the whole line to double track.

== See also ==
- Rail services in Bristol
