= Hotwells Halt railway station =

Railway station in Bristol, England

Hotwells Halt
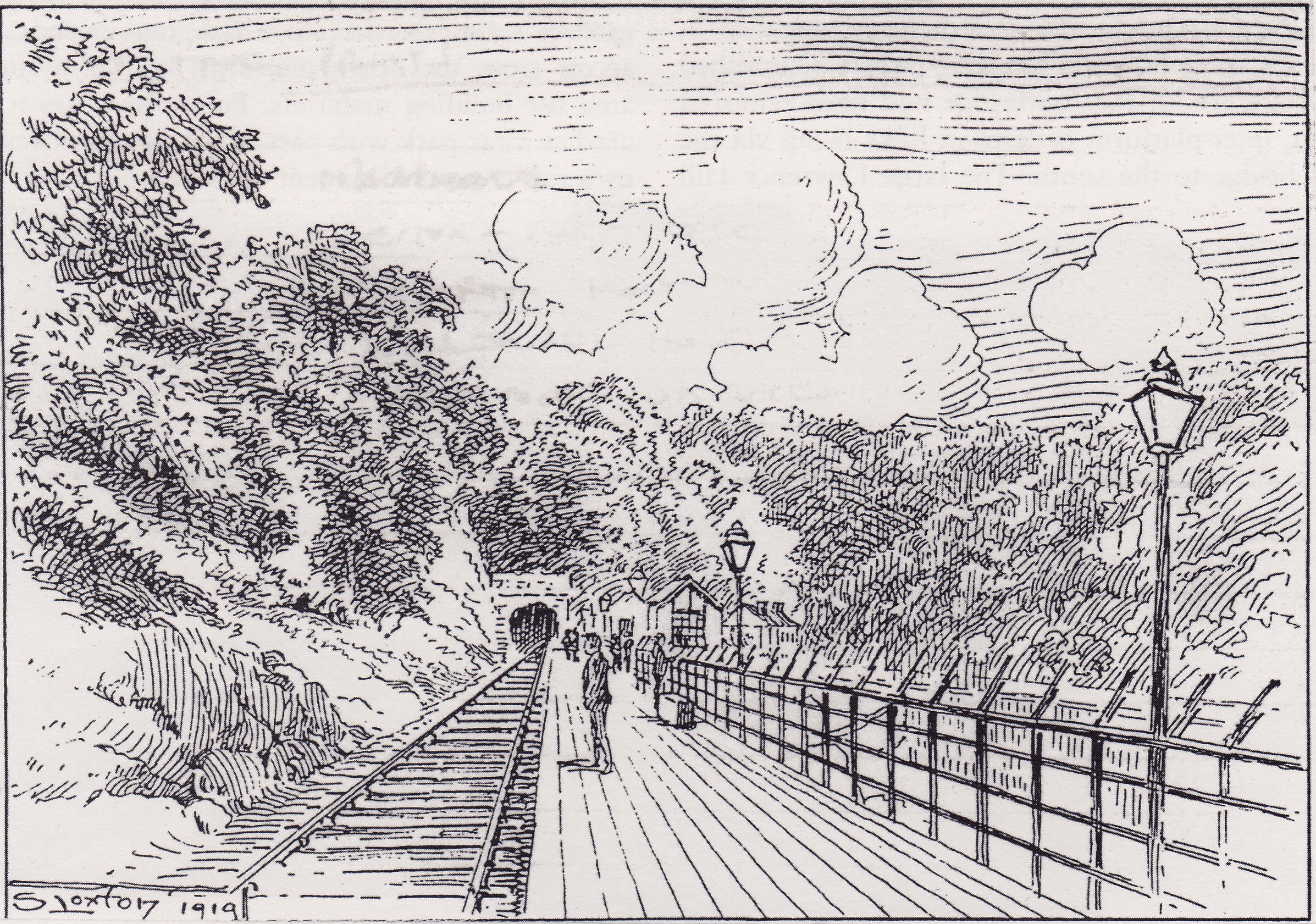
- The only known image of the halt, drawn by Samuel Loxton in 1919.

General information
- Location: Hotwells, City of Bristol; England
- Coordinates: 51.460°N 2.629°W
- Platforms: 1

Other information
- Status: Disused

History
- Original company: Great Western Railway/Midland Railway
- Pre-grouping: Great Western Railway/Midland Railway

Key dates
- 14 May 1917: Opened
- 19 September 1921: Becomes terminus
- 1 July 1922: Final usage
- 3 July 1922: Closed
Location

Hotwells Halt railway station, also known as the Hotwells Extension Platform, was a railway station situated in the suburb of Hotwells in Bristol, England. It was on the Bristol Port Railway and Pier line which ran between Avonmouth and Hotwells. The station opened in 1917, and closed in 1922.

== History ==
Hotwells Halt was built alongside the River Avon, just north of Portnalls Number One Railway Tunnel, a few hundred yards from the main terminus at Hotwells. The station had a single 700 feet (210 m) timber platform, a run-around loop and a siding, all controlled by a signal box at the northern end of the platform. It was constructed in 1917 by the government-controlled Great Western and Midland railways as a wartime expedient, since workmen's trains were too long for the platform at the Hotwells terminus. Some 2,000 dockworkers each day would travel by tram to the terminus, then walk along the riverside to reach Hotwells Halt, where they would buy tickets for Avonmouth. There were two ticket booths, a small one just for Avonmouth tickets, and a larger one for other destinations. Return tickets were valid to Hotwells or Clifton Down, and so after the morning rush few passengers used the halt. The first two services of the day would start at Hotwells Halt, with one return terminating there.

From September 1921, the Halt was the terminus of the BPRP line, as the Hotwells terminus was closed to allow construction of the A4 Portway. Hotwells Halt, and the line to Sneyd Park Junction, closed on 3 July 1922, with the final train running on 1 July.

Preceding station	Disused railways	Following station
Sea Mills	Great Western Railway; Bristol Port Railway and Pier	Hotwells

== See also ==
- Bristol Port Railway and Pier
- Hotwells
