= Clifton Down railway station =

Railway station in Bristol, England

Clifton Down
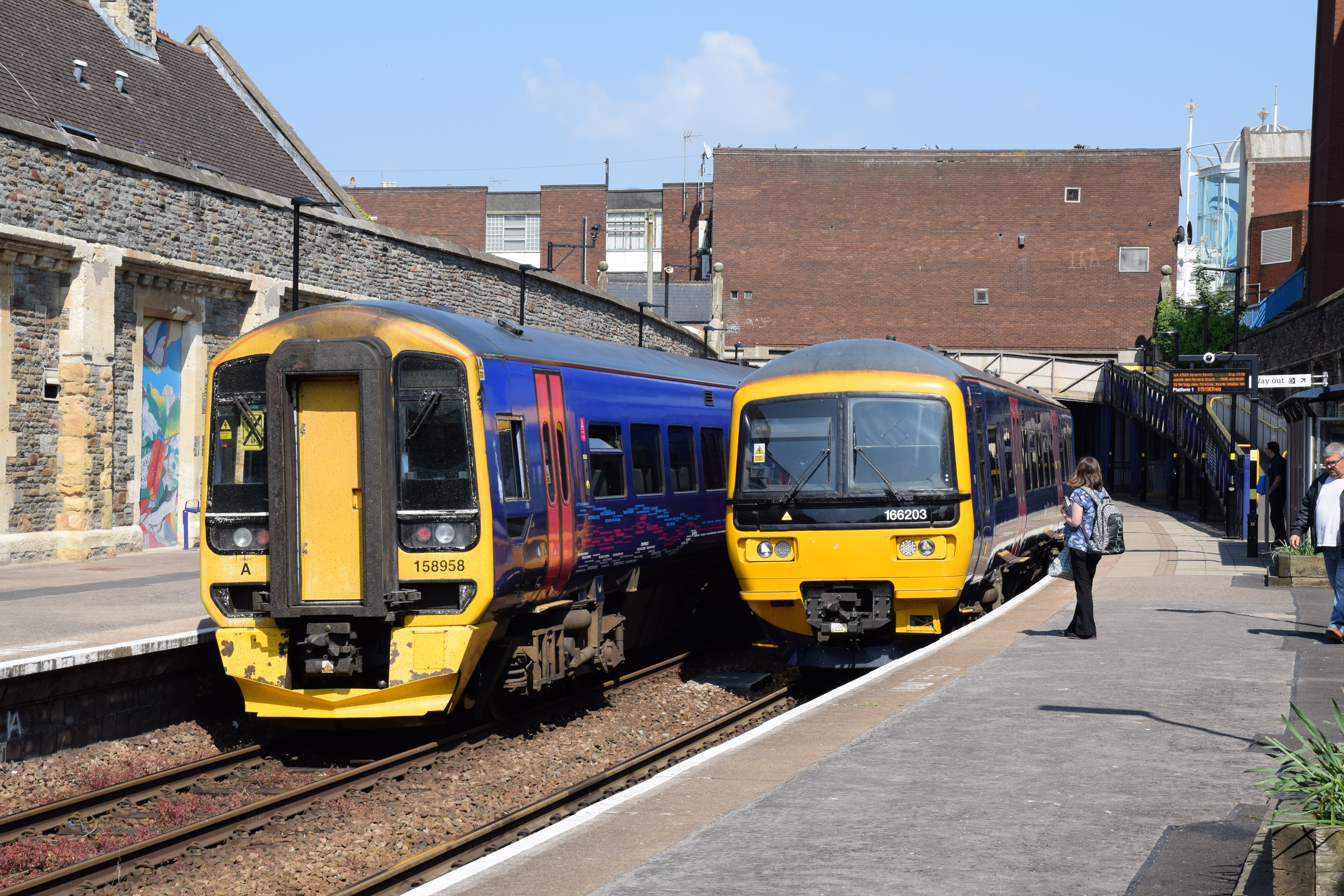

General information
- Location: Clifton, Bristol; England
- Coordinates: 51.4646°N 2.6109°W
- Grid reference: ST576741
- Manager: Great Western Railway
- Platforms: 2

Other information
- Station code: CFN
- Classification: DfT category F2

Key dates
- 1 October 1874: Opened
- 5 July 1965: Closed to goods traffic

Passengers
- 2021/22: ▲0.401 million
- 2022/23: ▲0.609 million
- 2023/24: ▲0.772 million
- 2024/25: ▲0.818 million
- 2025/26: ▲0.834 million
Location
Notes
- Passenger statistics from the Office of Rail and Road

Clifton Down railway station is on the Severn Beach line and serves the district of Clifton in Bristol, England. It is 3.9 miles (6.3 km) from Bristol Temple Meads. Its three letter station code is CFN. The station has two platforms, each serving trains in one direction only. As of 2015 it is managed by Great Western Railway, which is the third franchise to be responsible for the station since privatisation in 1997. They provide all train services at the station, mainly a train every 30 minutes in each direction.

The station was opened in 1874 by the Great Western and Midland Railways as part of the Clifton Extension Railway, designed to connect the port of Avonmouth to the national rail network. The station had a large Gothic Revival building on the Bristol-bound platform, with smaller passenger facilities on the opposite platform and a goods yard beyond. Between 1903 and 1930 the station employed an average of 22 staff. Excursion trains were a regular sight, bringing people to nearby Bristol Zoo.

The Severn Beach Line declined over the latter half of the twentieth century, with passenger numbers falling significantly. Goods services at Clifton Down ended in 1965, and all staff were withdrawn in 1967. The line was largely reduced to single track in 1970, leaving Clifton Down as one of the few passing places. Services had decreased to ten per day each direction by 2005, but have since increased to a train every 30 minutes in each direction.

== History ==
=== Joint railway era ===
The Clifton Extension Railway was opened from Narroways Hill Junction to Clifton Down as a joint venture between the Great Western Railway and Midland Railway to connect their main lines to the Bristol Port Railway and Pier in the Avon Gorge. Clifton Down railway station opened on 1 October 1874, when passenger services began, and was for a while the terminal station. It was the second station along the line from Narroways Hill Junction where the Extension Railway left the Bristol and South Wales Union Railway's main line to Wales. It remained the second station until Redland was opened in 1897. The line was built at 4 ft 8 1/2 in (1,435 mm) standard gauge.

The station was built by Messrs Baker & Son of Canon's Marsh, Bristol. The buildings, constructed in a Gothic Revival style, cost £20,000, with the main buildings on the northern platform. There was a large booking hall with sizeable fireplaces at each end. Pointed ground floor doorways gave access to the hall, which was adjacent to the booking offices and waiting rooms. It is believed that the station master's lodgings in this building were never used as such. A wide carriage drive led down to the northern platform, which was linked to the southern platform by a glass-covered footbridge. There was originally no waiting room on the southern platform, but one was built in October 1898. The platforms were mostly covered by "ridge and furrow" glass roofs, supported by iron columns. The station was flooded in August 1883, which resulted in the installation of extra drainage. There was a large goods yard to the south of the platforms, accessed from the west, with a 28-lever signal box at the west end of the southern platform.

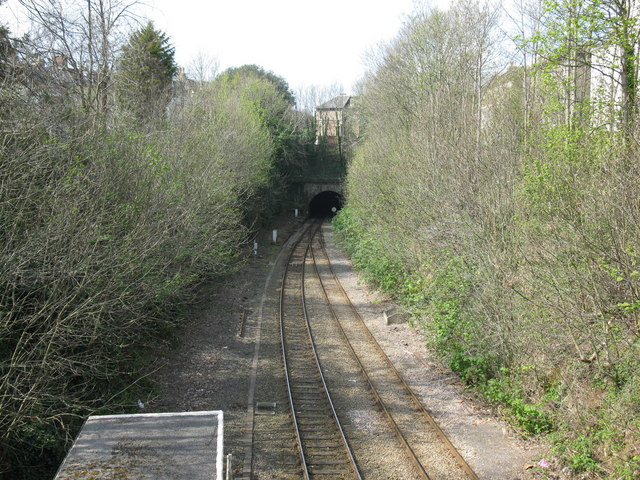
The Clifton Down Tunnel is just to the west of the station. The tunnel was opened to freight in 1877, and to passengers in 1885.

The initial service provided at Clifton Down by the Midland Railway was to Fishponds and Mangotsfield, where passengers could change for services to Bath, Birmingham and other Midland destinations. The Great Western provided services from Clifton Down to Bristol Temple Meads, the city's major station, where passengers could change for trains to London, Exeter and Wales, among others. The Great Western also provided occasional through services to Weston-super-Mare. There were a total of 23 trains in each direction between the two companies Monday-Saturday. On Sundays, there was no Midland service, but seven Great Western trains. The fare to Temple Meads was 6d first-class and 3d third-class. The Clifton Down Tunnel, the final link to the Bristol Port Railway and Pier, was opened in 1877, initially allowing freight trains to reach Avonmouth Docks. It was not until 1885 that it was cleared for passenger use, which allowed services to Avonmouth via Sea Mills and Shirehampton. There was a trial Midland service between Bristol St Philip's and Avonmouth in September 1885, but this was ended after a month. In 1886, the daily Great Western service was six trains each way between Avonmouth and Temple Meads, 24 trains from Clifton Down to Temple Meads and 26 the other direction. The Midland provided 12 services from Clifton Down to Fishponds, and 11 back.

Clifton Down had large numbers of excursion trains, both arriving and departing. There were regular trains during the summer season to Weston-super-Mare and Clevedon, as well as to Weymouth, London and, more locally, football specials to Ashton Gate. There were also regular excursion trains, known as "Monkey Specials" for visitors to the nearby Bristol Zoo. In 1886, the Bath and West Show being held on Durdham Down generated some 33,000 extra passengers over five days, with direct services from Bath Green Park and an extra 16 services from Temple Meads. The Show was held on Durdham Down again in 1921, temporarily increasing traffic from Temple Meads by 12 trains per day, although there was increased competition from local bus services. The station also received visits from King Edward VII in 1902 and 1908, and from a delegation of British Empire Prime Ministers in 1907.

The line had initially been managed by the Clifton Extension Railway Joint Committee, but in 1894 the line's management was passed to the Great Western & Midland Railways Joint Committee. In 1909, the station master at Redland was withdrawn, his duties incorporated into the job of Clifton Down station master. In 1910, Clifton Down saw 17 Great Western services from Avonmouth to Temple Meads and 15 the other way, a further 20 trains each day operating between Clifton and Temple Meads, and 13 Midland trains each way between Clifton and Fishponds or Mangotsfield. Midland services were suspended from 1 January 1917 to 15 May 1919 due to the First World War. The Hotwells section of the Bristol Port Railway and Pier closed in 1922, so to compensate, an additional six trains were provided from Clifton Down to Avonmouth, and four back.

In 1923, grouping resulted in the Midland Railway being absorbed into the London, Midland and Scottish Railway (LMS), and the line continued in a joint arrangement between the Great Western and the LMS. From 1924, many trains to Avonmouth were extended to Severn Beach, a growing seaside resort, and some on to Pilning, then back to Temple Meads via Patchway. Between 1903 and 1930 the station employed an average of 22 staff, and in 1926 the station master assumed control over Montpelier as well. The platform canopies were partially removed in the 1930s, and bomb-damage during the Bristol Blitz saw them cut back further. The war also saw the end of services to Fishponds and Mangotsfield, the last operating on 31 March 1941. By 1947, just before the start of the British Rail era, there were 33 services each direction between Avonmouth and Temple Meads, and 18 on Sundays. Some trains made circular trips to and from Temple Meads via Clifton Down and Henbury or Pilning.

=== British Rail and privatisation ===
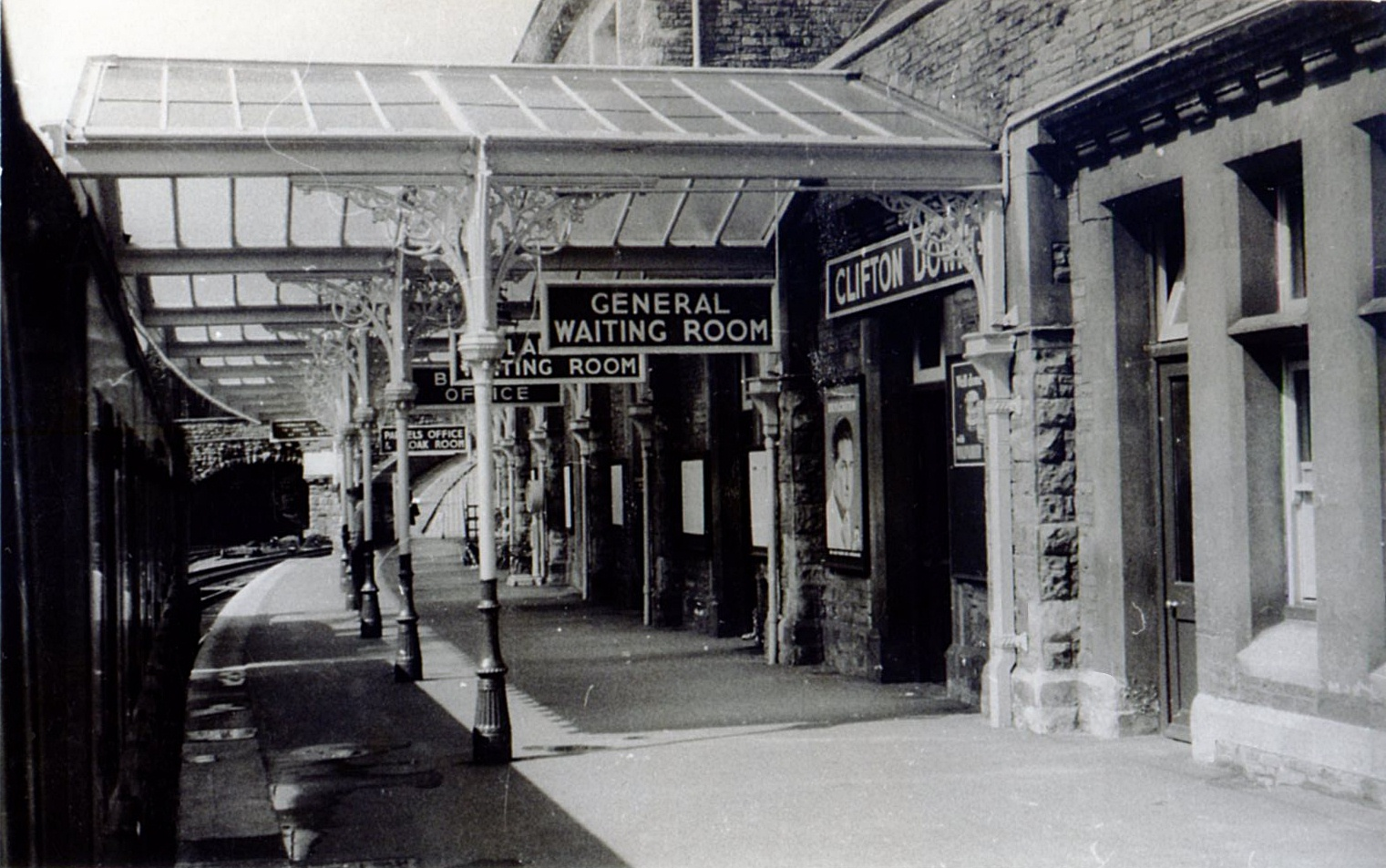
The Bristol-bound platform in 1956, with the glass canopy.

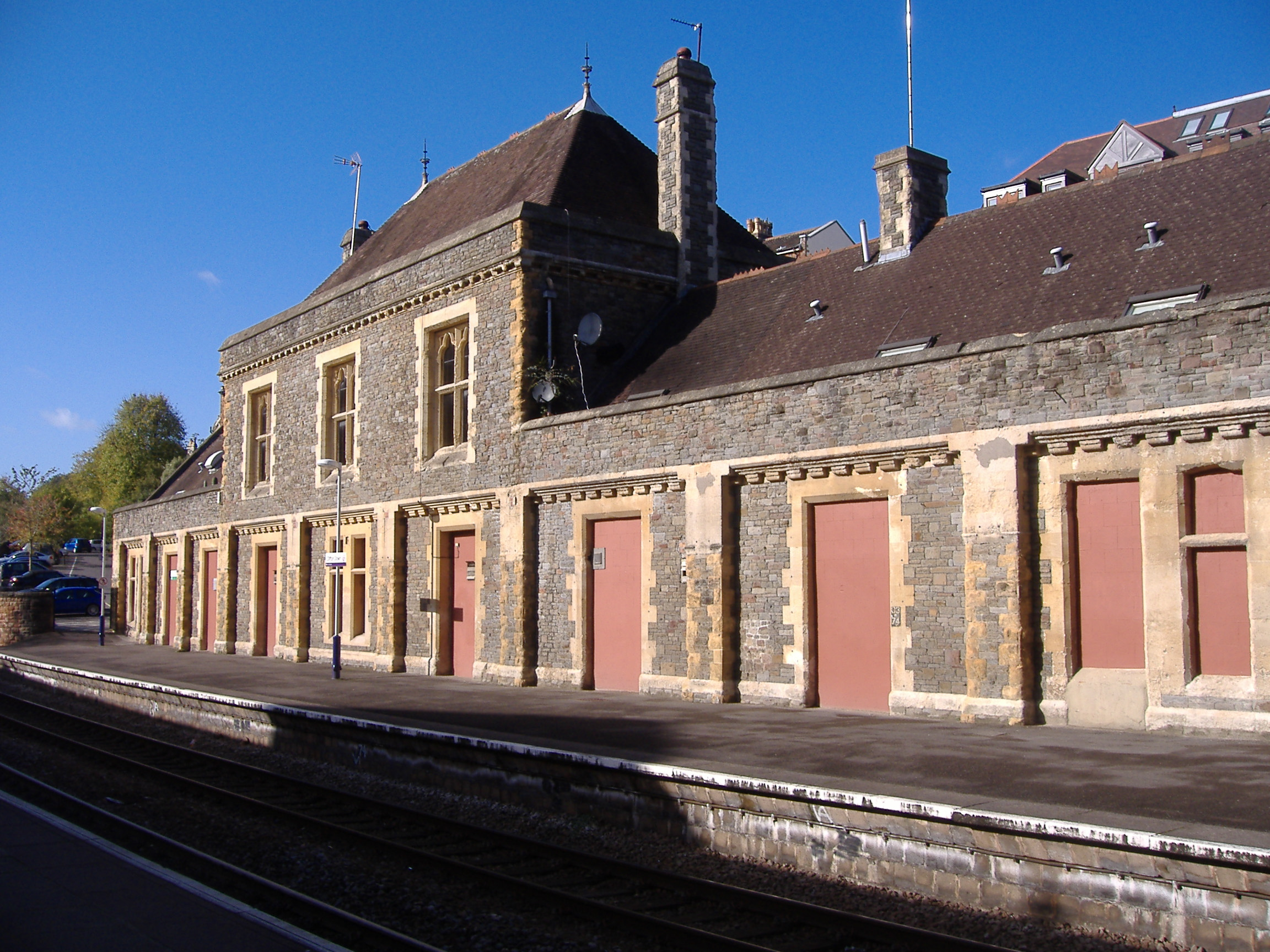
The old station building is no longer accessible from the platforms, having been closed in 1967. It is currently in use as a pub.

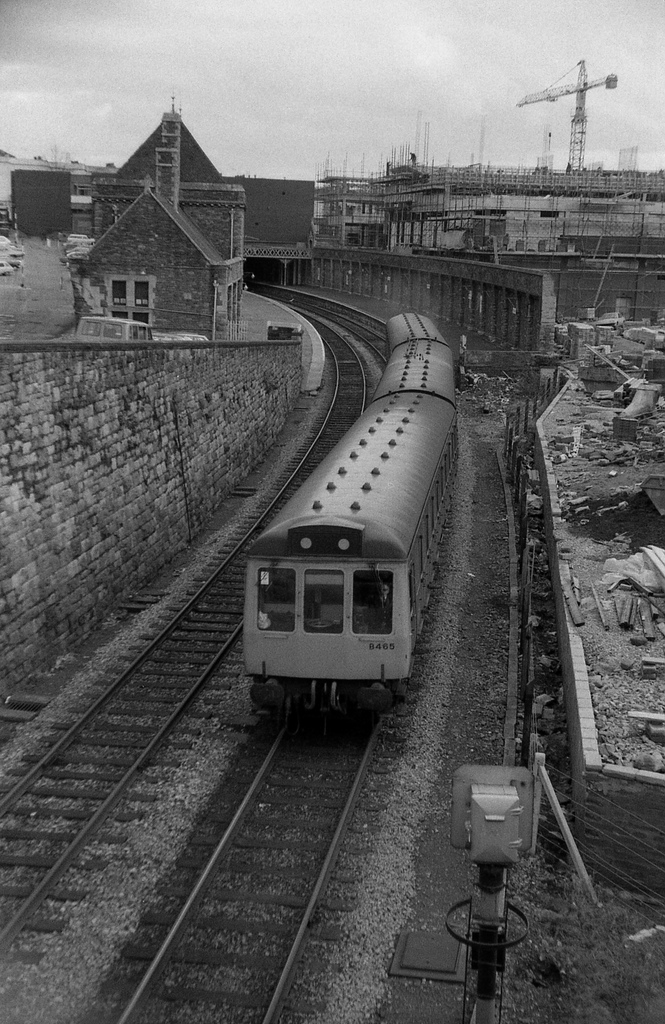
The Clifton Down Shopping Centre was built on the site of the goods yard in the early 1980s.

When the railways were nationalised in 1948, services at Clifton Down came under the aegis of the Western Region of British Railways, and there remained a strong staff presence in 1958, with a station master, chief booking clerk, four other clerks, six porters, a shunter, a checker and a weighbridge assistant. Passenger numbers however dropped sharply in 1961 as the result of a fare increase, and so in 1962 a new reduced timetable was enacted, which lost more passengers, and saw the withdrawal of a special schoolchildren's service. A year later in 1963, the Beeching report suggested that all services along the Severn Beach Line be withdrawn. Following meetings with staff, it was decided to keep the line open to Severn Beach, but to close the section to Pilning, and also end services via Henbury. These services duly ended, and in July 1965 the goods yard at Clifton Down also closed. The line however was still threatened, and on 10 February 1967 it was announced that all services between Stapleton Road and Severn Beach would be discontinued. An enquiry followed, and in June that year the decision was reversed, on the condition that tickets be issued on the trains. Thus, on 17 July 1967, all stations along the line, including Clifton Down, had their staff withdrawn. The decrease of costs allowed a reduction of ticket prices, but the line was still under threat until in June 1969 it was decided that the line's closure would result in significant hardship, and so a grant was allocated to ensure continued services. Service levels however still declined: though the "Monkey Specials" were still going strong into the 1960s, with 340,000 excursion passengers arriving between 1958 and 1966, the closure of many of the Welsh Valley Lines and the construction of the Severn Bridge led to their demise in the early 1970s. Most of the Severn Beach Line was reduced to single track in late 1970, leaving Clifton Down as one of the few passing places. The glass platform canopies were completely removed in May 1971, and the glass-covered footbridge was also removed, leaving a set of steps from Whiteladies road as the only access to the southern platform. In the late 1970s and the early 1980s, the Clifton Down Shopping Centre was built over most of the goods yard, the rest covered by a housing development.

British Rail was split into business-led sectors in the 1980s, at which time operations at Clifton Down passed to Regional Railways. A programme of refurbishment was carried out in 1992/3, including the installation of a new metal footbridge and ramp access to the southern platform. In December 1994, the station building, which had been bricked up when staff were withdrawn, and was by then the Steam Tavern public house, was designated a grade II listed building, along with the screen walls. The pub was revived in the mid-2000s as the Roo Bar, an Australian-themed bar. At this time, all trains ran to Severn Beach, but the service pattern was irregular. This changed in 1995 when an hourly timetable was introduced for peak times, but services were terminated at Avonmouth, allowing a single Sprinter unit to work the service. There was a better service on Saturdays as more rolling stock was available, but there was no Sunday service. Talk arose again of the line being closed completely. Local tourism expert Bernard Lane described the line's state as

... the line the railway wished was not there. It was the line that got bus substitution whenever they were short of trains or queues, when a rugby match in Cardiff needed a special. It has a problem in that the route is slow and not very direct; for years it was invisible, short of marketing and lacking a regular interval timetable.

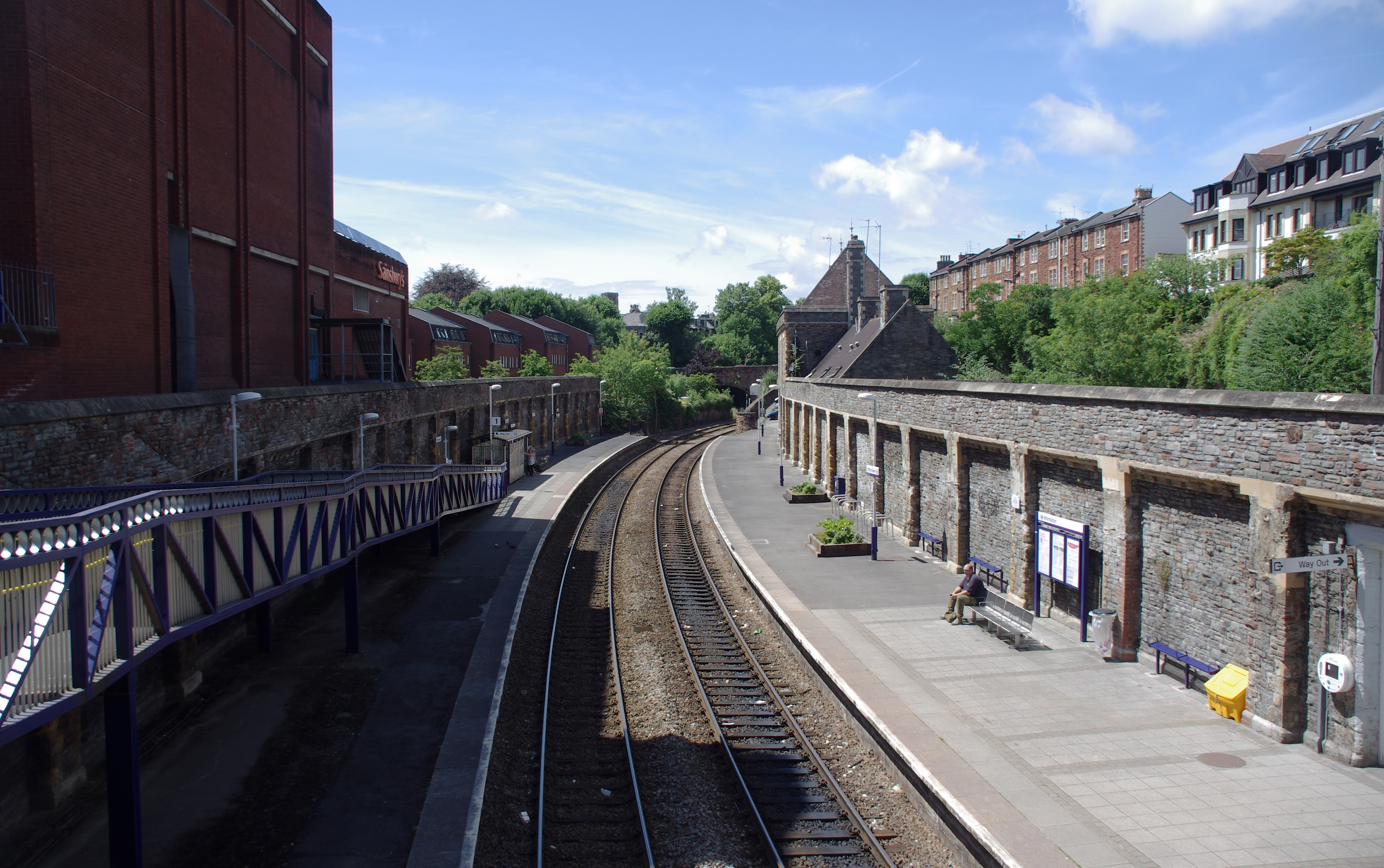
The majority of the Severn Beach Line was reduced to single track in 1970, leaving Clifton Down as one of the few passing places.

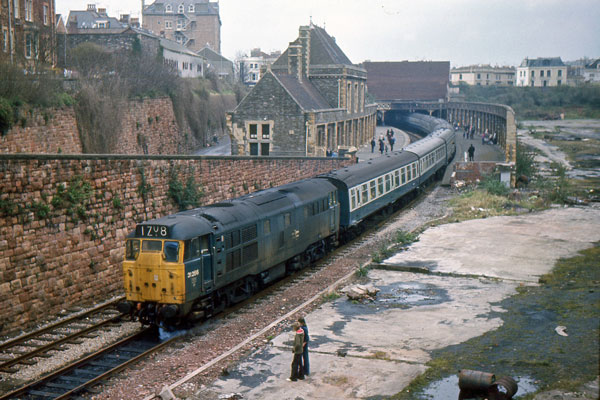
A Bristol Zoo excursion train at Clifton Down in the 1970s.

When the railway was privatised in 1997, local services were franchised to Wales & West, which was succeeded by Wessex Trains, an arm of National Express, in 2001. Following action by Friends of Severn Beach Railway (FOSBR) and a string of protests, services had increased to 10 per day in each direction by 2005, with Bristol City Council providing a subsidy to Wessex Trains. The Wessex franchise was amalgamated with the Great Western franchise into the Greater Western franchise from 2006, and responsibility passed to First Great Western, a subsidiary company of FirstGroup, rebranded in 2015 as Great Western Railway. A minimum service requirement was written into the franchise agreement, ensuring an hourly service along the line. In 2007, the Council unanimously agreed to pay £450,000 per annum to fund extra services from May 2008 for three years, which resulted in a 60% increase in passenger numbers along the line, and a 110% increase at Clifton Down. Sunday services to Severn Beach were restored in 2010.

Passenger numbers at Clifton Down were further boosted by a marketing campaign by the Severnside Community Rail Partnership to attract more people, especially students, to use the station. The work won a Department for Transport Community Rail Marketing Award in 2007. The Severnside CRP also formed a support group for the station, and improved the provision of timetabling information through the use of simplified departure timetable posters. In 2009, they painted a large station sign on the road bridge over the line, and in 2010 they collaborated with Redland Green School to decorate the bricked-up windows and doors of the station building with animal artwork to brighten up the station and promote Bristol Zoo. The work won a Community Rail Award. Customer help points with next train information screens were installed during 2008/09, paid for by money from the Department for Transport's "Access for All" fund and local councils. Ticket machines were installed in early 2011, following complaints that passengers were unable to pay their fares. The station building was again renamed in 2016, and is now the Steam Bristol beer hall and rotisserie.

Preceding station	Historical railways	Following station
Sea Mills	Western Region of British Railways; Severn Beach Line (1948–1982)	Redland
Sea Mills	Regional Railways; Severn Beach Line (1982–1997)	Redland
Sea Mills	Wales & West; Severn Beach Line (1997–2001)	Redland
Sea Mills	Wessex Trains; Severn Beach Line (2001–2006)	Redland

== Description ==
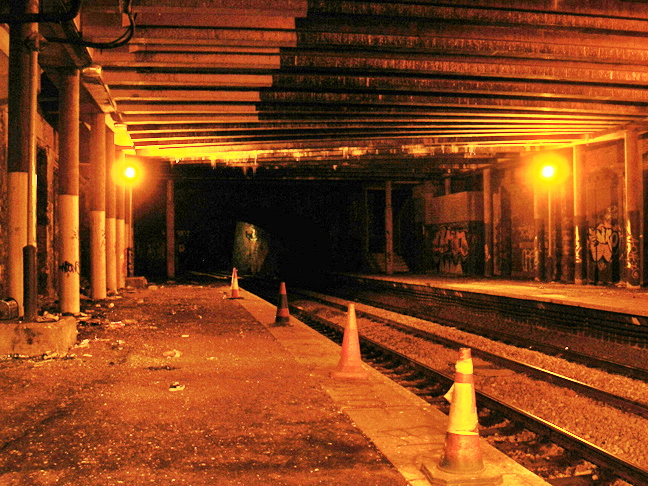
The line goes under Whiteladies Road and a small shopping area at the east end of the station.

Clifton Down railway station is on the Severn Beach Line, serving the district of Clifton in Bristol. The station is located on the busy shopping street Whiteladies Road, next door to a shopping centre. The wider area is largely residential. Bristol Zoo is under a mile away. The station is located 3 miles 72 chains (6.3 km) along the line from Bristol Temple Meads, and 9 miles 51 chains (15.5 km) from Severn Beach. (Note: Railways in the United Kingdom are, for historical reasons, measured in miles and chains. There are 80 chains to the mile.) It is the fifth station from Temple Meads. There are two running lines, roughly orientated east–west, but curving towards the north at both ends. There are two 120-yard (110 m)-long platforms to the north and south of the running lines, connected by a footbridge at the east end. The southern platform, Platform 1, serves trains towards Avonmouth, the northern platform, Platform 2, serves trains towards Temple Meads. The station is in an enclosed cutting, and runs under the road to the east. To the west is the Clifton Down Tunnel under Clifton Down, from which the station takes its name. The station is one of the few double track sections of the Severn Beach Line, and so is often used as a passing place.

Facilities at the station are minimal – shelters, benches and timetable information are provided. Customer help points give live train information. There is no ticket office but there is one ticket machine which can be used to buy or collect tickets. The station car park is to the north of the platforms, with 40 spaces. There is step-free access to the northern platform from the car park, and a set of steps from the footbridge. There is also stepped access to the footbridge from the south, and a ramp down to the southern platform. There is no taxi rank, but there are bus stops on Whiteladies Road. Cycle storage is available on the platform.

The disused station building's bricked-up windows and doors feature artwork of animals created by students at Redland Green School, and promote links with nearby Bristol Zoo. The building is accessible from the car park, and houses an Australian-themed pub. It is a Grade II listed building.

== Services ==
All services at Clifton Down are operated by Great Western Railway using Class 166 Turbo DMUs.

The typical off-peak service in trains per hour is:

- 2 tph to Bristol Temple Meads of which 1 continues to Weston-super-Mare
- 2 tph to Avonmouth of which 1 continues to Severn Beach

On Sundays, there is an hourly service between Bristol Temple Meads and Severn Beach with one train per day to and from Weston-super-Mare.

Services previously ran every 40 minutes in each direction but were increased to half-hourly in the December 2021 timetable change.

Preceding station	National Rail	Following station
Sea Mills	Great Western Railway Severn Beach Line	Redland

Preceding station	Historical railways	Following station
Terminus	Midland Railway; Clifton Extension Railway (1874-1897)	Montpelier
Terminus	Midland Railway; Clifton Extension Railway (1897-1917, 1919-1922)	Redland
Terminus	London, Midland and Scottish Railway; Clifton Extension Railway (1922-1941)	Redland
Terminus	Great Western Railway; Clifton Extension Railway (1874-1885)	Montpelier
Sea Mills	Great Western Railway; Clifton Extension Railway (1885-1897)	Montpelier
Sea Mills	Great Western Railway; Clifton Extension Railway (1897-1948)	Redland

== Future ==
First Great Western declined a contractual option to continue the Greater Western passenger franchise (of which services at Clifton Down are a part) beyond 2013, citing a desire for a longer-term contract due to the impending upgrade to the Great Western Main Line. The franchise was put out to tender, but the process was halted and later scrapped due to the fallout from the collapse of the InterCity West Coast franchise competition. A two-year franchise extension until September 2015 was agreed in October 2013, and subsequently extended until March 2019.

With the coming upgrade to the Great Western Main Line, the main line from London to Bristol is due to be electrified by 2016. However, the electrification will not extend beyond the main lines, so Clifton Down will continue to be served by diesel trains, with the current "Sprinter" units expected to be replaced by Class 165 and 166 "Turbo" units. Stephen Williams, former MP for Bristol West, questioned whether electrification could continue to Clifton Down. Then-Secretary of State for Transport Philip Hammond replied that it would have to be looked at in the future. The group Friends of Suburban Bristol Railways supports the electrification of the entire Severn Beach Line.

Improved services at Clifton Down are called for as part of the Greater Bristol Metro scheme, a rail transport plan which aims to enhance transport capacity in the Bristol area. There is an aspiration for half-hourly services, with trains towards Bristol terminating alternately at Portishead and Bath Spa, however due to the large sections of the Severn Beach Line which are single-track and to the congested main line from Temple Meads, such frequency is not currently feasible. The scheme was given the go-ahead in July 2012 as part of the City Deal, whereby local councils would be given greater control over money by the government. There are also calls for the reopening of the Henbury Loop Line, which could allow a direct service from Clifton Down to Bristol Parkway via Avonmouth. Plans for a loop were rejected by the West of England Joint Transport Board, however Bristol City Councillors voted to send the decision back to the board for further discussion.

== See also ==
- Rail services in Bristol
