= Clifton Rocks Railway =

Former funicular railway in Bristol, England (1893–1934)

Coordinates: 51°27′14.4″N 2°37′31.7″W

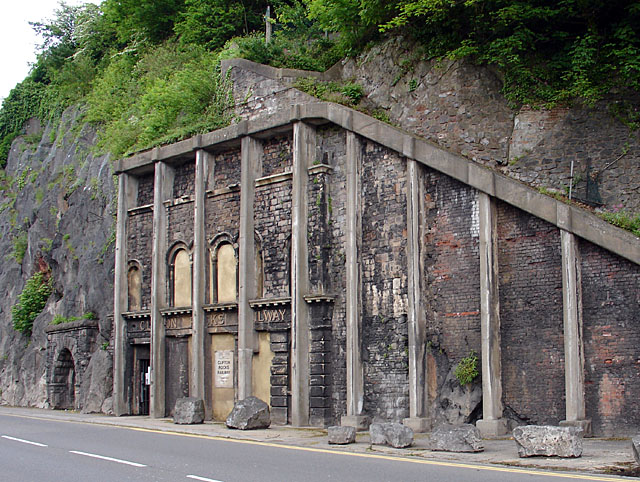
- Clifton Rocks Railway lower station

Overview
- Locale: Hotwells, Bristol (grid reference ST565730)
- Stations: 2
- Website: cliftonrocksrailway.com

Service
- Type: Underground funicular

History
- Opened: 11 March 1893
- Closed: 1 October 1934

Technical
- Track gauge: Uncertain

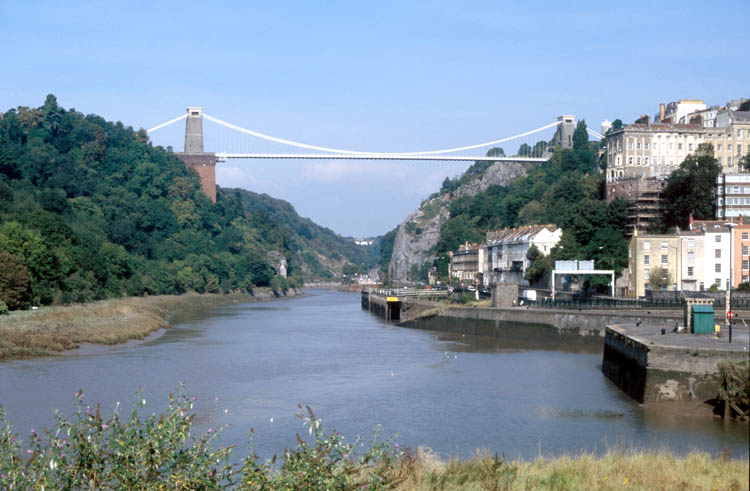
The Avon Gorge. The Clifton Rocks Railway ran from a lower station just beyond the furthest buildings at river level, through a tunnel to an upper station at bridge level.

The Clifton Rocks Railway was an underground funicular in Bristol, England, linking Clifton at the top to Hotwells and Bristol Harbour at the bottom of the Avon Gorge in a tunnel cut through the limestone cliffs.

The upper station is close to Brunel's famous Clifton Suspension Bridge and is located adjacent to the former Grand Spa Hotel (now the Avon Gorge Hotel). The lower station was opposite the paddle steamer landing ferries in Hotwells, Hotwells railway station of the Bristol Port Railway and Pier, a terminus of Bristol Tramways and the Rownham ferry enabling connections across the river Avon.

== History ==
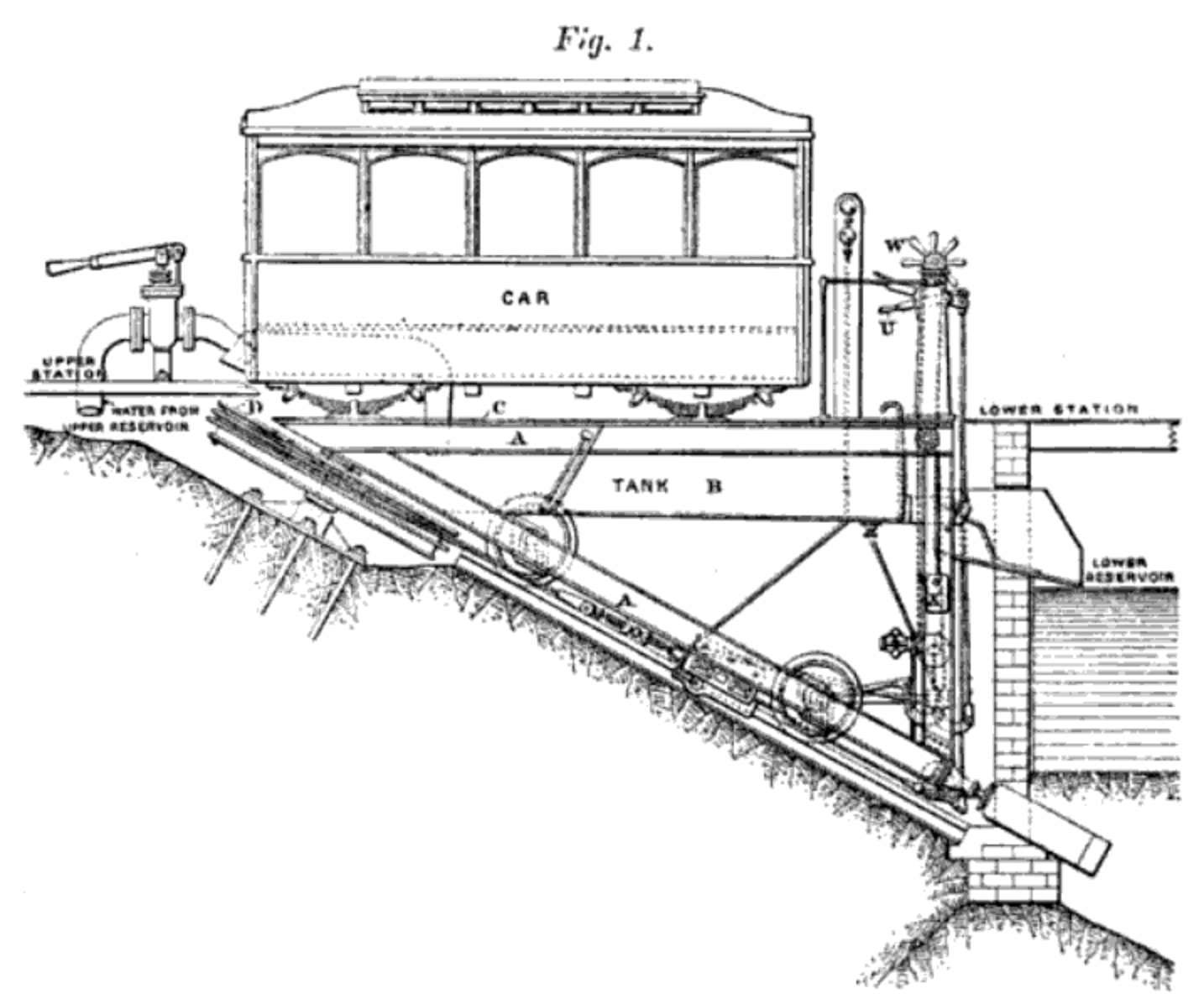
Diagram showing the design of the Clifton Rocks Railway

Construction of the railway was funded by the publisher George Newnes, also proprietor of the Lynton and Lynmouth Cliff Railway, and as at Lynton and Lynmouth the engineer was George Croydon Marks. Construction of the line started in March 1891. The 28-foot (8.5 m) wide tunnel was bored through the limestone cliffs using both machine-drills and hand-drills and then lined with bricks. It took two years to construct and cost £30,000 (equivalent to £3,300,000 in 2025) – three times its original estimate. Propulsion was by the water-balance method, in which the cars of each pair were connected by a cable running around a pulley at the upper station; a large tank on each car was filled with water at the top and the extra weight provided the motive power.

The railway opened on 11 March 1893 and carried 6,220 passengers on the opening day, and 427,492 in the first year of operation.

After this strong start, passenger numbers steadily declined until 1908, when the company was declared bankrupt. In 1912 it was sold to Bristol Tramways, for £1,500 (equivalent to £148,000 in 2025). In 1922 Hotwell Road was enlarged as a fast road called Portway, eliminating the tram to Bristol and the Bristol Port and Pier Railway Hotwells railway station near the bottom of the Cliff Railway. The changes caused passenger numbers to drop sharply, and the last train ran on 29 September 1934.

During the Second World War blast walls were installed in the tunnel, which was used as offices by BOAC, as a relay station by the BBC, who also constructed seven emergency studios there, and as an air-raid shelter for local residents. The BBC continued to use parts of the tunnel until 1960.

== Operations ==
The railway was 450 feet (137 m) long, and rose 200 feet (61 m) at a gradient of about 1 in 2.2 (45%). There were four cars in two connected pairs, essentially forming two parallel funicular railways, one being for exclusively first class passengers; the journey took just 40 seconds. The gauge of the tracks has reported as being between 3 ft (914 mm) and 3 ft 8 1/2 in (1,130 mm) with two other sources giving the gauge as 3 ft 2 in (965 mm) and about 3 ft 2 1/4 in (972 mm).

The system operated by gravity. At the upper station, water was fed from a reservoir into the tank underneath the car. The extra weight of this water was enough to pull a loaded car up from the lower station. When the car with its water ballast reached the lower station, the water was discharged into another reservoir, from where it was pumped back up to the upper reservoir to restart the cycle. The pumps were originally powered by a pair of Otto engines at the bottom of the tunnel.

== Preservation ==
A voluntary group, which in 2008 became a charitable trust, aims to preserve and restore the railway and wartime structures. It is not feasible or desirable to get the railway to run again due to the war-time structures sitting on the railway lines. The cost of complete restoration is estimated at around £15 million.

In 2019 a proposal to turn the top section into a museum was announced.

== See also ==
- List of funicular railways
