= Benjamin Burleigh =

Benjamin Burleigh (1820 – 1876) was an English civil engineer. He was born in Oxford on 24 May 1820.

== Career ==
He started work at age 15 and had carried out many large parish surveys by age 19. He then made drawings and designs for bridges on the Eastern Counties Railway under George Landmann and John Braithwaite. From about 1845, he worked on the construction of the East Lincolnshire Railway and, from 1849, on the construction of the Great Northern Railway between London and Peterborough. His designs included an aqueduct over the Regent's Canal and the viaduct at Peterborough.

In 1853, he made drawings for an underground railway from King's Cross, London to the Mansion House but the scheme did not come to fruition. From 1862 to 1863 he supervised the construction of the Bristol Port Railway. After this, he supervised the construction of the East London Railway through the Thames Tunnel. In 1872 he was appointed Southern Division Architect at the York office of the North Eastern Railway, where he remained until his death.

== Family life ==
In 1847, he married Georgiana Curtis. Their third son Alfred Benjamin, born 1853, also worked for the North Eastern Railway. In 1885, Alfred Benjamin Burleigh married Louisa, a daughter of the artist Edwin Moore.

== Death ==
Benjamin Burleigh died at his home in Priory Street, York, on 25 April 1876.
