= Portway, Bristol =

A4 road in Bristol, UK

Coordinates: 51.47652°N 2.64882°W

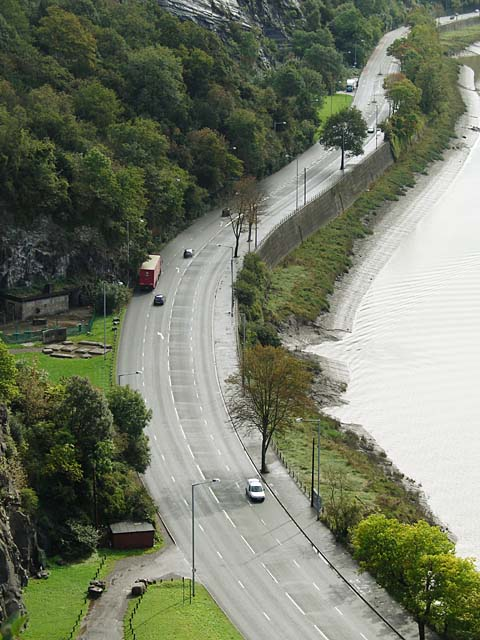
The Portway running alongside the Avon Gorge

The Portway is a major road in the City of Bristol. It is part of the A4 and connects Bristol City Centre to the Avonmouth Docks and the M5 motorway via the Avon Gorge.

The road was constructed following World War I in order to provide improved access to the ports at Avonmouth Docks, which had replaced Bristol Harbour as the major local centre for commercial shipping. Upon opening on 2 July 1926, it was the single most expensive road project in Britain, costing £800,000 (now about £42 million). The construction posed a number of significant engineering challenges, including long and deep rock cuttings, a viaduct over the River Trym, and retaining walls against the gorge adjacent to the River Avon. Falling rocks have since been a problem along the Portway, particularly at the southern end close to the Clifton Suspension Bridge, with concrete canopies constructed to prevent loose rock and assist with remedial work.

The Portway remains an important route to and from Bristol, and is now used as part of the Portway Park and Ride scheme. In the 21st century, the road has been regularly shut to motor traffic for maintenance, providing sporting events such as the Bristol Half Marathon, or to allow locals to enjoy a traffic-free view of the Avon Gorge.

== Route ==
The road is about 5 miles (8 km) long. Commonly it's thought to start in Hotwells, however, it starts at the junction of Bridge Valley Road and Hotwell Road below the Clifton Suspension Bridge and runs alongside the Avon Gorge, parallel to the River Avon. It passes through the suburb of Sea Mills, where it crosses the River Trym, and Shirehampton, before terminating at a roundabout in Avonmouth at a junction with the M5 motorway and A403 road.

For much of its length the Portway is close to the Severn Beach railway line. Sea Mills and Shirehampton stations are near the Portway, but they have no immediate access to it. First Bus run the Portway Park and Ride service, which is also a commuter service passing through some of the suburbs. Although FirstGroup run the majority of bus services around Bristol, none of their other services apart from the Portway Park and Ride stop on the Portway - however the X5 uses it as an access route to the M5.

== Construction ==
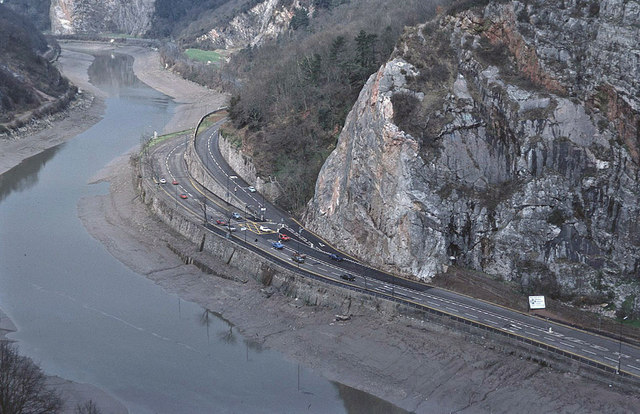
Construction of the Portway was difficult owing to the unstable and unpredictable rock gorge and the presence of the River Avon.

The Portway was planned by the Bristol Corporation in response to the decline of Bristol Harbour in the late 19th century in favour of Avonmouth Docks, which could handle larger vessels and containers. Construction started in May 1919, engineered by L. S. McKenzie. The southern section connected to the existing road network at Hotwells, and a portion of the new road near Clifton lay partly on the line of the Bristol Port Railway. The new build did not directly connect to Avonmouth Docks, but linked to the existing road via Shirehampton about half a mile from the dock gates. The original plan was to build a tramway along the length of the road, which would have linked Avonmouth to the Bristol Tramway system, but this was abandoned owing to cost.

The largest cutting on the construction was at Horseshoe Bend. It was 2,400 feet (730 m) long and cut 90 feet (27 m) into the rock at its deepest point. Upstream from this, a viaduct was needed to span the River Trym and the remains of an early 18th century harbour. It was composed of six 42-foot, 6-inch (12.95 m) arches, with abutments embedded in the rock 14 feet (4.3 m) below. It was supported by three piers at 17 feet (5.2 m), 21 feet (6.4 m) and 40 feet (12 m) below road level. Construction of the viaduct was delayed owing to the tidal flow of the River Avon and the irregularity of the rock. A skew girder bridge was constructed to cross the Severn Beach Railway near Sea Mills station, with foundations up to 55 feet (17 m) below the surface. Around 3,000 feet (910 m) of retaining wall was required at the Bristol end, where the road was sandwiched between the River Avon and the side of the gorge. In September 1924, approximately 200 yards (180 m) of newly constructed concrete embankment slid into the river following ground subsidence, posing a hazard to navigation and adding 12 months to the duration of the work, though there were no injuries.

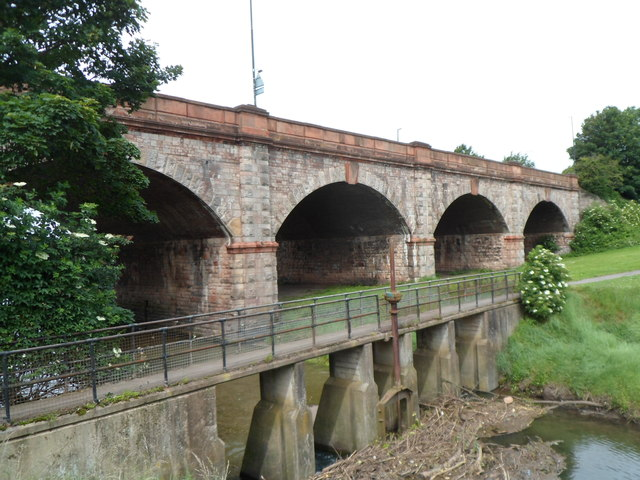
The Portway crosses the River Trym on a six-arch viaduct near Sea Mills.

The Portway was opened by the Minister of Transport, Colonel Wilfrid Ashley with the Lord Mayor of Bristol, Alderman Moore, on 2 July 1926. Following an opening ceremony, the Minister and Lord Mayor drove along the full extent of the road from Bristol to inspect the docks at Avonmouth. It was the most expensive road construction project in Britain, costing £800,000 (now £42,278,000). Of that, £160,000 (now £8,456,000) was spent on the cutting at Horseshoe Bend, £80,000 (now £4,228,000) on the Trym viaduct, and £33,000 (now £1,744,000) on the steel girder bridge.

Electric lighting was provided to illuminate the new road, but for one year after the opening the lights were kept switched off following objections from river pilots who argued that they would make it hard to distinguish the navigation lights of shipping and the signal lights on the shore. Eventually the electric lights were turned on at a reduced brilliance.

The Portway was numbered A36 when first opened. It was renumbered as a western extension of the A4 by the Ministry of Transport on 1 April 1935.

== Maintenance ==
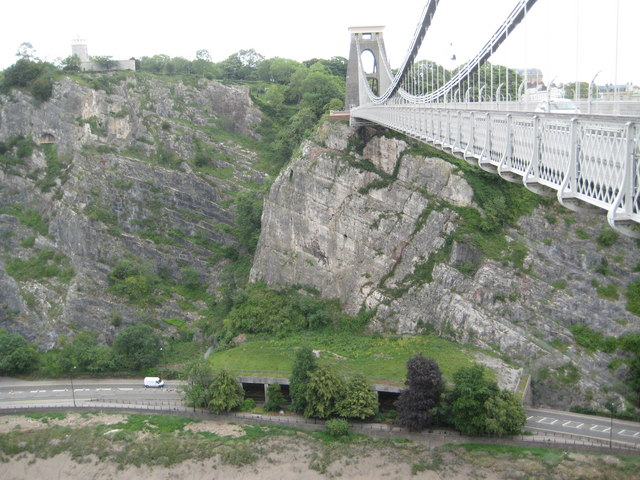
At the southern end of the Portway by the Clifton Suspension Bridge, a concrete canopy protects against falling rocks.

Traffic levels increased substantially on the Portway when the M5 motorway was extended past Cribbs Causeway to meet it in 1971, as it provided a convenient way of avoiding the congested road network around north-west Bristol. Although this was only intended to be a stopgap measure until the Avonmouth Bridge was completed, construction of the bridge was repeatedly delayed. Transport Minister Keith Speed proposed a temporary solution of signing all Midlands – South West traffic via the Portway, followed by either the A369 from Bristol to Portishead northbound, or local roads southbound. The scheme required minor upgrading to junctions along the Portway. The Avonmouth Bridge opened in May 1974, making the scheme redundant.

Rockfalls from the limestone cliffs of the Avon Gorge have caused a hazard to motorists on occasion and every year the road is closed to allow for inspection of the cliffs for potentially dangerous cracks and loose rocks, and to allow remedial works. In 1980, a glass fibre reinforced concrete canopy was constructed over the Portway close to where it passes below the Clifton Suspension Bridge, in order to protect traffic from such rock falls.

In 2001, a 27-inch (690 mm) water main burst near the junction with Bridge Valley Road, causing a major collapse and putting the road out of action for several months. One passer-by was swept into the river but was rescued uninjured.

== Other facilities ==
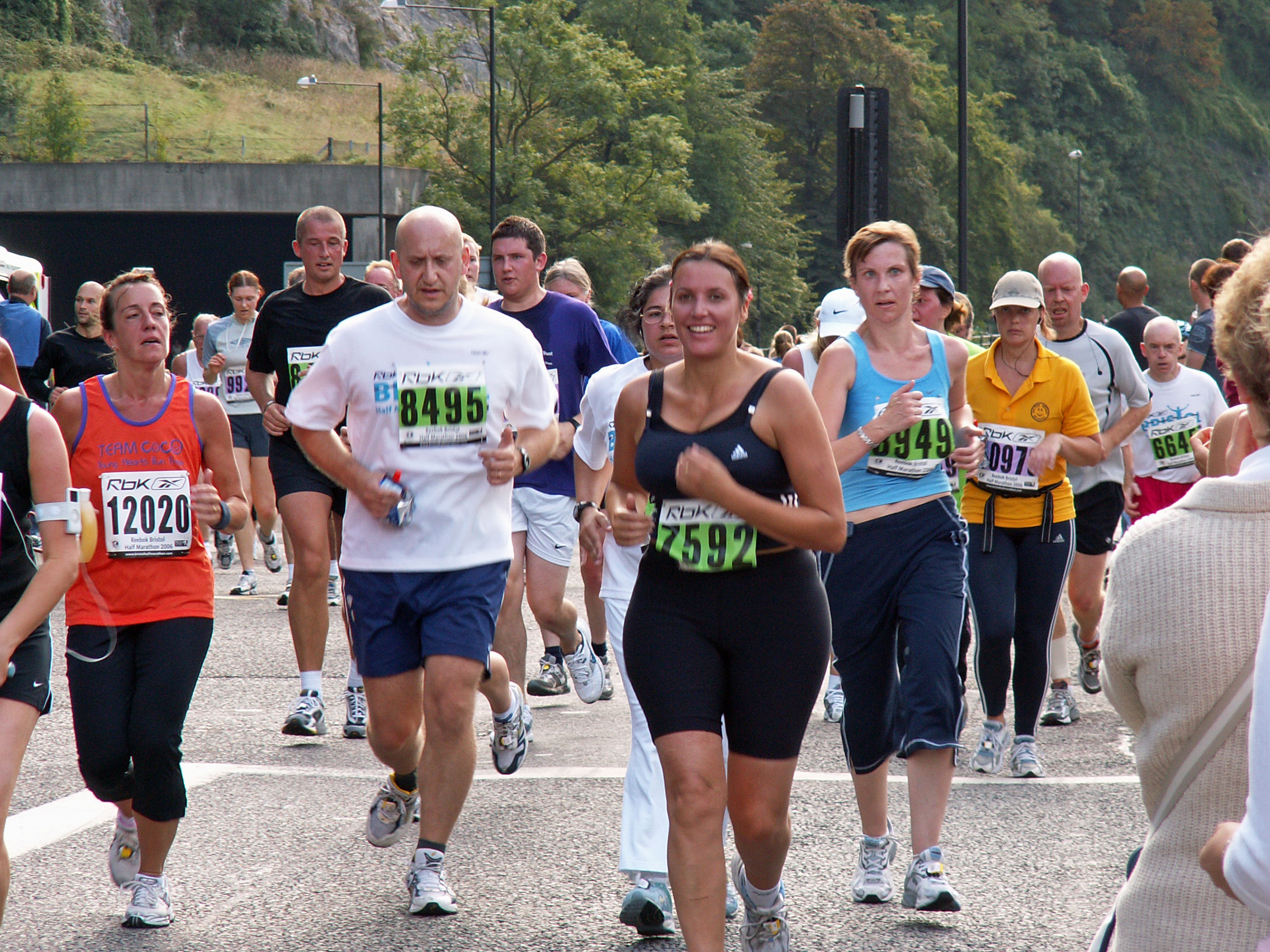
Fun runners on the Portway in the 2006 Bristol Half Marathon. The canopy over the road under the Clifton Suspension Bridge is visible in the background.

The Portway Park and Ride is in Shirehampton near the M5 junction. A bus lane on the inbound section of the road from Sea Mills is designed to allow quicker access for buses to the city centre. As well as Shirehampton and Sea Mills, a new station at the Park and Ride was proposed in 2009. It opened on 1 August 2023.

The Portway is regularly closed to through traffic in order to cater for other events besides routine maintenance. The annual Bristol Half Marathon in September uses the Portway as part of its route and the annual Bristol's Biggest Bike Ride also uses the road which is closed to motor traffic for the day. A series of Peaceful Portway festivals take place immediately after the sporting events while the road is still closed, allowing visitors to enjoy the scenery of the Avon Gorge without any traffic. In 2009, city councillor John Rogers proposed that the Portway be closed to motor traffic on summer Sundays to allow cycling in a car free environment. In 2015, the Portway was closed for five consecutive Sundays over May and June. The Mayor of Bristol, George Ferguson said the closure tied in with Big Green Week, an annual festival promoting eco-friendly activities around Bristol, where several events along the road were happening anyway.

== Incidents ==
In 2014, an anonymous group constructed an 8-foot-high (2.4 m) parody of the Hollywood Sign on the Avon Gorge next to the Portway, reading "Bristoland". The sign had a positive reception with commuters driving along the Portway. A few months later, the sign was briefly changed to "It's bland" without explanation, following which it was quickly removed.

== See also ==
- Portway Bristol F.C., a football team based at Shirehampton, near the road
- Oasis Academy Brightstowe, formerly Portway Community School located in Shirehampton
- Hotwells railway station, demolished during construction of the Portway
