= Clifton Extension Railway =

Joint railway in Bristol, England

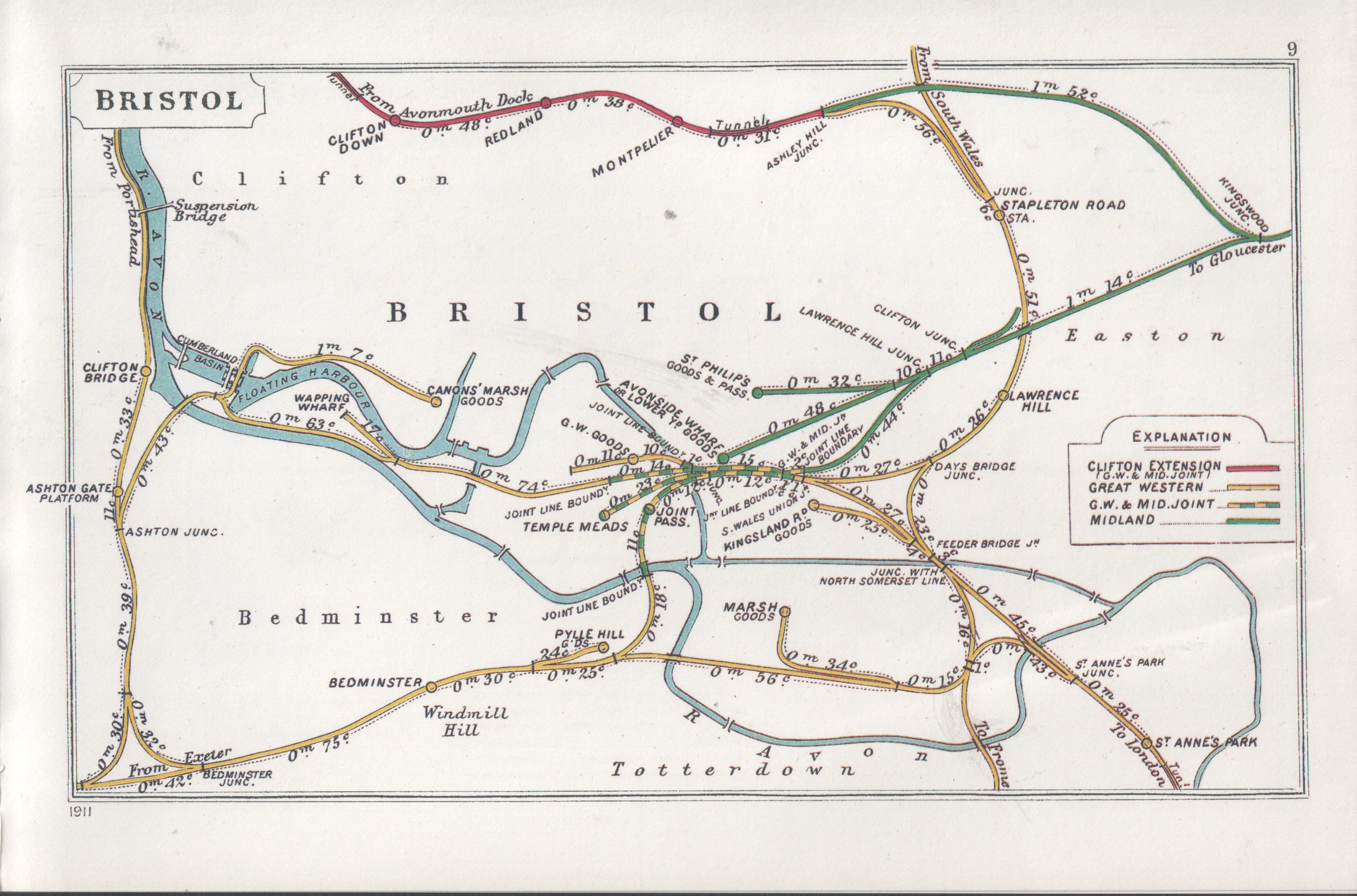
Clifton Extension Railway runs along the top of this 1911 Bristol railway map

The Clifton Extension Railway was a joint railway in Bristol, owned by the Great Western Railway (GWR) and the Midland Railway (MR) companies.

== Description of line ==
The railway ran from a junction with the GWR at Narroways Hill, just north of Stapleton Road railway station, to Avonmouth Docks. The branch was joined at Ashley Hill junction, just beyond Narroways Hill, by a line which left the Midland main line at Kingswood Junction, south-west of Fishponds station.

The first section of line through Montpelier to Clifton Down opened on 1 October 1874. The greatest engineering feature of the branch was a mile-long tunnel underneath Clifton Down. The section through the tunnel from Clifton Down station to Sneyd Park Junction, where it connected to the Bristol Port Railway, opened to goods traffic in 1877 and to passenger trains on 1 September 1885.

== Legal history ==
Great Western and Midland Railway Companies (Clifton and Bristol) Act 1871
- Act of Parliament
- Parliament of the United Kingdom
- Long title: An Act for transferring to the Great Western and the Midland Railway Companies the powers of the Bristol Port Railway and Pier Company with reference to a portion of their Clifton Extension, for authorising the construction of new junctions and the abandonment of authorised junctions near Bristol, for conferring powers of user of portions of the undertakings of the three Companies; and for other purposes.
- Citation: 34 & 35 Vict. c. xi

Dates
- Royal assent: 25 May 1871

Text of statute as originally enacted

Originally the railway was promoted by the Bristol Port Railway and Pier Company, incorporated under the Bristol Port, Railway and Pier Act 1862 of 17 June 1862. In 1871 the railway was transferred to the Great Western and Midland railway companies jointly, under the Great Western and Midland Railway Companies (Clifton and Bristol) Act 1871 (34 & 35 Vict. c. xi) of 25 May 1871, and the Midland Railway (Additional Powers) Act 1890 of 25 July 1890. The line was administered by the Clifton Extension Railway Joint Committee until 1894, and from then the Great Western and Midland Railways Joint Committee.

== Recent history ==
The line from Narroways Hill is now part of the Severn Beach Line.

The connection to the Midland Railway closed in 1965, and the thirteen arch viaduct over the River Frome valley was demolished in 1968.
