= Hotwells railway station =

Railway station in Bristol, England

Coordinates: 51°27′21″N 2°37′38″W

Hotwells, originally Clifton
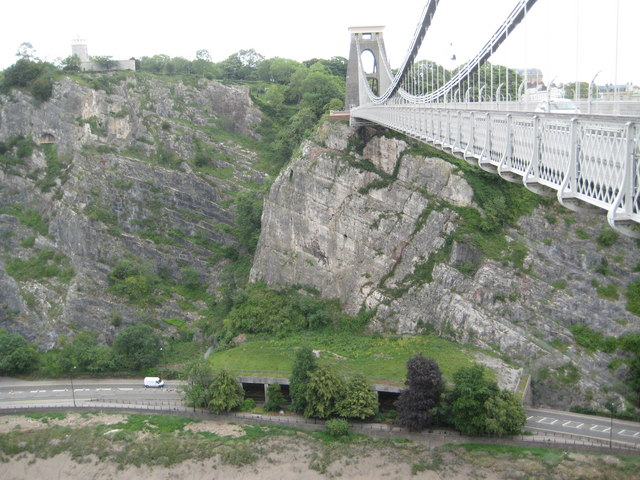
- The site of the station

General information
- Location: Hotwells, City of Bristol; England
- Platforms: 2

Other information
- Status: Disused

History
- Original company: Bristol Port Railway and Pier
- Pre-grouping: Great Western Railway

Key dates
- 6 March 1865: Opened
- 19 September 1921: Closed
Location

Hotwells station, Bristol

Hotwells railway station, was a railway station situated in the suburb of Hotwells in Bristol, England. It was the original southern terminus of the Bristol Port Railway and Pier which ran to a station and pier at Avonmouth. The station opened in 1865, originally named Clifton station, and was situated in the Avon Gorge almost underneath the Clifton Suspension Bridge, near the Clifton Rocks Railway, the Hotwells terminus of Bristol Tramways, the Rownham ferry and landing stages used by passenger steamers.

In 1871 the railway company was acquired by the Great Western Railway who created a tunnel under Clifton Down and linked the Port and Pier line to Bristol Temple Meads railway station. This left the Hotwells branch as a stub. The station remained open, renamed as Hotwells until 1921 when it and the track to Sneyd Park were removed to enable the building of the Portway road.

The only trace remaining today is a short tunnel under Bridge Valley Road which was used during the Second World War as an air raid shelter. Overcrowding became such a problem that Bristol City Council had to institute a permit system. In later years, until 1996 part of the tunnel was used by a local gun club as a short range.

Preceding station	Disused railways	Following station
Hotwells Halt; Line closed, Station closed	Great Western Railway; Bristol Port Railway and Pier	Terminus

== See also ==
- The Bristol Port Railway and Pier
- 1900 Ordnance Survey map showing Hotwells Station
- Photographs taken in old railway tunnel
- Hotwells
- Hotwells Halt railway station
