= Bristol Port Railway and Pier =

Railway line in Bristol, England

Coordinates: 51.4862°N 2.679°W

The Bristol Port Railway and Pier (also referred to as the Bristol Port and Pier Railway) was a railway in Bristol, England.

== Route ==
The Bristol Port Railway and Pier Company (BPRP) ran from a main terminus at Hotwells (originally called Clifton), northwards to west of Bristol city centre between the Clifton Suspension Bridge and Bridge Valley Road, to a terminus at Avonmouth. Upon leaving Hotwells, the line ran north alongside the River Avon through two tunnels, to a halt and passing point, then to Sneyd Park Junction, where the Clifton Extension Railway joined it. Continuing north following the river is the station at Sea Mills, then a bridge over the River Trym. The line curved west around Horse-Shoe Bend, then went slightly inland to Shirehampton, then turned back north-west. At Avonmouth Dock Junction the Extension Railway diverged north, and another line diverged west for freight, while the BPRP line continued into the station at Avonmouth Docks. Beyond there, the line diverged again, with one line going west to Avonmouth (Royal Edward) and another north to rejoin the Extension Railway. The main BPRP line continued on into its Avonmouth terminus.

== History ==
=== Formation ===
Bristol Port, Railway and Pier Act 1862
- Act of Parliament
- Parliament of the United Kingdom
- Long title: An Act for making a Railway from the Port of Bristol to the Old Channel at the Mouth of the River Avon, together with a Pier in the said River, and for other Purposes.
- Citation: 25 & 26 Vict. c. clix

Dates
- Royal assent: 17 July 1862

Text of statute as originally enacted

Bristol sits on the River Avon, with its docks several miles inland. By the 19th century, ships had grown to such a size that navigating the Avon was not possible any more, and they had to dock at the head of the river at Avonmouth instead. The Bristol Port Railway and Pier Company (BPRP) was founded in 1862 with the intent to build a single-track 4 ft 8 1/2 in (1,435 mm) standard gauge railway the 5.75 miles (9.25 km) from Avonmouth to the city centre, alongside the Avon. The railway's act of Parliament, the Bristol Port, Railway and Pier Act 1862 (25 & 26 Vict. c. clix), was passed on 17 July 1862, with Benjamin Burleigh appointed as engineer. It was the first standard gauge line in Bristol. The company's headquarters was at Shirehampton, where the first sod was turned by the Mayoress of Bristol, Mrs S. V. Hare, on 19 February 1863. The railway opened on 6 March 1865, although this was not announced in advance so that the line would not be overwhelmed by more people than the single locomotive could haul, and timetables were posted at Hotwells only minutes before the first departure.

=== Connection to the network ===
As built, the railway was isolated from the rest of the national network, having not been intended for anything more than local traffic. However, with very little goods traffic, a connection to the main line railways was needed to develop Avonmouth as a port. An extension from Hotwells to the city's main station at Temple Meads would have required crossing a large amount of developed land, and so was prohibitively expensive. Instead, a link was proposed from the BPRP at Sneyd Park, running under Clifton Down to join the Midland Railway and Bristol and South Wales Union Railway.

Bristol Port Railway and Pier (Clifton Extension) Act 1867
- Act of Parliament
- Parliament of the United Kingdom
- Long title: An Act to authorize the Bristol Port Railway and Pier Company to construct Railways for connecting their existing Railway with the Bristol and South Wales Union Railway and the Bristol and Birmingham Line of the Midland Railway; and for other Purposes.
- Citation: 30 & 31 Vict. c. cciv

Dates
- Royal assent: 15 August 1867

Text of statute as originally enacted

The connection was authorised by the Bristol Port Railway and Pier (Clifton Extension) Act 1867 (30 & 31 Vict. c. cciv), but the BPRP was in financial difficulties and unable to attract investors. Instead, the company joined forces with the Midland and Great Western Railways to build the Clifton Extension Railway, which opened in 1877 for freight to the newly built Avonmouth Docks. The double-track CER was not initially open to passengers, as although the Sneyd Park – Clifton Down section was certified for passenger use in 1878, the MR and GWR did not believe the BPRP line was in a suitable state to carry their passengers. The MR obtained powers in section 27 of the Midland Railway (Additional Powers) Act 1884 (47 & 48 Vict. c. xcviii) to install block signalling on the line at the BPRP's expense, and through trains eventually started on 1 September 1885.

The [Midland Railway] Company and the Great Western Railway Company or either of them may enter upon so much of the railway and works of the Bristol Port Railway and Pier Company as lies between Sneyd Park Junction and the termination of that railway at Avonmouth and may alter and reconstruct the signals thereon in such way as may be necessary to enable the said portion of railway to be worked on the block system And an annual sum equal to two per centum upon the amount of any costs and expenses incurred by the two Companies or either of them (but not exceeding six hundred pounds in the whole) in and about or incident to such alteration and reconstruction shall be paid by the Bristol Port Railway and Pier Company and may be recovered by the said two Companies or either of them accordingly in any court of competent jurisdiction. — Section 27, Midland Railway (Additional Powers) Act 1884 (47 & 48 Vict. c. xcviii)

=== Buyout and legacy ===
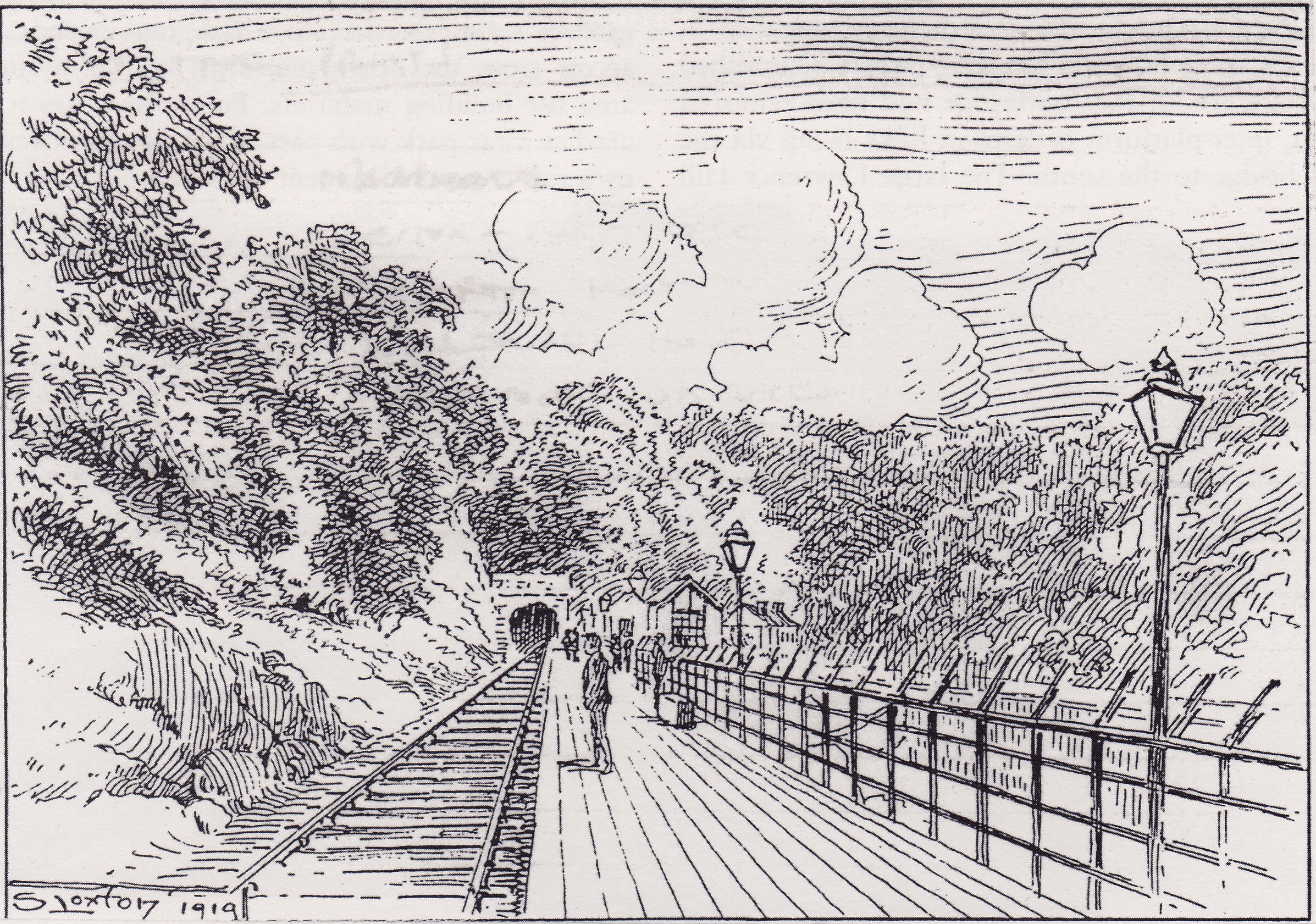
Hotwells Halt was built during the First World War.

On 25 July 1890, Parliament passed the Midland Railway (Additional Powers) Act 1890 (53 & 54 Vict. c. cxxxviii) which allowed the Midland and Great Western to buy out the BPRP, the BPRP effectively merging with the Clifton Extension Railway from 1 September that year.

Increased traffic led to the line being doubled from Avonmouth to Shirehampton in 1903, and to Sneyd Park in 1907. The Avonmouth terminus closed to passengers in 1902 to allow construction of the Royal Edward Dock, although workers' trains continued into 1903. Traffic on the Hotwells branch peaked in 1910 at ten trains per day and six on Sundays, and in 1917 Hotwells Halt was built to handle the large number of wartime munitions workers travelling to Avonmouth. The branch was closed in 1922 to make way for construction of the A4 Portway. The line from Sneyd Park Junction to Dock Junction and the stations of Shirehampton and Sea Mills survive as part of the Severn Beach Line.

Portnalls Number One Railway Tunnel, just north of Hotwells station, was used during the Second World War as an air-raid shelter by the people of Bristol. It became so popular that the City Council had to institute a pass system. The tunnel was once again used in the late twentieth century by the Bristol Gun Club, who converted a portion of it into a firing range. However, this ended following the passage of the Firearms (Amendment) (No. 2) Act 1997 which banned handguns in the United Kingdom, and the tunnel was once more abandoned. It is currently split in three parts – the firing range, a section of original tunnel, and the shelter.

In the 2000s subsidence and movement in the Number Two tunnel affected the road above, Bridge Valley Road, which required major stabilization work and the waterproof tanking of the tunnel, to enable the road to be reopened.

== Services ==
Initial service from March 1865 was six trains per day in each direction, with four down (Hotwells to Avonmouth) and five up (Avonmouth to Hotwells) on Sundays, taking around 30 minutes for the 5.75 miles (9.25 km) trip. On weekdays the quickest was 26 minutes, and 20 minutes on Sundays as Shirehampton was closed due to objections from the local church, although this concession was reversed by May that year. The fare for a single between Hotwells and Avonmouth was 1s 0d, 9d and 6d for first, second and third class respectively, with returns 6d more.

By January 1866 the service was reduced to three down and four up per day, with one Shirehampton-Avonmouth except on Sundays; this increased to five up and down in April that year, with one Hotwells-Shirehampton except on Sundays. By June the service was five up and down on Sundays, and six on other days. Two extra trains per day were laid on when Avonmouth Docks was opened, and by summer 1887 there were ten up and down, with four each way and an Avonmouth-Shirehampton return on Sundays.

By 1910 Avonmouth was no longer a resort, but instead a workplace, and so Sunday service was reduced to two trains each way, taking 19 minutes each. The Sunday service had been completely discontinued by 1920, with weekday service reduced to nine down and eight up, with journey times of 18 minutes, and the first two morning departures forsaking the Hotwells terminus for Hotwells Halt's longer platform. From September 1921, the Halt was the terminus of the BPRP line, as the Hotwells terminus was closed to allow construction of the A4 Portway. Hotwells Halt, and the line to Sneyd Park Junction, closed on 3 July 1922, with the final train running on 1 July.

According to some sources, the trains were not operated by the BPRP itself, but instead were operated under a lease agreement by the Bristol and Exeter Railway. This lease was taken over by the Great Western Railway in 1871, along with the rest of the Bristol and Exeter.

== Rolling stock ==
The BPRP had two 0-4-2 side tank locomotives, possibly from the St Helens Railway. Coaching stock was four-wheeled; there were initially 14 carriages, rising to around 20 according to some reports, all of which were disposed of when the line was taken over. The BPRP also possessed two covered and two uncovered wagons, in a light grey livery. The coaching stock was painted yellow and white, with some later painted dark chocolate.

== See also ==
- Rail transport in Bristol
