= Goram and Vincent =

Giants in Bristol folklore

Goram and Vincent (or Ghyston) are legendary giants in the folklore of the Bristol area, UK.

== Summary ==
The earliest accounts of the story explain the ascendancy of Bristol over the port of Sea Mills (the earlier Roman settlement Portus Abonae). It also belongs to the genus of myths which explain the origin of local geographical features by supernatural activity, and trade on existing place-names to do so. Such myths are often also the basis for other new names. The most widespread version of the legend relates that two local giants, Goram and Vincent – who, according to one version, were brothers – fancied the same woman, the beautiful Avona (whose name is that of the major local river, the River Avon in Latin). She was open-minded about her suitors, and offered herself to whichever of them could drain the lake which supposedly once occupied the space between Bradford-on-Avon (Wiltshire) and Bristol. They chose different routes through the limestone hills for their drainage channels. Goram opted for a route through Henbury, and Vincent chose one on the south side of Clifton.

Unfortunately for Goram, he overheated while hard at work, drank a giant quantity of ale, and fell asleep in his favourite stone chair, whilst Vincent paced himself better and completed his channel. (One version depicts Goram as lazy and Vincent as keen and industrious.) The story accounts for the narrow gorge of the Hazel Brook (a tributary of the river Trym) in Henbury and the Avon Gorge through which the Avon now flows.

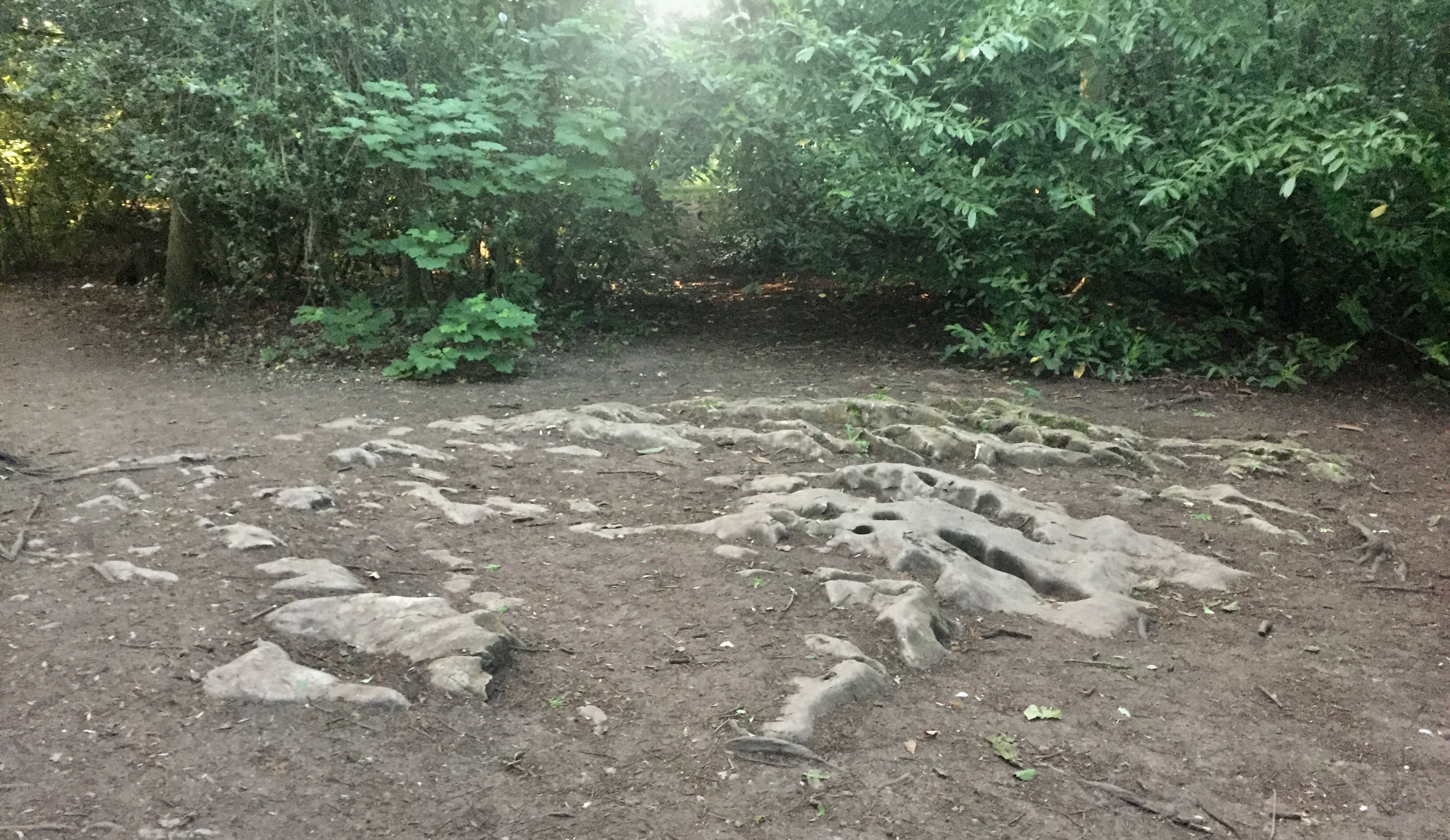
The legend says that the Giant's Footprint formation in the Blaise Estate was caused by Goram stamping his foot after discovering that he had lost Avona's challenge.

The legend also provides a basis for explaining the existence of other geographical features. When Goram woke up, he was distraught at losing Avona's affections. He first stamped his foot in a pit, creating The Giant's Footprint in the woods above Henbury gorge, and then drowned himself in the Severn. The two islands in the Severn estuary, Steep Holm and Flat Holm, are his head and shoulder. Goram also has his Soap-Dish, which is a short pillar capped with earth, and a pool also in the Henbury gorge.

== Early accounts ==
The oldest known mention of the giants was by William Worcester, who in 1480 described Ghyston Cliff (now St. Vincent's Rocks, near Clifton Observatory), and said that the hillfort above it (Clifton Down Camp) was founded "by a certain giant called Ghyst", who was "portrayed in/on the ground" (in terra portraiatum), presumably as a hill figure.

An early version of the legend itself was recorded by John Aubrey in his Monumenta Britannica (c. 1663–1693):

The Tradition concerning St. Vincent's Rocks is, that there were three Brothers, viz. Vincent, Goram, and the Smyth of Dunderhill: and that there was a Controversy between Gorram and Vincent about this Work: for Goram would have had the Haven to have been at Henbury. (Gorham lived at Henbury, where they still shew Gorham's chaire, and Gorham's Oven.) but at last the two Brothers agreed, and brake the Rock; and when they wore out their Sledges, they threw them to Dunderhill (two miles off) to their Brother to be mended. Perhaps some sparke of Truth might be pick't out in this Mist.

Another version is given in Robert Atkyns' The Ancient and Present State of Glostershire (1712):

Before the Port of Bristol was settled in Frome River, there seems to have been a Dispute whether a Place called Say-Mills was not as convenient a Port as the other; several Men of War and other large Ships having been built in that Place. This occasioned the extravagant fabulous Story, concerning St. Vincent the Spanish Bishop, and Goram a private Hermit. The Story makes these to have been mighty Gyants, and that they contended which way the Rivers Avon and Frome should vent themselves into the Severn: If the Port of Say-Mills had been judged more convenient, then Goram had prevailed; because his Hermitage was in Westbury, on the side of the Brook Trim, which runs down to Say-Mills: But the Port of Frome being thought more advantageous, therefore the Miracle relates that St. Vincent did cleave St. Vincent's Rocks asunder, and so gave Passage to the Rivers, because those Rocks derive their Name from a Chapel dedicated to St. Vincent.

== Other variants ==
In another version of the myth, Goram dug the Avon Gorge himself and there is no sign of Vincent in the story. Having completed the job, he carelessly fell over a barrow called Maes Knoll, on Dundry Hill south of Bristol, and plunged into the Severn estuary, as above. In yet another, Vincent and Goram shared a pickaxe as they went about their labours, and Vincent accidentally killed Goram by throwing it to him inaccurately halfway through their respective jobs. Vincent finished the Avon Gorge out of remorse and did some other major construction work like the Stanton Drew stone circles and even Stonehenge.

The story has also been adapted to other local circumstances. The early 19th-century cleric and folklorist Rev. John Skinner collected a tale from the area that is now called Druid Stoke from a local farmer. Two giants had thrown stones at each other, one standing at Henbury, the other at St Vincent's Rocks by the Avon Gorge. The Henbury giant, called Goram or Gorm, threw a large one at his rival, but it fell short of its target; this accounts for the capstone of a formerly visible megalithic monument at Druid Stoke.

One or the other giant is said to have created Maes Knoll hillfort and the pre-Anglo-Saxon period linear earthwork Wansdyke, south-east of Bristol, more or less accidentally with his digging tools.

== Names ==
The name Vincent for one of the giants rests on the fact that at Clifton, at the narrowest point of the Avon Gorge, there was formerly an ancient hermitage and chapel dedicated to St Vincent, at or near the present cave in the cliff-face which bears his name. Another (apparently modern) version of the story calls the Clifton giant Ghyston, which is in fact the name, of obscure origin, for the whole of the cliff-face of the Avon Gorge at least as early as the mid-fifteenth century, in the detailed description of the Bristol area by William Worcester. The place-name was personified to produce the giant's name. Vincent's Cave is called Ghyston cave or The Giant’s Hole in an article in the July 1837 issue of Felix Farley’s Bristol Journal.

Goram's name may have been borrowed from Iseult's father, the king of Ireland in early versions of the romance of Tristan and Iseult, which might suggest that the legend arose sometime after 1200. Gorm is Irish for 'blue' or 'dark-skinned'. The Christian name Vincent is first found in England in the 13th century, suggesting a fashionable cult of the saint (St Vincent the Deacon) around that time. These two factors suggest a possible 13th-century origin for the Bristol legend, but that is completely uncertain. It is not known, for example, whether the Clifton hermit was himself called Vincent and later became associated with the saint. St Vincent might also have been known in Bristol relatively early through the city's wine trade with Portugal and Spain (he was born in Huesca, lived and worked in Zaragoza, and is patron saint of Lisbon and of vintners).

== Modern times ==
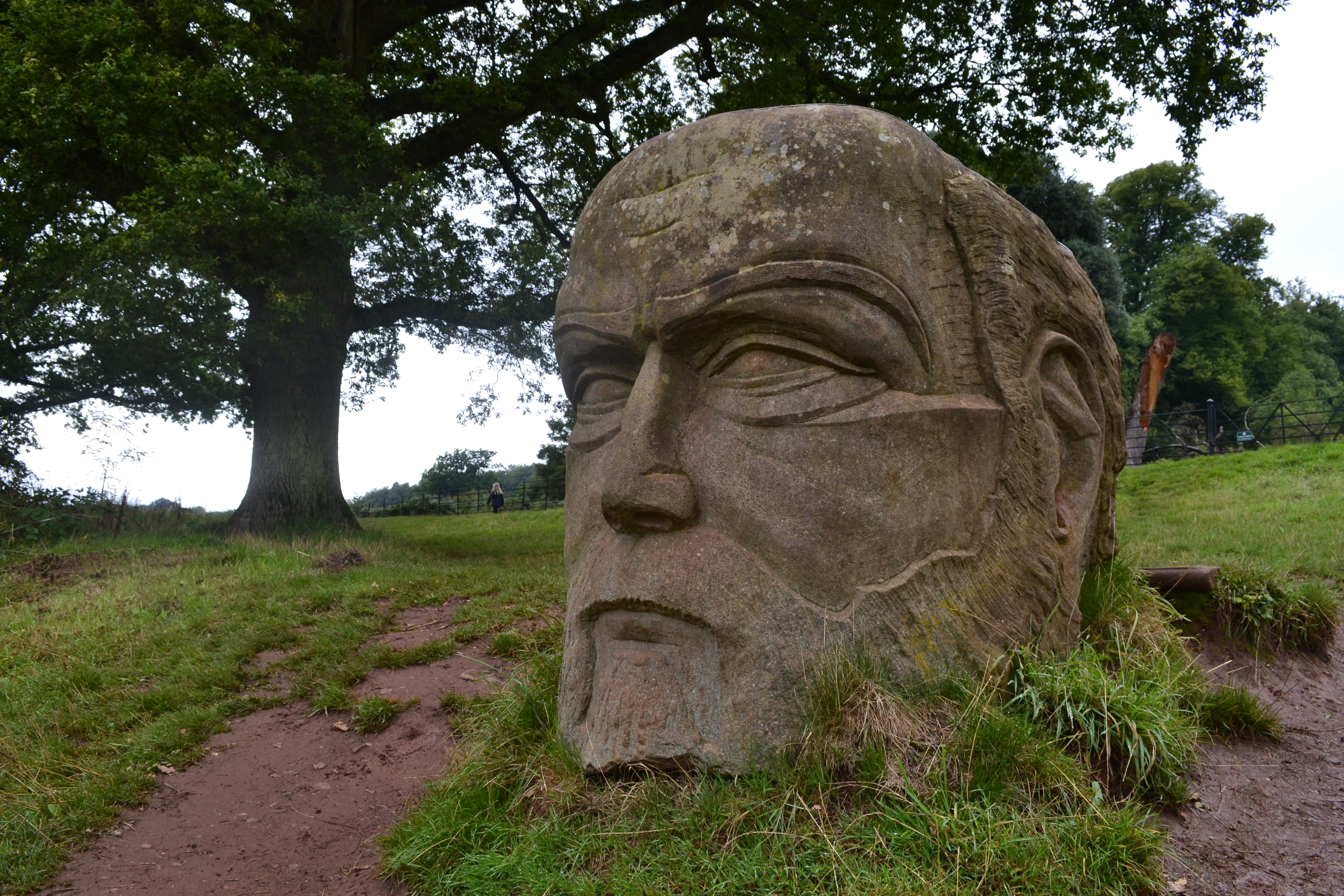
Sculpture of Goram the Giant in the grounds of Ashton Court

Goram is commemorated in the features Goram's Chair and Footprint (some versions seem to treat these as the same thing, saying that the Chair was formed by the giant stamping his foot) and Soap-Dish in the gorge of the Hazel Brook. A pub of the early 1960s on the Lawrence Weston housing estate in west Bristol is called The Giant Goram, and from about 1954 sporadically to 1996, there was a funfair bearing Goram's name on the Blaise Castle landed estate (by then in the hands of Bristol City Council) in Henbury.

Marc Vyvyan-Jones, with help from Roland Clare and Linda Clare, wrote (on Plough Monday 1993) a mumming-style play based on the legend. This was first performed by Rag Morris at Blaise Castle, Bristol on Saturday 20 March 1993.

Local brewers, Butcombe, have celebrated Goram in the 2020s by naming both a full strength and an alcohol free IPA after him.
