= Kingsweston =

Suburb of Bristol, England

Coordinates: 51.494°N 2.658°W

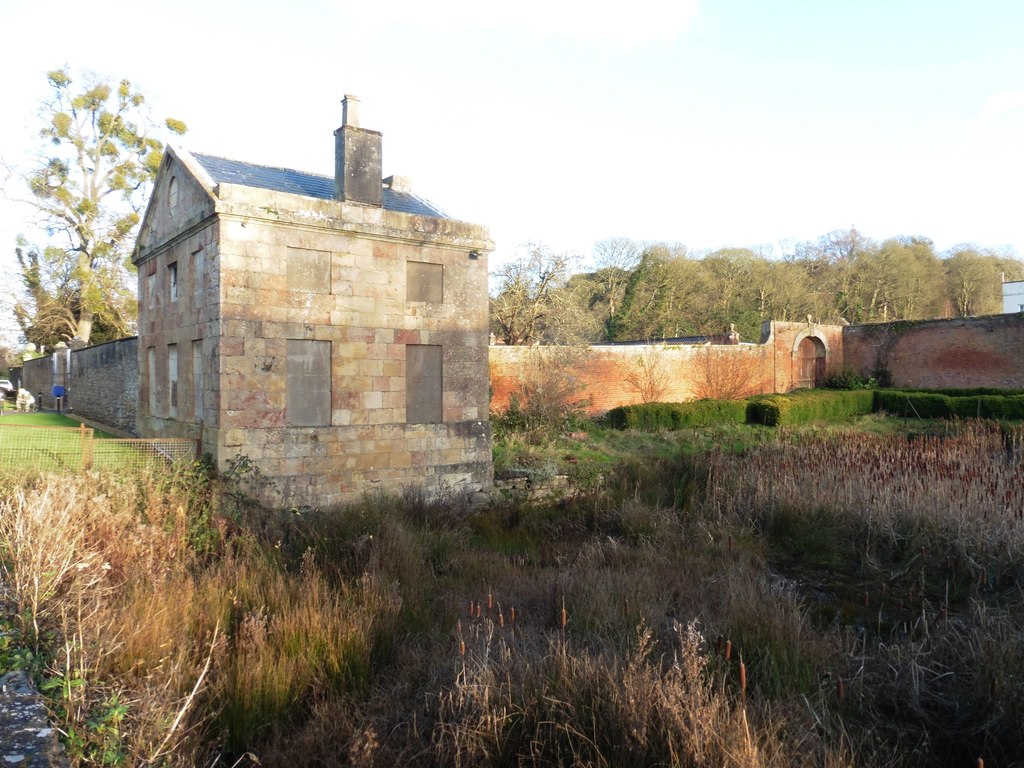

- Location within Bristol
- OS grid reference: ST543774
- Unitary authority: Bristol
- Ceremonial county: Bristol
- Region: South West
- Country: England
- Sovereign state: United Kingdom
- Post town: BRISTOL
- Postcode district: BS9
- Dialling code: 0117
- Police: Avon and Somerset
- Fire: Avon
- Ambulance: South Western
- UK Parliament: Bristol North West

Kingsweston or Kings Weston is a suburban neighbourhood in the city of Bristol, England. It is located in the northwest of the city, in the Avonmouth and Lawrence Weston electoral ward and the Bristol North West parliamentary constituency. The neighbourhood consists of a cluster of estate buildings and other houses on Kingsweston Hill, adjacent to Kings Weston House. The neighbourhood has a small village character, being separated from the surrounding built-up area by parkland remnants of the Kings Weston House estate.

Kingsweston was also the name of one of Bristol's electoral wards from 1980 to 2016, covering an area including Kingsweston itself and several neighbouring suburbs.

== History ==
Kings Weston, or Weston Regis, was originally a hamlet (or tything) in the parish of Henbury, to the west of Lawrence Weston, subsumed into Lawrence Weston when the estate was built in the 1940s. It is the location of Kings Weston House. The village also gave its name to Kingsweston Hill and Kings Weston Lane, the main road between Lawrence Weston and Shirehampton.

There is a Roman villa at Kings Weston.

== Electoral ward ==
Kingsweston
- Former ward Bristol City Council
- Ward boundaries until 2016.

1980–2016
- Replaced by: Avonmouth and Lawrence Weston, Stoke Bishop

Kingsweston was created as an electoral ward in 1980, initially electing one member to Avon County Council and two members to Bristol City Council. The ward was abolished following a Local Government Boundary Commission review in 2015, with much of the area moving into the new Avonmouth and Lawrence Weston ward, and some joining Stoke Bishop ward.

In addition to Kingsweston itself, the ward contained some or all parts of the neighbourhoods of Coombe Dingle, Lawrence Weston and Sea Mills. At the 2001 Census there were 10,844 people living in Kingsweston ward, over 95% of whom were white.

Before 2016, Bristol City Council used a system of elections by thirds, in which councillors sat for four year terms but elections took place in three out of every four years, with roughly one third of seats up for election at any one time. Kingsweston ward therefore elected one of its two councillors at a time, in elections taking place two years in every four.

Councillors representing Kingsweston ward before 2016
Election	Councillor	Party
2014	Tim Leaman	Liberal Democrats
2013	Jason Budd	Independents for Bristol
2010	Tim Leaman	Liberal Democrats
2009	Simon Rayner	Liberal Democrats
2006	John Thomas Bees	Labour
2005	Judith Margaret Price	Labour
2002	John Thomas Bees	Labour
2001	Judith Margaret Price	Labour

== See also ==
- Districts of Bristol
- Public transport in Bristol
