= A4018 road =

Road in Bristol

A4018

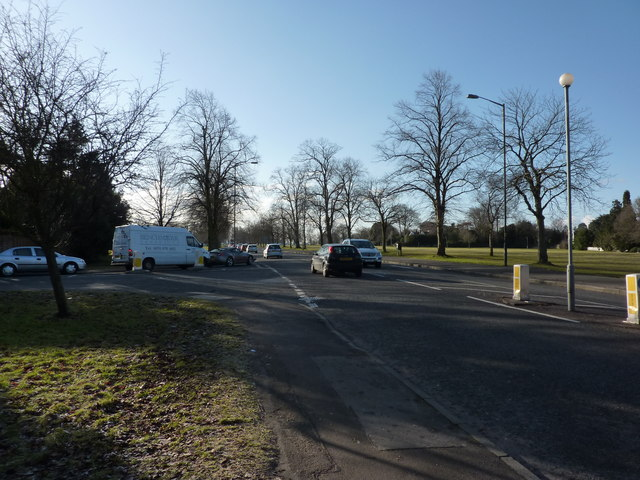
- A4018 Westbury Road at Durdham Down

Route information
- Length: 6.1 mi (9.8 km)

Major junctions
- North end: Cribbs Causeway - M5 Junction 17
- J17→M5 motorway A4162 A4176; A38; A4
- South end: Bristol city centre

Location
- Country: United Kingdom
- Constituent country: England
- Primary destinations: Bristol

Road network
- Roads in the United Kingdom; Motorways; A and B road zones
← A4017	→ A4019

The A4018 is an A-road connecting the city centre of Bristol to the M5 motorway at Cribbs Causeway. It is one of the four principal roads which link central Bristol to the motorway network (the others being the M32 motorway, the A38 and the Portway).

== Route ==
The A4018 runs for 6.1 miles (9.8 km), starting at a junction with the A4 and A38 at The Centre, and finishing at junction 17 of the M5 motorway at Cribbs Causeway. The route includes Park Street and Whiteladies Road. It then passes over part of Durdham Down on Westbury Road, then along Falcondale Road and Passage Road through Westbury-on-Trym and Brentry. The final part of the A4018 is Cribbs Causeway, near Catbrain. Part of the road forms the boundary for the Westbury-on-Trym electoral ward in Bristol.

== History ==
The original route of the A4018 went from Bristol to Avonmouth via Durdham Down and Shirehampton Road, the main road between Bristol and Avonmouth before the Portway was opened in 1926. By the 1940s only the route from the centre of Bristol to Durdham Down was designated the A4018, and the remainder of the route had been redesignated the B4054. In 1959 Passage Road was widened and rebuilt, and by 1962 the route of the A4018 was extended from Durdham Down to Cribbs Causeway along the former route of the B4055 (Westbury Road), unclassified roads (Falcondale Road and Passage Road) and a further part of the B4055 (Cribbs Causeway), linking with the New Filton Bypass which ran from Cribbs Causeway to the A38 north of Patchway. In December 1971 the New Filton Bypass was incorporated into the M5 motorway, and the A4018, by then dualled from Cribbs Causeway to Westbury-on-Trym, became the principal road linking the motorway to west Bristol.

== Places of interest ==
Sites close to the route of the road include Blaise Castle, an Iron Age hill fortification.
