= Lawrence Weston, Bristol =

Housing estate in Bristol, England

Coordinates: 51°30′07″N 2°39′32″W

Lawrence Weston
- Location within Bristol
- Population: 10,947
- OS grid reference: ST541781
- Unitary authority: Bristol
- Ceremonial county: Bristol
- Region: South West
- Country: England
- Sovereign state: United Kingdom
- Post town: BRISTOL
- Postcode district: BS11
- Dialling code: 0117
- Police: Avon and Somerset
- Fire: Avon
- Ambulance: South Western
- UK Parliament: Bristol North West

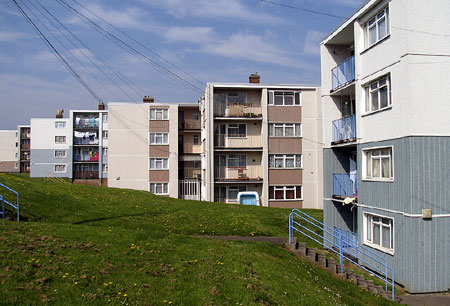
Council-owned flats in Long Cross, Lawrence Weston

Lawrence Weston is a post-war housing estate in northwest Bristol, England, between Henbury and Shirehampton. The estate is bounded in the east by the Blaise Castle estate and woods. It is at the edge of the River Severn's flood plain, directly beneath the wooded Kingsweston Hill. The industrial complex and port of Avonmouth is a mile or so west, across the flood plain. Lawrence Weston forms part of the electoral ward of Avonmouth and Lawrence Weston.

Lawrence Weston was originally a hamlet, a tything of the parish of Henbury. It was transformed in the late 1940s and early 1950s, when the estate was built, absorbing both the original hamlet and the neighbouring hamlet of Kings Weston. Originally council-owned, much of the housing stock is now in private hands.

There are two youth centres, a BMX track, a young people's shop called Juicy Blitz and a Youth Inclusion project. It has a community farm and a range of clubs and groups for young people. The community also owns the Lawrence Weston Wind Turbine through the Ambition Lawrence Weston charity organisation. The turbine, built in Avonmouth near the Severn Estuary in 2023, generates energy which is then bought by the National Grid, with the surplus revenue then used for community projects and events.

Kings Weston House and Kings Weston Roman Villa both lie near the western end of the estate.

== Lawrence Weston Moor ==
Lawrence Weston Moor is an 11.9 hectare local nature reserve leased from Bristol City Council and managed by the Avon Wildlife Trust. The drier fields are hay meadows where plants such as meadowsweet and pepper-saxifrage are common. The wetter meadows have ragged robin, marsh marigold and creeping forget-me-not. The fields and old pollarded willows support birds such as reed buntings, snipe, reed and sedge warblers, little owls and kestrels. The rhynes (drainage ditches) are rich in water plants and provide homes for common frogs and many insects, such as dragonflies.

== See also ==
- Kingsweston
