= Cribbs Causeway =

Large out-of-town shopping centre, just outside of Bristol, UK

Coordinates: 51°31′30″N 2°35′46″W

Cribbs Causeway refers to both a road in South Gloucestershire, England, running north of the city of Bristol, and the adjacent area which is notable for its out-of-town shopping centres and leisure facilities. The retail and leisure complex takes its name from the road, and includes retail parks, supermarkets, an enclosed shopping centre known as Cribbs, an ice rink, a Vue cinema, a ten-pin bowling venue (Hollywood Bowl) and a gym.

The Cribbs Causeway road is a historic route, as it follows a section of a Roman road from Sea Mills to South Gloucestershire, part of a longer Roman route from Gloucester to the south-west of England. The modern road of that name is situated north of Bristol, and west of the town of Patchway, in the civil parish of Almondsbury. It runs approximately north-east from the northern edge of Bristol at Henbury, to a point just beyond the M5 motorway (at junction 17), and forms parts of today's A4018 and B4055 roads. It is one of the primary access routes from Bristol to the Cribbs Causeway retail and leisure complex; other primary access routes being the M5 motorway itself, and the Hayes Way link to the A38.

The Hazel Brook rises at Cribbs Causeway, flowing southwards through Blaise Castle Estate, before joining the River Trym.

== History ==
Cribbs Causeway is believed to be the route of a Roman road from Sea Mills to Gloucester, part of a longer Roman route from Gloucester to the south-west of England. It later became the route of a turnpike from Bristol to New Passage. In the 20th century it was part of the main road from Bristol to the Aust Ferry, until the Severn Bridge opened in 1966. In the early 1960s it was upgraded to an A road (the A4018), and linked with the New Filton Bypass to the A38 north of Patchway. In 1971 the New Filton Bypass was incorporated into the M5 motorway, and the motorway junction transformed the area. In 1976 Carrefour was granted planning permission to build a hypermarket (now the Asda store) near the junction. Development of retail parks followed, and in 1998 the mall was opened.

The road has been said to owe its name to Tom Cribb, a bare-knuckle boxer from the Bristol area. However, this was proven wrong in the 1960s with the discovery of a map showing the current name, published in 1777: four years before the boxer was born. The book's author goes on to speculate that the true origin of the name may be from Crybe's dwelling (Crybe being a personal name), or from crib—a manger or hovel. But all that we can truly glean from this is that the causeway—the Roman road—was named for a family with the surname Cribb (which may or may not have been closely related to the boxer's family: he was from Hanham on the opposite side of Bristol). This local family was probably also commemorated in the smallholding called Crybescroft which existed in Henbury in 1281.

== Shopping and leisure ==
=== Cribbs ===
Cribbs
- Location: Patchway, UK
- Opened: 31 March 1998; 28 years ago
- Owner: M&G Real Estate
- Num. of stores: 135
- Num. of anchor tenants: 2
- Floor area: 994,981 sq ft (92,436.8 m^{2})
- Floors: 2
- Website: www.mallcribbs.com

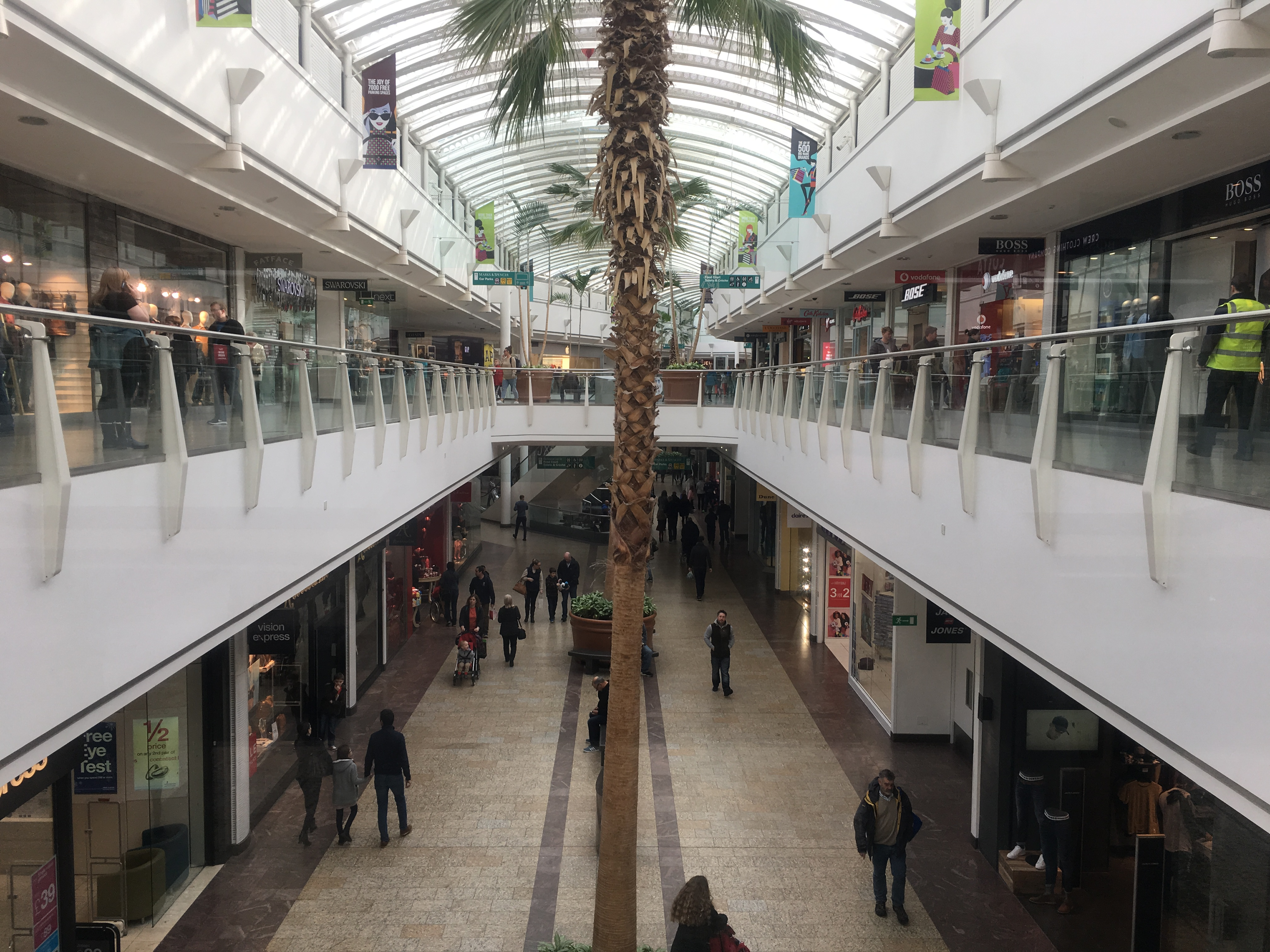
Cribbs

Cribbs (formerly known as The Mall at Cribbs Causeway) comprises 130 shops on two levels, although some of the large stores occupy more levels. Major stores include anchor-tenants John Lewis and Partners and Marks & Spencer, plus Boots, H&M, Next, River Island. During 2013, the centre housed the Gromit Unleashed Exhibition and Store and also hosted the charity auction that took place after the arts trial had concluded. Global corporations can also be found in Cribbs and include retailers such as Apple and Polestar. The food court is located on the upper level and is home to various chain outlets such as: Burger King, Chopstix, Pizza Hut, Nando's, Krispy Kreme and others.

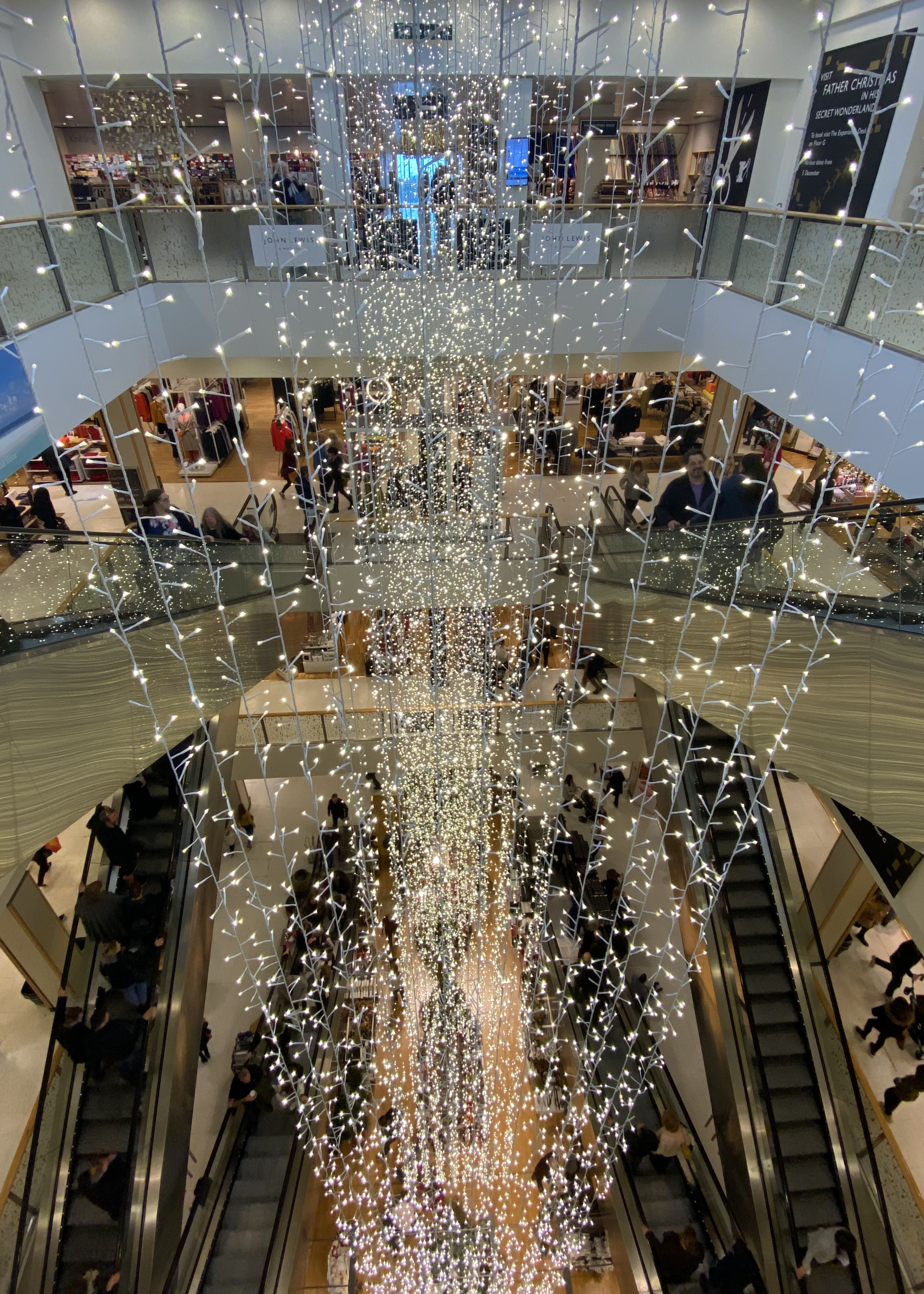
The John Lewis anchor store's central atrium spanning four levels at Christmas 2019, decorated with twinkling warm white LED lights—the lights are installed by professionals using climbing equipment.

At its centre point, Cribbs has a large fountain with a water display. Money thrown into the fountain is donated to local charities, the company reports it raises in excess of £10,000 a year for local charities. The fountain has many copper pipes that pump water out in repeated patterns and either into the middle, or towards the middle, where another pipe shoots water high into the air every 5–10 minutes at approximately 10–15 metres (35–50 ft). The height of the water jet is adjustable to prevent any object, hanging from above, from getting wet; additionally there are also a few other decorative fountains outside the main entrance.

To celebrate the mall's tenth anniversary, the company announced a £5 million refurbishment of the food court, completed in two stages with completion in May 2009.

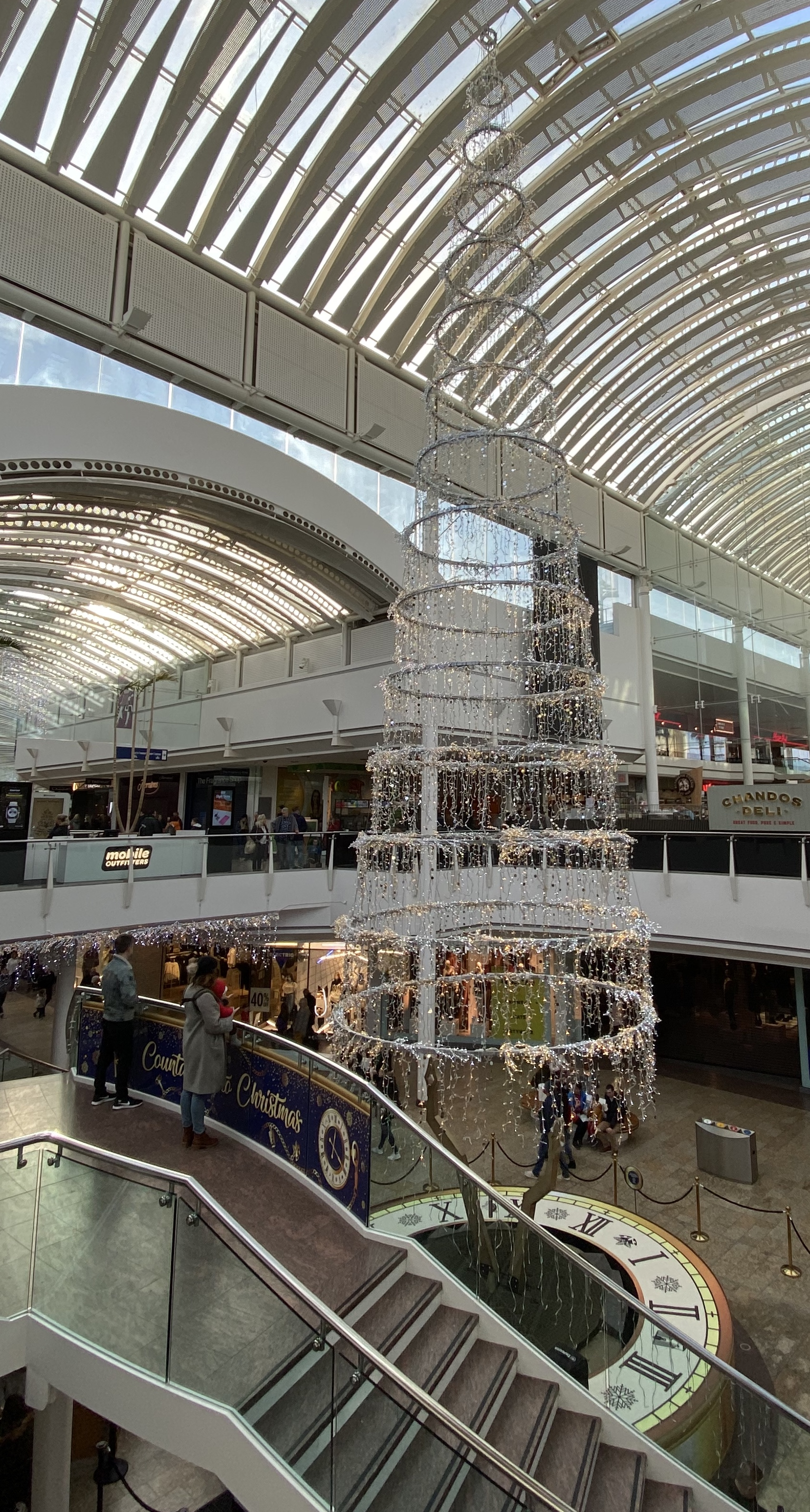
The mall has been known to cover the central fountain in the main shopping concourse for special occasions, as seen here for Christmas with a platform representing a clock face and Christmas tree. Other notable occasions have been anniversaries of the mall where the fountain has been covered in boarding representing a birthday cake.

As of 2018, Cribbs is owned by M&G Real Estate.

The primary access routes are the M5 Junction 17, Hayes Way to the A38 and A4018. The mall is one of the major shopping centres in the Bristol area, the others being Broadmead (the location of The Galleries, Bristol) and Cabot Circus.

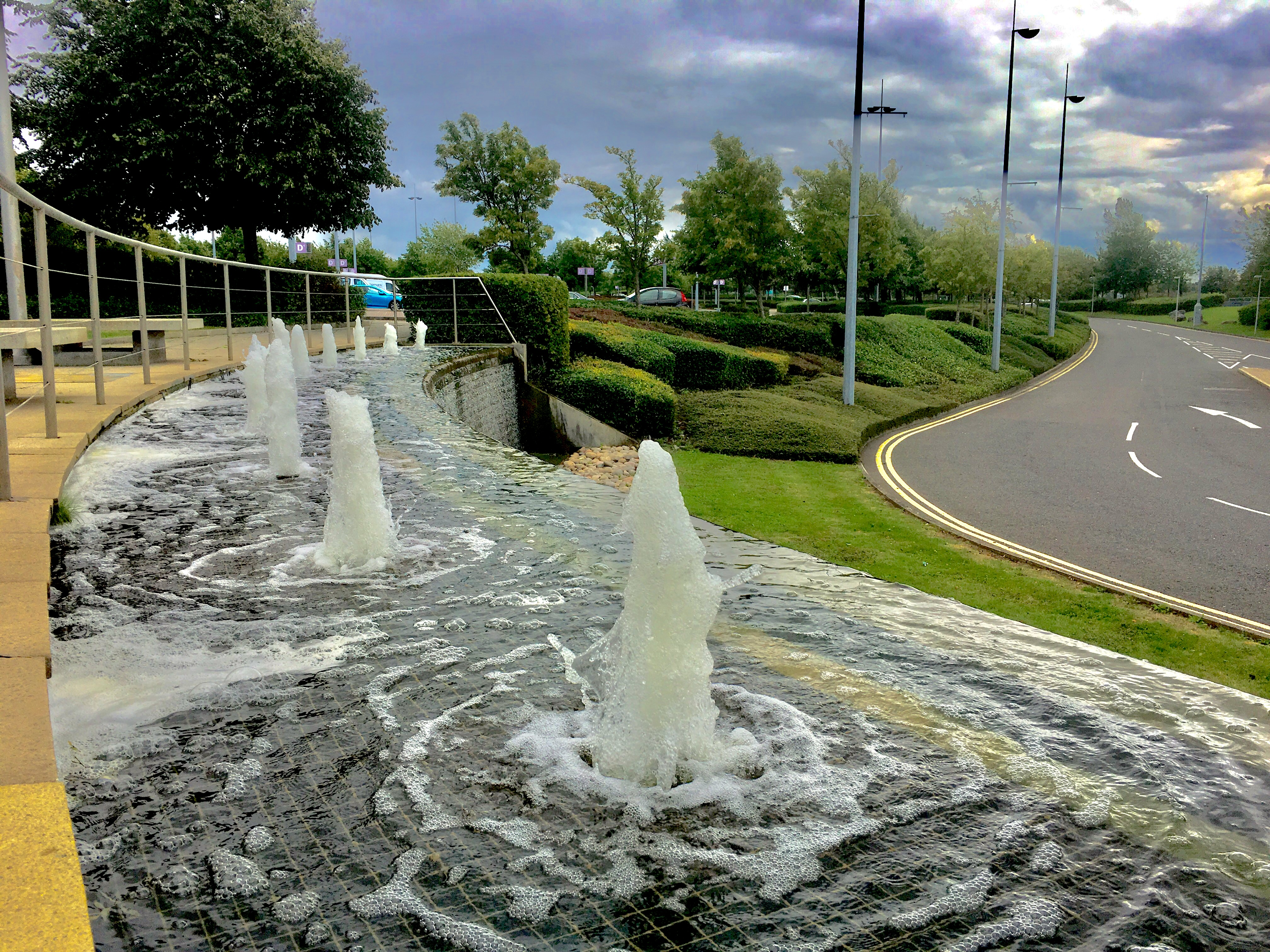
A foam fountain at the mall

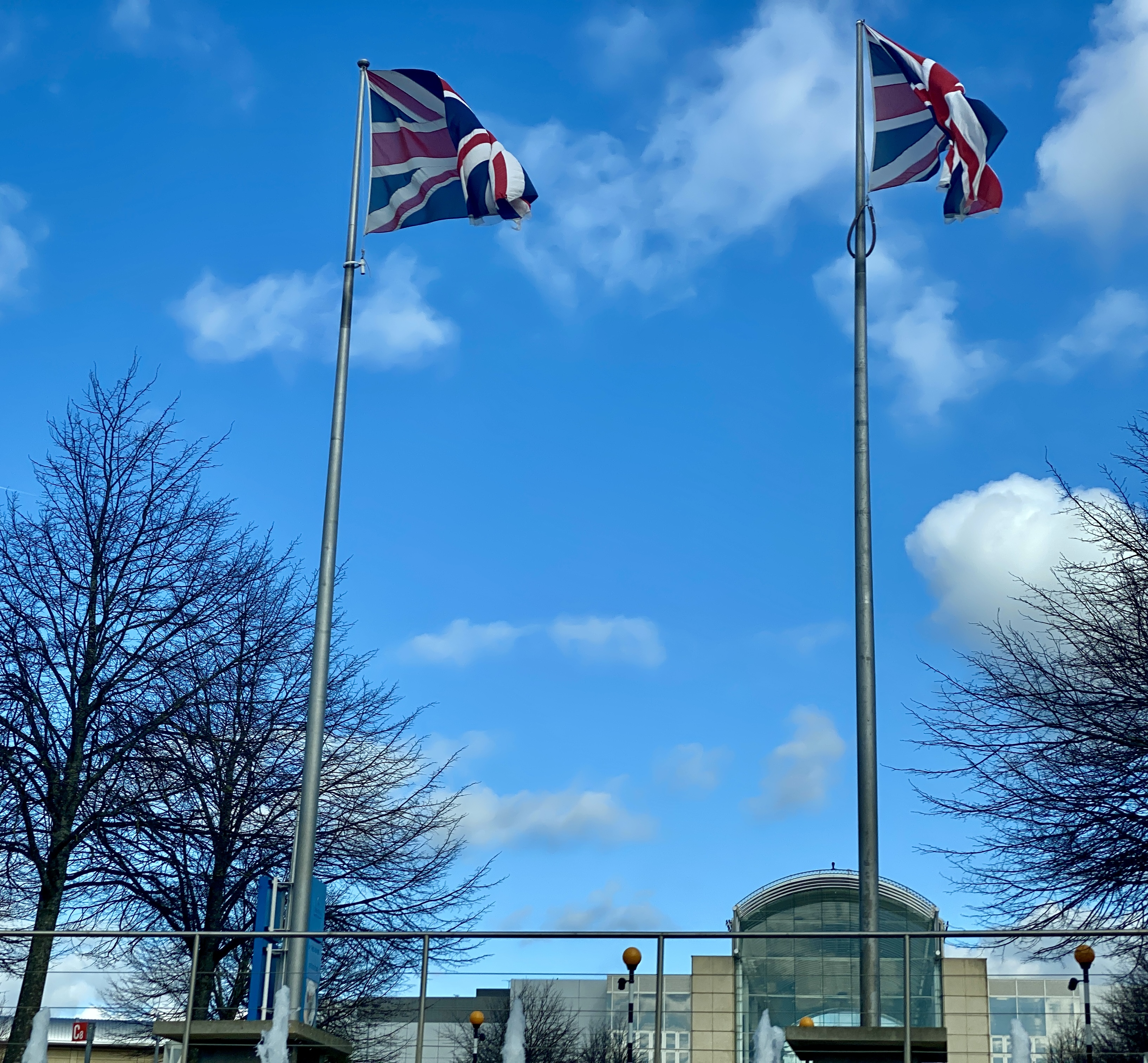
Union Flags on display in 2022 in front of the mall's main entrance

=== Stores ===
- M&S
- H&M
- Boots
- TGJones
- John Lewis and Partners
- New Look
- The White Company
- Joules
- Next
- Apple
- Gromit Unleashed

=== Retail parks ===
The two retail parks are warehouse style shops with entrances from outside. Cribbs Retail Park is a group of large shops off Lysander Road containing Currys, Magnet Kitchens, Next Home, Oak Furniture Land, ScS, Smyths and Wren Kitchens. Nearby is Centaurus Retail Park containing B&M, Carpetright, Dreams, Go Outdoors, Halfords, Hobbycraft, HomeSense, Tapi Carpets and T.K. Maxx.

=== Other stores ===
Other large stores include the United Kingdom's first Asda Walmart Supercentre, which was originally built by the French hypermarket chain Carrefour in the late 1970s. Then when Carrefour pulled out of the UK it sold all of its stores, including the Bristol hypermarket, to the Dee Corporation which owned the Gateway store chain. Then Gateway sold all of its large-format stores to Asda in 1989, and it became an Asda hypermarket. Then after the sale of Asda by its management to Walmart in July 1999, it became the first Asda Walmart Supercentre in July 2000. The store has since had yet another major refurbishment and has been rebranded as an Asda Supercentre and the Walmart branding has been removed. This is also the location of the first Morrisons supermarket in the south-west of England which opened in September 2003. There is also a B&Q DIY store which also houses a Furniture Village, DFS, Makro and Wickes.

On Hollywood Lane, which passes under the M5 motorway, is the Cribbs Business Centre. Lysander House is located on Lysander Road on the site of the former Harry Ramsden's restaurant. A Bang & Olufsen store is located on Cribbs Causeway. Topps Tiles and Porcelanosa are located on Lysander Road. Miller & Carter Steakhouse, is also located on Cribbs Causeway. Redwood Farm, a Farmhouse Inns pub, is located on Catbrain Lane, next to Lysander House. IN'n'OUT Autocentre is situated behind Morrisons.

=== Cribbs Venue ===
Cribbs Venue (formerly known as The Venue at Cribbs Causeway) is an entertainment complex featuring an ice rink, a 12 screen Vue cinema, a ten-pin bowling alley (run by Hollywood Bowl), an Anytime Fitness gym, and eateries including Bella Italia, Burger King, Chiquitos, Nandos, Frankie & Benny's, KFC, Las Iguanas, PizzaExpress and T.G.I. Friday's.

==== Ice rink ====
An international standard permanent indoor ice rink opened at Cribbs Causeway in October 2021, in a purpose-built facility with a capacity for 1,300 spectators. Run by Planet Ice, and branded as Planet Ice Bristol, it is the first permanent ice rink in the area since the former Bristol Ice Rink closed in 2012. Planet Ice Bristol is the new home of the Bristol Pitbulls ice hockey team.

Prior to the opening of Planet Ice Bristol, Cribbs Causeway has hosted pop-up outdoor ice rinks in winter seasons.

== Car dealerships ==
The Cribbs Causeway area has become the home to many car dealerships in recent years these include: Aston Martin, Audi, BMW, Ford, Honda, Mercedes-Benz/Smart, Mini, Nissan, Peugeot, Porsche and Tesla. Rybrook Holdings opened a large showroom containing Bentley, Lamborghini, McLaren and Rolls-Royce vehicles in 2016. There was also a pop up Tesla Motors store on the upper floor of the mall, occupied by BMW over the 2014-2015 Christmas break, and again until May when preparations began for a permanent location directly above the old store. A Jaguar Land Rover dealership has also opened, just across from Planet Ice Bristol.

== Hotels ==
There are currently two hotels in the area. Mollies and a Travelodge are located on Cribbs Causeway, behind the Miller and Carter Steakhouse. Soho House have planning permission for a 123-room hotel on the site of the former Cribbs Lodge Hotel. There had been a Premier Inn on Catbrain Lane. On 17 July 2019 it was destroyed by a fire which caused part of the building to collapse onto Cribbs Causeway. It took nearly 48 hours to extinguish the flames. On 26 May 2020, Premier Inn’s parent company, the Whitbread Group, announced that they had secured planning permission to re-build, reusing the old building’s footprint but with an additional storey for a below-ground car park. Construction work on the new building had started, and was completed in 2021. An investigation into the incident was unable to find its cause, due to extensive fire damage and the building’s subsequent demolition.

== Transport ==
Cribbs Causeway Bus Station
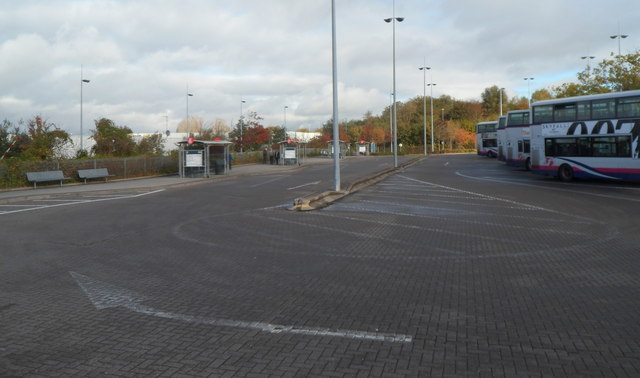

General information
- Location: Cribbs Causeway; South Gloucestershire
- Bus stands: 8
- Bus operators: First West of England, Stagecoach West, Newport Bus
- Connections: No

History
- Opened: 1998
Location

The Mall has over 7,000 parking spaces spread over a car park that is divided into different sections, and which is free to use. There are also large car parks at the retail parks and supermarkets.

=== Bus station ===
The station is situated at the mall and has eight stands. The bus station (the terminal for many bus routes) which is served by a considerable amount of bus services operating in Bristol, South Gloucestershire and North Somerset. Buses run from the bus station around the Bristol area and as far afield as Chepstow, Gloucester and Newport. The WESTlink on-demand bus, is available to the public Monday to Saturday.

=== Railway station ===
The area is not served by a railway station. The nearest, Patchway, around 1.5 miles (2.4 km) to the west. There are plans to re-open the nearby Henbury Loop Line to serve both the Cribbs Causeway area and the future development on the Filton Airfield site.

== Progress of expansion ==
In October 2014, plans to expand the shopping centre were revealed to the public in a public exhibition, including a 120-bed hotel, a new bus station, a multi-storey car park, a pedestrian link bridge over Merlin Road and 150 apartments, with the proposed expansion to increase the shopping centre by more than a half. Construction work was expected to start in 2017 and anticipated to open by 2021. After deferring the mall's £300 million expansion plan in February 2016, South Gloucestershire Council approved the plans in November 2016.

=== Sports facilities ===
Plans to build an ice rink, dry ski-slope, and indoor "ski-diving" facility were presented to the public in June 2015, with the Bristol Post reporting that the planning request was placed on 9 December 2015, with the intended site being next to the Vue cinema. On 7 April 2017 architects Atkins Walters & Webster reported that South Gloucestershire Council had approved the leisure development plans, which comprised "an ice rink, a sky-dive and ski centre, a hotel, a drive-thru coffee shop, retail, a restaurant and a car showroom", with the intention of including a "green corridor that enables future provision of the proposed pedestrian bridge to link to an expanded Mall Shopping Centre". Atkins Walters & Webster stated their "key aim is to create a permeable layout that links the Filton Airfield site to the wider Cribbs Causeway network".

In July 2019, the Bristol Post reported that plans for a dry-ski-slope facility had been "shelved", as the company due to deliver it, Skiplex, had gone into administration—and the developers were focusing on delivering the new ice rink.

The ice rink opened on 25 October 2021, after some delay caused by the COVID-19 pandemic. It is the new home rink of the Bristol Pitbulls ice hockey team, who played their first game at the rink on 30 October.

== See also ==
=== Nearby attractions ===
- Aerospace Bristol
- The Wave, Bristol
- Wild Place Project

=== Bristol shopping centres ===
- Broadmead
- Cabot Circus
- The Galleries, Bristol
