= Catbrain =

Village in South Gloucestershire, England

Coordinates: 51°31′21″N 2°36′46″W

Catbrain Hill, Bristol

Catbrain Hill, simply known as Catbrain, is a small village in South Gloucestershire, England, part of the suburban North Fringe of Bristol. It is located near Cribbs Causeway, on a road that contains many car dealerships. A new housing estate has been recently constructed at Catbrain, with more developments nearby underway as of 2022. At the bottom of the hill lies the runway of the former Bristol Filton Airport.

The area belongs to the postcode area BS10.

== Name history ==
"Cat's brain" is a common name for fields in the south of England. It comes from the Middle English "Cattes Brazen", referring to a rough clay mix used in soil at the time. There are other Catbrains in Wiltshire, Oxfordshire, Warwickshire, Northamptonshire, Buckinghamshire, Bedfordshire, Gloucestershire and Surrey. Catbrain has frequently been noted on lists of unusual place names, within the UK and beyond.

== Hazel Brook ==
The Hazel Brook rises in nearby Cribbs Causeway and its flow into the River Trym is controlled by an attenuation reservoir at Catbrain, which reduces the silt flowing into the system from the many shopping malls in the area. Measurements of pollution by the city council are made monthly.

== See also ==
Catbrain attenuation reservoir
