= Trym =

Trym may refer to:

- Þrymr (Thrym), a jötunn in Nordic mythology
- Trym Torson, a Norwegian drummer
- River Trym in Bristol
