= Hazel Brook =

Hazel Brook Hen
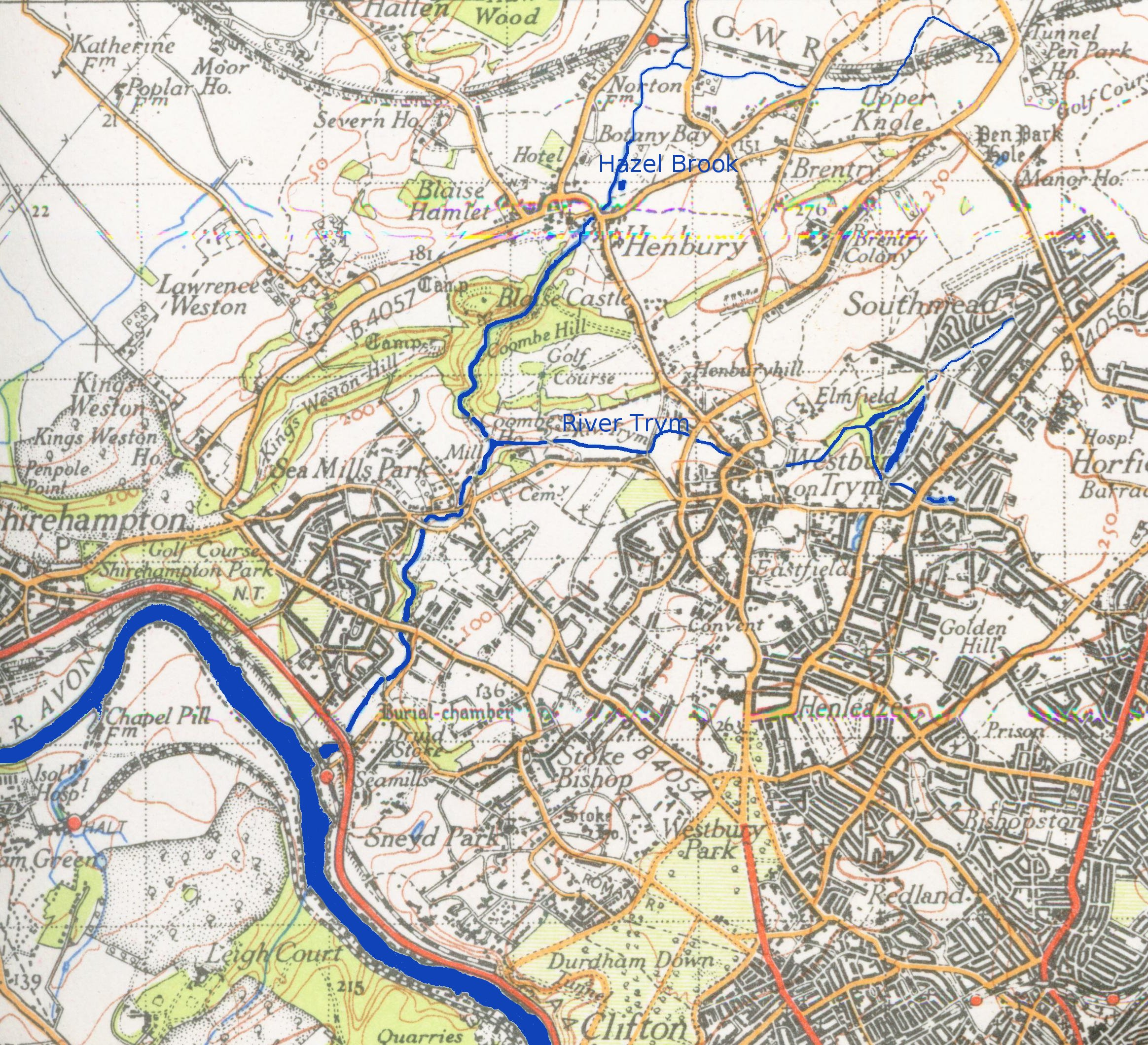
- River Trym and Hazel Brook in Bristol, England

Location
- Country: England
- District: South Gloucestershire
- Municipality: Bristol

Physical characteristics
- Source: Cribbs Causeway
  - location: South Gloucestershire, West of England, England
  - coordinates: 51.525°N 2.613°W
  - elevation: 263 ft (80 m)
- Mouth: Coombe Dingle
  - location: Bristol, West of England, England
  - coordinates: 51.495°N 2.641°W
  - elevation: 195 ft (59 m)
- Length: 2 mi (3.2 km)

Basin features
- River system: Bristol Avon

The Hazel Brook, also known as the Hen, is a tributary of the River Trym in Bristol, England. It rises at Cribbs Causeway in South Gloucestershire. From there, its course takes it south, passing the western end of Filton Aerodrome on its left bank, through Brentry and Henbury before dropping through a steep limestone gorge in the Blaise Castle estate. It continues south through two lakes before joining the Trym at Coombe Dingle.

== Hydrology ==
Surface run-off in the upper catchment of the Hazel Brook, especially from the large retail centre at Cribbs Causeway, sends a good deal of silt into the system, slowing the flow and creating a risk of flooding downstream in the Trym. This problem has now been partially alleviated by the construction of the Catbrain attenuation reservoir near Cribbs Causeway. Measurements of pollution by the city council show the water to be relatively clean.
