= Sea Mills, Bristol =

Suburb in Bristol, England

Coordinates: 51.4856°N 2.6422°W

Sea Mills
- Location within Bristol
- OS grid reference: ST551207
- Unitary authority: Bristol
- Ceremonial county: Bristol
- Region: South West
- Country: England
- Sovereign state: United Kingdom
- Post town: BRISTOL
- Postcode district: BS9
- Dialling code: 0117
- Police: Avon and Somerset
- Fire: Avon
- Ambulance: South Western
- UK Parliament: Bristol North West

Sea Mills is a suburb of Bristol, England, 3.5 miles (6 km) north-west of the city centre, between the former villages of Shirehampton, Westbury-on-Trym and Stoke Bishop, by the mouth of the River Trym where it joins the River Avon.

Since 2015, central and south-eastern Sea Mills have been in Stoke Bishop ward for elections to Bristol City Council and north-western Sea Mills in Avonmouth and Lawrence Weston ward, with a ward boundary along Sylvan Way (A4162). Sea Mills was previously in Kingsweston ward, with a ward boundary along the Trym.

== History ==
=== Origins ===
Sea Mills derives its name from a watermill just above the tidal limit of the River Trym, recorded first in 1411 as Semmille and in 1484 as Cemille. This probably meant that its grinding capacity was limited to one packhorse-load of grain (a seam) but was later misinterpreted to mean 'mill by the sea'. The name was subsequently extended to an adjacent farm on the north side of the Trym, Seamill Farm, and to one of the earliest wet docks in England, Seamill Dock − where dock gates retained water at the high-tide level.

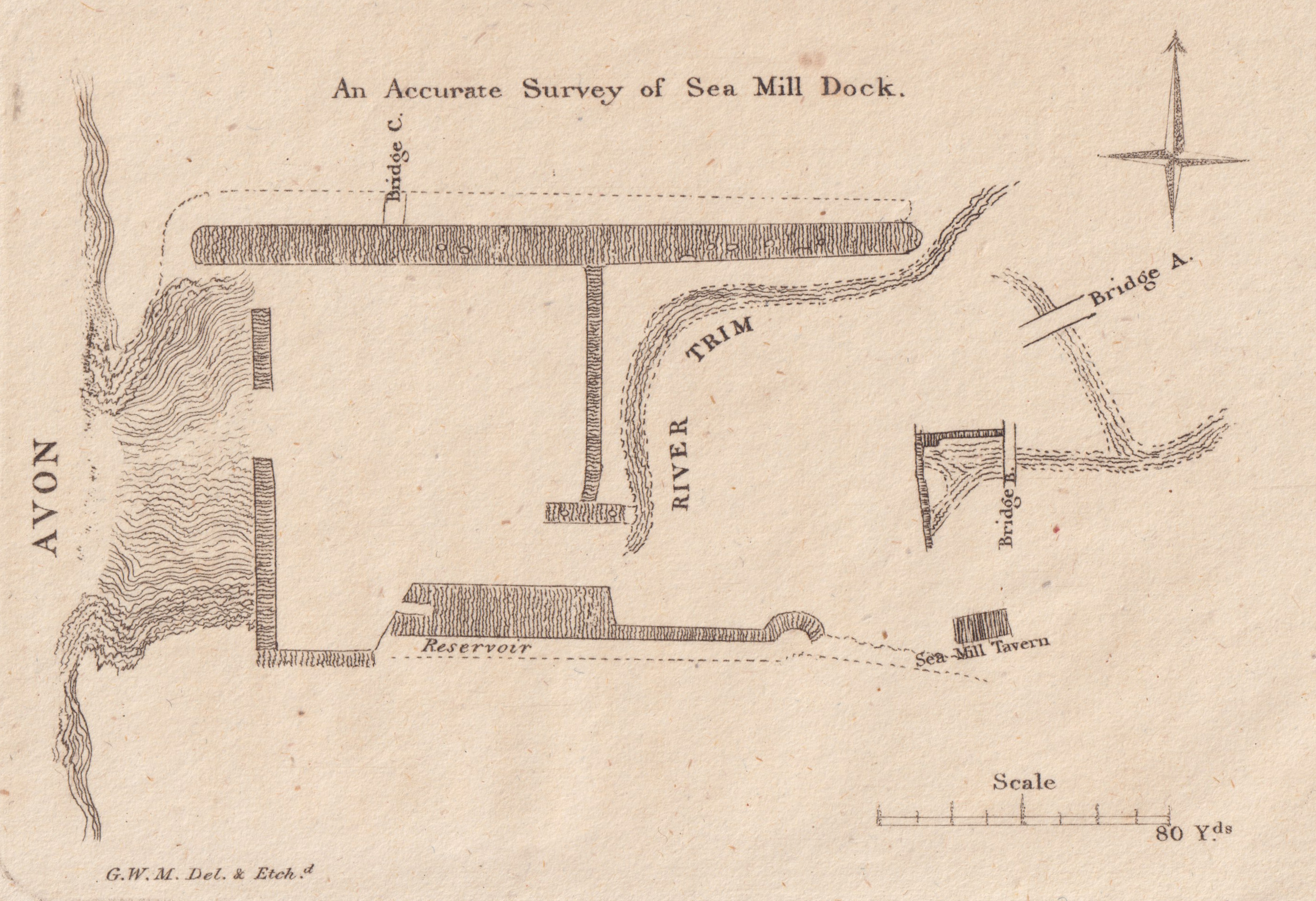
G. W. Manby's survey of the dock, 1802

Constructed on 12 acres (5 hectares) of land where the Trym joins the Avon, leased from the King's Weston Estate in 1712, the dock was intended "to provide a repair and ‘laying up’ facility for ships docking at the congested and vastly overcrowded quays further up [the Avon] in Bristol". But poor land transport links with Bristol doomed the enterprise. The dock and associated warehouses were abandoned in the 1760s. It was described and partially surveyed by the author and inventor, George William Manby, in 1802. The ruined dock walls survive, and pleasure craft were moored in the much silted-up harbour until recently.

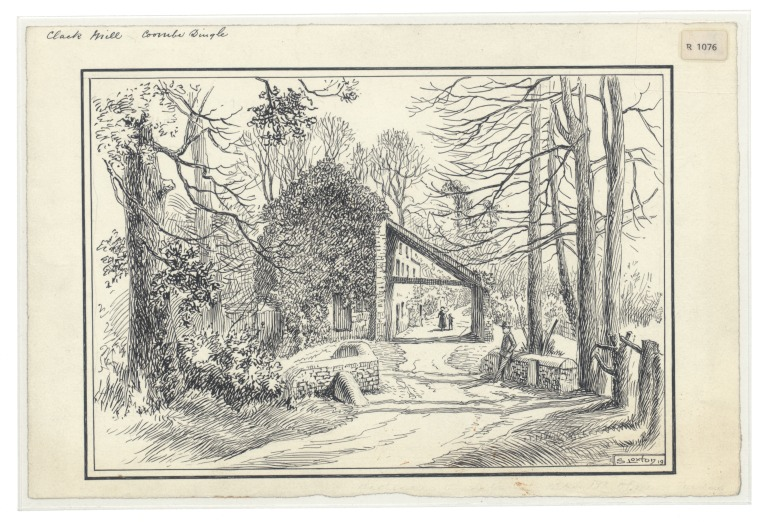
Clack Mill. Pen drawing by Samuel Loxton, dated 1919. Credit: Bristol Reference Library

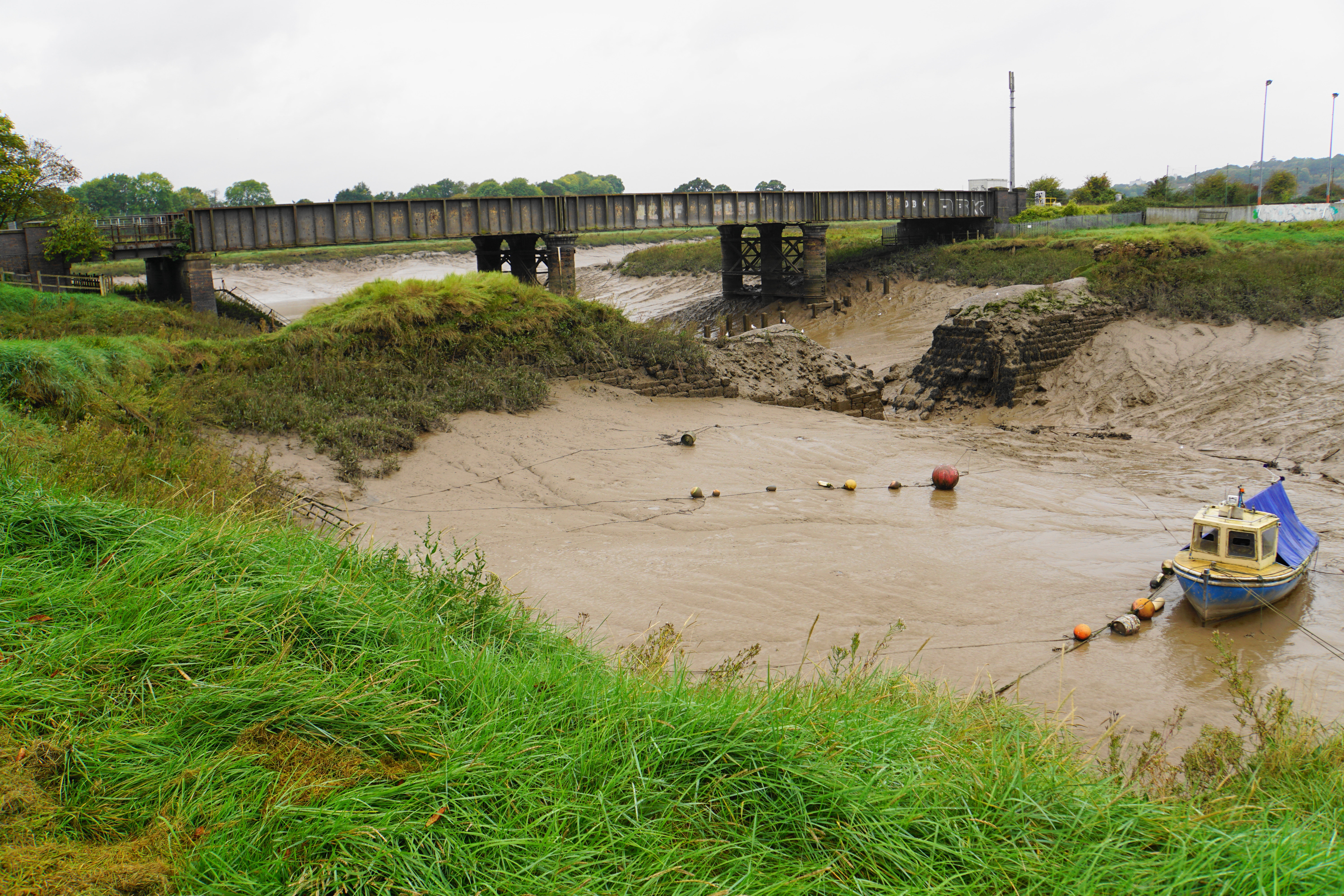
Seamill Dock ruins and railway bridge over the River Trym

Sea Mill had ceased to function before 1800, but two watermills further up the Trym, near the Sea Mills boundary, remained in use until the 20th century: Clack Mill, below what is now the bend on Coombe Bridge Avenue, and Coombe Mill, beyond the Blaise Castle Estate car park in Coombe Dingle. Both had been demolished by the 1950s and their mill leats and a mill pond obliterated.

By the time the first Ordnance Survey map of this part of Gloucestershire was published, in 1830, the present name Sea Mills had become established for the farm, dock area and an early 18th century tavern on Sea Mills Lane opposite what is now Sea Mills Depot. The tavern was turned into a farmhouse soon afterwards and renamed The Hermitage. It was demolished in the 1930s, before Trym Cross Road was constructed, and Sea Mills Lane and the course of the Trym were realigned.

=== Sea Mills Station ===
When the Bristol Port and Pier Railway Company standard gauge line (so named because Avonmouth as a port did not then exist) was opened beside the Avon in 1865, from Hotwells to a new deep water pier at Avonmouth, the station built on the south side of the Trym to serve the mansions and villas of the wealthy districts of Stoke Bishop and Sneyd Park was therefore called Sea Mills. The line was single track, standard gauge and, as built, unconnected to any other railway line. Of course, most other local railways were to Brunel's broad gauge. On opening it had twenty four-wheeled passenger coaches and six goods wagons so the emphasis was clearly on passengers and their time saving by catching steamers at the Avonmouth pier rather than in the centre of Bristol. On Saturday 3rd June 1865 the pier was opened when the S. S. Apollo landed passengers from Cork saving them at least four hours on a journey to London. Passenger services with Bristol’s principal railway station at Temple Meads were established in 1886, after the construction of a mile-long tunnel under the Downs from Clifton Down railway station to the Avon Gorge, and still operate. Whereas the original railway line between Hotwells and the connection with the Clifton Extension Railway at Sneyd Park Junction was closed in 1922 to make way for the Portway.

=== Abona ===
There was an ancient folk memory of a Roman port at the mouth of the Trym, and much Roman material was unearthed when Seamill Dock was constructed. All finds then and later have been on the south side of the river. In the 1820s it was proposed and generally accepted that this was the site of the port of Abona (Avon), linking Silchester and Bath with Venta Silurum (Caerwent) in Wales, on Route 14 of the 3rd-century Antonine Itinerary’s Britannia section. There was then no other port on the Avon or other town in the Bristol area. Piecemeal archaeological excavations have since found evidence of the street pattern, buildings within the small Roman town and cemeteries outside it.

=== Sea Mills Garden Suburb ===
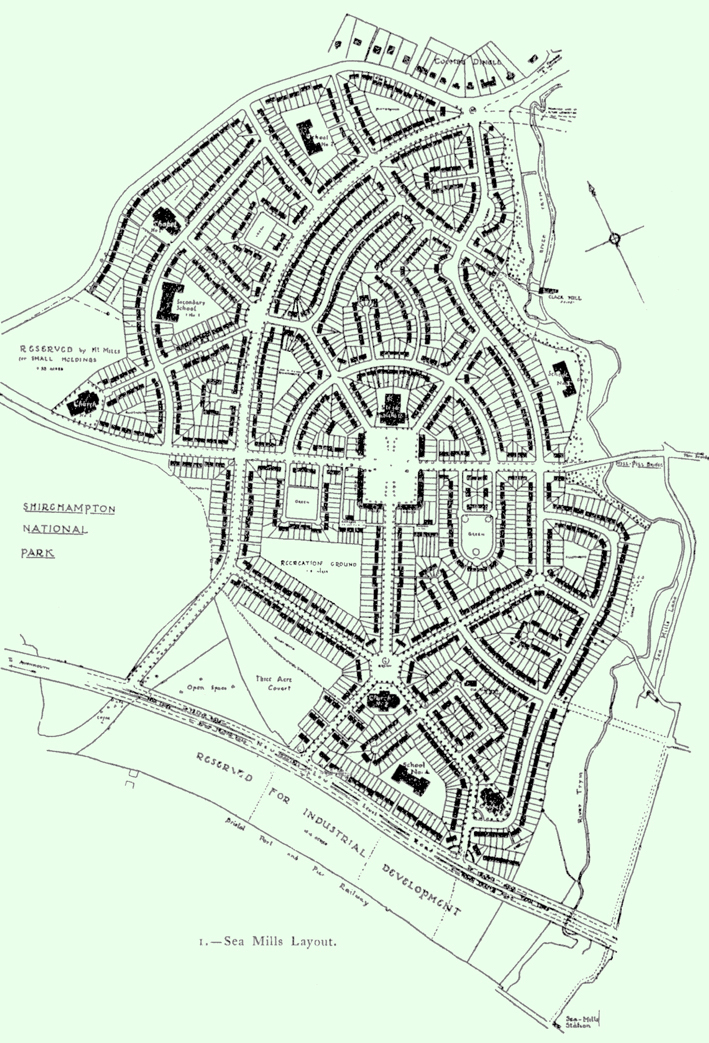
First published plan - Architect's Journal, 16 June 1920

The Sea Mills area was entirely rural until the British government launched a heavily subsidised scheme after the First World War to build "homes fit for heroes". The legislation did not receive royal assent until 31 July 1919. To ensure rapid implementation, however, that April Bristol Corporation had bought two farms on the southern edge of the King’s Weston Estate, on which to build a low-density garden suburb for the working classes to standards recommended in the Tudor Walters Report that the legislation was based upon. The suburb takes its name from Sea Mills Farm, although the greater part was built over the former Clack Mill Farm, Shirehampton Road marks the boundary between them; the early 18th century Sea Mills farmhouse was to be preserved, but all buildings on Clack Mill Farm were demolished.

Dr Christopher Addison, the minister responsible for what were generally called the Addison Acts, visited Sea Mills on 4 June 1919 to cut the first sod on the new council estate and a commemorative tree was planted. Addison's Oak still stands on Sea Mills Square, actually an elongated semicircle at the centre of the garden suburb, and was a runner-up in the 2019 Woodland Trust tree of the year competition. "The Square" was to have been a quadrangle, bisected by Shirehampton Road, but the initial plan was modified to follow a celebrated design by the chief architect of the national housing scheme, Raymond Unwin, who had ultimate responsibility for approving the Sea Mills layout. In the course of development, the plan was further modified to be less dense and formal, with fewer right-angles and squares and more open spaces, to follow contour lines, and to create a more coherent northern framework.

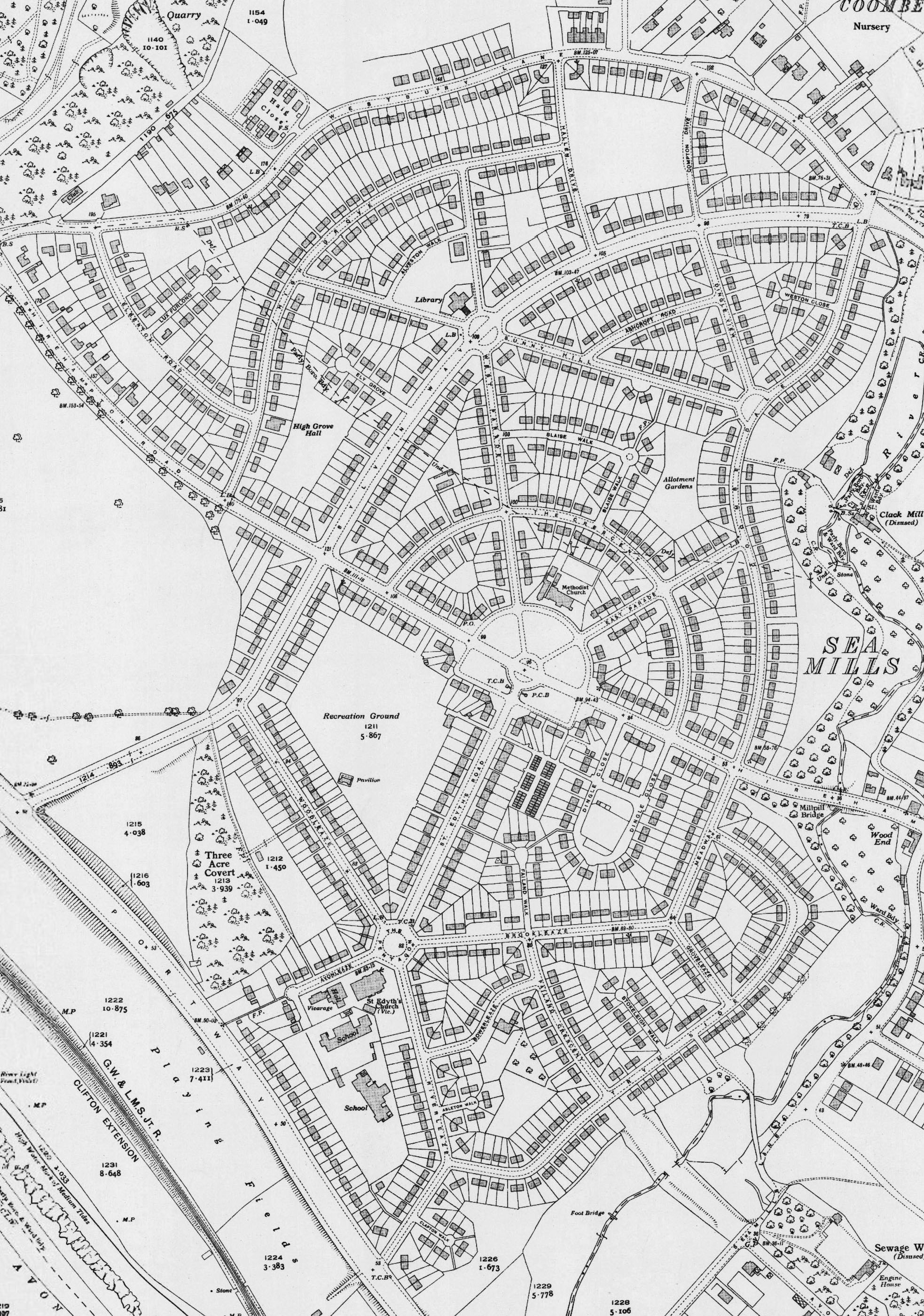
Sea Mills in 1936, OS 25" map

The vendor of the farms, Philip Napier Miles of Kings Weston House, took a keen interest in the design and layout of the garden suburb, stipulating in the deeds of sale that the density should be not less than 8 and not more than 12 houses per acre, and that layout and building designs were to be agreed with him. He donated open spaces between Shirehampton Road and the Portway as recreational areas, gave what is now Shirehampton Park Golf Course to the National Trust, and donated land for the Portway.

A total of 1279 houses were built between 1920 and 1931. Of these, 1030 were council houses, 156 (including 12 shops on Sea Mills Square) were leased, and 93 were privately built and leased. All had a bathroom and inside toilet, scullery/kitchen, one or two reception rooms, and back gardens large enough to grow fruit and vegetables and to keep chickens. Most had three bedrooms, but there were some with four bedrooms for large families. This was Bristol Corporation’s flagship estate, and rents were relatively high. Strict maintenance standards and uniformity were enforced, even down to the height of privet hedges throughout the estate.

=== Centenary celebrations ===
In 2019 the Sea Mills 100 project, funded by the National Lottery Heritage Fund and Bristol City Council celebrated the centenary of “homes fit for heroes” municipal housing. Events included a 100th birthday celebration for Addison's Oak and a weekend-long heritage trail around the estate. Its lasting legacy is a mini-museum situated in a K6 phone box on Sea Mills Square, which was renovated by local volunteers as part of the project. The project also published a book, How Lucky I Was, written by people who grew up in the area between the 1930s and 1950s, including novelist Derek Robinson.

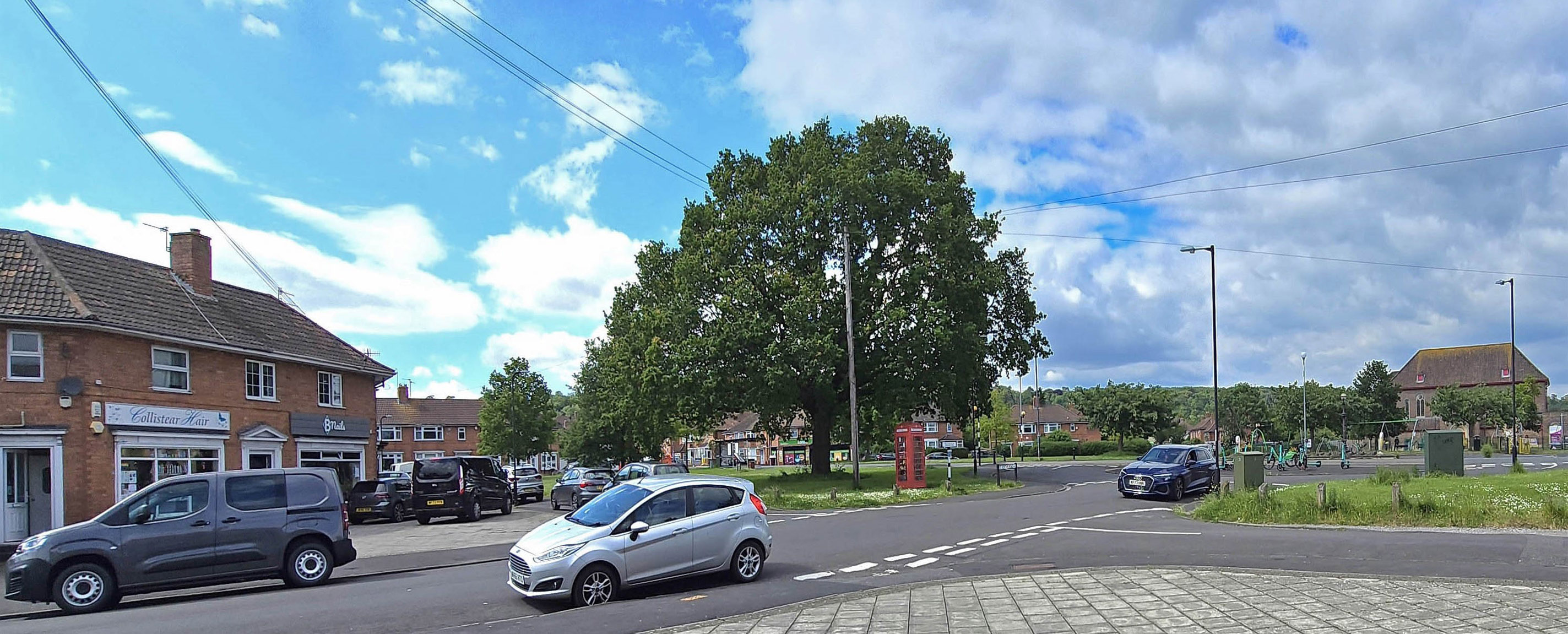
Sea Mills Square. Addison's Oak and Red Telephone Box mini-museum in centre, Methodist church on right

== Public buildings ==
Of the five churches and chapels proposed in the earliest published plan, only two were built, the Methodist church on Sea Mills Square (opened in 1931) and St Edyth’s (Church of England, consecrated in 1928), at each end of the garden suburb’s focal axis. St. Edyth’s Road linking them, the finest road in the suburb, was built privately in 1923/24 to plans probably by Mr Napier Miles’s advisory architects for the Sea Mills project. Both St Edyth's Church and Sea Mills Methodist Church were designed by the celebrated Bristol architect Sir George Oatley.

In 1933 High Grove Hall was built on High Grove for a congregation of Christian Brethren. Renamed Highgrove Church, it was re-established as an independent evangelical church in 1983 and subsequently founded the Woodlands Church Family.

The congregation having greatly diminished, the Methodist church and an associated church hall and manse were sold in 2004 to the Methodist Housing Association (now MHA), which reduced the size of the church and constructed sheltered housing, Abona Court, within the remainder of the premises. The church finally closed in 2019. It has been leased to Sea Mills Community Initiatives (a local charity, founded in 2009) and is available for hire for community events.

The only pre-war school to be built, Sea Mills Junior School (next to St Edyth’s Church), opened on its present site in 1928. A second block, initially for infants, opened in 1931. The infants’ school moved in the 1950s to purpose-built premises on Hallen Drive, an empty site earmarked for a school in the 1920 plan. That has now been demolished, the infants’ school has moved back to new buildings on the Junior School site, and the Hallen Drive site is being redeveloped by North Star Academy Trust.

A public library, not envisaged in the 1920 plan, was opened in 1934. It occupies a dominant position at a focal point on Sylvan Way. A community centre for the suburb was built behind it on Sunny Hill in the late 1950s. Also dating from the 1950s is a former public toilet block on Sea Mills Square. Converted and run by Sea Mills Community Initiatives, the popular Café on the Square was formally opened by the Princess Royal on 24 May 2012 (a commemorative plaque and photographs are in the café).

== Conservation Area ==
In view of its early date and integrity as a garden suburb "fit for heroes", in 1981, Sea Mills was one of the first housing estates in the country to be designated as a conservation area. Initially, the designation extended to the north only as far as Sylvan Way (a council ward boundary since 2015); to the east to include the part of the Trym valley bordering the garden suburb; to the west the River Avon adjacent to the rest of the conservation area and land between it and the Portway; and to the south the old Sea Mills harbour and land immediately behind it: Sea Mills Station, adjacent late Victorian and 1950s signal stations on the Avon, Roman ruins at the entrance of Roman Way, allotments opposite the station, and 1940s prefabricated houses on Hadrians Close (since demolished but mostly not later built over). The allotments and Hadrians Close area were included because they probably overlie relatively undisturbed archaeological remains of Abona.

The Sea Mills conservation area was extended in 2008 to include the rest of the garden suburb up to Westbury Lane, including the north side of the lane, which was not part of the garden suburb but forms "an essential ‘setting area’ … which continues [its] verdant, spacious and low density character". This includes: Haig Close (the name refers to Douglas Haig the WW1 army commander), a small pre-war estate of almshouses originally built for disabled ex-servicemen and their families by Bristol Corporation on land given by Mr Napier Miles; a large former public house built in 1938, now the Red Bus Nursery and Pre-School Coombe Dingle; and a small 1930s parade of shops. Also included are houses privately built by the King’s Weston Estate in the 1930s, as part of the garden suburb, on land noted in the 1920 plan as being intended for smallholdings. At its southern edge the conservation area was also extended to include an early 18th century merchant’s house on Sea Mills Lane close to the harbour area.

== Sport and Recreation ==
Sea Mills has a football team Sea Mills Park FC, formed in 1925. The 1st team play in the Bristol Premier Combination. They were Bristol & District Senior League Champions 2012/13. Historically, their games were played at the Rec, the recreation ground south-west of Sea Mills Square, but now all home games are played at Kingsweston Sports & Social, Napier Miles. Also part of the original suburban layout are tennis courts south-east of the Square.

The Portway Rugby Development Centre was opened in October 2006. It has two outdoor 3G Crumb pitches suitable for rugby and football, outdoor grass rugby pitches, grass training grids, and two meeting rooms. Various local rugby and football clubs use the facilities, including St Brendans RFC, Clifton RFC and Wanderers FC.

== Transport ==
There are frequent bus services on Shirehampton Road, Westbury Lane, Sylvan Way and the Portway to much of Bristol, including the city centre, Avonmouth, Westbury-on-Trym, Southmead and Cribbs Causeway.

Sea Mills station, on Bristol’s only suburban railway line, has half-hourly services to Temple Meads and Avonmouth from early morning to late evening six days a week, and hourly services from mid morning to mid evening on Sundays. Many are services to and from Weston-super-Mare. There have been no station staff since 1967; the station buildings were later sold off. Since then tickets have had to be bought on the train, as there is no ticket machine at the station.

The Portway (A4) trunk road passes along the south-western edge of Sea Mills and links central Bristol with its port at Avonmouth. Running parallel to the River Avon, the Portway was the most expensive road in the UK when it was opened in 1926. Both the Portway and the railway line have bridges over the Trym at Sea Mills.

== Notable people ==
- Robin Cousins, former Olympic champion figure skater
- Roger Hallett, artist
- The Cougars, band
- Derek Robinson, novelist
- Simon King, broadcaster
