= Coombe Dingle =

Suburb of Bristol, England

Coordinates: 51.4952°N 2.6460°W

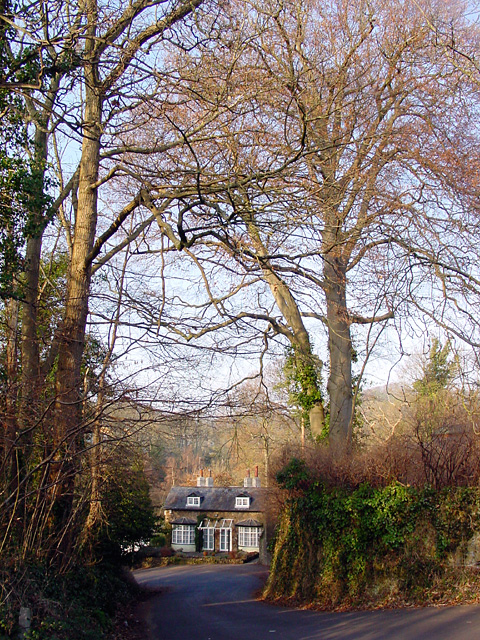
- The Dingle, Coombe Dingle

- Location within Bristol
- OS grid reference: ST552775
- Unitary authority: Bristol
- Ceremonial county: Bristol
- Region: South West
- Country: England
- Sovereign state: United Kingdom
- Post town: BRISTOL
- Postcode district: BS9
- Dialling code: 0117
- Police: Avon and Somerset
- Fire: Avon
- Ambulance: South Western
- UK Parliament: Bristol North West

Coombe Dingle is a suburb of Bristol, England, centred near where the Hazel Brook tributary of the River Trym emerges from a limestone gorge bisecting the Blaise Castle Estate to join the main course of the Trym. Historically this area formed part of the parish of Westbury on Trym, Gloucestershire, and it is now part of Avonmouth and Lawrence Weston ward of the city of Bristol. South of Coombe Dingle is Sea Mills; to the north is Kings Weston Hill; to the west are Kings Weston House and Shirehampton Park; and to the east, Henbury Golf Club and Westbury on Trym proper.

The inhabited place appears simply as Combe, Coomb or Coombe, meaning 'short bowl-shaped valley', in documents from the 13th century onwards and on early maps. The name applied to Coombe Farm and Coombe House on the eastern side of the confluence of the Hazel Brook and the Trym, not where the modern suburb lies. This area later became noted for its cherry orchards, commemorated in a modern house-name, and a nursery. Strictly speaking, Coombe Dingle was the wooded narrow valley through which the Trym passes south-west of the farm and house to flow southwards through Sea Mills to the River Avon. The name of the narrow valley was borrowed for the new development consisting mostly of private housing built to the west of the Trym in the 1920s and 1930s on an area called Boulton's (or Bowden's) Fields. It was and remains a desirable area to live. Near the western edge is Haig Close, a small development of houses originally built for ex-servicemen in 1929 on land donated from the Kingsweston Estate by Philip Napier Miles, though this is generally said to be in Sea Mills.

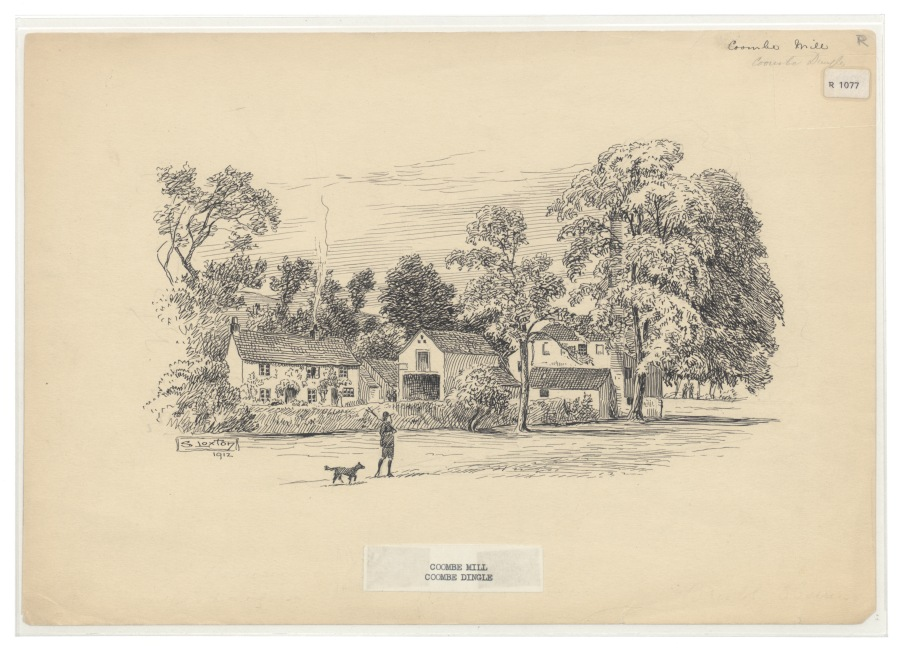
Coombe Mill in the Dingle. Pen drawing by Samuel Loxton 1857 – 1922. Credit: Bristol Reference Library.

Coombe Dingle was once a popular destination for outings from Bristol, and there was a well-known tea-room and tea garden in the wooded Dingle itself, now a private house (just West of Grove Road on The Dingle). It was there by 1888 and used to be known as Appletree Cottage. The original winding road passing it, called The Dingle, has been bypassed by the modern A4162, which is carried across the river on its own bridge with a classical-style balustrade. The bridge was completed in 1927. The bridge is made of in situ cast concrete. It is quite an early example showing the arch design of brick and stone bridges, but built of a material for which an arch is unnecessary. In the Dingle itself, the river drove a flour mill called Coombe Mill.

Below Coombe House, just above the confluence of the Trym and Hazel Brook, was a sluice where the footbridge now is. This diverted the water through a mill stream to Hazel Brook. Another sluice there diverted the water into a millstream which ran approximately below where the main path now runs down to the site of the mill. This clever arrangement meant that when the flow in Hazel Brook was low the miller could use the water of the River Trym as well as that of Hazel Brook.

Coombe House which stood to the South of the confluence of Hazel Brook and the Trym, backing on to Canford Lane, was the home of John Graves Livingston (born J.G. Thompson) who was a long time director and chairman of the Ffestiniog Railway Company.

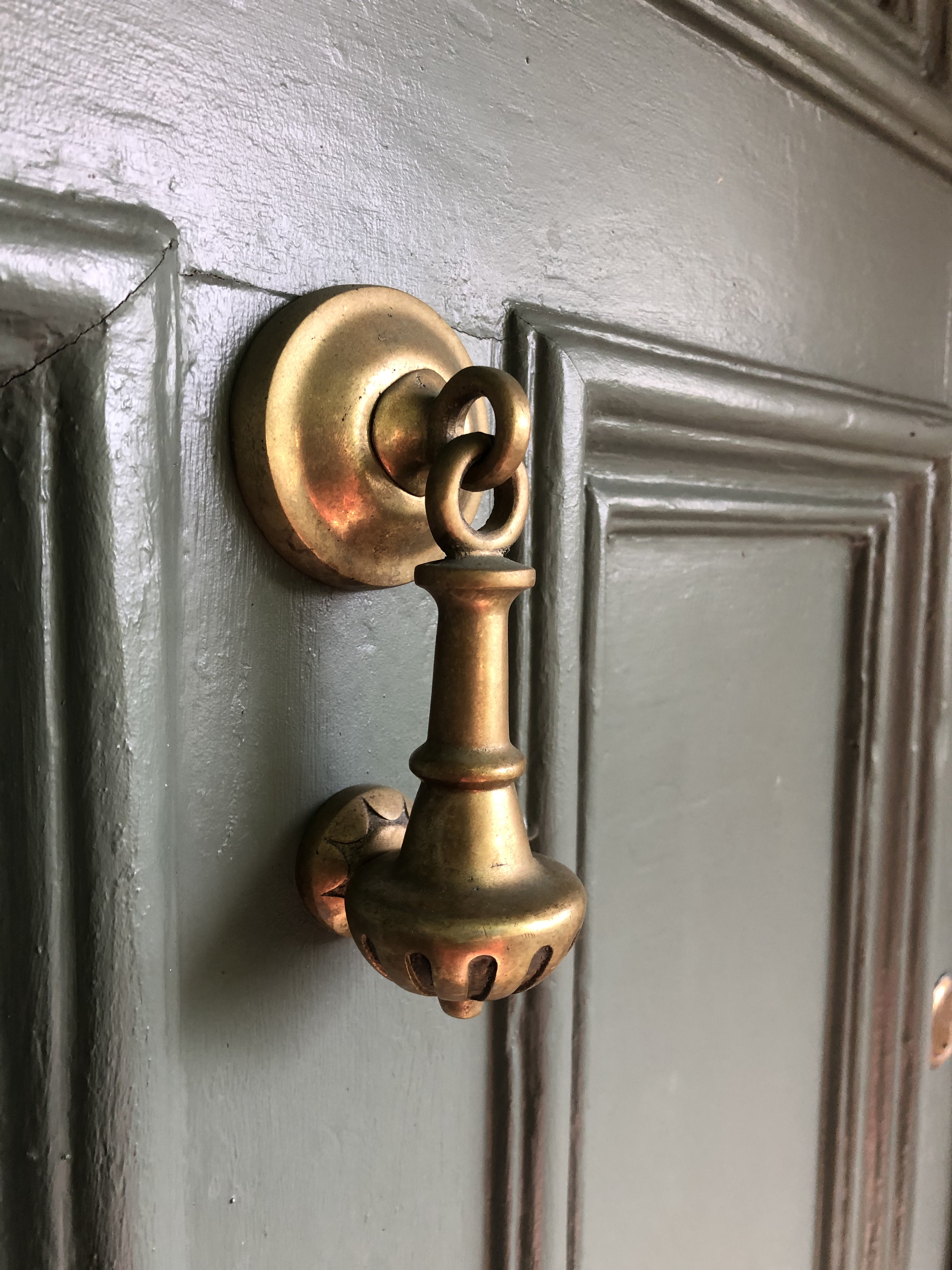
The brass knocker on the lodge of Coombe House.

There is a parade of shops on Westbury Lane. There used to be, close to the road bridge and near the northern end of Coombe Lane, a "tin tabernacle" Methodist chapel. It was a small building with plain Gothic-style windows dating from the 1890s, demolished in the mid-1990s and replaced by a house. There are no other places of worship in Coombe Dingle.

Coombe Lane is the home of Bristol University sports complex, which is commonly referred to as Coombe Dingle, though it is really in Stoke Bishop.
