= Furniture Village =

British furniture retailer

Furniture Village Limited
- Formerly: Kiteshield plc (October–December 1988)
- Industry: Retail
- Founded: 1989
- Founder: Peter Harrison; David Imrie
- Headquarters: Slough, England, UK
- Number of locations: 50+
- Products: Furniture
- Website: furniturevillage.co.uk

Furniture Village Limited is a British furniture retailer. It has over fifty stores throughout the United Kingdom, the first of which was opened in Abingdon, and also sells online. The company is headquartered in Slough. It is the largest privately owned furniture chain in the United Kingdom. Their target market is the upper end of the price range for the moderately rich. Their advertising has attempted to establish quality, rather than price, as the distinguishing point from competitors DFS.

== History ==
The company was established in 1989 by Peter Harrison and David Imrie in partnership with Cadogan Estates. Cadogan Estates sold its 70% stake in the chain to its management, led by Peter Harrison, in December 2001. In August 2002, Furniture Village bought three Conroys stores from the administrators to give it a presence in North East England. Also in 2002, the company launched an upmarket retail brand, the London Furniture Company, but this was unsuccessful and closed in 2005.

== Awards ==
Furniture Village has won trade magazine Cabinet Maker's awards for small, medium and large retailer of the year. It won the National Interiors Retailer of the Year award for 2007. Furniture Village has won The National Bed Federation (NBF) award for Multiple Bed Retailer of the Year 2014/15. The award was presented at a gala dinner following the UK's largest bed exhibition, The Telford Bed Show, where the UK's leading bed retailers and suppliers were in attendance.

In June 2020, they won the Retail Family Business of the Year. The company was also named Bed Retailer of the Year 2020/2021 by the National Bed Federation. They have not won anything since.
