= Kings Weston Hill =

Hill in Bristol, England

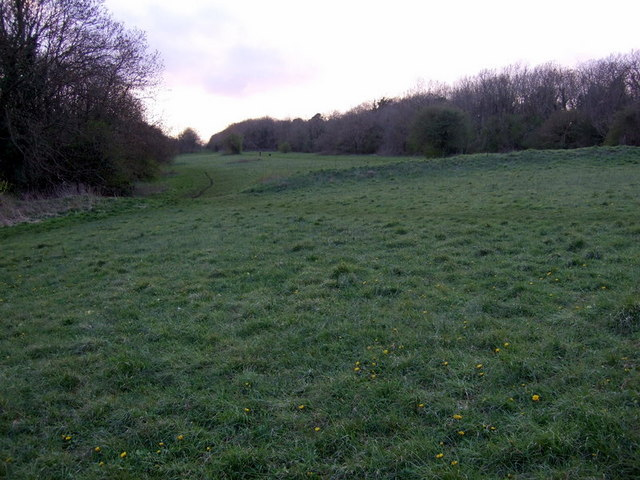
- King's Weston hill fort

- Location within Bristol
- 51°30′1.93″N 2°38′25.14″W
- Type: Hill fort
- Periods: Iron Age
- Location: near Henbury
- Region: Bristol, England

Site notes
- Condition: some damage

Kings Weston Hill (grid reference ST556781) is a hill in the north of Bristol, England. It forms a ridge about 1 mile (1.6 km) long, extending from Henbury to Shirehampton and separating Lawrence Weston to the north from Coombe Dingle to the south. The hill is a public open space managed as part of the Blaise Castle Estate. It takes its name from the settlement of Kings Weston, now absorbed into Lawrence Weston.

At the eastern end of Kings Weston Hill is the site of an Iron Age hill fort, which is a Scheduled Ancient Monument.

The hill is located between Kings Weston House to the southwest, and Blaise Castle to the northeast, and the hill is also the site of a tower for television broadcasting.
