= River Trym =

Short river in the United Kingdom

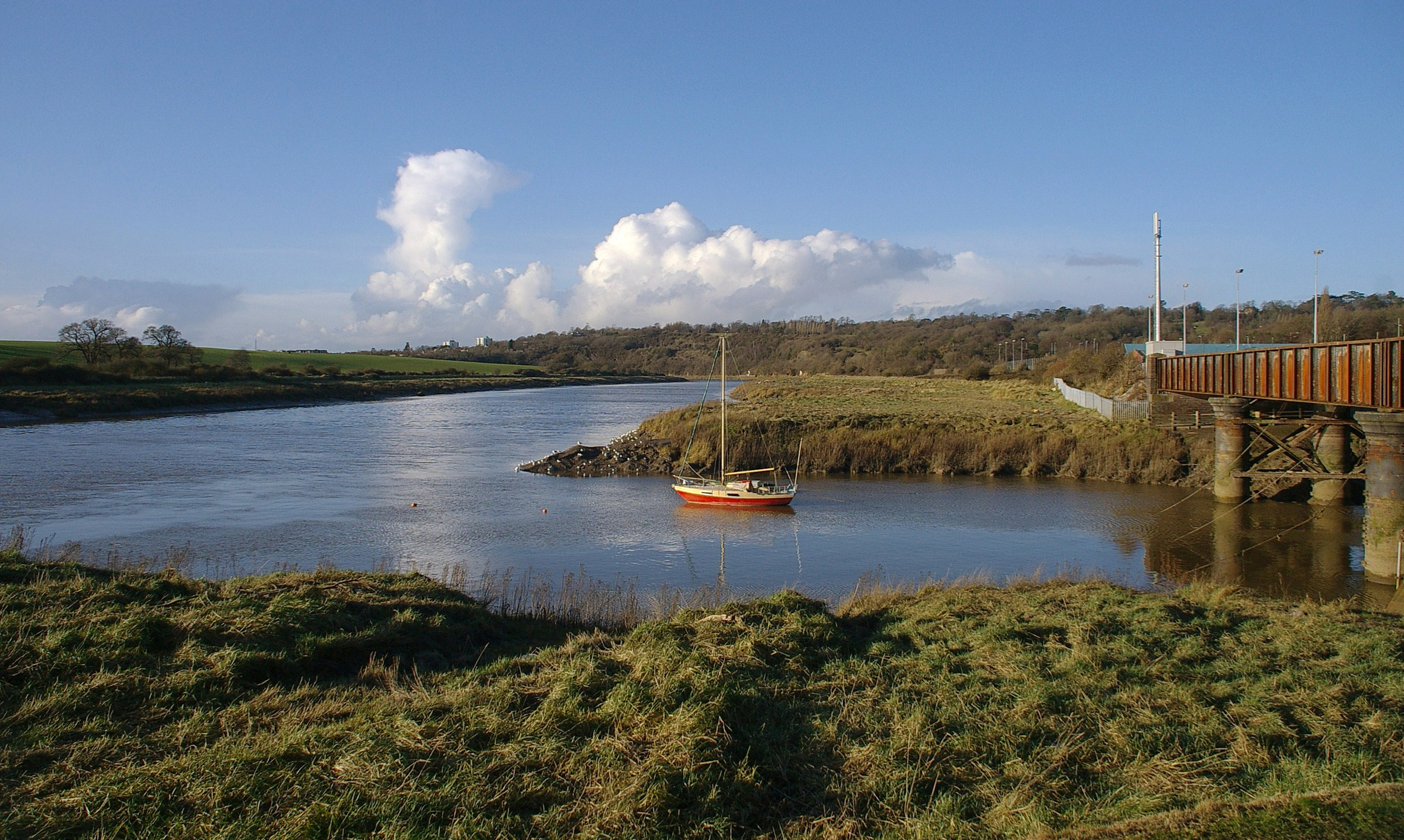
- The River Trym where it joins the Avon at Sea Mills.

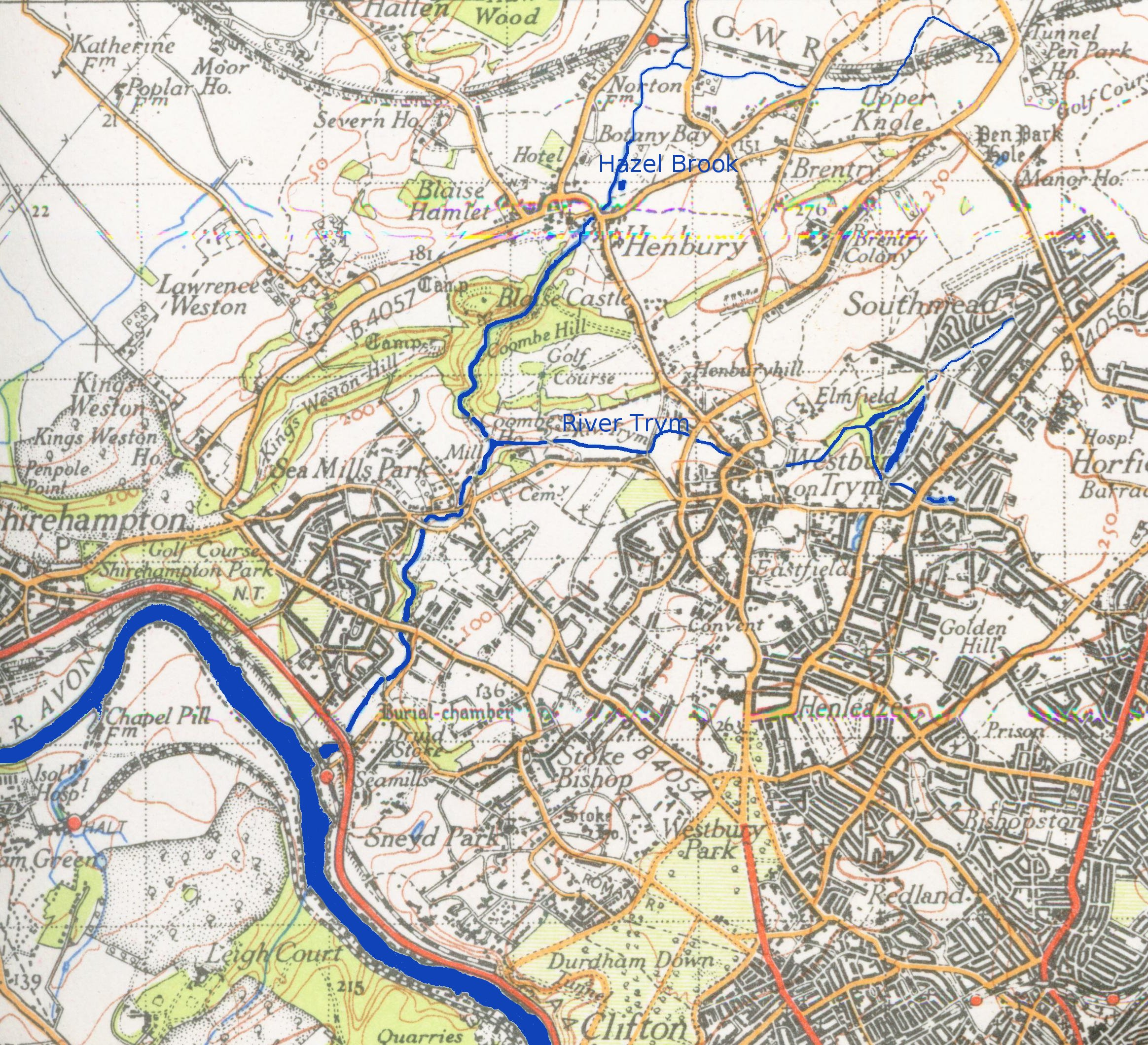
- River Trym and Hazel Brook within Bristol

Location
- Country: England
- District: Bristol
- City: Bristol

Physical characteristics
- Source: Filton
  - location: Bristol, West of England, England
  - coordinates: 51.512°N 2.588°W
  - elevation: 250 ft (76 m)
- Mouth: River Avon (Bristol)
  - location: Sea Mills, Bristol, England
  - coordinates: 51.480474°N 2.650537°W
  - elevation: 33 ft (10 m)
- Length: 4.5 mi (7.2 km)

Basin features
- Tributaries
  - right: Hazel Brook
- River system: Bristol Avon

The River Trym is a short river, some 4.5 miles (7.2 km) in length, which rises in Filton, South Gloucestershire, England. The upper reaches are culverted, some underground, through mostly urban landscapes, but once it emerges into the open it flows through a nature reserve and city parks before joining the tidal River Avon at Sea Mills. A medieval water mill near its mouth gave the area its name. Abona was a Roman port at the mouth of the Trym which provided an embarkation point for journeys across the River Severn to south Wales. In the 18th century there were short lived attempts at creating a port and a whale fishery here. The name Trym appears to have Anglo-Saxon roots. In recent years silting problems, caused by urban development, have caused some difficulties, but alleviation works have helped reduce the problem.

== Course ==
The Trym rises near Filton in South Gloucestershire, in the area of Filton Golf Club, and much of its upper course is culverted underneath 20th century housing. It surfaces in the Bristol suburb of Southmead, then flows open through Badock's Wood nature reserve. Just south of here is Henleaze Swimming Lake, a former quarry fed by springs, the overflow running into the Trym. The river is culverted through Westbury-on-Trym village. A sluice here is used to divert water into a storm drain in times of high rainfall to save the village centre from flooding.

The Trym then disappears into culverts, re-emerging at Henbury Golf Club before entering the Blaise Castle estate, where it is joined on the right bank by the Hazel Brook above Coombe Dingle. The remains of Coombe Mill, which was fed by both the Hazel Brook and the Trym, can be seen here. Passing under Dingle Road bridge, the river then flows through Sea Mills river park, passing under the Portway and the Severn Beach railway line before joining the river Avon. A weir under the Portway prevents flooding upstream, except during the highest spring tides.

== Natural history ==
Badock's Wood in Southmead is a nature reserve managed by Bristol City Council. Areas of beech, oak and ash woodland support a range of other bushes and shrubs, including hazel, maple, hawthorn and blackthorn. Badock's Meadow, a former prefab housing estate, has been reseeded with native meadow plants including oxeye daisies, yellow rattle, wild carrot and knapweed. Wildlife includes native woodland birds including woodpeckers and owls, also pipistrelle bats.

The Blaise Castle estate contains a variety of trees and plant life, also providing cover for birds and small mammals. Further downstream, just above Sea Mills, Himalayan Balsam and Japanese Knotweed, both invasive riverside plants, have established themselves. Ducks and moorhen can be found along many stretches of the river, with gulls and estuary birds near the mouth.

A pollution incident by Wessex Water which allowed sewage to flow into the Trym in 2001, killing eels, sticklebacks and invertebrates, resulted in a fine following prosecution by the Environment Agency. Other pollution incidents have followed.

== History ==
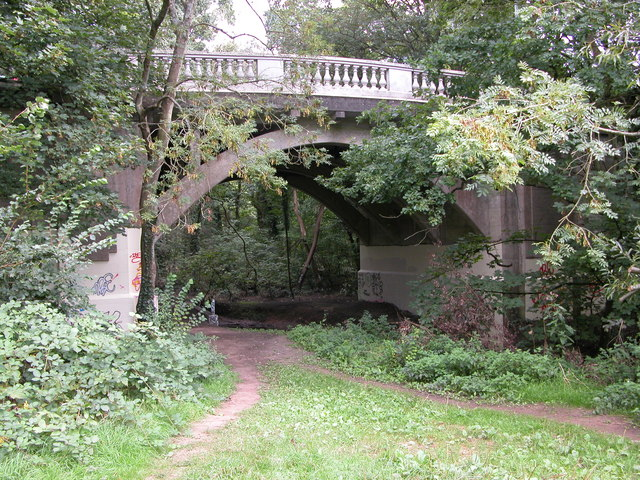
Bridge crossing the River Trym at Coombe Dingle.

At the confluence of the Trym with the Avon was the Roman port and small town of Abona, which took its name from the main river Avon, which simply means 'river' in British Celtic. Abona was a staging point for the Roman invasion of Wales and was at the western end of the Roman road from Silchester.

By the 15th century there was a water mill just above the tidal limit of the Trym. In later centuries there were also two water mills in Coombe Dingle: Clack Mill (also known as Black Mill) beside what is now the bend in Coombe Bridge Avenue, and Coombe Mill where the Hazel Brook joins the Trym.

An attempt was made in 1712 by the entrepreneur Joshua Franklyn to open a commercial dock at the mouth of the Trym, on the Roman site, but the venture foundered after a few decades. A whale fishery enterprise set up in 1752 was equally short lived. Parts of the dock walls can still be seen.

== Etymology ==
Linguistics sources indicate that the name Trym may derive from the Anglo-Saxon, meaning 'firm' or 'strong' one'.

== Hydrology ==
The flow of the river has decreased in power in recent years, partly because of surface run-off in the upper catchment of the Hazel Brook, especially from the large retail centre at Cribbs Causeway. The run-off sends a good deal of silt into the system, slowing the flow and creating a risk of flooding downstream. This problem has now been partially alleviated by the construction of the Catbrain attenuation reservoir near Cribbs Causeway. Measurements of pollution by the city council show the water to be relatively clean.
