= Avonmouth and Lawrence Weston =

Electoral ward in Bristol, England

Coordinates: 51.501°N 2.699°W

- ward Bristol City Council
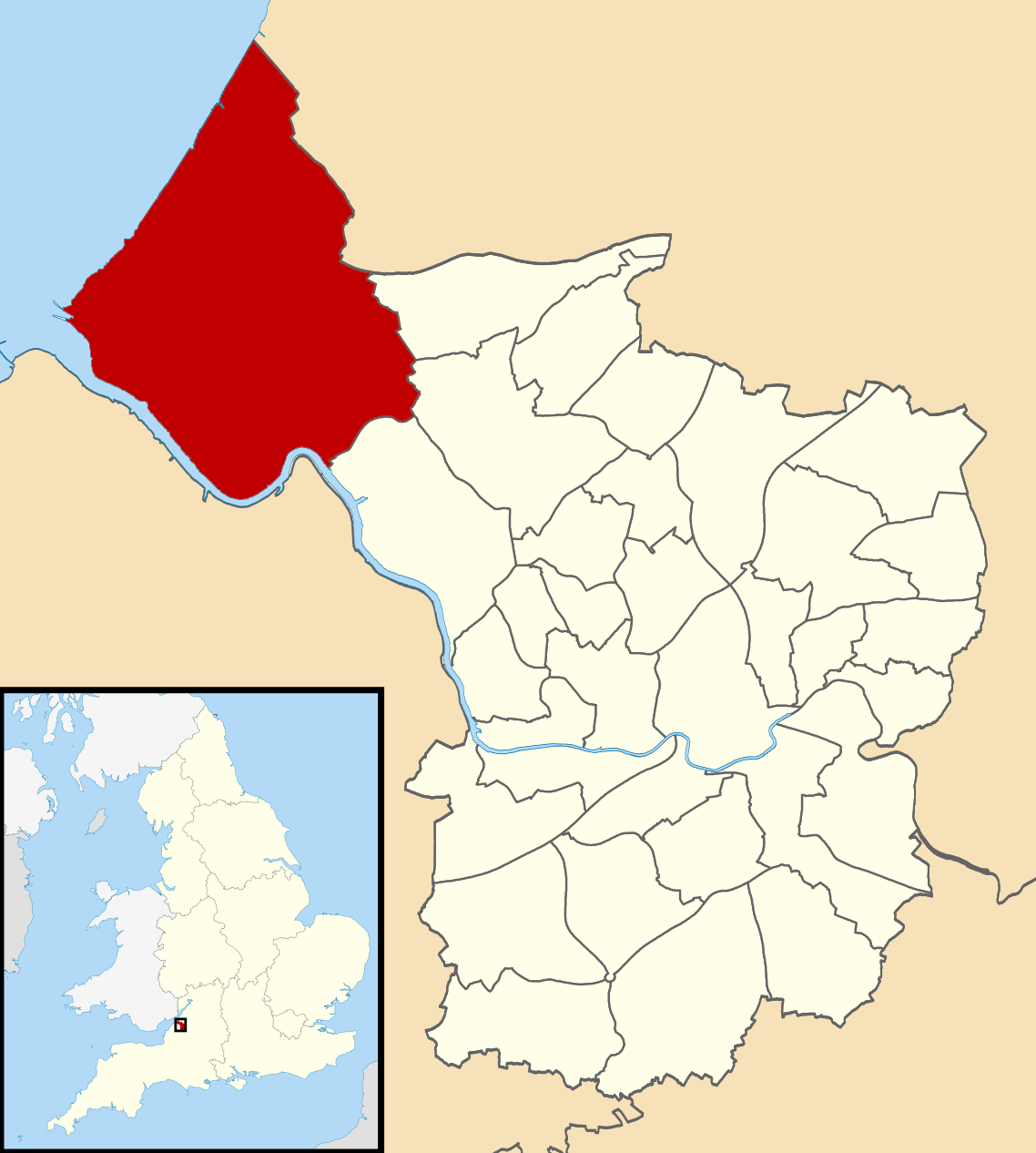
- Ward boundaries since 2016.
- County: Bristol
- Population: 22,166
- Electorate: 15,909

Current ward
- Created: 2016
- Councillor: Don Alexander (Labour)
- Councillor: Zoë Peat (Liberal Democrats)
- Councillor: Thomas Blenkinsop (Labour)
- UK Parliament constituency: Bristol North West

Avonmouth and Lawrence Weston is an electoral ward in Bristol, England. It is represented by three members on Bristol City Council which, following the 2024 local elections, are Don Alexander and Tom Blenkinsop of the Labour Party and Zoë Peat of the Liberal Democrats, following the latter's defection from the Labour Party to the Liberal Democrats in May 2026.

== Area Profile ==
For elections to the Parliament of the United Kingdom, Avonmouth and Lawrence Weston is in Bristol North West constituency.
