= Blaise Castle Estate =

Folly built in 1766 near Henbury in Bristol, England

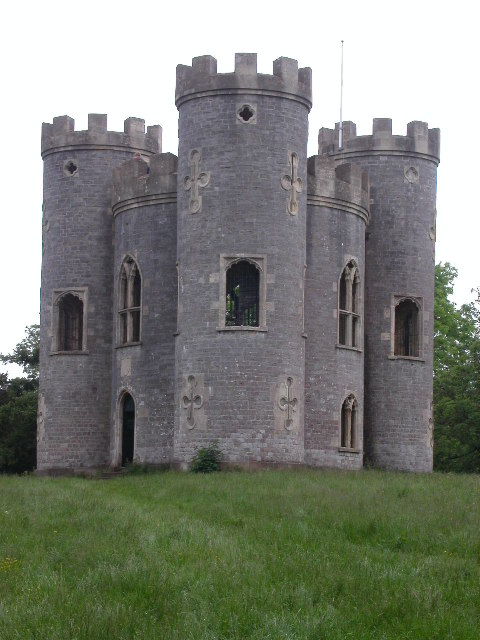
- The folly castle

- Location within Bristol
- 51.504°N 2.632°W
- Location: Bristol, England

History
- Built for: John Harford (Blaise Castle House)

Site notes
- Architect: William Paty (Blaise Castle House)
- Owner: Bristol City Council

Listed Building – Grade II*
- Official name: Blaise Castle
- Designated: 8 January 1959
- Reference no.: 1208115

Listed Building – Grade II*
- Official name: Blaise Castle House and attached wall
- Designated: 8 January 1959
- Reference no.: 1279500

Scheduled monument
- Official name: Blaise Castle and Hamlet
- Designated: 15 May 1987
- Reference no.: 1001426

Listed Building – Grade II
- Official name: Orangery to Blaise Castle House
- Designated: 8 January 1959
- Reference no.: 1293345

Listed Building – Grade II*
- Official name: Model dairy approximately 60 metres east of Blaise Castle House
- Designated: 8 January 1959
- Reference no.: 1293355

Blaise Castle Estate is a public park near Henbury in Bristol, England. The estate includes Blaise Castle House, a Grade II* listed 18th-century mansion house; Blaise Castle, a Grade II* listed folly built in 1766; and other listed ancillary buildings including an orangery and dairy. Along with Blaise Hamlet, a group of nine small cottages around a green built in 1811 for retired employees, and various subsidiary buildings, the parkland is listed Grade II* on the Register of Historic Parks and Gardens.

The site has signs of occupation during the Neolithic, Bronze Age, Iron Age and Roman periods. After the Dissolution of the Monasteries the site was sold. In 1766 Thomas Farr commissioned Robert Mylne to build the sham castle in Gothic Revival style. After Farr's bankruptcy, the estate was sold several times until purchased by John Scandrett Harford, who demolished the previous dwelling in 1789 and built the Neoclassical Blaise Castle House. His son, also named John Scandrett Harford, continued with the development of the buildings and estate, which his family occupied until 1926. The park was laid out by Humphry Repton in the early 19th century.

The estate is now owned by Bristol City Council. The house is run as a museum by the Bristol City Museum and Art Gallery and holds a variety of collections. The Picture Room, added in the 1830s, is hung with paintings, mostly of the 19th century. There are selections on display from Bristol Museum's 10,000 items of historic costume, and of toys from the 18th century to the 1980s.

== Early history ==
Flint fragments show Blaise Castle Estate was probably first inhabited by Neolithic farmers. There is more definitive evidence for Bronze Age, Iron Age and Roman activity through the distinctive hill-forts in the area and other archaeological finds. The value of this historic landscape was recognised when it became a scheduled monument in 1982.

The land was granted to the Bishop of Worcester as part of the Kingdom of Mercia before the Norman conquest. During this time, when it was the property of the church, the estate had a chapel dedicated to Saint Blaise, which has given the estate its name. Following the Dissolution of the Monasteries, the estate was granted to Ralph Sadler who let it to tenants until 1675. A large part of the estate was bought by Sir Samuel Astry of Henbury.

The chapel's last ruins were removed in 1707.

== Blaise Castle House ==
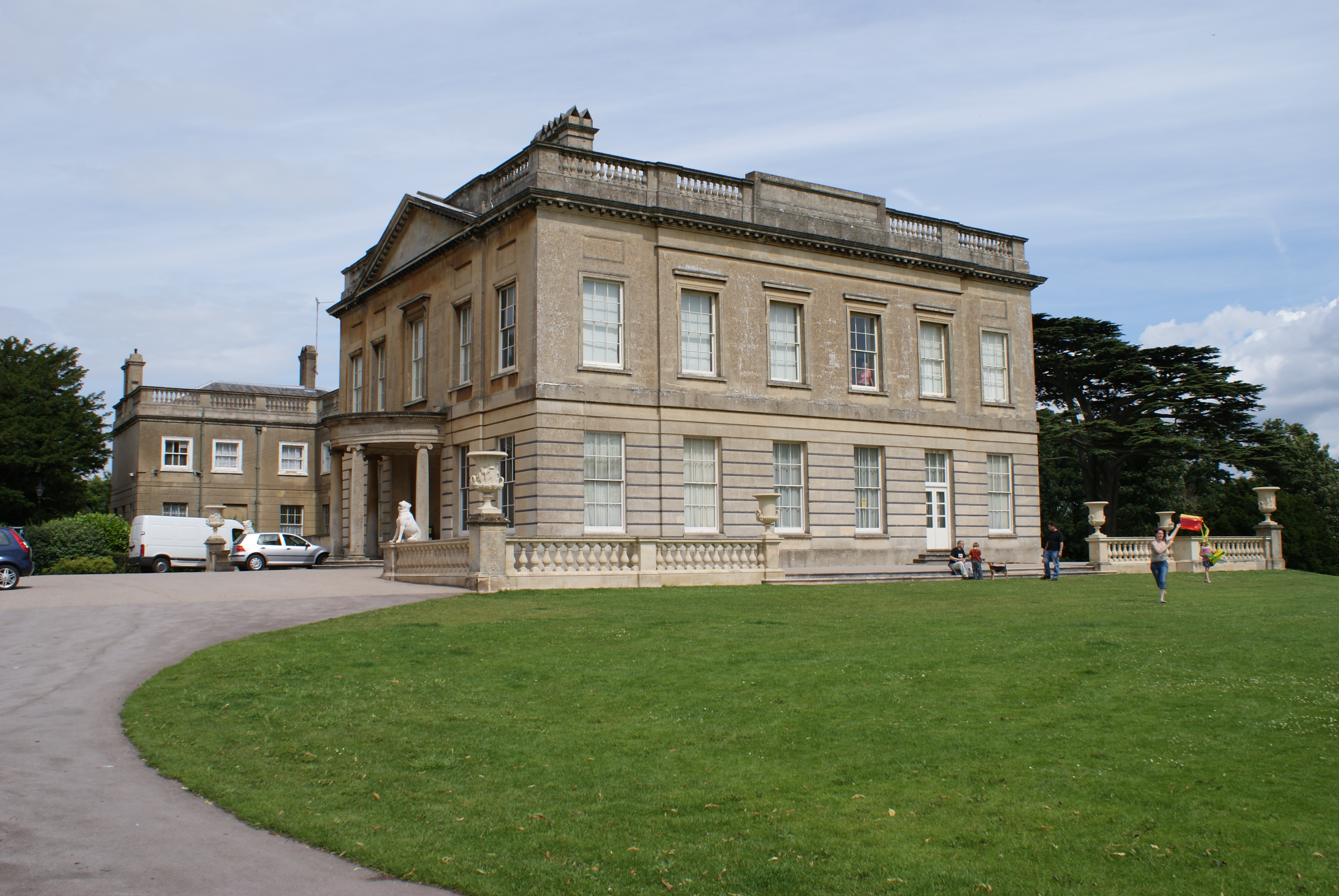
The mansion house at Blaise Castle Estate

In the later 18th century, the estate was owned by a sugar merchant and investor in the Atlantic slave trade, Thomas Farr, who bought it from Astry's descendants in 1762; he built the sham castle. Farr went bankrupt when ships he owned were blockaded during the American Revolutionary War, and the estate was bought in 1778 by Denham Skeate, a lawyer from Bath. Eleven years later he sold it to John Harford, a wealthy Bristol merchant and banker, who demolished the old house in 1789 and had the present two-storey Neoclassical Blaise Castle House built in 1796–1798, designed by William Paty. It is a square stone block with adjoining domestic offices which are faced with stucco. The north west entrance front has five bays with a central semicircular projecting porch with Ionic columns. It is a Grade II* listed building, though described by Simon Jenkins as "solid, simple and unexciting". John Nash added a connected conservatory or orangery around 1805 or 1806, and in 1832–1833, Charles Robert Cockerell designed the Picture Room for Harford's son, John Scandrett Harford, who had inherited the estate after his father's death in 1812. The Picture Room extends into a portico which has six Ionic columns. This now houses a display of paintings from the Bristol City Museum and Art Gallery. The hall has bas-relief medallions by Bertel Thorvaldsen.

The elder Harford also had Blaise Hamlet built to house his servants and tenants, to designs of Nash and George Repton, in 1811. The estate was sold to Bristol City Council in 1926, to preserve it from development. During World War II the house was occupied by the armed forces. A branch of the Bristol City Museum and Art Gallery since 1949, Blaise Castle House now features collections relating to household items in addition to its period interior decoration. Galleries have displays of historic domestic equipment used for lighting, cooking, cleaning, washing, including a display of toilets.

== Blaise Castle ==
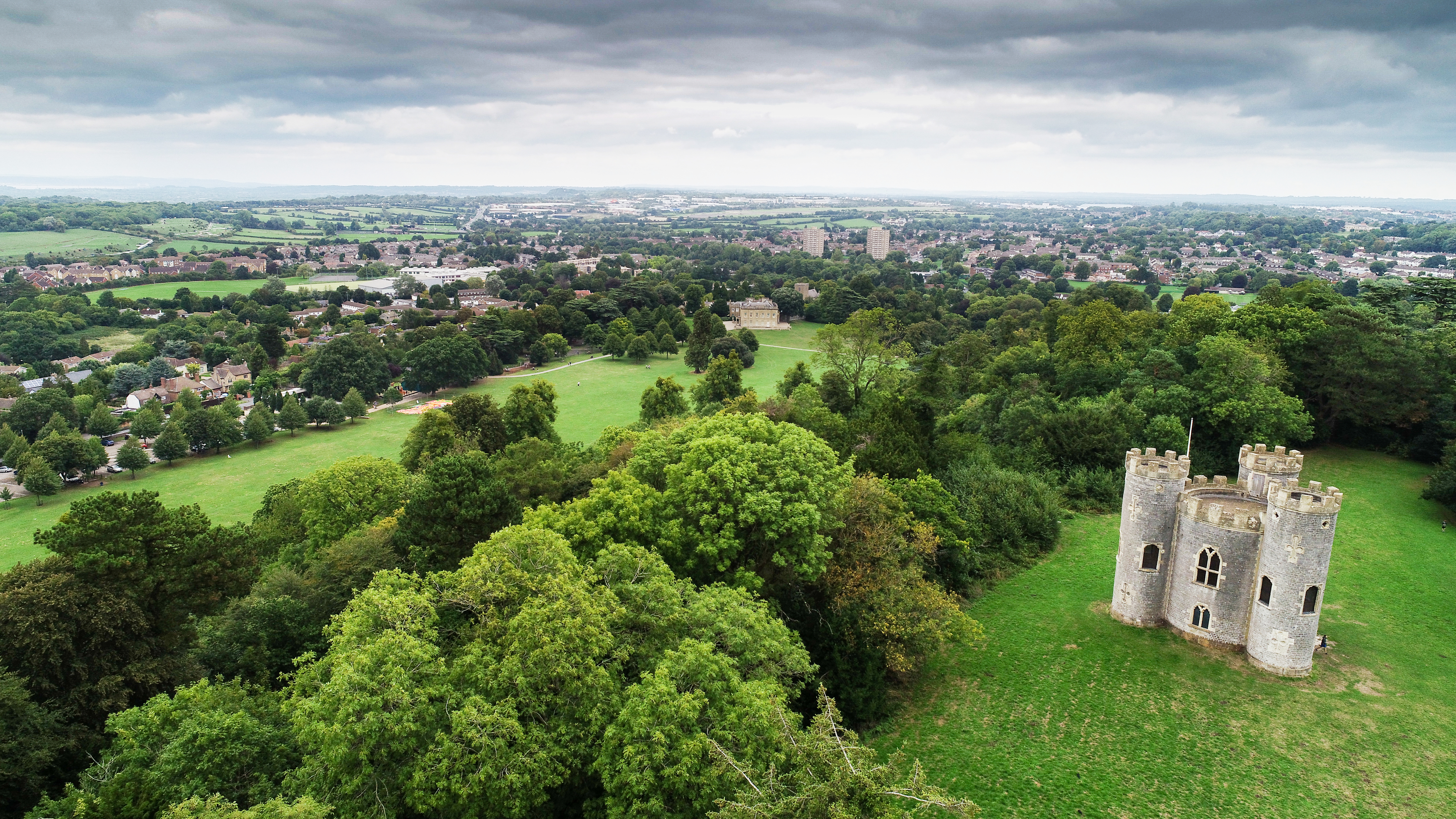
Aerial view of Blaise Castle

On a hill above the gorge is a sham castle in Gothic Revival style overlooking Bristol, Avonmouth and the Avon Gorge, with views across to South Wales on a clear day. It was built in 1766, by Robert Mylne, on the site of a chapel dedicated to Saint Blaise. The folly is reputed to have cost £3,000. The circular building is built of local ashlar stone with limestone dressings. It has three turrets with crenellated parapets.

Denham Skeate opened the site to the public. It was open to paying visitors and a popular attraction from the first with excellent views on a clear day. Vessels could be seen passing on the River Avon from the castle, and the hills and mountains of Wales were visible beyond the river. The castle was mentioned - as Blaize Castle - by Jane Austen in her novel Northanger Abbey. John Thorpe, planning a trip to Bristol with Catherine Morland and her brother, ironically describes the castle as "the finest place in England – worth going fifty miles at any time to see as well as lying about its having towers and galleries “by the dozen” in his attempt to persuade Catherine.

It was inhabited into the 20th century and was elaborately decorated internally. It is a Grade II* listed building and was restored in 1957.

== Blaise Hamlet ==
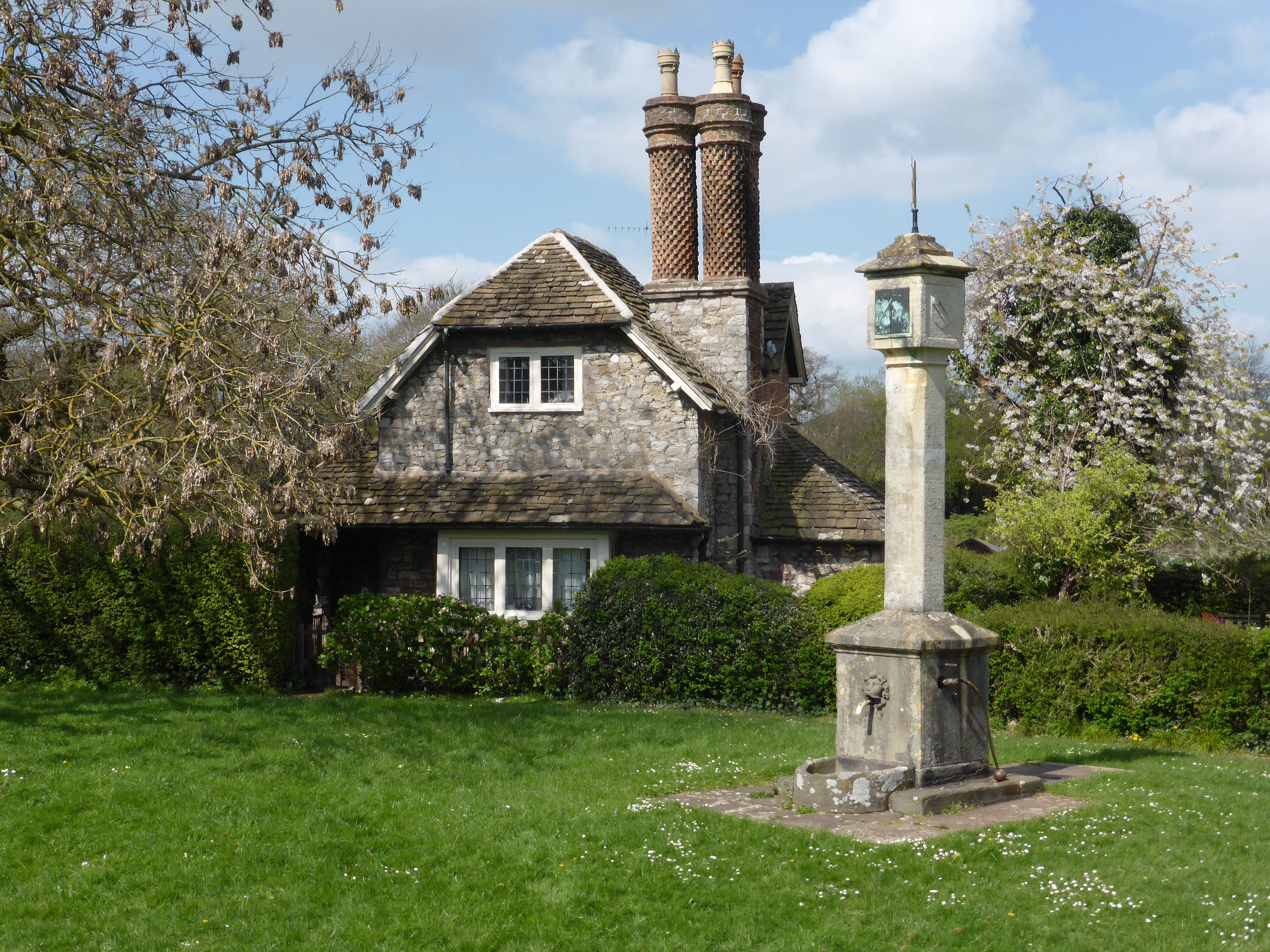
Dial Cottage at Blaise Hamlet

Blaise Hamlet is a hamlet composed of a group of nine small cottages around a green. It was originally within the estate grounds, but is now separated from the rest of the site by a road. All the cottages, and the sundial on the green are Grade I listed buildings. Nikolaus Pevsner described Blaise Hamlet as "the ne plus ultra of picturesque layout and design." Blaise Hamlet was built around 1811 for Harford's retired employees.

The hamlet was designed by John Nash, master of the picturesque style. He had worked for Harford on other buildings. The hamlet is the first fully realised exemplar of the garden suburb and was the inspiration for virtually all garden suburbs that followed. The cottages are all unique and include brick chimneys and dormer windows with some having thatched roofs. They are examples of the picturesque, an aesthetic ideal introduced into English cultural debate in 1782 by William Gilpin. An oval path links the cottages and encircles the village green, which has a sundial at its centre. The gardens are planted in a Victorian cottage garden style.

== Parkland ==
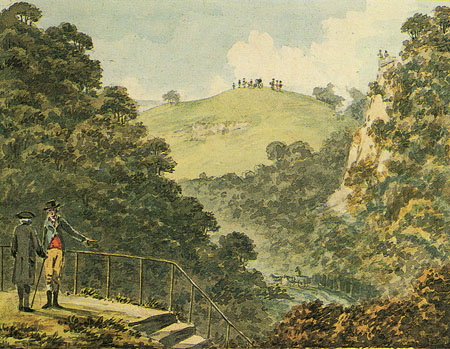
Sir Humphrey Repton: "View of the approach, from the Red Book for Blaise Castle" (1796)

The castle and its 650 acres (2.6 km^{2}) of parkland are now open to the public. Along with Blaise Hamlet, the parkland is listed Grade II* on the Register of Historic Parks and Gardens.

The grounds were laid out by Humphry Repton (1752–1818), a leading landscape gardener. Parts of Repton's designs still exist, notably the carriage drive which winds its way from the house, sections of which follow the original route. In addition to the conservatory and the almshouses in Blaise Hamlet, Nash built the limestone dairy in 1802.

The grounds include a gorge cut by the Hazel Brook through Bristol's limestone. The gorge has a number of landscape features, including Goram's Chair, a limestone outcrop often used by climbers, and Lover's Leap and Potter's Point, two panoramic viewing spots. Stratford Mill was moved from West Harptree and re-erected within the gorge after Chew Valley Lake was flooded to form a reservoir. Ongoing renovations started in 2004 of the mill, settling ponds and associated estate pathways. At the gorge's southern end, Hazel Brook joins the River Trym, which continues its flow towards Sea Mills. Other features within the estate include two pools: the Giant's Soapdish and the Penny Well, and two caves: the Robber's Cave and the Butcher's Cave.

Kings Weston Hill, to the west of the castle, also forms the part of the estate which is close to Kings Weston Roman Villa.

== See also ==
- Grade II* listed buildings in Bristol

== Bibliography ==
- Cooke, Robert (1957). West Country Houses. Batsford.
- Eveleigh, David (1987). A Popular Retreat: Blaise Castle and House Estate. City of Bristol. ISBN 978-0-900199-35-6.
- Foyle, Andrew (2004). Bristol (Pevsner Architectural Guides: City Guides). Yale University Press. ISBN 978-0-300-10442-4.
- Jenkins, Simon (2003). England's Thousand Best Houses. Allen Lane. ISBN 978-0-7139-9596-1.
- Wenner, Barbara Britton (2016). Prospect and Refuge in the Landscape of Jane Austen. Routledge. ISBN 978-1-351-90823-8.
- Richmond, Joan M (2015) Nine Letters from an Artist The Families of William Gillard, Porphyrogenitus. ISBN 978-1-871328-19-6.
