= St Mary Magdalene, Stoke Bishop =

Church in Stoke Bishop, Bristol

Coordinates: 51.4768°N 2.6355°W

Church of St Mary Magdalene
- Church of St Mary Magdalene, Stoke Bishop
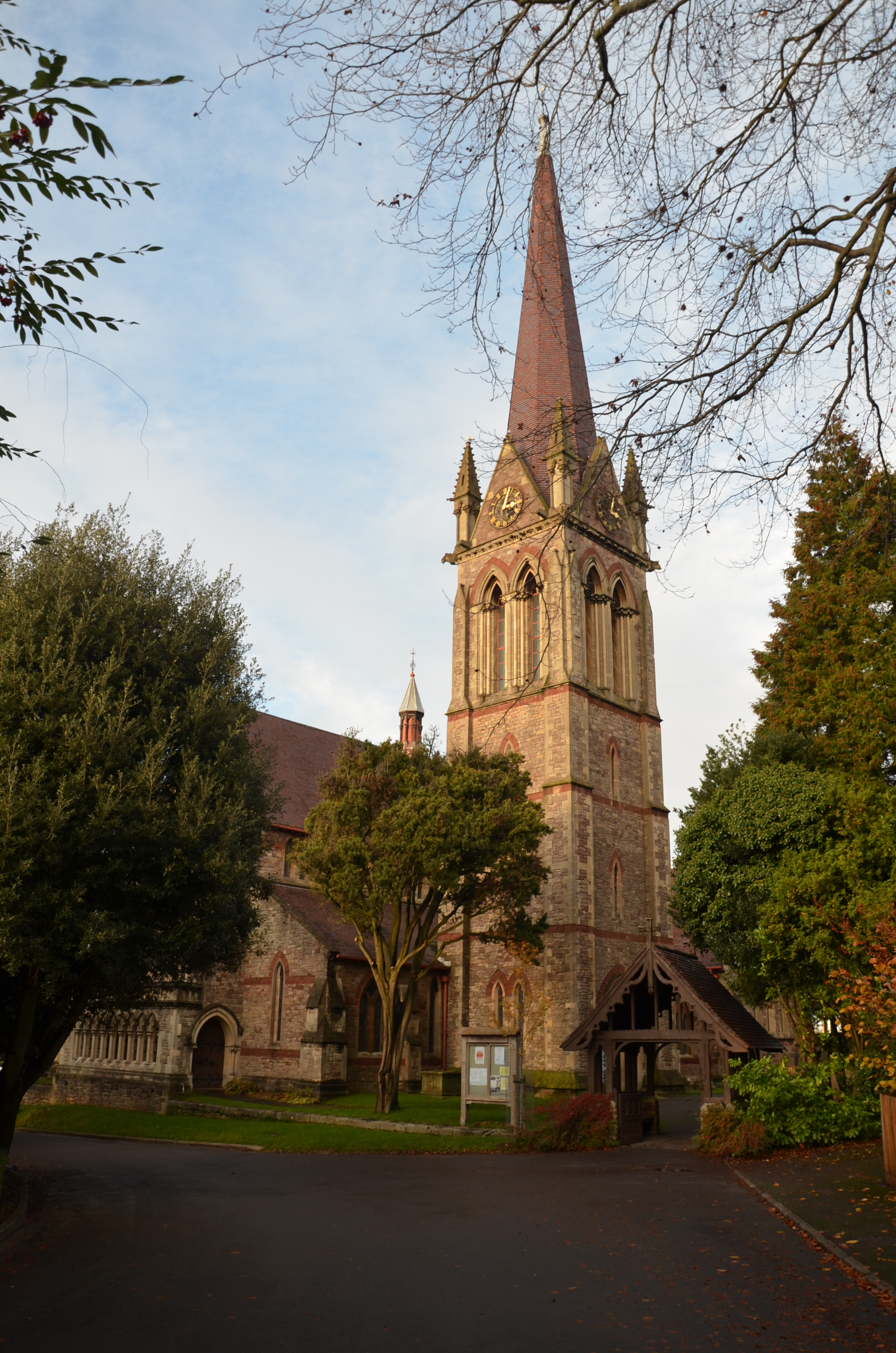
- Church of St Mary Magdalene
- Church of St Mary Magdalene
- Location: Stoke Bishop, Bristol
- Country: England
- Denomination: Anglican

History
- Founded: 1858
- Founder(s): David Wright, William Baker
- Dedicated: 1860

Architecture
- Architect: John Norton
- Style: Gothic Revival
- Years built: 1858–1883

Specifications
- Height: 48 metres (157 ft)

Administration
- Diocese: Diocese of Bristol
- Parish: Stoke Bishop

Clergy
- Priest: Jema Ball

The Church of St Mary Magdalene is an Anglican church located in Stoke Bishop, Bristol, which serves as the parish church of Stoke Bishop, and its subdivision of Sneyd Park. Designed by John Norton, it is a Grade II listed building.

== History ==
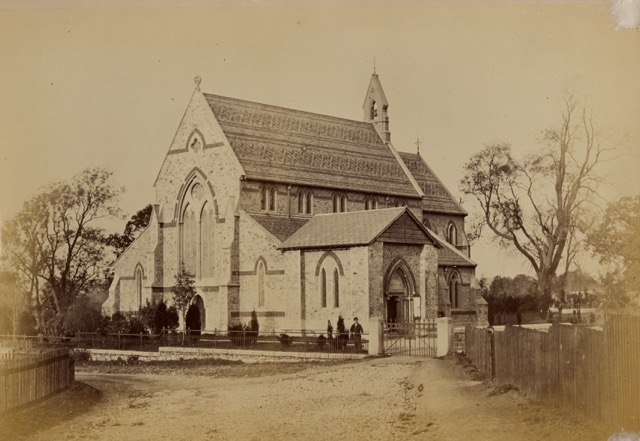
The church in 1864, before the construction of the spire

Construction of the church began on 5 August 1858 due to an increase in population in Stoke Bishop, and because the old parish church, located Westbury-on-Trym, was too far for the residents, and was built on land owned by William Baker, a local builder. On 13 March 1860, parts of the chancel, aisles, and the base of the spire were completed. The church was designed by John Norton, a London architect who went on to design Tyntesfield House, outside Bristol, and cost £15,000. In 1871 the nave was extended, the west porch added, and the spire was erected. Construction of the spire drew to a halt after a violent storm caused it to collapse. It was quickly rebuilt and by 1872 bells were placed in the spire. In 1883 the clock was added, followed by a greater chancel and a south aisle chapel. It became parish church in 1861. On 4 March 1977, it was designated a Grade II Listed building.

== Architecture ==
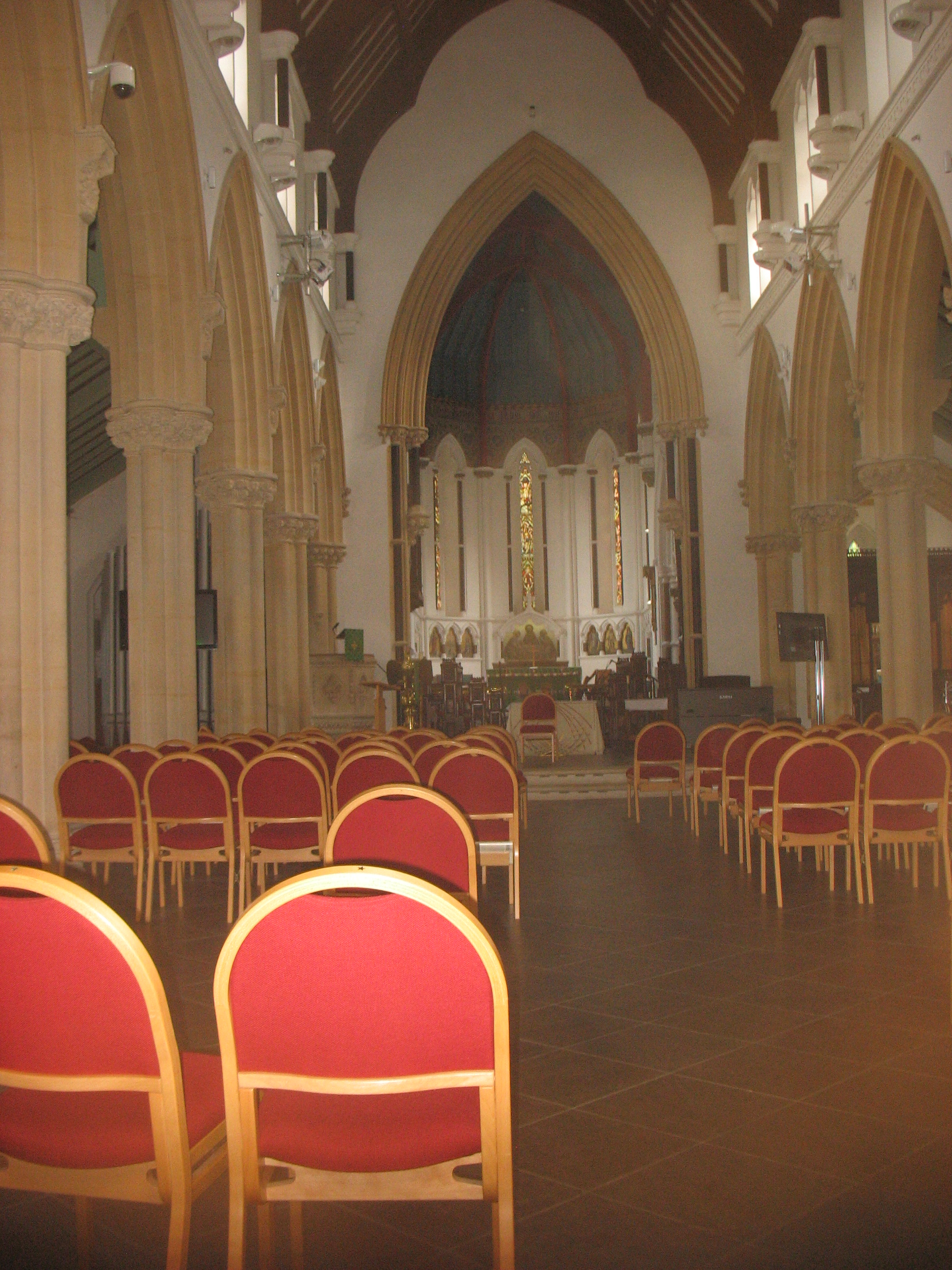
The interior of the church

The church was designed by John Norton following a Gothic Revival style. The spire is 48 metres (157 ft) tall and built in 1872. Made of stone, it features three stages and is supported by heavy buttresses. The nave has 5 bays and is separated from the aisles by a series of columns, and the interior features a series of wooden carvings. The altar features a series of reredos, which narrate and depict the life of Saint Mary Magdalene. The church’s stained glass windows were designed by Clayton & Bell, and some represent various important families of Bristol. The church’s cemetery is located in the courtyard.
