= Stoke Bishop =

Suburb of Bristol, England

Coordinates: 51.48°N 2.63°W

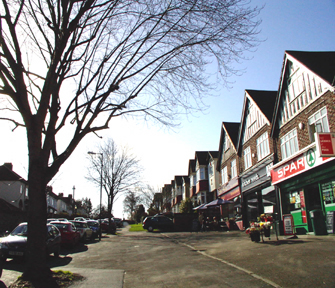
- Druid Hill shops

- Location within Bristol
- OS grid reference: ST563759
- Unitary authority: Bristol
- Ceremonial county: Bristol
- Region: South West
- Country: England
- Sovereign state: United Kingdom
- Post town: BRISTOL
- Postcode district: BS9
- Dialling code: 0117
- Police: Avon and Somerset
- Fire: Avon
- Ambulance: South Western
- UK Parliament: Bristol North West

Stoke Bishop is a suburb and ecclesiastical parish in the north-west of Bristol, England, of which Sneyd Park is a subdivision. Bordered by The Downs, the River Avon and the River Trym, it is located between the suburbs of Westbury-on-Trym and Sea Mills. Although relatively low, Stoke Bishop's population has significantly increased in recent years due to the infilling of former school and company playing fields. It also increases greatly in term time because of the influx of students to the large campus of Bristol University halls of residence situated on the edge of The Downs.

Within Stoke Bishop are the parish church of St Mary Magdalene (CofE); a primary school, Stoke Bishop C of E Primary, sometimes called Cedar Park, because of its location; and a village hall, which is used for a variety of activities from meetings of a local history group to dog training and karate. Next to the primary school is Bristol Croquet Club, which has had many influential international members. Stoke Bishop Cricket Club play at Coombe Dingle Sports Complex. The cricket club has two senior men's XIs and a junior section composed of U9, U11, U13, U15 and U17 teams.

== History ==
There was a Roman harbour, Portus Abonae (port on the Avon), at the then deeper and much more extensive tidal mouth of the River Trym. Its origin was military, but by the early second century a civilian town had been established on the Stoke Bishop side of the river. Important enough to feature simply as Abona in the 3rd-century Antonine Itinerary, which documents towns and distances in the Roman empire, it was connected with Bath by a road that crossed The Downs and ran down to the harbour along what is still a right of way known as Mariners' Path. Archaeological excavations have found evidence of the street pattern and shops within the town, also cemeteries outside it in what were then the grounds of Nazareth House. The fenced-off foundations of a small building have been preserved at the Portway entrance of Roman Way. No evidence of settlement later than the Roman period has been found.

The land of Stoke Bishop was granted to the Bishop of Worcester by King Offa of Mercia in the 790s and remained a Worcester ecclesiastical estate until the Reformation. Confiscated by Henry VIII, it then passed into private hands. What is now Sneyd Park was sold as a separate Sneed Park estate in the mid-17th century. Apart from the two estate mansions and small adjoining parks, the area remained agricultural until the 19th century.

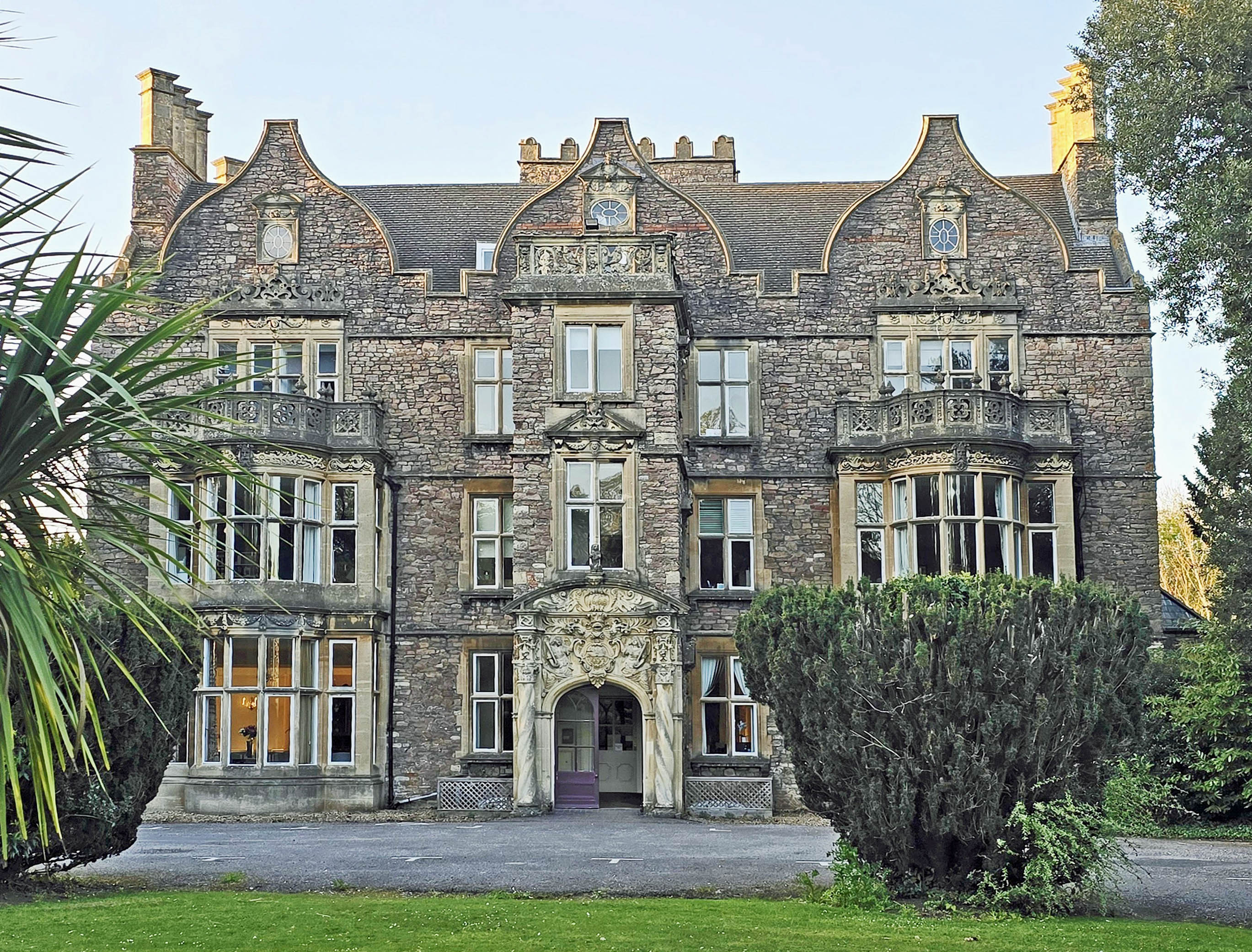
Stoke House

Stoke House, the Stoke Bishop manor house, was built in 1669 for Sir Robert Cann, Member of Parliament, Mayor of Bristol and Merchant Venturer. A Grade II* listed building, it is currently a theological college known as Trinity College, Bristol.

Sneed Park was latterly the estate of Sir George White. The mansion, renamed Nazareth House when it was sold by his heirs in the 1920s, became a Roman Catholic Orphanage and was demolished in 1972. Bombs fell on Roman Way during the Second World War, destroying one house completely.

=== Residential development ===
In the course of the 19th century land on both Stoke Bishop and Sneyd Park estates was increasingly sold off to wealthy Bristolians to construct large villas in substantial grounds. A separate parish of Stoke Bishop was created, including Sneyd Park, with the present parish church consecrated in 1860; a grand church and village hall was completed in 1885.

Previously in Gloucestershire, the area was absorbed into the City of Bristol in 1904. In the inter-war period the remaining farmland was sold off, streets of detached and semi-detached houses were built, and parades of shops were constructed on Shirehampton Road (Trymwood Parade) and at the bottom of Druid Hill.

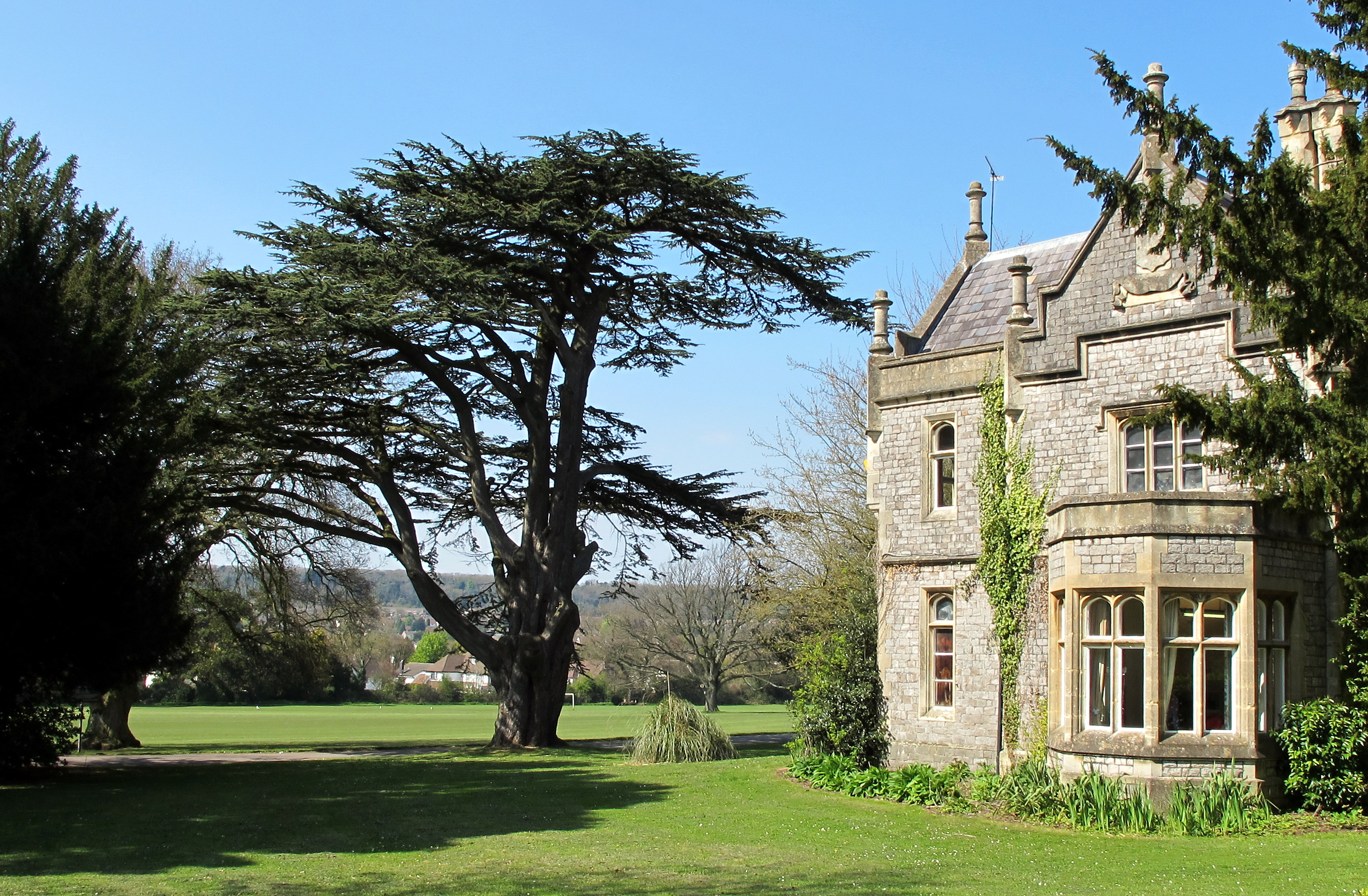
Stoke Lodge

Significant buildings constructed during this residential expansion include Stoke Lodge, a Grade II listed building built in 1836, which has been owned by Bristol City Council and held as educational land since 1947. The Holmes in Stoke Park Road, a large 'Arts and Crafts' style house built in 1879, was used as a base for US Army generals during the planning of the 1944 Normandy landings. Since 2005 it has been home to the University of Bristol Botanic Garden.

An association with Druids arose from a megalithic monument, apparently the remains of a burial chamber, discovered in 1811 off what is now Druid Hill. Druid Stoke House, a Grade II listed building west of Druid Hill, dates from the turn of the 19th century. The Druid Stoke area was developed in the grounds of Druid Stoke House in the 1930s.

In the 1930s Jared and Jethro Stride built "one-off luxury homes on plots they had bought" in Sneyd Park and Stoke Bishop. The tradition was carried on by Jared's sons Arthur and Frederick, and later into the 1960s by their sons Leslie and Raymond. The 'Stride brothers' specialised in constructing individual style homes with the emphasis on location, finish and design. Each house was built to a unique design – no two are the same – and well fitted out with oak floors, wood-panelled rooms and central heating. These "high quality dwellings" are still marketed today as classic 'Stride houses'.

=== 21st century ===
In 2011, playing fields on most of the Stoke Lodge grounds were leased long-term to Cotham School. The school erected fences around most of the site, to which local residents and Bristol City Council objected, leading to a 14 year dispute. In 2023, the Stoke Lodge grounds were registered as a village green under the Commons Act 2006, preventing access being restricted, and the fences were removed. The village green designation was overturned at a judicial review in 2025.

== Electoral ward ==
Stoke Bishop
- ward Bristol City Council
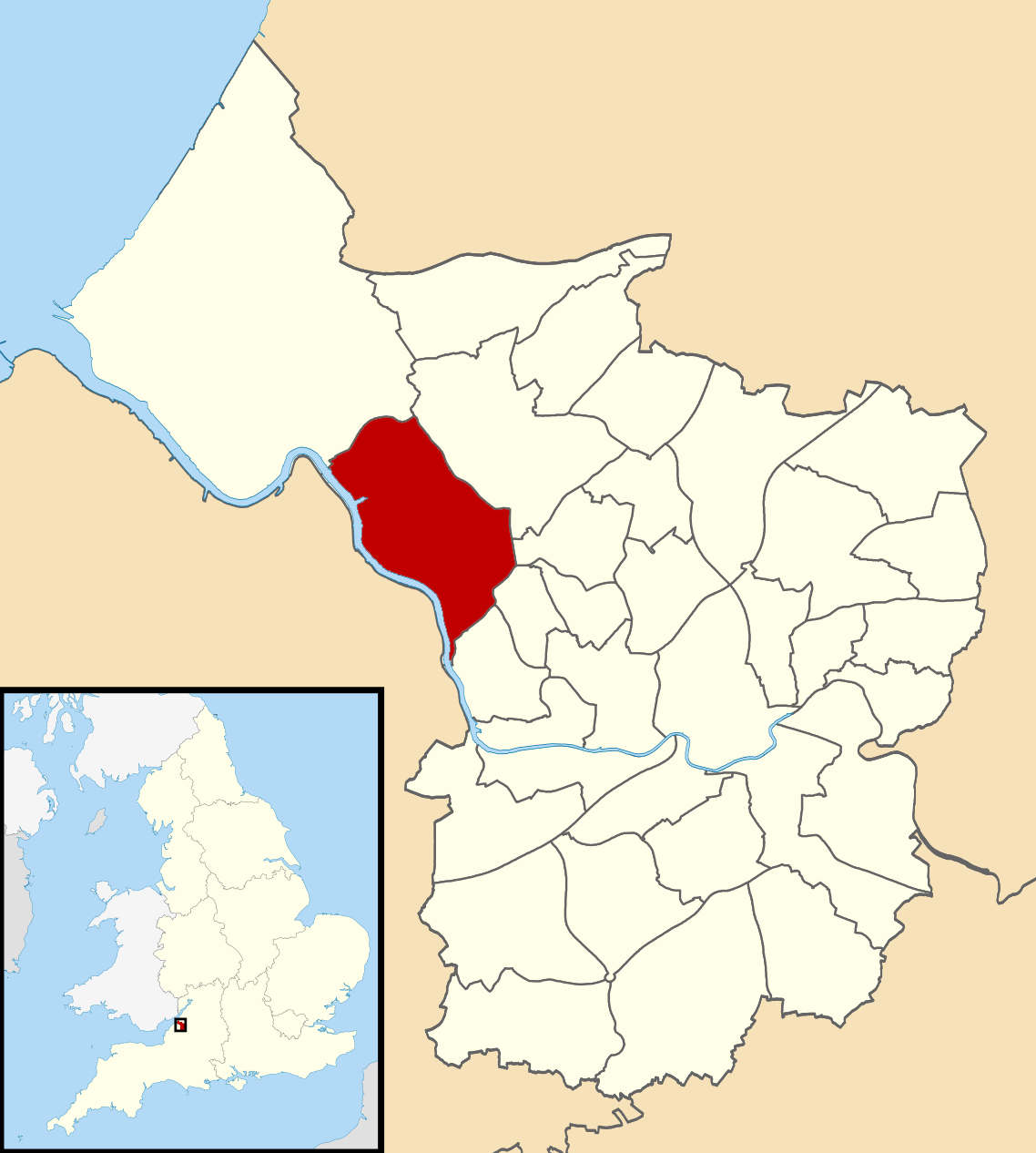
- Ward boundaries since 2016.
- County: Bristol
- Population: 13,067
- Electorate: 8,316

Current ward
- Created: 1980
- Councillor: John Goulandris (Conservative)
- Councillor: Henry Michallat (Conservative)
- UK Parliament constituency: Bristol North West

Stoke Bishop electoral ward created in 1980, includes Sneyd Park, much of The Downs and the Avon Gorge, and since 2016 most of Sea Mills. The ward is represented by two members on Bristol City Council, which as of 2024 are John Goulandris and Henry Michallat, both Conservatives. Henry Michallat was elected Lord Mayor of Bristol for 2025-2026.

== Notable people ==
- Elizabeth Ayton Godwin (1817–1889), hymn writer, religious poet.
- Sir Edward Payson Wills, 1st Baronet ( 1834 – 1910 ) Tobacco Manufacturer and a director of W.D. & H.O. Wills Tobacco Company.
- José Maria de Eça de Queirós (1845–1900), Portuguese novelist who was the Portuguese consul in Bristol from 1879 to 1888.
- Sir George White, 1st Baronet (1854–1916), Tram, motor vehicle and aircraft manufacturer. Managing director of the Bristol Tramways and Carriage Company and founder of the Bristol Aeroplane Company.
