= University of Bristol Botanic Garden =

Botanical garden in Bristol

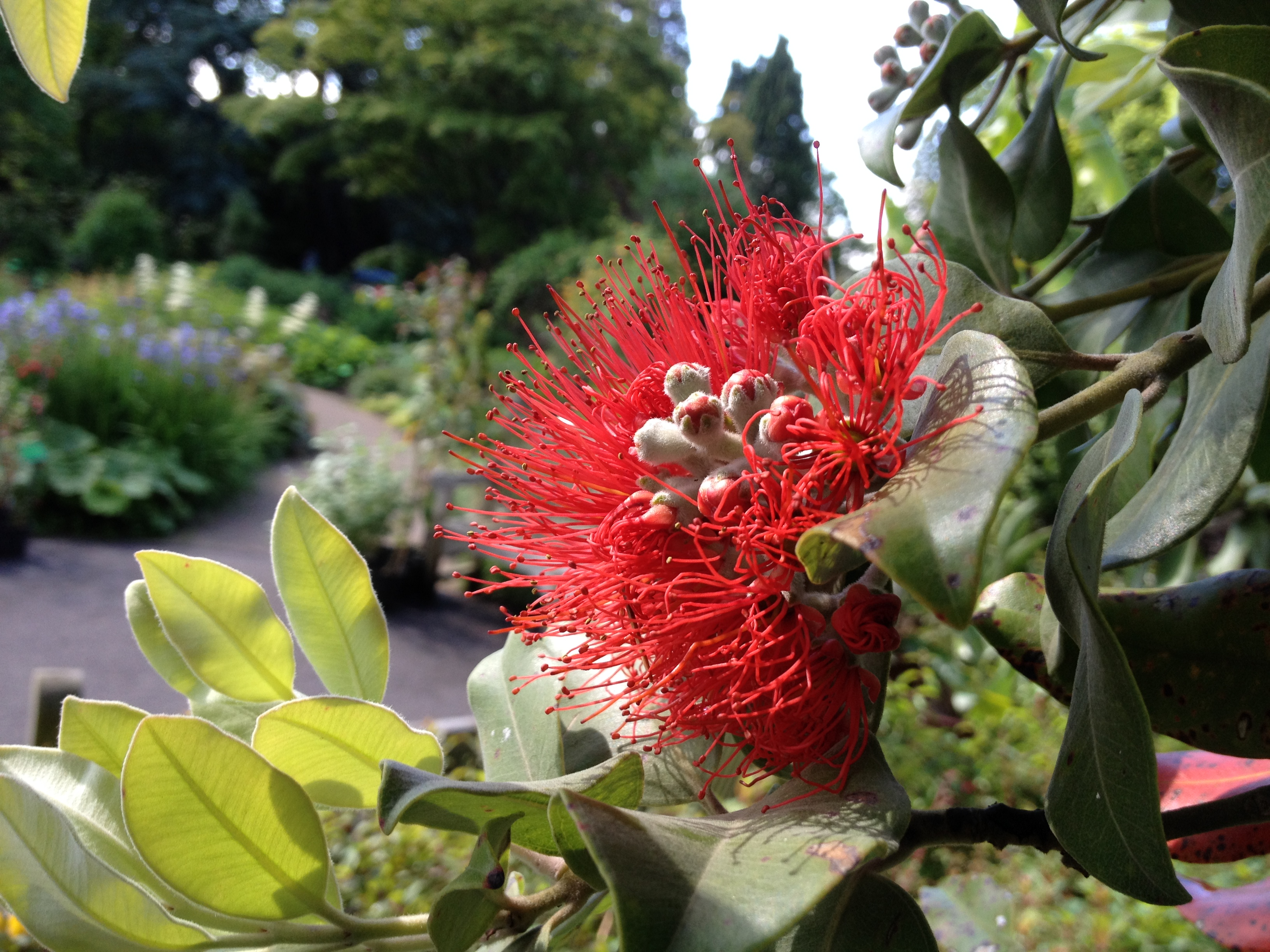
- Metrosideros excelsa displayed as part of the pollination collection

- Location within Bristol
- Type: Botanic Garden
- Location: Bristol, England
- Coordinates: 51.4777°N 2.6258°W
- Area: 1.77 hectares (4.4 acres)
- Operator: University of Bristol

The University of Bristol Botanic Garden is a botanical garden in Bristol, England. The garden moved to its current site in Stoke Bishop in 2005, having previously been at three other sites in the city. The 4,500 species of plants are displayed in collections relating to evolution, Mediterranean, local flora and rare natives and finally useful plants.

== History ==
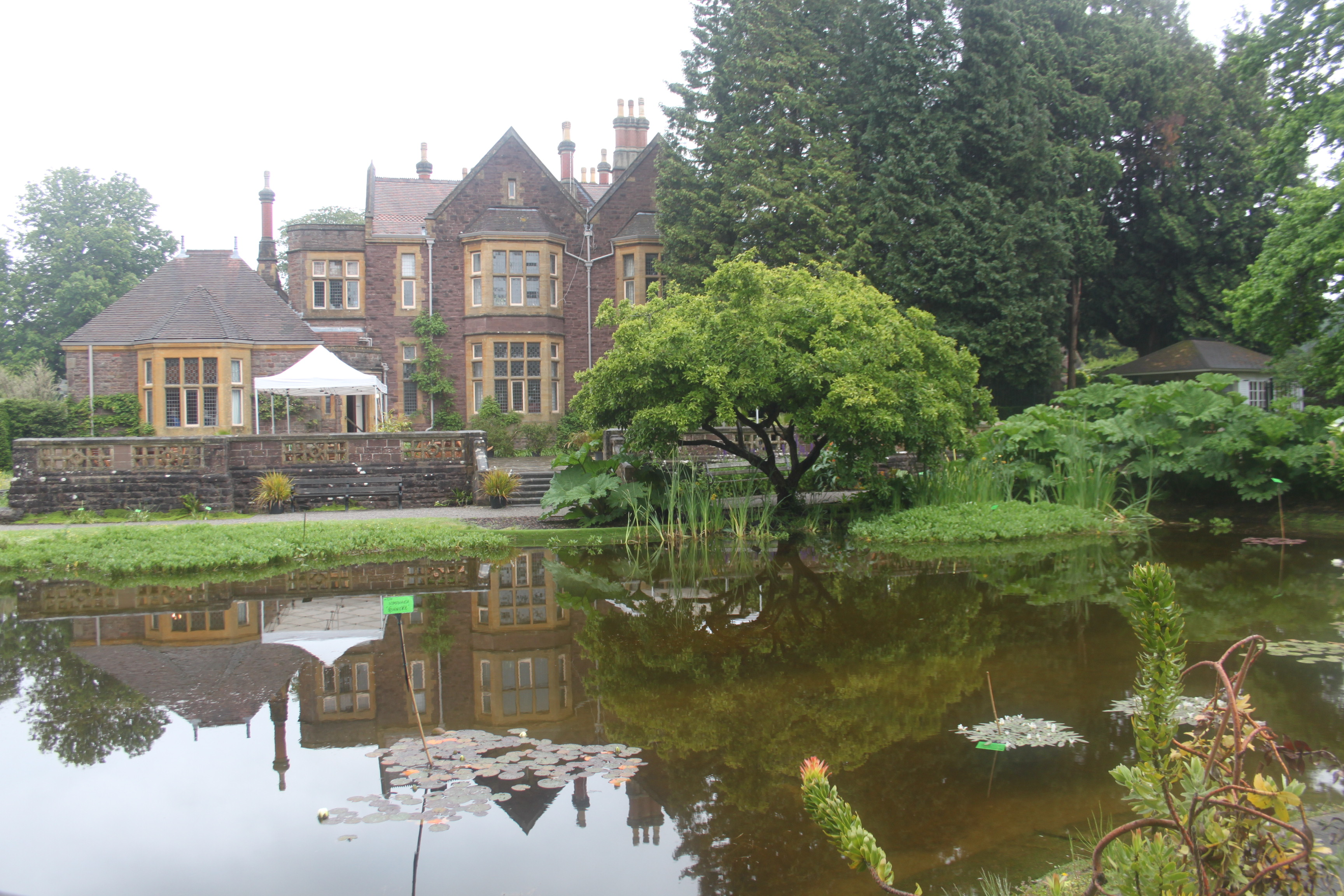
The pool in front of the Holmes

University College, Bristol established a botanic garden in 1882 adjacent to the university college on University Road, near Royal Fort House. It was laid out by Adolf Leipner the lecture in botany at the university college. At some point the garden moved to the Hiatt Baker Garden on Tyndall Avenue.

In 1959 the Tyndall Avenue site of the Botanic Garden was used to build the university's Senate House. The botanic collection was moved to the spacious gardens of Bracken Hill beside North Road, Leigh Woods, near the Clifton Suspension Bridge. The Bracken Hill house and gardens had been established in 1886 by Melville Wills, a noted benefactor to Bristol University.

Bracken Hill house and some of the gardens continued to be used by the plant pathology and other services of the government's National Agricultural Advisory Service (NAAS), advising farmers and growers from Herefordshire and Dorset to Lands End during and after World War II when UK-grown crops were vital to minimise rationing. See, for instance, the cereal and vegetable diseases work of Lawrence Ogilvie at Bracken Hill. The NAAS staff, laboratories and offices had moved there from the Long Ashton Research Station also to the west of Bristol.

In 2005 a new garden was created in the grounds of 'The Holmes', a site in Stoke Bishop opposite Churchill Hall, and a number of the botanic collections, which supported the new themes, were transplanted. The new garden designed by Land Use Consultants advised by Peter Crane, was the first University Botanic Garden built in the UK in the 21st century. The Holmes had been built in 1879 and had a 1.77 hectares (4.4 acres) ornamental garden. It had been used by United States Army staff during the preparations for the Normandy landings during World War II.

Various organised tours and visits are available along with some horticultural talks and courses.

== Displays ==
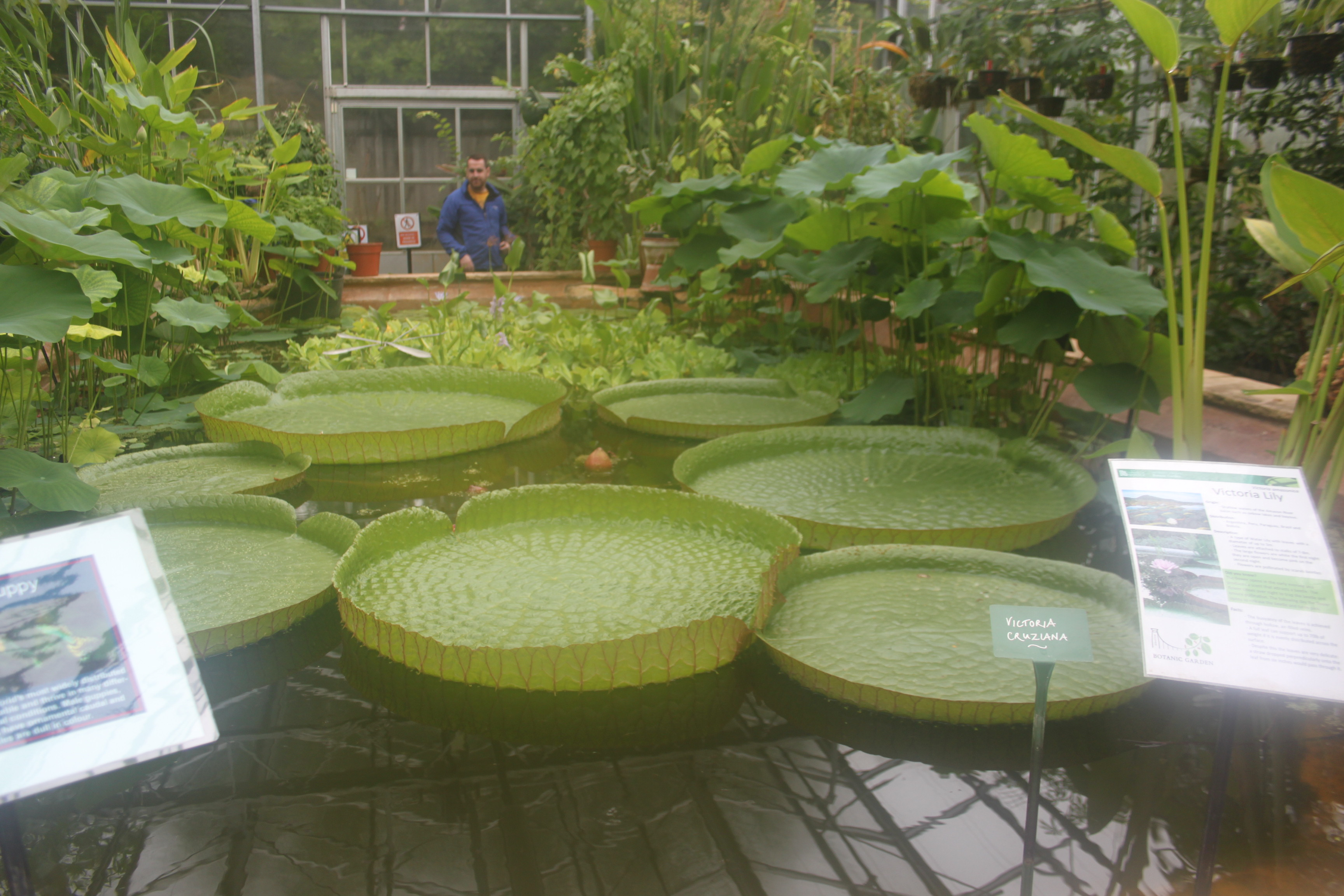
Victoria cruziana in the tropical zone greenhouse

The garden has 640 square metres (6,900 sq ft) of greenhouses divided into cool, warm-temperate, sub-tropic and tropical zones which house plants from the evolution collection. The tropical zone includes a raised pool with aquatic plants including the water lily Victoria cruziana.

The displays include 4500 plant species. These are divided into collections of evolution, Mediterranean, local-flora, rare-native, and finally useful plants. The useful-plant displays include herb gardens with western, Chinese and herbal medicine, including species used in Ayurvedic and Southern African medicine. Displays of plants from the Mediterranean climate region include those from several continents. Plant evolution is illustrated by several displays.

The local-flora and rare-native collection includes the unusual species found in the Avon Gorge, Mendip Hills, Somerset Levels and surrounding areas. These plants include the Bristol Onion, Cheddar Pink and various species of Whitebeam.
