= Elizabeth Ayton Godwin =

British hymnwriter (1817–1889)

Elizabeth Ayton Godwin (4 July 1817 – 26 March 1889) was a Victorian era Christian hymn writer and religious poet. She was born at Thorpe Hamlet, Norfolk, England, 4 July 1817. Her father was William Ellis Etheridge. In 1849, she married Mr. C. Godwin. She published Songs for the weary in 1873; and Songs amidst Daily Life in 1878. Her hymn in common use is "My Saviour, 'mid life's varied scene" (Lent), written while still a girl, and first printed in the Evangelical Magazine, and then in Songs for the Weary, 1865. She died at Stoke Bishop, 26 March 1889.

== Selected works ==
- Songs for the Weary: the School of Sorrow and other Poems (1873)
- Songs Amidst Daily Life (1878)
