= Halls of residence at the University of Bristol =

Halls of residence at the University of Bristol are generally located within three distinct areas of Bristol, the City Centre, Clifton and Stoke Bishop.

== Clifton halls ==
=== Goldney Hall ===
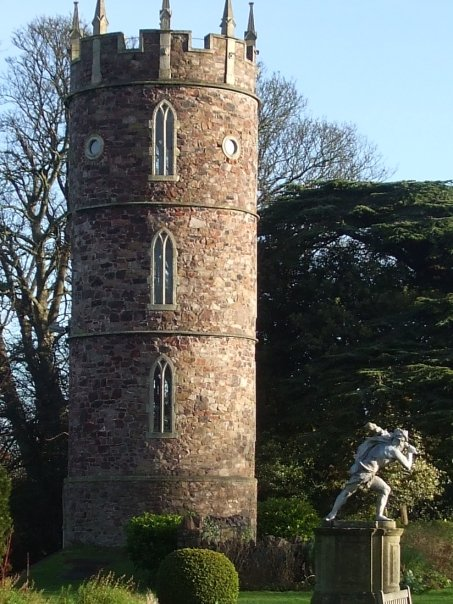
Goldney Hall's gothic tower

Goldney Hall is a self-catered hall situated in Clifton. The Hall has gardens and follies which include an ornamental canal, gothic tower, rotunda, mock Bastion and a subterranean shell-lined grotto. The Hall takes its name from the Goldney family who were a family of wealthy Clifton merchants. Goldney Hall is a popular location for filming with The Chronicles of Narnia, The House of Eliott and Truly, Madly, Deeply as well as the 2002 Christmas episode of Only Fools and Horses, Casualty and Skins being filmed there. Its latest appearance is in the BBC series Sherlock, as the venue for the wedding of John Watson and Mary Morstan in the second episode of the third season, The Sign of Three.

=== Clifton Hill House ===
Clifton Hill House is a catered hall in Clifton. It is a grade I listed building.

=== Manor Hall ===
Manor Hall comprises a number of annexes, each of which is less than a one minute's walk from the main building. The main hall was erected between 1927 and 1932 as a women's hall of residence in the grounds of its present annex Manor House, from which the Hall takes its name.

The main building houses around 150 students, with music room, library, common room, bar, and computer room, all of which are accessible to all of the hall's residents. The hall owes its existence to the generosity of the Wills family, and was designed by the architect Sir George Oatley, who also designed the Wills Memorial Building, and Wills Hall, both of which belong to the university.

This annexe came to the university in 1919, again through the generosity of the Wills family, although it has its roots in the early 18th century. Over the years it has gone through many changes. In the 19th century it was successively the home of two notable scientists, Dr William Budd, F.R.S., who discovered the origins of typhoid, and Professor John Beddoes, F.R.S., a social anthropologist who wrote The Races of Man. Manor House was extensively refurbished by the university in the summers of 1997 and 1998, and officially reopened in April 1999.

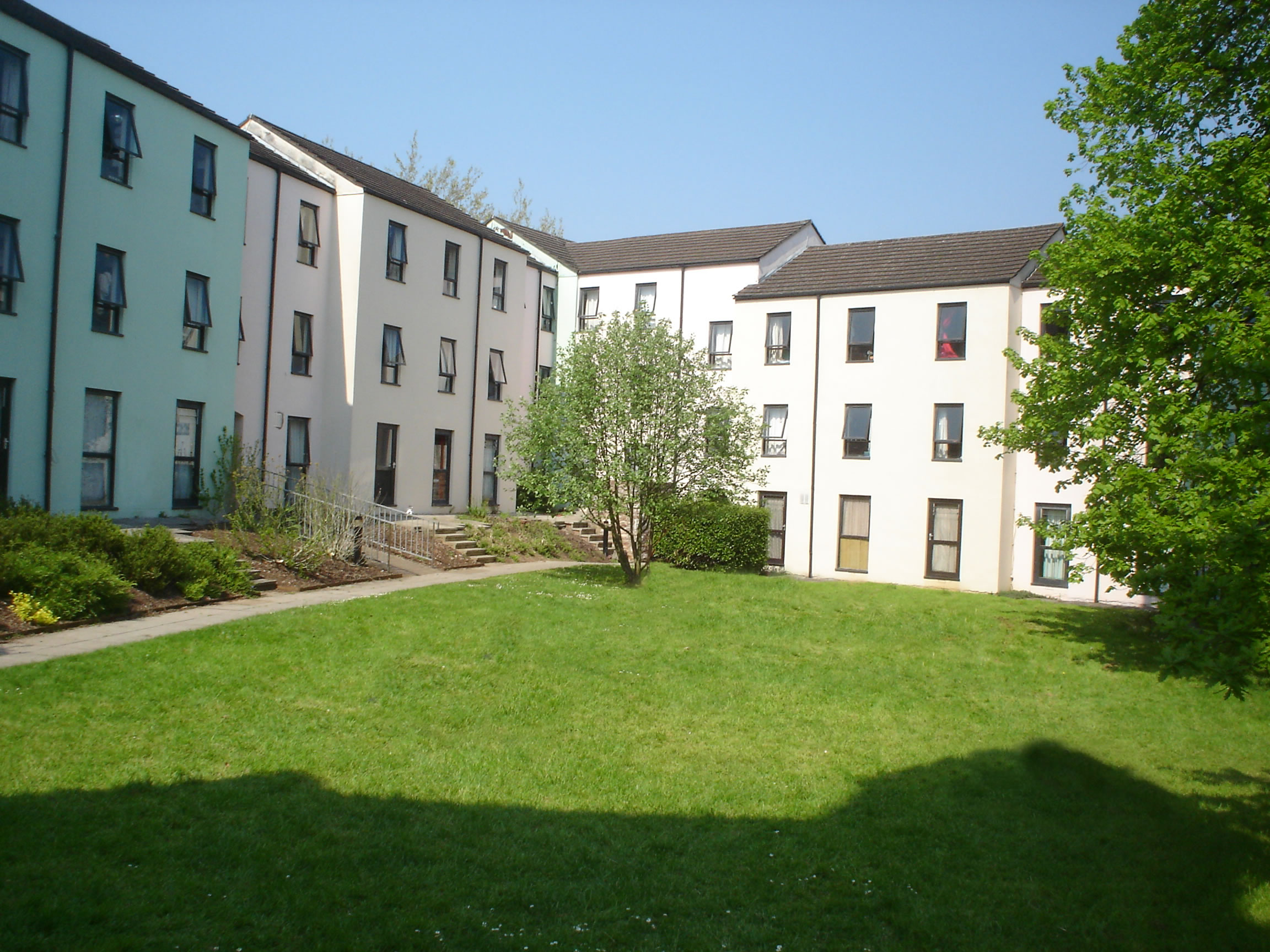
Sinclair House

Richmond House is one of the oldest houses in Clifton, being built between 1701 and 1703. This building has an extensive history; it used to be a boarding school for boys, as well as being the home of the Revd Mr Smith and his large family of maiden daughters, one of whom became one of the first ladies on the city council in Bristol (1920), and one of the first female J.P.s. The building is an English Heritage Grade II listed building.

2, 3 and 4 Tottenham Place are houses which were built in the 1830s. The houses were named after a local resident, Ponsonby Tottenham, a relative of the then Marquess of Ely. They came into the university's possession in the 1940s and 1950s.

Sinclair House is the most modern addition to Manor Hall's annexes, built partly on the site of Holland Cottage, destroyed during the extensive German air raids of November 1940. The house was opened in 1978 and named after the Rt. Hon. The Lady Sinclair of Cleeve.

== Stoke Bishop halls ==
=== Durdham Hall ===
Durdham Hall is the newest of the halls of residence located in the Stoke Bishop site of the University of Bristol. It houses 220 undergraduate students. The hall is designed in the traditional 'Oxbridge' style in that it is built around a central quadrangle. Durdham Hall is split into four blocks (A-D) with each block being further divided into flats of five to seven people. Each flat has a large communal lounge/kitchen and all bedrooms are single en suite. The hall boasts a modern bar, which is the largest of all the bars in the Stoke Bishop halls, known as the Badger Bar, in homage to the badger sett that once occupied the site (the badgers have since been moved to a man-made sett adjacent to the hall). There is also a computer room, laundrette and music room with a keyboard.

=== Wills Hall ===
Wills Hall was officially opened by Sir Winston Churchill, who was then the chancellor of the university, in December 1929. It was built on a 26-acre (110,000 m^{2}) site around a nineteenth-century house called Downside which had been constructed in the style known as Strawberry Hill Gothic and which is now the Warden's house. The Hall was designed by Sir George Oatley who was also responsible for many other fine buildings in the university and the city. The cost of the building was met by Sir George Wills, in memory of his brother Henry Herbert Wills who originally presented the site to the university – both of whom were sons of Henry Overton Wills, the first Chancellor of the university.

The original Downside House was extended to form the east side of the Quadrangle (now known as Old Quad houses A to M). The panelled first-floor dining room with common rooms beneath (now including the JCR Bar) was built at the same time. The adornments of this building include the grotesque figures. In 1930 a chapel was added, the gift of Dame Monica Wills, the childless widow of Henry Herbert Wills. The grounds also include tennis and basketball courts, as well as a croquet lawn. To these original buildings new accommodation was added in 1961 when an L-shaped block known as XYZ was built. This was designed to form one part of a New Quad which was completed when UVW was opened in 1990. As well as providing over a hundred further rooms, all with en suite facilities, a conference centre was built at the same time, which includes a room capable of seating up to 200 people.

=== University Hall ===
University Hall, constructed in 1971, was the first self-catering hall of residence built on the Stoke Bishop site and accommodates around 300 students. The majority of students are accommodated in the six original buildings on University Close that comprise 12 flats each except for one block which contains 6 flats. These blocks providing five standard, single study-bedrooms with shared facilities. In 1992 an additional cottage-style building was added to the site. This building comprises eight flats, and the accommodation is arranged into six en-suite single study-bedrooms with a shared kitchen/diner.

The facilities include a large social area, bar, TV room, computer room, a study, music practice and entertainment room, terrace area and launderette. The hall is a five-minute walk from the main university sports ground and also shares sports facilities such as squash, tennis and croquet courts on the Stoke Bishop site. The hall is within a five-minute walk of the Downs. Clifton and Durdham Downs make up more than 400 acres (1.6 km^{2}) of grassland stretching from the very cliffs of the Avon Gorge to the edges of the Victorian-built suburbs.

=== Hiatt Baker Hall ===
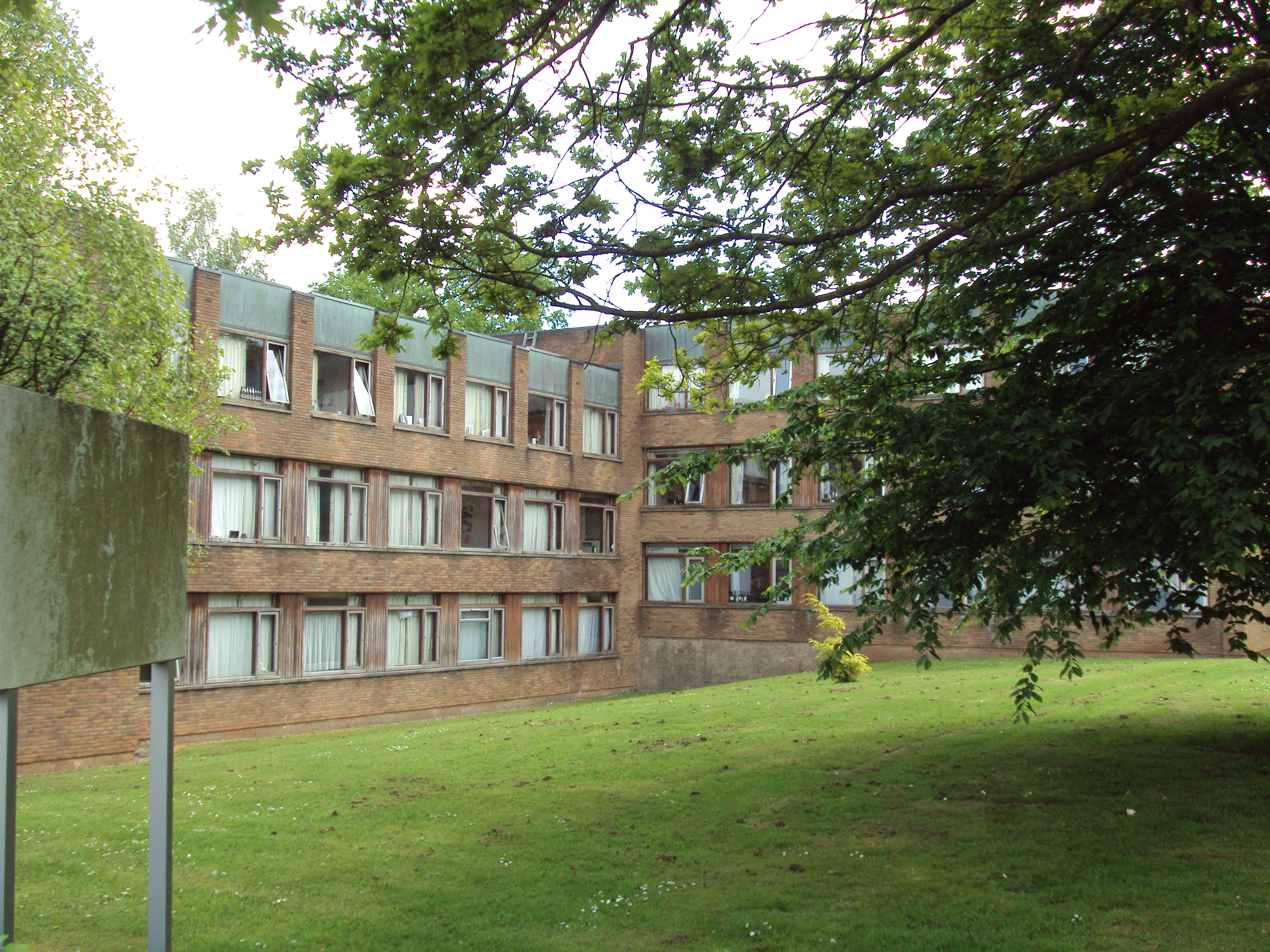
'A' Block, Hiatt Baker Hall

Hiatt Baker Hall contains both catered hall, and a self-catered new build section, completed in 2014. Together Hiatt Baker 1 and 2 house over 700 undergraduate students (the largest number of any University of Bristol Hall). The older buildings were designed by Sir Percy Thomas and Son in the 1960s.

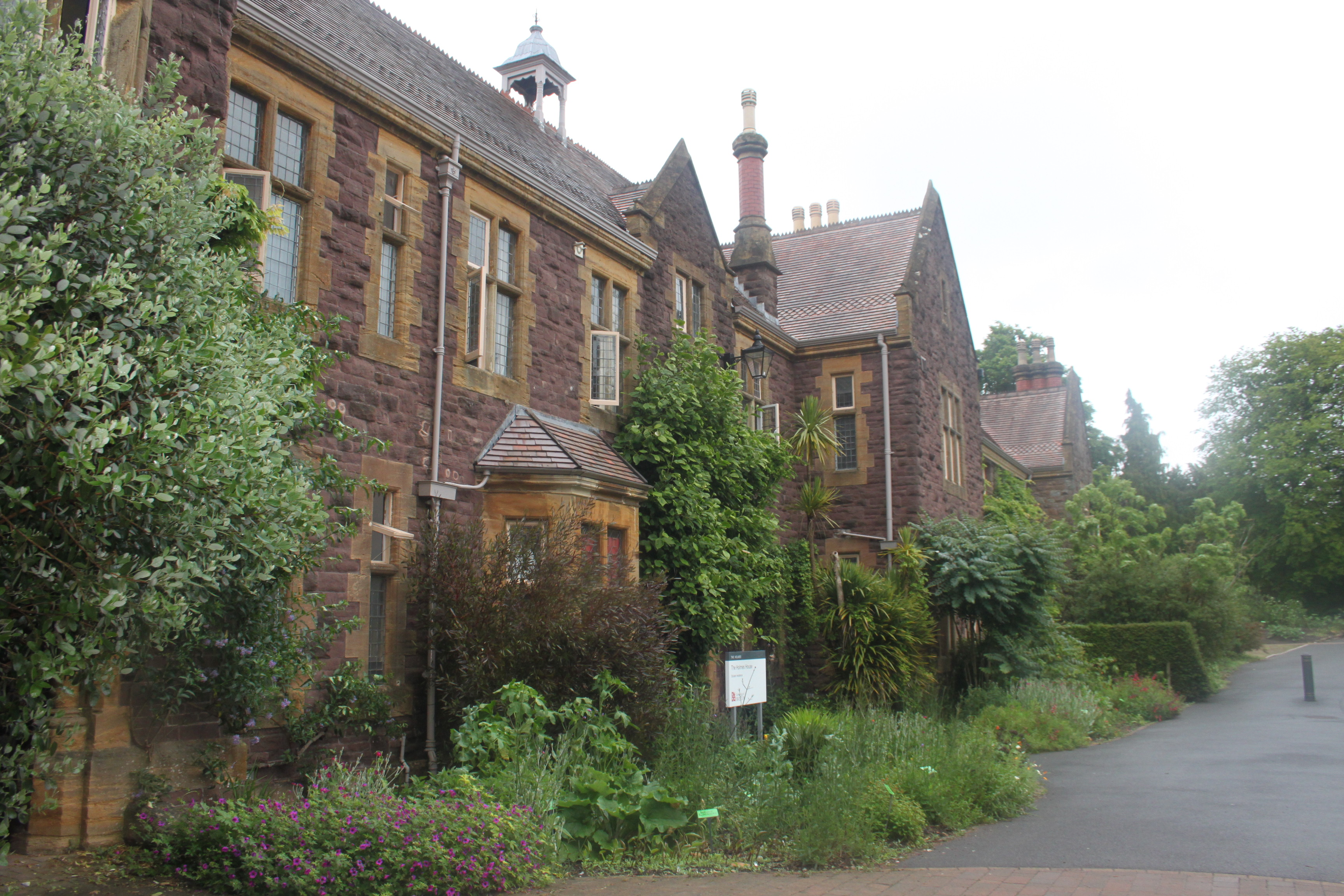
The Holmes and part of the University of Bristol Botanic Garden.

Hiatt Baker is named after the eminent biologist Hiatt Cowles Baker. H.C. Baker came from a 19th-century rags-to-riches story. His father, William M. Baker, started out bankrupt and destitute, moving to Bristol to find his fortune. He eventually become owner of Baker, Baker & Co., a department store of sorts, within the vicinity of the old castle grounds. It was through the Baker family that the link between the University of Bristol and the Holmes, now the site of the University of Bristol Botanic Garden, was forged; W.M. Baker rented the Holmes when the family's fortunes improved. The site then stayed within the tenancy of the Baker family, until acquired by the university in 1943. Hiatt Cowles Baker sat on the committee that obtained a royal charter for the University of Bristol, and later became Pro-Chancellor between 1929 and 1934. The Warden is Dr Nicholas Howden and the Deputy Wardens are Miles Taylor and Steve Bourke. Also available on site within the main block is "Source" cafe.

=== Churchill Hall ===
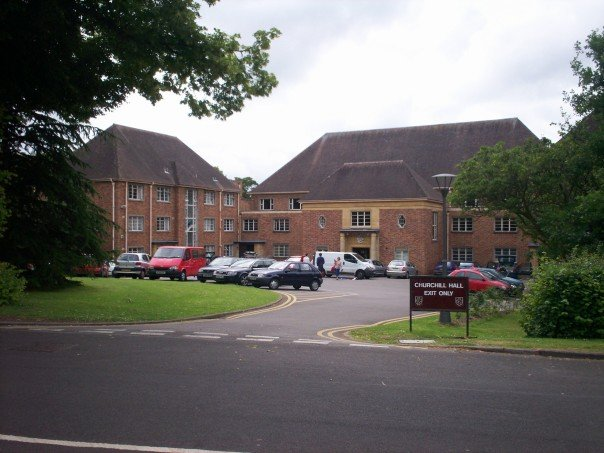
Churchill Hall in 2007

Churchill Hall is one of the halls of residence located in the Stoke Bishop site of the University of Bristol. It houses around 350 undergraduate students. Churchill Hall is split into blocks, or 'houses' as they are more formally known (A – R & The Holmes). Blocks A-K were built in the early 50s, in two phases, around a large split level quadrangle. The main block (K) houses a library/reading room, bar, table tennis room, piano room, dining hall, computer room, laundrette, the porters lodge, and the largest Junior Common Room in terms of floorspace of the Stoke Bishop Halls. Blocks M-R are the 'new' blocks. These feature significantly smaller rooms than those around old quad, yet share three bathrooms between every 8 rooms, and a small kitchenettes with microwaves, fridges and a sink. As part of the 'new block' redevelopment, a new student building, the 'hexagon', was added. This is a small building at the back of the main block which houses a Queen Anne snooker table.

The 'old' blocks are joined in various formations. AB and IJ form two opposing self-contained large 'houses'. These blocks have the largest rooms apart from The Holmes. They have washbasins. Bathrooms are between 6 people per floor. CDE and FGH form longer 'blocks' with rooms the same size as AB/IJ. They all contain small kitchenettes, much like the M, P, Q and R blocks. They also contain washrooms on the top floors. The Holmes is a large Victorian mansion house of historical interest. It sits within the university botanical gardens opposite the hall, and is another block in Churchill sometimes used for some temporary shared rooms (although not all). The rooms vary in size but tend to be considerably larger, by up to about 4 or 5 times, than even old block rooms. It formerly belonged to Wills Hall. The hall used to contain two other Victorian residences, Waltham and Claverton Cottages, Claverton having since become the Warden's Residence and Waltham now part of the Botanic Gardens.

=== Badock Hall ===
Badock Hall is a catered and self-catered hall of residence. It offers accommodation for 443 students, comprising single study bedrooms housed in ten separate units, each supervised by a senior resident. Units 7, 8, 9 and 10 were refurbished in the summer of 2017 and units 8 and 9 became self-catered. The hall was opened in 1964 and is named after the late Sir Stanley Hugh Badock, a former pro-chancellor, treasurer and chairman of council of the university. Badock Hall celebrated its 50th anniversary in December 2014 when the chancellor of the university, Baroness Hale of Richmond, unveiled a plaque and dedicated a new student activity centre, the Jubilee Building.

== Student houses ==
There are also a number of smaller residences that together make up the University of Bristol's student Houses collection of residences. These include:

=== The Hawthorns ===
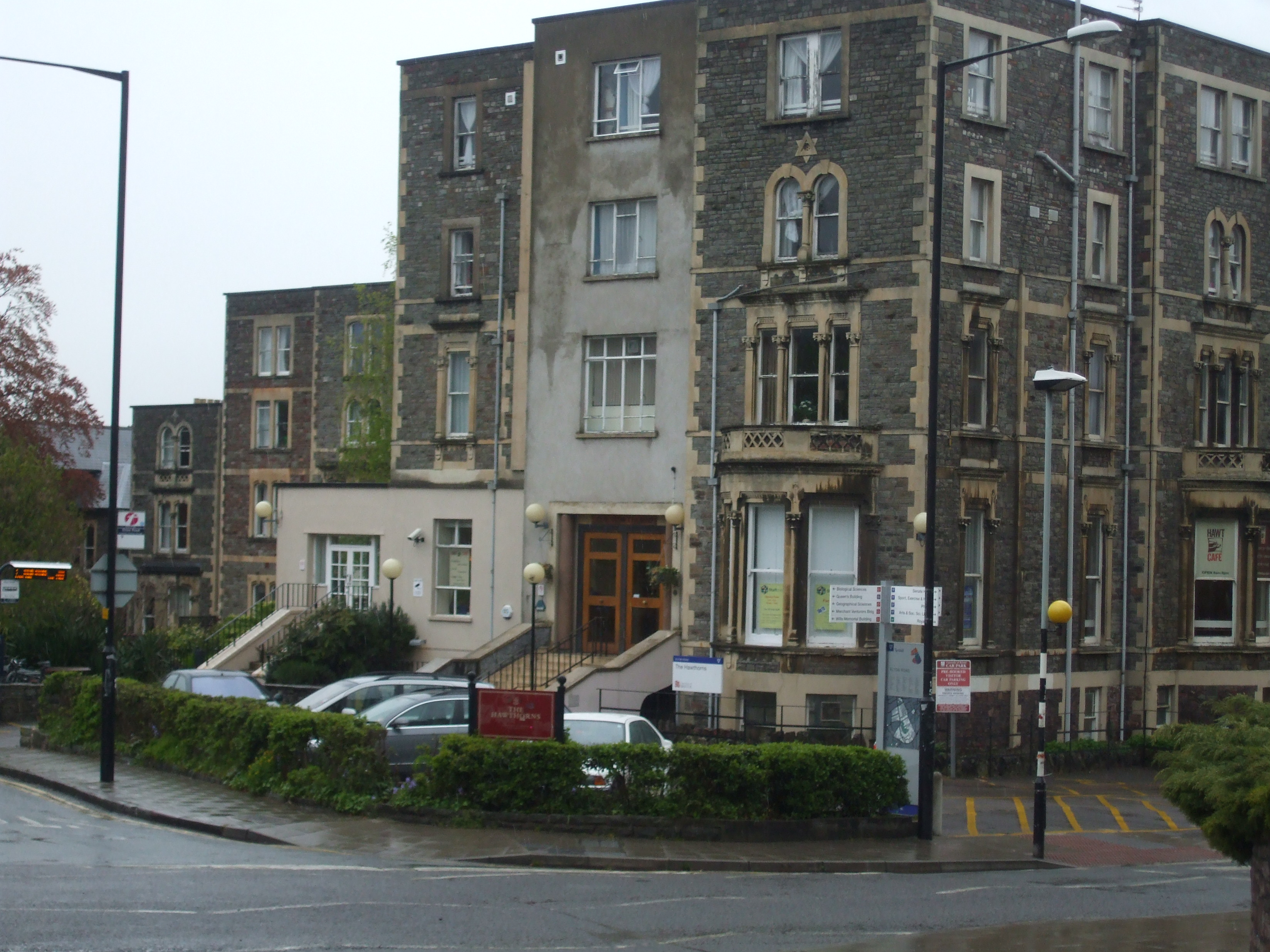
The Hawthorns

A former hotel, the residence has space for just over 100 students, and is situated within the university campus. The student rooms are on the upper floors, with the ground floor offering conference facilities, a refectory, and offices. There is a big variation in room size, with half having en-suite facilities, and 4 rooms being doubles. Located adjacent to a busy bus stop used by the Wessex 16 university bus, the Hawthorns is situated such that the university sports centre and most departments are a 1-minute walk.

=== Hillside/Woodside ===
Hillside/Woodside consists of two houses interlinked, and located near Leigh Woods. It has room for 29 students, with 4 double rooms. The residence is located close to Ashton Court, home of the Bristol International Balloon Fiesta, and Clifton Suspension Bridge.

=== Northwell House ===
Located just off the Gloucester Road, Northwell House was built in 1989. It is made up of two buildings, and is split up into 22 flats, each of which can hold 4–8 students. It has the capacity for 123 students, with 30 double rooms.

=== 115 Queens Road ===
Purpose-built in the 1960s, and refurbished in the summer of 2008, 115 Queen's Road is directly opposite the student's union, and so has quick access to the student bar and university swimming pool. It has 43 single rooms, with 7 rooms on the ground floor and 9 rooms on floors 1 through 4.

=== Winkworth House ===
Winkworth House was built to look like a terrace of houses. It is 5 mins walk from Bristol centre, 2 mins from Park Street and 10 mins from the University Precinct. Around 120 residents arranged in mostly flats of 7 (with some smaller).

== Partner properties ==
The university has a Partnership with Unite Students to provide several residences in the City Centre. In these properties the student experience, including pastoral care and social events, is managed by the University of Bristol as in all other residences, and the building management is run by Unite staff.

=== Unite House ===
Unite House is a self-catered residence situated near the Hippodrome. Unite House has a range of non-ensuite and ensuite rooms in 6 and 7 bed flats as well as studios. There is an onsite laundry, bike storage, common room, study room and courtyard.

=== Culver House ===
Culver House is a self-catered residence situated on Park Street. Culver House shares many of the facilities at Unite House and the two residences together form the university's City Centre Living residences.

=== Riverside collection of residences ===
There are three residences, close to each other on Bristol Harbour. Favell House, Waverley House and The Rackhay each have a communal reception area with sofas and a television where students gather.

=== Nelson House ===
Nelson House is located on Nelson Street in Bristol, home of the street art project, See No Evil. Nelson House is approximately fifteen minutes walk from the university campus.
