= Thorpe Hamlet =

Suburb of Norwich, England

Coordinates: 52.63°N 1.321°E

Rosary Cemetery, Norwich opened by the Rev Thomas Drummond in July 1821 in a former market garden in Thorpe Hamlet

Thorpe Hamlet is a suburb of Norwich, to the east of the city centre, in the Norwich District, in the English county of Norfolk. It was constituted a separate ecclesiastical parish on 9 March 1852, from the civil parish of Old Thorpe, and in 1912, was in the rural deanery of Blofield.

The population of the Thorpe Hamlet ward in Norwich was 10,557 at the 2011 Census.

The Church of St Matthew in Thorpe Hamlet was erected in 1851 upon land given by the Dean and Chapter of Norwich, on the slope of a hill close by the River Wensum.

Until 1852 it was part of the Dean and Chapter of Norwich.

== Amenities ==
Thorpe Hamlet has a mid school, a first school, a water tower and a wood called Lion Wood.

== History ==
Some Lollards, including Thomas Bilney, were martyred in the 'Lollards Pit' in Thorpe Wood, near Thorpe Hamlet, "where men are customablie burnt."

== Notable people ==
- Elizabeth Ayton Godwin (1817–1889), hymn writer, religious poet
