= Sneyd Park =

Suburb of Bristol, England

Coordinates: 51.4766°N 2.6421°W

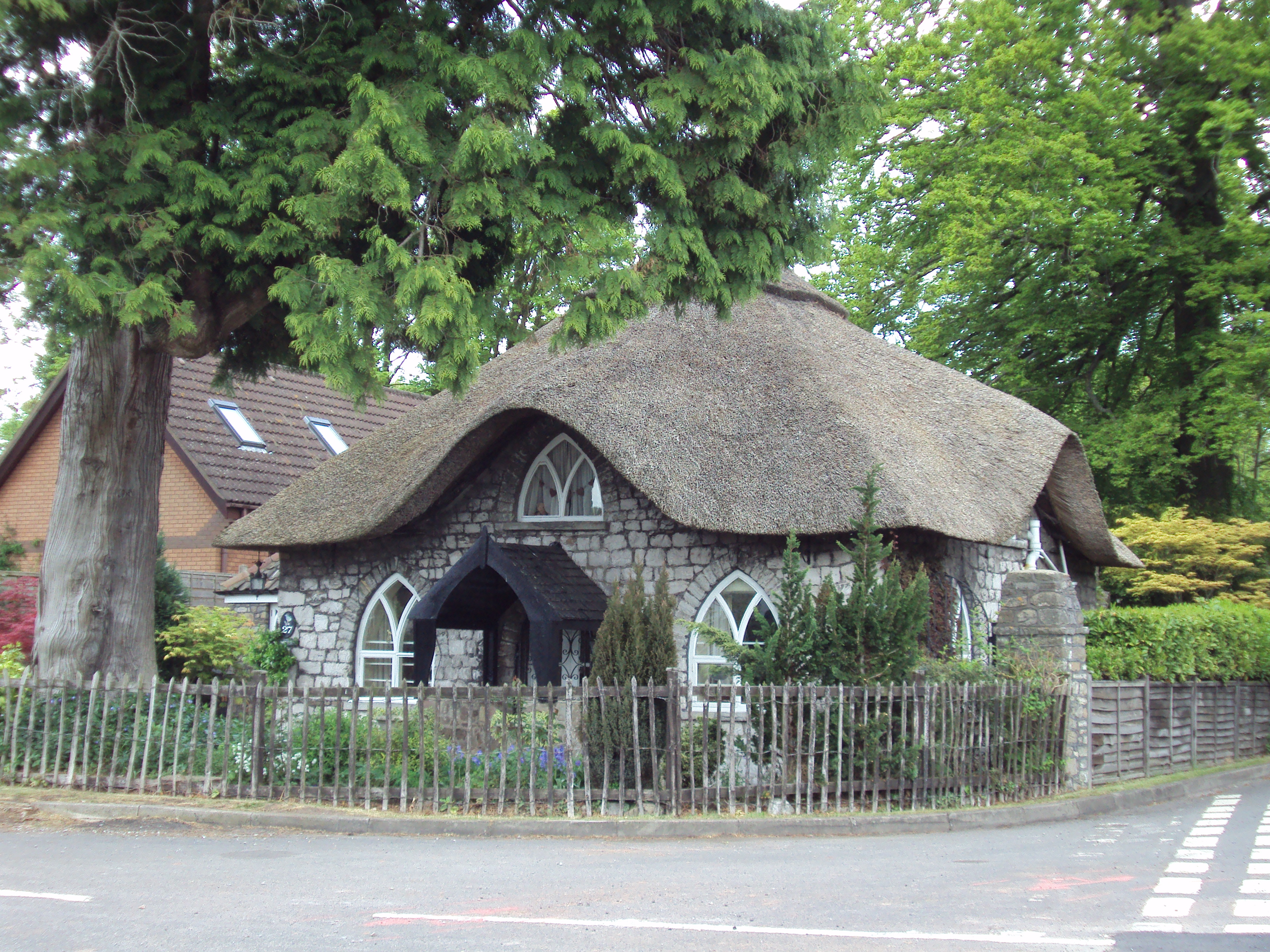
- A thatched cottage in Sneyd Park

- Location within Bristol
- OS grid reference: ST555755
- Unitary authority: Bristol
- Region: South West
- Country: England
- Sovereign state: United Kingdom
- Post town: BRISTOL
- Postcode district: BS9
- Dialling code: 0117
- Police: Avon and Somerset
- Fire: Avon
- Ambulance: South Western
- UK Parliament: Bristol North West

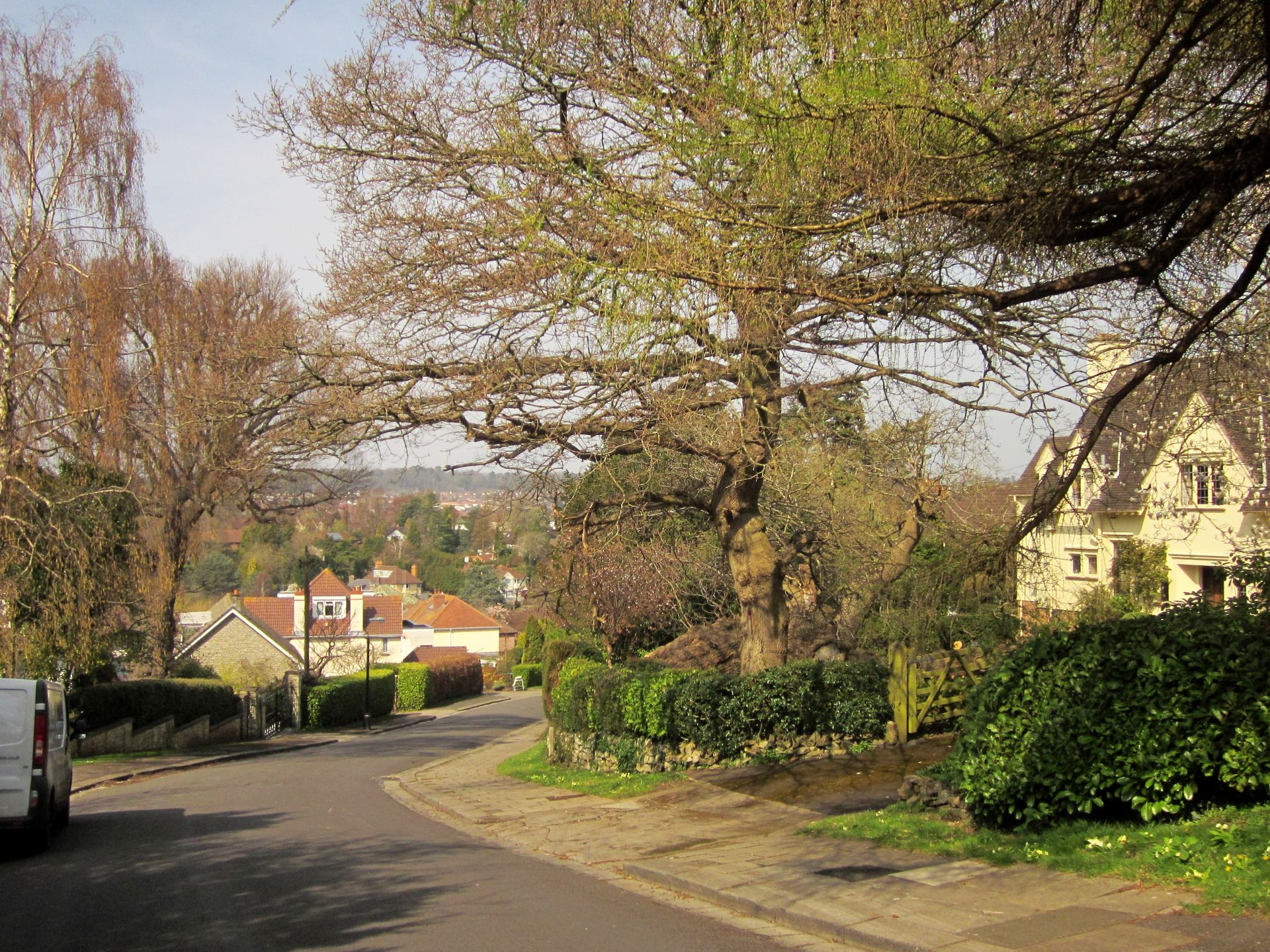

Sneyd Park is a suburb of Bristol, England, lying on the western fringe of Clifton Down, adjacent to the Avon Gorge and the Sea Walls observation point. It is part of the Stoke Bishop district. Home to many millionaires, Sneyd Park was originally developed in Victorian times. Many Victorian and Edwardian villas line the edge of the Downs. More modern housing has since been built down over the slope, towards Sea Mills, Bristol. Much of this development was carried out by the Stride family builders whose practice was "to purchase an estate freehold and to erect thereon their own houses, with the knowledge that none will be able to come along and dump a lot of cheap houses down in the neighbourhood, thereby spoiling the amenities of the place and detracting from the value of the houses erected by the firm." The 'Stride brothers' specialised in constructing individual style homes with the emphasis on location, finish and design. Buildings were never duplicated and no two were built to the same design. They often have solid oak interior doors, oak-panelled hallways, the hallmark Stride letterboxes and impressive staircases. Brothers Jared and Jethro Stride founded the business in the 1920s, followed by Jared's sons Arthur and Frederick, and then their sons Leslie and Raymond. In 1864 Jared and Jethro's brother Lot was killed in an accident in a sawmill in Cardiff when his hair was caught in the revolving saw. The incident made the newspapers around the world. Prior to developing Sneyd Park Edwin Stride and his sons Jared and Jethro had set up the Crown Brick Works in Shirehampton to supply bricks for the docks then under construction.

Clifton Down, in the vicinity of Sea Walls, was the location of the flight, on 12 November 1910, of the first aircraft built by the Bristol and Colonial Aeroplane Company. Many thousands of Bristol's citizens flocked to see two well-known French pilots, Maurice Tétard and Henri Jullerot, give a public demonstration of the new Bristol Boxkite. Blériot's famous flight across the English Channel had occurred only the year before.
