= Severnside Sirens =

Civil Defense sirens in England

Severnside Siren locations

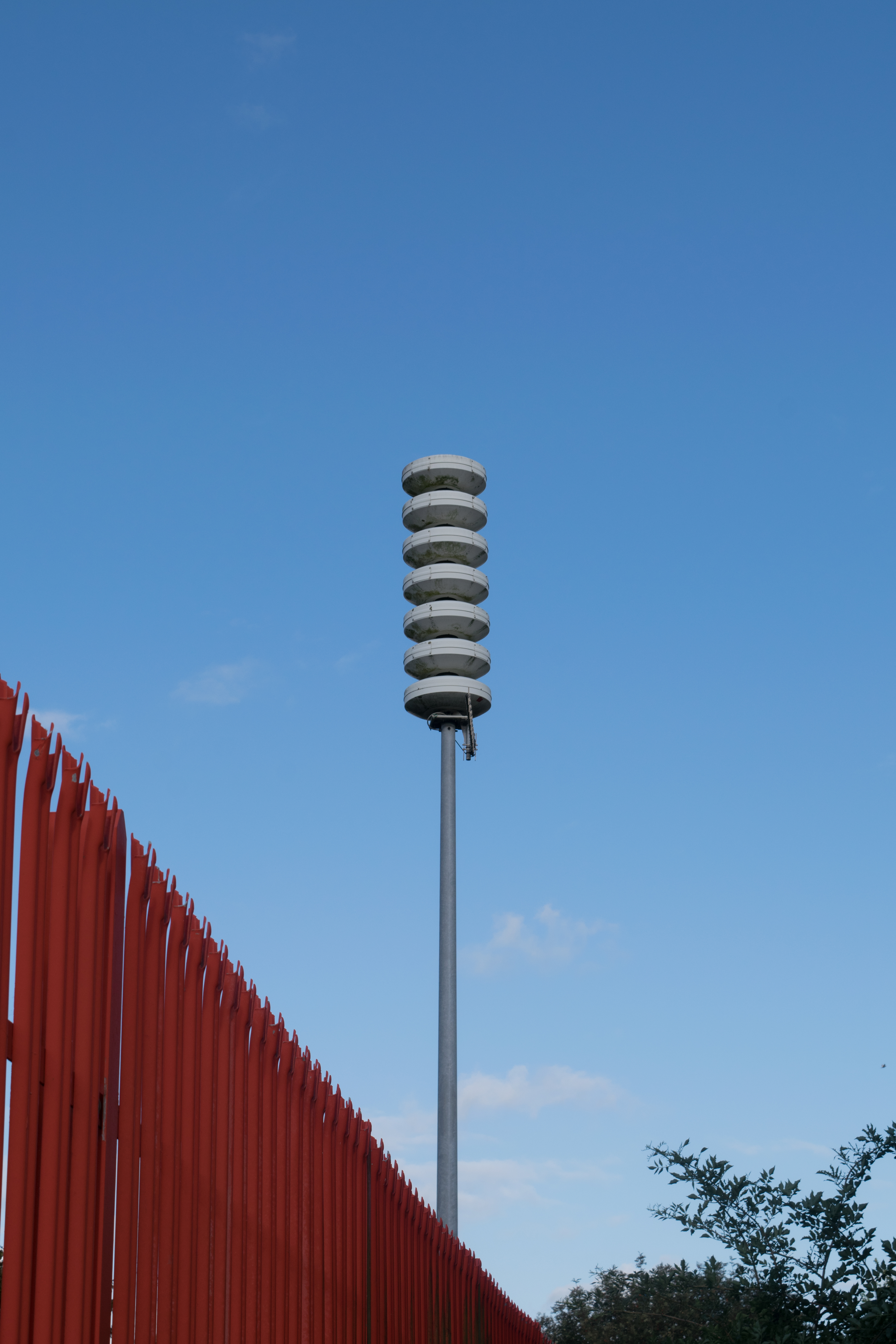
The Victoria Road siren in Avonmouth, a Federal Signal Modulator

The Severnside Sirens are a system of civil defense sirens located along the South Severn Estuary coastline from Redcliffe Bay to Pilning, northwest of Bristol. They are activated by Avon and Somerset Police in the event of a potential incident at one of the COMAH sites located in the area, mainly in and near Avonmouth. The system was set up in 1997 following a fire at the Albright and Wilson site in 1996.

== Severnside Sirens Trust ==
Severnside Sirens Trust Limited is the organisation responsible for maintaining the system. It is a registered company (number 3348008) and charity (number 1063224) and was incorporated on 9 April 1997. The trust's activities are funded by the 3 local authorities whose constituents the sirens serve, North Somerset Council, Bristol City Council, and South Gloucestershire Council, and from donations from the organisations running the COMAH sites themselves.

== Sirens ==
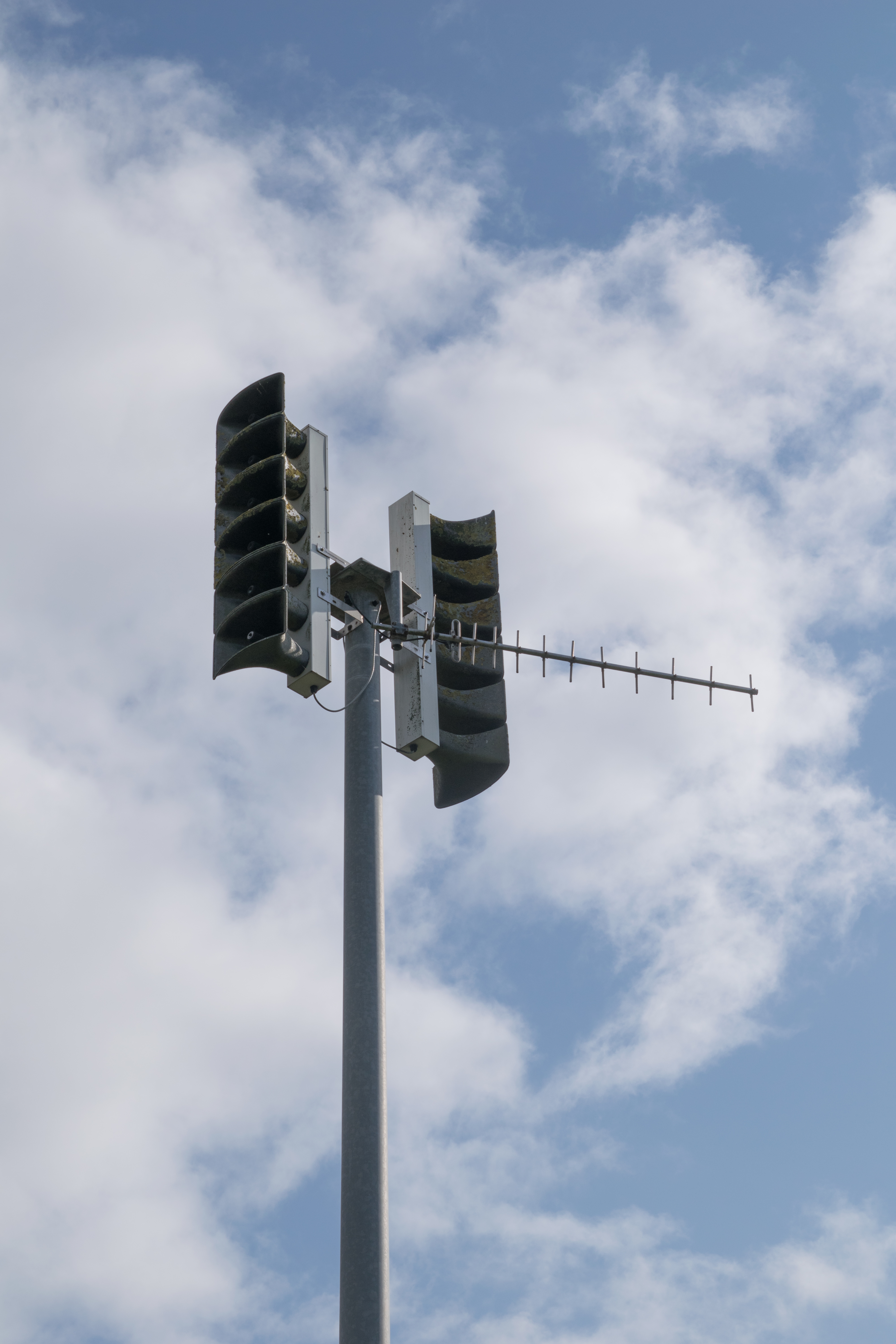
A Federal Signal DSA 6x2 in Lamplighters Marsh, Shirehampton. The antenna used to receive control signals is clearly visible.

The sirens themselves are mounted on dedicated poles and all but one are manufactured by the Federal Signal Corporation. Most of them are Federal Signal Modulators. They are operated via radio signal from a control system at Avon and Somerset Police Headquarters in Portishead.

Severnside Sirens, as of Jan 2022
Designation	Location	Coordinates	Comment
Siren 1 "Bristol Water"	Shirehampton - in Lamplighters Marsh.	51.484522°N 2.684222°W	This siren is directional, with loudspeaker cones pointed across the river to Pill and towards Shirehampton proper.
Siren 2 "Ridingleaze Clinic"	Lawrence Weston - behind the Bristol City Children and Young People's Services building	51.500824°N 2.658872°W	
Siren 3 "Portishead Fire Station"	Portishead Fire Station car park	51.486291°N 2.768267°W	
Siren 4 "Bristol Port Company - Police Station"	Royal Portbury Dock next to the Port of Bristol Police Station	51.489605°N 2.720074°W	
Siren 5 "Bristol Port Company - West Town Gate"	Avonmouth, at the end of Victoria Road	51.495548°N 2.694250°W	
Siren 6 "Bristol Port Company - X Berth"	Royal Edward Dock - opposite St Andrews Road railway station	51.512590°N 2.697728°W	
Siren 7 "Former Sevalco Site, Chittening Road"	Chittening, towards the north end of Chittening Road	51.531813°N 2.673405°W	Located across the road from the site of the former Sevalco carbon black factory.
Siren 8 Govier Way (Royal Mail SWDC)	Outside Royal Mail South West Distribution Centre on Govier Way	51.551094°N 2.651395°W	
Siren 9 "BT Exchange, Pilning"	Pilning - by the telephone exchange building behind the Pilning Surgery	51.564183°N 2.641430°W	
Siren 10 "Hallen"	Hallen, In the vicinity of the Hallen Fuel Depot between the village and Henbury	51.514390°N 2.635454°W	Added to the system in 2013.
Siren 11 "Redcliffe Bay"	Redcliffe Bay, on the Arqiva transmitting mast	51.472287°N 2.808737°W	This siren is directional. Added to the system in 2006 as a klaxon, replaced with a Federal Signal in 2019.
Siren 12 "Redcliffe Bay"	Redcliffe Bay	51.474966°N 2.812173°W	This siren is directional. Added to the system in 2006. Made by Klaxon, running on Federal Signal controller.

== Testing ==
The sirens are tested at 1500 on the 3rd of every month. The test comprises the following:

- 3 minutes of the alert warning (a continuous, stepped, rising tone)
- 1 minute of silence
- 1 minute of the all clear siren (a continuous constant tone)

Local volunteers monitor the sirens on test day.

Videos of the sirens being tested	Video Links:
Siren 1 - Shirehampton, Lamplighters Marsh	https://www.youtube.com/watch?v=JBIeYh30hCU
Siren 2 - Ridingleaze Clinic	https://www.youtube.com/watch?v=PirqOqzbkOc&t=2s
Siren 3 - Portishead Fire Station	https://www.youtube.com/watch?v=Kcuv84Fwues
Siren 4 - Bristol Port Company	No Videos
Siren 5 - BPC, West End Gate	https://www.youtube.com/watch?v=l84HapE7y4Y&t=52s
Siren 6 - BPC, X Berth	https://www.youtube.com/watch?v=FgjRq5PCRyE&t=120s
Siren 7 - Chittening Road	https://www.youtube.com/watch?v=OGUuKEXp_RE&t=31s
Siren 8 - Govier Way, Royal Mail SWDC	No Videos
Siren 9 - Pilning, BT Exchange	https://www.youtube.com/watch?v=zKxW8NYR9Dw&t=17s
Siren 10 - Hallen	No Videos
Siren 11 - Redcliffe Bay, Arqiva Mast	https://www.youtube.com/watch?v=4SHCkm6n-rg&t=60s
Siren 12 - Redcliffe Bay	https://www.youtube.com/watch?v=q3Yi7GE7yes
