= Pyrus domestica =

Pyrus domestica may refer to two different plant species:

- Pyrus domestica (L.) Ehrh., a synonym for Cormus domestica, a type of rowan tree
- Pyrus domestica (Borkh.) Medik., a synonym for Pyrus communis, the common pear tree
