= Horseshoe Bend, Shirehampton =

Site of special scientific interest in Bristol, England

Coordinates: 51°29′18″N 02°39′47″W

- Site of Special Scientific Interest
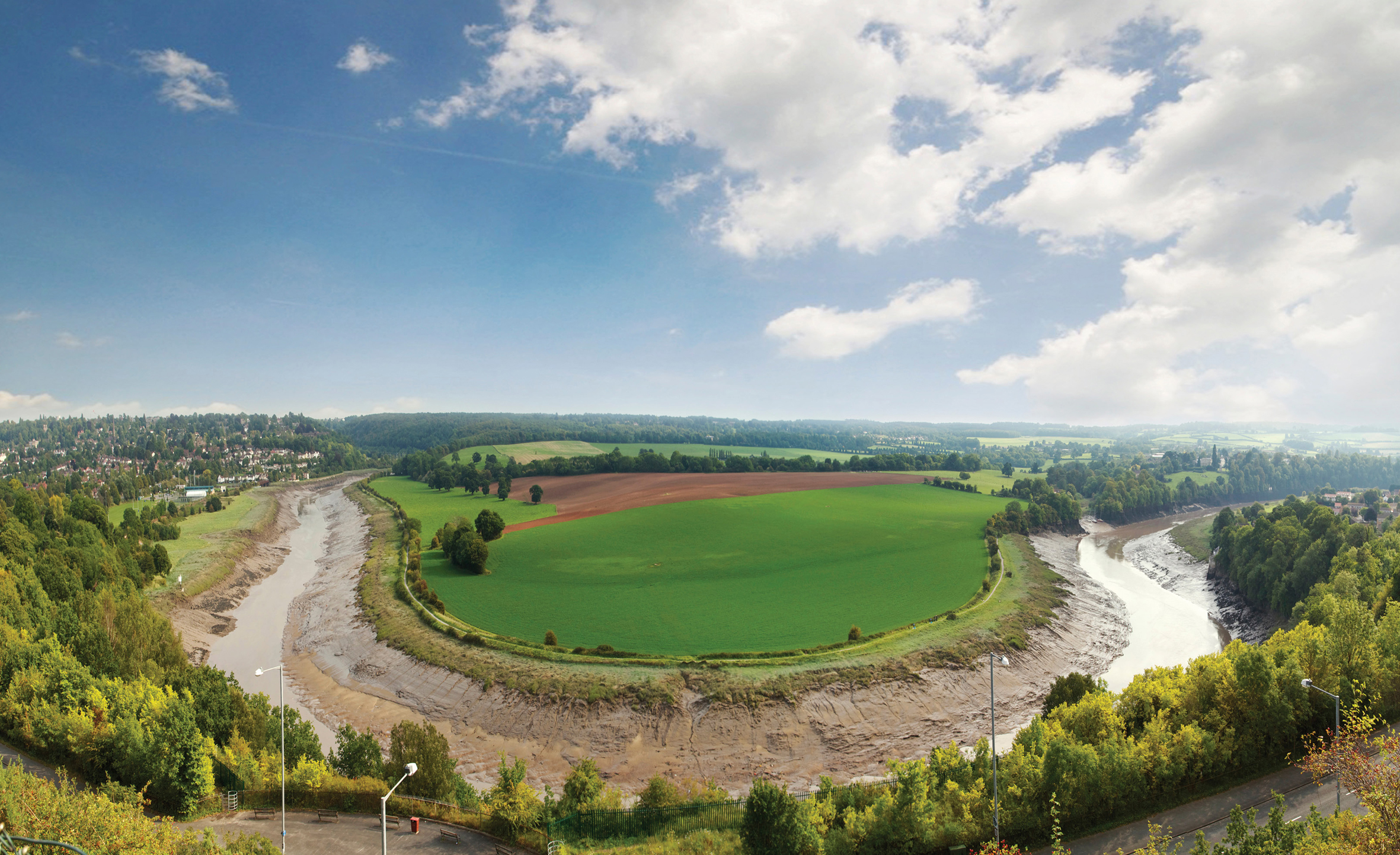
- Location of Horseshoe Bend, Shirehampton.
- Area of search: Avon
- Grid reference: ST542767
- Interest: Biological
- Area: 4.45 ha (11.0 acres)
- Notification date: 1999
- Location map: Horseshoe Bend, Shirehampton (Bristol)

Horseshoe Bend, Shirehampton (grid reference ST542767) is an 11 acre (4.45 hectare) biological Site of Special Scientific Interest in Bristol, England, on the north bank of a lower, tidal stretch of the River Avon, 1.9 miles (3.1 kilometres) downstream from the Avon Gorge, and just east of Shirehampton. It was notified as an SSSI in 1999.

== Description ==
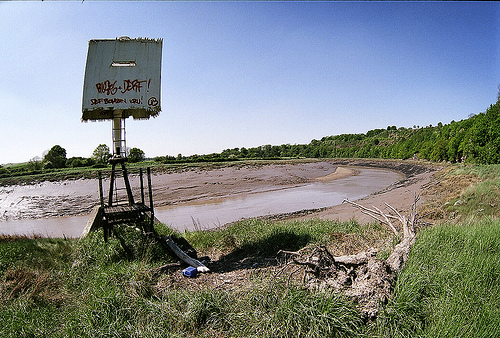
Horseshoe Bend on the River Avon

The site consists of a wooded cliff and a narrow salt marsh. The underlying rocks are Devonian sandstone and Carboniferous limestone, overlaid with Triassic dolomitic conglomerate.

== Biological interest ==
=== Wooded cliff ===
The site's principal interest and the reason for its designation as an SSSI is the presence of a population of the True Service-tree (Sorbus domestica) growing on the cliffs. This tree is nationally rare in Britain, and this site hosts the largest known population in England. Other notable species of Sorbus here are the whitebeams Sorbus eminens and Sorbus anglica, both of which are also nationally rare in Britain. The nationally scarce Large-leaved Lime (Tilia platyphyllos) also occurs, and herbs include Field Garlic (Allium oleraceum) and Pale St. John's-wort (Hypericum montanum).

=== Saltmarsh plants ===
The saltmarsh vegetation, which lies at the base of the cliff, is predominantly made up of Sea Aster (Aster tripolium) and English Scurvygrass (Cochlearia anglica). There are however two nationally scarce vascular plant species here as well – Slender Hare's-ear (Bupleurum tenuissimum) and Long-stalked Orache (Atriplex longipes).

== Wreck of the Kron Prinz ==
On 1 April 1874, the German grain ship SS Kron Prinz was under tow up the Avon, laden with 7,000 quarters (28,000 imperial bushels, 1,000 m^{3}) of grain. There was an adequate depth of water, as it was approaching high tide, but on the narrow channel through Horseshoe Bend she grounded on the outer bank. As the tide soon began to ebb, the ship settled onto the steep mud bank and then fell over. The cargo was lost and to avoid blocking the navigation channel, the ship was demasted. Nearly three weeks later, on 20 April, she was refloated and taken to Bristol for repairs, at a cost of £34,000, equivalent to £3,324,123 in 2025.

The grounded ship was photographed and there is a well-known photograph of her on her side, taken from across the Avon. This was later published as a postcard by local photographer Fred Little, although it was not (as sometimes claimed) his photograph, as he had been born in the same year.

The ship was later renamed the SS Idraet and was lost in the North Sea in 1899.

== Impact on port of Bristol ==
When built at Bristol in 1843, SS Great Britain was the largest vessel ever built, with a length of 322 feet. It could not have been greater, as Horseshoe Bend lay between Bristol and the Bristol Channel to the Atlantic Ocean. Great ships got ever larger, and this led to the development of the new port of Avonmouth in the 1860s.
