= Samuel Seyer =

English schoolmaster and cleric

Samuel Seyer (1757–1831) was an English schoolmaster and cleric, known as a historian of Bristol.

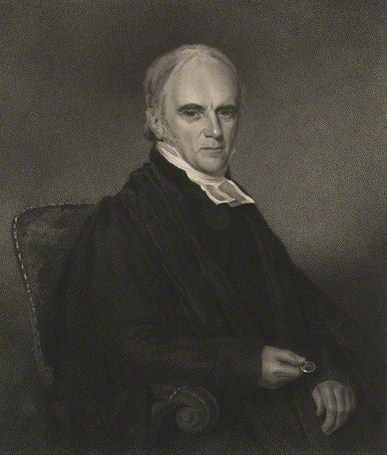
Samuel Seyer, 1824 engraving

== Life ==
He was the son of Samuel Seyer (c.1719 – 1776), master of Bristol grammar school, and his wife Ann Ebsworthy (married 1754 Bristol). He matriculated at Corpus Christi College, Oxford, on 25 November 1772, and graduated B.A. in 1776 and M.A. in 1780.

In 1781 he married Elizabeth Turner at Wraxall, Somerset. His daughter Sibylla (1782 - 1847) married the Rev. Abel Lendon, rector of St James the Great, Friern Barnet.

About 1790 Seyer succeeded John Jones at the Royal Fort school, where for ten years Andrew Crosse was among his scholars, who found him narrow-minded and unjust. Other pupils were John Kenyon and William John Broderip.

In 1813 Seyer became perpetual curate of Horfield, and in 1824 rector of Filton, Gloucestershire.

He died at his house in Berkeley Square, Bristol on 25 August 1831 aged 73, and was buried at St Mary's churchyard, Shirehampton.

== Works ==
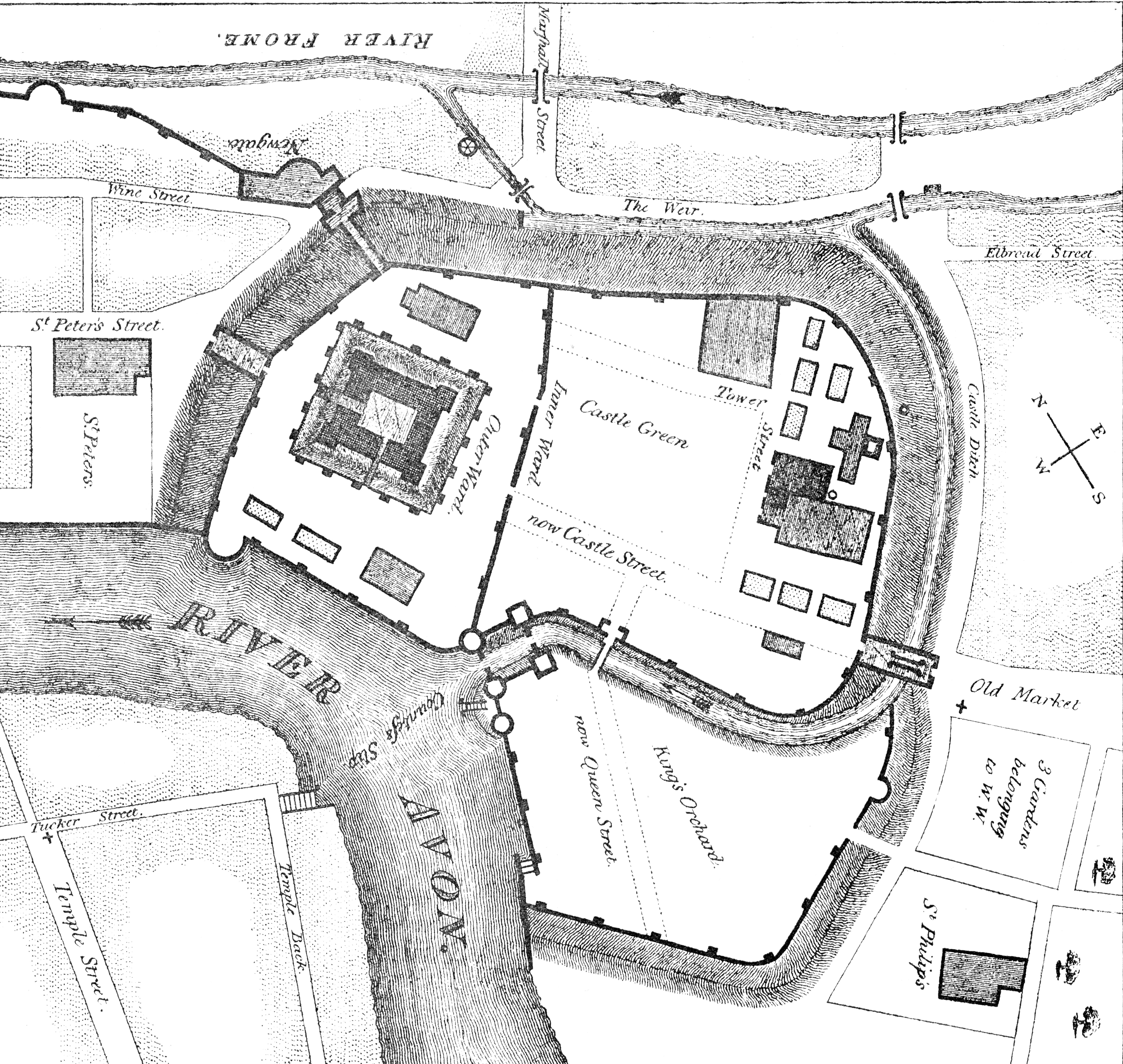
Bristol Castle, old plan from Samuel Seyer's Memoirs, Historical and Topographical, of Bristol

Following first William Barrett, author of the History and Antiquities of Bristol, whom he knew well, Seyer published in 1812 Charters and Letters Patent granted to the Town and City of Bristol. The Latin is printed under an English translation. Seyer was refused access to the originals in the Bristol council-house, and based his text on a late manuscript in the Bodleian Library (Rawlinson 247); he used a translation published in 1736.

In 1821–3 appeared Seyer's Memoirs, Historical and Topographical, of Bristol and its Neighbourhood, with plates by Edward Blore and others (2 vols.). The work, which brings the narrative down to 1760, incorporated the archives of the Berkeley family and the Bristol calendars. Seyer's collections for a second part, on the topography of Bristol, were preserved in manuscript in the Museum Library, Bristol.

Seyer published also:

- The Principles of Christianity, 1796, 1806.
- The Syntax of Latin Verbs, 1798.
- Observations on the Causes of Clerical Non-residence, and on the Act of Parliament lately passed for its Prevention, 1808.
- Latium Redivivum: a Treatise on the Modern Use of the Latin Language and the Prevalence of the French; to which is added a Specimen, accommodated to Modern Use, 1808.

He translated into English verse the Latin poem of Marco Girolamo Vida on chess.

== Notes ==
Attribution

This article incorporates text from a publication now in the public domain: Lee, Sidney, ed. (1897). "Seyer, Samuel". Dictionary of National Biography. Vol. 51. London: Smith, Elder & Co.
