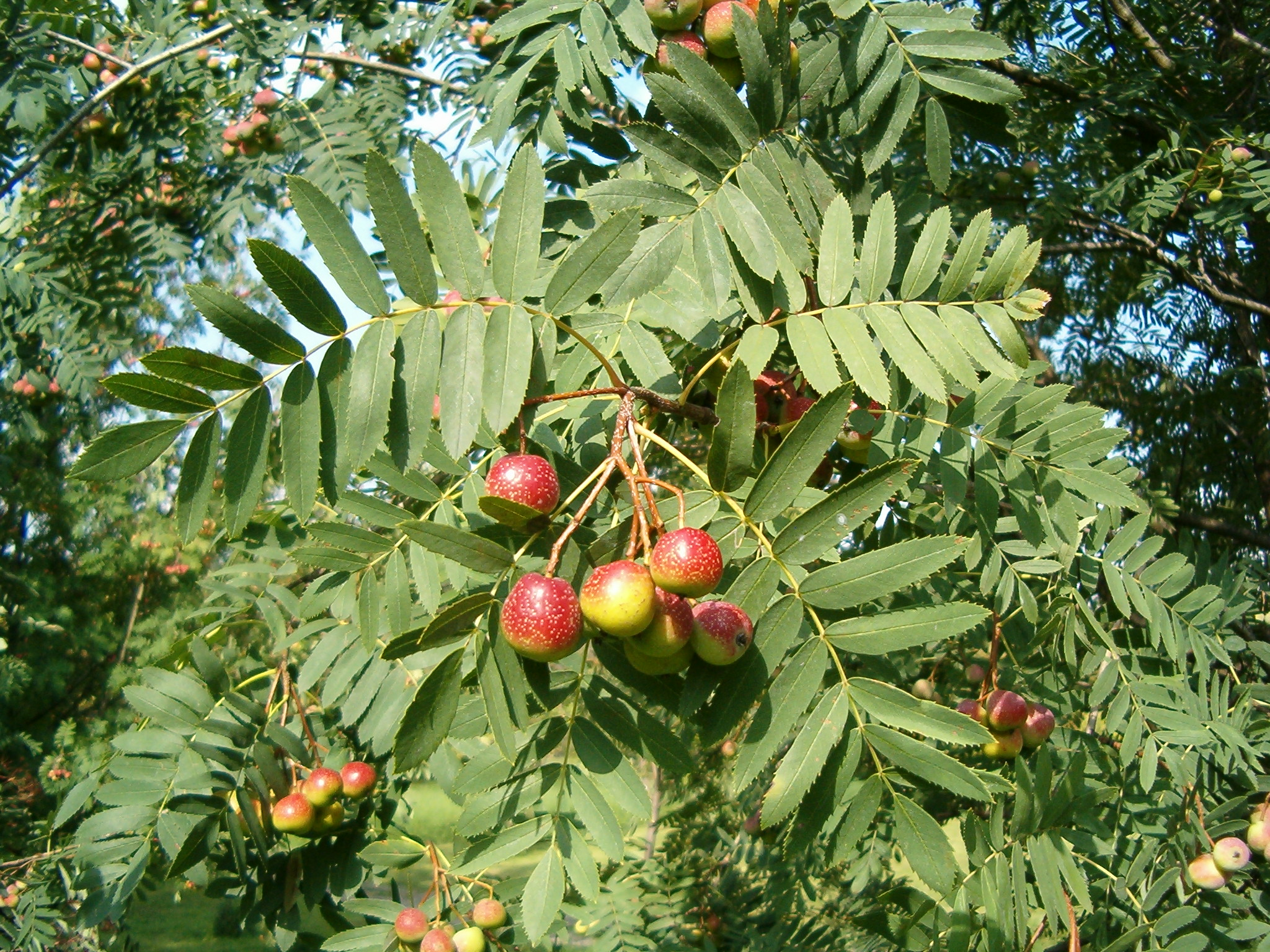

Conservation status
- Least Concern (IUCN 3.1)

Scientific classification
- Kingdom: Plantae
- Clade: Tracheophytes
- Clade: Angiosperms
- Clade: Eudicots
- Clade: Rosids
- Order: Rosales
- Family: Rosaceae
- Subfamily: Amygdaloideae
- Tribe: Maleae
- Subtribe: Malinae
- Genus: Cormus; Spach
- Species: C. domestica

Binomial name
- Cormus domestica (L.) Spach
- Distribution map

Synonyms
- List: Crataegus austera Salisb.; Mespilus domestica (L.) All.; Pyrus domestica (L.) Ehrh.; Sorbus domestica L.; Cormus domestica var. aucubifolia Lavallée; Cormus domestica var. maliformis Lavallée; Cormus domestica var. microcarpa Lavallée; Cormus domestica var. monstrosa Lavallée; Cormus domestica var. paradisiaca Lavallée; Cormus domestica var. piriformis Lavallée; Cormus domestica var. pusilla Lavallée; Cormus domestica var. upsaliensis Lavallée; Malus sorbus Borkh.; Malus sorbus (Gaertn.) Borkh.; Prunus sorbus (Gaertn.) P.Gaertn., B.Mey. & Scherb.; Pyrenia sorbus (Gaertn.) Clairv.; Pyrus domestica piriformis Kirchn. & J.Eichler; Pyrus domestica syrmiensis (Kit.) Asch. & Graebn.; Pyrus sorbus Gaertn.; Pyrus sorbus Borkh.; Pyrus sorbus var. maliformis (Lodd.) Loudon; Pyrus sorbus var. pyriformis (Lodd.) Loudon; Sorbus domestica var. albida Risso; Sorbus domestica var. elongata Risso; Sorbus domestica var. macrocarpa Risso; Sorbus domestica var. maliformis Lodd.; Sorbus domestica f. maliformis (Lodd.) Gams; Sorbus domestica var. maliformis G.Kirchn.; Sorbus domestica var. microcarpa Risso; Sorbus domestica var. obtinui Bertol.; Sorbus domestica var. obtusata Diap.; Sorbus domestica f. piriformis (Kirchn. & J.Eichler) Gams; Sorbus domestica pomifera Hayne; Sorbus domestica var. pomifera (Hayne) Rehder; Sorbus domestica f. pomifera (Hayne) Rehder; Sorbus domestica pyrifera Hayne; Sorbus domestica var. pyrifera (Hayne) Rehder; Sorbus domestica f. pyrifera (Hayne) Rehder; Sorbus domestica var. pyriformis Lodd.; Sorbus domestica f. pyriformis (Lodd.) Gams; Sorbus domestica var. serotina Risso; Sorbus syrmiensis Kit.

= Cormus domestica =

Service tree

Species of flowering plants

Cormus domestica, commonly known as service tree or sorb tree, is an Old World species of tree in the rose family (Rosaceae). It may be called the true service tree to distinguish it from the wild service tree (Aria torminalis, syn. Sorbus torminalis). It is commonly classified as the only species in the monotypic genus Cormus, although the synonym Sorbus domestica continues to be used.

== Description ==
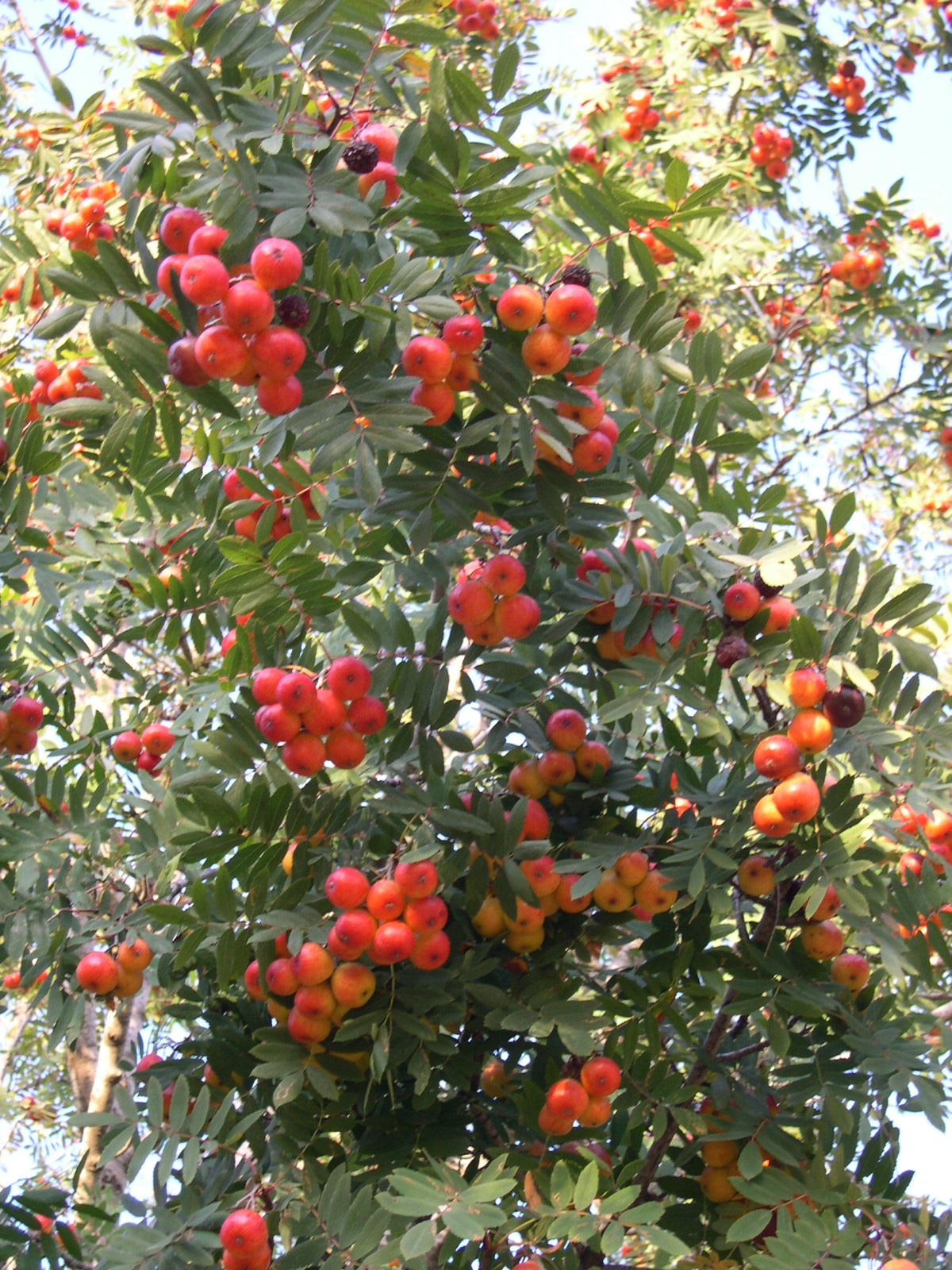
Foliage and fruit

The service tree is deciduous and grows to 15–20 metres (49–66 ft), rarely 30 m (100 ft), in height, with a trunk up to 1 m (3 ft 3 in) diameter; it can also grow as a shrub 2–3 m (6 1/2–10 ft) tall on exposed sites. The bark is brown, smooth on young trees, becoming scaly and rough on older trees. The winter buds are green, with a sticky, resinous coating.

The leaves are 15–25 centimetres (6–10 inches) long, pinnate with 13–21 leaflets 3–6 cm (1 1/4–2 1/4 in) long and 1 cm (1/2 in) broad. The leaves have a bluntly acute apex, and a serrated margin on the outer half or two thirds of the leaflet. The margin of the leaflets has slender teeth, except towards the base, which is entire, glabrous above and more or less downy beneath, becoming glabrous or nearly so by autumn.

The flowers are 13–18 millimetres (1/2–3/4 in) in diameter, with five white to pinkish petals and 20 creamy-white stamens; they are produced in corymbs 10–14 cm (4–5 1/2 in) diameter in late spring, and are hermaphrodite and insect pollinated. The fruit is a human-edible pome 2–3 cm (3/4–1 1/8 in) called the "serviceberry" that is long, greenish-brown, and often tinged red on the side exposed to sunlight; it can be either apple-shaped (f. pomifera [Hayne] Rehder) or pear-shaped (f. pyrifera [Hayne] Rehder).

It is a long-lived tree, with ages of 300–400 years estimated for some in Britain. One of the largest and probably oldest known specimens in Europe is on an educational trail near the town of Strážnice in the province of Moravia, Czech Republic. Its trunk measures 462 cm (15.16 ft) in circumference, with a crown 11 m (36 ft) high and 18 m (59 ft) across. It is estimated to be around 450 years old.

=== Similar species ===
The species is similar to some rowans.

== Taxonomy ==
=== Taxonomic history ===
The service tree was formally described by Carl Linnaeus as Sorbus domestica in his Species Plantarum (1753). In the aftermath, it was included in several other genera, including Cormus, Crataegus, Malus, Mespilus and Pyrus. Since the early 20th century, it has been mainly included in a broadly circumscribed genus Sorbus or, alternatively, within the usually monotypic genus Cormus. Starting in the late 2010s, its classification in Cormus tended to be preferred, but Sorbus domestica continues to be used (as of July 2026).

=== Evolution ===
Within Maleae, the service tree is usually classified within a clade that includes genera such as Pyrus, Sorbus, Aria, and Micromeles. However, the exact relationships within that clade are poorly resolved, owing to a particularly complicated evolutionary history, likely involving rapid diversification and extensive hybridisation. While there are no studies focused on the service tree's origin, its divergence time has been estimated by three studies, with differing results, placing it in either the late Eocene (c. 40 million years ago), the early Oligocene (c. 30 million years ago), or the late Miocene (c. 10 million years ago).

Fossil remains across Europe have been attributed to the service tree or its close extinct relatives. Fossils dating to the late Miocene (c. 10–5 million years ago) of Senigallia, Italy, that were initially described as Sorbus synoica, have been attributed to the species. Additionally, fossils from the late Pliocene (c. 3 million years ago) of Willershausen, Germany, and early Pleistocene (between c. 2–1 million years ago) fossils from Bernasso (France), Crespiá (Spain), and Oriolo (Italy) have been attributed to the species, and similar leaf fossils have also been reported from the late Pleistocene (c. 400 thousand years ago) from the vicinity of Rome and the late Miocene of Chiuzbaia, Romania. Rowan (Sorbus aucuparia) leaves can be very similar to service tree leaves, however, particularly when growing on dry sites.

=== Etymology ===
The English name comes from Middle English serves, plural of serve, from Old English syrfe, borrowed from the Latin name sorbus; it is unrelated to the verb serve. Other English names include sorb, sorb tree, and whitty pear—"whitty" because the leaves are similar to rowan (i.e. pinnate), and "pear" due to the shape of the fruit. The name sorb is also from the Latin sorbus, alluding to its fruit and has no connection with the Slavic ethnic groups known as the Sorbs and Serbs.

== Distribution and habitat ==
Its continuous range includes much of Europe as well as northern Anatolia, but isolated populations have been found in the Atlas Mountains of Northwest Africa, and east into the Caucasus and northwestern Iran.

In central Europe, it can be found on temperate, south-facing slopes up to 650 m (2,130 ft) above sea level, and higher in the Mediterranean basin.

== Ecology ==
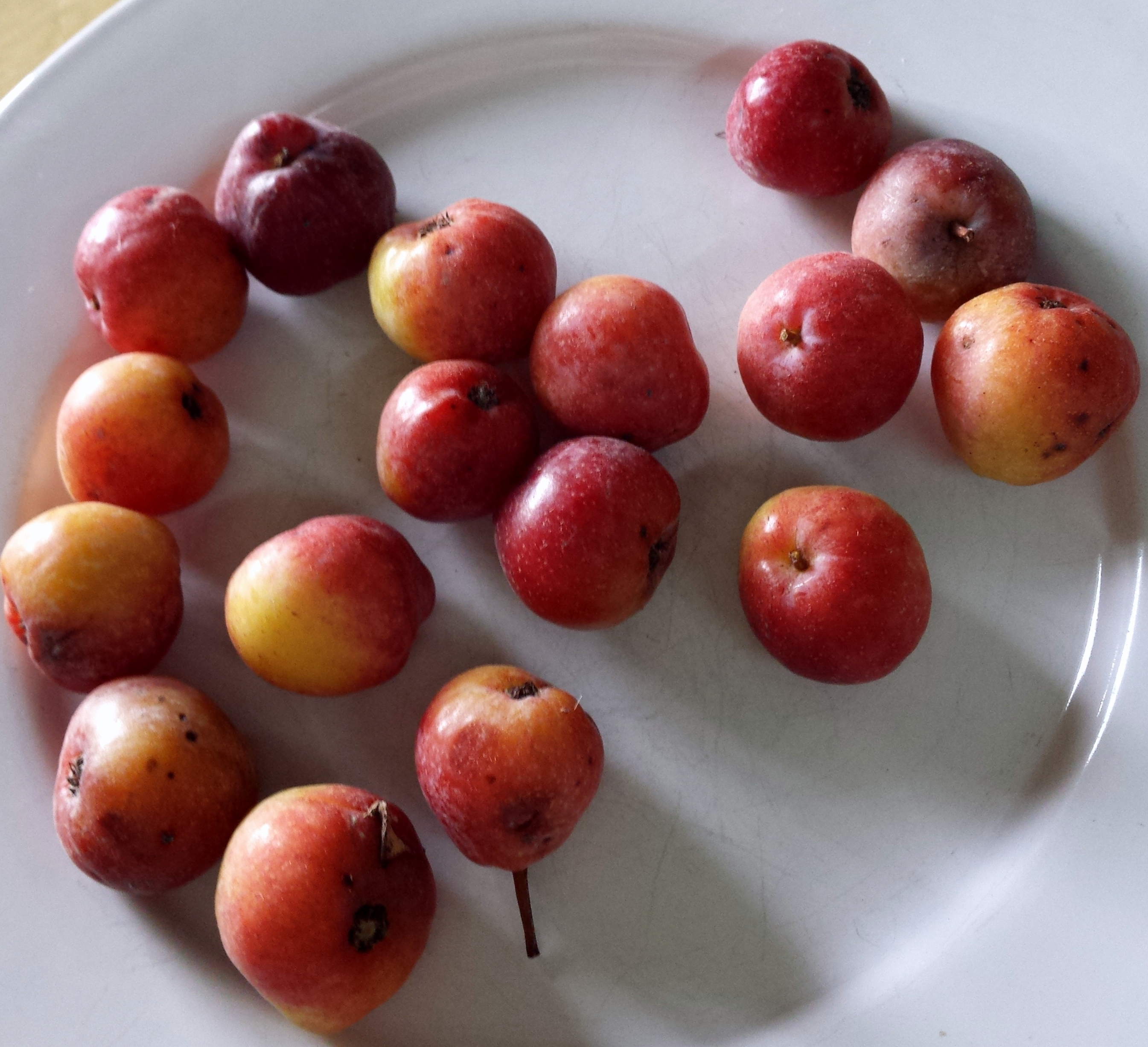
Some mature fruit

Cormus domestica is generally rare. In the UK, one very old tree that existed in the Wyre Forest before being destroyed by fire in 1862 used to be considered native, but it is now generally considered to be more likely of cultivated origin, probably from a mediaeval monastery orchard planting.

In the late 20th century, a small population of genuinely wild specimens was found growing as stunted shrubs on cliffs in south Wales (Glamorgan) and nearby southwest England (Gloucestershire). It is a very rare species in Britain, occurring at only a handful of sites. Its largest English population is within the Horseshoe Bend protected area at Shirehampton, Bristol. A further population has been discovered growing wild in Cornwall on a cliff in the upper Camel Estuary.

The tree can tolerate shade only in its first few years, requiring much light to mature. It is winter hardy and highly drought tolerant. In moister conditions, such as those in western Britain, the species can be affected by canker.

It is uncommon in Spain and listed as an endangered species in Switzerland and Austria.

== Uses ==
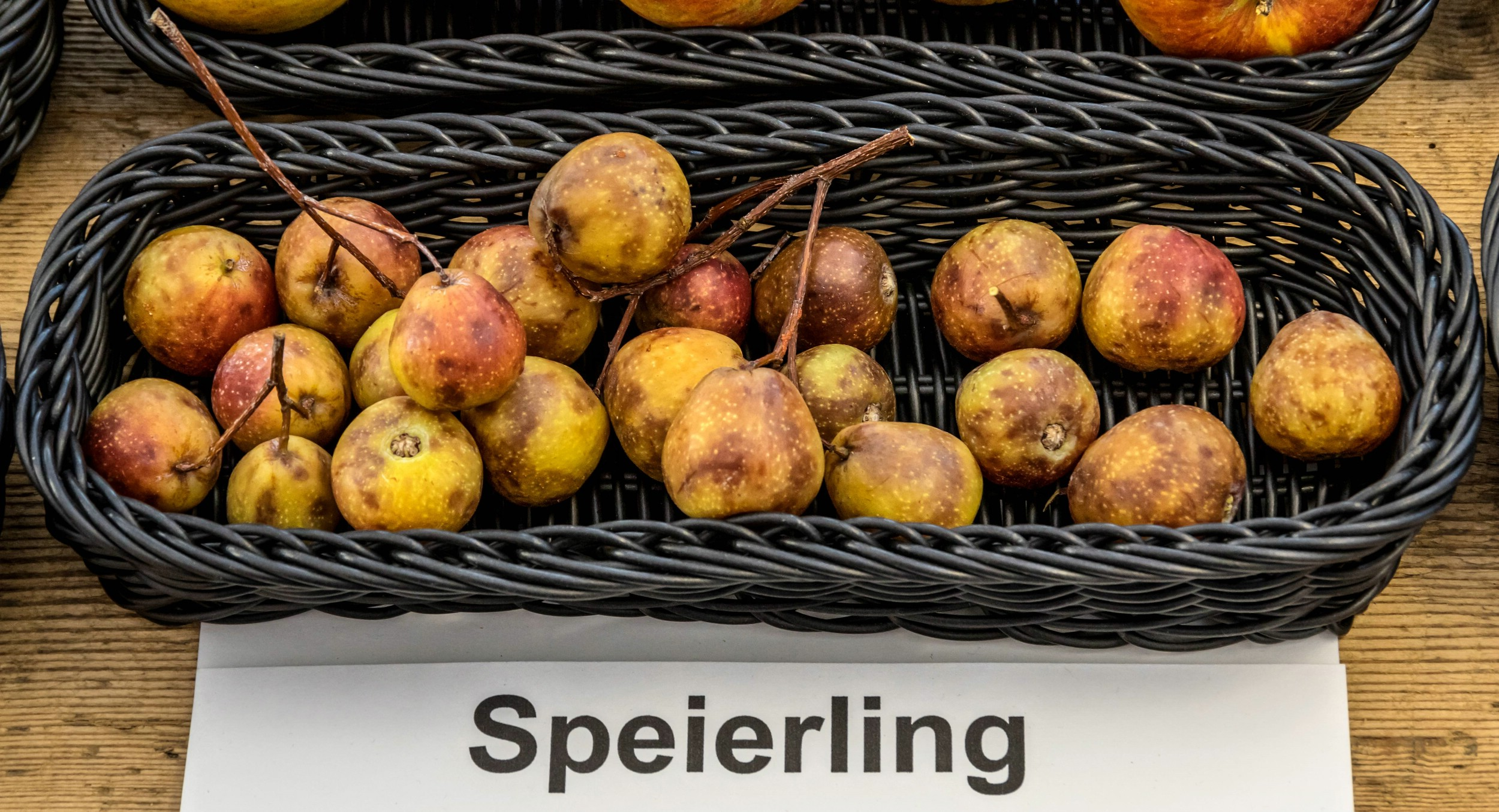
Fruit

The fruit is a component of a cider-like drink which is still made in parts of Europe. Although edible raw when it ripens mid-winter, it is highly astringent and gritty, but when left to blet (overripen) it sweetens and becomes pleasant to eat. In the Moravian Slovakia region of the Czech Republic, there is a community-run museum with an educational trail and a festival for this tree, with products like jam, juice and brandy made from its fruit.

In ancient Greece, the fruit was cut in half and pickled, which in Plato's Symposium (190d7-8) has Aristophanes use as a metaphor for the cutting in half of the original spherical humans by Zeus.

Service tree wood was often used for manufacturing wooden planes of all types used for working wood, because servicetree wood is fairly dense and holds a profile well.
