= Lamplighters Marsh =

Public open space in Bristol, England

Coordinates: 51.4824°N 2.6807°W

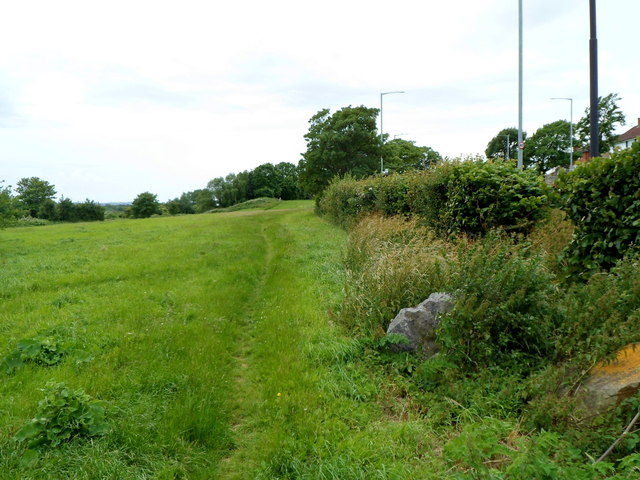
Track through The Daisy Field, Lamplighters Marsh

Lamplighters Marsh (grid reference ST524764) is a public open space and local nature reserve near Shirehampton in the city of Bristol, England. It is a narrow strip of land between the railway line which connects Bristol to Avonmouth, and the River Avon.

== Flora and fauna ==
Lamplighter's Marsh has two main types of vegetation: an area of marsh, which contains a varied plant community, including water parsnip and wild celery, and an area of wasteland which is also botanically notable, with species including narrow-leaved everlasting-pea. The Severn Way footpath and cycleway sits alongside the river, passing through Lamplighter's Marsh where the path is called the "yellow brick road". Viper's bugloss, moth mullein and hornet moth are among the scarce and notable species recorded at the site. The presence of the grass sea couch are a sign of the influence of the nearby Severn Estuary. Bee orchids grow in the area of grassland now known as the Daisy Field lying between the railway and the Portway. Local birdwatchers have recorded a number of species including common swift, Eurasian siskin, common redshank, Eurasian curlew, Eurasian sparrowhawk, great cormorant and goldcrest.

The site is designed a Site of Nature Conservation Interest and a Local Nature Reserve.

== History ==
Lamplighter's Marsh was utilised as grazing marsh up to the modern era. In the 18th century the small, brick-making village of West Town took up part of the site, it has gone now but is recalled in the name of the West Town Road. When the First World War broke out the British Army established a remount Depot at Shirehampton. The depot imported, trained and sent out horses on active service with the army and it was very large, extending from Station Road all the way to the Portway roundabout, including the area now known as the Daisy Field. In the Second World War Lamplighter's Marsh was used to tether barrage balloons which were to protect the nearby docks from bombing by the Luftwaffe and some of the concrete blocks used to anchor these balloons are still on the site. In the post-war years some of Lamplighter's Marsh became a landfill site and when this closed in 1976 the regeneration of the area started.
