= Redcliffe Bay =

Area of Portishead, Somerset, England

Coordinates: 51.475°N 2.801°W

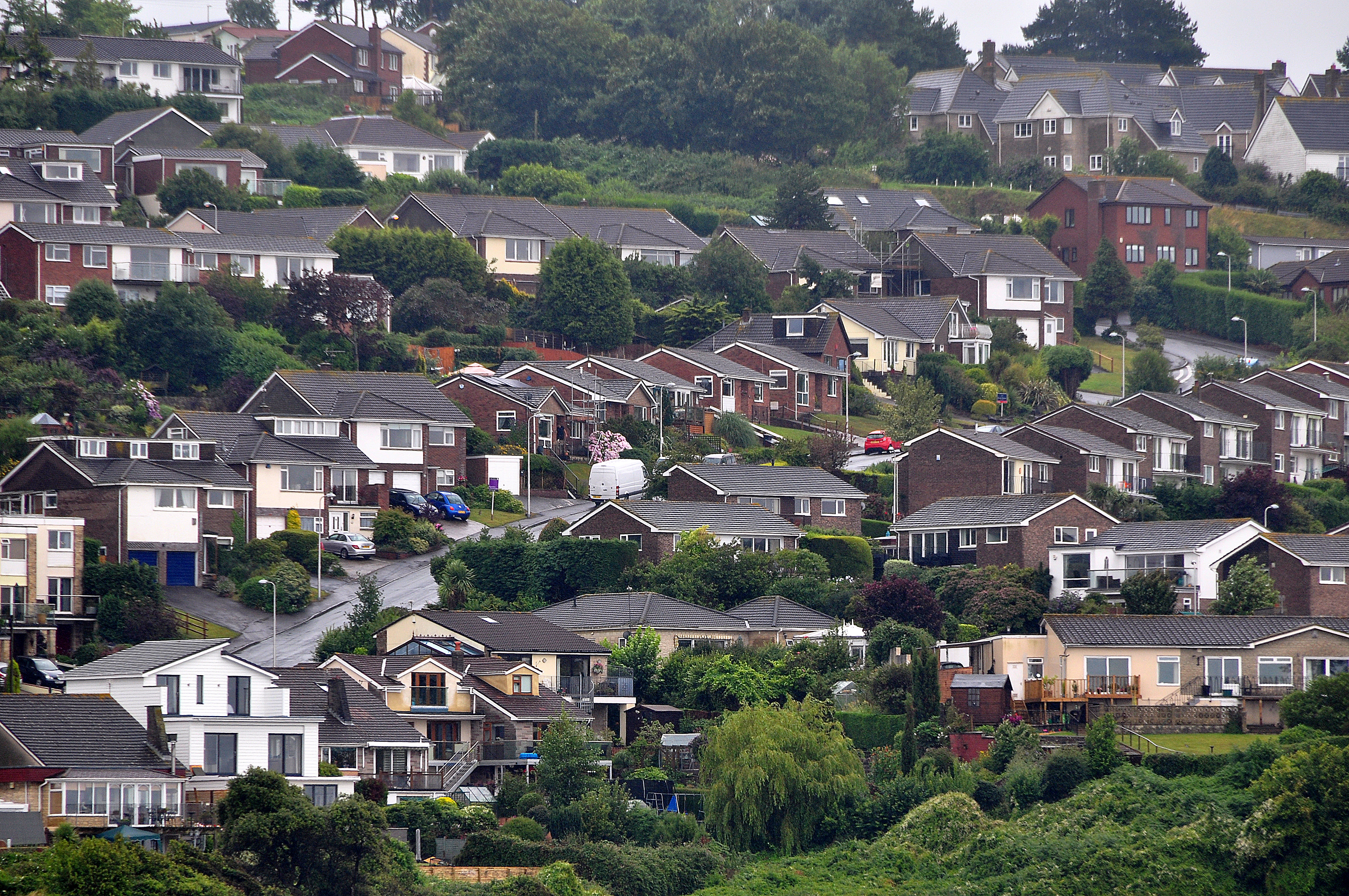
Housing in Redcliffe Bay

Redcliffe Bay is a large area of Portishead — a town in North Somerset, England — with most houses having views of the Bristol Channel. Despite its size, it is always considered part of Portishead (for example, in Town Councils).

The Anglican church of St Nicholas was built in 1911 and served as the chapel for the National Nautical School. The parish is within the Portishead benefice which is part of the Diocese of Bath and Wells.

The suburb also has a methodist church, and is home to a few shops and businesses on Queens Road, along with a popular hall that can be hired for private parties, etc. It has one pub, The Ship, which opened in 1973.

Some scenes of Broadchurch series 3 were shot here.
