= Shirehampton =

District of Bristol, England

Coordinates: 51.4945°N 2.6712°W

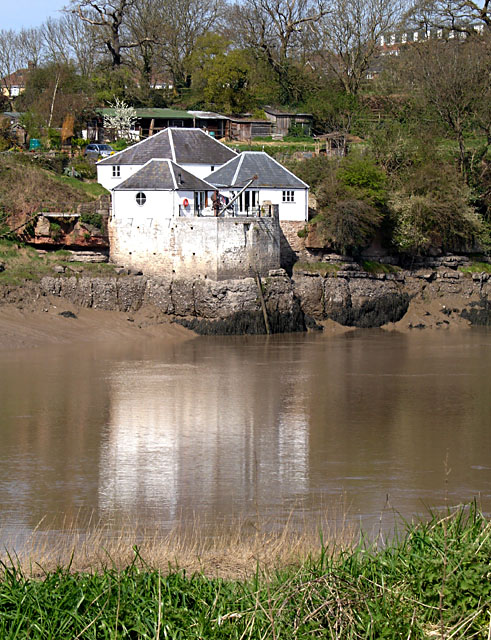
- The Old Powder Store, Shirehampton

- Location within Bristol
- OS grid reference: ST535775
- Unitary authority: Bristol
- Ceremonial county: Bristol
- Region: South West
- Country: England
- Sovereign state: United Kingdom
- Post town: BRISTOL
- Postcode district: BS11
- Dialling code: 0117
- Police: Avon and Somerset
- Fire: Avon
- Ambulance: South Western
- UK Parliament: Bristol North West

Shirehampton is a district of Bristol in England, near Avonmouth, at the northwestern edge of the city.

It originated as a separate village, retains a High Street with a parish church and shops, and is still thought of as a village by many of its 6,867 inhabitants. Although on the far northwest corner, and largely separated from the rest of Bristol by a broad swathe of parkland extending from the Blaise Castle estate, with the River Avon forming a barrier for access to Somerset, the community is still a convenient location from which to reach all parts of the city.

Travel is also easy from Shirehampton into Gloucestershire, South Wales and Somerset since it lies within reach of the main motorways in the area, including the M5, the M4 Second Severn Crossing, and the M49, and it is served by the A4 Portway and by Shirehampton railway station, which allow access to near the city centre. It is informally known to local people as "Shire".

== Situation ==
Shirehampton looks across the Avon towards the rural Failand Hills of Somerset. For many centuries the only direct connection with Somerset was via a small rowed ferry which crossed from near The Lamplighters pub ("The Lamps") to the village of Pill, Somerset opposite. This state of affairs continued until the completion of the M5 Avonmouth Bridge in 1974. From the limestone ridge of Penpole Point (whose name meant approximately Land's End in the Celtic language spoken here before English), there used to be far-reaching views across the River Severn to the distant hills of South Wales, but tree growth has restricted this prospect.

== Prehistory ==
The gravel terraces above the River Avon provide some of the earliest evidence of human occupation in the British Isles. Here and around Ham Green and Pill, on the opposite bank of the Avon, humans with a Lower Palaeolithic (earliest phase of the Old Stone Age) culture (possibly of the hominid type Homo heidelbergensis) left tools and debris behind some 250–400,000 years ago. For comparison, the well-known Palaeolithic sites at Waverley Wood, Warwickshire, and Boxgrove Quarry, Sussex, have artefacts from about 500,000 years ago, and Boxgrove has yielded bones of H. heidelbergensis.

== History ==
Shirehampton was originally a detached part of the parish of Westbury-on-Trym, separated from the main part of Westbury by a part of Henbury parish, which included Kingsweston, the great house, King's Weston House whose inhabitants have had a considerable impact on Shirehampton as employers and benefactors. The area is on record as part of the estate of "Stoke", which was granted by King Offa of Mercia to the bishop of Worcester in about 795, along with the district that is now called Stoke Bishop, and there are two later Anglo-Saxon documents about the same pieces of land.

Shirehampton was formerly a chapelry in the parish of Westbury-on-Trym, in 1866 Shirehampton became a separate civil parish, on 1 October 1904 the parish was abolished and merged with Bristol. In 1901 the parish had a population of 2570.

The place was originally called simply Hampton, meaning "large farming estate" or "farm enclosed on several sides", and later became known as "sharny Hampton", meaning "dungy Hampton". The name was "cleaned up" by the Elizabethans to its current form.

The village grew up around the lowest safe river crossing on the river Avon before it empties into the Severn. The ferry between the villages of Pill, Somerset, and Shirehampton, originally in Gloucestershire, connects a ridgeway along Kingsweston Hill (sometimes now called Abbot's Way) with the hills beyond the Avon and continues on towards Clevedon. The ferry ran until 1974, when it was superseded by the M5 bridge.

A priory of the Benedictine abbey of St Mary, Cormeilles, in Normandy, is sometimes said to have been established at Shirehampton in the early Middle Ages, and the converted fifteenth-century tithe barn in the High Street is believed to have belonged to the monastic estate. However, the place referred to in the Domesday Book of 1086 is certain to have been Kyre in Worcestershire, and there is no real connection between Shirehampton and Cormeilles apart from the building stones exchanged by the two communities in 1963 on the strength of the supposed historical connection.

The development of Shirehampton throughout the eighteenth century is closely associated with the history of the adjacent King's Weston House and its extensive estate. Much of the surrounding area was in the ownership of the Southwell family, owners of King's Weston and later to receive the title of Baron de Clifford. Shirehampton prospered through tourism as sightseers from Bath, Clifton and Bristol's Hotwells came to view Kings Weston and the famous views from Penpole Point.

Shirehampton became ecclesiastically separate in 1844 when the chapel of ease of St Mary, dating from at least Elizabethan times, was raised to parish church status. The original chapel building, about which nothing is known, had been replaced in 1727 and this had been rebuilt in 1827. This Gothic-style building burnt down in 1928 and was replaced by the current church, designed by Percival Hartland Thomas, which has a distinctive electronic carillon installed in 1959 with the aid of a benefaction from parishioner Mabel Creber.

There are three other churches in Shirehampton: Methodist, Baptist, and Roman Catholic.

During World War I, Shirehampton was the location of a remount depot for horses. This was the largest such depot in the country, with a capacity of up to 5,000 horses. These horses were mostly supplied from the US and Shirehampton was close to the new Royal Edward Dock at Avonmouth where they were landed. After some weeks of training, horses would then pass to the depot at Swaythling, from where they passed to France. 347,045 horses and mules passed through Shirehampton in the course of the war. After the war much of the materiel from the remount depot was bought by local builder Robert Stride who used it to develop Severn Beach. Robert was the cousin of Jared and Jethro Stride who developed Sneyd Park.

== Avonmouth ==
Avonmouth was a part of Shirehampton parish until 1917. It developed as the main element of the port of Bristol in the later nineteenth century, attracting workers to settle there and in Shirehampton proper; it had grown so big by 1917 that it was given separate status, for both ecclesiastical and civil purposes. Shirehampton itself expanded considerably in the later nineteenth century, and was absorbed, with Avonmouth, by the city of Bristol in 1904. After World War I, the city built a great deal of social ("council") housing here, and this has largely determined the present character of the place.

Along the High Street there remains a sprinkling of the larger houses which typified the place before 1900, often (like Twyford House and The Wylands) converted to public or commercial use; some have been demolished and replaced by small infill estates (like Sunny Hill); some have been retained and surrounded by other houses (such as Penlea and the former vicarage partly retaining some of the supposed priory's construction); and some have gone altogether like the ancient house of sixteenth-century appearance, which has been lost to road widening and a row of 1960s shops.

== Benefactions ==
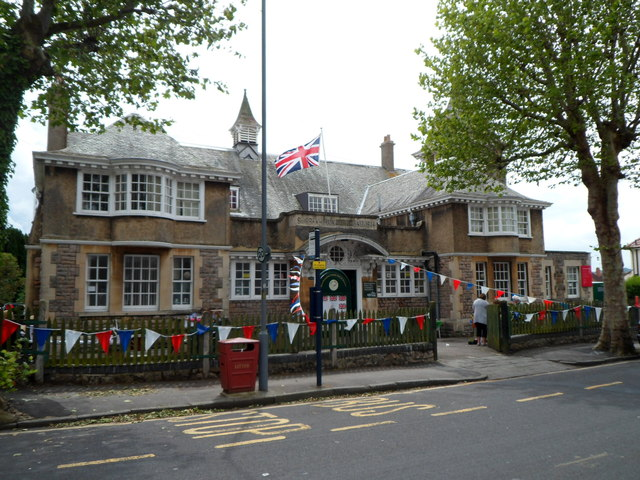
Shirehampton Public Hall

As Shirehampton and Avonmouth grew, the squires of Kings Weston House, notably Philip Napier Miles (1865–1935), gave many benefactions to the district, including land for churches, war memorials and social amenities. Among these important gifts was the Public Hall of 1904, whose main claim to fame is perhaps that it was the venue of the first performance of Vaughan Williams's rhapsody The Lark Ascending, in its original version for solo violin and piano, played by the violinist Marie Hall, a friend of Vaughan Williams from his visits to Kings Weston house, in 1920. Little Park (or Shirehampton Park) was given to the National Trust after World War I, and is used as a golf course.

== Amenities ==
Shirehampton is well provided with churches, schools, sporting facilities, shops and pubs. It has public open spaces and antiquities nearby. These include Kingsweston Roman Villa (whose ruins are visible by the roadside in the modern suburb of Lawrence Weston), Blaise Castle Estate, and Blaise Castle House Museum, in addition to Shirehampton Park. Shirehampton Football Club, based at Penpole Lane, in Shirehampton and play in the Jewson Western League at Step 6.

== Other antiquities ==
On the banks of the River Avon stands the Old Powder House. It was built in 1775-6 to store gunpowder, which was not allowed into Bristol docks. It is a grade II listed building. The village war memorial stands by Shirehampton Road north of the golf course, not far from the site of the now dry Rush Pool, a pool formerly used by drovers bringing cattle from Wales across the Severn to market in Bristol.

== Ecology ==
Shirehampton, in particular the woodland overlooking Horseshoe Bend in the Avon (a National Nature Reserve), is the main location for rare plant species including the true service tree (Sorbus domestica) and two other whitebeams, Sorbus eminens and Sorbus anglica. The nationally scarce large-leaved lime (Tilia platyphyllos) also occurs, as it does elsewhere in the Severn basin, and rare herbaceous plants include field garlic (Allium oleraceum) and pale St. John's-wort (Hypericum montanum). The narrow saltmarsh below the wood contains two nationally scarce vascular plant species, slender hare's-ear (Bupleurum tenuissimum) and long-stalked orache (Atriplex longipes).

The Lamplighters Marsh Site of Nature Conservation Interest is also within the boundaries of Shirehampton.

== Local people ==
- Samuel Seyer (1757–1831), an early historian of the City of Bristol, is buried in Shirehampton churchyard.
- Archibald Sayce (1846–1933), Professor of Assyriology at Oxford University from 1891 to 1919, was born in Shirehampton. He was an extremely productive scholar with many significant publications.
- Philip Napier Miles (1865–1935), composer of music and philanthropist, lived all his life at Kingsweston House and owned much of the land on which Shirehampton and Avonmouth are built.
- Gilbert Jessop (1874–1955), cricketer and later in his life a writer, lived on The Green, Shirehampton, from 1909–13.
- Rotha Mary Clay (1878–1961), social worker and medieval historian, lived and worked in Shirehampton, at Ilex Cottage, High Street.
- Sir Robert Stephens (1931–1995), a leading English actor in the early years of Britain's Royal National Theatre was born in Shirehampton. He was one of the most respected actors of his generation and was at one time regarded as the natural successor to Laurence Olivier.
- Elizabeth Kelly (Liz Tilberis) (1947–99), successively editor-in-chief of British Vogue and Harper's Bazaar, is said by most sources to have been born in Shirehampton.

The novelist Evelyn Waugh (1903–66) is known to have visited both Shirehampton, where his mother had lived, and Kingsweston House in the 1950s, whilst researching his autobiography, but his memory seems to have been confused. He wrote of his visit in a postcard to a friend, Francis Beaufort Palmer. Waugh's mother lived at Priory House, 61 Pembroke Road. In his book A Little Learning, Waugh writes:

Her rustic tastes were formed by her childhood at Shirehampton, where she and her sister were sent from India at an age which left them no memories of their place of birth, to the care of two maiden great-aunts and a bachelor great-uncle, a retired sailor. It was by these great-aunts and in this house, the Priory [this is misleading, because The Priory was not Priory House], that my grandfather had been detected with his rosary. Shirehampton is now a suburb of Bristol. The Priory has become a vicarage [correct; the vicarage was The Priory, but a new vicarage was built in the grounds of The Priory in 1951, and neither of these was Priory House] and its meadows have been overbuilt. In my mother's childhood the place was rural and my mother was entirely happy there. All her life she looked back on that elderly ménage as the ideal of home.

In less than ten years from the book's publication in 1964, Priory House and the new vicarage had been demolished, but The Priory is still there.

== Trivia ==
In the 1960s and 1970s a Dalek sat outside the Haven Master's building on the banks of the river Avon, just across from the Lamplighters public house. The Dalek used to face up river, so that boats coming from Bristol Docks to the Severn and Bristol Channel (not to mention the Pill Ferry) would have to pass under its manipulator arm. The Dalek was used to raise funds during at least one Shirehampton Carnival in (probably) the very late 1960s. For 6d, children could sit inside it on the plain wooden slat and twiddle the manipulator arm for a few minutes apiece.

Both the Dalek and the Pill Ferry (as well as 'The Cockle Lady', who used to sell cockles in the High Street during the 1960s) are featured in the not-quite-children's book, Tabitha Miggins: Ship's Cat (on the Pill Ferry), by Shirehampton author, Mark Jones (writing as Philippa Perry). Note that the photograph on the rear jacket of the follow-up book, Further Adventures of Tabitha Miggins, Ship's Cat on the Pill Ferry (this time attributed to Mark Clinton Jones), shows a painted-out direction post in Pill that points the way to the "Shirehampton Ferry". This is a bit of a misnomer because it was known as 'the Pill ferry' on both sides of the river.

Laura Kidd, then performing under the moniker "She Makes War" and now known as "Penfriend", filmed scenes for the music video for her 2018 single "Devastate Me" in Shirehampton, Bristol. Locations featured in the video include the area outside Shirehampton Post Office on Park Street and the Lamplighters pub

== See also ==
- Avonmouth
- Bristol
- Horseshoe Bend, Shirehampton
- Kings Weston House
- Philip Napier Miles

== References and sources ==
- Bates, M.R. (2003) A brief review of deposits containing Palaeolithic artefacts in the Shirehampton Area of Bristol and their regional significance. Brecon: TerraNova.
- Bates, M.R, and F.F. Wenban-Smith (2005) Palaeolithic research framework for the Bristol Avon basin. Bristol City Council.
- Helme, Judy (2004) Shirehampton Public Hall 1904–2004. Shirehampton Public Hall Committee.
- Higgins, David H. (2004) The Roman town of Abona and the Anglo-Saxon charters of Stoke Bishop of AD 969 and 984. Bristol and Avon Archaeology 19, 75–86.
- Sawyer, P.H., ed. (1968) Anglo-Saxon charters. London: Royal Historical Society.
- Shire on the Web. April 1999 edition. Irene Base 'The Illuminated Address'
- Smith, A.H. (1964) The place-names of Gloucestershire, vol. 3. Cambridge: Cambridge University Press (Survey of English Place-Names vol. 40).
- Thomas, Ethel (1983) Shirehampton story. Privately published (2nd end 1993).
- Thomas, Ethel (2002) The continuing story of Shirehampton. Privately published.
