= Clifton Bridge railway station =

Former railway station in England

Clifton Bridge
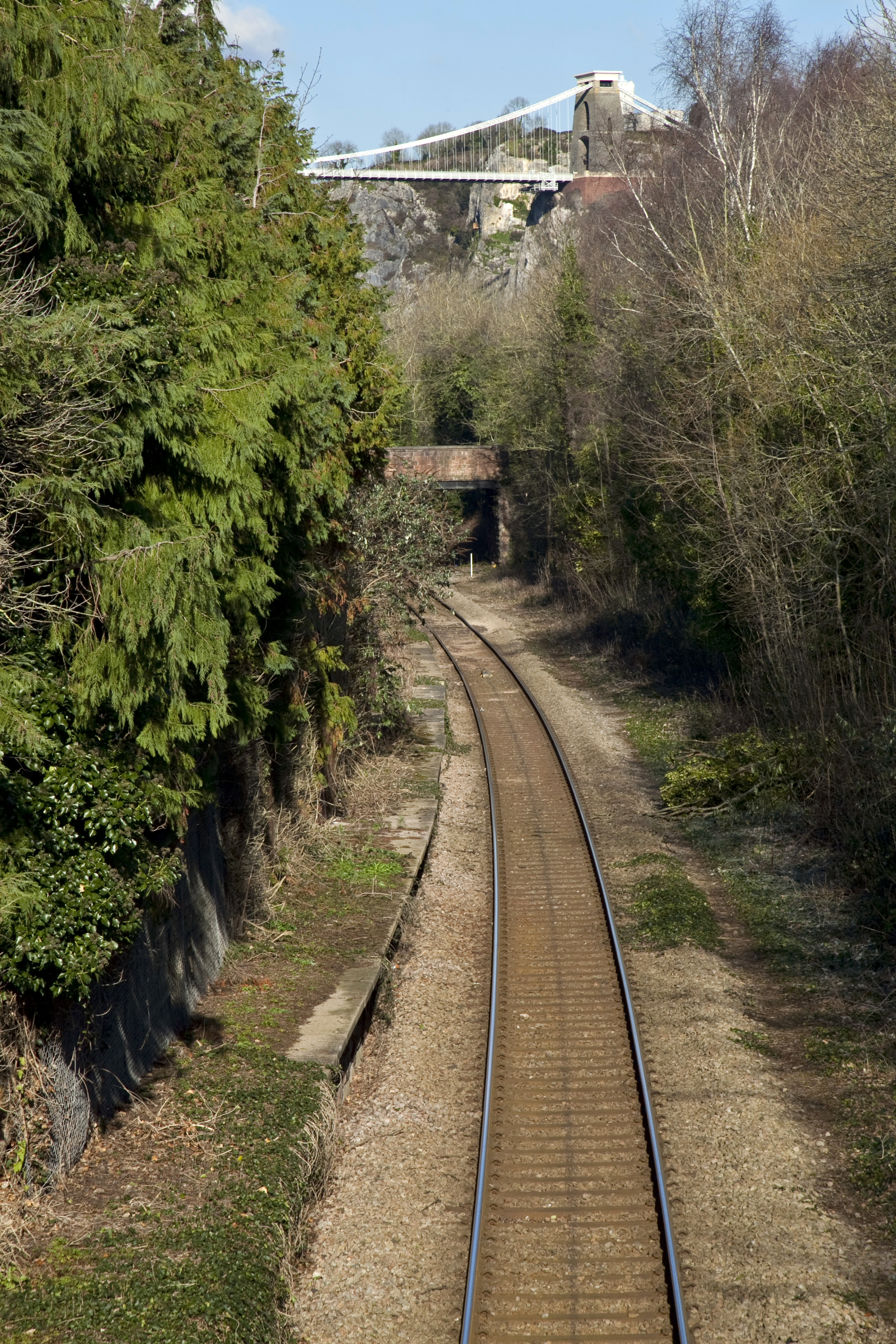
- The station site in 2012

General information
- Location: Bower Ashton, City of Bristol; England
- Coordinates: 51.44677°N 2.62573°W
- Platforms: 2

Other information
- Status: Disused

History
- Original company: Bristol and Portishead Pier and Railway Company
- Pre-grouping: Great Western Railway
- Post-grouping: Great Western Railway

Key dates
- 18 April 1867: Opened
- 15 September 1880: Second platform added
- March 1891: Renamed as Rownham (Note: Although Oakley states that the station was renamed from Clifton Bridge to Rownham and back again, Butt's book on stations does not acknowledge this change.)
- 1910: Renamed as Clifton Bridge
- 7 September 1964: Closed to passengers
- 5 July 1965: Closed to goods
Location

Clifton Bridge railway station is a former railway station in the Bower Ashton district of Bristol, England, near the River Avon. It was opened in 1867 by the Bristol and Portishead Pier and Railway Company as a single platform stop 3.4 miles (5.5 km) along the line from Bristol to Portishead. It was later taken over by the Great Western Railway and had a second platform added.

Passenger services at the station declined following the Second World War, and the Beeching Report recommended the complete closure of the Portishead line. Passenger services at Clifton Bridge ended on 7 September 1964, with goods services following on 5 July 1965, although the line saw occasional traffic until 1981. Most of the station was demolished, leaving some remains of the platforms, a retaining wall and the footbridge. Regular freight trains through the station began to run again in 2002 when Royal Portbury Dock was connected to the rail network. The line is due to be reopened to passenger traffic as part of MetroWest, but there are no plans to reopen the station.

== History ==
Clifton Bridge railway station was opened on 18 April 1867 by the Bristol and Portishead Pier and Railway Company, when services began on their line from the Bristol and Exeter Railway at Portishead Junction (Note: The junction between the Bristol to Exeter line and Portishead Railway was known as Portishead Junction until 1932, after which it was known as Parson Street Junction.) to a pier on the Severn Estuary at Portishead. The line was built as 7 ft (2,134 mm) broad-gauge, and was largely single track. The station was sited in Bower Ashton at the southern end of the Avon Gorge, at the bottom of Rownham Hill and near the western bank of the river. The station, which took its name from the nearby Clifton Suspension Bridge, was 8 miles 42 chains (13.7 km) from the line's terminus at Portishead, (Note: The location of the terminal pier is an estimate.) 3 miles 32 chains (5.5 km) from Bristol Temple Meads and 121 miles 63 chains (196.0 km) from the Great Western Railway's terminus at London Paddington. (Note: Railways in the United Kingdom are, for historical reasons, measured in miles and chains. There are 80 chains to the mile.) To the north, the railway ran along the riverbank in the gorge, and to the south through fields just outside the Bristol conurbation. The station was initially the first along the line from Portishead Junction, before Portbury.

When it opened, the station had a single platform, on the west side of the track. Road access was through a large forecourt to the west from Clanage Road / Rownham Hill, now the A369. There was a two-storey building facing the road, the ground floor of which had a single long room, partitioned into a waiting room, booking office and station master's office. The ground floor also housed a coal-fired boiler and washing facilities, while upstairs was spacious living accommodation accessed by a private staircase. A single north-facing bay platform for goods vans was at the north end of the station. The station was noted as having an excellent garden alongside the platform. The nearby Rownham Ferry allowed passengers to cross the river to Hotwells and Clifton. Services on the Portishead railway were operated by the Bristol and Exeter Railway, with six trains per day in each direction on weekdays and one on Sundays. The operation of these transferred to the Great Western in 1876, when they took over the Bristol and Exeter, and in 1884 the Great Western took ownership of the Bristol and Portishead. The station was visited by Albert Edward, Prince of Wales, in 1878.

The station saw major works at the beginning of the 1880s. From 24 to 27 January 1880, the line was relaid as 4 ft 8 1/2 in (1,435 mm) standard gauge, and on 15 September 1880 a passing loop was brought into use through the station, east of the original track, with a new platform serving it. The new platform had a large shelter and a small signal cabin immediately south of the shelter, with a footbridge at the south end linking it to the original platform. Both platforms had "half barrel" canopies added. The new "down" platform served trains towards Bristol, while the original "up" platform now served trains towards Portishead. The double track through the station was extended to Portishead Junction from 1883. The station's name was changed to Rownham in March 1891, but reverted to Clifton Bridge in 1910. In 1899 the station was flooded to a depth of several feet (one metre), as were other parts of Bristol. A new signal box with 27 levers was built at the south end of the western platform, with the original cabin taken out of use from 25 August 1907. The signal box contained three token instruments, connected to the line's other signal boxes at Oakwood, Pill and Portishead, so that the Pill or Oakwood boxes could be switched out. The boxes at Clifton Bridge and Portishead were staffed 24 hours a day. By 1889, services had increased to nine trains in each direction on weekdays and one on Sundays, and from 1909 this increased to 13 on weekdays and two on Sundays.

In June 1914, the station played a major role in bringing passengers to the Bristol International Exhibition, known locally as the White City, held on Ashton Meadows to the south-east of the station. The exhibition came to an early end due to the outbreak of the First World War, as the buildings were used for troop barracks. The station had earlier that year seen the discovery of a decapitated corpse, later identified as prominent local solicitor Edward Payne Press. The death was ruled a suicide by means of lying down in front of a train. The war saw the establishment of a mule depot, which handled mule traffic from the docks before the animals were transported to military installations such as at Shirehampton or Salisbury Plain. From 1917 the station was closed on Sundays as a wartime economy measure.

After the war, services increased, and from 8 July 1929 a half-hourly service operated along the line: two trains per hour to Portishead, one to Ashton Gate and one to Bristol Temple Meads, equating to 21 trains per day on weekdays. On Sundays eight trains per day operated. There were eight staff assigned to the station in the 1930s, and in 1944 three carriage sidings were laid at the south end of the station.

The Portishead line again saw a rise in use during the Second World War, as Bristolians evacuated to the more rural areas of Pill and Portishead commuted in to work, many alighting at Clifton Bridge and walking across the Cumberland Basin bridges, the Rownham Ferry now obsolete. During air raids, people would sleep aboard carriages in the station sidings, or in Clifton Bridge No. 1 tunnel north of the station. The station was also used during the war for timber traffic from the local woodlands, loaded onto trains by members of the Women's Land Army. Other freight traffic included goods from the Ashton Containers factory and a local firm dealing in herbal medicine.

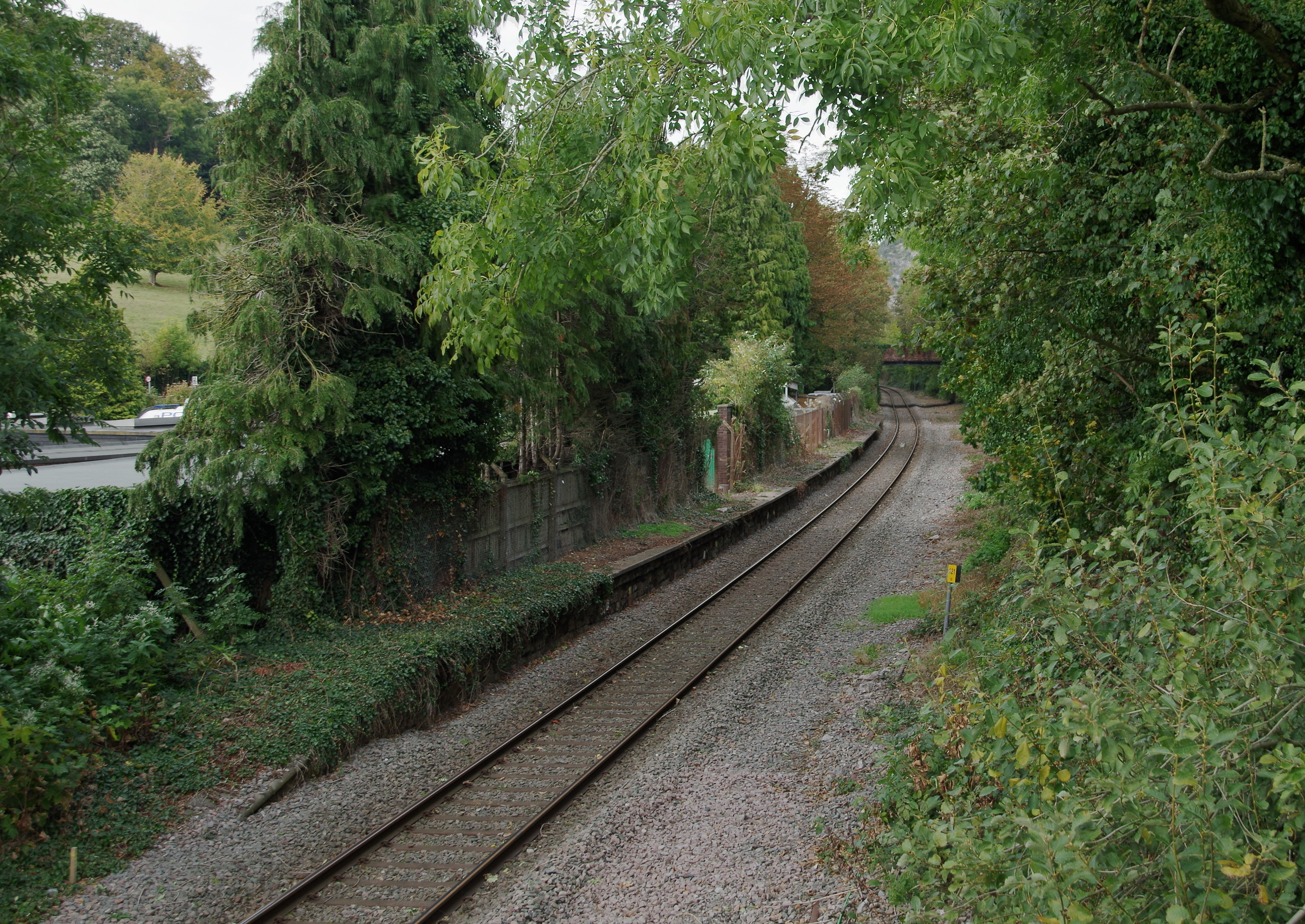
The station was taken out of service and mostly demolished in the 1960s, but certain parts, such as the western platform, are still visible.

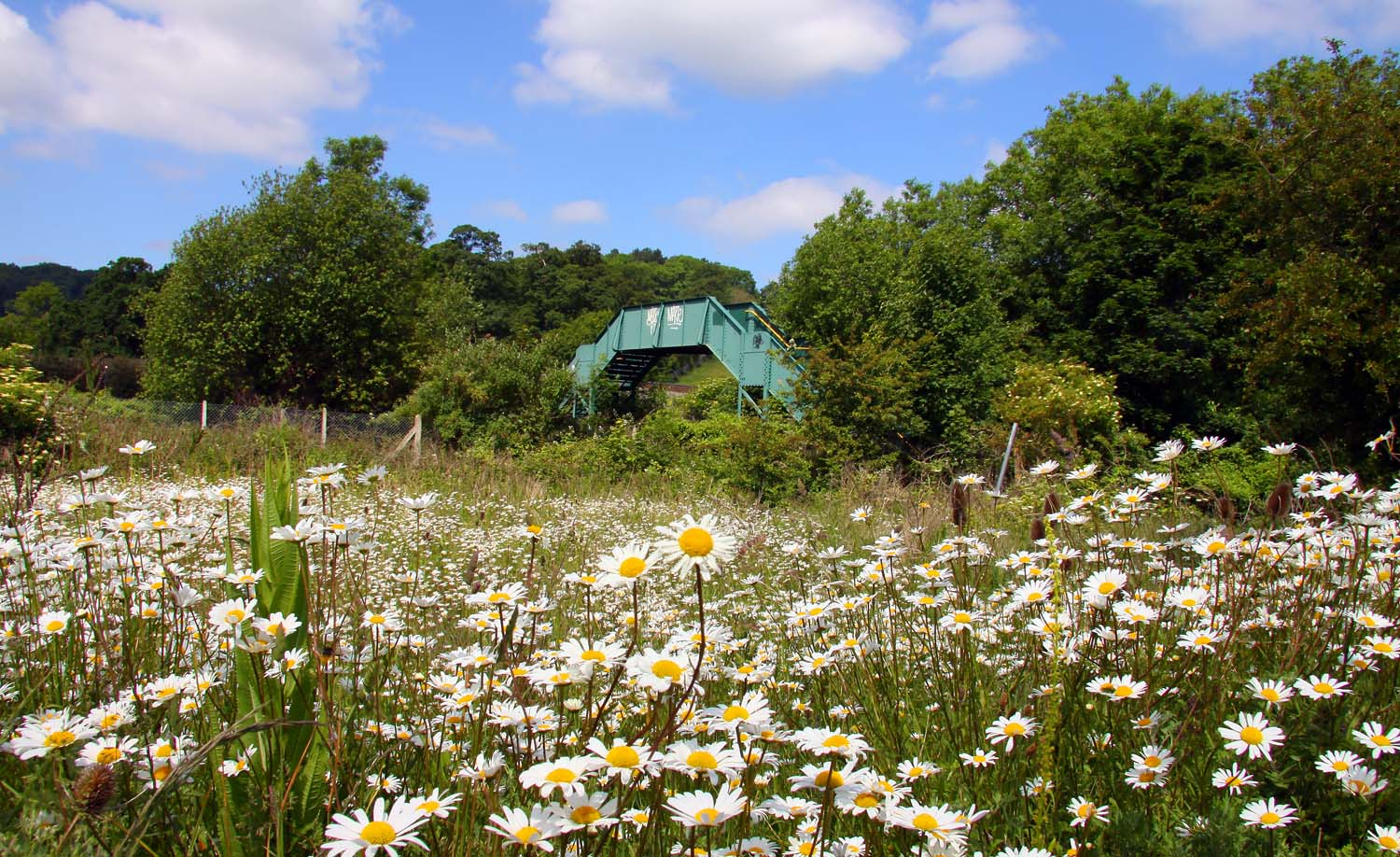
The station footbridge now carries a footpath over the railway.

When the railways were nationalised in 1948, Clifton Bridge came under the aegis of the Western Region of British Railways. Services had reduced by 1949 to 13 trains per day on weekdays and seven on Sundays, and passenger numbers fell. The station became an unstaffed halt from 29 October 1962, and in 1963, the Beeching report suggested the complete withdrawal of services along the line. Passenger services at Clifton Bridge were ended on 7 September 1964, with goods services ending the next year on 5 July 1965. In the final year of passenger operation, there were only six trains on weekdays and none on Sundays. One of the carriage sidings had been taken out of service in 1964, and the others followed in 1966. The line through the site was reduced to single track in 1965, and the signal box was closed on 4 November 1966. The station buildings were mostly demolished, and the site became the headquarters of the Avon and Somerset Constabulary Mounted Police and Dog Section. Part of the western platform remained in situ, as did the retaining wall of the eastern platform shelter. The station footbridge became part of a footpath. Freight trains continued to pass through the station, but their number decreased over time, with the line falling out of regular use from 30 March 1981. The route however was kept intact by British Rail, with occasional freight trains, and in 2002 a single track was relaid to allow rail access to Royal Portbury Dock.

Preceding station	Historical railways	Following station
Bristol Temple Meads	Bristol and Exeter Railway; Portishead Railway (1867–1871)	Pill (Line open, station closed)
Bedminster	Bristol and Exeter Railway; Portishead Railway (1871–1876)	Pill (Line open, station closed)
Bedminster	Great Western Railway; Portishead Railway (1876–1906)	Pill (Line open, station closed)
Ashton Gate (Line open, station closed)	Great Western Railway; Portishead Railway (1906–1926)	Pill (Line open, station closed)
Ashton Gate (Line open, station closed)	Great Western Railway; Portishead Railway (1926–1928)	Ham Green Halt (Line open, station closed)
Ashton Gate (Line open, station closed)	Great Western Railway; Portishead Railway (1928–1932)	Nightingale Valley Halt (Line open, station closed)
Ashton Gate (Line open, station closed)	Great Western Railway; Portishead Railway (1932–1947)	Ham Green Halt (Line open, station closed)
Ashton Gate (Line open, station closed)	Western Region of British Railways; Portishead Branch Line (1948–1964)	Ham Green Halt (Line open, station closed)

== Future ==
The Portishead Branch Line is to be reopened as part of the MetroWest scheme, a rail transport plan which aims to enhance transport capacity in the Bristol area. The scheme was given the go-ahead in July 2012 as part of the City Deal, whereby local councils would be given greater control over money by the government. A consultation on the plans was held between 22 June and 3 August 2015 to gather views from the community and stakeholders before moving on to detailed designs. Due to the additional capital costs, the line will not be electrified, but the design will include passive provision for future electrification. The station at Clifton Bridge is not being considered for reopening, but the line in the area will be increased to double track. Subject to final business case approval, construction work is expected to start on the line in December 2021 and then take around two years to complete.

Trains along the reopened line will operate between Portishead and Bristol Temple Meads, with two trains per hour in each direction. Services would call at Pill and Parson Street, with aspirations to also call at Bedminster and a reopened Ashton Gate. Trains could also be extended on to the Severn Beach Line. The trains used will be diesel multiple units, likely three carriages long. The line will be operated as part of the Greater Western passenger franchise. Great Western Railway, a subsidiary of FirstGroup, currently operates the Greater Western franchise, however their present contract expires before services to Portishead are likely to start.
