= Rownham Ferry =

Ferry service in Bristol, England

Coordinates: 51.4480°N 2.6248°W

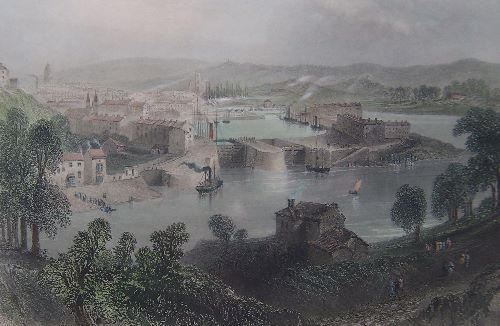
The ferry and entrance to Bristol Docks circa 1841.

The Rownham Ferry was a boat service across the River Avon in Bristol, England. It began operations by the twelfth century and ceased in 1932 after the construction of bridges across the river.

The ferry crossed the River Avon at the southern end of the Avon Gorge, between Bower Ashton on the western side of the river and Hotwells on the east. The ferry was in operation by the 12th century, and may have previously been a fording point at low tide. The original endpoints were two inns - the New Inn in Bower Ashton and the Rownham Tavern in Hotwells.

In the early 16th century a second ferry service was established in competition to that run by St Augustine's Abbey (now Bristol Cathedral). The case was heard in the star chamber.

Around 1600, the ferry is marked on John Speed's maps as "Rounam Pasage" or "Rownam Passage". In 1793 the ferry was identified as being used by many passengers to "cross the river at Rownham ferry and walk to the sweet and wholesome village of Ashton to eat strawberries and cream".

When the Portishead Railway was built in 1866, the ferry became popular with users of Clifton Bridge railway station.

The ferry was moved in 1873 due to the expansion of Cumberland Basin, with new slipways built on both sides of the river. At low tide, the crossing was a bridge of boats rather than a ferry. The toll was 1d, due to the tidal nature of the crossing and the need to clean the slipways of mud after each high tide. The ferry ceased operation on 31 December 1932. The slipways are still occasionally visible at low tide.
