= Portbury Shipyard railway station =

Disused railway station in Easton-in-Gordano, North Somerset

Portbury Shipyard

General information
- Location: Easton in Gordano, North Somerset; England
- Coordinates: 51.4812°N 2.7059°W
- Grid reference: ST510760

Other information
- Status: Disused

History
- Original company: Great Western Railway
- Pre-grouping: Great Western Railway
- Post-grouping: Great Western Railway

Key dates
- 16 September 1918: Opened
- 26 March 1923: Closed
Location

Portbury Shipyard railway station served the village of Easton in Gordano, North Somerset, England, from 1918 to 1923 on the Portishead Railway.

== History ==
The station was opened on 16 September 1918 by the Great Western Railway. It closed on 26 March 1923.

| Preceding station | Disused railways | Following station |
|---|---|---|
| Portbury; Line and station closed | Great Western Railway; Portishead Railway | Pill; Line and station closed |
