= Pill railway station =

Former railway station in North Somerset, England

Pill
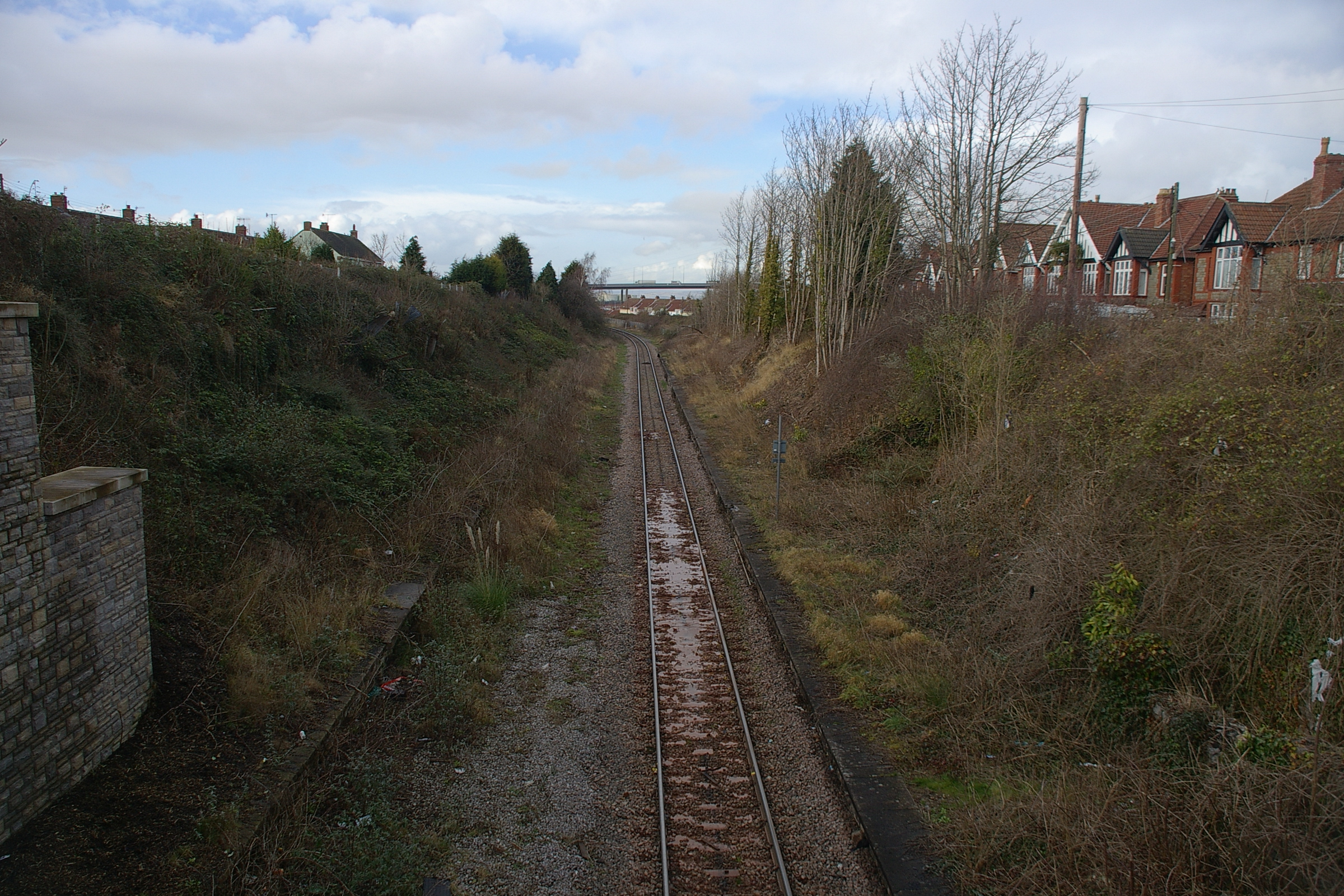
- The site of the former Pill railway station in 2009, looking west towards Portishead.

General information
- Location: Pill, North Somerset; England
- Coordinates: 51.4809°N 2.6866°W
- Grid reference: ST524760
- Platforms: 2

Other information
- Status: Under construction

History
- Original company: Bristol and Portishead Pier and Railway
- Pre-grouping: Great Western Railway
- Post-grouping: Great Western Railway

Key dates
- 18 April 1867: Opened
- 10 June 1963: Closed to goods traffic
- 7 September 1964: Closed to passengers
- Late 2028 / early 2029: Due to be reopened
Location

Pill railway station was a railway station on the Portishead Branch Line, 7.8 miles (12.6 km) west of Bristol Temple Meads, serving the village of Pill in North Somerset, England. The station was opened by the Bristol and Portishead Pier and Railway Company on 18 April 1867. It had two platforms, on either side of a passing loop, with a goods yard and signal box later additions. Services increased until the 1930s, at which point a half-hourly service operated. However the Portishead Branch was recommended for closure by the Beeching report, and the station was closed on 7 September 1964, although the line saw freight traffic until 1981. Regular freight trains through the station began to run again in 2002 when Royal Portbury Dock was connected to the rail network.

The station is due to be reopened to passenger traffic by early 2029, as part of MetroWest, a scheme to increase rail services in the Bristol area. The new station will have a single platform, an accessible footbridge and a car park, with trains running between Portishead and Bristol. As of October 2026, the station is under construction.

== History ==
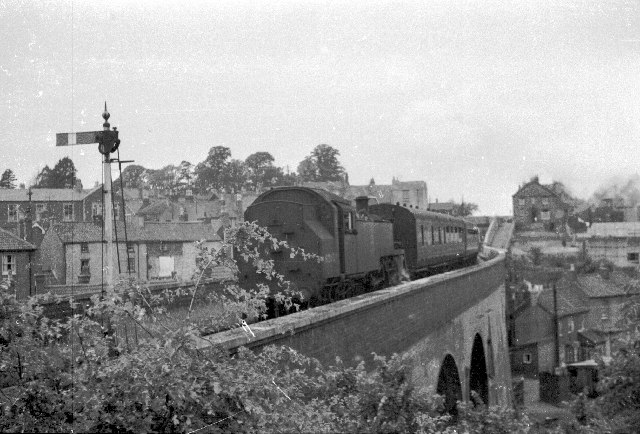
A train crosses the Pill Viaduct in 1960. This is a service from Portishead, which has just left Pill.

Pill railway station was opened on 18 April 1867 by the Bristol and Portishead Pier and Railway Company, when services began on their line from the Bristol and Exeter Railway at Portishead Junction (Note: The junction between the Bristol to Exeter line and Portishead Railway was known as Portishead Junction until 1932, after which it was known as Parson Street Junction.) to a pier on the Severn Estuary at Portishead. The station served the village of Pill on the south bank of the River Avon. The line was built as 7 ft (2,134 mm) broad-gauge, and was largely single track. The station was sited in a cutting close to the old centre of Pill, 3 miles 73 chains (6.3 km) from the line's terminus at Portishead, (Note: The location of the terminal pier is an estimate.) 7 miles 61 chains (12.5 km) from Bristol Temple Meads and 126 miles 12 chains (203.0 km) from the Great Western Railway's terminus at London Paddington. (Note: Railways in the United Kingdom are, for historical reasons, measured in miles and chains. There are 80 chains to the mile.) To the east, the railway passed through the village and crossed a valley on the brick-built Pill Viaduct, while to the west the line was largely through flat, open countryside. The station was initially the second along the line from Portishead Junction, after Clifton Bridge and before Portbury.

The station at Pill was aligned roughly north-west/south-east, with the line bridged to the east by Station Road and Myrtle Hill. There were two platforms, separated by two running lines, forming a passing loop. The southern "down" platform was for trains towards Portishead, the northern "up" platform for trains towards Bristol. Each platform was provided with a brick shelter and steps up to Station Road. The station building was sited on Station Road, west of the platforms.

There were initially six trains per day in each direction on weekdays and one on Sundays, operated by the Bristol and Exeter Railway. The Great Western took over the Bristol and Exeter in 1876, and in 1884 took over ownership of the Bristol and Portishead. Services increased to nine trains per day on weekdays by 1889. The line was relaid as 4 ft 8 1/2 in (1,435 mm) standard gauge in 1880, coinciding with a lengthening of the platforms, and by 1909 there were 13 trains per day on weekdays and two trains on Sundays.

The double track loop through the station was extended at both ends in March 1912, with the platforms also extended. A small goods yard and coal depot was built at the north-west end of the station at the same time. A signal box was built on the southern platform at the end of the First World War. By 1929, services had increased to 21 trains per day on weekdays and eight per day on Sundays. This allowed a train every half-hour, with one train per hour running to Bristol Temple Meads and the other terminating at Ashton Gate. Passenger traffic was mainly commuters, to both Bristol and Portishead, as well as people who wished to use the Pill ferry across the river to Shirehampton. During the Second World War, many evacuees from Bristol commuted into the city from Pill. The station staff at this time consisted of a station master, two porters and two female signallers.

When the railways were nationalised in 1948, Pill came under the aegis of the Western Region of British Railways. Passenger services had reduced by 1949 to 13 trains per day on weekdays and seven on Sundays. In 1963 the Beeching report suggested the complete withdrawal of services along the line as a cost-saving measure, and so goods services at Pill were ended on 10 June 1963; with the station closing completely on 7 September 1964. In the final year of operation, there were only six trains on weekdays and none on Sundays. Freight trains continued to pass through the station, but their number decreased over time, and the line fell out of regular use after 30 March 1981. The line however was kept intact by British Rail, with occasional freight trains, and in 2002 a single track was relaid to allow rail access to Royal Portbury Dock, which brought regular freight traffic. At this time remnants of both platforms could be seen and the station buildings were in commercial use.

Preceding station	Historical railways	Following station
Clifton Bridge (Note: Clifton Bridge was known as Rownham from 1891 to 1910.) (Line open, station closed)	Bristol and Exeter Railway; Portishead Railway (1867–1876)	Portbury (Line and station closed)
Clifton Bridge (Line open, station closed)	Great Western Railway; Portishead Railway (1876–1918)	Portbury (Line and station closed)
Clifton Bridge (Line open, station closed)	Great Western Railway; Portishead Railway (1918–1923)	Portbury Shipyard (Line and station closed)
Clifton Bridge (Line open, station closed)	Great Western Railway; Portishead Railway (1923–1926)	Portbury (Line and station closed)
Ham Green Halt (Line open, station closed)	Great Western Railway; Portishead Railway (1926–1947)	Portbury (Line and station closed)
Ham Green Halt (Line open, station closed)	Western Region of British Railways; Portishead Railway (1948–1962)	Portbury (Line and station closed)
Ham Green Halt (Line open, station closed)	Western Region of British Railways; Portishead Railway (1962–1964)	Portishead (Line and station closed)

== Future ==
A computer rendering of how a reopened Pill railway station would look, as seen from the south.

The Portishead Branch Line is to be reopened as part of the MetroWest scheme, a rail transport plan which aims to enhance transport capacity in the Bristol area. The scheme was given the go-ahead in July 2012 as part of the City Deal, whereby local councils would be given greater control over money by the government. There had been calls for the line to reopen, primarily due to traffic congestion on the A369, which is the only route from Portishead to Bristol. A consultation on the reopening plans was held between 22 June and 3 August 2015 to gather views from the community and stakeholders before moving on to detailed designs. Due to the additional capital costs, the line will not be electrified, however the design will include passive provision for future electrification.

In April 2019 the Department for Transport committed £31.9m to cover the shortfall in finance for MetroWest Phase 1, meaning that funding has now been secured. In November 2019 North Somerset Council submitted a Development Consent Order (DCO) application to the Planning Inspectorate, which seeks powers to build and operate the disused section of railway from Portishead to Pill, gain environmental consent to undertake works to the existing freight railway through the Avon Gorge and obtain powers for the compulsory acquisition of land. The Secretary of State for Transport is expected to make a decision within 18 months. Subject to final business case approval, construction work had been expected to start on the line in December 2021 and then take around two years to complete. Approval was given again in November 2022.

As part of the works, Pill station will be reopened. Trains both to and from Portishead will use the southern platform, which will be resurfaced and provided with a waiting shelter, lighting, passenger information displays and audible announcements. The northern platform, adjacent to the current single track line to Royal Portbury Dock, will not be reinstated, however the track will be retained for freight trains. The two tracks will have a junction east of the station.

Initial plans for the station were for access to be from Monmouth Road, which runs parallel to the railway, north of the line. There was to be a fully accessible footbridge across the line, with both ramp and stairs, as well as a pedestrian crossing across Monmouth Road and a lit 50-space car park on the old goods yard at the eastern end of Monmouth Road. The very end of the goods yard would be maintained for Network Rail access. These plans were changed following an agreement to acquire a property on Station Road. The new plans have the entrance to be on Station Road, at the east end of the site, meaning there would be no need for a footbridge. There would be disabled parking and a pick up/drop off point adjacent to the entrance, although the exact design of this area is still under consideration. Noise mitigation options are to be investigated and there will be improvements to local footpaths.

It is expected that reopening the station will result in reduced car usage to and from Pill and the surrounding villages. Most station users will walk to the station, with the next largest share being car drivers and car passengers being dropped off, followed by cyclists and bus users. Some parking restrictions are proposed to prevent rail users parking on the local streets, which are narrow and not suitable for widening.

Trains along the reopened line will operate between Portishead and Bristol Temple Meads, with two trains per hour in each direction. Services would call at Pill and Parson Street, with aspirations to also call at Bedminster and a reopened Ashton Gate. Trains could also be extended on to the Severn Beach Line. The trains used will be diesel multiple units, likely three carriages long. The line will be operated as part of the Greater Western passenger franchise. Great Western Railway, a subsidiary of FirstGroup, currently operate the Greater Western franchise, however their present contract expires before services to Portishead are likely to start.

As of October 2026, work is underway to construction the new station, which involves widening the cutting, building a platform and put in a place a second track.

Preceding station	Future services	Following station
Parson Street	Greater Western franchise Portishead Branch Line	Portishead

== See also ==
- MetroWest
