= Pill, Somerset =

Village in Somerset, England

Coordinates: 51.4787°N 2.6859°W

Pill
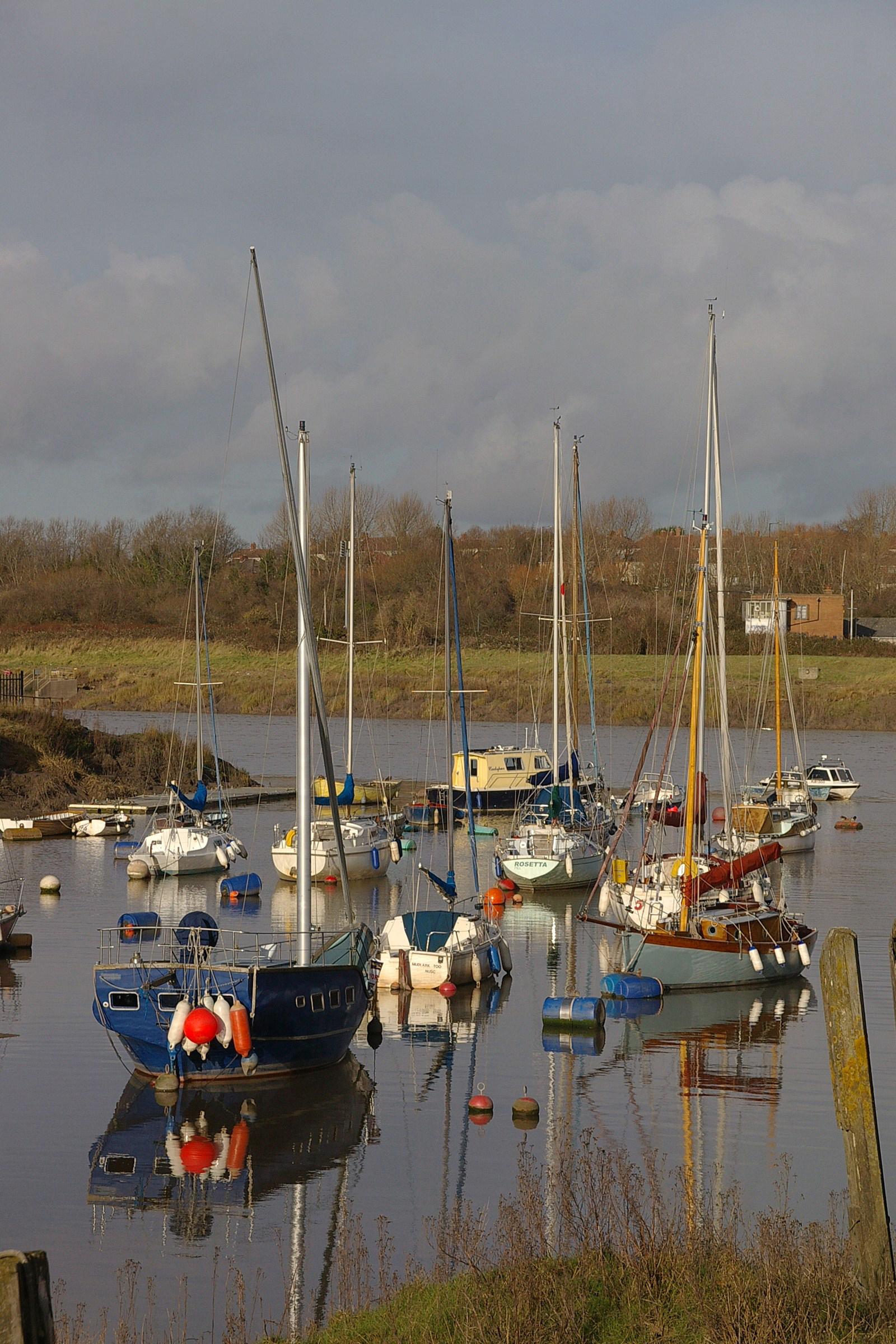
- Crockerne Pill

- Location within Somerset
- OS grid reference: ST524757
- Civil parish: Pill and Easton-in-Gordano
- Unitary authority: North Somerset
- Ceremonial county: Somerset
- Region: South West
- Country: England
- Sovereign state: United Kingdom
- Post town: BRISTOL
- Postcode district: BS20
- Dialling code: 01275
- Police: Avon and Somerset
- Fire: Avon
- Ambulance: South Western
- UK Parliament: North Somerset

Pill is a village in North Somerset, England, situated on the southern bank of the Avon, about 4 miles (6 km) north-west of Bristol city centre. The village is the largest settlement in the civil parish of Pill and Easton-in-Gordano (until 2011 named Easton in Gordano). The former hamlets of Lodway and Ham Green are now contiguous with Pill, and the village of Easton in Gordano is nearby. The parish extends northwest beyond the M5 motorway to include the Royal Portbury Dock.

== History ==
The name "Pill" comes from the Welsh word Pîl which denotes a tidal inlet or harbour. The later name Crockerne Pill (literally 'pottery wharf') arose from the fact that an industrial-scale pottery thrived nearby. The Ham Green Pottery kiln was excavated in 1959 and is located in the fields above Chapel Pill. The pottery was made in the period from 1100 AD to 1250 AD and was exported from Pill by boat.

The so-called 'Ham Green' pottery has been found and identified in archaeological digs from the Algarve in Portugal to Iceland. It is an important archaeological 'dating tool' because the period of manufacture is so precise. Bristol City Museum has a good selection of pottery artefacts from the site and other locations showing the unique decoration and form of Ham Green pottery but the only item on display is a large jug at the M Shed.

The town was traditionally the residence of pilots, who would guide boats up the Avon Gorge, between the Bristol Channel and the Port of Bristol. The port moved in the 20th century to Avonmouth and the Royal Portbury Dock. Pill was once home to 21 public houses and was known as being a rough place, to the extent that the founder of the Methodist Church, John Wesley, says in an entry in his journals for 3 October 1755:

I rode over to Pill, a place famous from generation to generation, even as Kingswood itself, for stupid, brutal, abandoned wickedness.

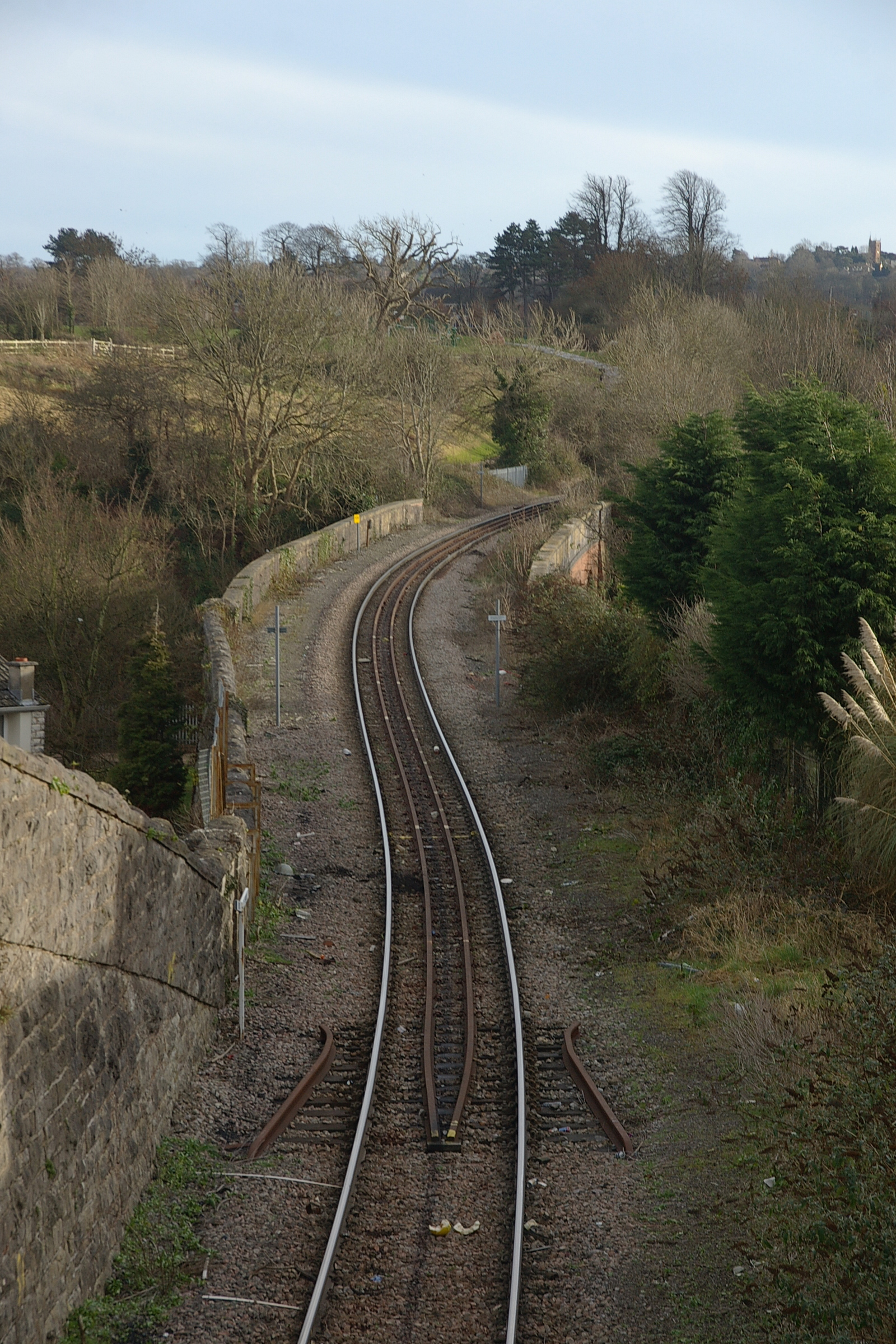
The Portishead Railway viaduct in Pill.

The 1860s saw the building of the Portishead Railway line between Bristol Temple Meads and Portishead. The line, which was opened to passengers in 1863, passed right through the village of Pill, with the result that a large number of buildings had to be demolished to allow its necessary straight and level passage.

The railway also consumed many acres of farm land during its construction. However, it brought new life to the area, not to mention new blood as many of the navvies working the line met and married local girls and stayed on to raise their families after the line was completed. They brought new names, some of which are still with us today, over 100 years on.

The small ferry from Pill to Shirehampton closed because of loss of trade once the opening of the Avonmouth Bridge in 1974 enabled pedestrians to walk over the Avon. So a transport link to and from the parish of Easton-in-Gordano, one that had survived since Medieval times, was closed and the river mud has swallowed up most of the now unattended slipways. The village and its vanished ferry are commemorated in the Adge Cutler and The Wurzels song "Pill Pill".

In 1971 the Royal National Lifeboat Institution stationed an inshore lifeboat at Pill. It was withdrawn in 1974.

== Amenities ==
The parish has four places of worship: St George's, Easton-in-Gordano; Christ Church, Pill; The Salvation Army and Pill Methodist Church.

Pill has several shops in the centre for day-to-day needs, including two Southern Co-operative food stores, pharmacy, Post Office, vets and hair salon. Pill has several take-away restaurants; however, it can no longer boast 21 pubs and currently has only three: The Kings Head, The Duke and the Pill Memorial Club, although this excludes the nearby pubs in Easton in Gordano.

It is commonly used as a place for commuting to Bristol as it has transport links, being close to the M5 and Bristol. Pill railway station, which closed in 1964, is due to reopen by 2026.

Pill marks the start of the National Cycle Network 33 (the Wessex Cycleway), which also takes in Clevedon, Weston-super-Mare, Bridgwater, Chard and Seaton.

Clubs and Societies – Easton-in-Gordano Table-Tennis Club (meets Thursday nights) has been running since 1956 when the Church Memorial Hall was opened. The Luncheon Club provides a weekly get together for the elderly on Thursdays at the Community Centre. The village is proud of all its community activities full details of which are included in the Community Diary held at the Resource Centre (Precinct).

== Governance ==
An electoral ward with the same name exists. It has the same area and the population taken at the 2011 census was 3,525.

== Schools ==
- St Katherine's School, located at Ham Green within Abbots Leigh parish, not actually in Pill, with approximately 1,000 students aged 11–18.
- Crockerne Primary School, which is located in the village and caters for Nursery to Year 6 pupils. The school has one of North Somerset's first children's centres, officially opened on 1 July 2006, as well as a small, indoor, heated swimming pool and an active PTA.

== Transport ==
=== Road ===
Pill is situated on the A369 between Bristol and Portishead, and is also near the M5, linking Pill with places such as Weston-super-Mare, Exeter and Birmingham.

=== Public transport ===
As of December 2023, Pill is served by the First West of England route X4, which operates between Bristol bus station and Portishead.

Pill used to have a railway station, which was opened in April 1867, on the route between Bristol Temple Meads and Portishead, but this station was closed in September 1964 due to the Beeching cuts. However, the station is set to reopen alongside the route between Bristol and Portishead as part of the MetroWest plans.

== Ham Green Hospital ==
In 1894 Bristol Council purchased Ham Green House, a large country house with land at Ham Green for use as an isolation hospital, to replace a hospital ship (Margareda) moored in the Port of Bristol. It opened as a hospital in 1899 with 76 beds and was periodically expanded; by 1950 it had 500 beds available for TB patients alone. In 1978 it was selected as the 'Regional Infectious & Exotic Diseases Unit', covering the whole of south-west England and parts of South Wales. It was largely closed in the 1990s. Bristol Archives holds records of Ham Green Hospital (and its predecessor institutions) including medical officers' records, letter books, patient lists and patient registers (Ref. 38224) (online catalogue). The original Ham Green House is now the home of Penny Brohn UK, while much of the rest of the site was redeveloped for housing and the Eden Office Park.

== Notable individuals ==
- Hicks Withers-Lancashire (1829–1909), also known as Hicks Withers, a veterinary surgeon.
- Bertram Thomas (1892–1950), diplomat and explorer.
- Noel Newsome (1906-1976), the BBC European Service director between 1941 and 1944.
- Sadik Al-Hassan (born 1984), politician and pharmacist, MP for North Somerset since 2024, lives locally.
