= Clifton Bridge =

Clifton Bridge may refer to:

- Clifton Bridge (Nottingham), United Kingdom
- Clifton Bridge (York), United Kingdom
- Clifton Suspension Bridge, Bristol, United Kingdom
  - Clifton Bridge railway station, a former railway station built to serve the bridge
