= Ham Green Halt railway station =

Former railway station in England

Ham Green Halt
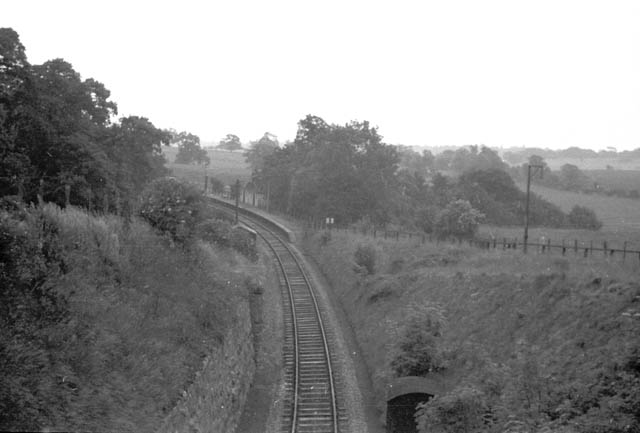
- The station in 1960

General information
- Location: Pill, North Somerset; England
- Coordinates: 51.4767°N 2.6710°W
- Grid reference: ST535755
- Platforms: 1

Other information
- Status: Disused

History
- Original company: Great Western Railway
- Post-grouping: Great Western Railway

Key dates
- 23 December 1926: Opened
- 1928: Extended
- 7 September 1964: Closed
Location

Ham Green halt, Bristol

Ham Green Halt was a railway station near Bristol, England, on the Portishead Railway, opened in 1926 to serve Ham Green Hospital.

== History ==
The station was opened by the Great Western Railway on 23 December 1926.

The station was closed by British Railways on 7 September 1964.

Preceding station	Historical railways	Following station
Nightingale Valley Halt; Line open, Station closed	Great Western Railway; Portishead Railway	Pill; Line open, Station closed
