= Nightingale Valley Halt railway station =

Former railway station in England

Nightingale Valley Halt

General information
- Location: Leigh Woods, North Somerset; England
- Coordinates: 51.4561°N 2.6303°W
- Grid reference: ST563732
- Platforms: 1

Other information
- Status: Disused

History
- Original company: Great Western Railway
- Post-grouping: Great Western Railway

Key dates
- 9 July 1928: Opened
- 12 September 1932: Closed
Location

Nightingale Valley halt, Bristol

Nightingale Valley Halt was a railway station near Bristol, England, on the Portishead Railway. It was situated approximately 190 metres north-west of the Clifton Suspension Bridge, and was for the benefit of visitors to Leigh Woods. It opened on 9 July 1928, and closed on 12 September 1932. No significant traces of the station survive today.

Preceding station	Historical railways	Following station
Clifton Bridge; Line open, Station closed	Great Western Railway; Portishead Railway	Ham Green Halt; Line open, Station closed
