= Bristol International Exhibition =

1914 exhibition in Bristol, England

Coordinates: 51.446°N 2.625°W

The Bristol International Exhibition was held on Ashton Meadows in the Bower Ashton area of Bristol, England in 1914. The exhibition which had been planned since 1912 was a commercial venture and not fully supported by the civic dignitaries of the city which caused difficulties raising the funds needed. Most of the construction of the venues was from wooden frames covered by plasterboard and occurred in just 2 months prior to opening. It opened on 28 May 1914 was closed on 6 June. Further funding was raised and the exhibition reopened, but continued to struggle with lower than expected attendance and, following several court hearings, finally closed on 15 August just after the outbreak of World War I.

The site covered 30 acres (12 ha) next to the River Avon and was served by two railway stations. The venues included: an International Pavilion and a concert hall, a replica of Bristol Castle, a representation of "Old Plymouth" with a replica of the Revenge and the Dominions Pavilion. Other attractions included a Scenic Railway roller coaster and buildings representing "Shakespeare's England". The entire site was lit by electric lighting including the Pageant Ground which had a grandstand holding 4,000 people.

After the premature closure of the exhibition the site was used, until 1919, as barracks for The Gloucestershire Regiment. Some buildings became warehouses after the troops left but all had been demolished before World War II when the site was again used for troops and then squatters housing. There are no structures on the site which is now used for allotments, a cricket club and the horse and dog section of Avon and Somerset Constabulary. In 2022 construction started on housing on part of the site.

== Planning ==
Plans for the exhibition were laid in 1912. The initial directors were local business leaders, but they were soon replaced by the merchant John Bellham and theatre artist and director Leolyn Gustav Hart who had been involved in The Festival of Empire which was held at The Crystal Palace in London in 1911, to celebrate the coronation of King George V. The idea was to hold a colonial exhibition to encourage local business and trade with the British dominions. Support from some of the leaders of the city's civic leaders was limited as many were already involved in organising the annual exhibition of the Royal Agricultural Society of England which was to be held in Bristol in 1913 on Durdham Down.

In 1913 shares were issued in the company and the rental of the site was agreed with the owners, the city corporation (7 acres (2.8 ha)) and the Great Western Railway (23 acres (9.3 ha)). Publicity for the event was distributed to newspapers in April 1913 and extensive coverage detailed plans for the exhibition buildings, concerts, music competitions and pageants. The pageants were planned by John Henderson and themed around the history of Bristol during the periods 875–1373, 1486–1663 and 1764–1831. A cast of 1,200 local people was planned.

The company planning the exhibition raised funds from a variety of backers based on accounts which projected an income of £186,882 which would include entrance fees from 2 million visitors, and expenditure of £145,966 including £59,000 construction costs. Clearance of the site started at the end of 1913 but was then delayed until March 1914 after the finance had been agreed. During the two months before the exhibition was due to open in May, an average of 2,000 workers per week employed by the Westminster Construction Company Ltd were on site.

== Site ==
The site, which was also known as Ashton Fields or Rownham Fields as well as Ashton Meadows, covered 30 acres (12 ha) and was served by two railway stations Clifton Bridge railway station and Ashton Gate railway station which was renamed Exhibition Station for the duration of the event. The triangular site was bordered by the River Avon on the north, a road called Ashton Avenue on the east and the railway tracks on the west, with a bridge over the other set of railway tracks running across the site. Each of the exhibition halls was built of a timber frame cladded with plasterboard and mouldings made from fibre and gypsum given them a white appearance and it became known locally and in some press reports as the White City.

The major buildings included the International Pavilion and a concert hall with a capacity of 5,000. A replica of Bristol Castle was erected at the northern end of the site to hold military exhibits next to the Dominions Pavilion which was intended to showcase the products of the dominions. South of these was the Pageant Ground with seating for 4,000 in the grandstand. Other exhibits included a Scenic Railway roller coaster and buildings representing "Shakespeare's England", designed by Jennie Cornwallis-West (better known as Lady Randolph Churchill), which had been successfully exhibited at Earls Court Exhibition Centre in 1912. The electric lighting which was installed by the Bristol Corporation Electricity Department, was still innovative and expensive. It involved over 5 miles (8.0 km) of cable including under the river.

== Exhibition ==
Although incomplete the exhibition was officially opened on 28 May 1914 by John Swaish the lord mayor of Bristol. The day included tours for journalists, a concert and choir followed by a firework display.

Visitors entered the exhibition via an avenue of murals on canvas representing agriculture, trade landscapes or culture from Rhodesia, India, Australia and Malaysia. They then passed over a foot bridge over the railway and approached the International Pavilion which was 150 feet (46 m) high and covered a floor space of 65,000 square feet (6,000 m^{2}). It held exhibits related to industry and manufacturing. The next section included the Egyptian gardens and colonnade. The music pavilion could hold 4,000 customers, with a large dance floor, an orchestra and space for a choir of up to 1,200. The pleasure side of the exhibition included the figure of eight roller coaster, a jungle area where the performances included lions, and entertainments such as a hall of mirrors and rifle range. "Shakespeare's England" consisted of "old-world" architecture and was adjacent to the "Dominions Garden" with its bandstand close to the Dominions Pavilion and a fine arts gallery. Near the replica of Bristol Castle was a representation of "Old Plymouth" with a replica of the Revenge the flagship of Francis Drake against the Spanish Armada.

== Financial problems ==
On 6 June, just eight days after the official opening, Leolyn Hart closed the exhibition and told workmen who were still finishing some of the displays not to come into work. Gate receipts were poor and the original funding of £100,000 had been exhausted. The debenture holders wanted the exhibition to stay open to try to recoup some of their losses. Arthur Collins was appointed as the receiver and attempted to raise further funds from local supporters. It reopened on 10 June and further funding was obtained from backers in London. New managers were appointed who criticised Bristolians for not backing the exhibition. Although a winding-up order had been submitted by a creditor, on 26 June the receiver announced that further money had been raised and plans for additional attractions were in place. Daily pageants and a variety of lectures were included in the programme.

The daily pageants ran from 29 June to 18 July but failed to recoup the initial outlay. A further court hearing was held on 20 July and the company responsible for the exhibition was wound up, although it stayed open and attendances increased. The exhibition closed for good on 15 August soon after the declaration of hostilities which became the First World War.

== Subsequent use ==
After closure the buildings were then used for troop barracks and a drill hall by troops from 'Bristol's Own' the 12th Battalion The Gloucestershire Regiment. The last troops left the site in January 1919 and the equipment sold off. During the 1920s some of the buildings were used as warehouses, but were removed by the 1930s. In World War II the site was again used for barracks for troops, and in the post war period squatted by those made homeless during the bombing of the Bristol Blitz. All of the buildings have since been removed. The site is now used for sports pitches including the Bedminster Cricket Club, the White City Allotments and the former horse and dog section of Avon and Somerset Constabulary.

== Bibliography ==
- Burlton, Clive (2014). Bristol's Lost City: Built to Inspire Transformed for War. Bristol Books. ISBN 978-1-909446-05-2.
- Oakley, Mike (2006). Bristol Railway Stations 1840–2005. Redcliffe. ISBN 1-904537-54-5.
