= Ashton Vale =

Suburb of Bristol, England

Coordinates: 51.432°N 2.627°W

- Location within Bristol
- OS grid reference: ST565705
- Unitary authority: Bristol
- Region: South West
- Country: England
- Sovereign state: United Kingdom
- Post town: BRISTOL
- Postcode district: BS3
- Dialling code: 0117
- Police: Avon and Somerset
- Fire: Avon
- Ambulance: South Western
- UK Parliament: Bristol South

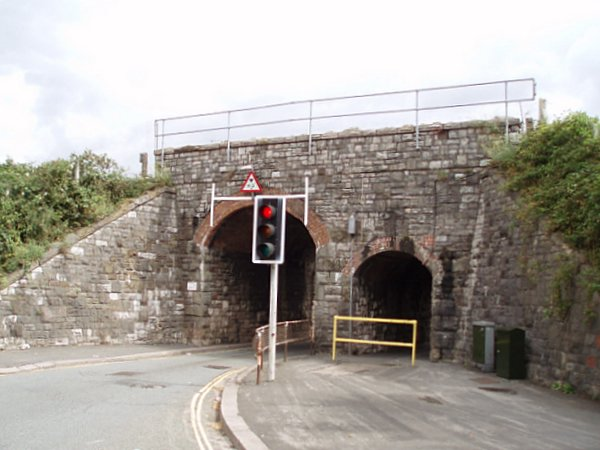
A railway bridge on Ashton Drive

Ashton Vale is a suburb of Bristol, England, on the south-western edge of the city. The area has a mixture of residential and light industry.

Ashton Vale was the home of British Cellophane in the 1980s. It is part of the Bedminster ward which elects two members of Bristol City Council. The local school is Ashton Vale Primary School.

The Portishead Railway runs along the eastern edge of the suburb and the Bristol to Taunton Line runs along the southern edge. The nearest station is Parson Street, which is near the proposed Ashton Gate station.

== Sport ==
From around 2007, Bristol City F.C. were planning to build a stadium in the area, to be called Bristol City Stadium and intended to replace their Ashton Gate stadium which is also in the south-west of the city. Planning approval was granted in October 2009 but there was opposition from residents, who in 2010 attempted to register the 45-acre former landfill site as a town green. In 2014, work began instead to enlarge the Ashton Gate stadium.

Ashton Vale is the home of Bristol Indoor Bowls Club.
