= Bower Ashton =

Coordinates: 51.44166°N 2.62988°W

- Location within Bristol
- OS grid reference: ST567719
- Unitary authority: Bristol
- Region: South West
- Country: England
- Sovereign state: United Kingdom
- Post town: BRISTOL
- Postcode district: BS3
- Dialling code: 0117
- Police: Avon and Somerset
- Fire: Avon
- Ambulance: South Western
- UK Parliament: Bristol South

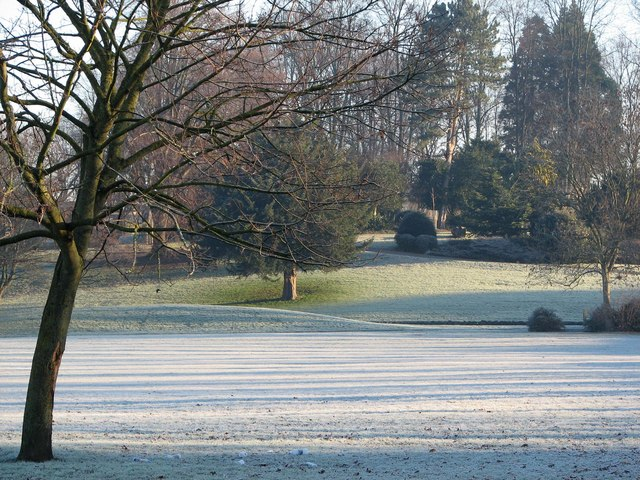
Greville Smyth Park

Bower Ashton is a neighbourhood in south west Bristol on the western boundary with North Somerset, lying within the Southville ward, approximately two miles from the city centre. Ashton Court estate, a 850-acre (3.4 km^{2}) recreational area owned by Bristol City Council lies just to the north, the Long Ashton by-pass (Brunel Way, the A370) to the south and the River Avon to the east.

The area is now mainly residential but also includes the Faculty of Arts, Creative Industries and Education (formerly the School of Creative Arts) of the University of the West of England, Ashton Park School, which is a specialist Sports College, as well as about 180 allotments in 5 different areas. Clifton Bridge and Ashton Gate railway stations are both now closed, but there is some pressure to reopen the latter as part of a rapid transit link from Portishead.

== History ==
Bower Ashton was historically a hamlet in the parish of Long Ashton in Somerset. In medieval times the area was owned by St Augustine's Abbey, but following the dissolution the Smyth estate was established by John Smyth, a merchant from Small Street in the city, in the 16th century. In the 19th century Sir John Henry Greville Smyth rebuilt Ashton Court Mansion along with a now demolished Dower house on the present site of the School of Creative Arts. Maps of that era show a ropewalk, Frayne's Colliery and Ashton Vale Iron works, adjacent to the Portishead railway line. An Iron Foundry was in operation in the area until the 1900s.

From ancient times the Rownham Ferry linked Bower Ashton with Hotwells. In medieval times it was owned by the monks of St Augustine's Abbey and brought them considerable income. There was also a ford downstream but due to the great tidal range this was dangerous. The ferry remained in operation until it closed in the 1930s, after the opening of the Ashton Swing Bridge at Ashton Gate. Legend has it that King Charles II crossed the Avon from Hotwells via the ferry on his way to Leigh Court in 1651.

In 1914, it was the location of the Bristol International Exhibition.

In 1951, the area was transferred from Long Ashton parish to Bristol.

== Attractions ==
Bower Ashton is also the location of the playing grounds of Bedminster Cricket Club (founded in 1847, for whom W.G. Grace played) and has a small part of the River Avon Trail (the old Tow Path) running along the River Avon in Greville Smyth Park, which was developed from land given to the city by Sir Greville Smyth. The park walk gives a classic view of the full span of Isambard Kingdom Brunel's Clifton Suspension Bridge across the Avon Gorge between Leigh Woods in North Somerset and Clifton in Bristol.

Across the River Avon are the lock gate entrances to Bristol Docks and the 'Floating Harbour' (completed in 1809) in Hotwells and the large Samuel Plimsoll Swing Bridge. Within easy walking distance too are: Ashton Court Estate, (where Bristol's famous outdoor festivals take place) and Ashton Gate stadium (home of Bristol City FC).
