= Ashton Gate railway station =

Disused railway station in Ashton Gate, Bristol

Coordinates: 51°26′30″N 2°37′32″W

Ashton Gate
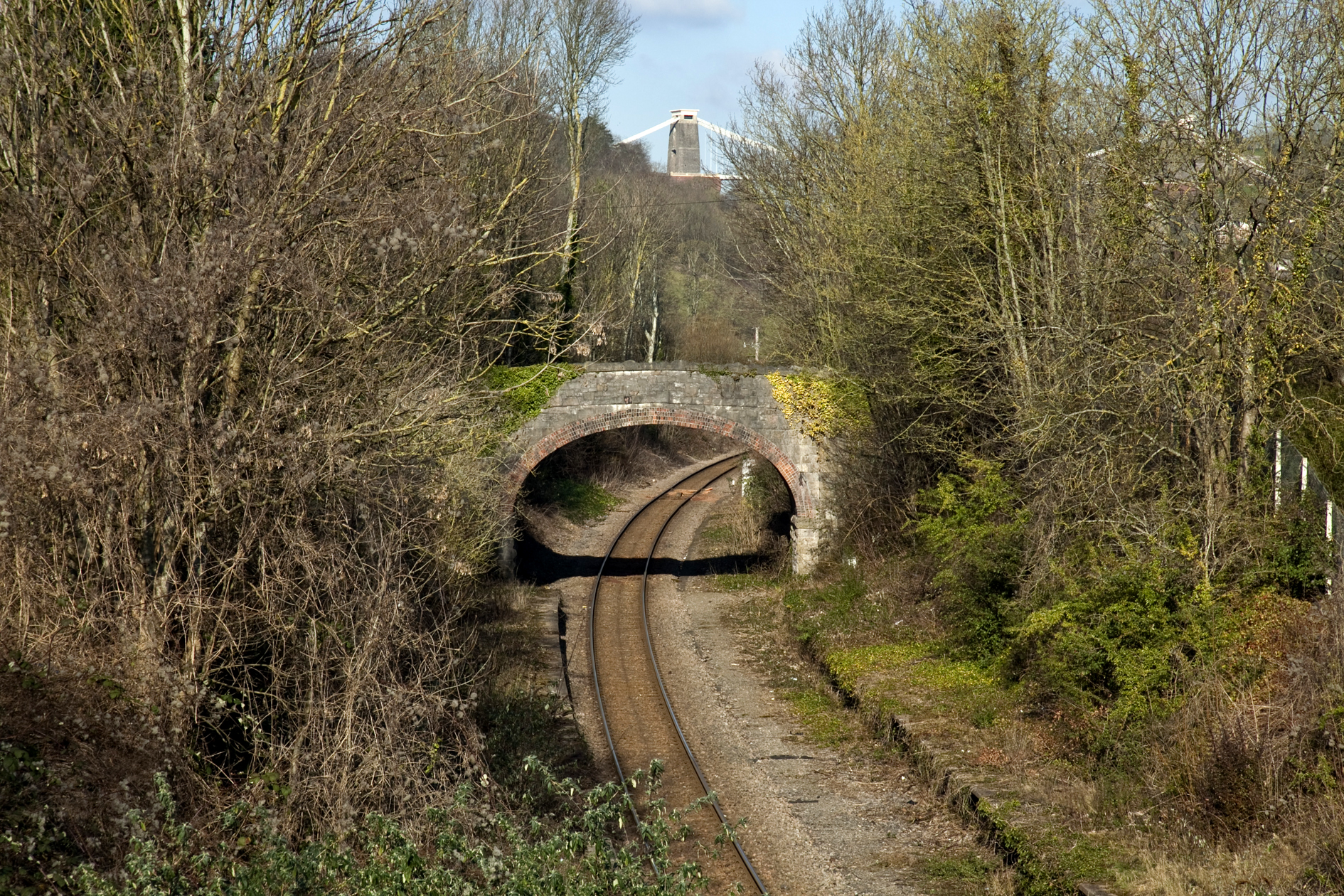
- The disused station pictured in 2012.

General information
- Location: Ashton Gate, City of Bristol; England
- Grid reference: ST566716
- Platforms: 2

Other information
- Status: Disused

History
- Original company: Great Western Railway
- Pre-grouping: Great Western Railway
- Post-grouping: Great Western Railway

Key dates
- 15 September 1906: Station partly opens as Ashton Gate Platform
- 1 October 1910: Station fully opens
- 1917: Station closed
- 23 May 1926: Station reopens
- August 1928: Station renamed Ashton Gate
- 29 October 1962: Station renamed Ashton Gate Halt
- 7 September 1964: Station closed
- 29 September 1970: Station reopens
- by 1984: Station closed
Location

Ashton Gate station, Bristol

Ashton Gate railway station was a railway station serving the Ashton Gate area of Bristol, England, which included Ashton Gate football ground, the home ground of Bristol City F.C. It was located on the Portishead Railway.

Recent proposals have been made for the station to reopen as part of the MetroWest project to improve rail transport in the Greater Bristol area.

The Portishead line was reopened for freight to the Royal Portbury Docks in 2001, but the station was not reopened.

== History ==
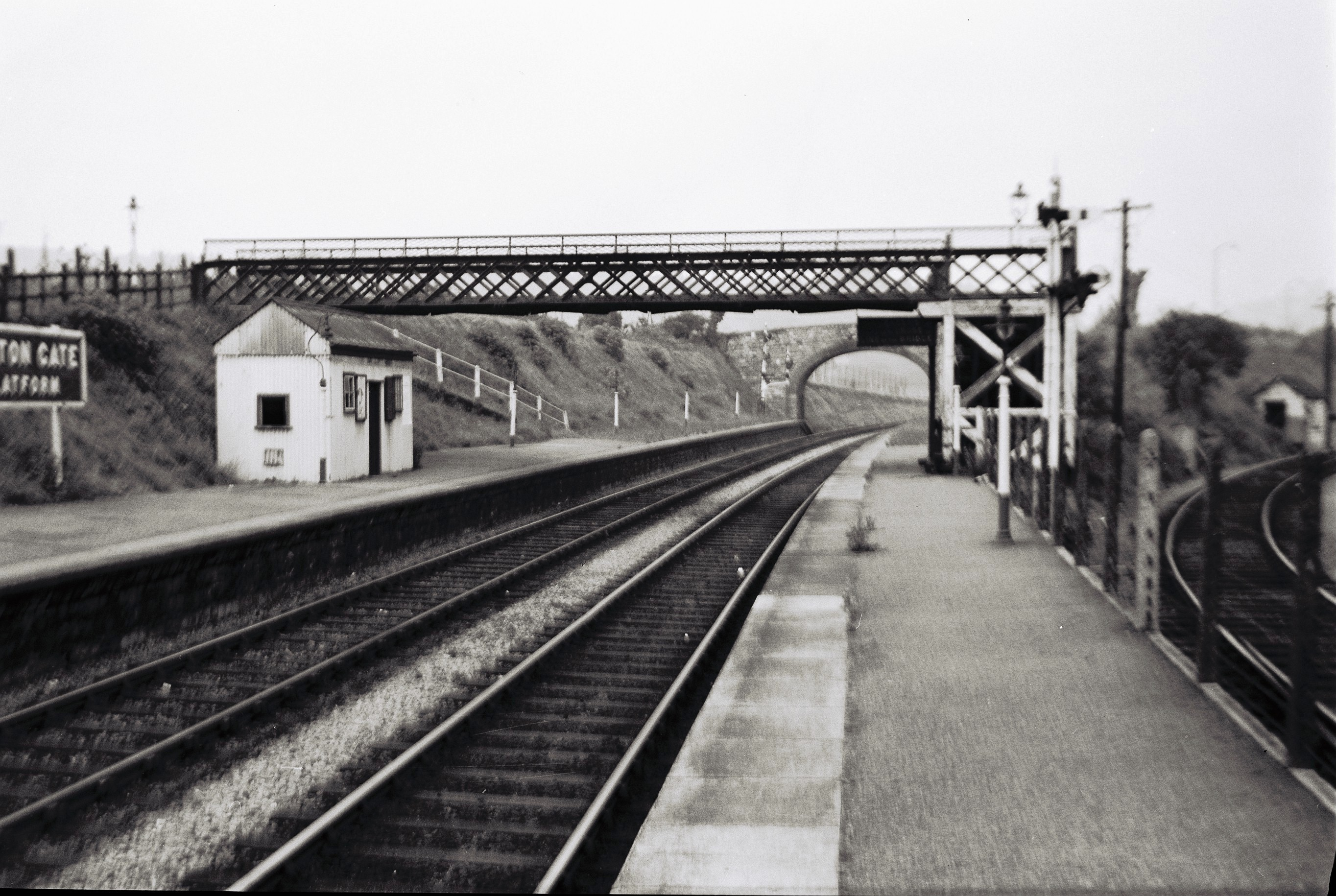
Station in 1962

The railway through Ashton Gate was opened on 18 April 1867 by the Bristol and Portishead Pier and Railway Company, when services began on their line from the Bristol and Exeter Railway at Portishead Junction (Note: The junction between the Bristol to Exeter line and Portishead Railway was known as Portishead Junction until 1932, after which it was known as Parson Street Junction.) to a pier on the Severn Estuary at Portishead. The line was built as 7 ft (2,134 mm) broad-gauge, and was largely single track. The line was relaid as 4 ft 8 1/2 in (1,435 mm) standard gauge between 24 and 27 January 1880, and in 1883 the line was double-tracked.

Ashton Gate station was built after local football team Bristol City were promoted to the Football League First Division, then the top tier of English football. The station was opened to serve their home ground, Ashton Gate Stadium, which was situated nearby. The station opened for supporters on 15 September 1906, and to the general public on 1 October that year. In 1914 it was temporarily renamed "Exhibition Station" for the Bristol International Exhibition.

The station was 8 miles 75 chains (14.4 km) from the line's terminus at Portishead, (Note: The location of the terminal pier is an estimate.) 2 miles 79 chains (4.8 km) from Bristol Temple Meads and 121 miles 30 chains (195.3 km) from the Great Western Railway's terminus at London Paddington. (Note: Railways in the United Kingdom are, for historical reasons, measured in miles and chains. There are 80 chains to the mile.)

The station closed due to economies during the First World War. It then passed on to the Western Region of British Railways on nationalisation in 1948. It was then closed by the British Railways Board in 1964, then briefly reopened for traffic to the football ground until 1977, and temporarily re-opened in May 1984 to serve Mission England, a series of evangelical rallies over four days by Billy Graham at the football ground.

| Preceding station | Historical railways | Following station |
|---|---|---|
| Parson Street | Great Western Railway; Portishead Railway | Clifton Bridge; Line open, Station closed |

== Future ==
The Portishead Branch Line is to be reopened as part of the MetroWest scheme, a rail transport plan which aims to enhance transport capacity in the Bristol area. The scheme was given the go-ahead in July 2012 as part of the City Deal, whereby local councils would be given greater control over money by the government. A consultation on the plans was held between 22 June and 3 August 2015 to gather views from the community and stakeholders before moving on to detailed designs. The detailed proposals will be subject to a second consultation before the plans are finalised. Due to the additional capital costs, the line will not be electrified, however the design will include passive provision for future electrification. The line through Ashton Gate would be increased to double track. Network Rail stated that it was not feasible to reopen Ashton Gate during the initial stage of the project, but that the scheme will be future-proofed to allow the construction of a station at a later date.

Trains along the reopened line will operate between Portishead and Bristol Temple Meads, with two trains per hour in each direction. Services would call at Pill and Parson Street, with aspirations to also call at Bedminster and Ashton Gate. Trains could also be extended on to the Severn Beach Line. The trains used will be diesel multiple units, likely three carriages long. The line will be operated as part of the Greater Western passenger franchise. Great Western Railway, a subsidiary of FirstGroup, currently operate the Greater Western franchise, however their contract expires in early 2019, before services to Portishead are due to start. In May 2016, it was reported that Bristol City Council did not consider there was a business case for the station's reopening due to its low predicted annual patronage of 67,000 excluding Bristol City matches.

In 2025, the Mayor of the West of England Dan Norris stated he was seeking to fund a new Ashton Gate station alongside the already funded reopening of the Bristol to Portishead line for passengers.
