= MetroWest (Bristol) =

Project to improve the rail services in Bristol

Overview
- Owner: Network Rail
- Locale: Greater Bristol
- Transit type: Commuter rail
- Number of lines: 3 + 2 under construction
- Number of stations: 26 currently, another 6-10 planned
- Website: travelwest.info/metrowest

Operation
- Began operation: 13 December 2021
- Operator: Great Western Railway

MetroWest, formerly known as the Greater Bristol Metro, is a project to improve the rail services in Bristol, England, and the surrounding region. It was first proposed at First Great Western's Stakeholder Event in March 2008. The aim of the project is to develop half-hourly services through central Bristol which will also serve the surrounding West of England region. Transport campaigning groups Friends of Suburban Bristol Railways (FoSBR) and Transport for Greater Bristol are actively supporting the proposal, as are the three unitary authorities under the West of England Combined Authority (WECA) and North Somerset Council.

MetroWest services began on 13 December 2021, with the doubling of the frequency of services from Bristol Temple Meads to Severn Beach.

== History ==
=== Early plans ===
Earlier plans for a metro system were promoted by then MEP Richard Cottrell in 1986, and acts of Parliament were secured. This would have used existing track, with new build through the city centre. However, the scheme folded in around 2004 when Advanced Transport for Avon was wound up with debts of £3.8 million.

=== Initial planning ===
Rail usage in the West of England doubled in the ten years between 1999 and 2009. A campaign for a Greater Bristol Metro was launched in February 2012, with plans prepared by engineering consultancy Halcrow Group. The scheme was estimated to cost £22 million at 2008/09 prices and could be completed between 2016 and 2021.

The 2012 plans included station reopening costs, estimated by Bristol City Council to be an average of £5 million each. Related estimates for reopening of the Portishead Railway and for four-tracking between Parson Street and Filton Bank were reported as approximately £50 million and £30 million respectively. It was subsequently reported that the Portishead Railway reopening would cost around £33 million.

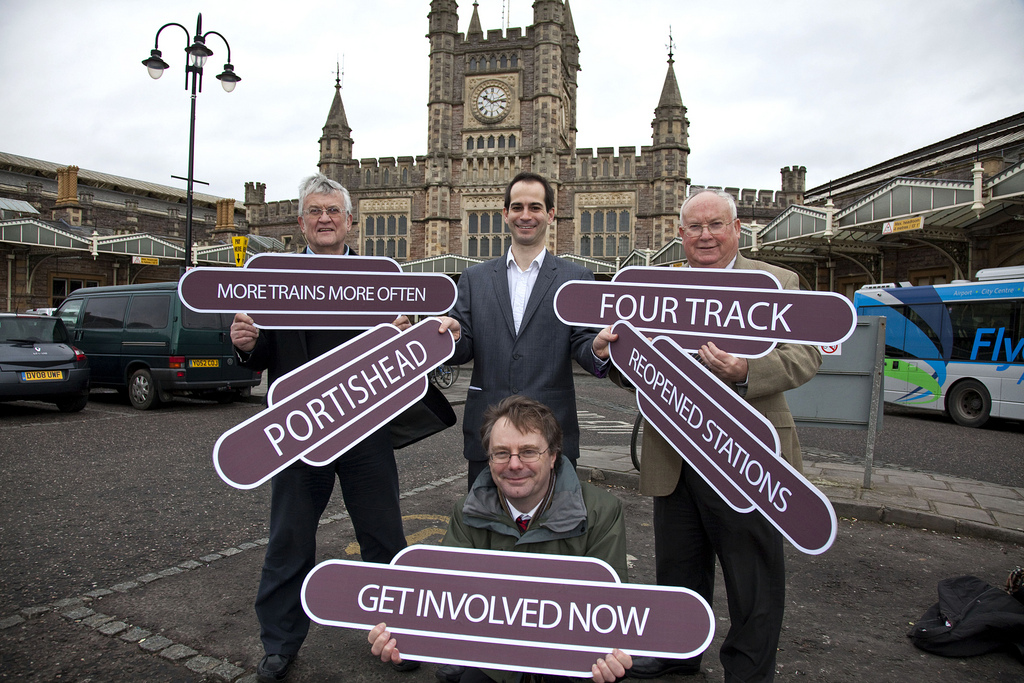
Local politicians at the launch of the Metro campaign in 2012

The scheme was given the go-ahead in July 2012 as part of the City Deal, whereby local councils would be given greater control over money by the government. Councillor Tim Kent stated in September 2012 that the first part of the scheme, on the Severn Beach Line, would be delivered "next year".

An opinion piece in the Bristol Evening Post in June 2011 called for the establishment of an Integrated Transport Authority for the West of England and for progress on the metro proposal. During the Rail Priority Conference organised by the West of England Partnership in November 2011, delegates travelled on the Portishead line, the Severn Beach line and the Henbury Loop, using sections of track not currently used for passenger traffic. In early 2012, during the consultation phase for the new Great Western rail franchise, Bristol City Council and local rail user groups launched Bristol Metro 2013 to ask bidders to incorporate metro plans into their bids. Bristol MPs were lobbied in Westminster by Dawn Primarolo (MP for Bristol South) and Steve Webb (former MP for Thornbury & Yate). The Saltford Station Campaign Group and Bath and North East Somerset Council suggested in April 2012 that the reopening of Saltford station could be part funded by means other than those included in the West of England Partnership's report.

By 2015, little progress had been made on the project, with the West of England Local Enterprise Partnership producing a Key Principles Report in November 2015 reiterating the aspiration to reopen lines and increased train frequencies as well as discussing future potential transport projects for the West of England region, including new rail transit based options referred to as MetroWest++. The options outlined include reopening the Thornbury Branch Line, a Yate to Bath route, the use of tram train technology, a link to the city centre and a connection to Bristol Airport. A 2015 report was produced by Arup, appointed by Bristol City Council, to analyse potential cost of electrifying both phases of MetroWest, with Arup concluding a total cost of £175 million.

=== Delays ===
In 2014, the expected opening date for the Portishead Line was Spring 2019. In March 2017, MetroWest reported a substantial increase in the estimated costs of Phase 1, owing to the work required to upgrade the line in the Avon Gorge to achieve the line speeds required for a half-hourly service, and to reroute road traffic away from a level crossing in Ashton Vale. The original £50 million cost estimate had increased to £145 million, which was reduced to £116 million by changing the planned frequency to hourly. In 2018 the local authority made a bid for funding from central government that was turned down, placing the project into uncertainty.

Funding of £31 million for the Portishead line was promised in April 2019 by Chris Grayling, the Secretary of State for Transport. After this the revised date for the opening of the Portishead line became 'by 2023'. In August 2019, North Somerset Council announced it would be submitting a request for a development consent order to the government by the end of September, with a proposed 2023 opening being reiterated. The COVID-19 pandemic then pushed back the opening of the Portishead Line by one year to December 2024.

Following further delays, Secretary of State for Transport Mark Harper gave final consent for the Portishead railway in November 2022, with an aspired opening date of 2026. Funding was finally fully agreed with the government in February 2025. Three miles of track will be laid, and stations will be built at Portishead and Pill, and potentially at Ashton Gate. The project, funded by central government, WECA and North Somerset Council, is expected to cost £182 million.

The Henbury line, with new stations Henbury and Bristol Brabazon, will open later.

== Project description ==
The MetroWest Project has two phases. MetroWest Phase One involves the reopening of the Portishead Line, and hourly services between Severn Beach and Bath Spa. Phase Two consists of reopening the Henbury Line, with half-hourly services between Weston-super-Mare and Yate.

=== New rail lines ===
The two major components of the MetroWest project are the reopening of the disused Portishead Railway, with stations at Pill and Portishead; and the reopening to passenger traffic of the Henbury Line with stations at Ashley Down, Bristol Brabazon and Henbury. The lines would have services to/from Bristol Temple Meads, and were each expected to carry 0.4 million passengers per year. In April 2016, it was reported that the North Somerset Council had agreed to buy two parcels of land for the creation of the Portishead and Pill stations at the cost of £880,000.

=== Upgrades and new stations on existing lines ===
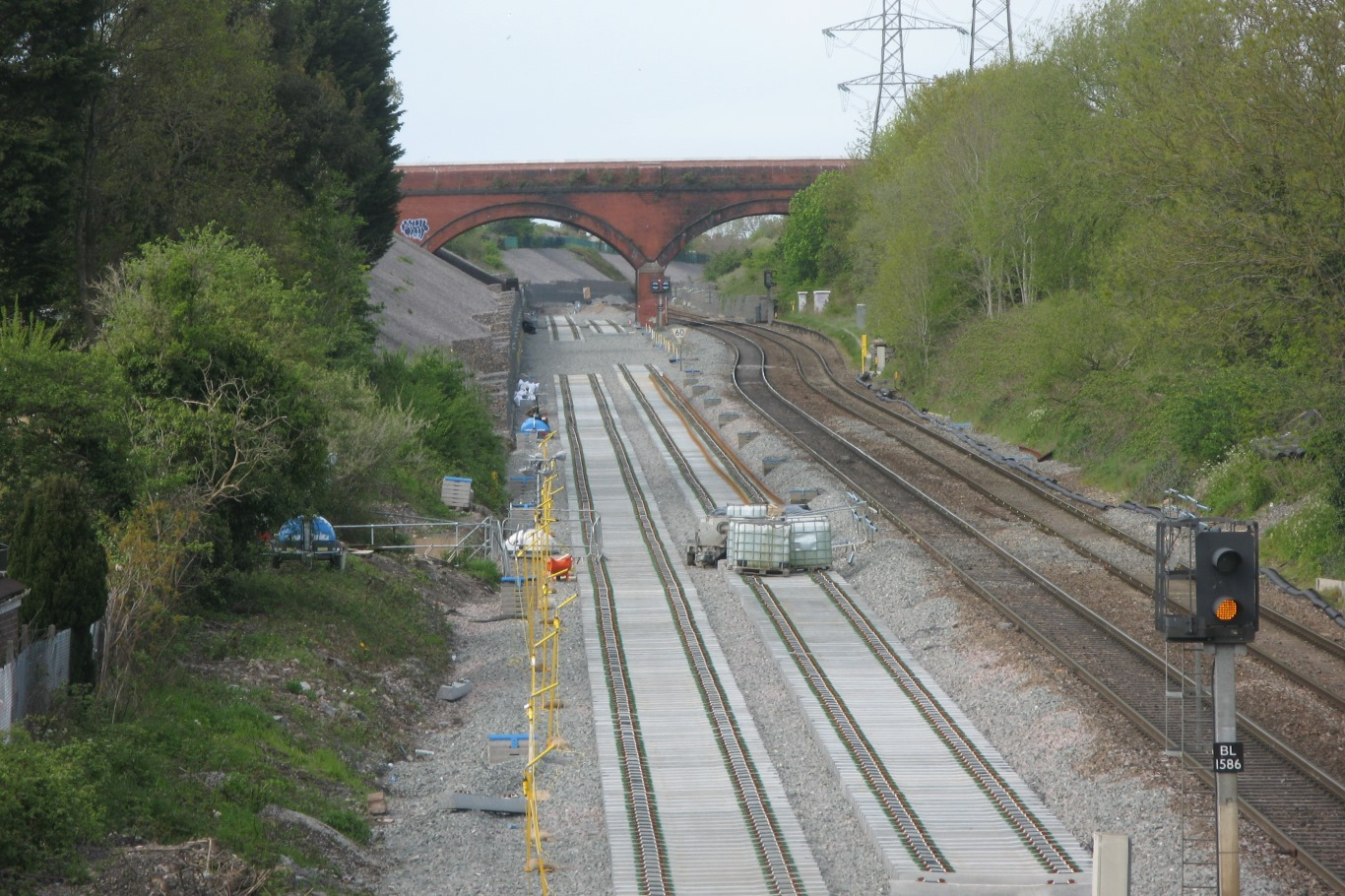
Work in 2018 to reinstate the two extra tracks at the site of Horfield railway station

Upgrades to existing lines include the four-tracking of Filton Bank, the line from Bristol Temple Meads to Bristol Parkway, in order to separate local journeys from express and long distance trains, similar to the S-train principle. This work was completed in 2018 and will allow two trains per hour between Bristol Temple Meads and Yate, and two trains per hour from the Severn Beach Line to Bath Spa, which are expected to generate 0.25 and 0.6 million passengers per year respectively.

In 2017, £2.23 million was allocated for construction of the Portway Park & Ride station on the Severn Beach Line, which had been under discussion since 2009. £1.67 million came from the government's New Stations Fund, with additional funding from WECA and the West of England Local Enterprise Partnership. Ground surveys began in 2017, with completion originally planned for 2019; however, planning permission was not granted until March 2019. Work began on the station in early 2022 and after some delays it opened on 1 August 2023.

In 2023, work began on building Ashley Down railway station on the site of the former Ashley Hill railway station. Services commenced on 28 September 2024.

Further potential station reopenings include St Anne's Park and Saltford.

== Future extensions ==
Extensions are proposed north from Yate to Gloucester and southeast from Bath to Westbury, with WECA in talks with Network Rail to determine the necessary infrastructure. In 2016, Wiltshire Council were studying the potential of a MetroWest extension to Chippenham which would see a reopened Corsham station between Chippenham and Bath Spa. Bath and North East Somerset also commissioned a study into the reopening of Bathampton station in 2015.

In 2020 WECA published its 10 year rail delivery plan, which included the potential reopening of Charfield railway station and "Temple Meads to Parson Street capacity building to allow more frequent services".

=== Airport rail link ===
A report produced by the West of England LEP into improving access to Bristol Airport from the city centre studied the potential of a heavy rail link to the airport, either branching from Parson Street following the A38 road, from Nailsea & Backwell, or from Yatton using the old trackbed of the Wrington Vale Light Railway. However, by 2017 it was confirmed the airport link was likely to form part of Bristol's proposed mass transit network.

=== Thornbury Branch Line ===
Suggestions were made to reopen the Thornbury Branch Line. However, in 2017 the West of England Combined Authority found there would be several challenges in delivering this proposal, as the former rail alignment into Thornbury is now occupied by an industrial estate and there is no practical routing into the town. The station would therefore have to be located on the edge of Thornbury at a significant distance from the town centre, making it less attractive to passengers. The Grovesend tunnel would also need to be reopened, with its current condition unknown, and there would be capacity constraints at Westerleigh Junction. This led to the Authority deciding not to pursue reopening the line. FOSBR continue to advocate reopening the line in the future.

In 2020, the line was mentioned by Railway Gazette International as having potential for future funding from the Department for Transport's "Restoring Your Railway" initiative.

== See also ==
- Greater Bristol
- MetroBus (Bristol)
- Transport in Bristol
- Urban rail in the United Kingdom
- Rail services in the West of England
