= Portbury railway station =

Former railway station in England

Portbury station
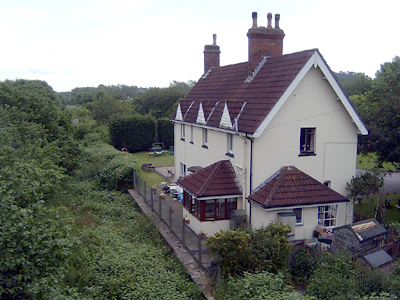
- The disused railway station at Portbury

General information
- Location: Portbury, North Somerset; England
- Coordinates: 51.4778°N 2.7261°W
- Grid reference: ST496757
- Platforms: 1

Other information
- Status: Disused

History
- Original company: Bristol and Portishead Pier and Railway
- Pre-grouping: Great Western Railway
- Post-grouping: Great Western Railway

Key dates
- 18 April 1867: Opened
- 30 April 1962: Closed
Location

Portbury railway station was a railway station serving the village and shipyard of Portbury in Somerset, near Bristol, England. It opened in 1867 and closed in 1962. The line through the station was closed in 1964 and the former station house is now a private dwelling.

A three-mile stretch of the former line between Portbury and Portishead was bought by North Somerset Council in 2008 in order to keep the option of re-opening the line alive.

Preceding station	Historical railways	Following station
Pill; Line open, Station closed	Great Western Railway; Portishead Railway	Portishead; Line closed, Station closed
