= Portishead railway station =

Former railway station in England

Portishead
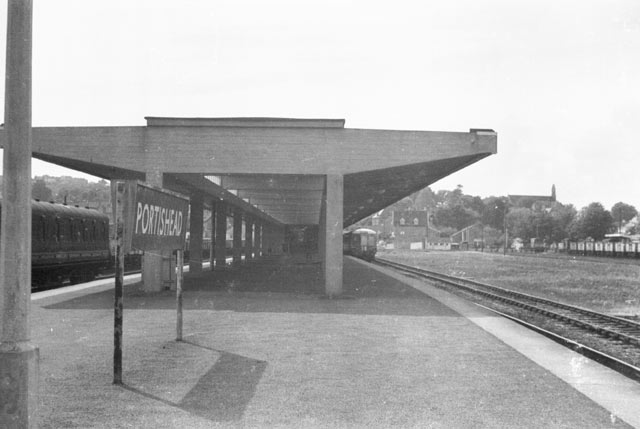
- The 1954 Portishead railway station, in 1960

General information
- Location: Portishead, North Somerset; England
- Coordinates: 51.4888°N 2.7633°W (Old station); 51.4855°N 2.7668°W (1954 station)
- Platforms: 1 (Old station); 2 (New station)

Other information
- Status: Disused

History
- Original company: Bristol and Portishead Pier and Railway
- Pre-grouping: Great Western Railway
- Post-grouping: Great Western Railway

Key dates
- 18 April 1867: Portishead (Old) station opened
- 4 January 1954: Closed, replaced by a new station 440 yards (400m) away
- 4 January 1954: Portishead (New or BTC) station opened
- 7 September 1964: Closed
Location

Portishead railway station was opened by the Bristol and Portishead Pier and Railway in 1867; it was approximately 0.5 miles (0.80 km) from the town of Portishead, North Somerset, England. After the opening of the Pier in 1870, the line was extended with an additional railway station opened by the pier. The Pier station closed first; and the original Portishead station closed in 1954, with a new Portishead station opened nearer the town. The 1954 station closed in 1964 when passenger services were withdrawn from the line.

A resited new station is due to be opened to passenger traffic as part of MetroWest, a scheme to increase rail services in the Bristol area. This will be built about 660 yards (600 m) east of the town centre. As of July 2025, the cost of the new station and railway line improvements is expected to be £182.21 million.

== History ==
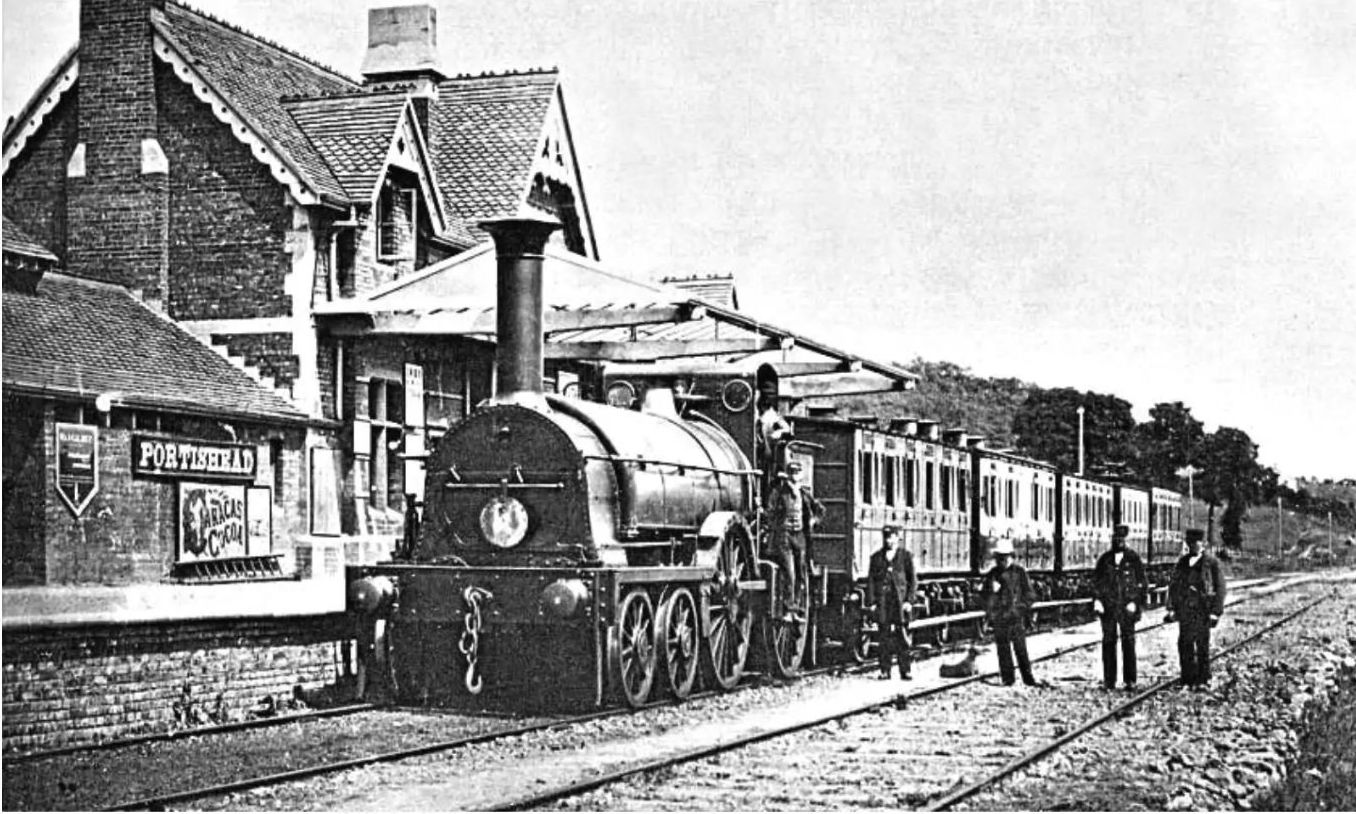
The original station in the 1870s

Portishead railway station was opened by the Bristol and Portishead Pier and Railway on 18 April 1867; it was approximately 0.5 miles (0.8 km) beyond the village of Portishead and handled both passengers and goods. The Pier was opened in 1870 and line was extended to the pier, with an additional railway station opened by the pier. By 1904, this was listed as a goods-only station, known as "Portishead Dock".

In the 1920s, the coal-fired Portishead power station was built adjacent to Portishead railway station; and the power station was extended in 1948 to increase its capacity. In 1949, building work also started on an additional power station, Portishead B power station. This led to the closure and demolition of the original Portishead railway station. It was replaced on the same day, 4 January 1954, by a new station 440 yards (400 m) nearer the centre of Portishead and Bristol to the designs of the Western Region Assistant Architect, Ian J. Campbell.

The 1954 station was closed by the "Beeching Axe" on 7 September 1964, when passenger services ceased on the line. Freight services continued on the line until the early 1980s.

Preceding station	Historical railways	Following station
Portbury; Line and station closed	Great Western Railway; Portishead Railway	Terminus
	Future services	
Pill	Greater Western franchise Portishead Branch Line	Terminus

== Future ==
A new station has been proposed, to be located 600 m (660 yd) east of the town centre. In April 2019 the Department for Transport committed £31.9 million to cover the shortfall in finance for MetroWest Phase 1, meaning that funding for the new station and reopened line has now been secured. In November 2019 North Somerset Council submitted a Development Consent Order (DCO) application to the Planning Inspectorate, which seeks powers to build and operate the disused section of railway from Portishead to Pill, gain environmental consent to undertake works to the existing freight railway through the Avon Gorge and obtain powers for the compulsory acquisition of land. In June 2023 the Portishead Railway Group (a local lobbying body) reported that "Work is under way on GRIP 5 and the Full Business Case, which will occupy all of 2023, with Government and local authority approval of the business case lasting into 2024".

In February 2025, it was announced that the final funds to complete the project had been secured, with work due to start in Summer 2025. In July 2025, the Transport Secretary Heidi Alexander confirmed that the government would provide financial backing if the project went over budget, which is expected to cost £182.21 million, including a central government contribution of £47 million. The money will pay for the new station and track, plus work to make the existing track between Pill and Bristol suitable for passenger trains. The new station is currently expected to open in 2028.
