= Royal Portbury Dock =

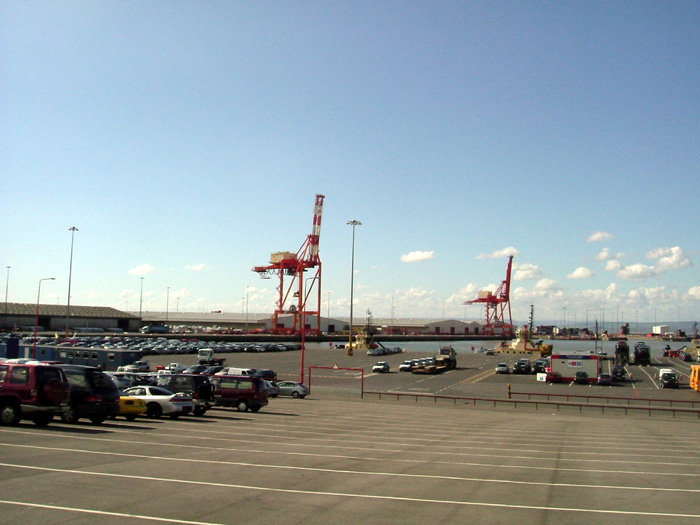
- Royal Portbury Dock, looking out to the Severn Estuary
- Interactive map of Royal Portbury Dock

Location
- Country: United Kingdom
- Location: North Somerset, England
- Coordinates: 51.493056°N 2.72°W

Details
- Opened: 1978
- Operated by: The Bristol Port Company
- Owned by: The Bristol Port Company
- Type of Harbor: Artificial
- No. of berths: 7
- No. of piers: 2
- Chairman: Terence Mordaunt

Statistics
- Annual cargo tonnage: 12m tonnes (2007)
- Annual revenue: £63m (2007)
- Website http://www.bristolport.co.uk/

The Royal Portbury Dock is part of the Port of Bristol, in England. It is situated near the village of Portbury on the southern side of the mouth of the Avon, where the river joins the Severn estuary — the Avonmouth Docks are on the opposite side of the Avon, within Avonmouth. The deepwater dock was constructed between 1972 and 1977, and is now a major port for the import of motor vehicles into the UK. The M5 motorway runs nearby, and the huge car storage compounds around the dock are visible from the Avonmouth Bridge. A waste industrial area west of the port is being developed as the Portbury Ashlands Nature Reserve.

The Royal Portbury Dock has the largest entrance lock into any UK port, accommodating vessels up to 41 m (135 ft) beam, 290 m (951 ft) length and 14.5 m (48 ft) draft.

== Operator ==
The dock is now operated by The Bristol Port Company, which also operates Avonmouth Docks, and has done since 1991 when it purchased a 150-year lease from Bristol City Council. Between 2000 and 2002 the Portishead Railway was repaired and extended to the dock at a cost of £21 million.

== Trades ==
Motor vehicles are both loaded and discharged, and stored on paved quay areas and storage compounds. In 2004, over 650,000 vehicles were handled. During 1996, the motor vehicle trade was awarded the International Quality Standard ISO 9002. Royal Portbury Dock can accommodate up to six RoRo vessels simultaneously. The port has storage space for 110,000 vehicles.

Aviation fuel tankers up to 120,000 dwt can discharge at the Bristol Aviation Fuel Terminal which opened in 2003, and feeds directly into the UK's pipeline and storage network.

Coal and other bulk cargoes can be discharged with two continuous ship unloaders and two gantry grab cranes, allowing for 5,000 tonne per hour throughput.

Since 2013 the wings for the Airbus A400M Atlas have left Portbury on three specialised ferries (one called the Ville de Bordeaux) after travelling from the factory at Filton. They go via St Nazaire to Seville. This is part of the Itinéraire à Grand Gabarit transportation system.

Containers and forestry products are also handled at the dock.

== Technical ==
The port experiences the second largest tidal range in the world. The Portbury Dock, like Avonmouth Dock across the river, is impounded and the water level within each dock is maintained by lock gates and impounding pumps. The pumps maintain a minimum water level in the dock when water is lost to the sea through ships entering/exiting the dock.

Royal Portbury Dock

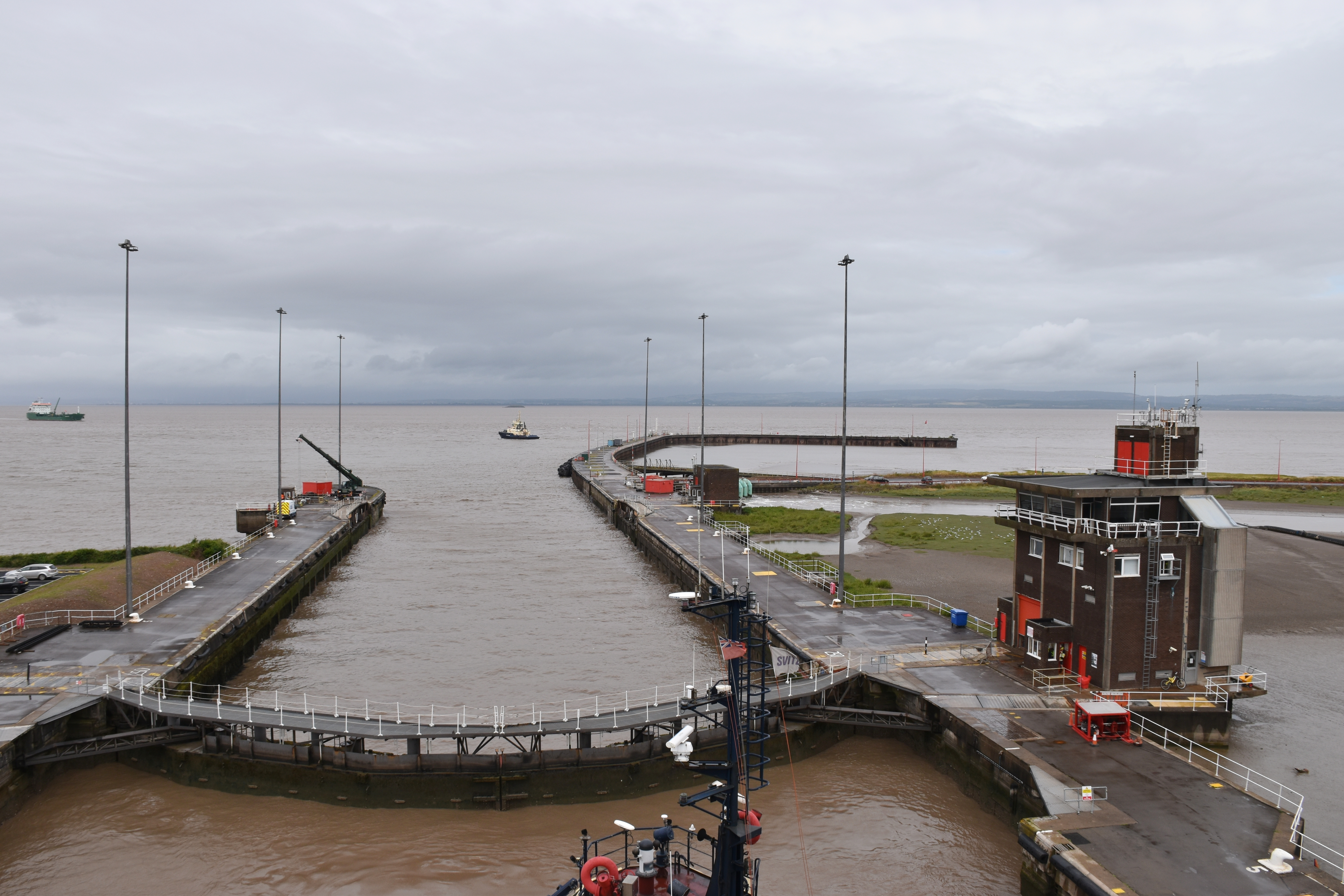
The lock entrance to Royal Portbury Dock

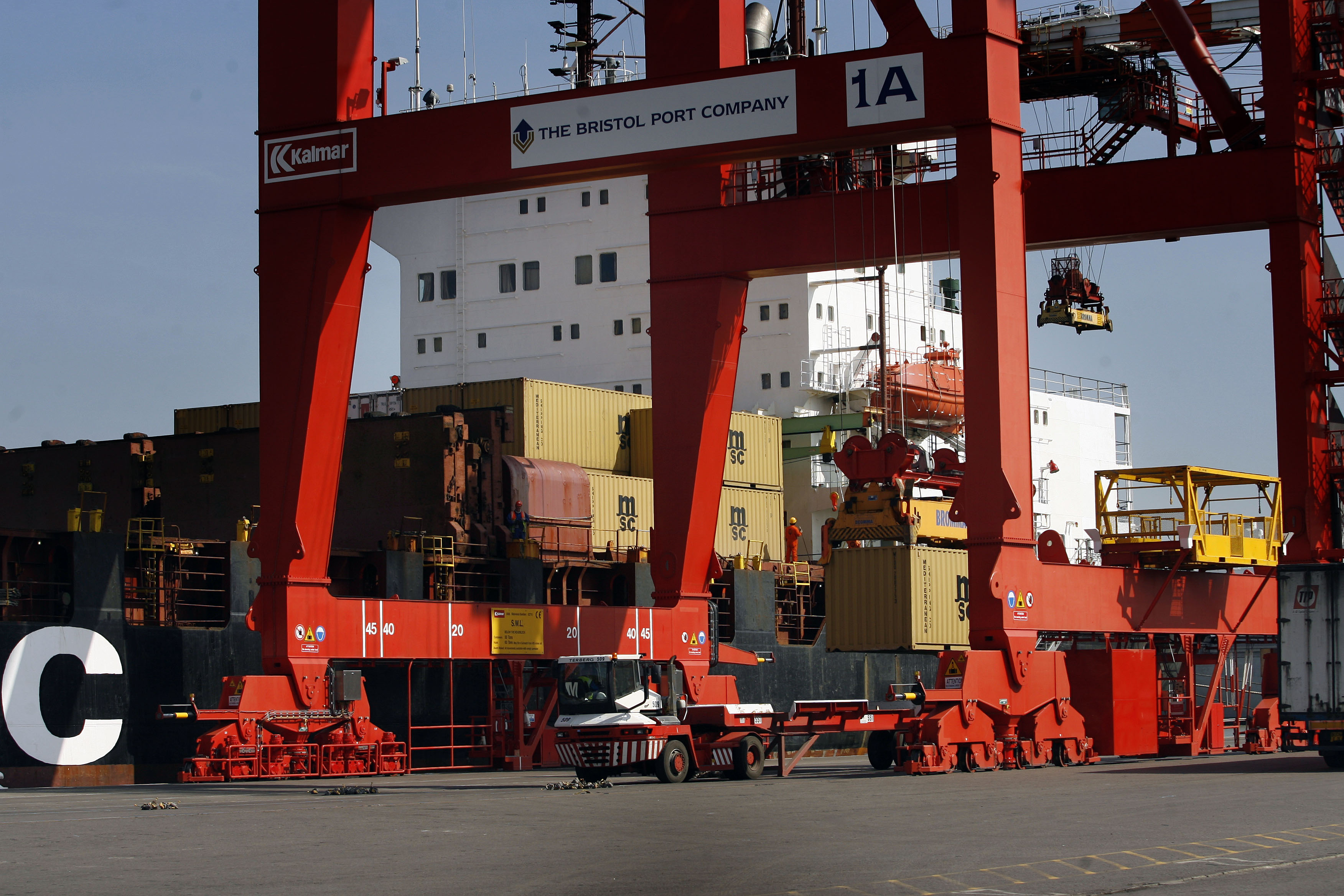
Cargo operations on the quay

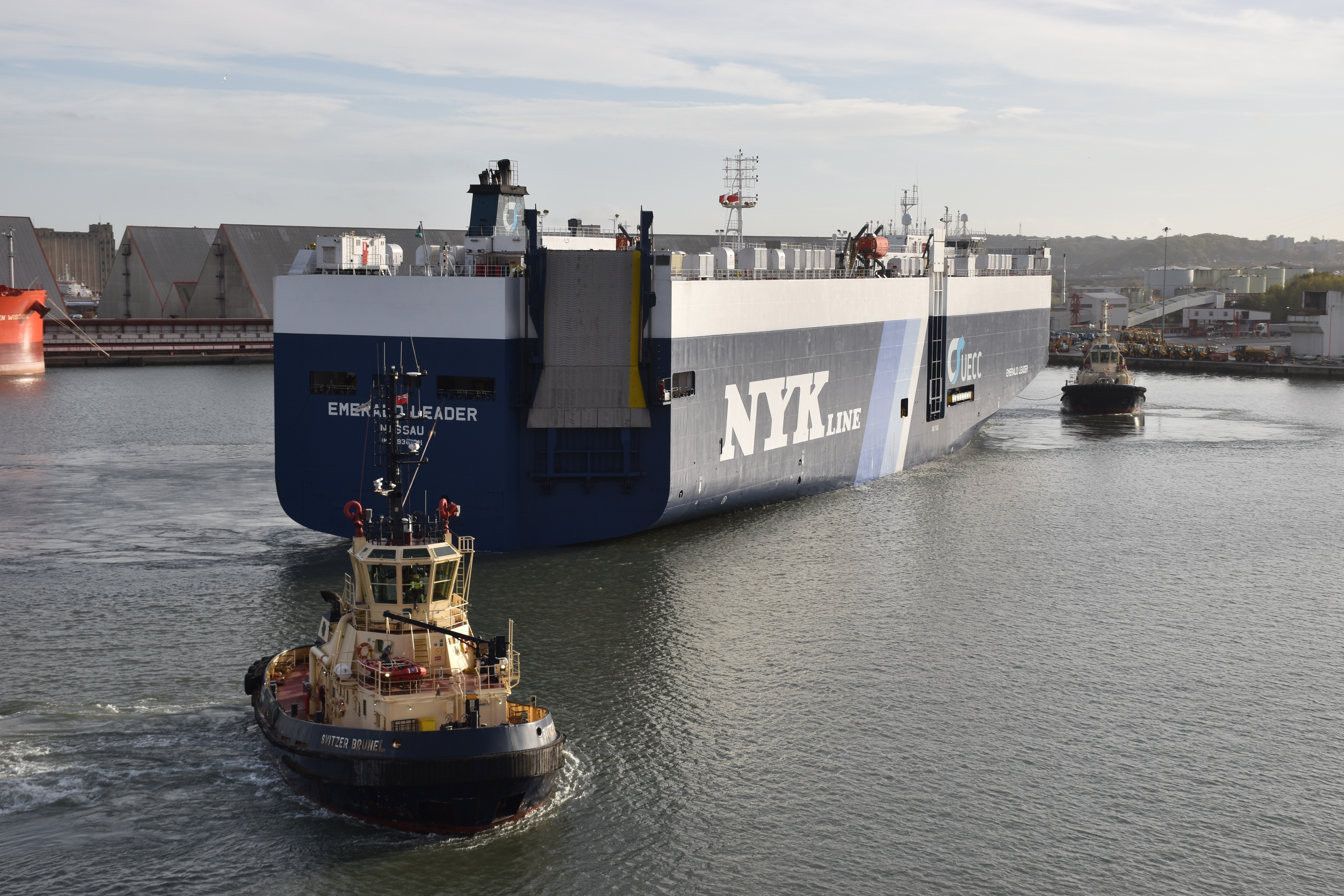
Arrival of a vehicle carrier

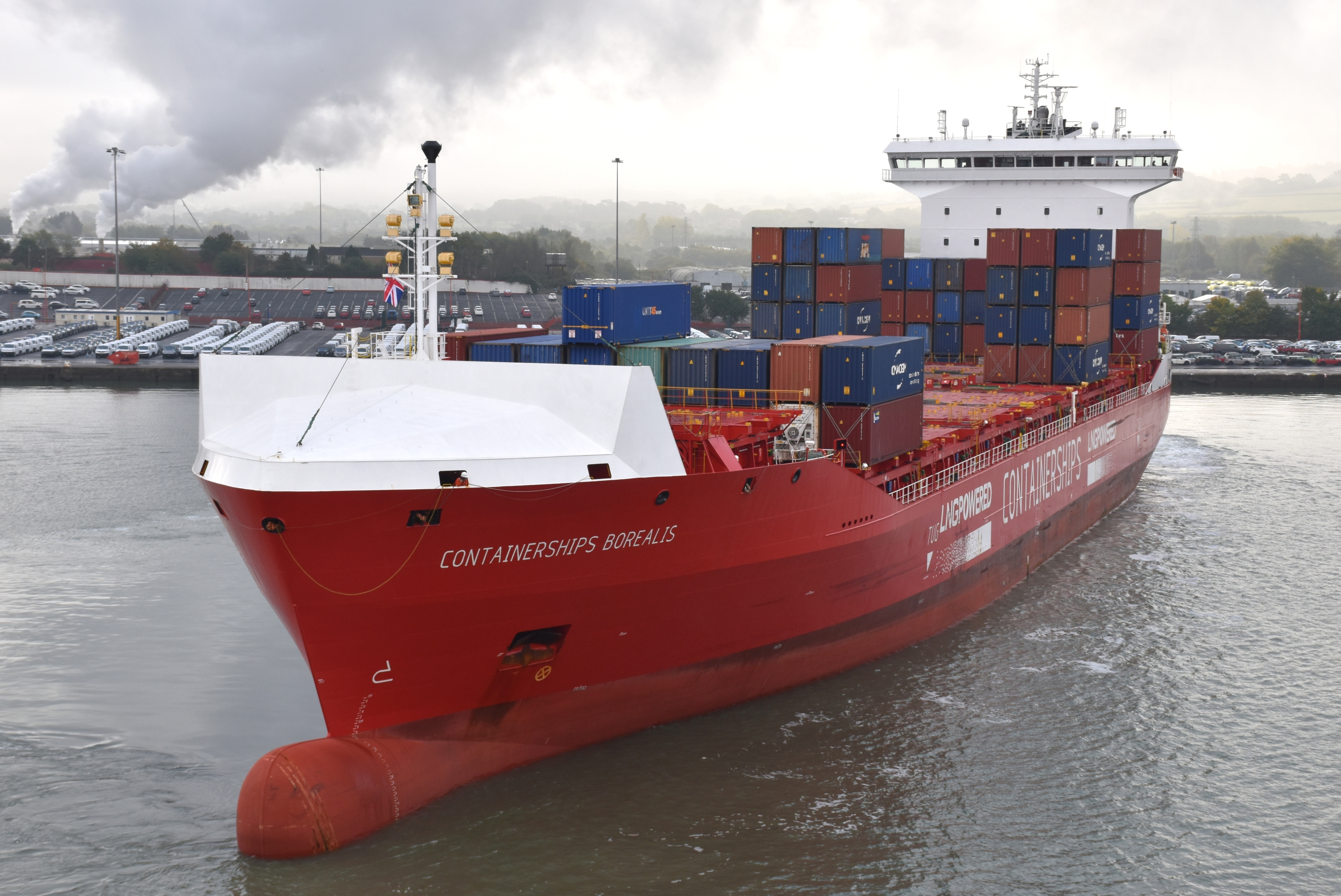
Container ship in the dock

== See also ==
- Port of Bristol
