= Portishead Railway =

Branch line in England

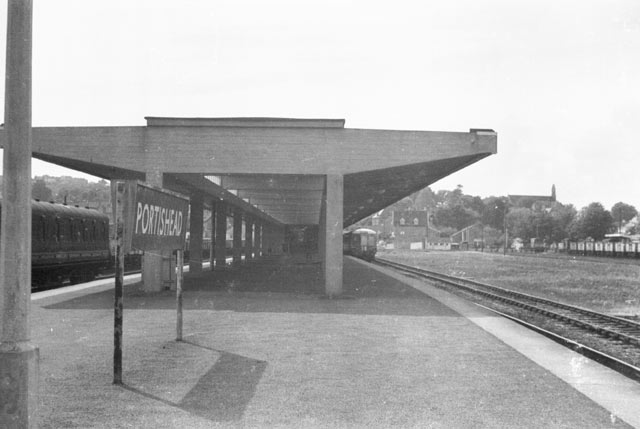
- The 1954 Portishead railway station, in 1960

Overview
- Owner: Network Rail

History
- Opened: 1867
- Closed: 1981
- Re-opened to Portbury: 2002

Technical
- Track gauge: 1,435 mm (4 ft 8 1/2 in)
- Old gauge: 7 ft 1/4 in (2,140 mm)
Route map
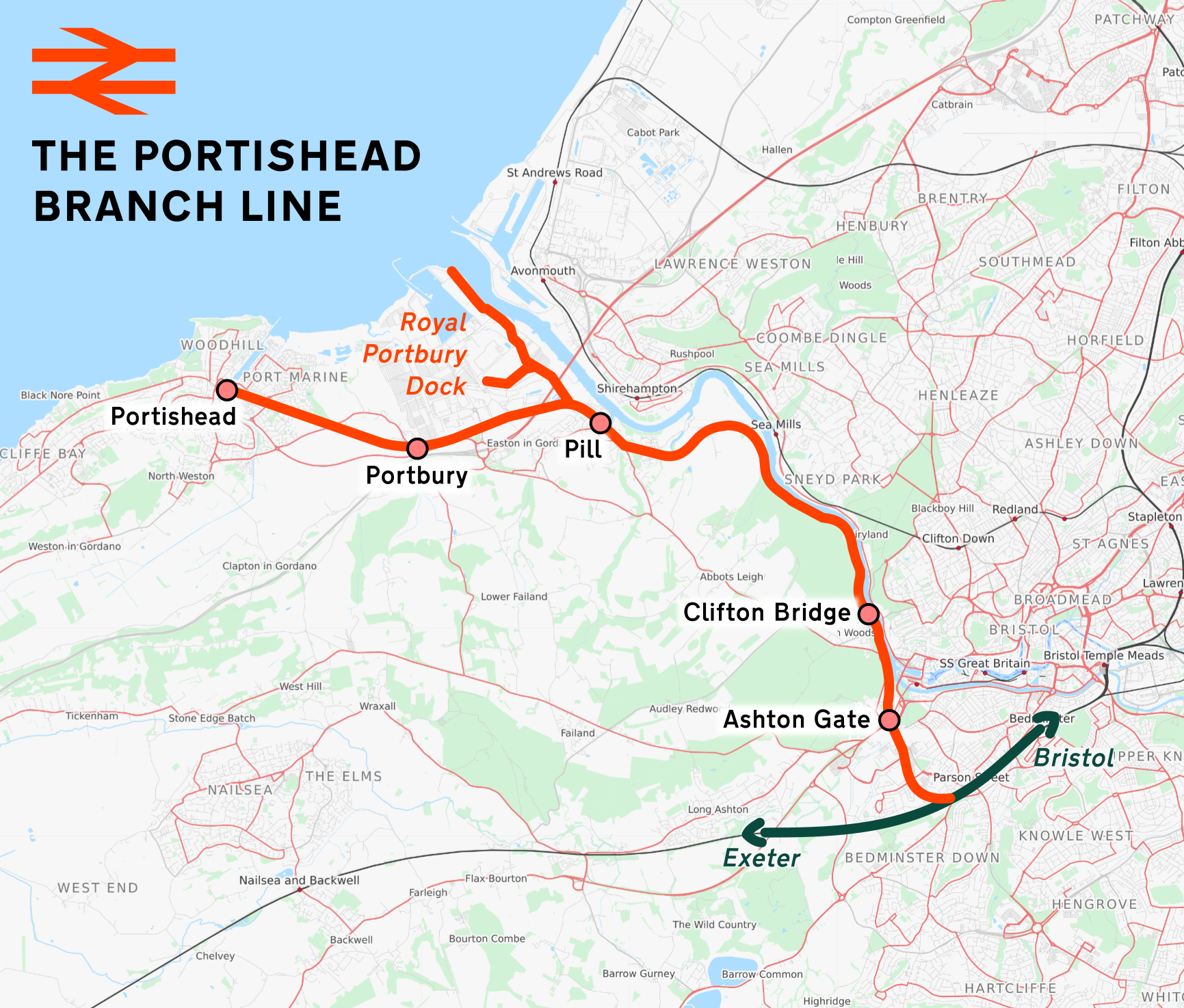
(Click to expand)

The Portishead Railway is a branch line railway running from Portishead in North Somerset to the main line immediately west of Bristol, England.It was constructed by the Bristol and Portishead Pier and Railway Company, but it was always operated by its main line neighbour, and was more usually thought of as the Portishead branch or the Portishead railway.

It opened as a broad gauge (7 ft 1/4 in [2,140 mm]) line to connect new docks at Portbury, at the west side of the mouth of the River Avon, with the railway network. The line opened to Portishead in 1867, and to the docks in 1879. The docks were always overshadowed by Bristol and Avonmouth docks. The ordinary passenger service declined in the twentieth century, leading to closure to passengers in 1964, and to all traffic in 1981.

When a new high capacity freight terminal was opened at the site of the Royal Portbury Dock, the line as far as that point was reopened to accommodate the new traffic, in 2002. Public consultation took place in 2015 regarding the reopening of the entire line to passenger traffic in 2020, as part of the MetroWest proposals. By 2020, the line was scheduled to reopen in December 2024. In February 2025, funding of £55 million was about to be agreed, with construction expected to start in mid-2025 and services in 2027.

== History ==
=== Getting authorisation ===
Portbury Pier and Railway Act 1846
- Act of Parliament
- Parliament of the United Kingdom
- Long title: An Act for constructing a Pier at Portsbury in the County of Somerset, and for making a Railway from the same to the City of Bristol, with a Branch Railway connected therewith.
- Citation: 9 & 10 Vict. c. cccxliv

Dates
- Royal assent: 3 August 1846

Text of statute as originally enacted

In the 17th and 18th centuries, Bristol harbour had been paramount as the focus of international trade with the New World. However the city centre location, and the difficult tidal negotiation of the Avon valley, was increasingly a constraint on development, particularly as larger vessels came into use. A number of schemes were put forward without success, but in 1846 the Portbury Pier and Railway Company obtained authority in the Portbury Pier and Railway Act 1846 (9 & 10 Vict. c. cccxliv) to build a floating pier near Portbury, on the west side of the Avon near its mouth, and a railway to connect it to Bristol. Isambard Kingdom Brunel had proposed the development, and the railway was to be operated on the atmospheric principle, in which trains were propelled by a piston in a tube between the rails, from which the air ahead of the train had been exhausted by stationary steam engines.

At this time the collapse of investor confidence following the period of railway mania was taking effect, therefore finance for the work could not be raised and the new company was dissolved.

In 1849 a small stone pier was built at Portishead, and packet steamers unloaded passengers there from that time; but this did little to reduce the desire to improve the city's port facilities, and competing factions tried to get approval for their schemes. In July 1862 the Bristol Port Railway and Pier Company obtained an act of Parliament, the Bristol Port, Railway and Pier Act 1862 (25 & 26 Vict. c. clix), giving authority for a railway on the eastern side of the Avon at "Clifton" (actually Hotwells), to a new dock at Avonmouth. This line opened in March 1865.

Bristol and Portishead Pier and Railway Act 1863
- Act of Parliament
- Parliament of the United Kingdom
- Long title: An Act to authorize the Construction of a Pier at Portbury in the County of Somerset, and of a Railway therefrom to the Bristol and Exeter Railway near Bristol, with a Branch Railway to Portishead; and for other Purposes.
- Citation: 26 & 27 Vict. c. cvii

Dates
- Royal assent: 29 June 1863

Text of statute as originally enacted

Those who favoured a port on the western side of the Avon were not deterred by the progress of the alternative, and formulated a scheme for a dock at Portbury, and a railway to serve it running from a junction with the Bristol and Exeter Railway (B&ER), with a branch to Portishead. The company would be the Bristol and Portishead Pier and Railway Company. The main line would have curved sharply to the north before reaching Portished, and run directly to a northwards pier on the coast somewhat east of the present Portbury Wharf location. The branch was to continue directly west from a junction near Sheepway Gate Farm to the Portishead station. This scheme easily got its authorising act of Parliament, the Bristol and Portishead Pier and Railway Act 1863 (26 & 27 Vict. c. cvii), on 29 June 1863, with a capital of £300,000 and borrowing powers of £66,600.

=== Construction, and a change of location ===
Work progressed swiftly, and a portion may (Note: Vincent appears to base this inference on a prediction at a September 1864 Board meeting, but does not confirm that it actually took place.) have been opened in early 1865 from Rownham near Clifton Bridge to the junction with the B&ER main line near the Telegraph Inn in Bedminster.

Bristol and Portishead Pier and Railway Act 1866
- Act of Parliament
- Parliament of the United Kingdom
- Long title: An Act to authorize the Bristol and Portishead Pier and Railway Company to alter the Pier at Portishead and to construct other Works, to extend the Time for the Purchase of Lands and Completion of Works, to amend the Act relating to the Company; and for other Purposes.
- Citation: 29 & 30 Vict. c. lxxxviii

Dates
- Royal assent: 11 June 1866

A number of changes were made to the intended route as work progressed, and the most significant was the change from a pier at Portbury to a dock at Portishead. The pier would have been exposed to westerly winds and would have had limited accommodation for the reception and loading of vessels. The intended Portishead branch became the main line, curving north at Portishead to service the west side of the new dock, and the Portbury section of the originally intended main line was abandoned; these changes were authorised in the Bristol and Portishead Pier and Railway Act 1866 (29 & 30 Vict. c. lxxxviii). Evidently the dock required more expenditure than the pier, and an additional £66,000 of share capital and £20,000 in loans were authorised.

The access to the new dock required a crossing of Portishead Pill on a curve, and a wooden trestle viaduct of 23 spans was required.

Colonel Yolland of the Board of Trade carried out an inspection of the line on 12 April 1867. He noted that the gradients and curves were significantly inferior to those on the original 1863 design; this probably indicates that they were sacrificed to reduce earthworks and avoid one of the tunnels. The line was 9 miles 11 1/2 chains (14.72 km) in length, with an additional 48 1/2 chains (980 m) at the dock. The track was broad gauge, and there were stations at Clifton Bridge, Pill, Portbury and Portishead, and a siding at Ashton Vale Works; there was an engine turntable at Portishead. However Yolland found numerous shortcomings; as well as fencing deficiencies there were inadequate clearances to two bridge abutments and to retaining walls, and in the No. 2 Tunnel; and proper signalling needed to be provided at the junction with the B&ER and at the Ashton Vale siding.

These and other shortcomings were attended to at once, and the line opened on 18 April 1867. The train service in 1870 was eight trains each way daily, with a journey time of 30 to 35 minutes; there was one train each way on Sundays, the return to Bristol leaving at 8:30 pm.

MacDermot describes the original opening: On 18 April 1867 the 9 1/2-mile (15.3 km) single line opened, constructed on the broad gauge (7 ft 1/4 in [2,140 mm]). There were four tunnels, respectively 59, 232, 88 and 665 yards (54, 212, 80 and 608 m) in length. The stations on the line were Clifton Bridge, Pill, Portbury and Portishead.

=== Subsequent history ===
The emphasis now was on passenger and ordinary goods traffic, and the original objective, the shipping facility, was on the back burner; reporting the opening, the Bristol Times said, "It is intended shortly to commence a port, which is expected to occupy about two years in the erection."

However, in June 1868 a tidal pier was opened, and by April 1870 a low-water extension was ready. Vincent says that the railway company itself ran steamer services to Cardiff and Newport, and summer excursions to Ilfracombe.

The Great Western Railway progressively converted its main lines and branches to standard gauge, 4 ft 8 1/2 in (1,435 mm), and the Portishead line, still the property of the Bristol and Portishead Pier and Railway Company, was converted between Saturday 24 and Tuesday 27 January 1880.

By the Bristol Dock Act 1897 (60 & 61 Vict. c. ciii), the GWR was authorised to make a connection between the branch and the Bristol Harbour Railway, also with the north side of the Floating Harbour following agreement with the Corporation of Bristol. These lines were completed to Canons Marsh and, via the water-hydraulic powered Ashton Swing Bridge to Wapping Wharf, opening to goods traffic on 4 October 1906, together with the West Loop at Ashton Gate, facing Exeter.

=== Closure ===
Passenger services were discontinued in 1964 as part of the Reshaping of British Railways report. Freight was discontinued in 1981 but the railway was not dismantled. In 1985 a series of steam excursions ran along the line as part of the "GW150" celebrations. This is thought to be the last commercial use before the line was rebuilt.

== Reopening of the line ==
=== Reopening for freight to Royal Portbury Docks ===
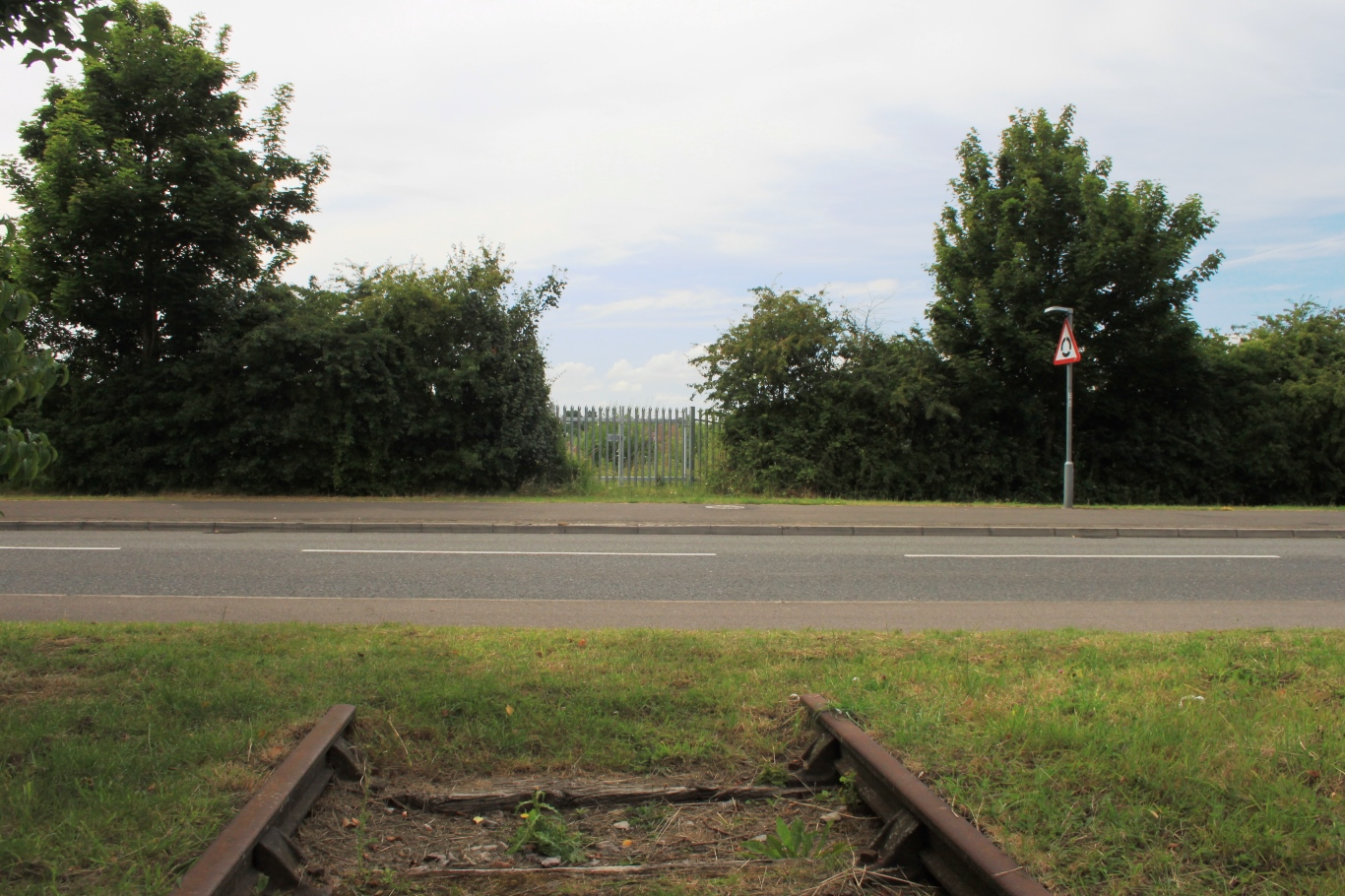
The railway station at Portishead will be built where the old route has been severed by this new road

During 2000 and 2001 the railway was rebuilt as far as Pill, and a short spur constructed to the Royal Portbury Dock to carry freight. The total cost of this work was £21 million. The guests for the official opening ceremony were taken from Parson Street station to Portbury on a train hauled by Bristol Industrial Museum's Portbury locomotive on 21 December.

=== Proposed extension to Portishead ===
The railway alignment has been safeguarded by local planning policies, and when the site of Portishead station was redeveloped as a Waitrose supermarket, a nearby site was safeguarded for a potential new station. The alignment is breached on the southern approach to Portishead by Quays Avenue, constructed to serve housing development around the former dockside.

Some local politicians and organisations campaigned to have the remaining 3.3 miles (5.3 km) repaired and a new station constructed at Portishead. A campaign group advocated reopening the station and the short stretch of unopened line. The coastal town largely serves as a dormitory town for Bristol workers, and the main route into the city – the single carriageway A369 – carries much commuter traffic.

The 2006–2011 Joint Local Transport Plan reserved £1 million for the project. In January 2009, it was announced that Network Rail was to carry out a feasibility study on re-opening the line. During the Rail Priority Conference organised by the West of England Partnership in November 2011, delegates travelled on the line, using sections of track not open for passenger traffic.

=== Metrowest programme ===
The project to reopen the Portishead line to passenger rail services is part of the MetroWest programme to improve local rail services in the West of England combined authority area (which covers most of greater Bristol, but excludes Portishead). This will use both existing and disused rail lines in the Bristol area, operating half-hourly services subject to a proven business case being made and infrastructure constraints. Phase 1 of the programme will include reopening the Portishead line to passenger services and increasing the frequency of services on the routes to Severn Beach and Bath. The project is being led by North Somerset Council on behalf of the three West of England combined authority councils (Bath & North East Somerset, South Gloucestershire, and Bristol City), with oversight from 2014 by the West of England Joint Transport Board within the West of England local enterprise partnership.

In March 2013, track clearance works began to allow surveying of the original route to Portishead. This was the beginning of the work required to reopen the line for passenger use. Technical assessment of potential sites for a new Portishead station was undertaken in 2013 and followed by public consultation in 2014. The site chosen in 2015 is at the junction of Harbour Road and Quays Avenue, some 600 metres short of the 1950s station.

In March 2017, MetroWest reported a substantial increase in the estimated costs of Phase 1, owing to the work required to upgrade the line in the Avon Gorge to achieve the line speeds required for a half-hourly service, and to reroute road traffic away from a level crossing in Ashton Vale. In order to reduce the cost from an estimated £145 million to £116M, the Joint Transport Board agreed to downsize the project to provide an hourly service to Portishead. A January 2019 report by the Campaign for Better Transport listed the line as a "priority 1" candidate for reopening.

In April 2019, £31 million of funding was promised by Chris Grayling, Secretary of State for Transport. The Department for Transport's Rail Network Enhancements Pipeline, published in October 2019, listed the project among those in development, awaiting a "Decision to Deliver" and the completion of a full business case.

In November 2019, North Somerset Council submitted a Development Consent Order (DCO) application to the Planning Inspectorate, which sought powers to build and operate the disused section of railway from Portishead to Pill, gain environmental consent to undertake works to the existing freight railway through the Avon Gorge, and obtain powers for the compulsory acquisition of land. The Secretary of State for Transport was expected to make a decision within 18 months, but the decision deadline was extended to April 2022. Subject to final business case approval, construction work had been expected to start in April/May 2022 and take around two years to complete.

In November 2022, the Department for Transport gave planning permission for the line to be reopened. In February 2023, VolkerFitzpatrick was appointed as primary contractor for the rebuilding of stations at Portishead and Pill.

It was reported in November 2022 that construction work to reopen the line to Portishead for passengers would not start until 2024, and the earliest opening date would not be before 2026. In December 2023, it was announced that a business case would be submitted the following year and construction could start before the end of 2024 with an anticipated opening date of 2028.

Dan Norris, mayor of the West of England Combined Authority, said in February 2025 that funding for the project had been agreed. In July 2025, the government pledged an additional £27.6 million towards the £182M scheme. Construction was expected to begin in the summer of 2025, leading to the first services running in 2027.

== Route ==
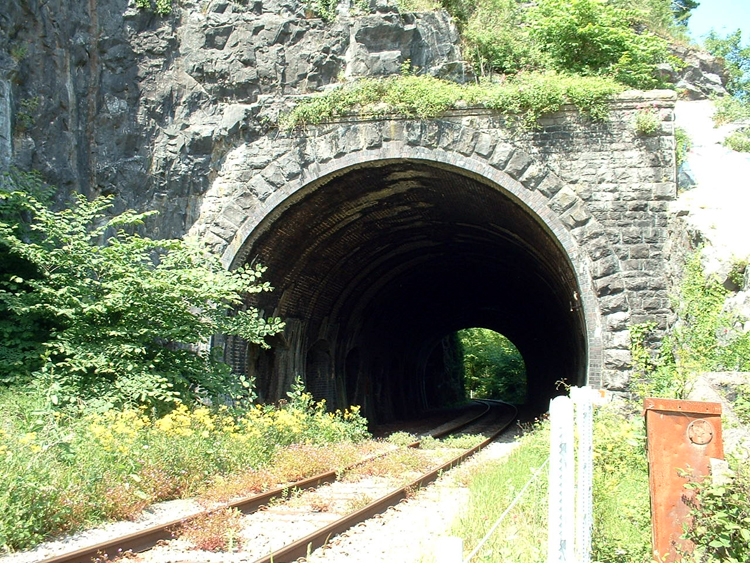
Tunnel in the Avon Gorge

The line branches northwards from the Bristol–Exeter main line at Parson Street Junction, originally called Portishead Junction, immediately west of Parson Street station in southern Bristol. From here it runs north along the southwest bank of the River Avon. At Ashton junction, the former line to Bristol Harbour diverged to the right. Immediately north of the site of the junction, the first station was Ashton Gate, opened in 1906, (Note: Cobb says 1926) followed by Clifton Bridge station, 1/2 mile (0.8 km) south of the Clifton Suspension Bridge itself.

Now in the Avon Gorge, the railway runs through No. 1 Tunnel where the Clifton Suspension Bridge runs overhead. Next is Nightingale Valley Halt, opened in 1928 and closed in 1932, where a footpath leads up to the Leigh Woods suburb of Bristol; the site of the halt is then followed by No. 2 Tunnel. There were several small quarries adjacent to the line as far as Sandstone Tunnel. There was then a crossing loop at Oakwood, approximately opposite Sea Mills.

The line then swings away westwards to Ham Green Halt, opened in 1926 to serve a hospital. The longer Pill tunnel was next, followed by Pill viaduct and passenger station, and then Portbury Shipyard station; the latter was built in 1918 to serve a planned shipyard, but this was never built and the station closed in 1928. Portbury is the next station, followed by the terminus of the passenger railway, Portishead, as the line swerves north-eastwards. The line originally continued beyond the passenger station in that direction to the Pier. This extension closed in 1954.

A west curve was constructed at the main line junction west of Parson Street, forming a triangle there.

The derelict shell of the Portbury Shipyard building (built 1913) remains to the north of the line. A short line branched off back towards the river at this point to serve the proposed development. In 1954 the original Portishead station was demolished, to provide space for the second Portishead power station, and a new station constructed in a new location, lasting only a decade before the line stopped carrying passengers.

The original line towards Portishead is severed just north of Pill, where the line to the Royal Portbury Dock leads off to the north, crossing the adjoining cycle path on a low concrete bridge. No points have been installed to create a junction with the former line onwards to Portishead, although the derelict track remains in situ from here towards Portishead, passing under the M5 motorway via a bridge that was constructed with sufficient clearance to allow for electrification.

== Operations ==
The freight-only route carries DB Schenker, Freightliner and GB Railfreight services. The major freight flows along the line are bulk coal and newly delivered vehicles. All services are operated by Class 66 or Class 70 locomotives.

== See also ==
- Weston, Clevedon and Portishead Light Railway, a 13.8-mile (22.2 km) standard gauge light railway which operated between Weston-super-Mare and Portishead
