= Long Ashton railway station =

Railway station in England

Coordinates: 51.42716°N 2.64961°W

Long Ashton
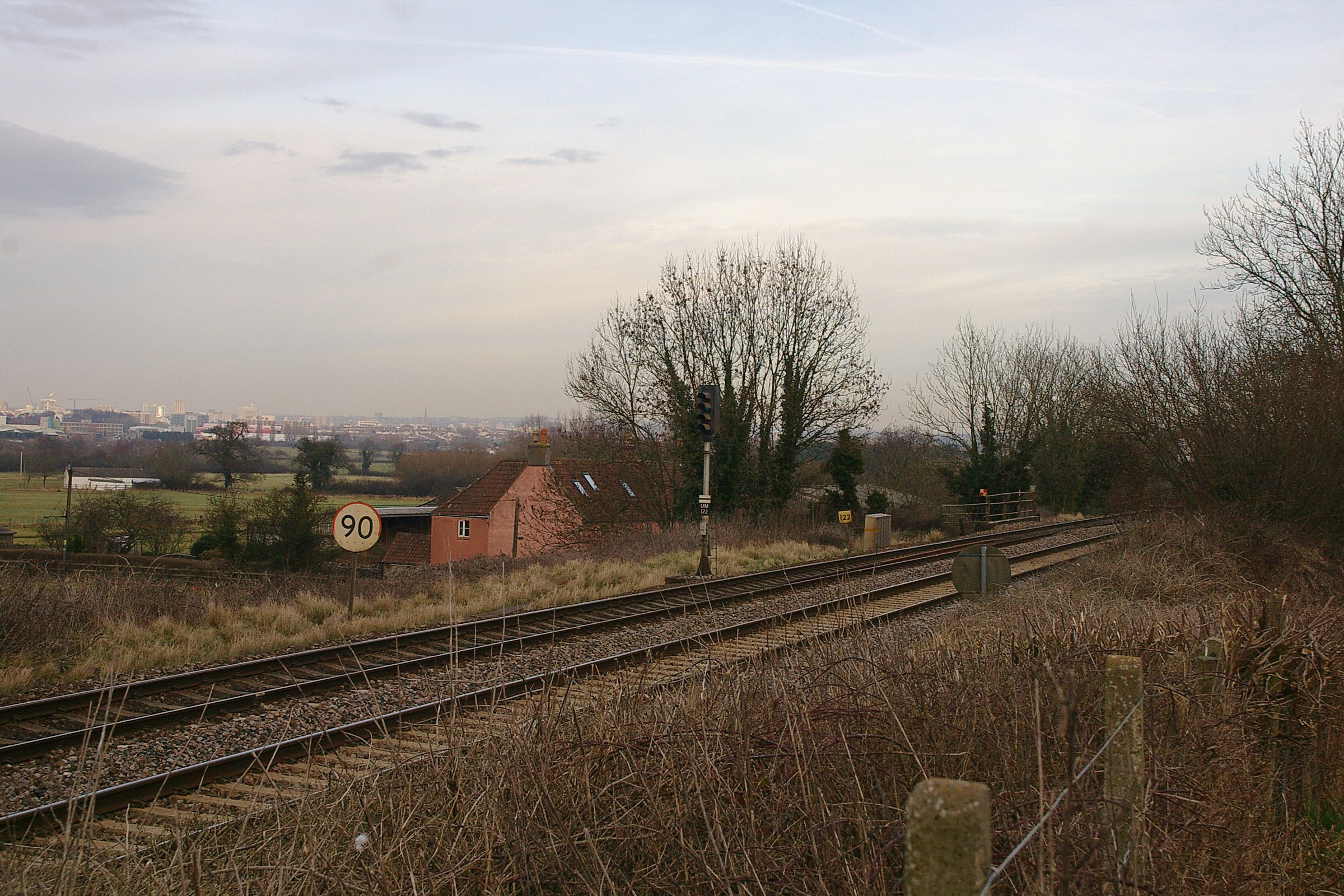
- The site of Long Ashton railway station.

General information
- Location: Long Ashton, North Somerset; England
- Platforms: 2

Other information
- Status: Disused

History
- Original company: Bristol and Exeter Railway
- Pre-grouping: Great Western Railway

Key dates
- 14 June 1841 or June 1852: Opened as Ashton
- January 1856: Closed
- 12 July 1926: Reopened as Long Ashton Platform
- 6 October 1941: Closed
Location

Long Ashton railway station was a railway station on the Bristol to Exeter line, 3.5 miles (5.6 km) southwest of Bristol Temple Meads, serving the village of Long Ashton in North Somerset, England. There were two stations on the site, the first, called "Ashton", opened in 1852 and closed in 1856. The second station, originally known as "Long Ashton Platform" before being renamed as "Long Ashton" in 1929, was operational from 1926 to 1941. The site is now partly under the A370 Long Ashton Bypass, and there are no visible remains of the station. There is local support for the station to be reopened, possibly sited further to the west, and possibly as part of the University of Bristol's proposed Fenswood Farm development.

== First station ==
The Bristol and Exeter Railway was opened between Bristol Temple Meads and Bridgwater on 14 June 1841, engineered by Isambard Kingdom Brunel and build originally as 7 ft (2,134 mm) broad-gauge. A station named "Ashton" opened in June 1852 near the village of Long Ashton. (Note: The is some confusion about when the first station opened as Butt's Directory of Railway Stations states that the station opened with the line in June 1841 but it does not appear in timetables published in 1841 (for example, see Brunel's Bristol Temple Meads, Binding, John (2001) p.139) nor is it mentioned in McDermott's History of the Great Western Railway although all the other stations opened with the line in 1841 are listed. Oakley's Somerset Railway Stations contains no reference to Ashton at all. Butt also claims that Bedminster railway station opened in 1871 with the name 'Ashton', but again timetables show it as Bedminster in 1877.) It was located on an embankment 3 miles 52 chains (5.87 km) from Bristol Temple Meads and 122 miles 3 chains (196.40 km) from the Great Western Railway terminus at London Paddington. (Note: Railways in the United Kingdom are, for historical reasons, measured in miles and chains. There are 80 chains to the mile.) The station closed in January 1856,

The line through Ashton remained open after the station closed. The line had been reconstructed as mixed-gauge by 1 June 1875 to accommodate local traffic. A year later in 1876, the Bristol & Exeter was amalgamated into the Great Western Railway, which took over services. Broad-gauge trains ceased operation on 20 May 1892.

Preceding station	Historical railways	Following station
Bristol Temple Meads	Bristol and Exeter Railway (1841 or 1852 – 1856)	Nailsea and Backwell

== Second station ==
The station was reopened by the Great Western Railway in 1926, now called Long Ashton Platform; Ashton by then was the name of a station on the Teign Valley Line in Devon. Again, the exact date of opening is disputed: most sources state 12 July 1926, but some say 20 September the same year. It was located on the same site as the first station.

The station was a basic halt, and had two 400 × 10 feet (121.9 × 3.0 m) platforms. A corrugated iron shelter and lamp hut were provided on the westbound platform, and a small booking office was present on the road to the platform. The estimated cost of construction was £1,930.

The station was renamed Long Ashton on 23 September 1929, and closed on 6 October 1941. There is now no trace of it left, and the site is now partly under the A370 Long Ashton Bypass causeway.

Preceding station	Historical railways	Following station
Bedminster	Great Western Railway; Bristol to Exeter line (1926-27)	Flax Bourton; Line open, station closed.
Parson Street	Great Western Railway; Bristol to Exeter line (1927-41)	Flax Bourton; Line open, station closed.

== Future ==
Plans were submitted in 2010 to reopen the station as part of the University of Bristol's Fenswood Farm development, which, if granted planning permission, will comprise some 1,200 houses, businesses and a school spread over 35 hectares (86 acres). The new station would be up to 1 mile (1.6 km) west of the original location. The University notes that there is positive support for the station, but that it alone cannot guarantee its construction. Long Ashton parish councillor Anthony Butcher opposes the development, but supports the reopening of the station. The station could be reopened as part of the Greater Bristol Metro scheme, a rail transport plan approved in July 2012 which aims to enhance transport capacity in the Bristol area.

The Bristol to Exeter line through Long Ashton is not currently electrified. The 21st-century modernisation of the Great Western Main Line will see the line from London to Bristol electrified, but electrification will not extend beyond Bristol to Weston-super-Mare. The group Friends of Suburban Bristol Railways supports the electrification continuing to Weston, as does Member of Parliament for Weston-super-Mare, John Penrose.
