= Nailsea & Backwell railway station =

Railway station near Bristol, England

Nailsea & Backwell
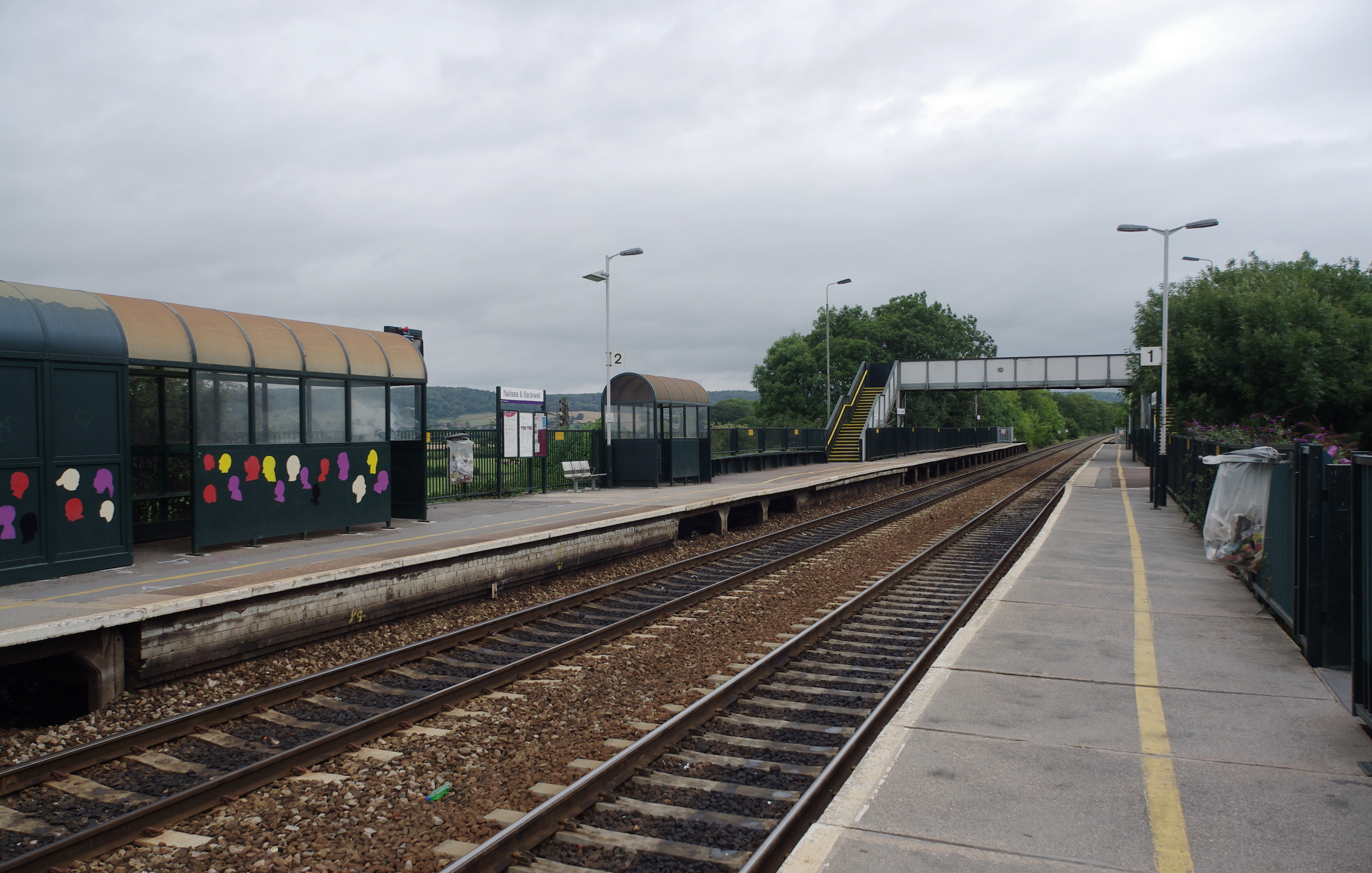
- Looking east along the platforms.

General information
- Location: Backwell, North Somerset; England
- Coordinates: 51.4195°N 2.7503°W
- Grid reference: ST479692
- Manager: Great Western Railway
- Platforms: 2

Other information
- Station code: NLS
- Classification: DfT category F2

History
- Original company: Bristol and Exeter Railway
- Pre-grouping: Great Western Railway
- Post-grouping: Great Western Railway

Key dates
- 14 June 1841: Opened as 'Nailsea'
- 1 July 1964: Closed to goods traffic

Passengers
- 2021/22: ▲0.298 million
- 2022/23: ▲0.414 million
- 2023/24: ▲0.438 million
- 2024/25: ▲0.476 million
- 2025/26: ▲0.510 million
Location
Notes
- Passenger statistics from the Office of Rail and Road

Nailsea & Backwell railway station, on the Bristol to Exeter line, is in the village of Backwell, close to the town of Nailsea in North Somerset, England. It is 8 miles (13 km) west of Bristol Temple Meads railway station, and 126 miles (203 km) from London Paddington. The station, opened in 1841 by the Bristol and Exeter Railway, has two platforms but little in the way of facilities. It is managed by Great Western Railway, which provides all train services at the station, mainly hourly services between Avonmouth and Weston-super-Mare, and between Cardiff Central and Taunton.

== History ==
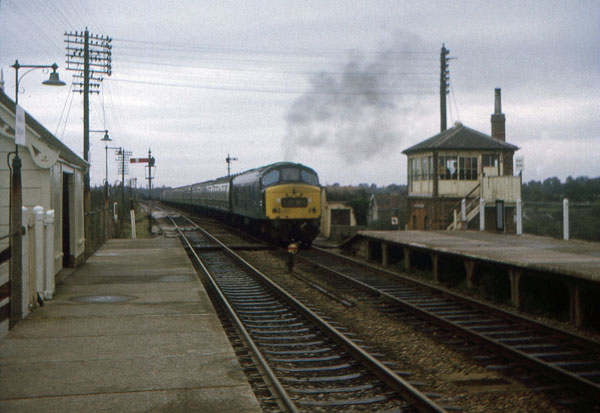
Nailsea & Backwell in 1971, showing the signal box on the eastbound platform.

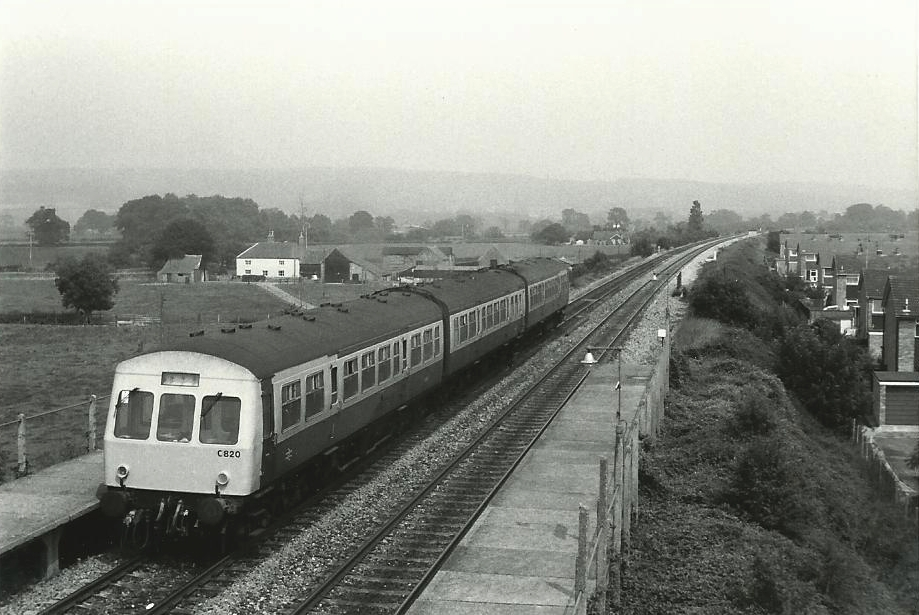
In 1982, a British Rail Class 101 DMU departs Nailsea & Backwell with a service for Cardiff.

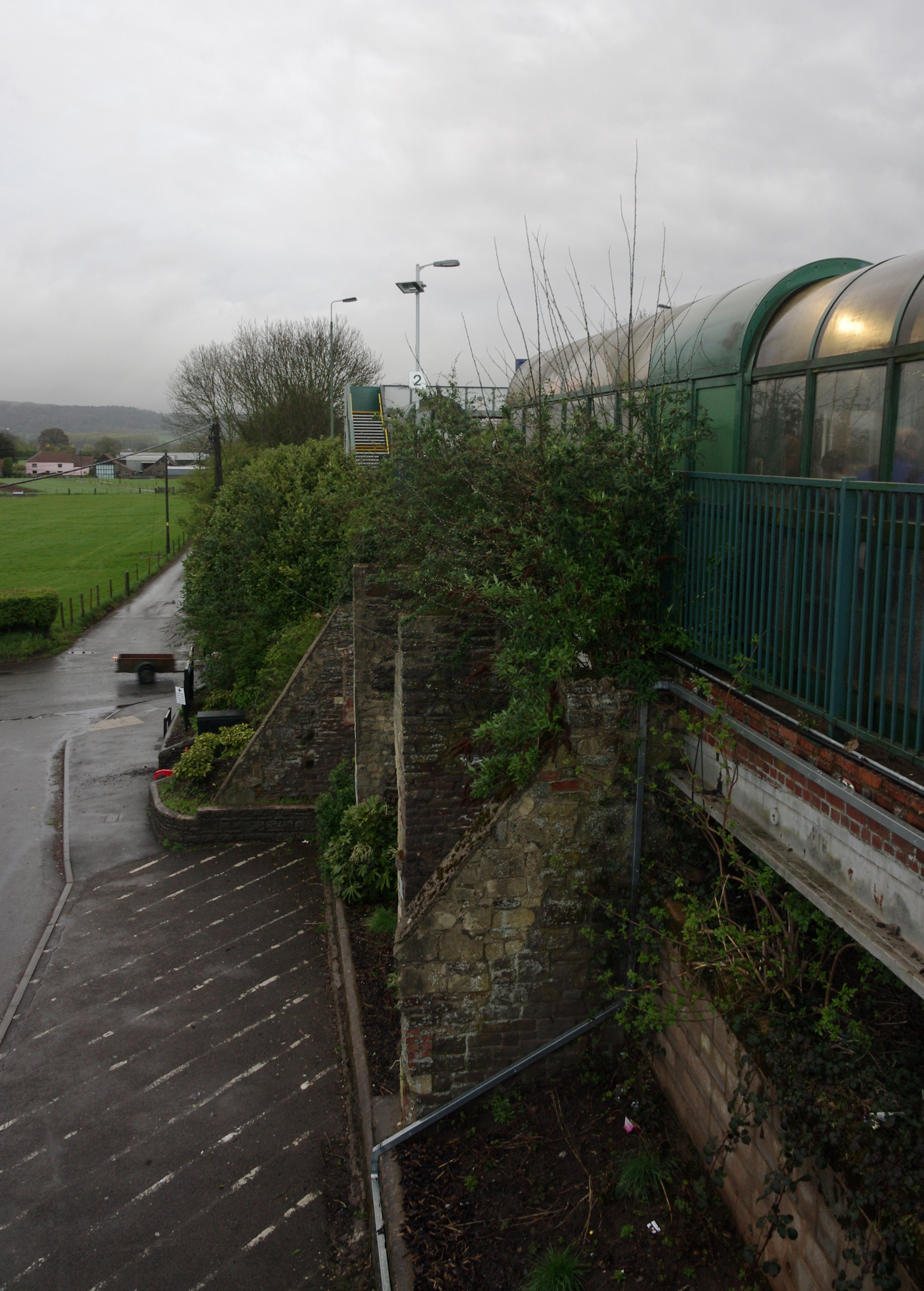
The foundations of the demolished station buildings are still visible.

The first section of the Bristol and Exeter Railway's (B&ER) main line opened on 14 June 1841 between Bristol and Bridgwater. Opened as "Nailsea", it was for a while the first station on the line west of Bristol, the next being Clevedon Road (which was renamed Yatton in 1847). (Note: Flax Bourton was constructed in 1860 between Bristol and Nailsea; however, there was an earlier station at Long Ashton, but sources are inconsistent about whether the station opened with the line in 1841, or later in 1852. There is general agreement among such sources that the station, called "Ashton", closed in 1856; however other sources, e.g. Oakley (2002), do not mention this station at all.) The line, engineered by Isambard Kingdom Brunel, was built as 7 ft (2,134 mm) broad-gauge but it had been reconstructed as a mixed-gauge line to accommodate local 4 ft 8 1/2 in (1,435 mm)-gauge traffic by 1 June 1875. Services were operated by the Great Western Railway (GWR) on behalf of the B&ER until 1 May 1849. The B&ER then took over its own workings until the company was amalgamated into the GWR on 1 January 1876. Broad-gauge trains ceased operation on 20 May 1892.

Due to its being built on an embankment, lightweight building materials were used for the station: the platforms originally rested on timber supports for most of their length. Station buildings, including a goods shed and a combined ticket office and waiting room, were built on the eastbound platform in the 1860s. There was a signal box on the eastbound platform by the 1880s which controlled a crossover between the two tracks; sidings at the west end of the station were controlled by a second signal box, and had a connection to the Nailsea Colliery. A footbridge, built by E. Finch and Co. of Chepstow, was erected in 1907; until then access between the two platforms was by a track-level crossing. This wooden footbridge was replaced by a metal one in the 1950s. The station was renamed "Nailsea and Backwell" on 1 May 1905.

When the railways were nationalised in 1948, the GWR became the Western Region of British Railways. Goods traffic from the station ceased on 1 June 1964. The main station buildings were demolished in the 1970s, but their foundations can still be seen behind the shelters on the eastbound platform. The shelter on the westbound platform was still present in 1986. In the 1980s the car park was expanded, and new metal and glass shelters were provided. The station reverted to the name "Nailsea" on 6 May 1974, and was still known by that name at the end of 1994. (Note: Oakley's 1983 work Railways in Avon, a short history of their development and decline 1832 – 1982 does not mention the station being called Nailsea; however, both Butt and Oakley's 2002 book Somerset railway stations make reference to the name change. Butt's directory, published in 1995, is accurate up to the end of 1994, and makes no mention of the station going back to being called Nailsea & Backwell. Oakley's 2002 book does not give a date for when the name switched back, merely saying that it had done so by the time the author visited.)

British Rail was split into business-led sectors in the 1980s, at which time operations at Nailsea & Backwell passed to Regional Railways. Local services were franchised to Wales & West when the railway was privatised in 1997, which was in turn succeeded by Wessex Trains, an arm of National Express, in 2001. The Wessex franchise was amalgamated with the Great Western franchise into the Greater Western franchise from 2006, and responsibility passed to First Great Western, a subsidiary company of FirstGroup. The franchise was rebranded as Great Western Railway in 2015.

Extra seating was provided in 2006 following action by the Severnside Community Rail Partnership, and in 2008 overgrown foliage was cleared from the car park to improve sightlines and help with security. The station was repainted at the same time, and decorated with silhouettes of students from Backwell School. The embankment suffered subsidence in 2013.

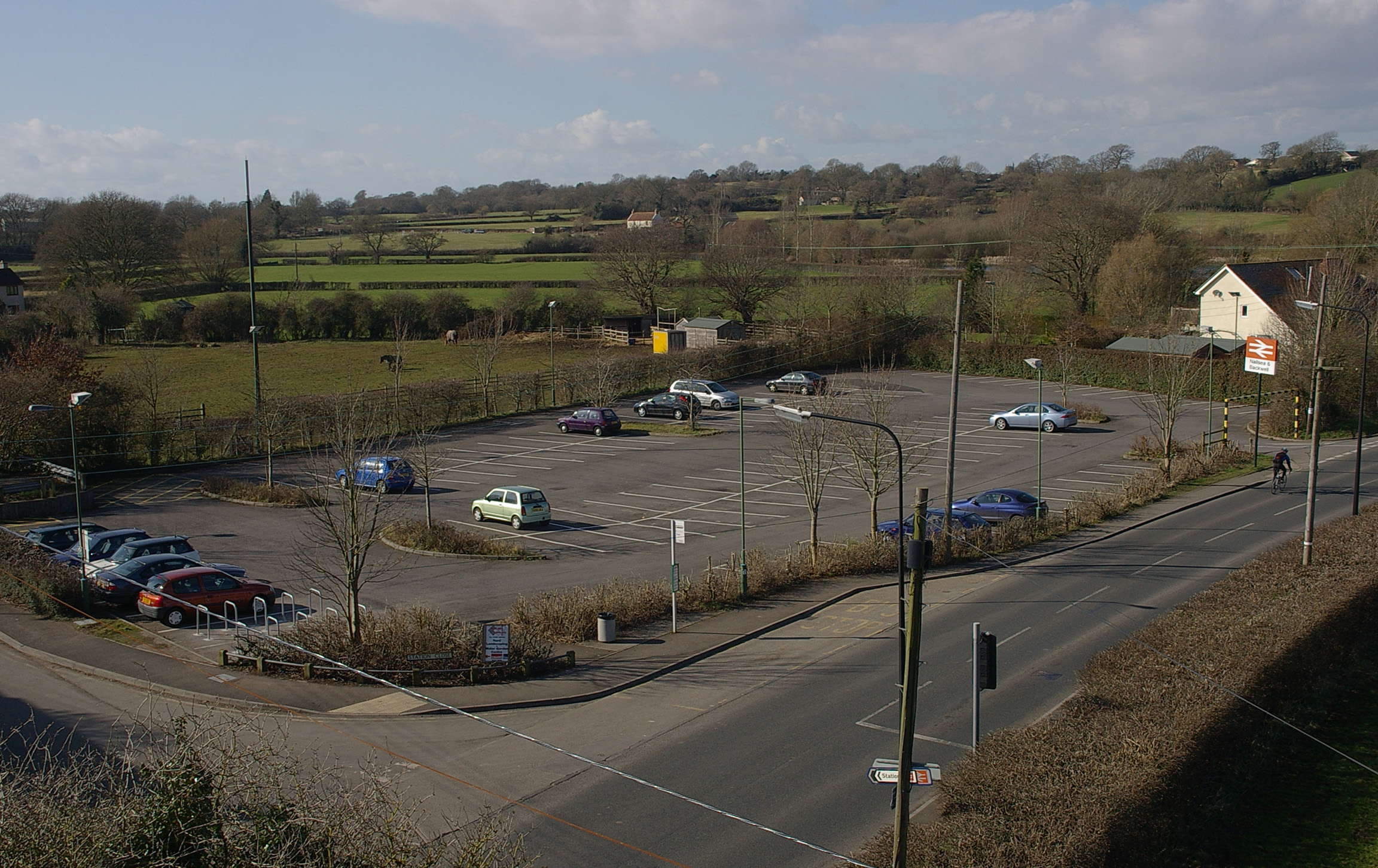
The old station car park. Empty on a Sunday, but regularly full at 07:30 on weekdays.

In 2012, the station had a free car park with 120 spaces, but this was frequently full by 07:30 on weekdays, leading commuters to park on local roads, prompting complaints from Backwell residents. Plans to extend the car park by 200 spaces were drawn up in 2009, with North Somerset Council describing the scheme as "necessary", as the lack of spaces limited the number of people who could feasibly use the station for commuting due to Nailsea being too far from the station to be an easy walk, causing people to drive to the station. That peak passengers filled the car park then meant there are no spaces for offpeak users, limiting leisure travel. North Somerset Council approved the construction of the extension on 17 April 2012, and further approved the car park becoming pay and display - all car parks in Nailsea had previously been free. Work began in January 2014, and was completed in June the same year - 162 additional car parking spaces were created, drainage was improved and CCTV was installed. The scheme, which cost £700,000, came in £50,000 under budget and was paid for using money from the Local Transport Plan and Community Infrastructure Levy. Parking prices were raised in 2017 to equalise the cost with Yatton railway station, and thus dissuade people from driving from Yatton to Nailsea for cheaper parking.

There is no wheelchair access to the southbound platform; the ramp to the northbound platform is steeper than 1 in 12, making it unsuitable for wheelchair users, and there is a large height difference from the train doors to the platform. In 2011, the government announced a £37.5 million scheme to improve stations under an "Access For All Mid-Tier programme", of which £1 million was to go towards building new ramps at Nailsea & Backwell. The works were due to start in 2013, but were delayed until 2014 due to a need to repair subsidence on the embankment and wait for works on the car park to be completed. However, due to the delays the funding was withdrawn. Further funding was secured in 2015, but plans for ramps were shelved entirely in 2016 due to fears of further subsidence. Great Western Railway stated in 2016 they are looking at installing lifts instead.

Preceding station	Historical railways	Following station
Bristol Temple Meads or Ashton	Bristol and Exeter Railway (1841-52)	Yatton
Ashton; Line open, station closed.	Bristol and Exeter Railway (1852-56)	Yatton
Bristol Temple Meads	Bristol and Exeter Railway (1856-60)	Yatton
Flax Bourton; Line open, station closed.	Bristol and Exeter Railway (1860-76)	Yatton
Flax Bourton; Line open, station closed.	Great Western Railway; Bristol to Exeter line (1876-1948)	Yatton
Flax Bourton; Line open, station closed.	Western Region of British Railways; Bristol to Exeter line (1948-63)	Yatton
Parson Street	Western Region of British Railways; Bristol to Exeter line (1963-82)	Yatton
Parson Street	Regional Railways; Bristol to Exeter line (1982-97)	Yatton
Parson Street	Wales & West; Bristol to Exeter line (1997-2001)	Yatton
Parson Street	Wessex Trains; Bristol to Exeter line (2001-06)	Yatton

== Description ==
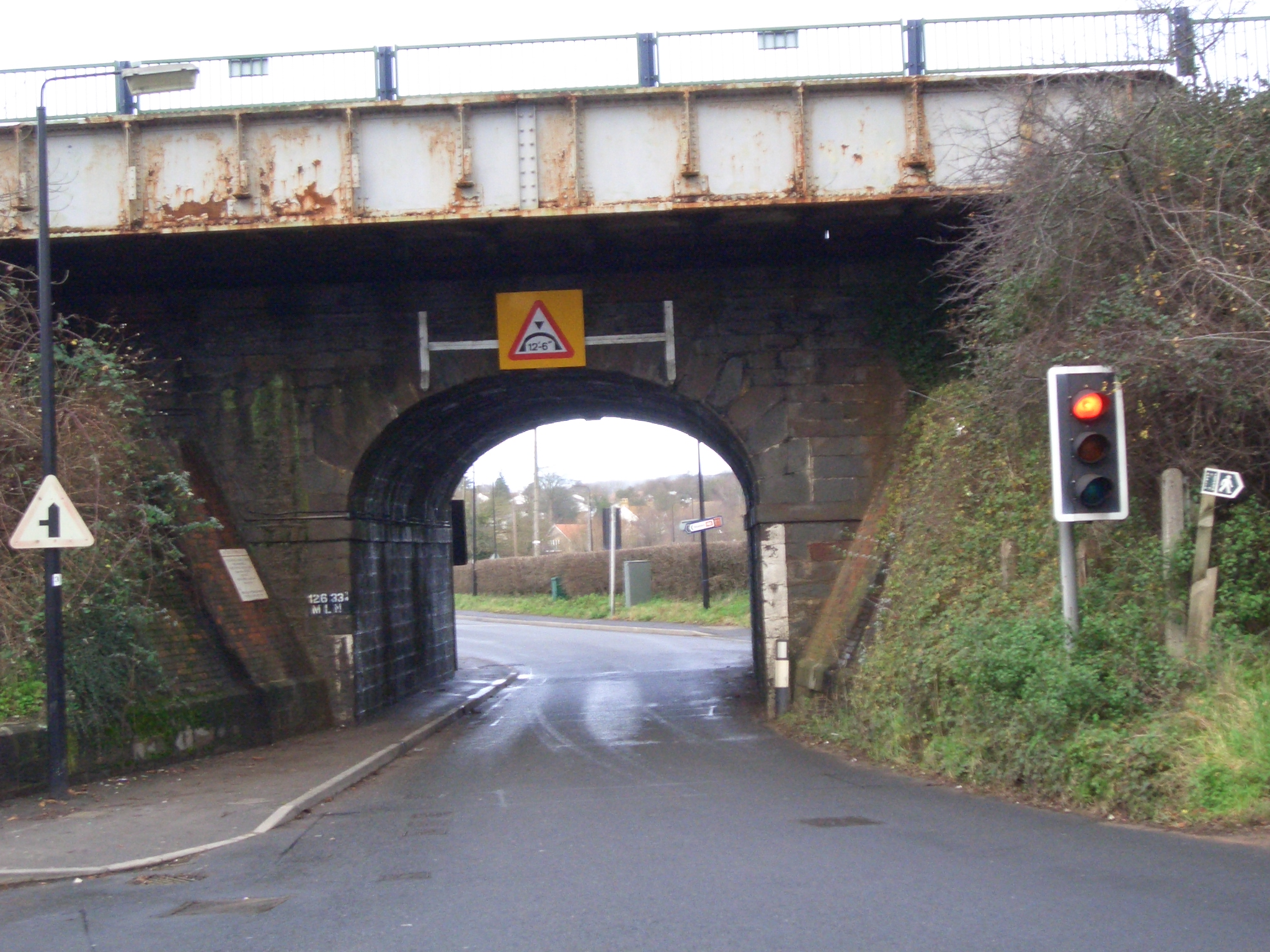
The road between Nailsea and Backwell passes under the station.

The station sits atop an embankment about 40 feet (12 m) high, and spans the main road between the settlements of Backwell and Nailsea, which narrows to a signal-controlled single lane to go under the railway. The station is on the Bristol to Exeter line, 126 miles 34 chains (203.46 km) from London Paddington and 8 miles 1 chain (12.89 km) from Bristol Temple Meads. (Note: Railways in the United Kingdom are, for historical reasons, measured in miles and chains. There are 80 chains to the mile.) It the third station along the line from Bristol. Nailsea is a short distance to the north, while the outskirts of Backwell are right against the south side of the station. The two settlements are primarily residential, and are, for large proportions of their residents, dormitory towns for Bristol.

The station has two platforms, separated by two running lines. The line runs on a slight curve through the station, at an angle of roughly 067 degrees, and has a linespeed of 100 miles per hour (160 km/h). The northern platform, platform 2, is 121 metres (132 yd) long and serves eastbound trains; the southern platform, platform 1, is 122 metres (133 yd) and serves westbound trains. Access to the two platforms is by steps from the road on either side. There is a ramp to the eastbound platform, but it has a gradient greater than 1 in 12, and there is no ramp access to trains. There is no ramp access to the westbound platform. Access between the platforms is either by a footbridge, or by walking along the main road under the line. There are metal and glass waiting shelters on both platforms – three on the eastbound platform, one on the westbound. Two ticket machines are situated on the north side of the station, which can also be used to collect pre-bought tickets. These machines are supplemented by a small ticket kiosk on the eastbound platform which is open during the morning peak. "Next train" dot-matrix displays and an automated public-address system announce approaching services.

To the north of the station is a pay and display car park with 285 car parking spaces, six motorcycle spaces and a number of cycle racks. Cycle storage is also available. The car park is run by North Somerset Council. There is a bus stop adjacent to the car park, with services between Bristol and Nailsea.

== Services ==
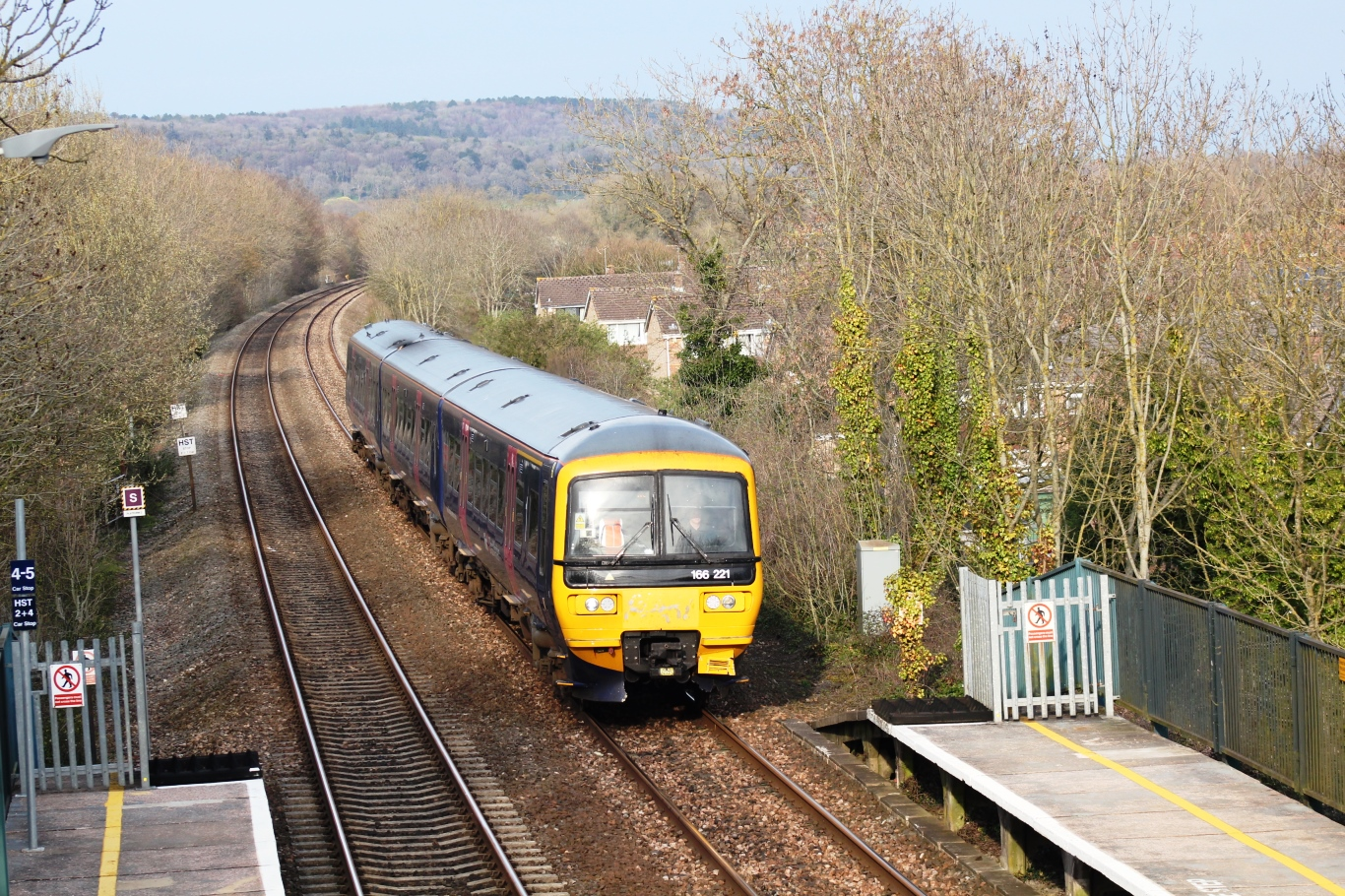
A Great Western Railway Class 166 with a local service to Weston-super-Mare.

The station is managed by Great Western Railway, who also operate all rail services from the station. The core service consists of two trains in each direction each hour. One is the Severn Beach to Weston-super-Mare service which calls at all stations, the other is the faster Cardiff Central to Taunton service, most of which are extended to Exeter St Davids or Penzance. There are also services between London Paddington and Weston-super-Mare which call at Nailsea & Backwell approximately every two hours. The typical journey time to Bristol Temple Meads is around 10–15 minutes and around 110 minutes to London.

Preceding station	National Rail	Following station
Parson Street	Great Western Railway (Severn Beach – Weston-super-Mare)	Yatton
Bristol Temple Meads	Great Western Railway (Cardiff Central – Penzance)	Yatton
Bristol Temple Meads	Great Western Railway (London Paddington – Weston-super-Mare)	Yatton

The station has adjacent bus stops, served by the First West of England number X7 bus between Bristol bus station, Nailsea and Clevedon, with an hourly service in each direction.

== Future ==
Nailsea & Backwell is on the Weston-super-Mare/Yate corridor, one of the main axes of the Greater Bristol Metro, a rail transport plan which aims to enhance transport capacity in the Bristol area. The group Friends of Suburban Bristol Railways supports the electrification of the line through Nailsea & Backwell, as does MP for Weston-super-Mare John Penrose. Railfuture in the South West has called for the station to be used to serve Bristol Airport via a bus link.

The 2017 West of England Joint Spatial Plan suggested that facilities and access to the station be improved to create a multimodal interchange with the Bristol MetroBus scheme, a link to the A370 Long Ashton Bypass and potentially to the M5 motorway at Clevedon. Parking and accessibility improvements are also suggested.

== Incidents ==
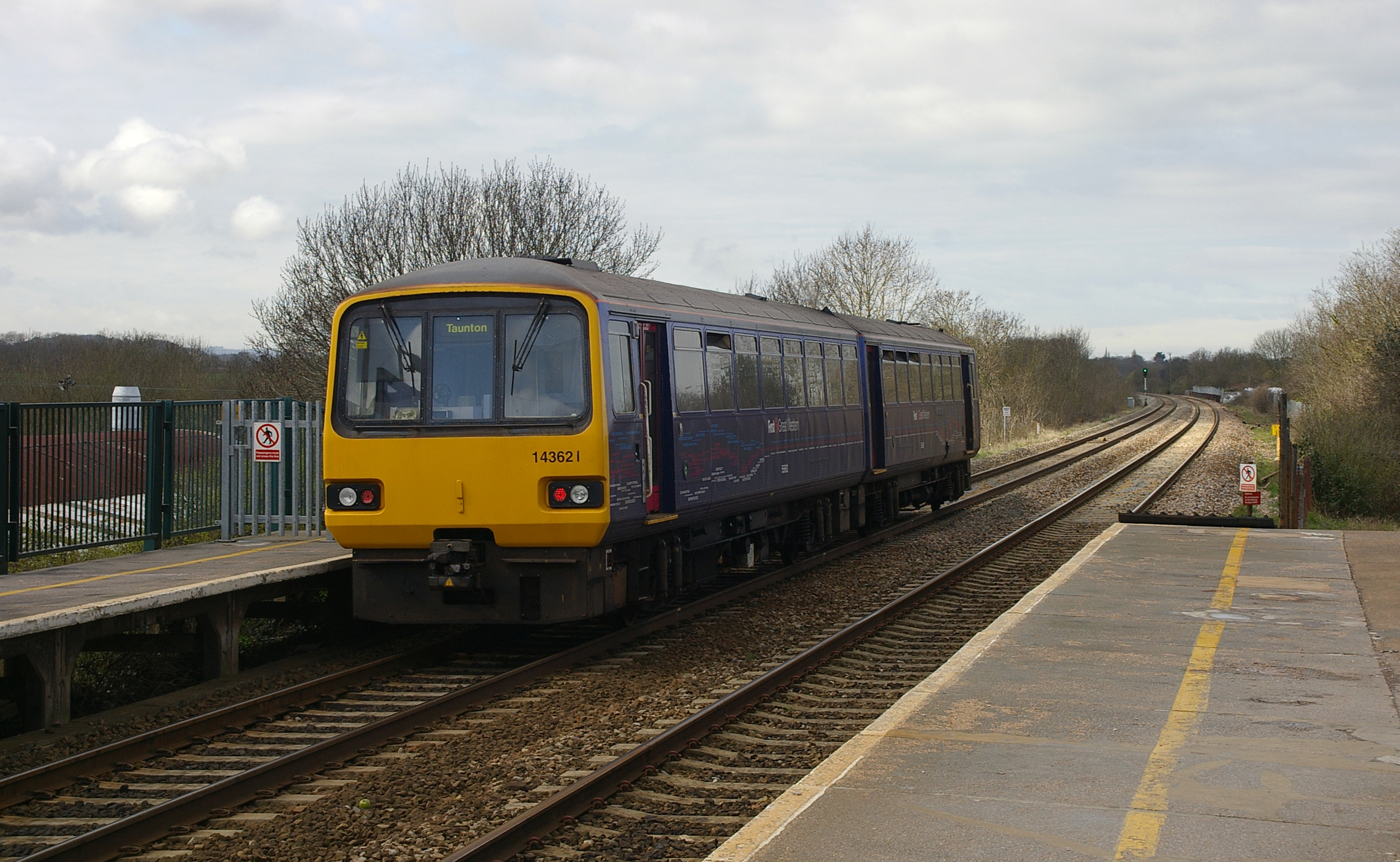
A Class 143 Pacer unit like this one caught fire near Nailsea & Backwell in 2004.

There have been several railway incidents in the Backwell area. On 20 September 2002, the 19:40 First Great Western service from Plymouth to Gloucester was delayed at Nailsea & Backwell at around 22:00 after the British Transport Police were called to deal with two men who assaulted a guard following an altercation about smoking in a non-smoking area. Several passengers were treated for the inhalation of CS gas. Another assault on a guard occurred on 9 October 2009, when three youths verbally abused and spat at the guard after boarding a train at Parson Street without tickets and refusing to pay for them. A 17-year-old from Weston-super-Mare was due in court on 23 December 2009 in connection with the incident, having been identified by the use of DNA swab kits, which are available to all Great Western Railway staff. A more unusual incident occurred on 18 September 2013 when a cow escaped from a nearby field and found its way onto the tracks at the station, causing several hours of delays to services between Bristol and Exeter.

A serious incident occurred on 17 October 2004, when Wessex Trains Class 143 Pacer DMU number 143613, forming the 20:06 2W63 service from Bristol Temple Meads to Weston-super-Mare with unit number 143621, caught fire between the site of the former station at Flax Bourton and Nailsea & Backwell. Fire services took two hours to get the blaze under control. None of the 23 passengers and crew were killed, but three were treated on-site for the effects of smoke inhalation. One carriage was completely burnt out, and the other was badly damaged, causing the train to be written off. The line through Nailsea was closed until 03:30 the following morning, when the train was hauled to St Philips Marsh Traction and Rolling Stock Maintenance Depot for examination. The unit was later taken to Crewe Works, where it was stored, then to Cardiff Canton TMD where it was scrapped. The Rail Safety and Standards Board issued a report into the incident, concluding that the fire was caused by electrical arcing between the live starter motor cable (which had damaged insulation) and the unit's underframe, causing accumulated oily residues to ignite.

On 8 January 2018, Andrew Tavener, a Nailsea resident, was struck by a train at the station, then arrested on suspicion of murdering his wife, Claire Tavener, earlier that day. He was taken to hospital with "life changing injuries". He was subsequently sentenced to life in prison for the murder.

The station creates a height and width restriction on the road below, which in 2020 led to a bus becoming wedged under the station. The road and railway were both closed while the bridge was structurally assessed. There have been several previous incidents of tall vehicles becoming stuck.

== See also ==
- Nailsea (Transport)
