= Bedminster railway station =

Railway station in Bristol, England

Bedminster
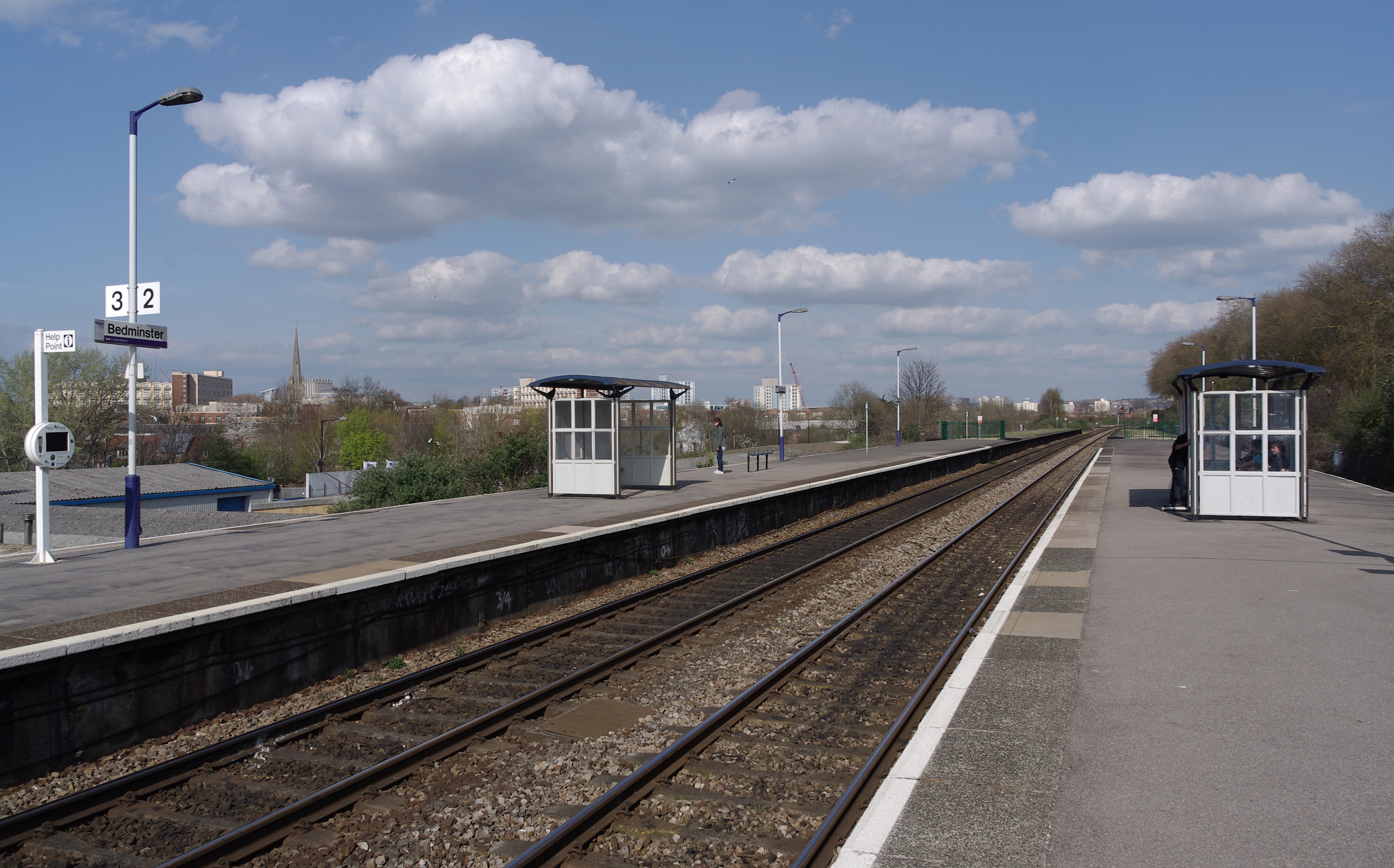
- Looking east along the platforms.

General information
- Location: Bedminster, Bristol; England
- Coordinates: 51.4403°N 2.5944°W
- Grid reference: ST589715
- Manager: Great Western Railway
- Platforms: 3

Other information
- Station code: BMT
- Classification: DfT category F1

History
- Original company: Bristol and Exeter Railway
- Pre-grouping: Great Western Railway
- Post-grouping: Great Western Railway

Key dates
- 1871: Station opened as Ashton
- 27 May 1884: Resited
- 30 April 1932: Rebuilt with four tracks
- 1 June 1964: Closed to goods traffic

Passengers
- 2021/22: ▲63,064
- 2022/23: ▲0.103 million
- 2023/24: ▲0.123 million
- 2024/25: ▲0.141 million
- 2025/26: ▲0.147 million
Location
Notes
- Passenger statistics from the Office of Rail and Road

Bedminster railway station is on the Bristol to Exeter line and serves the districts of Bedminster and Windmill Hill in Bristol, south-west England. It is 0.9 miles (1.4 km) to the west of Bristol Temple Meads, and 119 miles (192 km) from London Paddington. Its three letter station code is BMT. It was opened in 1871 by the Bristol and Exeter Railway, was resited slightly further to the west in 1884 and was rebuilt in 1932. The station, which has three through-lines and two island platforms, but minimal facilities, is managed by Great Western Railway which operates all train services that serve the station, mainly an hourly service between Avonmouth and Weston-super-Mare.

The level of service is proposed to be increased by two trains per hour between Portishead and Bristol when the Portishead Branch Line reopens.

== History ==
The first section of the Bristol and Exeter Railway's main line opened on 14 June 1841 between Bristol and Bridgwater. The station at Bedminster opened in 1871 and may have originally known as 'Ashton'. (Note: The only known publication which refers to the station being named 'Ashton' appears in Butt's Directory of Railway Stations. It would seem strange to name a station in Bedminster after a different suburb of Bristol and timetables published later in the 1870s showed it as Bedmintser.) It was on the site of an earlier excursion platform which had closed in about 1870. Sited approximately 57 chains (1.1 km) from the Bristol & Exeter's northern terminus at Bristol Temple Meads and 119 miles 08 chains (191.7 km) from the Great Western Railway's London terminus at Paddington, there were two tracks, both originally 7 ft (2,134 mm) broad-gauge, but the line was reconstructed as a mixed gauge line to accommodate local 4 ft 8 1/2 in (1,435 mm)-gauge traffic by 1 June 1875. On 1 January 1876, the Bristol and Exeter was amalgamated into the Great Western Railway (GWR), who took over services.

The station was certainly named 'Bedminster' by 1884, when on 27 May the original station closed and a new station was opened some 14 chains (280 m) west. There were two separate platforms, one on each side of the two tracks. Broad-gauge trains ceased operation on 20 May 1892, and in 1908 the new station was extended, with the addition of ornate station buildings and a footbridge at the west end of the platforms. Until the opening of Parson Street in 1927, Bedminster had served as the first station for trains heading for the Portishead Branch Line, which served the town of Portishead, the villages of Pill and Portbury, and the south side of the River Avon.

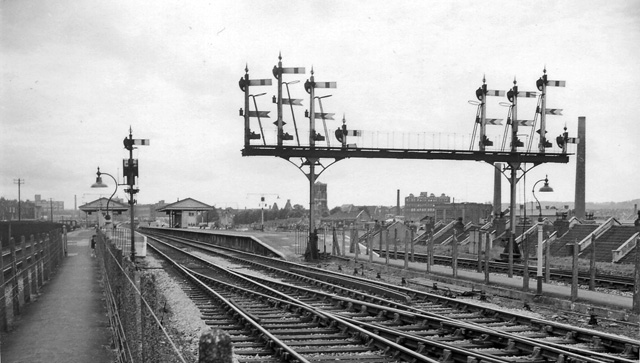
The rebuilt station in 1963, viewed from the east.

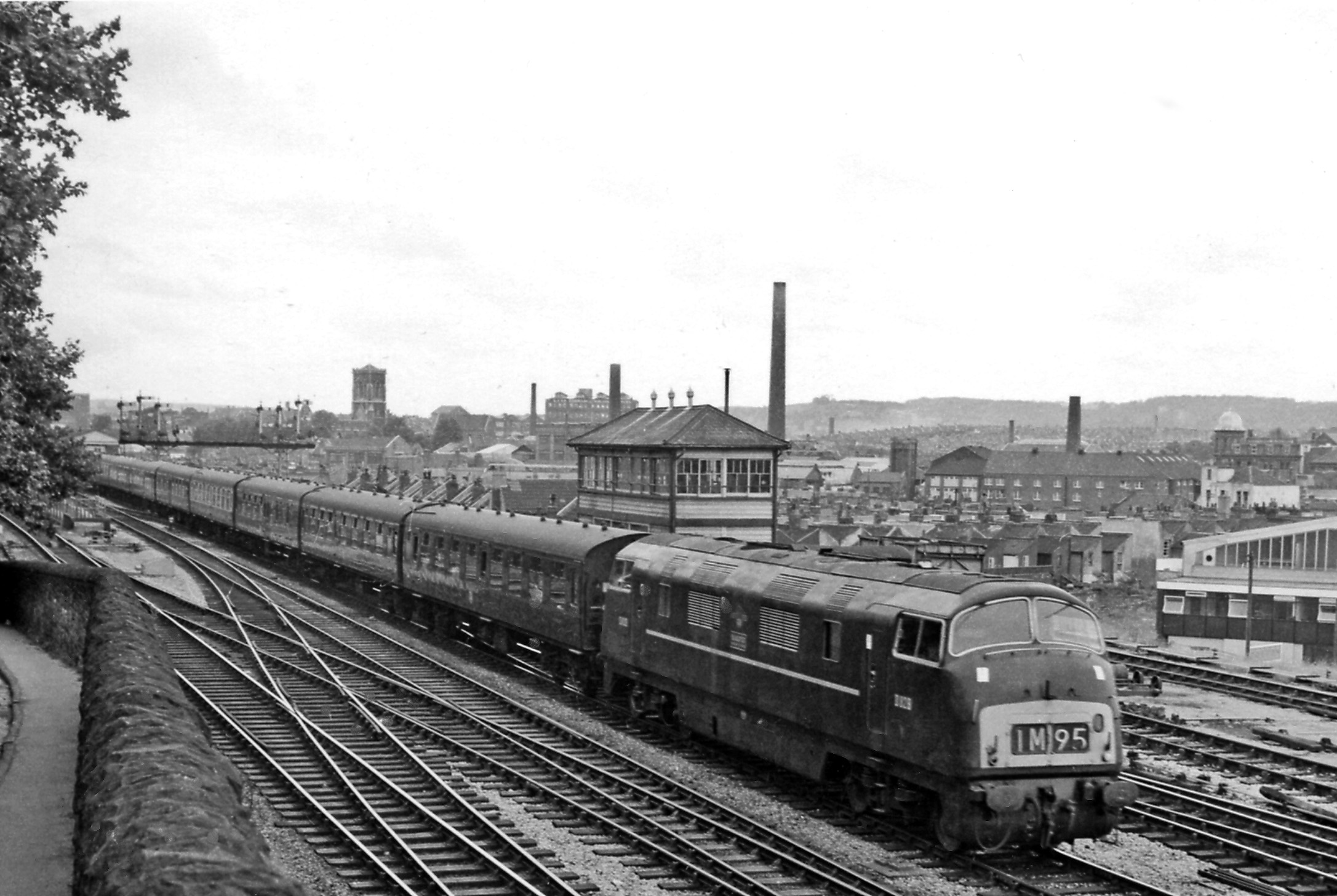
An express train passes Bedminster in 1963. The signal box is visible in the background.

The station was rebuilt in the early 1930s to enable the line to be four-tracked. The ornate buildings were demolished, and were replaced by more austere buildings on two island platforms between the tracks, including two waiting rooms, ticket and parcel offices. The new station was completed on 30 April 1932 and was accessed, as now, by a subway from Fraser Street. The station employed 15 men in 1938. There was a 74 lever signal box to the east of the northern platform, and also a small siding to serve local coal merchants.

When the railways were nationalised in 1948, the GWR became the Western Region of British Railways. Goods traffic at Bedminster ceased from 1 June 1964, traffic to Portishead ended with the closure of that line in September the same year, and the station became unstaffed from 23 September 1968. The signal box was taken out of service in April 1970, and by 1979 all the station buildings had been demolished.

British Rail was split into business-led sectors in the 1980s, at which time operations at Bedminster passed to Regional Railways. Local services were franchised to Wales & West when the railway was privatised in 1997, which was in turn succeeded by Wessex Trains in 2001. The Wessex franchise was amalgamated with the Great Western franchise into the Greater Western franchise from 2006, and responsibility passed to First Great Western, rebranded in 2015 as Great Western Railway.

In 2010, the Severnside Community Rail Partnership began a comprehensive scheme to improve the station. The work included removing foliage from the platforms, new lighting and artwork for the subway, community display panels and the installation of help points. The subway artwork came third in the arts category at the 2011 Community Rail Awards.

Preceding station	Historical railways	Following station
Bristol Temple Meads	Bristol and Exeter Railway (1871–1875)	Flax Bourton; Line open, station closed.
Bristol Temple Meads	Great Western Railway; Bristol and Exeter Railway (1876–1926)	Flax Bourton; Line open, station closed.
Bristol Temple Meads	Great Western Railway; Bristol and Exeter Railway (1926–1927)	Long Ashton; Line open, station closed.
Bristol Temple Meads	Great Western Railway; Bristol and Exeter Railway (1927–1948)	Parson Street
Bristol Temple Meads	Western Region of British Railways; Bristol to Exeter line (1948–1982)	Parson Street
Bristol Temple Meads	Regional Railways; Bristol to Exeter line (1982–1997)	Parson Street
Bristol Temple Meads	Wales & West; Bristol to Exeter line (1997–2001)	Parson Street
Bristol Temple Meads	Wessex Trains; Bristol to Exeter line (2001–2006)	Parson Street
Bristol Temple Meads	Bristol and Exeter Railway; Portishead Branch Line (1871–1875)	Clifton Bridge; Line open, station closed.
Bristol Temple Meads	Great Western Railway; Portishead Branch Line (1876–1906)	Clifton Bridge; Line open, station closed.
Bristol Temple Meads	Great Western Railway; Portishead Branch Line (1906–1927)	Ashton Gate; Line open, station closed.
Bristol Temple Meads	Great Western Railway; Portishead Branch Line (1927–1948)	Parson Street
Bristol Temple Meads	Western Region of British Railways; Portishead Branch Line (1948–1964)	Parson Street

== Description ==
The station is built on the lower northern slopes of Windmill Hill, on the Bristol to Exeter line 119 miles 22 chains (191.95 km) from London Paddington and 71 chains (1.43 km) from Bristol Temple Meads. (Note: Railways in the United Kingdom are, for historical reasons, measured in miles and chains. There are 80 chains to the mile.) It the first station along the line from Bristol. To the south of the station is a primarily residential area, with terraced houses and several tower blocks; while to the north is an industrial estate and shopping area. The railway line serves as the boundary between the Southville and Windmill Hill council wards, although the area is generally considered part of Bedminster, it is not part of the Bedminster council ward. The area is also served by Parson Street railway station, 74 chains (1.49 km) further along the line.

The station has two island platforms, each 240 yards (220 m) long, but only the first 100–110 yards (90–100 m) are in use, the rest fenced off. Platform 1 is on the north side of the southern island, on the "Down Main" line serving westbound trains, the other side of the island is not in use, having been converted to a carriage siding. Platforms 2 and 3 are on the northern island. Platform 3, on the north side "Up Relief" line, is used exclusively for eastbound trains. Platform 2, on the south side "Up Main" line, is used mostly for eastbound trains, but can be used for westbound services, as the line is signalled for bidirectional running. There is a carriage siding on the south side of the southern island, coming from the east and terminating within the station limits. The speed limit through the station is 90 miles per hour (140 km/h) on the Down Main and eastbound on the Up Main. The Up Relief and westbound Up Main have a speed limit of 40 miles per hour (64 km/h), the siding has a speed limit of 25 miles per hour (40 km/h). The line is not electrified.

Access between the platforms is via a subway with ramps at the west end of the platforms, although the station is not considered completely accessible as the ramps are steeper than 1 in 12. The subway exits onto Fraser Street, which is the sole entrance to the station. The subway is decorated with murals painted by local schoolchildren, reflecting the history and culture of Bristol.

Facilities at the station are minimal – there is a metal and glass shelter on each of the two islands, and a bench on the eastbound island. The station is unstaffed, but there is a self-service ticket machine. There are customer help points, giving next train information for both platforms. There is no car park or taxi rank, and the nearest bus stop is 200 yards (180 m) away on Malago Road. There is some cycle storage available.

== Services ==
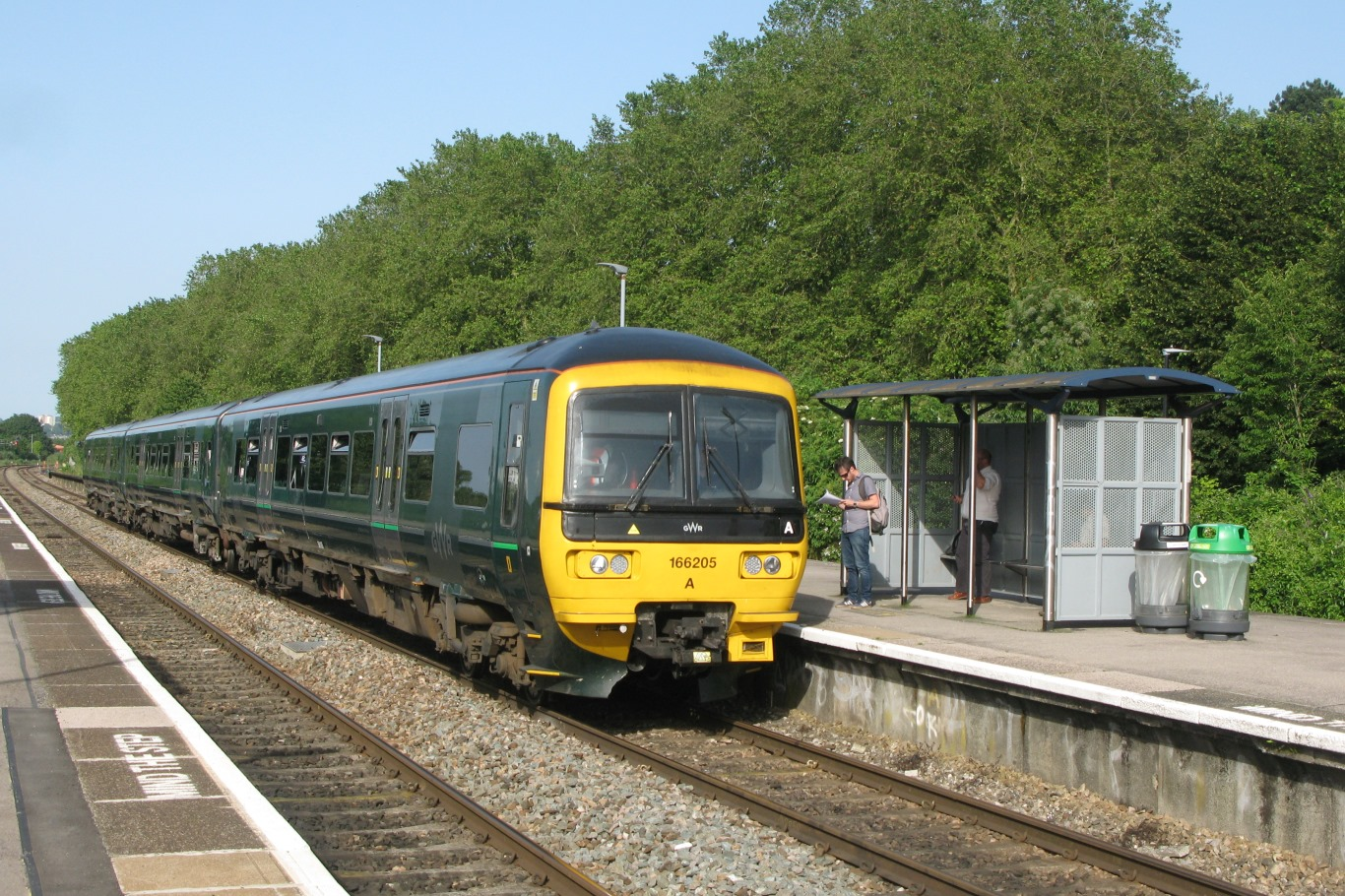
A Class 166 arrives at Bedminster working a Weston-super-Mare service

The station is managed by Great Western Railway, who also operate all rail services from the station. As of the May 2024 timetable, the basic service from Monday to Friday consists of one train in each direction per hour between Avonmouth and Weston-super-Mare, calling at all stations, with northbound services generally continuing to Severn Beach. Some trains working between Cardiff and Taunton or Exeter St Davids call at peak hours and in the evening. All weekday trains at Bedminster also stop at Parson Street westbound and Bristol Temple Meads eastbound. On Saturday there is a similar pattern, but with no services beyond Bristol Parkway or Weston-super-Mare except during the early morning and late evening. Sunday sees a reduced service, with trains not beginning until after 9am, then, following the typical one an hour in both directions there-forth. After that there is approximately one train every two hours, most of which do not call at Parson Street.

Services are operated by class 158 and 166 diesel multiple-units and Class 800. CrossCountry services between Scotland and the South West pass non-stop throughout the day, with Great Western Railway services between London Paddington and Weston-super-Mare passing through during the morning and evening peaks.

The typical journey time to Bristol Temple Meads is 4 minutes, while to Weston-super-Mare takes 33 minutes.

Preceding station	National Rail	Following station
Bristol Temple Meads	Great Western Railway (Severn Beach - Weston-super-Mare)	Parson Street

== Future ==
Bedminster is on the Weston-super-Mare/Yate corridor, one of the main axes of the Greater Bristol Metro, a rail transport plan which aims to enhance transport capacity in the Bristol area. As part of this scheme, the Portishead Branch Line, which runs along the south side of the River Avon from a junction just beyond Parson Street railway station, will be reopened. Trains along the line will likely serve Bedminster, with an aspiration of two trains per hour in peak periods. The line was built in the 1860s, but closed to passenger traffic in 1964, leaving Portishead as one of Britain's largest towns without a railway station. The line was reopened for freight traffic to serve Royal Portbury Docks in 2001. The scheme was given the go-ahead in July 2012 as part of the City Deal, whereby local councils would be given greater control over money by the government. Subject to final business case approval, construction work on the line is now expected to start in December 2021 and then take around two years to complete. Trains along the reopened line will operate between Portishead and Bristol Temple Meads, with two trains per hour in each direction. Services would call at Pill and Parson Street, with aspirations to also call at Bedminster and a reopened Ashton Gate. Trains could also be extended on to the Severn Beach Line. The line will be operated as part of the Greater Western passenger franchise.

The Down Relief line between Bristol Temple Meads and Parson Street is to be partially reinstated as part of the MetroWest scheme in order to ease congestion. According to the Great Western Route Utilisation Strategy, in the December 2007 timetable period, the line through Parson Street was running at over 75% capacity in the morning peak between 8 and 9am. It was predicted that by 2019, trains working the line would be completely full during peak hours. While the three tracks could cope with traffic generated by the reopening of the Portishead Line, campaigners note it would leave little room for growth. Parson Street Junction will also be upgraded during the works.

Preceding station	Future services	Following station
Bristol Temple Meads	Greater Western franchise Portishead Branch Line	Parson Street

== Incidents ==
There have been several railway incidents in the Bedminster area over the years. On 1 May 2001, a Class 153 unit passed a red signal near Bedminster, but was stopped before it could head on to the Main line from the Relief line in front of a High Speed Train. Three years later, on 23 September 2004, the 12:10 Wessex Trains service from Penzance to Bristol Temple Meads struck and killed a 12-year-old boy on the Up Relief line, who had been hiding under the platform. The death was ruled accidental.

What used to be the westbound relief line at Bedminster was converted into a carriage siding, and is used to stable trains to avoid clogging the platforms at Bristol Temple Meads. However, as the tracks are fairly easily accessible, such trains can be a magnet for vandals, causing First Great Western to offer a reward of £1000 in March 2007 to catch vandals who had been damaging and spray-painting the trains. More generally, there were 19 crimes reported at Bedminster railway station in 2007, and 14 in 2008. British Transport Police statistics noted a 53% reduction in reported crime at Bristol area stations between 2007 and 2012.

On 6 January 2009, the Windmill Hill bridge, just to the west of Bedminster station, was hit by a vehicle, causing some delays to train services while it was assessed for damage. The bridge was struck again on 17 December 2009, which stopped services for 40 minutes.

== See also ==
- Public transport in Bristol
