= Flax Bourton railway station =

Disused railway station in England

Flax Bourton
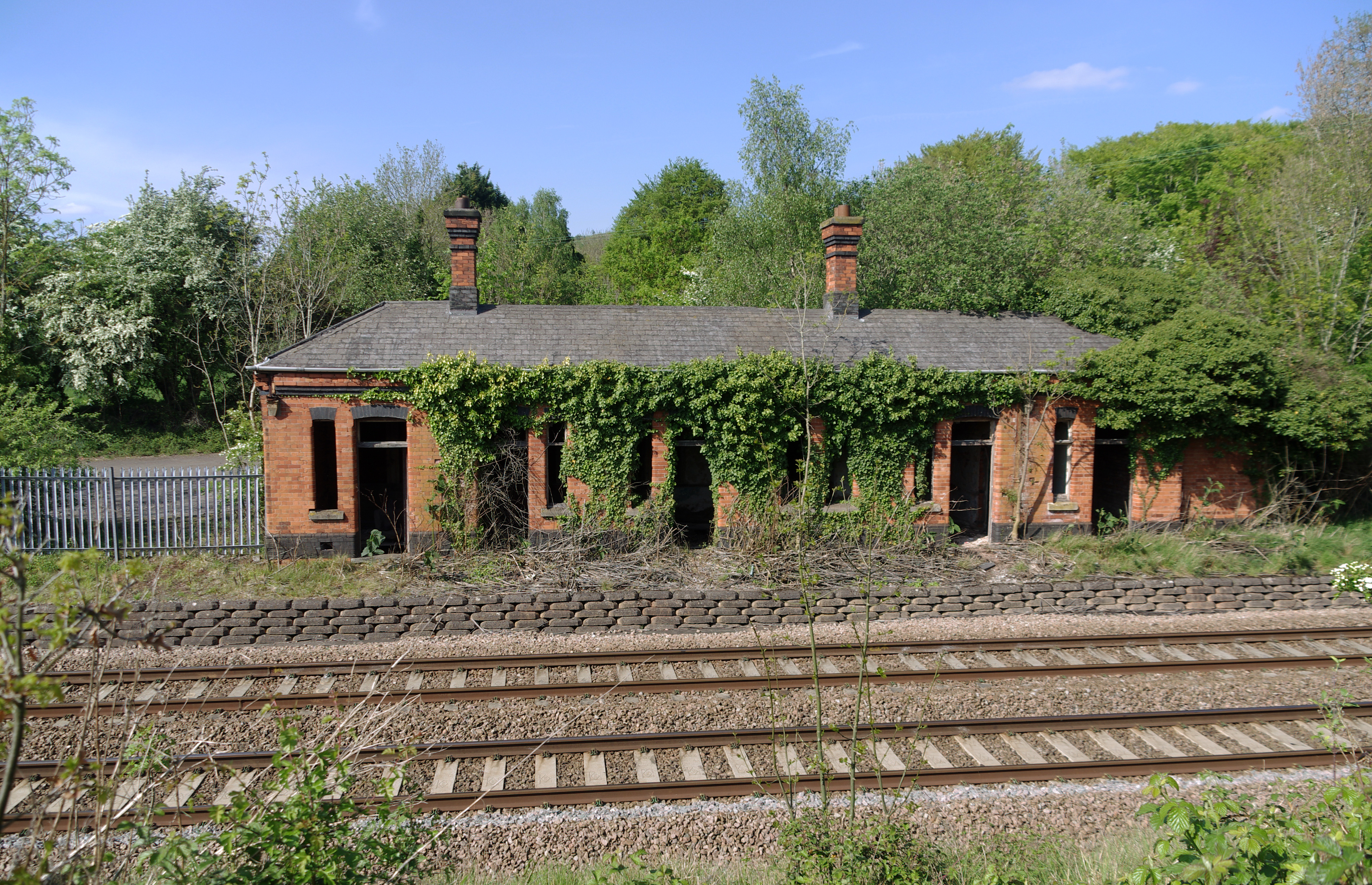
- The main building of the second station in 2011

General information
- Location: Flax Bourton, North Somerset; England
- Coordinates: 51.4247°N 2.7011°W
- Platforms: 2

Other information
- Status: Disused

History
- Original company: Bristol and Exeter Railway
- Pre-grouping: Great Western Railway

Key dates
- 1860: Opened as Bourton
- 2 March 1893: Second station opened, first closed
- 2 December 1963: Closed to passengers
- 1 July 1964: Closed to goods
Location

Flax Bourton railway station was a railway station on the Bristol to Exeter line, 5 miles 49 chains (9.03 km) from Bristol Temple Meads, serving the village of Flax Bourton in North Somerset. It opened in 1860, and was closed by the Beeching Axe in 1964.

== History ==
=== Opening ===
The first sections of the Bristol and Exeter Railway, those between Bristol and Bridgwater and the branch to Weston-super-Mare, opened on 14 June 1841. The station was first opened in 1860 as Bourton (51.4243°N 2.6954°W), roughly half a mile from the village of Flax Bourton in Somerset. Located in a deep cutting by the B3130 road from Bristol to Nailsea, just west of the short tunnel at the summit of the climb from Bristol, it was 124 miles 0 chains (199.56 km) from the Great Western Railway terminus at Paddington in London and 5 miles 49 chains (9.03 km) from the B&E's northern terminus at Bristol Temple Meads. (Note: Railways in the United Kingdom are, for historical reasons, measured in miles and chains. There are 80 chains to the mile.) When it opened it was the first station out of Bristol, taking the claim from Nailsea and Backwell, and remained so until Bedminster opened in 1871. The station was renamed Flax Bourton on 1 September 1888.

The line, engineered by Isambard Kingdom Brunel, was built as 7 ft (2,134 mm) broad gauge. The line had been reconstructed as a mixed gauge line to accommodate local 4 ft 8 1/2 in (1,435 mm) gauge traffic by 1 June 1875, and broad gauge trains ceased operation on 20 May 1892.

The original station's main building was at the Bristol (east) end of the eastbound platform, built of wood. A signal box was towards the centre of the platform. The platforms were accessed by paths from both north and south, linked by a timber footbridge on brick pillars. A station master's house was built on the road above the eastbound platform.

=== Expansion ===
Due to being in a cutting, expansion of the station was not possible, and when a need for larger facilities arose, a new station was built 21 chains (420 m; 460 yd) further west (124 miles 21 chains (199.98 km) from Paddington, 5 miles 70 chains (9.45 km) from Temple Meads), closer to the village. The new station opened on 2 March 1893, with the old station closing the same day. A large brick building was constructed on the eastbound platform with a large canopy, and a smaller building on the westbound platform. A covered footbridge linked the two platforms. There was a short relief line just east of the station, a siding on the west side led to a goods shed with canopies on both track and road sides, with a signal box adjacent. In 1956–7 the private Tyntesfield Sidings were laid just beyond the B3129 Station Road bridge, to serve a Ministry of Fuel and Power underground fuel depot.

=== Closure and dilapidation ===
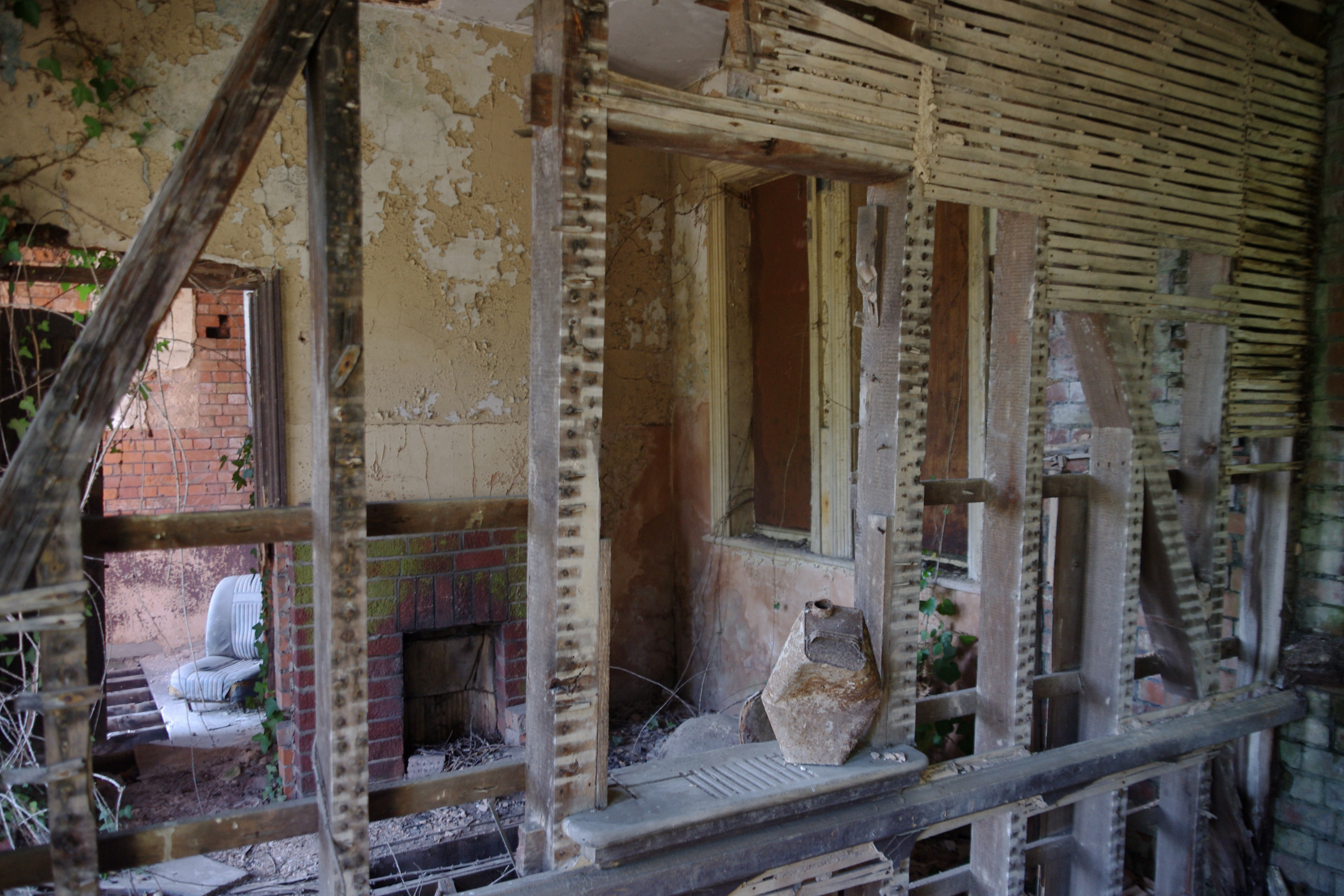
Inside the waiting room of the main station building. It has been derelict since the 1960s, and is boarded up.

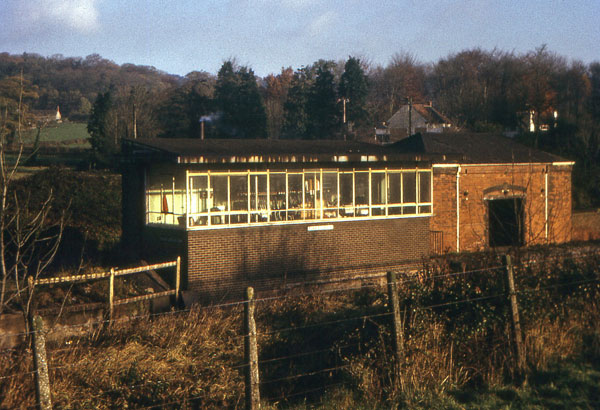
Flax Bourton signal box in the 1970s.

The station closed to passengers on 2 December 1963, a victim of the Beeching Axe. Goods traffic continued until 1 July 1964, although the private siding continued in use for some time. Of the first station all that remains is the footbridge (although the deck has been replaced with concrete), but it is just possible to make out the old paths down to the platforms. The station master's house is now in residential use.

More survives of the second station – the main building and goods shed on the eastbound platform are still in situ, albeit boarded-up and crumbling, at the end of a private residential road. The building on the westbound platform has been demolished, the platforms have been removed and the running lines slewed closer to the remaining station buildings. The relief line to the east has been removed. The fuel sidings were disconnected and the adjacent crossover points removed in February 2004.

One of the station buildings was damaged by arson on 7 April 2003.

== Services ==
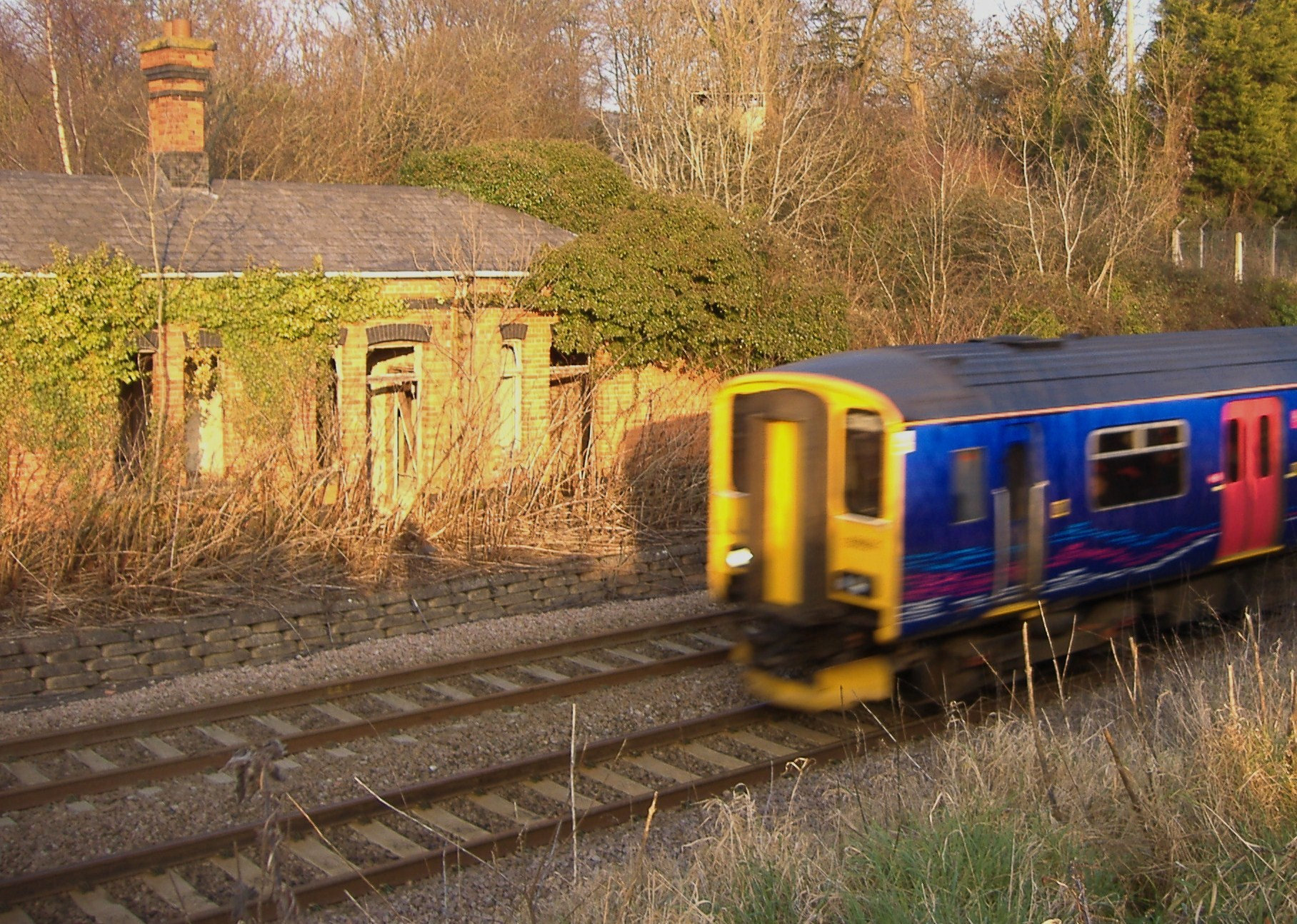
A First Great Western Class 150 diesel multiple unit speeds past the remains of the second Flax Bourton railway station in 2008. No trains have stopped at Flax Bourton since 1964, and the platforms have been removed.

Services were originally operated by the Bristol and Exeter Railway, continuing until the company was subsumed into the Great Western Railway in 1876. When the railways were nationalised under the Transport Act 1947, control passed to the Western Region of British Railways.

Preceding station	Historical railways	Following station
Bristol Temple Meads	Bristol and Exeter Railway (1860-71)	Nailsea and Backwell
Bedminster	Bristol and Exeter Railway (1871-76)	Nailsea and Backwell
Bedminster	Great Western Railway; Bristol to Exeter line (1876-1926)	Nailsea and Backwell
Long Ashton; Line open, station closed.	Great Western Railway; Bristol to Exeter line (1926-41)	Nailsea and Backwell
Parson Street	Great Western Railway; Bristol to Exeter line (1941-48)	Nailsea and Backwell
Parson Street	Western Region of British Railways; Bristol to Exeter line (1948-63)	Nailsea and Backwell

== Future ==
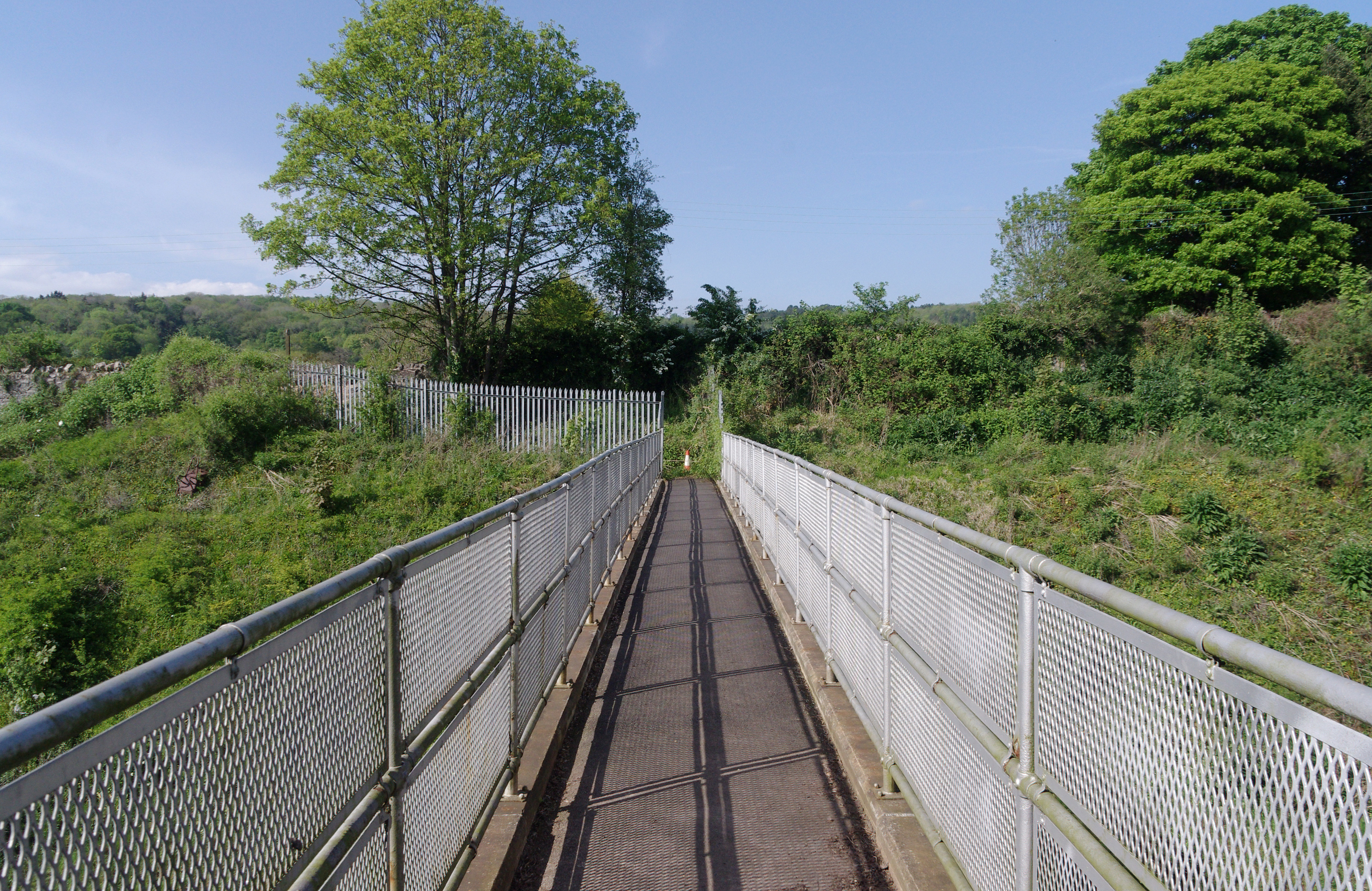
The footbridge of the first station is still present, although all other remains have long since been removed.

The old Tyntesfield Sidings were considered by the Mineral Industry Research Organisation as a possible railhead for the nearby Tarmac-operated limestone quarry at Stancombe. Such a plan would require a 1.5 kilometres (0.93 mi) conveyor, crossing the A370 and railway line. Reconnection to rail was listed as "feasible", but the scheme was not recommended for shortlisting, instead being listed as an "other possibility". A similar scheme was stopped in 1999 after local protests.

The Bristol to Exeter line through Flax Bourton is not currently electrified. The 21st Century modernisation of the Great Western Main Line will see the line from London to Bristol electrified, but electrification will not extend beyond Bristol to Weston-super-Mare. The group Friends of Suburban Bristol Railways supports the electrification continuing to Weston, as does MP for Weston-super-Mare John Penrose.

Many local travel groups have called for the reopening of Flax Bourton station. Friends of Suburban Bristol Railways in their Autumn 2011 newsletter called for the reopening to be considered in the reletting of the Greater Western passenger franchise. Campaign for Better Transport Bristol/Bath Travel Area submitted a statement to the House of Commons Transport Committee, which was published in 2008's Delivering a Sustainable Railway. In it, they called for the reopening of Flax Bourton railway station to serve Bristol Airport. Railfuture in the South West also called for the reopening as a way to serve the Airport. North Somerset Council also suggested the reopening of Flax Bourton station to help with the sustainability of new housing in the area.

Housing is planned to be built on the disused oil terminal.
