= West of England Joint Spatial Plan =

Housing development plan in the Bristol area

The West of England Joint Spatial Plan was a plan, published by the English authorities of Bath and North East Somerset, Bristol, North Somerset and South Gloucestershire, of where new housing and other facilities should be built within the former Avon county area. In 2019 it failed to be accredited by the Planning Inspectorate, leading to the possibility of the plan being withdrawn.

== Background ==
The plan outlined the need for 105,000 new homes to be built in the West of England area by 2036. The plan was submitted to central government in April 2018 for scrutiny, with a final decision said to be due in 2019.

Based on the spatial strategy, the supply would have been distributed between the unitary authorities, with Bath and North East Somerset responsible for 14,500 dwellings, Bristol City for 33,500, North Somerset for 25,000, and South Gloucestershire for 32,500 dwellings.

In August 2019, the Planning Inspectorate advised that the plan be withdrawn from examination after finding that "fundamental aspects of the plan" were not sound, and that the current Strategic Development Locations and the overall spatial strategy were said by inspectors Malcolm Rivett and Steven Lee not to be "robust, consistent and objective".

== Locations ==
Twelve strategic development locations had been identified as part of the plans for new homes as follows:

- North Keynsham - 1,500 homes and 50,000 m^{2} employment floor space
- A4 Bath Road, Brislington - 750 homes at the current A4 Park and Ride site, with this site being relocated
- Whitchurch - 2,500 homes, along with provision for Park and Ride and a new link road from the A37 to A4
- Backwell - 700 homes along with a new road to link to Nailsea and Backwell railway station
- Banwell Garden Village - 1,900 homes
- Churchill Garden Village - 2,675 homes
- Nailsea - 2,575 homes
- Buckover Garden Village - 3,000 homes
- Charfield - 1,200 homes along with a reopened Charfield railway station
- Coalpit Heath - 1,800 homes
- Thornbury - 500 homes and a new MetroBus route
- Yate - a minimum of 2,000 homes along with a new MetroBus route and park and ride facility.

== Criticism ==
=== North Somerset ===
The plan attracted criticism in regard to the locations presented, particularly in North Somerset. The proposal for thousands of homes in Churchill were rejected by existing residents, with Councillor John Crockford-Hawley stating that the plan would lead to houses being built "where nobody wants them". Concerns were raised by residents that "the council failed to adequately consult on planned garden villages they fear will destroy their way of life and decimate the landscape." The proposal for 700 new homes in Backwell have concerned residents who believe the village would be "decimated" by the development.

=== Bath & North East Somerset ===
Residents of Whitchurch also voiced concerns over the extra homes planned for the area, along with the new proposed link road.

=== South Gloucestershire ===
The Buckover Garden Village proposal attracted significant criticism, with constraints on the transport network noted as an argument against the development.
