= Parson Street railway station =

Railway station in Bristol, England

Parson Street
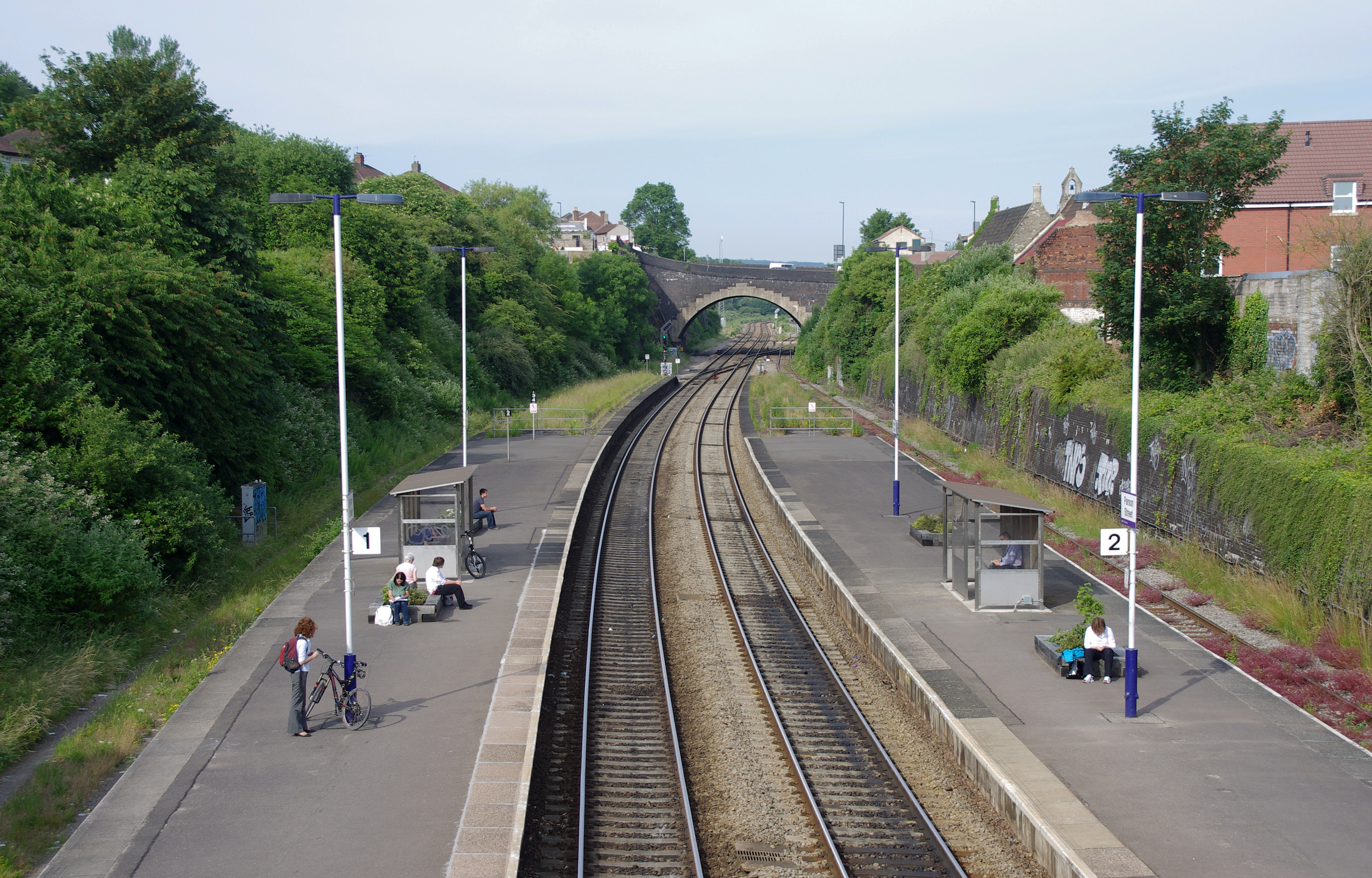

General information
- Location: Bedminster, Bristol; England
- Coordinates: 51.4332°N 2.6086°W
- Grid reference: ST578706
- Manager: Great Western Railway
- Platforms: 2 in use

Other information
- Station code: PSN
- Classification: DfT category F2

History
- Original company: Great Western Railway

Key dates
- 29 August 1927: Opened as Parson Street Platform (Note: Sources are inconsistent about the name of the station – Oakley's book on Bristol railway stations says the station was called Parson Street Platform, while both Butt's directory and the work of Mitchell and Smith state it was Parson Street Halt.)
- 21 May 1933: Rebuilt with four tracks

Passengers
- 2021/22: ▲0.101 million
- 2022/23: ▲0.157 million
- 2023/24: ▲0.178 million
- 2024/25: ▲0.204 million
- 2025/26: ▲0.228 million
Location
Notes
- Passenger statistics from the Office of Rail and Road

Parson Street railway station serves the western end of Bedminster in Bristol, England. It also serves other surrounding suburbs including Bishopsworth, Ashton Vale and Ashton Gate, along with Bristol City FC. It is 2 miles (3.2 km) from Bristol Temple Meads, and 120 miles (193 km) from London Paddington. Its three letter station code is PSN. It was opened in 1927 by the Great Western Railway, and was rebuilt in 1933. The station, which has two through-lines and two platforms, plus one freight line for traffic on the Portishead Branch Line, has minimal facilities. The station is managed by Great Western Railway, which provides all train services at the station, mainly an hourly service between Bristol Parkway and Weston-super-Mare.

== History ==
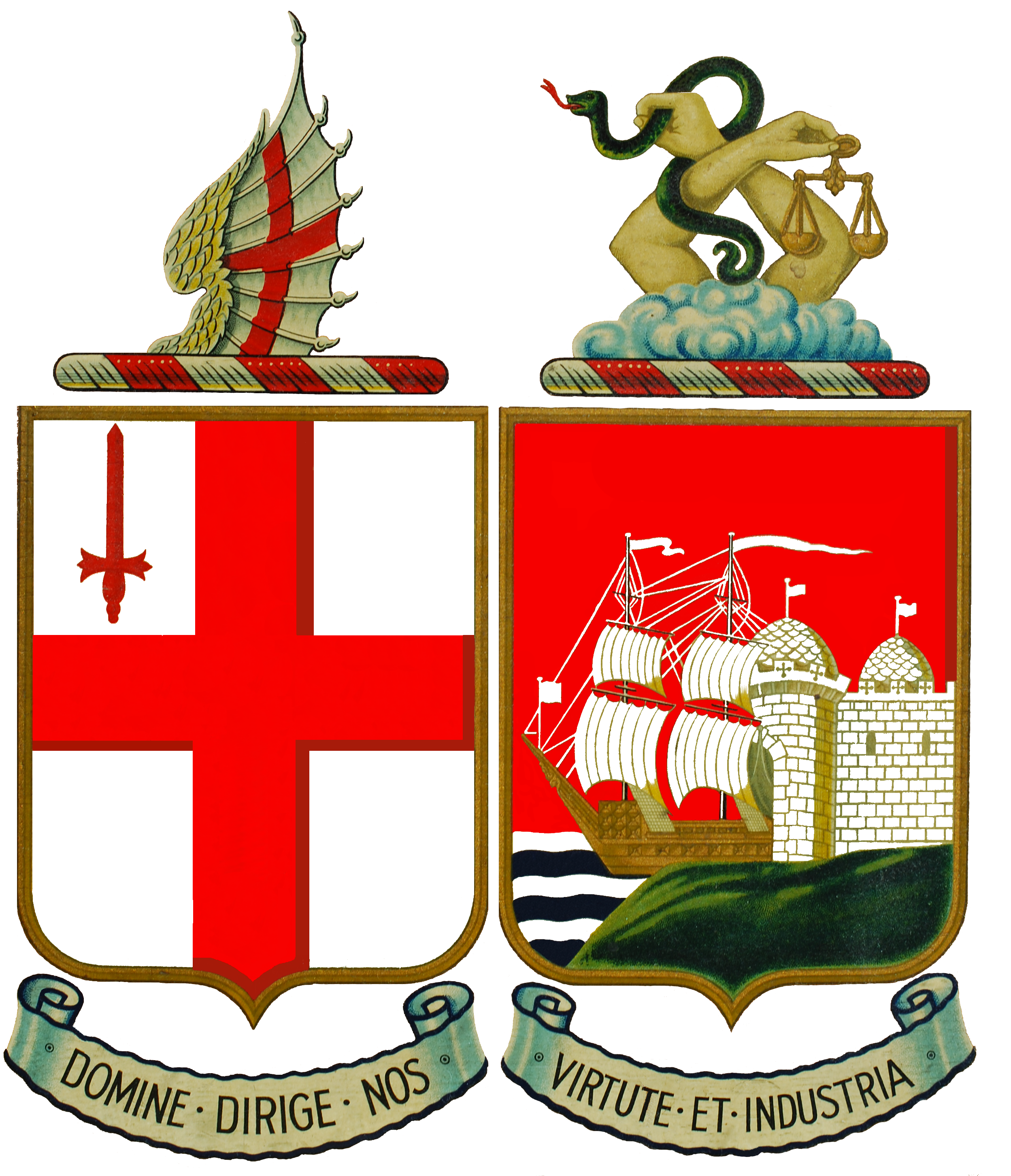
The Great Western Railway opened Parson Street railway station in 1927.

The first section of the Bristol and Exeter Railway's main line opened on 14 June 1841 between Bristol and Bridgwater. Engineered by Isambard Kingdom Brunel, the line was originally built as 7 ft (2,134 mm) broad-gauge, but had been reconstructed as a mixed gauge line to accommodate local 4 ft 8 1/2 in (1,435 mm)-gauge traffic by 1 June 1875. Broad gauge trains ceased operation on 20 May 1892. The Portishead Branch Line, which diverged from the Bristol to Exeter line at Parson Street Junction, (Note: The junction between the Bristol to Exeter line and Portishead Railway was known as Portishead Junction until 1932, after which it was known as Parson Street Junction.) the other side of a road bridge west of where the station would be built, had opened on 12 July 1867. It was only in 1871, with the opening of a station at Bedminster that there was a stop between the junction and Bristol Temple Meads.

As Bristol expanded in the early 20th century, the need for a new station to serve the outskirts grew, and on 29 August 1927, the Great Western Railway opened a station at Parson Street, named Parson Street Halt. There were two platforms, one on each side of the two running lines. There was a wooden shelter on the westbound platform, and a metal shelter on the eastbound platform. The platforms were made of wood, with access from the main road via steps. No goods facilities were provided.

The station was rebuilt in the early 1930s to cope with the relaying of the line west from Temple Meads with four tracks instead of two. Considerable engineering works were needed to cope with the widening of the station, including the removal of a short tunnel to the west of the station. The two new island platforms opened on 21 May 1933, and the station name was changed to simply Parson Street in November 1933. The new station included covered waiting shelters, and a booking office on the road bridge. Again, no goods facilities were provided.

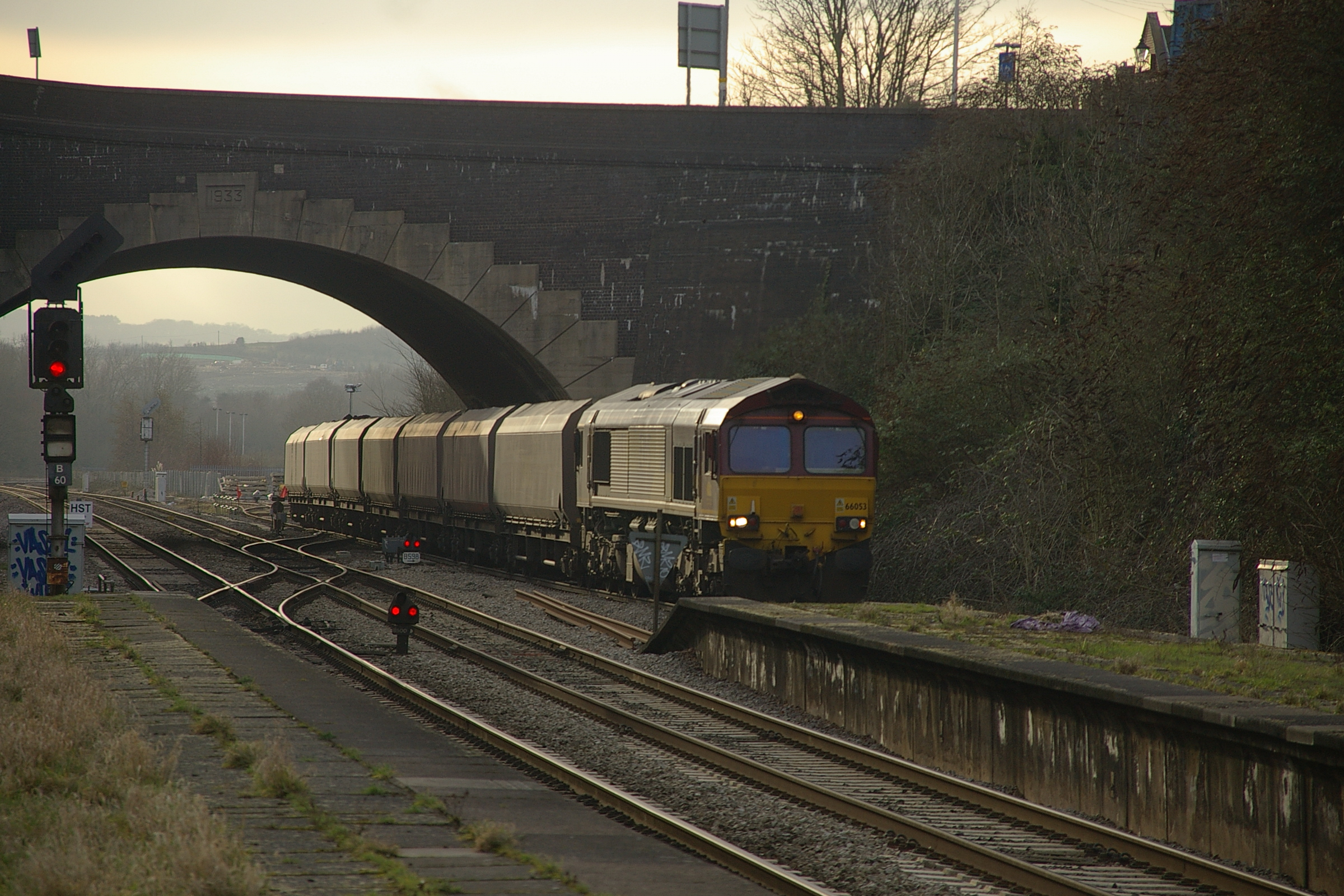
A DB Schenker Class 66 hauls a coal train through Parson Street, having just left the Portishead Branch Line. Freight trains from Royal Portbury Docks are not an uncommon sight at Parson Street.

Parson Street railway station served a dual purpose: as well as serving local suburban developments for commuter and excursion traffic, it also acted as a minor interchange for passengers on the Portishead Branch Line. When Parson Street opened in 1927, there were 21 services each weekday along the branch, operated by the Great Western Railway at half-hour intervals from Temple Meads. There were 8 trains on Sundays.

Following the Second World War, service levels dropped dramatically along the Portishead branch. When the railways were nationalised in 1948, services at Parson Street came under the auspices of the Western Region of British Railways, and by the time the branch was closed to passengers in 1964, there were only six trains each weekday, and none on Sundays. With the closure of the branch, Parson Street lost its interchange status, and in January 1971 the station buildings were demolished. Some special services did continue along the branch to Ashton Gate, carrying fans to Bristol City FC games at the nearby Ashton Gate Stadium. These ceased in 1977, and Parson Street became the arrival and departure point for these trains.

The Bristol Area Resignalling Scheme in the 1970s saw the Down Relief line, the most southern of the four running lines, converted to a siding linking Malago Vale carriage sidings to the east with the West Depot carriage sidings to the west. At the same time, Parson Street Junction was reworked, requiring trains to first cross from the Down Main line to the Up Main line before they were able to access the Portishead Branch. The Down Relief line was removed altogether when West Depot closed sometime after the opening of a new depot at St Philips Marsh to service High Speed Trains.

British Rail was split into business-led sectors in the 1980s, at which time operations at Bedminster passed to Regional Railways. Local services were franchised to Wales & West when the railway was privatised in 1997, which was in turn succeeded by Wessex Trains in 2001. The Wessex franchise was amalgamated with the Great Western franchise into the Greater Western franchise from 2006, and responsibility passed to First Great Western. The franchise was rebranded Great Western Railway in 2015.

In recent years, there has been a marked increase in passengers travelling to and from Parson Street. In the 2002/03 financial year, less than 4,000 passengers used the station; and in 2005, only six eastbound and eight westbound trains called at Parson Street each day, with 14,293 passengers using the station during the 2005/06 financial year. Since then, service levels have increased to 21 westbound trains and 18 eastbound per weekday, and passenger levels have more than quadrupled, to 102,654 in 2013/14. (Note: Annual estimated passenger usage based on sales of tickets in stated financial year(s) which end or originate at Parson Street from Office of Rail and Road statistics. Methodology may vary year on year.)

The campaign group Friends of Suburban Bristol Railways held a celebration in 2009 to mark the increase in passenger numbers. They were joined by pupils from Parson Street Primary School who had provided artwork to brighten up the station. This was done as part of the Severnside Schools Community Stations Programme, organised by the Severnside Community Rail Partnership. The Severnside CRP also installed plant displays in 2008, and in 2011 distributed leaflets advertising train services to local residents, in association with Bristol City Council and Passenger Focus. In January 2017 a group called Friends of Parson Street Railway Station was formed to lobby for improvements to facilities and services at the station.

In 2000/01, the track towards Portishead were relaid to allow rail access to Royal Portbury Docks. In 2010, another section of track was reinstated to allow the reopening of South Liberty Lane depot to handle Trans Ocean's wine import business, reducing road traffic. Seven trains terminate at the depot every week. The depot had closed in 1990 due to lack of demand for its facilities.

Preceding station	Historical railways	Following station
Bedminster	Great Western Railway; Bristol to Exeter line (1927–1941)	Long Ashton; Line open, station closed.
Bedminster	Great Western Railway; Bristol to Exeter line (1941–1948)	Flax Bourton; Line open, station closed.
Bedminster	Western Region of British Railways; Bristol to Exeter line (1948–1963)	Flax Bourton; Line open, station closed.
Bedminster	Western Region of British Railways; Bristol to Exeter line (1963–1982)	Nailsea & Backwell
Bedminster	Regional Railways; Bristol to Exeter line (1982–1997)	Nailsea & Backwell
Bedminster	Wales & West; Bristol to Exeter line (1997–2001)	Nailsea & Backwell
Bedminster	Wessex Trains; Bristol to Exeter line (2001–2006)	Nailsea & Backwell
Bedminster	Great Western Railway; Portishead Branch Line (1927–1948)	Ashton Gate; Line open, station closed.
Bedminster	Western Region of British Railways; Portishead Branch Line (1948–1964)	Ashton Gate; Line open, station closed.

== Description ==
The station is built in a cutting in the western end of Bedminster, on the Bristol to Exeter line 120 miles 16 chains (193.44 km) from London Paddington and 1 mile 65 chains (2.92 km) from Bristol Temple Meads. (Note: Railways in the United Kingdom are, for historical reasons, measured in miles and chains. There are 80 chains to the mile.) It is the second station along the line from Bristol Temple Meads. The surrounding area is mostly residential, with some industrial buildings to the north-east. There are two island platforms, each 210 yards (190 m) long, but only the first 100 yards (91 m) are in use, the rest fenced off. The platforms are on an alignment of roughly 60 degrees, with a slight curve. The southern island's northern face, platform 1, is for westbound trains; and the southern face of the northern island, platform 2, is for eastbound trains. The track on the southern side of the southern island has been removed, while the track to the northern side of the northern island is only accessible to trains to or from the Portishead Branch Line and Liberty Lane Freightliner terminal – no passenger trains use this. The speed limit through the station is 90 miles per hour (140 km/h) on the main lines and 25 miles per hour (40 km/h) on the freight line.

The station is surrounded on all sides by the A38 road, which splits the carriageways at this point, with the station in between. The line runs under the road at both ends of the station. Access between the platforms is via steps to the A38 at the east end of the platforms. There is no disabled access.

Facilities at the station are minimal – there is a metal and glass shelter on each of the two islands as well as on the bridge. The station is completely unstaffed, but there is a ticket machine. There are customer help points, giving next train information for both platforms. There is no car park or taxi rank, nor is there any cycle storage available. There are several bus stops nearby.

Just to the west of the station is Parson Street Junction, where the Portishead Branch diverges from the main line, heading north. The South Liberty Lane goods depot is adjacent to the junction, in the triangle between the main line, the Portishead Branch and the now-disused western connection between the branch and the main line.

== Services ==
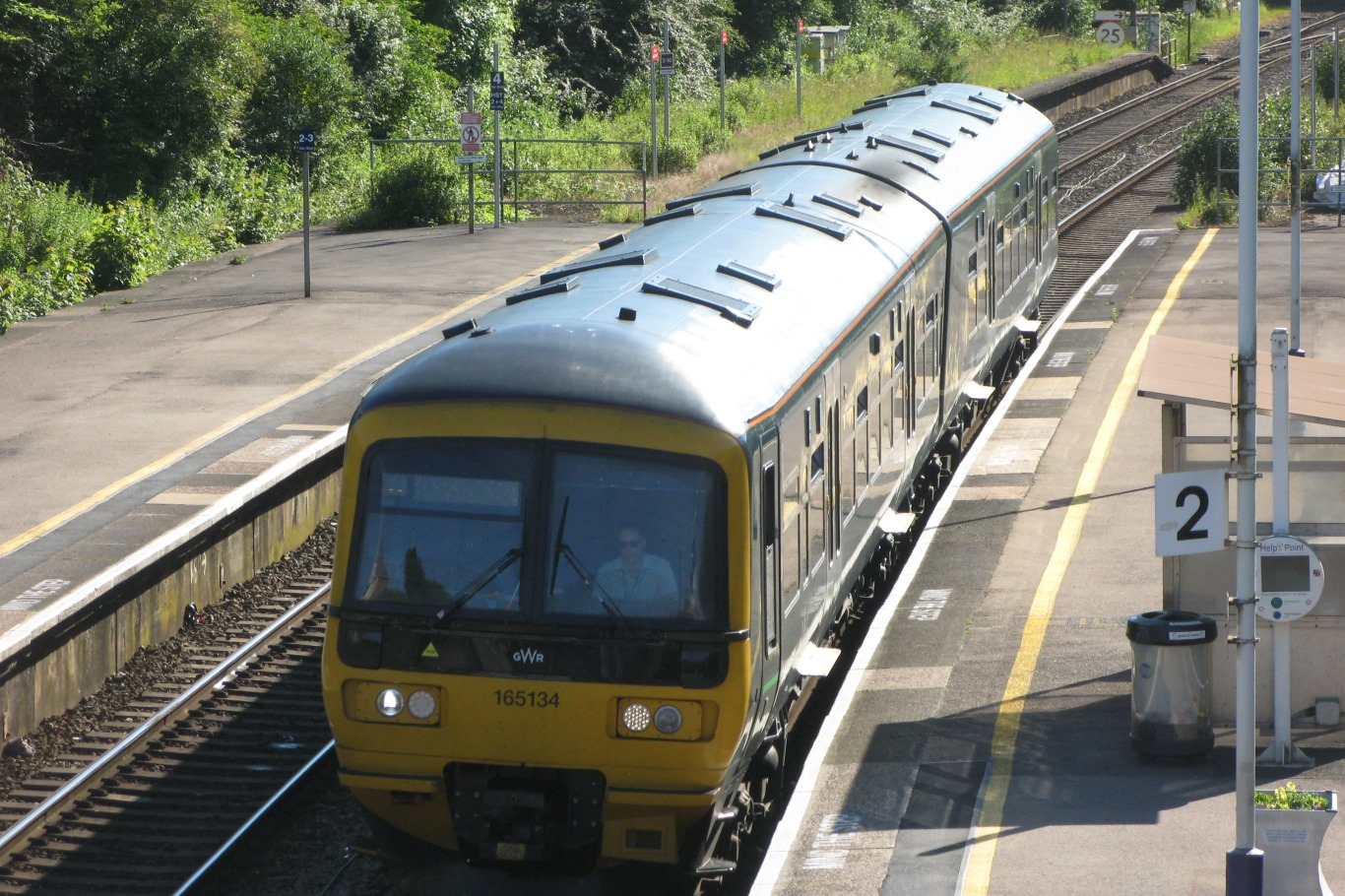
A Class 165 with a Bristol Parkway service at Parson Street

The station is managed by Great Western Railway, who also operate all rail services from the station. As of the December 2025-May 2026 timetable, the basic service from Monday to Friday consists of one train per hour in each direction, between Bristol Temple Meads and Weston-super-Mare, calling at all stations. Some trains working between Cardiff and Taunton or Exeter St Davids call at peak hours and in the evening. All trains at Parson Street also stop at Nailsea & Backwell westbound and Bedminster eastbound. On Saturday and Sunday, there is a similar pattern, but with no services beyond Bristol Parkway or Weston-super-Mare except during the early morning and late evening.

Services are mostly formed by Class 165 or and 166 diesel multiple-unit trains. CrossCountry services between Scotland and the South West pass non-stop throughout the day, with Great Western Railway services between London Paddington and Weston-super-Mare passing through during the morning and evening peaks.

The typical journey time to Bristol Temple Meads is 7 minutes, while to Weston-super-Mare takes 31 minutes.

Preceding station	National Rail	Following station
Bedminster	Great Western Railway (Severn Beach - Weston-super-Mare)	Nailsea and Backwell

The adjacent bus stop is served by the First West of England number 76 bus, between Hengrove and Henbury.

== Future ==
Parson Street is on the Weston-super-Mare/Yate corridor, one of the main axes of MetroWest, a rail transport plan which aims to enhance transport capacity in the Bristol area. As part of this scheme, the Portishead Branch Line, which runs along the south side of the River Avon from a junction just beyond Parson Street, will be reopened. The line was built in the 1860s, but closed to passenger traffic in 1964, leaving Portishead as one of Britain's largest towns without a railway station. The line was reopened for freight traffic to serve Royal Portbury Docks in 2002. The scheme was given the go-ahead in July 2012 as part of the City Deal, whereby local councils would be given greater control over money by the government. A consultation on the plans was held between 22 June and 3 August 2015 to gather views from the community and stakeholders before moving on to detailed designs. The detailed proposals will be subject to a second consultation before the plans are finalised. Due to the additional capital costs, the line will not be electrified, however the design will include passive provision for future electrification. Trains along the reopened line will operate between Portishead and Bristol Temple Meads, with two trains per hour in each direction. Services would call at Pill and Parson Street, with aspirations to also call at Bedminster and a reopened Ashton Gate. Trains could also be extended on to the Severn Beach Line. The line will be operated as part of the Greater Western passenger franchise.

The Down Relief line between Bristol Temple Meads and Parson Street is to be partially reinstated as part of the MetroWest scheme in order to ease congestion. According to the Great Western Route Utilisation Strategy, in the December 2007 timetable period, the line through Parson Street was running at over 75% capacity in the morning peak between 8 and 9am. It was predicted that by 2019, trains working the line would be completely full during peak hours. While the three tracks could cope with traffic generated by the reopening of the Portishead Line, campaigners note it would leave little room for growth. Parson Street Junction will also be upgraded during the works.

Preceding station	Future services	Following station
Bedminster	Greater Western franchise Portishead Branch Line	Pill

== Incidents ==
There have been several railway incidents in the Parson Street area over the years. On 19 November 2002, a Wessex Trains diesel multiple unit suffered an axle problem near Parson Street while operating a westbound service, causing the line to be blocked for four hours. Delays all along the line to Taunton have been caused by trackside cabling being stolen, affecting signalling between Nailsea & Backwell and Bedminster. Notable occurrences of this type happened in October 2006 and May 2012. Theft of personal property has also occurred on the station. In 2009, a gang of teenagers robbed a group of four 12- to 15-year-old boys of their bikes at Parson Street. The robbers followed their targets off the train, having got on at Weston-super-Mare, and attacked the boys as the train pulled away.

On 11 June 2019, a man in his 80s died after being struck by a train at Parson Street, delaying train services between Bristol Temple Meads and Worle. The British Transport Police subsequently treated the death as non-suspicious. Another person was struck by a train and killed at Parson Street in an unrelated incident on 26 August 2019; this was also treated by police as non-suspicious.

== See also ==
- Public transport in Bristol
