= Bristol–Exeter line =

Railway line in England

Bristol to Exeter line
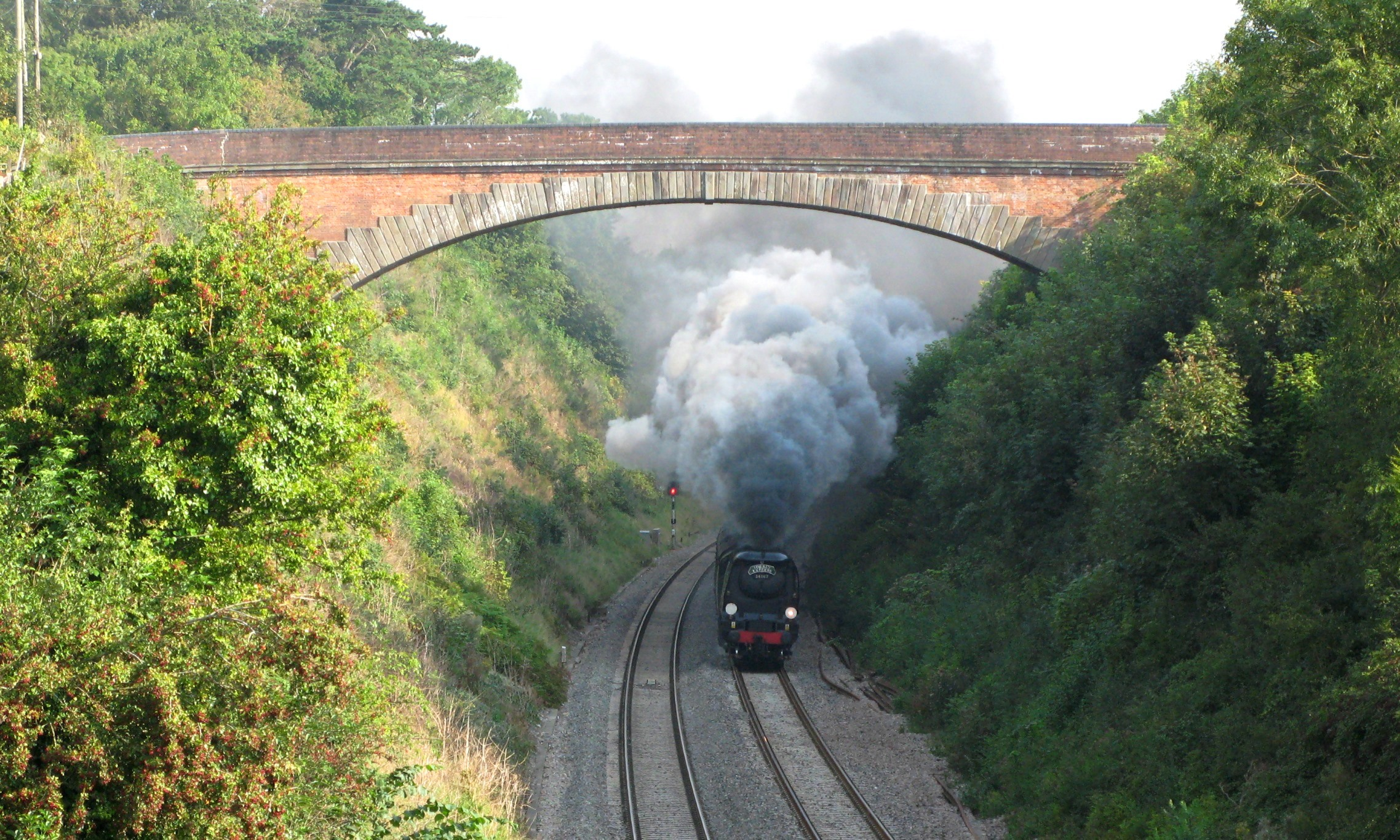
- 34067 Tangmere steaming under Devil's Bridge with a Torbay Express service

Overview
- Status: Operational
- Owner: Network Rail
- Termini: Bristol Temple Meads; Exeter St Davids

Service
- Type: Suburban rail, Heavy rail
- System: National Rail
- Operator(s): Great Western Railway, CrossCountry
- Rolling stock: Classes 165, 166, 158, 220/221 and 800/802

History
- Opened: 1841–1842

Technical
- Line length: 75 mi 41 ch (121.5 km)
- Number of tracks: 2
- Track gauge: 4 ft 8 1/2 in (1,435 mm) standard gauge
- Operating speed: 110 mph (177 km/h) maximum
Route map
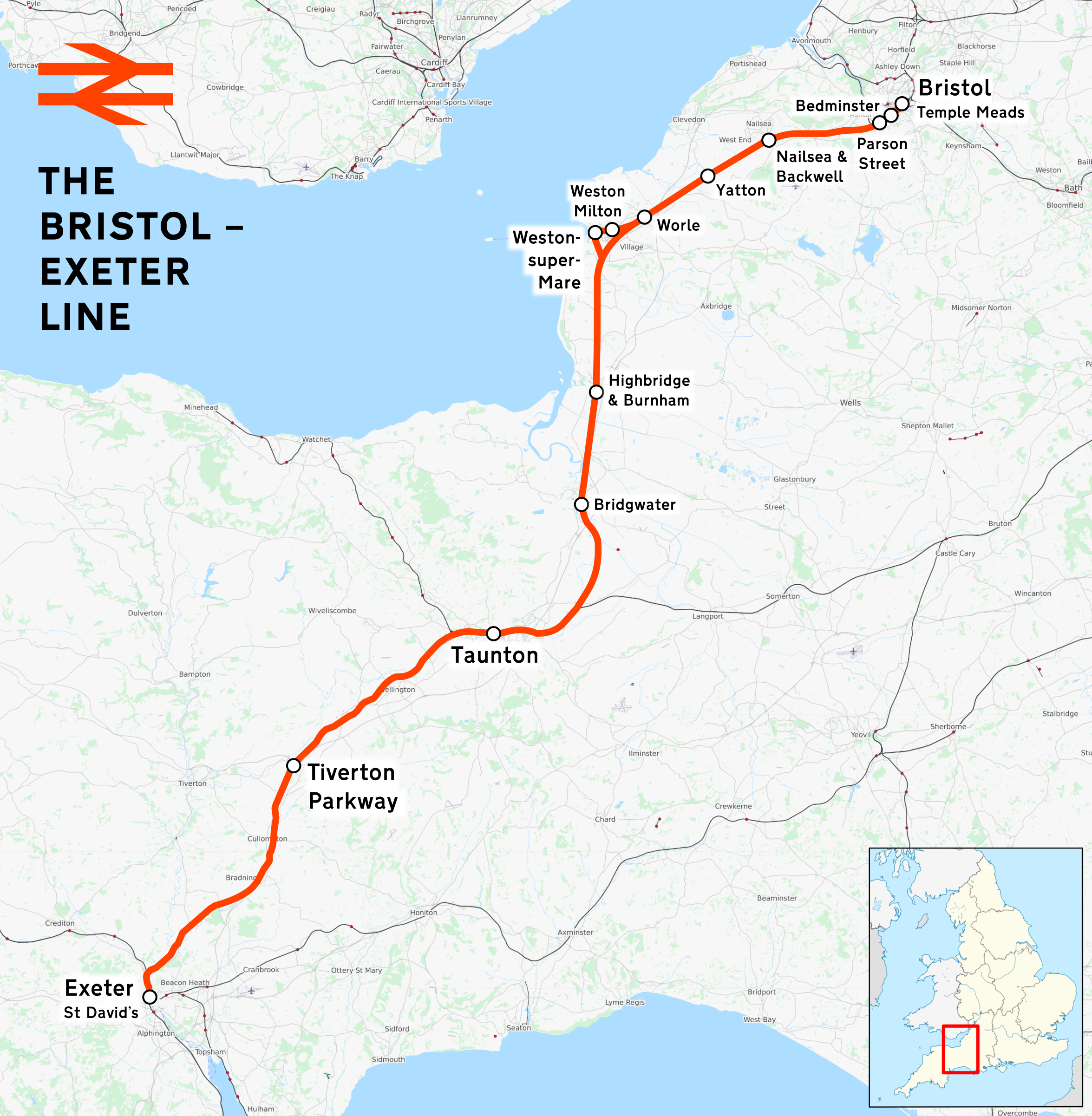
(Click to expand)

The Bristol to Exeter line is a major branch of the Great Western Main Line in the West of England and runs from Bristol, to Exeter, from where it continues as the Exeter to Plymouth line. It was one of the principal routes of the pre-1948 Great Western Railway which were subsequently taken over by the Western Region of British Railways and are now part of the Network Rail system.

== History ==
The line was built by the Bristol and Exeter Railway with Isambard Kingdom Brunel as the engineer. The section from Bristol to Bridgwater was opened on 14 June 1841 and it was completed to Taunton on 1 July 1842. It was initially operated by the Great Western Railway (GWR) as an extension of their line from London Paddington and formed part of the 7 ft (2,134 mm) broad gauge trunk route to Penzance on which through trains were run from 1867, but in the same year the section between Highbridge and Durston was reconstructed as a mixed gauge line to accommodate local 4 ft 8 1/2 in (1,435 mm) gauge traffic. The remainder of the line was laid with mixed gauge by 1 June 1875 and broad gauge trains ceased operation on 20 May 1892.

The Bristol and Exeter Railway took over its own operations from 1 May 1849 but amalgamated with the GWR on 1 January 1876.

On 1 July 1906 the Langport and Castle Cary Railway line was opened which enabled London to Taunton trains to run on a shorter route instead of the "Great Way Round" through Bristol.

The Great Western Railway was nationalised on 1 January 1948 into the Western Region of British Railways.

In 1977 the Parliamentary Select Committee on Nationalised Industries recommended considering electrification of more of Britain's rail network, and by 1979 BR presented a range of options to do so by 2000. Some included electrifying the Bristol to Exeter line, Exeter to Plymouth Line, Riviera Line and Cornish Main Line. Under the 1979–90 Conservative governments that succeeded the 1976–79 Labour government the proposal was not implemented. At present, there are no plans to electrify the line or any other lines mentioned, although locals are campaigning for electrification of the line from Bristol to Weston-Super-Mare.

The Bristol to Taunton Line is now part of Route 13 of the Network Rail system.

== Route ==
=== Bristol to Weston-super-Mare ===
Communities served: Bristol (including the suburb of Bedminster) – Nailsea and Backwell – Yatton – Weston-super-Mare (including the suburb of Worle)

On leaving Bristol Temple Meads the line passes through suburban Bedminster and Parson Street railway stations. This section of the route has three tracks and, as far as Bedminster, the centre track is reversible to give some flexibility for regulating trains in the Temple Meads area. After passing through a short, deep cutting at Parson Street, the Portbury branch line diverges on the right.

The line climbs westwards up past Long Ashton village and under the A370 road to enter a cutting with Flax Bourton tunnel at the summit. The remains of Flax Bourton railway station are near the tunnel. The line descends to Nailsea and Backwell railway station, which is on a road bridge between Backwell on the left and Nailsea over the low hill on the right. It then continues past the isolated church at Chelvey (left) to Yatton railway station. This was once a busy junction station with branches to Clevedon (right) and Wells (left); the latter is now a footpath and cycleway as far as Cheddar.

Beyond Yatton the line runs across the low-lying North Marsh with level crossings at Hewish and Puxton and Worle, where an old signal box is retained to supervise the two level crossings. The line passes beneath the M5 motorway approaching Puxton and then comes to Worle railway station on the outskirts of Weston-super-Mare. A short distance beyond the station is Worle Junction where a single-track branch diverges to the right to serve Weston Milton and Weston-super-Mare railway stations. There is a crossing loop at Weston-super-Mare, beyond which the single track continues to rejoin the main line at Uphill Junction.

=== Weston-super-Mare to Taunton ===
Communities served: Weston-super-Mare – Highbridge and Burnham-on-Sea – Bridgwater – Taunton

The line has now swung round to head south. At Uphill there is a short, deep cutting crossed by a high brick bridge built by Brunel, known locally as "Devil's Bridge". The bridge is Grade II listed. Beyond this lie the remains of Bleadon and Uphill railway station (right). Passing across the Somerset Levels the line comes to the site of Brent Knoll railway station with the isolated hill that it was named for close by on the left. The next open station is Highbridge and Burnham; this is in Highbridge but also serves co-joined Burnham-on-Sea. The Somerset and Dorset Joint Railway used to cross the line on the level just north of the station; their locomotive works were on the site of the industrial units visible to the left as the line passes through the station.

More level ground brings the line to Bridgwater where the goods yard is used for waste traffic from Hinkley Point B Nuclear Power Station. Beyond the station, on the right, used to be the carriage works of the Bristol and Exeter Railway but the site is now lost beneath modern industrial units. The line now crosses over the River Parrett on the Somerset Bridge and then passes below the M5 again.

The Bridgwater and Taunton Canal now joins on the right for most of the way to Taunton. At Durston the former Yeovil branch line joins from the left. A short cutting brings the line to Cogload Junction; the line towards Taunton climbs up here and crosses above the Reading to Taunton Line which it then joins to complete the journey to Taunton, passing Creech St Michael and the former junction of the Chard branch line on the left. The final run into Taunton sees the River Tone appear alongside on left and the canal passes beneath the line to join the river at Firepool, behind the site of the former goods yard on the same side.

=== Taunton to Exeter ===
Communities served: Taunton – Tiverton and Willand – Exeter

The line leaves Taunton and passes the engineer's depot at Fairwater Yard on the same side. The former Norton Fitzwarren railway station is the location of two serious collisions and a fatal train fire. The West Somerset Railway diverges on the right and work is under way to provide new facilities here for this heritage railway which includes relaying track for a short distance along the old Devon and Somerset Railway that formed a third route in between the main line and the West Somerset. On the left of the line an embankment marks the remains of the Grand Western Canal.

After passing over Victory Crossing at Bradford-on-Tone, the line starts to climb upwards. It passes through the remains of Wellington station and then under the A38 road at Beambridge, which was the site of the line's terminus while work was underway to excavate the Whiteball Tunnel at the top of Wellington Bank. It was coming down here that City of Truro became the first locomotive to exceed 100 miles per hour (160 km/h).

Through the tunnel and into Devon, the M5 motorway comes alongside on the left and the line arrives at Tiverton Parkway, the railhead for much of north Devon via the A361 road that joins the motorway next to the station. A short distance further is Tiverton Loops, the site of the former Tiverton Junction railway station.

The motorway service station on the left marks the site of Cullompton railway station, and then the line passes the remains of Hele and Bradninch and Silverton stations. At Stoke Canon the old Exe Valley Railway used to join from the right, and then the railway sweeps through the valley of the River Culm to where it joins the River Exe near Cowley Bridge Junction. Here the Tarka Line from Barnstaple joins on the right and the line then passes (on the same side) Riverside Yard and an old transhipment shed. Until 20 May 1892, when the then GWR lines were converted from the 7 ft (2,134 mm) broad gauge, the shed was used to transfer goods between broad gauge wagons and the 4 ft 8 1/2 in (1,435 mm) standard gauge wagons used by the London and South Western Railway to Yeovil and Barnstaple. Passing over the wide Red Cow level crossing, the line comes to Exeter St Davids railway station.

== Services ==
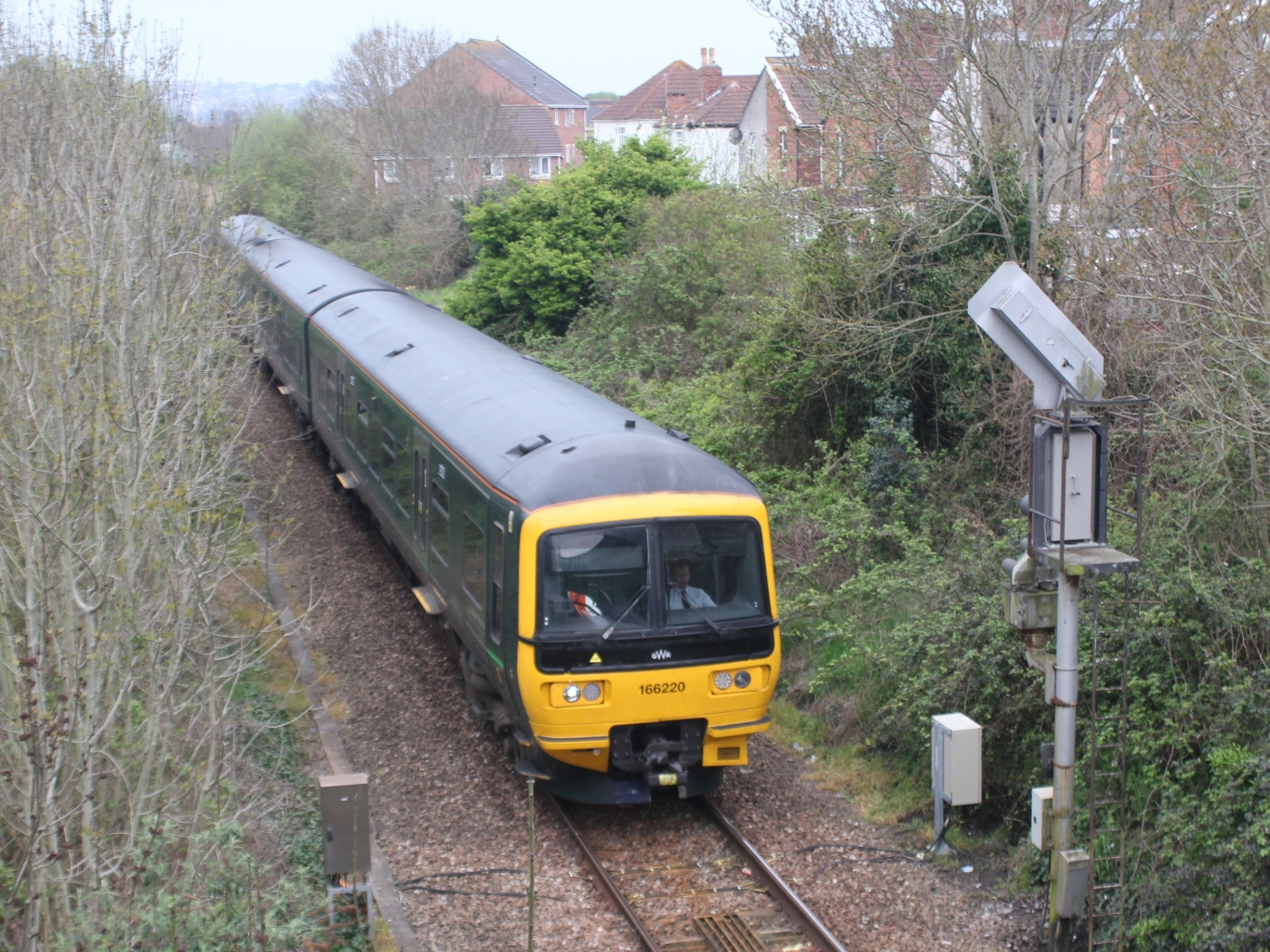
A Class 166 approaching Weston-super-Mare

All stations on the route are served by Great Western Railway. Local trains generally operate between Cardiff Central and Taunton (calling at all stations between Bristol Temple Meads and Taunton except Bedminster and Parson Street) and between Avonmouth/Severn Beach and Weston-super-Mare (calling at all stations from Temple Meads) combining to give a half-hourly service between Bristol Temple Meads and Weston-super-Mare throughout much of the day. Through trains running every two hours to and from London Paddington are also operated via Bristol to Weston-super-Mare (with limited extensions to Taunton), and direct from London via Westbury to Taunton and Exeter. Some services from Cardiff and many from London continue beyond Exeter towards Plymouth and Penzance. Local trains are mostly formed from a mix of Class 165 and 166 DMUs. London and Cardiff services are operated by Class 800 and 802 trains.

The other operator on the route is CrossCountry, which provides trains between Scotland and north-east England and Paignton, Plymouth or Penzance. Trains are mostly formed of Class 220 and 221 units, working either singly or in pairs.

== Infrastructure ==
The route has a line speed limit of 100 miles per hour (160 km/h) with local variations, the main one being the 110 mph from approx. Bleadon (138-44) to Huntspill (147-00); trains from Bristol to Taunton are described as travelling in the 'down' direction. It is constructed to Route Availability 8 and freight loading gauge W8. It has Multiple Aspect Signals (MAS) and Track Circuit Block (TCB) controlled from the panel signal box at Bristol. A local signal box at Puxton and Worle controls the two level crossings at Hewish and Puxton, and an emergency panel at Weston-super-Mare can take control of the section from Hewish to Uphill Junction if required.

The 21st Century modernisation of the Great Western Main Line has included electrification of the main line from London to Bristol Parkway however this is not planned to be extended onto the Bristol to Exeter line. Trains are now a hybrid of diesel and electric power (Bimodes) which can run on non electrified routes south of Bristol.

== Proposed changes ==
The Weston-super-Mare to Yate is one of the main axes of the proposed Greater Bristol Metro, which aims to enhance transport capacity in the Bristol area.

There have also been calls for a dedicated Bristol Airport Rail Link to serve Bristol Airport, branching off from the main line somewhere near Flax Bourton.

== See also ==
- Disused railway stations (Bristol to Exeter Line)
- Disused railway stations (Exeter to Plymouth Line)
- 21st-century modernisation of the Great Western Main Line

== Sources and further reading ==
- Avon County Planning Department (1983). Railways in Avon, a short history of their development and decline 1832 - 1982. Bristol: Avon County Planning Department. ISBN 0-860631-84-2.
- Beck, Keith; Copsey, John (1990). The Great Western in South Devon. Didcot: Wild Swan Publications. ISBN 0-906867-90-8.
- Central Publicity Unit (Winter 1979). Railway Electrification. British Railways Board. pp. 0–2, 8.
- Conolly, W. Philip (1967). British Railways Pre-grouping Atlas and Gazetteer. Shepperton: Ian Allan Publishing. ISBN 0-711003-20-3.
- Cooke, R.A. (1979). Section 16: West Somerset. Track Layout Diagrams of the GWR and BR WR. Harwell: R.A. Cooke. pp. not cited.
- Great Western Railway (1924). Number 1 — Paddington to Penzance. Through the Window. London: Great Western Railway. pp. not cited.
- Hesp, Martin (7 July 2008). "My magnificent rail journey". Western Morning News. Archived from the original on 25 November 2010.
