= Weston railway station =

Weston railway station may refer to:

Currently open stations:

- Weston GO Station, a GO Transit station in Toronto, Ontario, Canada
- Weston-super-Mare railway station, in Somerset, England
- Weston Milton railway station, in Somerset, England

Disused stations:

- Weston railway station (Lincolnshire), England
- Weston railway station (Bath), England
- Weston station (MBTA), Weston, Massachusetts, United States
