= St Georges, Somerset =

Village in Somerset, England

Coordinates: 51.3645°N 2.9002°W

St Georges
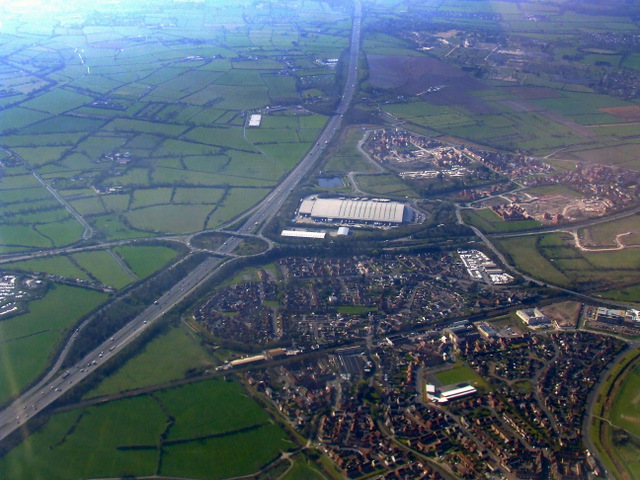
- St Georges from the air

- Location within Somerset
- Population: 3,379 (2011)
- OS grid reference: ST374632
- Unitary authority: North Somerset
- Ceremonial county: Somerset
- Region: South West
- Country: England
- Sovereign state: United Kingdom
- Post town: Weston-super-Mare
- Postcode district: BS22
- Dialling code: 01934
- Police: Avon and Somerset
- Fire: Avon
- Ambulance: South Western
- UK Parliament: Weston-super-Mare

St Georges is a civil parish and village in the unitary authority of North Somerset, England. Its population in the 2011 census was 3,379.

The parish is a 20th century creation, the area having previously been part of the parish of Banwell.

== Governance ==
The parish is in the ward of Banwell & Winscombe within the unitary authority of North Somerset which was created in 1996, as established by the Local Government Act 1992. It provides a single tier of local government with responsibility for almost all local government functions within their area. Fire, police, and ambulance services are provided jointly with other authorities through the Avon Fire and Rescue Service, Avon and Somerset Constabulary and the South Western Ambulance Service.

North Somerset's area covers part of the ceremonial county of Somerset but it is administered independently of the non-metropolitan county. Its administrative headquarters are in the town hall in Weston-super-Mare. Between 1 April 1974 and 1 April 1996, it was the Woodspring district of the county of Avon. Before 1974 the parish was part of the Axbridge Rural District.

The parish is represented in the House of Commons of the Parliament of the United Kingdom as part of the Weston-super-Mare county constituency. It elects one Member of Parliament (MP) by the first past the post system of election.

== Transport ==
The village is close to junction 21 of the M5 motorway.

A railway station at St Georges was opened by the Bristol and Exeter Railway on 14 June 1841. It was initially named Banwell, but was renamed Worle when a new Sandford and Banwell railway station was opened on the Cheddar Valley Railway on 3 August 1869. A Worle Station was opened on the new Weston Loop Line on 1 March 1884, after which the station was renamed Puxton. Following the closure of Worle, the station at St Georges became "Puxton and Worle" on 2 January 1922. It closed on 6 April 1964. The Worle railway station opened 24 September 1990 a short distance from the village.
