= Disused railway stations on the Bristol to Exeter Line =

English railway stations

There are 22 disused railway stations on the Bristol to Exeter line between Bristol Temple Meads and Exeter St Davids. The line was completed in 1844 at which time the temporary terminus at Beambridge was closed. The most recent closure was Tiverton Junction which was replaced by a new station on a different site in 1986. 12 of the disused stations have structures that can still be seen from passing trains.

== Background ==
The 75-mile (121 km) route was opened by the Bristol and Exeter Railway in stages between 1841 and 1844. In 1876 this company was amalgamated with the Great Western Railway which, in turn, was nationalised into British Railways in 1948. It is now owned by Network Rail.

Apart from the temporary station at Beam Bridge which was only used for a year, the earliest closures were in the Weston-super-Mare area in order to provide new facilities for the traffic to that town, which was much greater than predicted when the line was planned. The majority of the remaining closures followed Dr Beeching's Reshaping of British Railways report of 1963. The most recent closure was Tiverton Junction, which was replaced by a new station at Tiverton Parkway on a site closer to Junction 27 of the M5 motorway, where the North Devon Relief Road joins it.

13 stations remain open on the line today, but there have been proposals to reopen stations at Cullompton and Wellington.

== Stations ==
=== Bristol to Taunton ===
==== Long Ashton ====
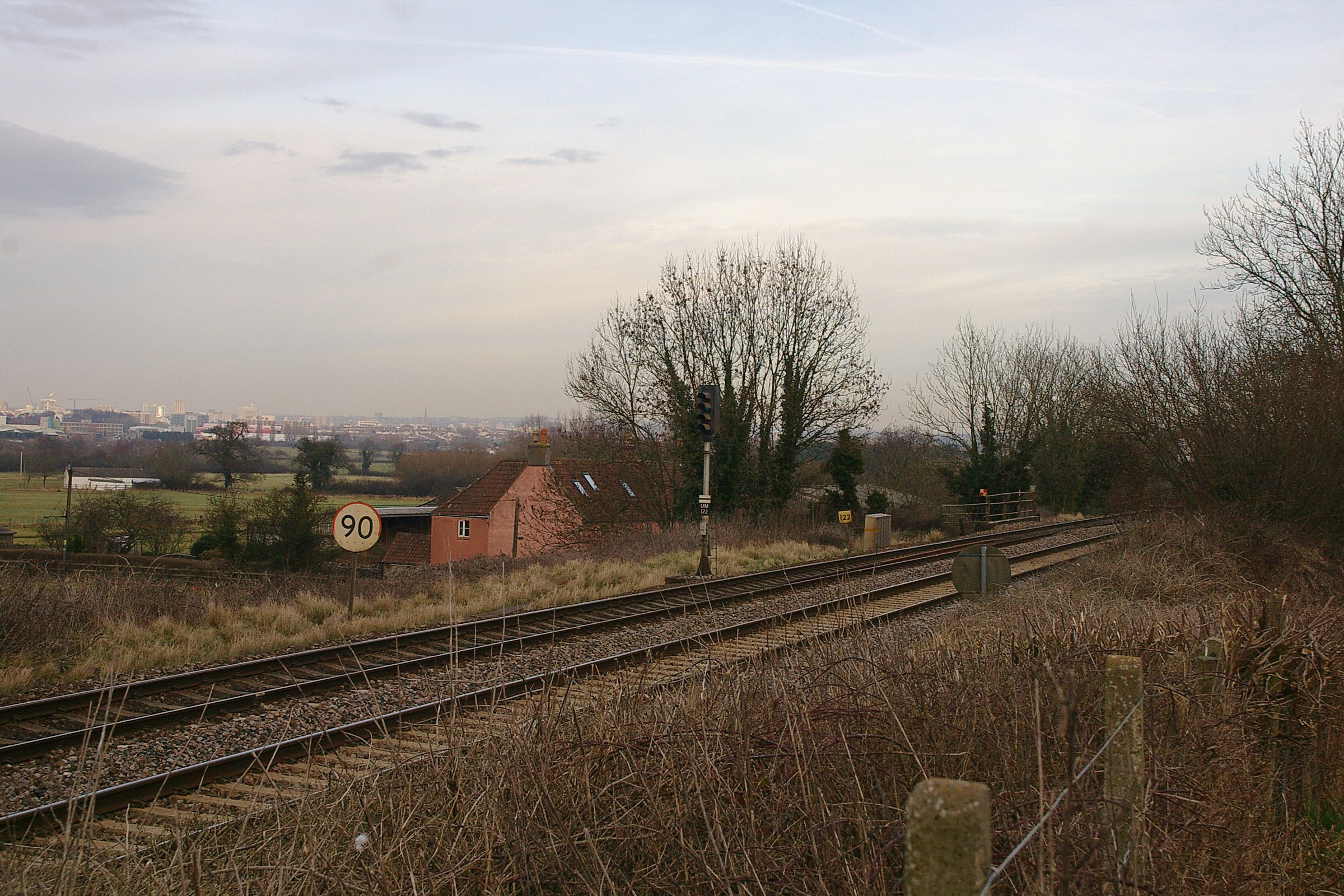
The site of Long Ashton station.

This station was situated on the climb from Bristol up to Flax Bourton Tunnel. It was in the valley below Long Ashton, at the place where today there is a flyover for the A370 road. It was opened by the Great Western Railway in 1926 Originally named Long Ashton Platform, the suffix was dropped on 23 September 1929, and the station was closed on 6 October 1941. There are no visible remains.

==== Flax Bourton ====
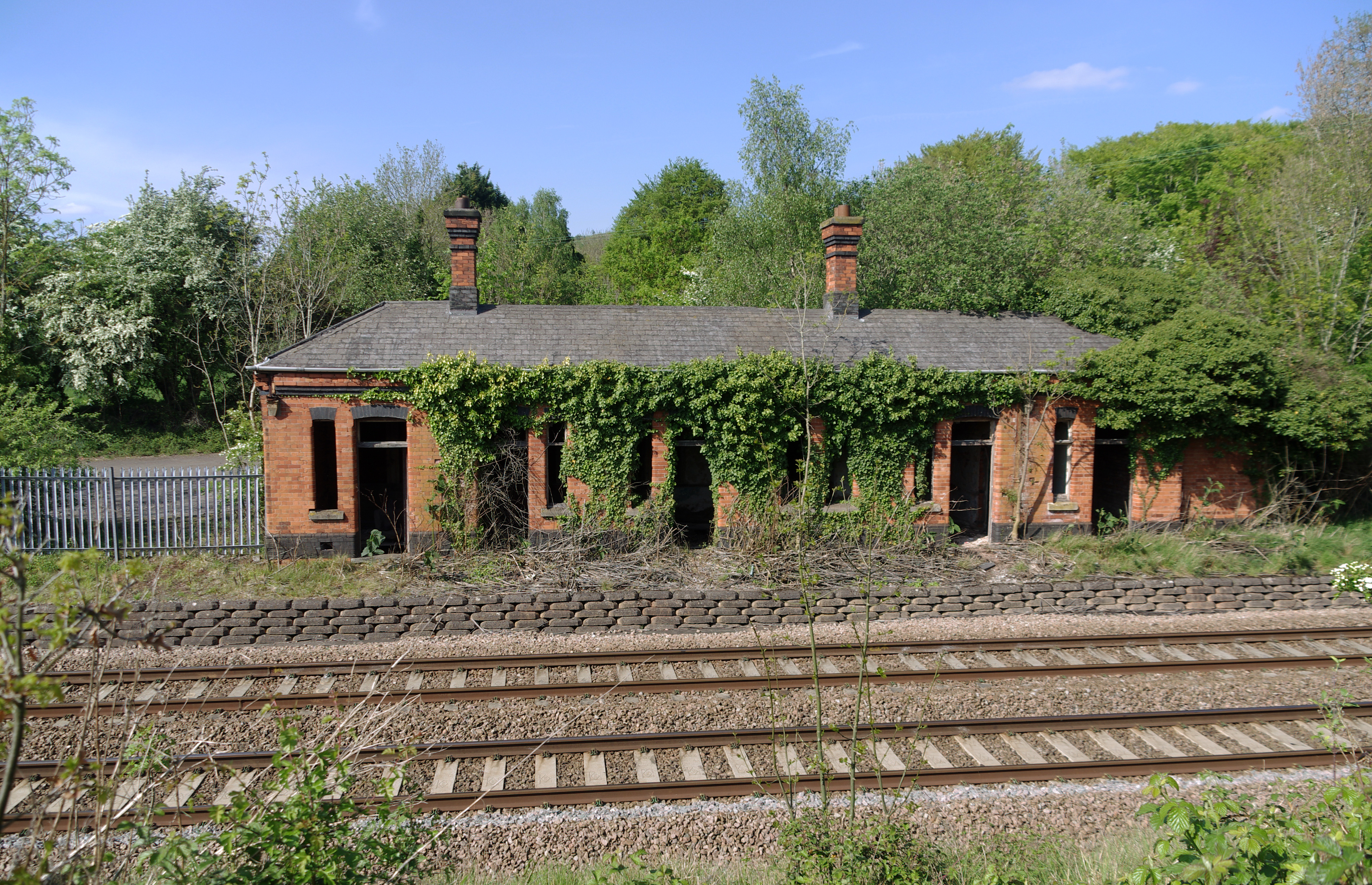
The main station building of 1893 at Flax Bourton as it stands today.

A station known as Bourton was opened in 1860 just west of the short tunnel at the summit of the climb from Bristol. It was renamed Flax Bourton on 1 September 1868. A house was provided for the station master on the road side above the cutting in which it was situated, a signal box and a couple of small buildings were on the platform.

A new station was built a little to the west of the original station and opened on 2 March 1893 with improved facilities. It was closed to passengers on 2 December 1963. It remained open for goods traffic until the end of the following July, after which a Ministry of Fuel and Power depot remained for another forty years or so, but even the connection to this has now been severed.

The house by the road still stands, as does a derelict goods lock-up on the up (eastbound) platform. Friends of Suburban Bristol Railways in their Autumn 2011 newsletter called for the reopening to be considered in the reletting of the Greater Western passenger franchise, and there are some suggestions that the station be used as a transfer point for passengers going to Bristol Airport.

The next station open southwards is Nailsea and Backwell.

==== Puxton ====
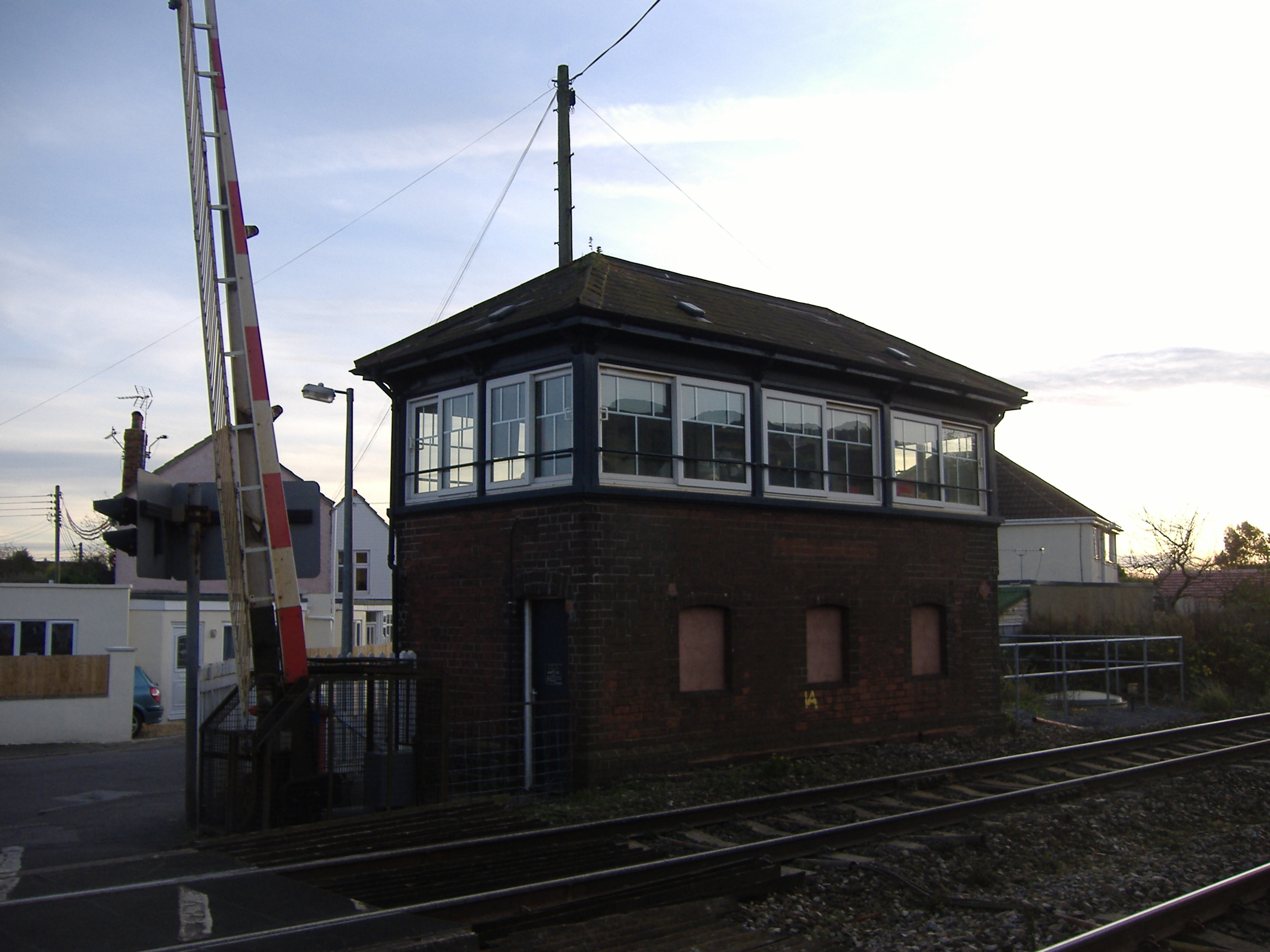
The Puxton station signal box has been retained to operate the level crossings here and at nearby Hewish.

This station (51.3623°N 2.8982°W) was opened with the railway on 14 June 1841 and was initially named "Banwell", even though that village was quite some distance from the line. In fact a Sandford and Banwell railway station was opened on 3 August 1869 on the Cheddar Valley Railway and so this one on the main line was renamed "Worle". The settlement of Worle was, however, better served by a new station on the Weston Loop line when it opened on 1 March 1884 and so the one on the main line was renamed again, now being called "Puxton". Worle station on the Loop was itself closed on 2 January 1922 and so the main line station was given yet another name, now "Puxton and Worle". Despite all these names, the station is actually in the small village of St Georges.

Puxton was a railhead for the milk trains of the London Co-operative Society, who built a creamery next to the station, which was served by its own private siding.

The station finally closed on 6 April 1964, although a new Worle railway station was opened a short distance to the west on 24 September 1990. The original station saw some traffic to temporary sidings in 1970–71 during the construction of the M5 Motorway. The platforms and station master's house can still be seen immediately east of Puxton level crossing, which is still controlled by a Great Western Railway-built signal box. A goods shed was demolished sometime between 2004 and 2008 to make way for new buildings. On the opposite side of the line is an old milk depot that was rail-connected from 1925 to 1966 but is now used by a business that repairs road goods vehicles.

The next open station southwards is at Worle.

==== Worle ====
This station (51.3523°N 2.9241°W), on the Weston Loop adjacent to Worle Junction, was opened with this new line on 1 March 1884. It closed on 2 January 1922 although the substantial stone building was not demolished until the 1960s and the platforms are still visible beneath the trees that have grown on the site.

==== Weston Junction ====
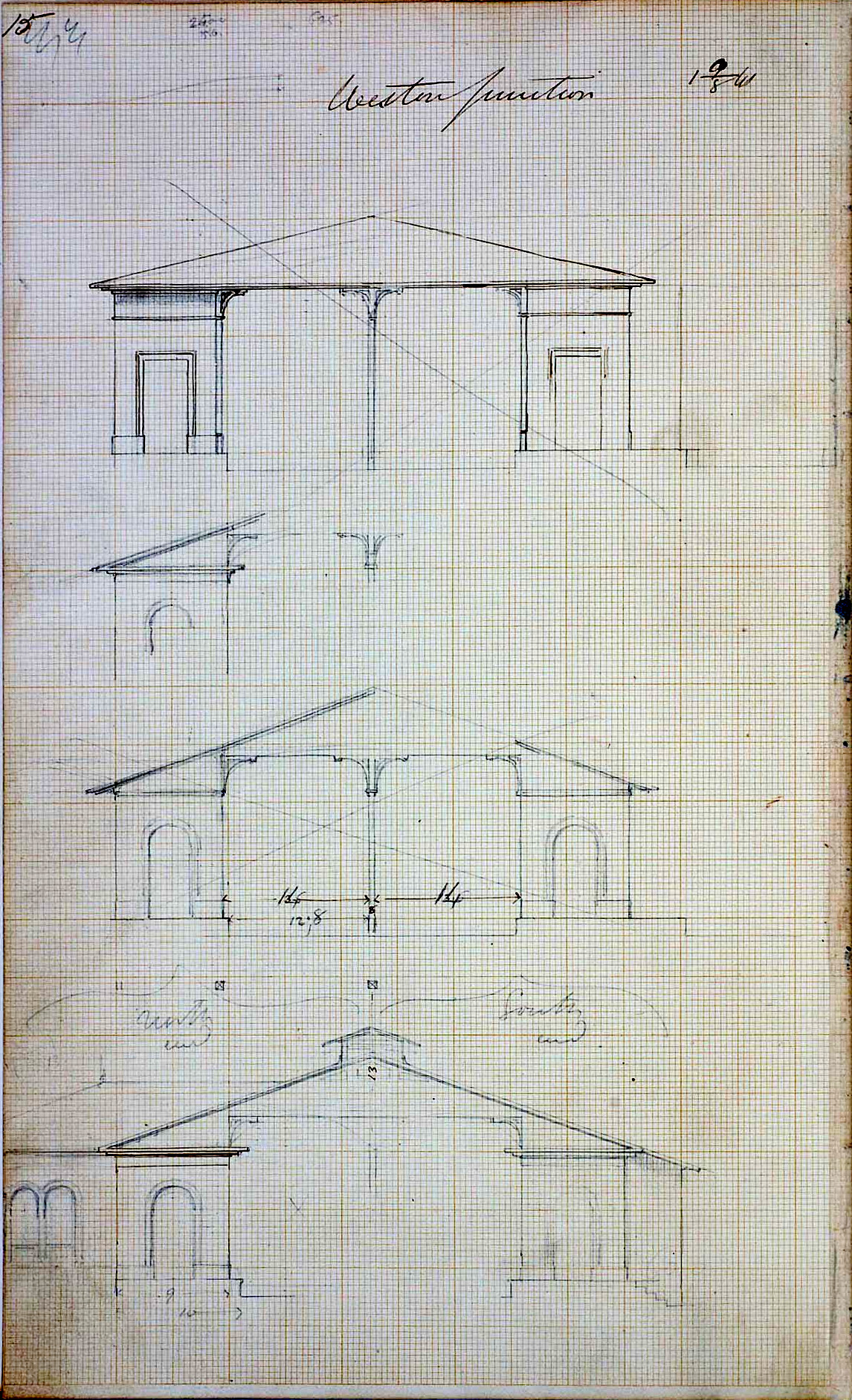
Drawings for Weston Junction Station, by Isambard Kingdom Brunel

This (51.3393°N 2.9480°W) was the junction of the branch to Weston, built on the moors 1½ miles from Weston-super-Mare. It served only for passengers changing trains until a booking office was opened in 1850.

The station was closed on 1 March 1884 when the new loop line to that town was opened, although the mail train continued to drop mail bags every night; for several years, these were collected by a trolley that ran on the old branch line. The staff cottages, which were built in 1870 alongside the approach road, can still be seen on the south side of the line.

==== Weston-super-Mare ====
The first Weston-super-Mare station was a terminus to a branch from Weston Junction. It was replaced by a second station, also a terminus and later known as Locking Road to distinguish it from the third (and current) station.

==== Bleadon and Uphill ====
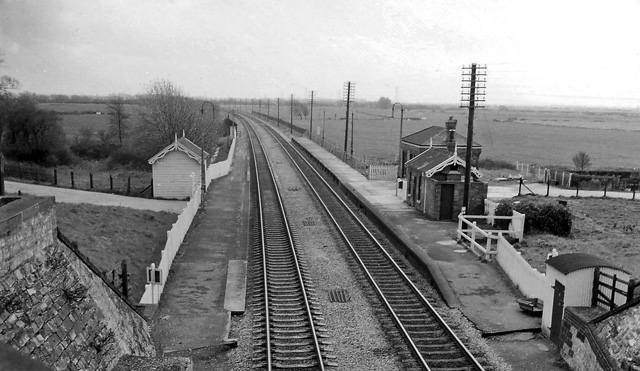
Bleadon & Uphill Station in 1963

A new station (51.3150°N 2.9687°W) was opened in 1871 at the south end of Uphill cutting, midway between that village (on the other side of the hill) and Bleadon. Originally called 'Uphill', it was renamed 'Bleadon and Uphill' in 1872. Uphill Junction, the southern end of the Weston Loop, was opened at the other end of the cutting in 1884.

The station was unstaffed from 2 November 1959 and finally closed on 5 October 1964. It then became the home of a small railway museum, the star exhibits being ex-Cardiff Railway 0-4-0ST 1338 and a British Railways railbus. The museum has since closed and the exhibits moved to other sites, but the platforms are still there as is the station master's house, albeit with a more modern extension.

==== Brean Road ====
This halt (51.2849°N 2.97042°W), at Lympsham on the road to Brean opened on 17 June 1929, closed 2 May 1955. It had wooden platforms.

==== Brent Knoll ====
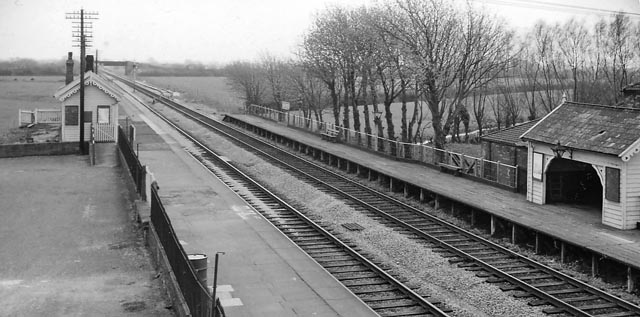
Brent Knoll Station in 1963

This station (51.2582°N 2.9703°W) opened in 1875 in the shadow of a large hill, Brent Knoll, to serve the village of Brent Knoll. The station was host to a GWR camp coach from 1938 to 1939.

It closed on 4 January 1971, although for many years the train service had been reduced to one train each per day. The brick-built station master's house can still be seen on the east side of the line.

The next station open southwards is Highbridge and Burnham.

==== Dunball ====
Dunball (51.1643°N 2.9834°W) is the location of a wharf on the River Parrett to the north of Bridgwater, and sidings were provided here at an early date, mainly to handle coal shipped across from Wales. A station was opened where the sidings joined the main line in 1873. The down (southbound) platform was situated opposite the sidings; the up platform was a little further south on the other bank of the King's Sedgemoor Drain, a man-made water course that drains the nearby moors. It also served the villages of Puriton and Pawlett.

The station was unstaffed from 6 November 1961 and was closed on 5 October 1964. There are no visible remains.

The next open station southwards is Bridgwater.

==== Durston ====
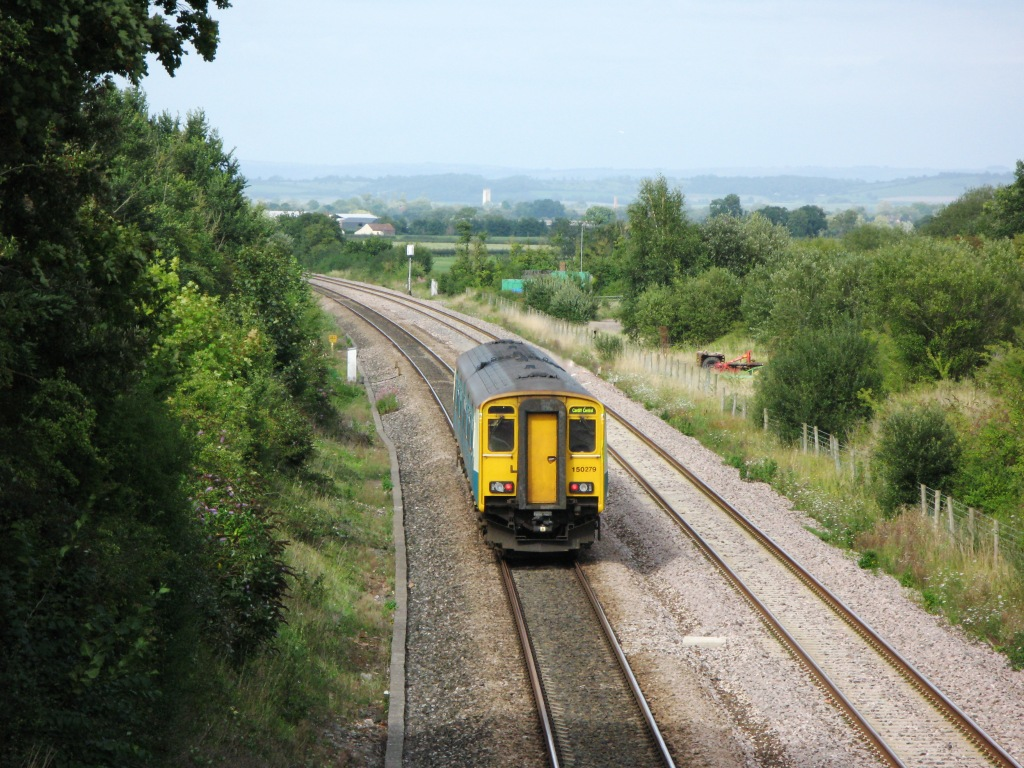
Arriva Trains Wales150279, on loan to First Great Western, speeds past the site of Durston station, with a service from Taunton to Cardiff Central

The Bristol and Exeter opened its Yeovil Branch Line on 1 October 1853 from a new station situated at the north end of the cutting at Durston (51.0502°N 2.9893°W).

Despite the Langport and Castle Cary Railway opening in 1906, which effectively left Durston and Lyng Halt on a loop line from Cogload Junction, the station continued to serve the branch. The locomotive turntable was taken out of use on 21 September 1952 and the branch closed on 6 July 1964, with Durston station remaining open only until 5 October 1964. The only remains today are the Station Hotel and the trackbed of the old branch running off across the moors towards Athelney.

==== Creech St Michael Halt ====
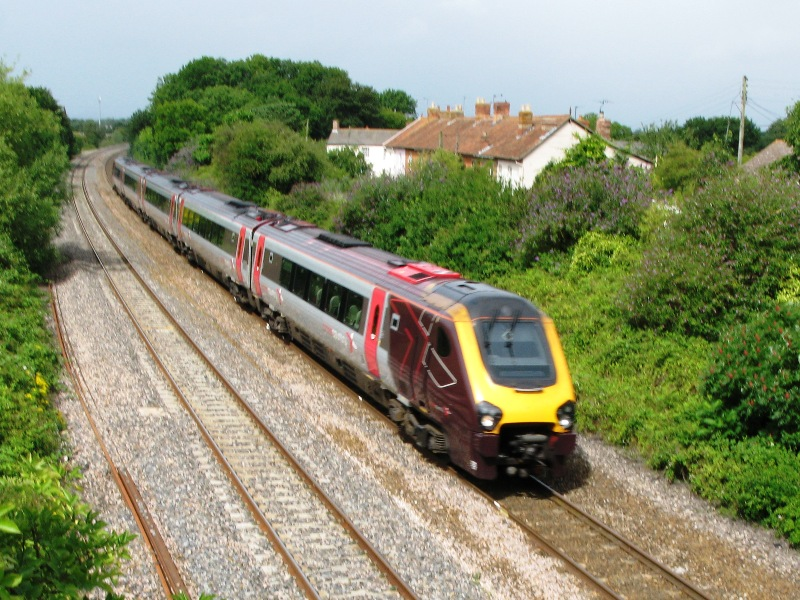
CrossCountry221136 speeds eastwards past the site of Creech St Michael Halt

A branch line, the Chard branch, from Taunton to Chard Central was opened on 19 July 1860. The junction was actually at Creech but no station was provided. A halt (51.0237°N 3.0395°W) was eventually opened to serve Creech St Michael by the Great Western Railway on 13 August 1928, but this was north of the junction so was unable to serve as a junction station. It cost £628 to build.

Three years later it had to be rebuilt to allow for the two extra tracks to be laid from Cogload Junction to Taunton, after which the platforms were only available to the relief lines on the outside; trains on the main lines, which were generally running to and from London Paddington, could not call.

The station closed on 5 October 1964. There are no visible remains.

=== Taunton to Exeter ===
==== Norton Fitzwarren ====
The West Somerset Railway opened on 31 March 1862 from a junction at Norton Fitzwarren, but there was no station here and trains continued the short distance to Taunton railway station. A second branch was added on 8 June 1871 when the first section of the Devon and Somerset Railway was opened to Wiveliscombe.

Norton Fitzwarren railway station (51.0234°N 3.1491°W) was finally opened on 1 June 1873 to facilitate the interchange of passengers between the three lines. A new station was opened a little nearer Taunton on 2 December 1931, now with two double-sided platforms to cater for the additional two tracks that ran from Cogload Junction to Norton Fitzwarren.

The station has been the scene of several serious accidents. On 11 November 1890 there was a fatal collision due to a signalman's error; the driver misreading signals caused a fatal derailment on 4 November 1940; and a train on fire was brought to a stand after passing the site on 6 July 1978, but several passengers were killed.

By this time the station had closed: to passengers from 30 October 1961 and to goods from 6 July 1964. A private siding serving a cider factory was in use for several years but is currently out of use. The only remains visible is the Station Hotel, standing empty on the west side of the line.

==== Wellington (Somerset) ====
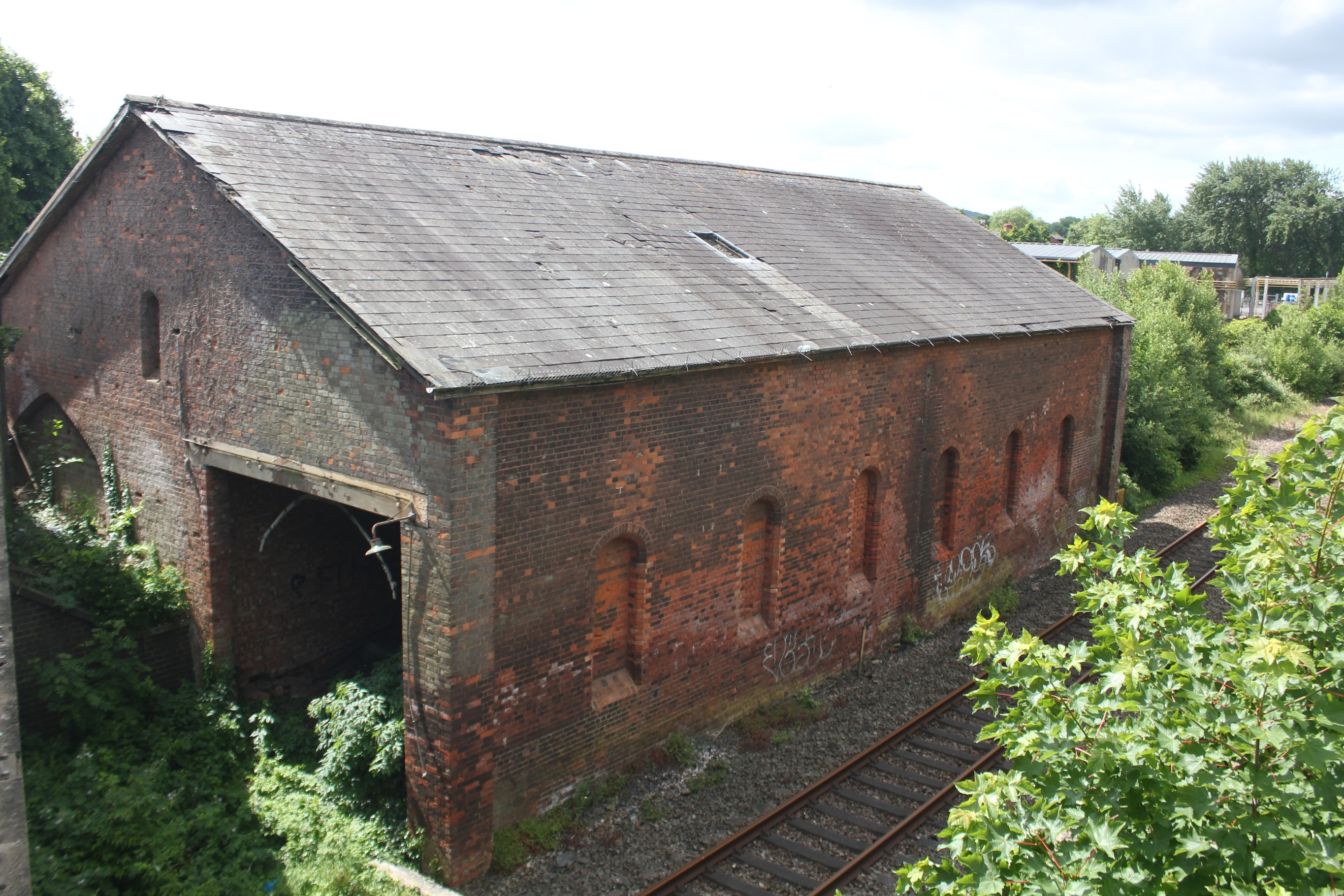
The goods shed at Wellington in 2025

A station (50.9837°N 3.2411°W) was opened at Wellington when the line reached the town on 1 May 1843. It was a typical Brunel design but was rebuilt in 1932 when two loop lines were put in. This entailed the platforms being moved back to accommodate the widened lines. These platforms are clearly visible and a goods shed still stands on the east side of the line at the Taunton end of the station, although the station closed on 5 October 1964.

Wellington was an important station as it stood at the foot of a steep incline. Banking locomotives were kept here, ready to assist heavy westbound trains up to Whiteball Tunnel.

The government awarded funding from its Restoring Your Railway fund in May 2020 for a feasibility study into reopening the station. This was one of ten successful bids in the first round of applications to the fund. In the October 2021 budget, development funding of £5m was allocated for the reopening of Wellington and Cullompton stations. However in 2024, the future of the station was cast into doubt after the government scrapped the 'Restoring Your Railway' programme. Following the government's spending review in June 2025, funding was confirmed for the station.

==== Beambridge ====
The most short-lived of all the stations on the line, Beambridge (50.9667°N 3.2717°W) was opened on 1 May 1843 as a temporary terminus while work was continuing on the Whiteball Tunnel. It was closed exactly one year later when the line was completed to Exeter. Road coaches used what is now the A38 road for that one year to carry passengers from terminating trains to their destinations further west. There are no visible remains, but its location is easily identified as being where the A38 road crosses the railway, although it is now carried over the line on a modern flyover – the road of 1841 is the quiet lane below.

==== Burlescombe ====
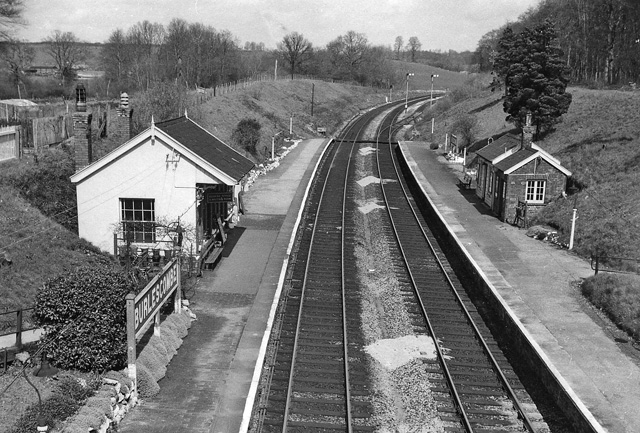
Burlescombe station in 1963

A station (50.9449°N 3.3208°W) was opened at Burlescombe, a little to the west of Whiteball Tunnel, in 1867. A siding on the west side served the railway's nearby ballast quarry at Westleigh; this siding had originally been a 3 ft (914 mm) gauge line while the main line was 7 ft 1/4 in (2,140 mm). Both lines were converted at different times to 4 ft 8 1/2 in (1,435 mm) – the main line in 1892 and the quarry line in 1899. The station closed on 5 October 1964.

==== Sampford Peverell ====
This station (50.9170°N 3.3598°W) opened at Sampford Peverell on 9 July 1928 with wooden platforms. Loop lines were installed in 1932 to allow slow trains to be moved aside to let fast ones overtake, and new concrete platforms were provided to serve them. The station only saw 36 years' use; the original station closed on 5 October 1964, the down loop was removed in 1966 and the up loop and sidings in 1968. The site has since been rebuilt as Tiverton Parkway, which opened on 12 May 1986.

==== Tiverton Junction ====
A station (50.8939°N 3.3771°W), known as "Tiverton Road", was opened with the railway to Exeter on 1 May 1844, although it was actually located at Willand, which was the nearest that the railway came to Tiverton. It was renamed "Tiverton Junction" on 12 June 1848, when Tiverton railway station, at the end of a branch from the Junction station, opened. A second branch, the Culm Valley Light Railway, opened on 29 May 1876.

The station was widened to four tracks in 1932; two new platforms being built facing the new loop lines but the centre tracks were only used for non-stopping trains. Goods traffic was withdrawn on 8 May 1967, the Tiverton branch closed for passengers in 1964 and for freight in June 1967. The Culm Valley line had closed to passengers on 7 September 1963, although the line remained in use for goods trains until 31 October 1975.

The Junction station continued to be served by a couple of trains each day for about twenty years but was then closed on 11 May 1986 to be replaced by the better sited Tiverton Parkway. The location is now known as "Tiverton Loops" and platforms can still be seen alongside the now extended loops; engineers use the remaining sidings on the down side.

==== Cullompton ====
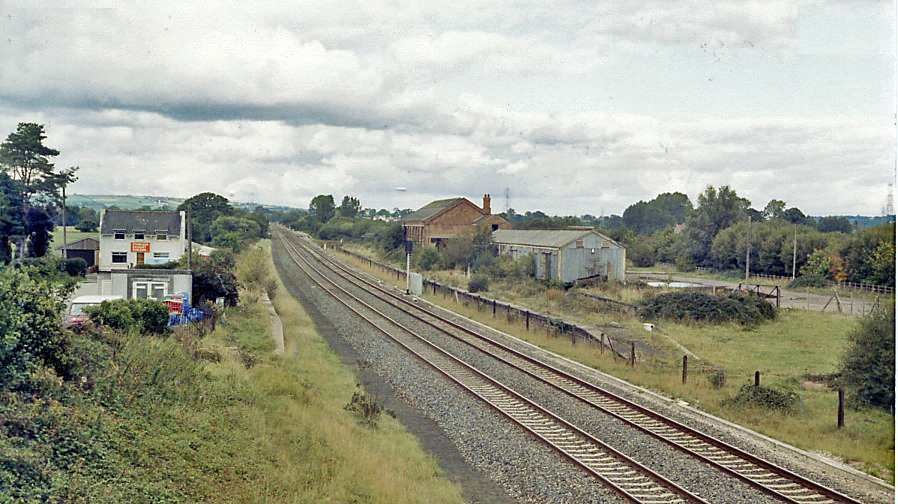
Cullompton station as it was in 1984

A station (50.8617°N 3.3851°W) was opened at Cullompton when the railway opened on 1 May 1844. In 1931 the platforms were moved back, the lines were widened to provide two passing loops and a new goods shed and waiting room were constructed. The station closed to passengers on 5 October 1964, but goods traffic continued until 8 May the next year.

The site is now occupied by Cullompton Services for the adjacent M5 motorway. There is land allocated for re-opening a station at Cullompton but forecast demand is relatively low and so the proposal is for the longer term. In July 2016 Mid Devon District Council announced that it would spend £40k on engineering design work to test the viability of their concept for a new station. This matched a previous commitment by Taunton Deane Borough Council of £40k and £10k contributions from the town councils of Cullompton and Wellington.

As part of the "Devon Metro" plans by Devon County Council there would be a station near the location of the old station and could form part of the route. The station is a 'possible' long term proposal. A grant from the government's Restoring Your Railway Fund was awarded in May 2020 to finance a feasibility study, one of ten projects which were approved in the first round of applications. This was one of ten successful bids in the first round of applications to the fund. In the October 2021 budget, development funding of £5m was allocated for the reopening of Wellington and Cullompton stations. However, in 2024 the Minister of State for Rail, Peter Hendy, stated that the proposed reopening of Cullompton station would no longer be funded by the UK government. Following the government's spending review in June 2025, funding was confirmed for the station.

==== Hele and Bradninch ====
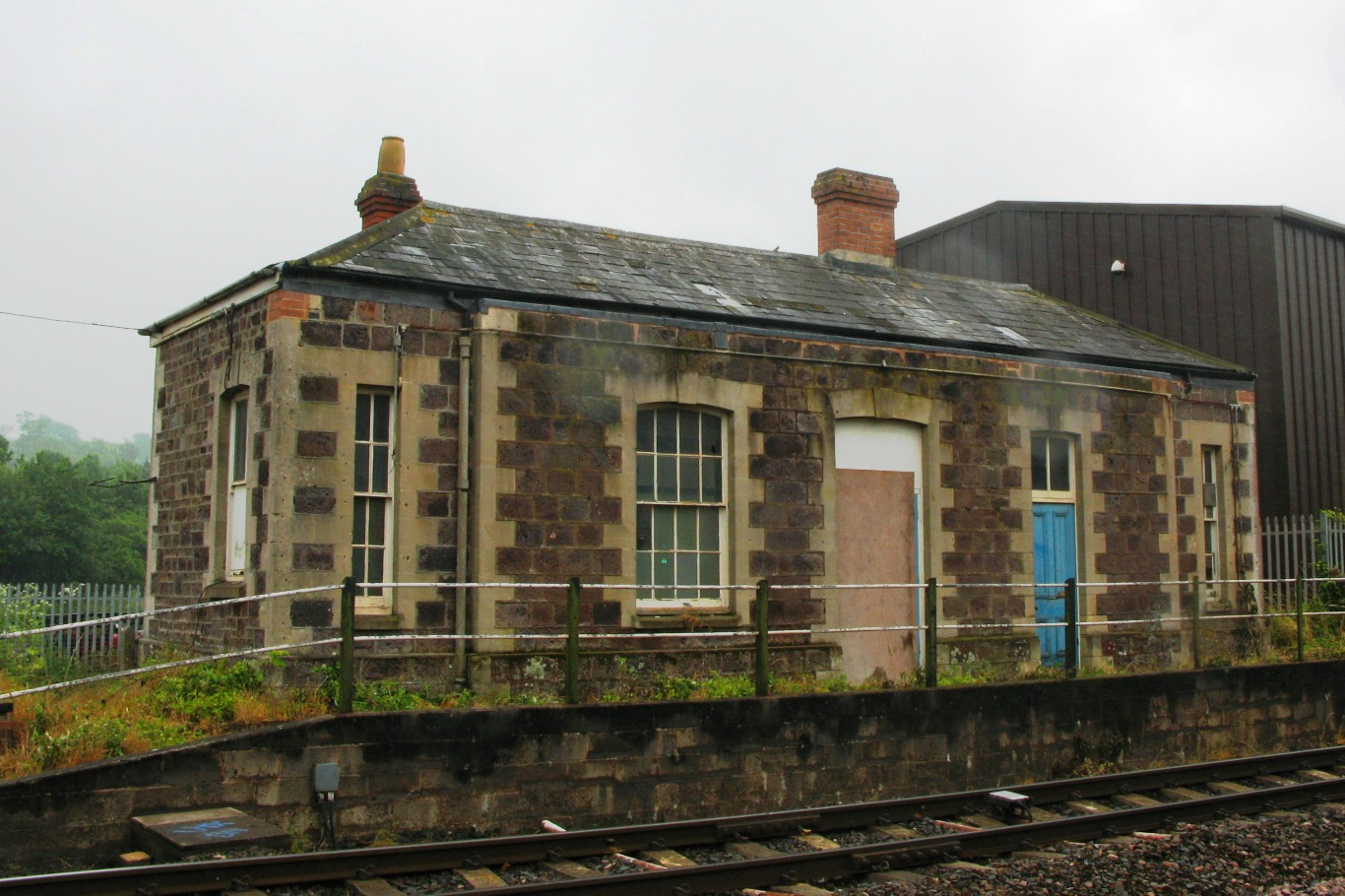
The old station building at Hele and Bradninch

Originally named "Hele" when opened on 1 May 1844, from 1867 it was known as Hele and Bradninch (50.8113°N 3.4273°W). A siding to the Hele Paper factory was laid in 1919 and used up to the 1980s.

Passenger services were withdrawn on 5 October 1964 but public freight facilities were kept until 17 May 1965. The old Bristol and Exeter Railway signal box was closed on 9 December 1985 when control of the level crossing was transferred to the new panel signal box at Exeter.

The station is recognisable today, with the empty signal box still remaining at the north end of the southbound platform, one of the buildings still on the platform, and the goods shed opposite (which is now in use by a motor engineering company).

==== Silverton ====
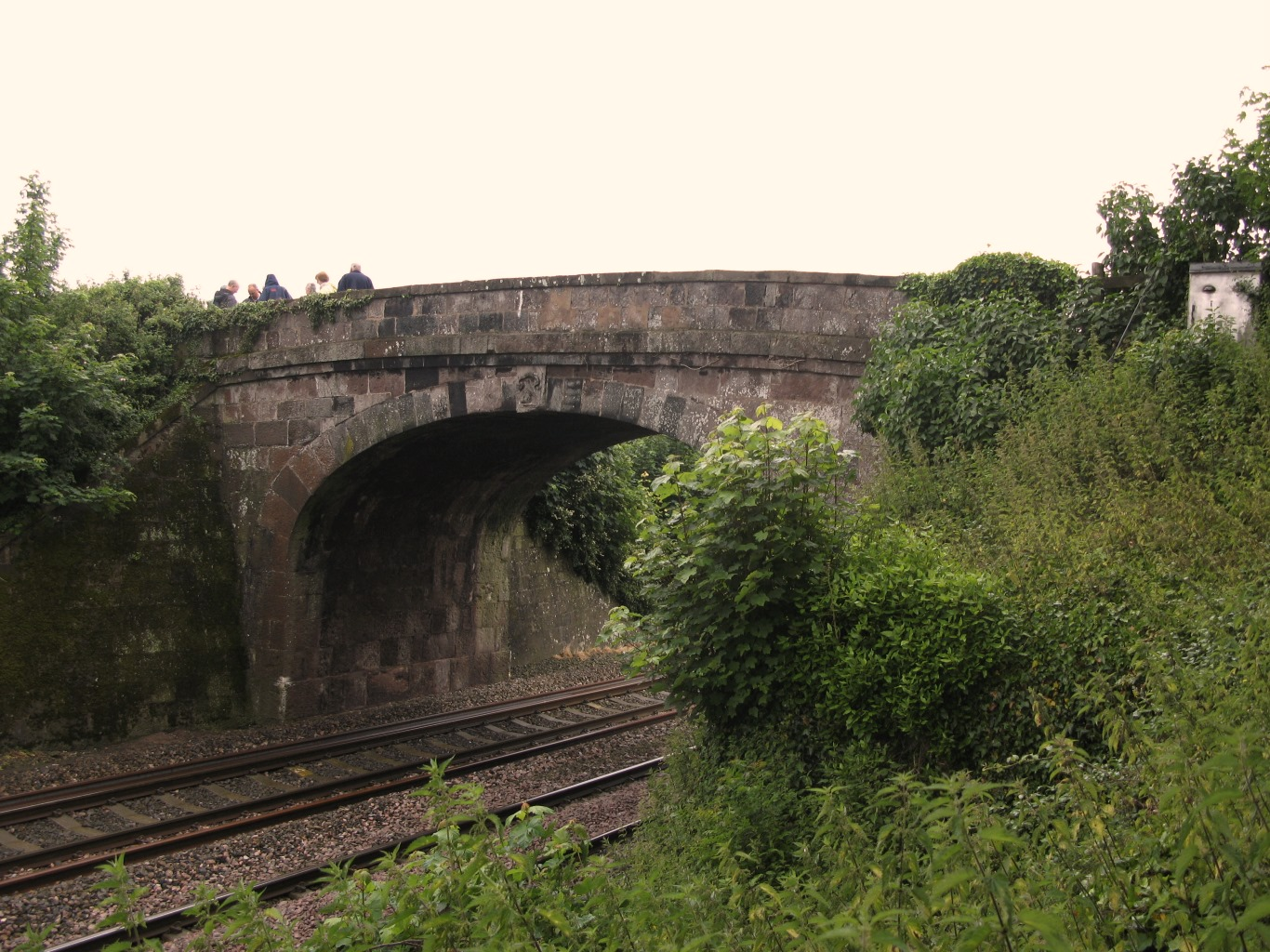
The bridge at the site of Silverton

A station (50.8050°N 3.4532°W) opened at Silverton on 1 November 1867. The platforms were staggered, with the up (northbound) platform closer to Tiverton than the down platform.

The station was closed to passengers on 5 October 1964. Freight traffic continued until 3 May 1965 but a private siding serving a paper mill, which had been opened on 26 July 1894, was closed on 31 August 1967.

==== Stoke Canon ====
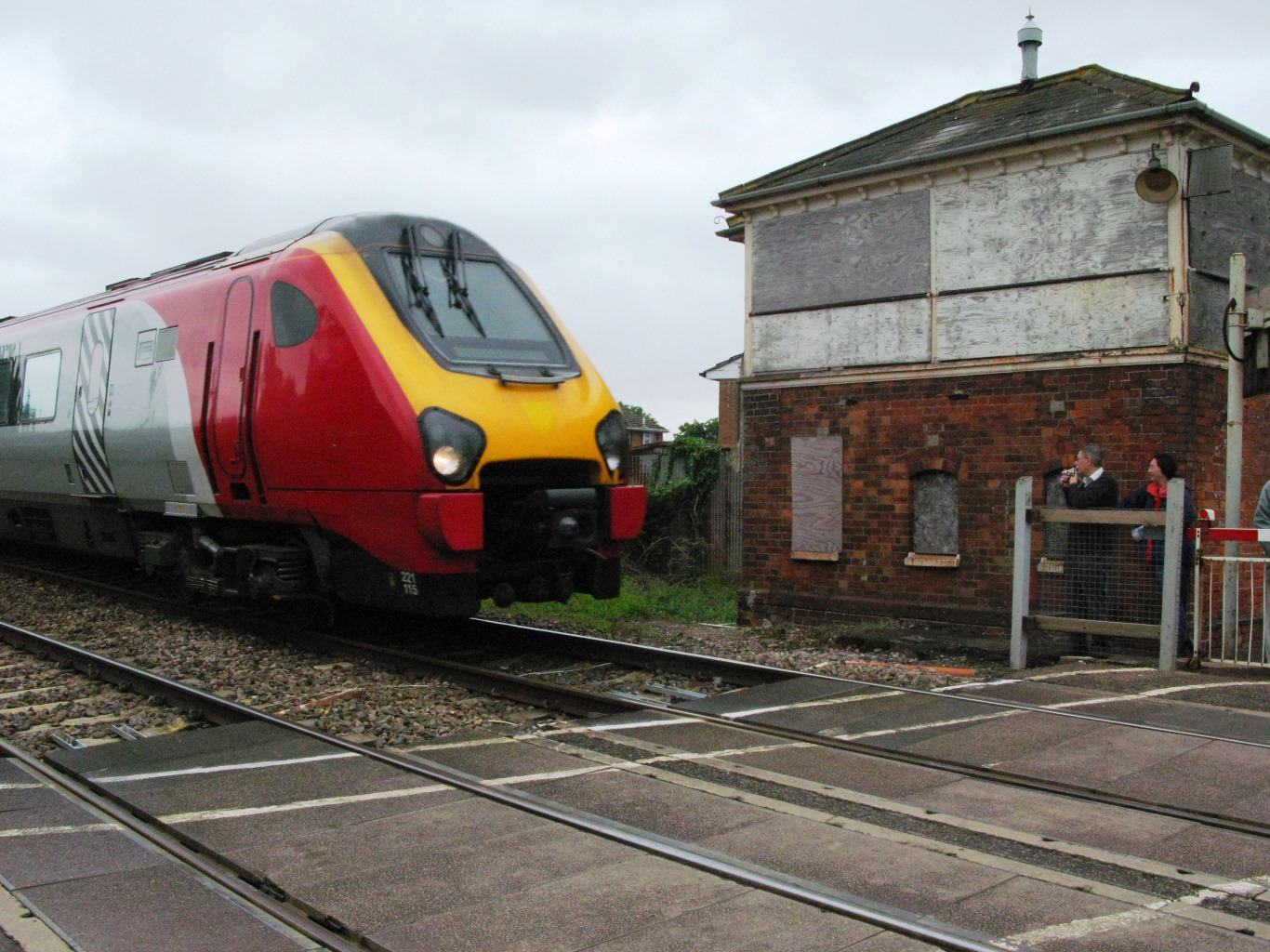
221115 heads south past the signal box at Stoke Canon in 2008

A station opened to serve Stoke Canon in 1860 with staggered platforms. The up platform was north of the level crossing; the down platform was to the south.

On 1 May 1885 the Exe Valley Railway was opened from a junction a little to the south of the station. Stoke Canon station was then relocated further south (50.7679°N 3.5135°W) so that it could serve both lines from 2 July 1894. As with most stations on the Taunton to Exeter line, the platforms were moved apart in 1932 to accommodate new loop lines, and the branch was given its own side of the up platform so that trains could run on to the branch while a train stood in the up loop.

It was closed to passengers on 13 June 1960 but goods traffic continued until 3 May 1965. The station signal box closed at this time, but the earlier signal box, built by the Bristol and Exeter Railway before 1876, had been retained to operate the level crossing and was not closed until 9 December 1985 when control of the level crossing was transferred to the new panel signal box at Exeter St Davids, which is the next station southwards.

== See also ==
- Disused railway stations (Exeter to Plymouth Line)
