= Puxton =

Village in Somerset, England

Coordinates: 51.3673°N 2.8540°W

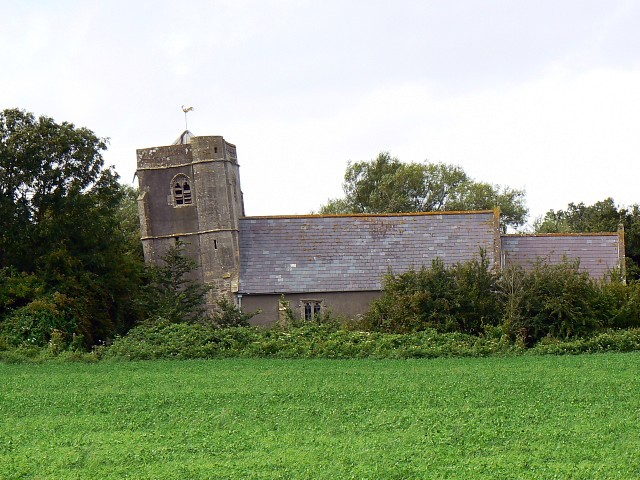
- Church of St Saviour, Puxton

- Location within Somerset
- Population: 359 (2011)
- OS grid reference: ST405635
- Unitary authority: North Somerset
- Ceremonial county: Somerset
- Region: South West
- Country: England
- Sovereign state: United Kingdom
- Post town: WESTON-SUPER-MARE
- Postcode district: BS24
- Dialling code: 01934
- Police: Avon and Somerset
- Fire: Avon
- Ambulance: South Western
- UK Parliament: Wells and Mendip Hills

Puxton is a village and civil parish, 5 miles (8.0 km) north west of Axbridge in the unitary authority of North Somerset within the ceremonial county of Somerset, England.

The civil parish includes the isolated hamlets of East Hewish and West Hewish.

== History ==
The parish was part of the Winterstoke Hundred.

Puxton was part of the manor of Banwell held by the Bishop of Bath and Wells until the reign of Henry VI when it passed to the St Loe or De Sancto Laudo family who held it for over 100 years.

Puxton Park, a family attraction with small animals, a falconry centre and farm shop, opened in 2007. The park gained some notability when it was revealed that they will not allow any single people to visit under the assumption that they are all paedophiles.

== Governance ==
The parish council has responsibility for local issues, including setting an annual precept (local rate) to cover the council's operating costs and producing annual accounts for public scrutiny. The parish council evaluates local planning applications and works with the local police, district council officers, and neighbourhood watch groups on matters of crime, security, and traffic. The parish council's role also includes initiating projects for the maintenance and repair of parish facilities, such as the village hall or community centre, playing fields and playgrounds, as well as consulting with the district council on the maintenance, repair, and improvement of highways, drainage, footpaths, public transport, and street cleaning. Conservation matters (including trees and listed buildings) and environmental issues are also of interest to the council.

The parish falls within the unitary authority of North Somerset which was created in 1996, as established by the Local Government Act 1992. It provides a single tier of local government with responsibility for almost all local government functions within their area including local planning and building control, local roads, council housing, environmental health, markets and fairs, refuse collection, recycling, cemeteries, crematoria, leisure services, parks, and tourism. They are also responsible for education, social services, libraries, main roads, public transport, trading standards, waste disposal and strategic planning, although fire, police and ambulance services are provided jointly with other authorities through the Avon Fire and Rescue Service, Avon and Somerset Constabulary and the South Western Ambulance Service.

North Somerset's area covers part of the ceremonial county of Somerset but it is administered independently of the non-metropolitan county. Its administrative headquarters are in the town hall in Weston-super-Mare. Between 1 April 1974 and 1 April 1996, it was the Woodspring district of the county of Avon. Before 1974 that the parish was part of the Axbridge Rural District.

The parish is represented in the House of Commons of the Parliament of the United Kingdom as part of the Wells and Mendip Hills constituency. It elects one Member of Parliament (MP) by the first past the post system of election.

== Geography ==
Nearby is Puxton Moor, a Site of Special Scientific Interest. It is a large area of pasture land networked with species-rich rhynes, now owned and managed as a nature reserve by Avon Wildlife Trust. The rhynes contain rare plants such as frogbit and rootless duckweed, along with many scarce invertebrates such as the hairy dragonfly and water scorpion. Birds seen at the site include; skylark, reed and sedge warblers, Eurasian whimbrel, whitethroat and reed bunting. The site also contains a relict Roman landscape which is evident in many of the fields; Medieval earthworks are also present.

== Transport ==
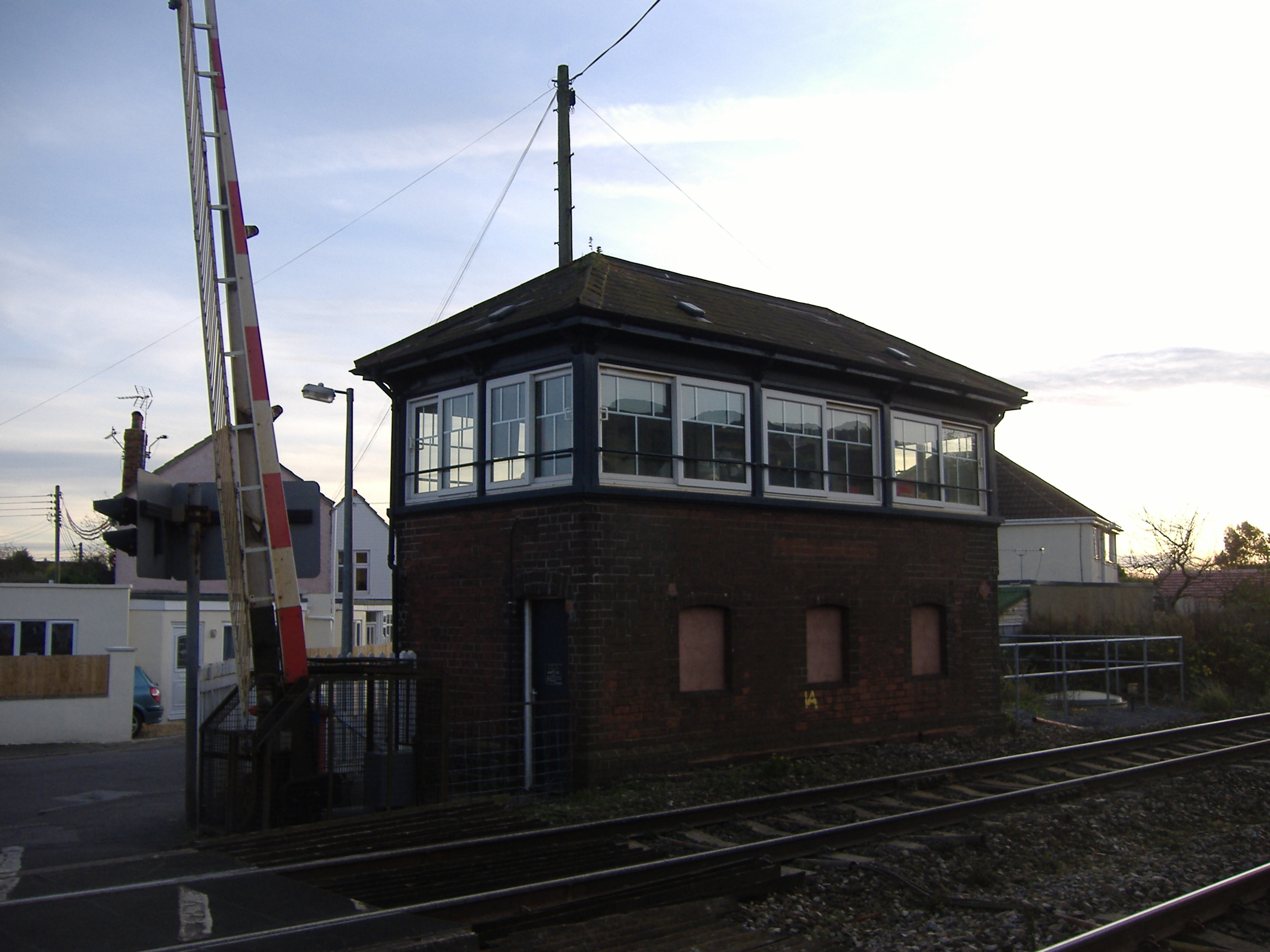
The Puxton station signal box has been retained to operate the level crossings here and at nearby Hewish.

The nearest railway station is Worle railway station. Puxton and Worle railway station was opened on 14 June 1841 a little further east. It was originally named 'Banwell Road' but this was changed to 'Worle' on 3 August 1869. On 1 March 1884 the Weston Loop Line was opened and a new 'Worle' station provided on this, just west of the new Worle Junction. This station closed on 2 January 1922 so the original station, which had been known as 'Puxton' during this time, was renamed "Puxton and Worle".

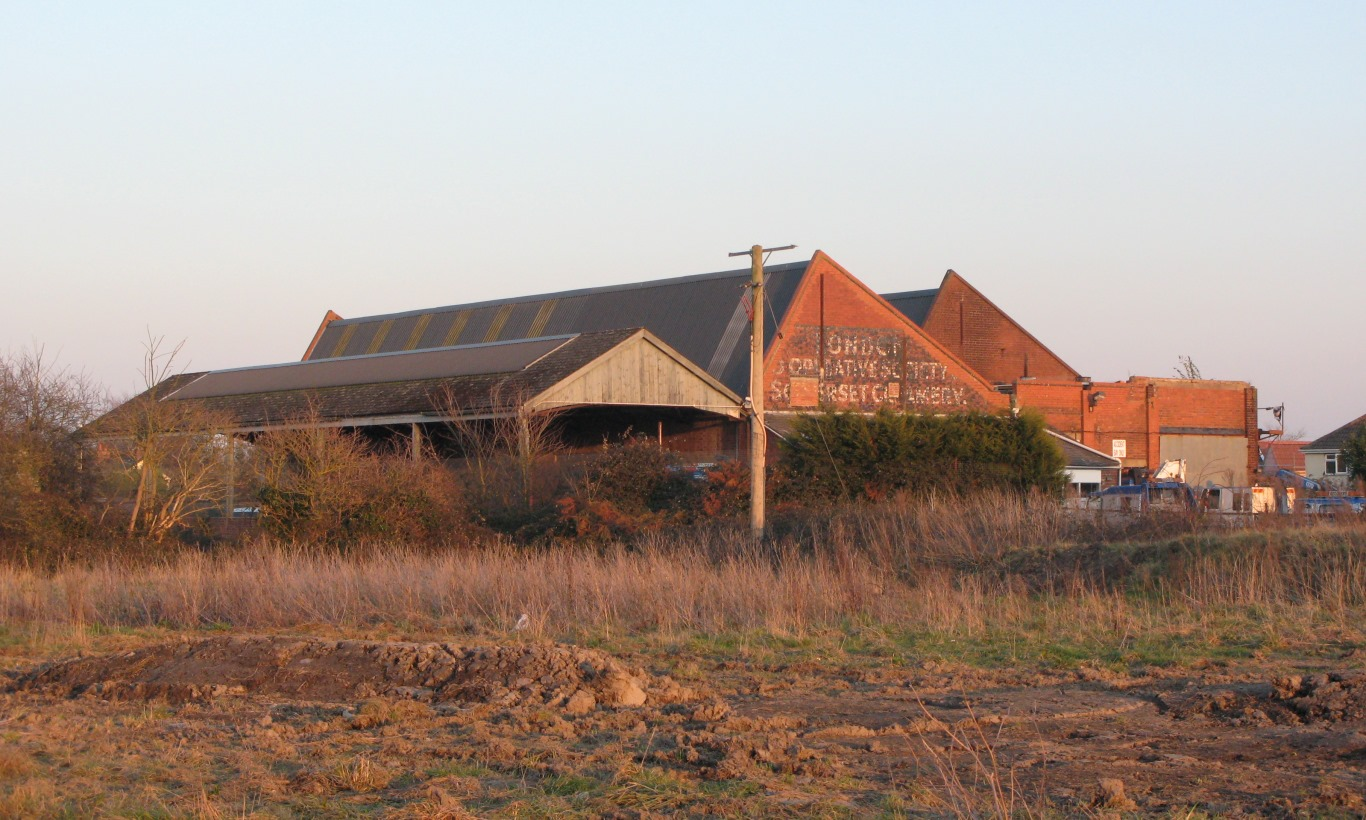
Former London Co-operative Society creamery at Puxton station

Puxton was a railhead for the milk trains of the London Co-operative Society, who built a creamery next to the station, which was served by its own private siding.

The station closed on 6 April 1964. The platforms and station master's house can still be seen immediately east of Puxton level crossing, which is still controlled by a Great Western Railway-built signal box. A goods shed was demolished sometime between 2004 and 2008 to make way for new buildings. On the opposite side of the line is an old milk depot that was rail-connected from 1925 to 1966 but is now used by a business that repairs road goods vehicles.

The village is close to the junction of the M5 motorway and A370 road.

== The Holy Saviour Church ==
The Parish Church of St Saviour dates from the 13th century. It is a small, mostly unaltered medieval church with a leaning tower due to the peaty foundations which the church was built upon, and has the royal arms of 1751 over the south door. It is a Grade I listed building.

== Puxton and Stephen Rippon ==
Stephen Rippon is a leading archaeologist on the Romano-British and Anglo-Saxon period and has carried out extensive archaeological work on Puxton developing his ideas of Wetland reclamation of the Somerset Levels.
