= London Co-operative Society =

Former consumer co-operative in London, England

The London Co-operative Society (LCS) was a consumer co-operative society in the United Kingdom.

== History ==
The Society was formed in September 1920 by the amalgamation of the Stratford Co-operative Society and the Edmonton Co-operative Society, two of the largest societies in the London Metropolitan area, forming the largest retail co-operative society in the United Kingdom. Initially, the LCS headquarters were located at 54 Maryland Street, Stratford, E.15. A key agreement reached with the London Trades Council and London Labour Party led to a plan to develop in Central London a meeting centre consisting of restaurant, general store, club and hall accommodations to address an unmet need of the city.

In 1921, the LCS was also joined by the West London Society, the Kingston Society and the Co-operative Brotherhood Trust. In addition, the Society also took over two branches of the Staines Co-operative Party. The consolidation of co-operative societies in the Greater London area continued until 1938, with the absorption of Hendon Co-operative Society in 1925, the North West London Co-operative Society in 1928, the Epping Co-operative Society in 1929, the Yiewsley Co-operative Society in 1931, the Willesden Junction Railway Society in 1935 and the Radlett Co-operative Society in 1938. Hence, the LCS was able to extend its area of the counties of Middlesex, Essex, Hertfordshire and Surrey. The company's general manager through part of this period (1924–1933) was Sidney Foster, who in 1933 went on to manage the Milk Marketing Board.

By 1946, LCS had reached a membership of 832,670 members, the highest of any of Britain's co-operatives, and had an annual revenue of £19 million. Also in 1946, LCS acquired 200 Oxford Street in London, which had been the headquarters of the BBC Overseas Service since 1941; LCS moved its headquarters into the building in 1949.

By 1952, the LCS and its associated co-operative organisations, the major being the London Co-operative Chemists Limited, had over 550 establishments of sales and services, varying from large department stores to small grocery shops.

By 1963, the London Society was noted as being the largest co-operative of its kind in the world, which was led by John Stonehouse as President at the time, who also served as a Labour Member of Parliament.

In 1981, Co-operative Retail Services acquired LCS, which had been losing millions of pounds.

== Operations and influence ==
The LCS played a large part in the national co-operative movement and was a member of the national and regional organisations, chief of which being the Co-operative Union to which the LCS subscribed. The LCS was also a shareholding member of the English Co-operative Wholesale Society, generally known as the CWS, a federal wholesaling organisation for co-operative societies in England and Wales.

1950s-era establishments consisted of grocers, butchers, fruit, vegetable and flower sellers, coal depots, furniture sellers, drapers, tailors, footwear sellers, chemists, laundries, estate agencies, funeral services and even guesthouses.

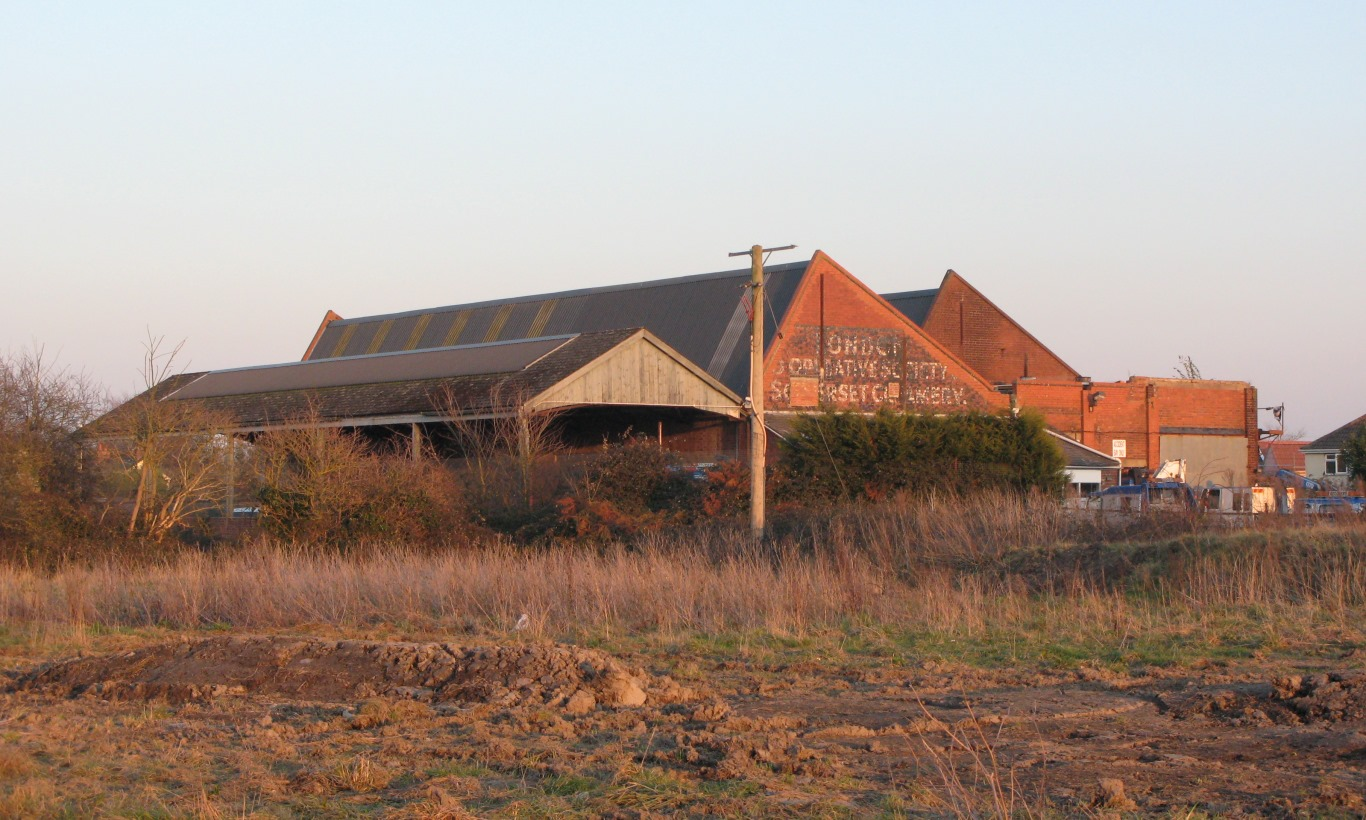
Former London Co-operative Society creamery and railhead for milk trains at Puxton, Somerset on the Bristol to Exeter line

LCS administered many manufacturing and processing establishments. It had creameries located at various places in the West Country, including Puxton, Somerset which served as a regional railhead, product from which was transported via milk trains to the main London creamery and distribution point at West Ealing.

== Politics ==
Politically, the Society has also had a major impact. In the interwar years, the LCS Political Committee played an important role in winning Londoners over to the Labour Party, mobilising people behind co-operative ideals, and shaping policy at a national level, working as part of the national Co-operative Party.

In 1938, LCS initiated a boycott against Japanese goods, encouraging the Cooperative Wholesale Society to follow its example.

At the 1945 election, all 11 LCS-sponsored candidates were elected, including Dan Chater in Bethnal Green North East, Percy Holman in Bethnal Green South West and C.S.Ganley in Battersea South. Alfred Barnes, also elected for East Ham South, even became a Cabinet Minister in the Attlee administration after 1945.

In the post-war world, it continued as an important campaigning force, providing key organisational backing for mass movements like Campaign for Nuclear Disarmament, Anti-Apartheid, supporting the fight against the Vietnam War and campaigns during the miner's strikes, and generally at the forefront of the campaign for peace, co-operation and socialism. A political presence was also maintained in the House of Commons through the work of MPs, such as Stan Newens and Laurie Pavitt. Alf Lomas (the former Secretary of the London Co-op Political Committee) was also an MEP and Leader of the British Labour Group of MEPs.

== Other London-area consumer co-operative societies ==
- South Suburban Co-operative Society
- Royal Arsenal Co-operative Society
- Enfield Highway Co-operative Society
- Invicta Co-operative Society
