= Weston Milton railway station =

Railway station in Weston-super-Mare, England

Weston Milton
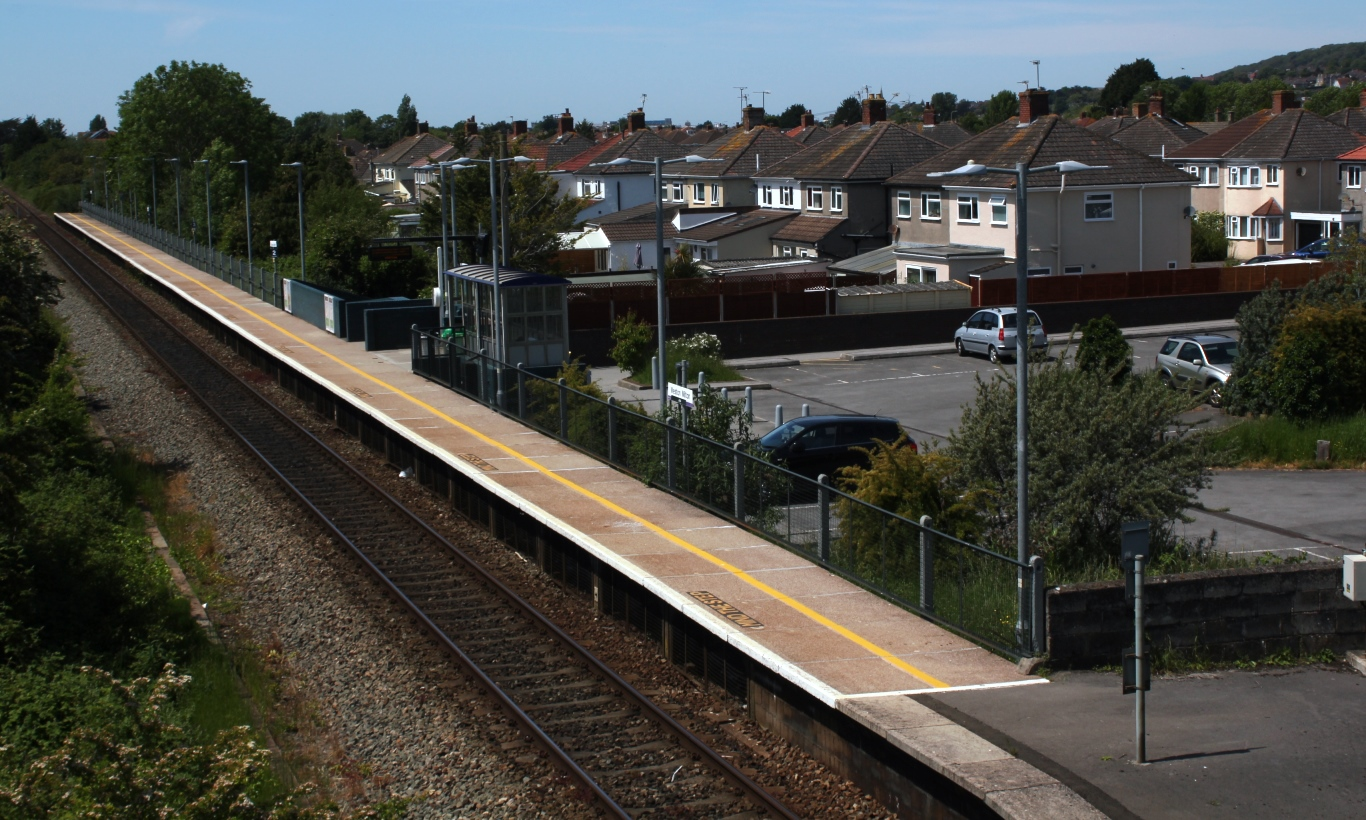

General information
- Location: Weston-super-Mare, North Somerset; England
- Coordinates: 51.348°N 2.9433°W
- Grid reference: ST344614
- Manager: Great Western Railway
- Platforms: 1

Other information
- Station code: WNM
- Classification: DfT category F2

History
- Original company: Great Western Railway

Key dates
- 1933: Opened
- 1972: Reduced to one platform
- 1983: Refurbished

Passengers
- 2021/22: ▲66,964
- 2022/23: ▲94,086
- 2023/24: ▲98,862
- 2024/25: ▲0.107 million
- 2025/26: ▲0.117 million
Location
Notes
- Passenger statistics from the Office of Rail and Road

Weston Milton railway station serves the Milton and Locking Castle areas of Weston-super-Mare in North Somerset, England. It is situated on a loop off the Bristol to Taunton Line, 136 miles 12 chains (136.15 mi; 219.1 km) from the zero point at London Paddington via Box.

== History ==
The station was opened as "Weston Milton Halt" on 3 July 1933 to serve the expansion of the Milton area to the east of the town centre. The name "halt" indicated that it was an unstaffed station but with platforms of sufficient length to accommodate full-sized trains. Access to the two platforms, which were built of pre-cast concrete sections, was from the Locking Moor Road at the east end of the station.

When the line was singled between Worle Junction and Weston-super-Mare on 31 January 1972 it was the northern or "up" line that was retained. After a while the line was relaid in the centre of the formation. To do this the new track was initially laid on the abandoned down formation and trains called for a short while at the old down platform while the up line was lifted and the up platform moved to be partly in its place. The new line was then slewed over to run alongside the platform after which the down platform was dismantled and reused for the new Lympstone Commando railway station.

In 1983, £30,000 was spent to provide a new waiting shelter and refurbish the car park. The entrance was moved from the bridge to be nearer the middle of the platform. With the opening of Worle railway station on 24 September 1990 a number of commuters changed to using that station, but improved daytime services and the new Locking Castle housing development have mitigated this loss of passengers.

== Description ==
The station is located in Saville Road and consists of just one small platform (on the left hand side of the train when travelling towards Bristol).

== Services ==
All trains are operated by Great Western Railway. The basic pattern of services is for an hourly train between Weston-super-Mare and Severn Beach which calls at all stations. There are a few commuter services which run instead to Cardiff Central or to Bath Spa and then on to London Paddington. Many of these services are operated by Class 800s which are too long for the platform, so only the first seven coaches are able to stop alongside the platform.

Preceding station	National Rail	Following station
Worle	Great Western Railway (Bristol to Taunton Line)	Weston-super-Mare

== Future developments ==
The Network Rail Business Plan for 2007 proposed that the line should be doubled from Worle Junction as far as the east side of the station in 2008, with a further phase later extending the double track through the station as far as Weston-super-Mare. In the following year's Business Plan Update it was noted as being "subject to a positive business case".

The Weston Package Phase 1 strategic planning guidance suggests that the station 'could' be relocated underneath a proposed new bridge that would link Herluin Way and Locking Road. A new station could have longer platforms that can take larger trains which will be an important aspect of unlocking employment opportunities in the redevelopment of the former Weston Airfield.
