= Weston-super-Mare railway station =

Railway station in Somerset, England

Weston-super-Mare
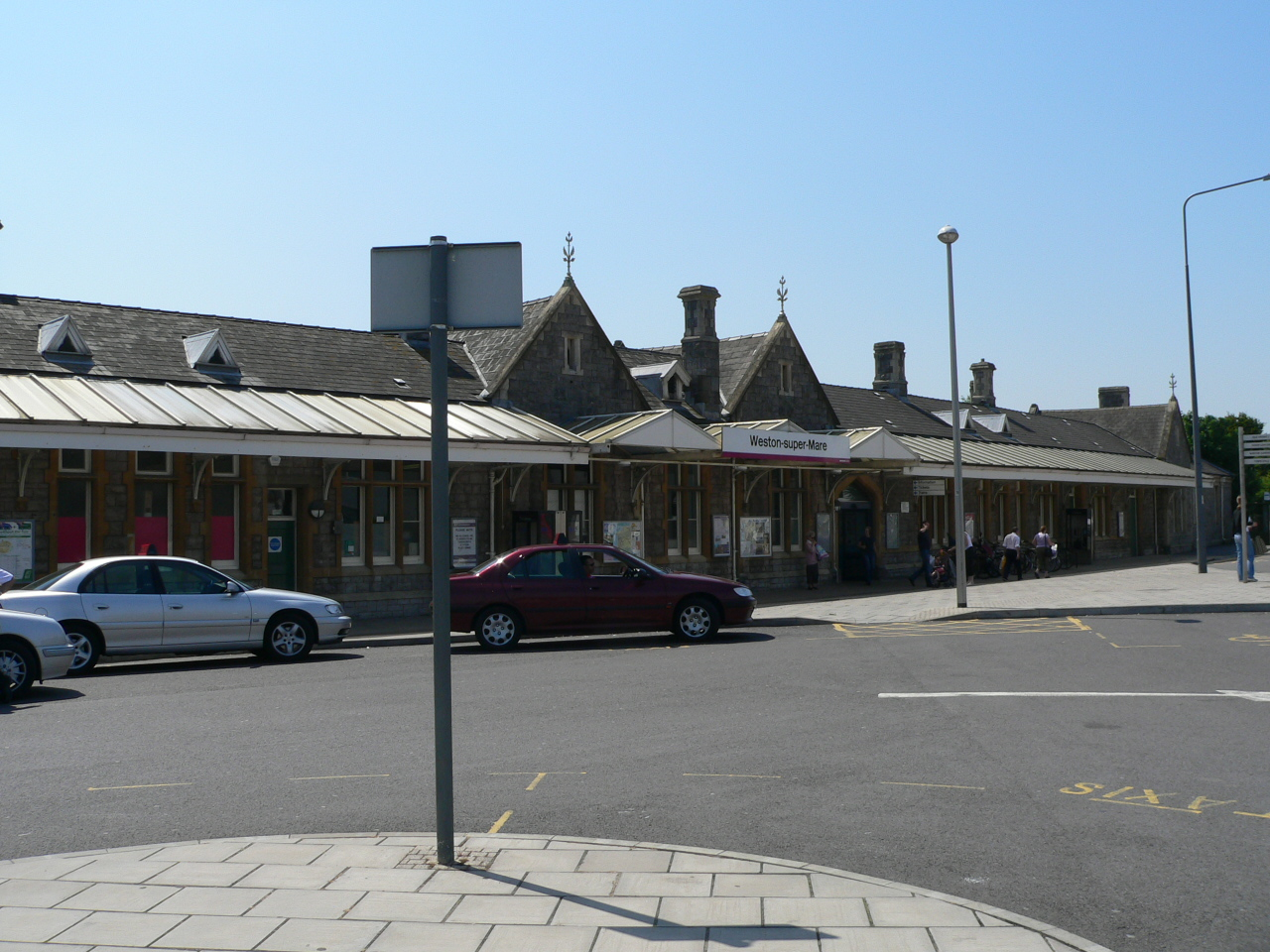

General information
- Location: Weston-super-Mare, North Somerset, England
- Coordinates: 51.3446°N 2.9716°W
- Grid reference: ST324610
- Manager: Great Western Railway
- Platforms: 2

Other information
- Station code: WSM
- Classification: DfT category C2

History
- Original company: Bristol and Exeter Railway
- Pre-grouping: Great Western Railway
- Post-grouping: Great Western Railway

Key dates
- 1841: Terminus opened
- 1866: Replaced by second station
- 1884: Replaced by present station
- 1972: Branch line singled

Passengers
- 2020/21: ▼0.307 million
- Interchange: ▼3,295
- 2021/22: ▲0.778 million
- Interchange: ▲9,719
- 2022/23: ▲0.940 million
- Interchange: ▼6,498
- 2023/24: ▲0.965 million
- Interchange: ▲7,088
- 2024/25: ▲1.041 million
- Interchange: ▲8,823

Listed Building – Grade II
- Feature: Weston-super-Mare railway station
- Designated: 20 November 2017
- Reference no.: 1448779
Location
Notes
- Passenger statistics from the Office of Rail and Road

Weston-super-Mare railway station serves the seaside town of Weston-super-Mare, in North Somerset, England. It is situated on a loop off the main Bristol to Taunton Line, 137 miles 33 chains (137.41 mi; 221.1 km) down the line from London Paddington, via Box.

The station is managed by Great Western Railway. It consists of two platforms linked by a covered footbridge. Trains may use either platform in either direction and many services are booked to pass each other at the station.

== History ==
=== 1841 station ===
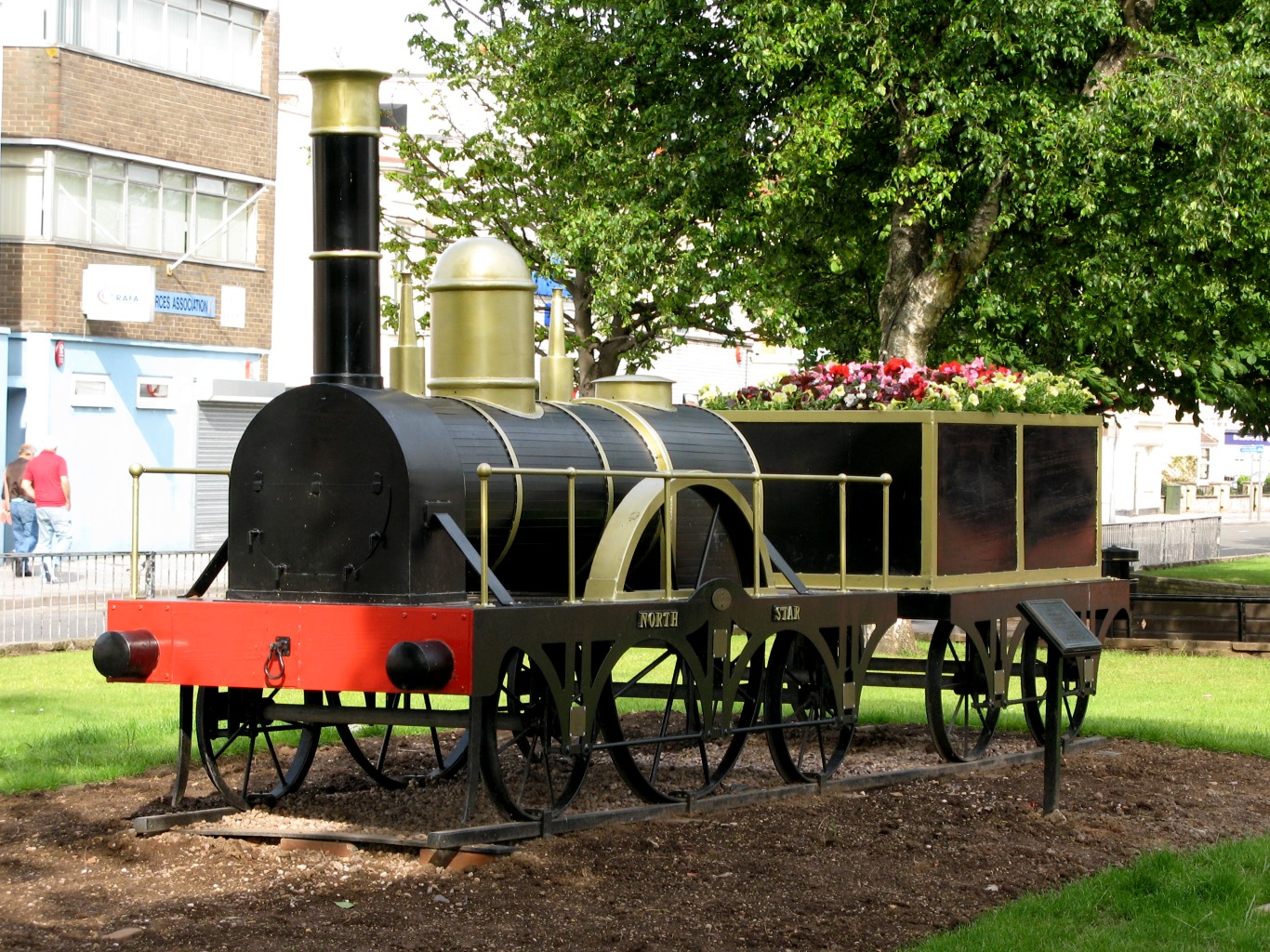
A replica of the locomotive North Star at the site of the first station

The Bristol and Exeter Railway arrived in Weston-super-Mare on 14 June 1841. This was not the route that serves today's station, but rather a single-track branch line from Weston Junction railway station, midway between the present-day Worle and Uphill junctions, which terminated at a small station in Regent Street close to the High Street.

The trains on this first branch line were made up of two or three small carriages which were hauled by a team of three horses. It was reported that when a strong wind was blowing towards the train, passengers sometimes got out and walked as it could be quicker. By 1850, a limited number of trains were being worked by steam locomotives, but horses continued to be used on certain trains until 31 March 1851.

The station had a train shed that covered two tracks, although only one passenger platform was provided. Between this and the High Street was the Railway Hotel; in the other direction, a level crossing was provided to carry the line across Locking Road, the eastwards continuation of Regent Street. A small engine shed was eventually provided here to house the steam locomotive.

After closure, the land was eventually gifted to the town and planted with trees, giving rise to its unofficial name of "The Plantation". A floral clock was built on the site of the station building. Although the mechanism has not worked for many years, the raised flower bed is still planted each year to commemorate a local or national event. Next to this is a scale replica of North Star, the first locomotive to run on the Great Western Railway. It was erected in 2006 to commemorate to 200th anniversary of the birth of Isambard Kingdom Brunel, the engineer who designed this first station. The Railway Hotel is currently known as Tavern Inn the Town.

=== 1866 station ===
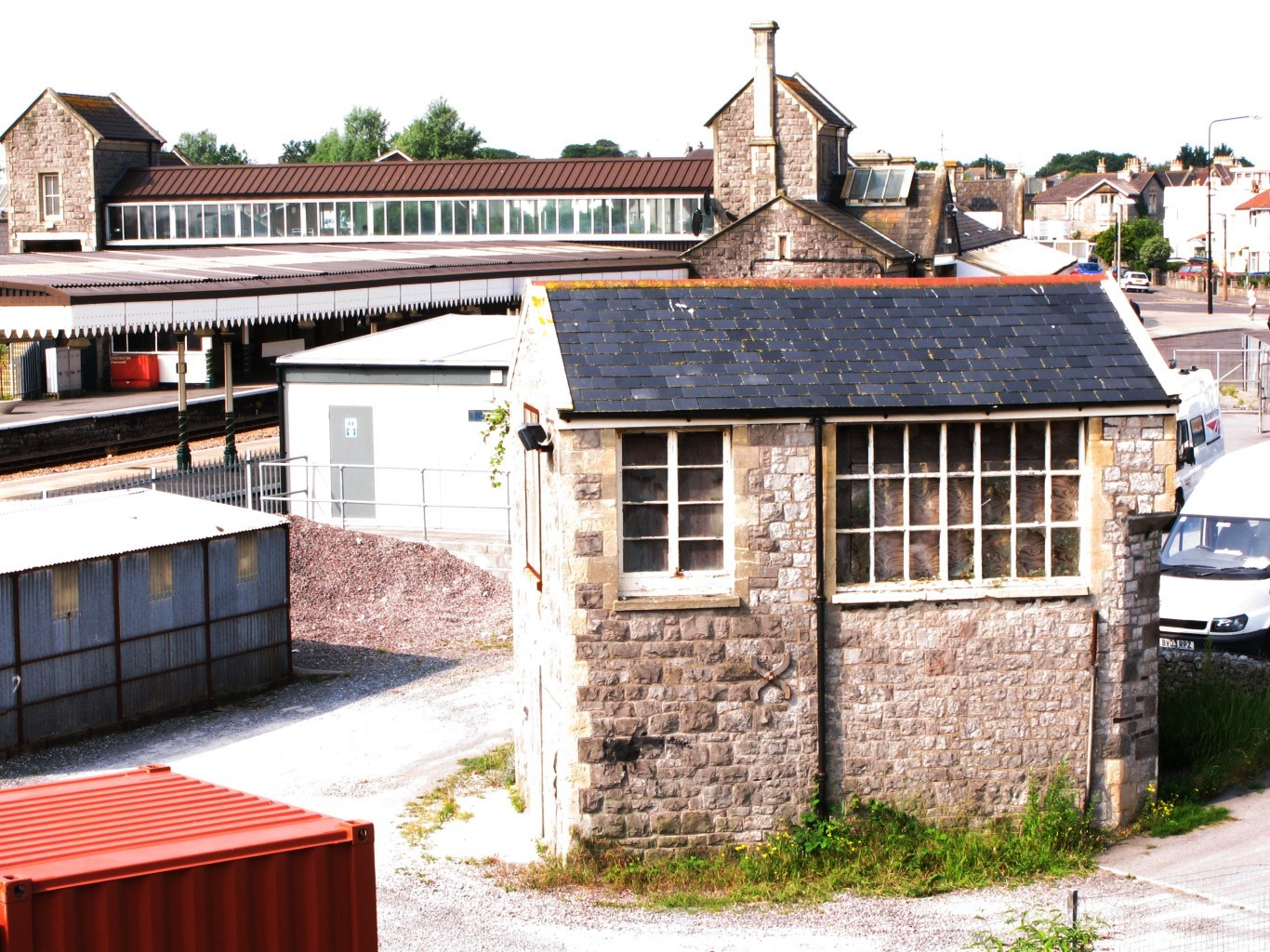
The 1866 signal box, seen in 2007

New goods facilities were opened on the junction side of Locking Road in 1862; the first goods dispatched were three truck loads of flower pots from the nearby Royal Pottery. On 20 July 1866, a large passenger station was opened adjacent to this, which allowed the closure of Brunel's 1841 terminus and the elimination of the Locking Road level crossing, although a second one across Devonshire Road remained. The branch was given a second track at the same time.

The new station again featured a train shed which covered the platforms. This was designed by the railway's engineer, Francis Fox, and was similar to the one built by him at about the same time at Exeter. The two platforms were supplemented by an excursion platform next to the goods depot. A new Bristol and Exeter Hotel was opened to serve the new station; it was later renamed The Town Crier. A signal box was provided and is now the earliest part of the station to survive. Although disused, it is believed to be the oldest signal box in Britain. It shows signs of a later extension to allow extra signal levers needed when the station was enlarged.

Until now, the branch had been part of Brunel's 7 ft (2,134 mm) broad gauge network, but on 1 July 1875 a third rail was added to each line which allowed 4 ft 8 1/2 in (1,435 mm) gauge trains to also reach the town. From 1879, no broad gauge trains were timetabled along the branch, although they continued to operate on the main line until 20 May 1892. In the meantime, the Bristol and Exeter Railway had been amalgamated into the Great Western Railway on 1 January 1876.

Preceding station	Disused railways	Following station
Weston Junction railway station	Bristol and Exeter Railway	Terminus

=== 1884 station ===
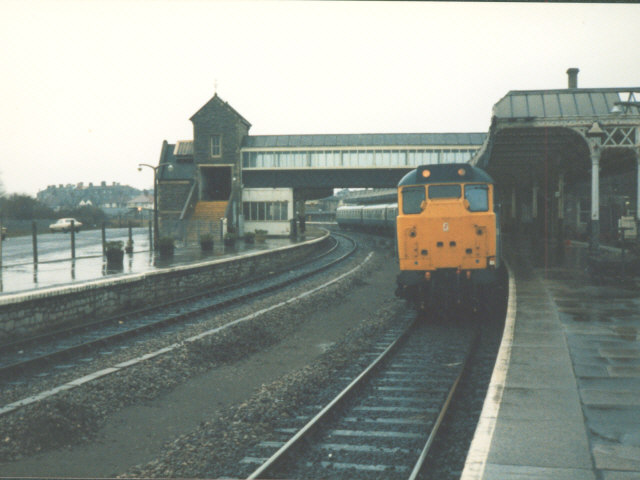
A Class 31 with a local service to Bristol before the canopy was cut back

The Bristol and Exeter Railway had obtained an act of parliament in 1875 to construct a new loop line through the town, which would allow trains to serve the town and then continue along the main line. No action was taken on this for many years which led to a planning blight along the proposed route. An 1880 court case forced the Great Western Railway to pay 5% interest to the affected property owners, which prompted the railway company into action.

The new line and station were opened on 1 March 1884. This was not the end of the old branch line as, for several years, a trolley was taken along the old tracks to collect mail from a postal train at the old Junction station each night. There was also a need to serve the town's gas works until 1972, and this was done along a short section of the old branch including the level crossing over Devonshire Road which had a roundabout built on it after the remainder of the branch became Winterstoke Road.

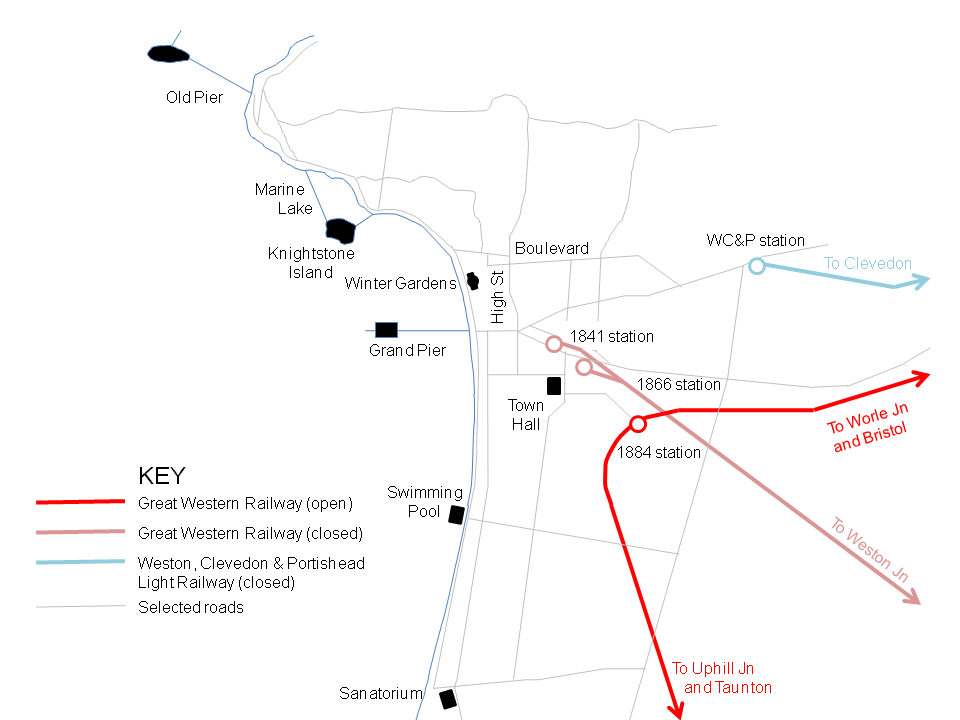
Map of the various stations in Weston

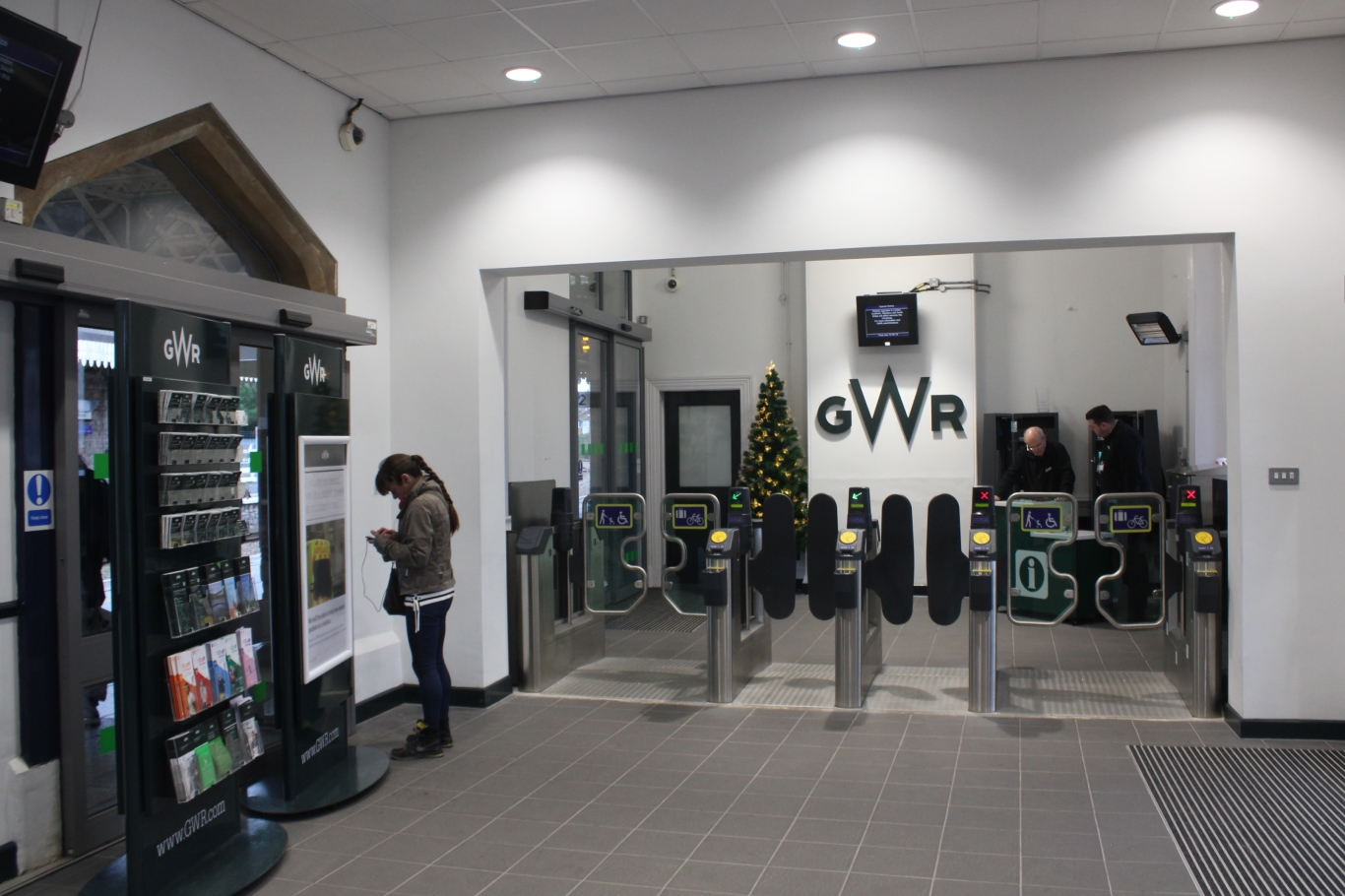
New ticket gates at the station in 2018.

The new station consisted of three platforms – two through platforms and an east-facing terminal bay – and was given hipped glass and iron canopies to keep the weather off passengers. A carriage siding was provided between the two main platforms and some more were built on land to the south of the station. Yet more sidings and an engine shed were on the north side of the line near the 1866 station which quickly found itself being reopened for goods traffic until final closure on 30 June 1966.

A new terminal station was opened in 1914 to deal with excursion traffic, being known as Locking Road station, while the main station was known as Weston-super-Mare General. In the 1950s as many as 30,000 excursionists could arrive at the station on a sunny bank holiday. Most came on trains from the Bristol area but some would travel further. For example, on Whit Monday in May 1956 trains came places such as from London Paddington, Wolverhampton, Cheltenham and Blaina. The platforms at Locking Road closed on 6 September 1964. The area once used by the 1866 and Locking Road stations, along with the sidings, has now been replaced by a Tesco store and a large car and coach park.

The loop line was singled on 31 January 1972. Most of the sidings were removed at this time and the bay platform 3 was reduced to the status of a siding. Two signal boxes – one at each end of the station – were closed and new colour light signals provided. These are controlled from a panel signal box at Bristol Temple Meads, but an emergency panel was provided in the station supervisor's office (which has since been removed) that can be used to control the line from Puxton Signal Box to Uphill Junction along both the loop line and avoiding line when there are problems with the normal signalling system.

The station itself was refurbished in 1986 with a new booking office. A few years later the canopy was renewed. This saw the removal of a few bays of the canopy at the east end of the station, and the replacement of the hipped canopy by a simpler modern design, although the original cast iron columns support this. Some hipped bays remain on the road side of the station entrance as a reminder of how it all once looked.

The 1866-built signal box was listed at Grade II by Historic England on 17 August 1987. The main station buildings were given the same status on 20 November 2017.

== Future ==
In September 2024, planning permission was granted for lifts to be installed at the station, enabling step-free interchange between the platforms.

== Services ==
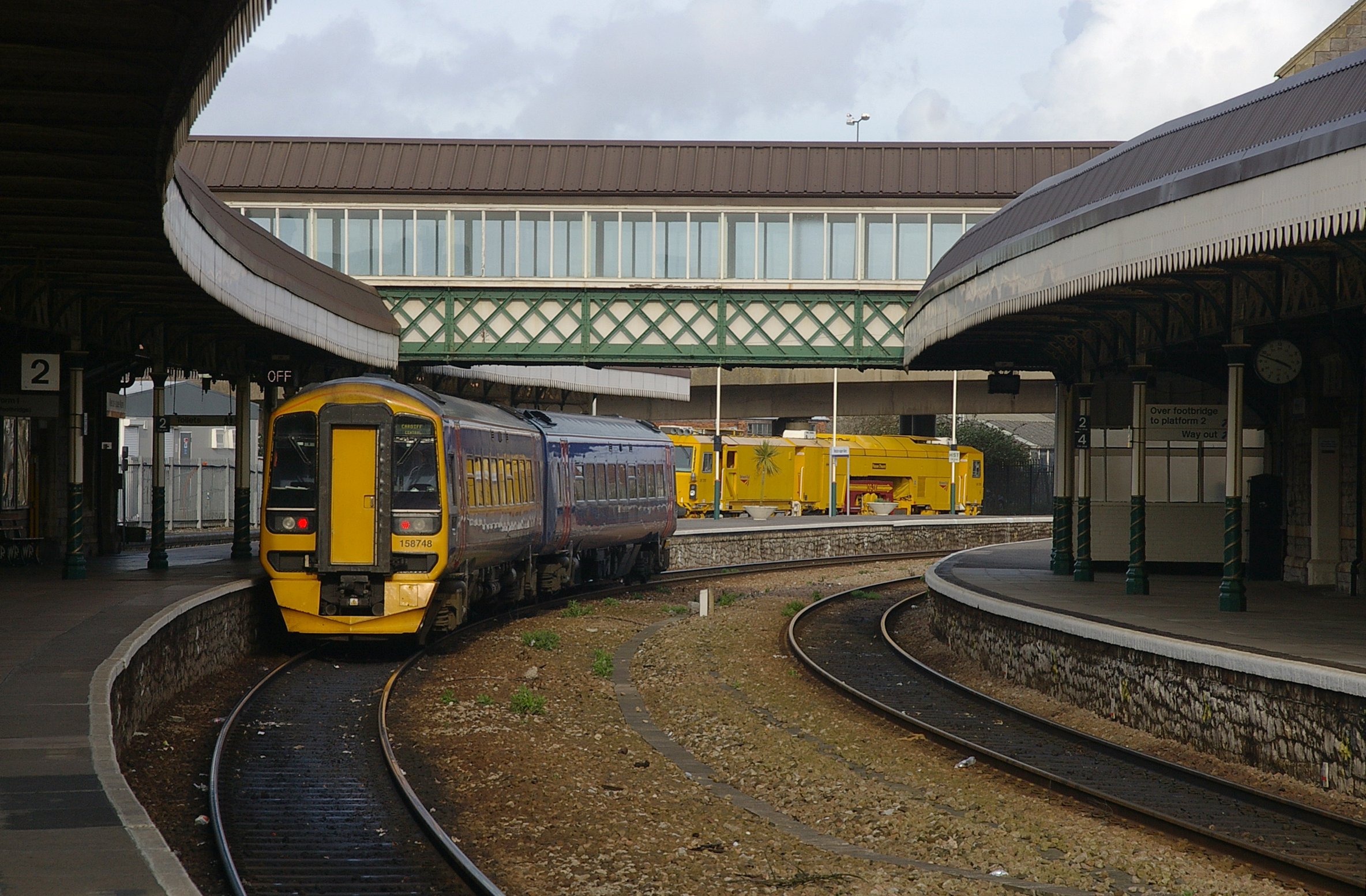
A Great Western Railway service to Cardiff Central departs from platform 2

The station is served by two train operating companies:

- Great Western Railway operates services to and from Severn Beach that call at most stations and semi-fast services calling at fewer stations between Cardiff Central and Taunton, some of which continue as far as Penzance. These two routes combine to give two trains each hour between Bristol Temple Meads and Weston-super-Mare for most of the day during the week. Additional services include through services to London Paddington.
- CrossCountry operates a once daily service in both directions between Manchester Piccadilly and Paignton with the exception of the southbound service on Sundays which operates between Edinburgh Waverley and Plymouth.

Buses operate from the railway station or nearby bus interchange to Bristol, Bristol Airport, Burnham-on-Sea, Portishead and Wells as well as most parts of the town and the surrounding villages.

Preceding station	National Rail	Following station
Bristol Temple Meads	CrossCountry (Scotland and North England – South West England)	Taunton
Worle	Great Western Railway (London/Cardiff to Taunton/Penzance)	Highbridge and Burnham
Weston Milton	Great Western Railway (Severn Beach to Weston-super-Mare)	Terminus

=== Future services ===
Go-op, a co-operatively owned train operating company, have proposed to operate services between Swindon, Taunton and Weston-super-Mare. In November 2024, the Office of Rail and Road gave conditional approval for the proposed services, subject to financial and rolling stock requirements, to begin no later than December 2026.

== See also ==
- Other railway stations in Weston-super-Mare
  - Weston Milton railway station
  - Worle railway station
- Disused railway stations (Bristol to Exeter Line)
  - Puxton and Worle railway station
  - Weston Junction railway station
  - Bleadon and Uphill railway station
- Weston, Clevedon and Portishead Railway
