= Worle railway station =

Railway station in Weston-super-Mare, England

Worle
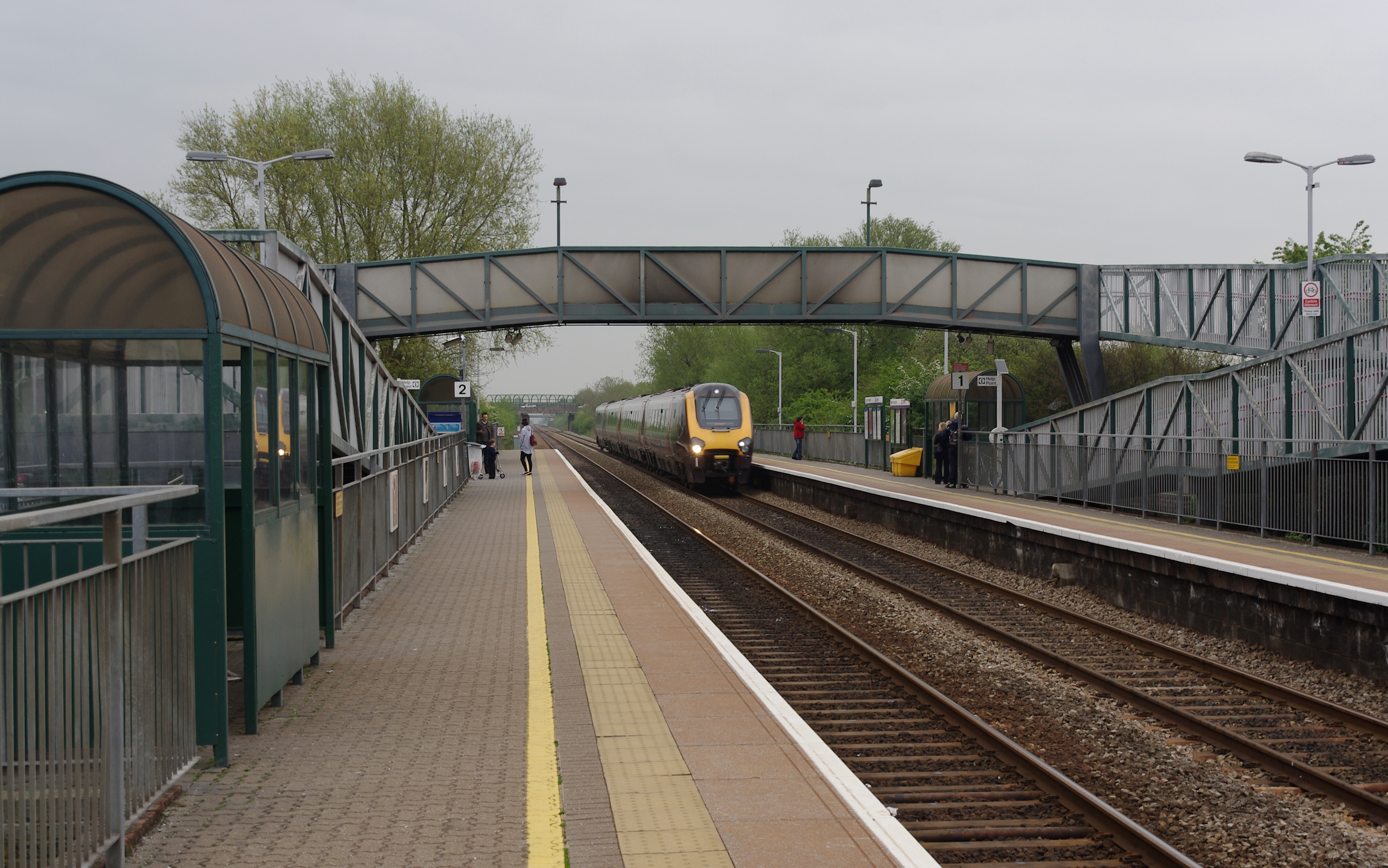
- A CrossCountry train passes west through Worle in 2012.

General information
- Location: Worle, North Somerset; England
- Coordinates: 51.3580°N 2.9094°W
- Grid reference: ST367624
- Manager: Great Western Railway
- Platforms: 2

Other information
- Station code: WOR
- Classification: DfT category F1

History
- Original company: British Rail

Key dates
- Opened: 24 September 1990

Passengers
- 2021/22: ▲0.232 million
- 2022/23: ▲0.319 million
- 2023/24: ▲0.346 million
- 2024/25: ▲0.398 million
- 2025/26: ▲0.438 million
Location
Notes
- Passenger statistics from the Office of Rail and Road

Worle railway station, on the Bristol to Exeter line, serves the Worle and West Wick suburbs of Weston-super-Mare, and the village of St Georges in North Somerset, England. It is 16 miles (26 km) west of Bristol Temple Meads railway station, and 134 miles (216 km) from London Paddington. Its three-letter station code is WOR. It was opened in 1990 by British Rail. The station, which has two platforms, is managed by Great Western Railway, which provides all train services at the station, mainly half hourly services between Severn Beach and Weston-super-Mare, and between Cardiff Central and Taunton. The station's car park was significantly expanded in 2013.

== History ==
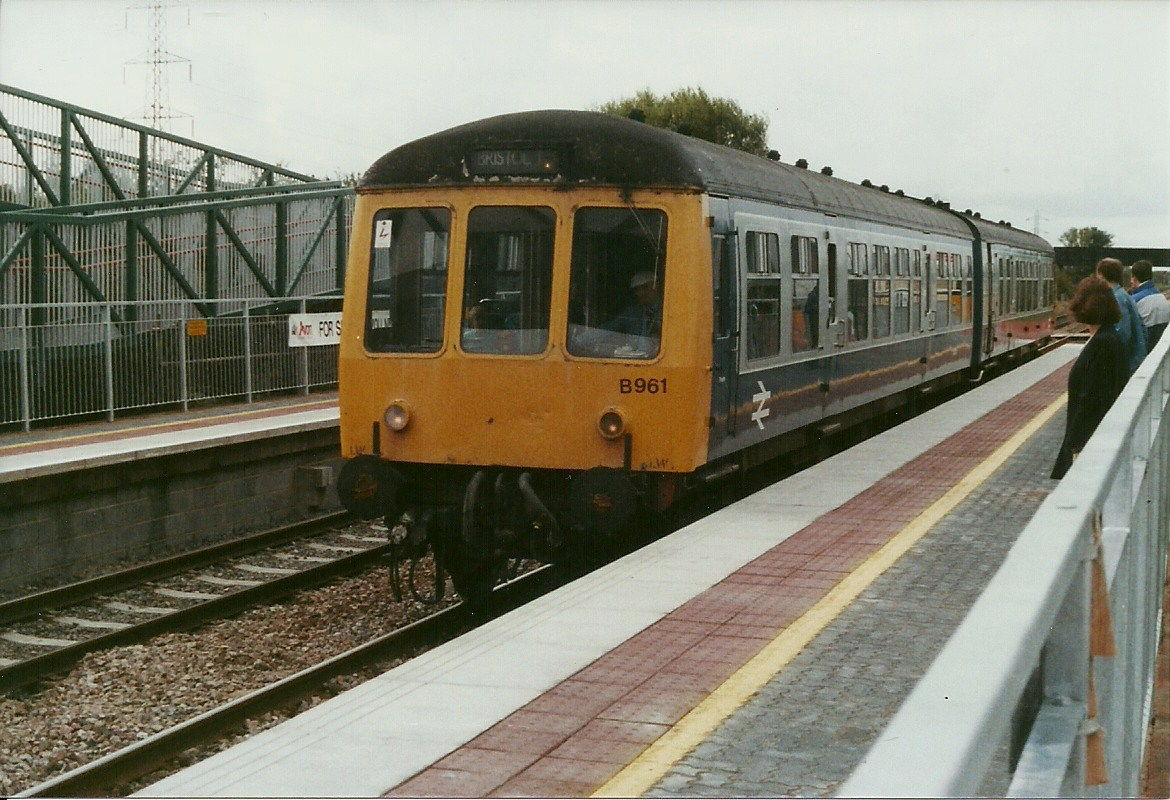
A Class 108 DMU at Worle on the day the station opened.

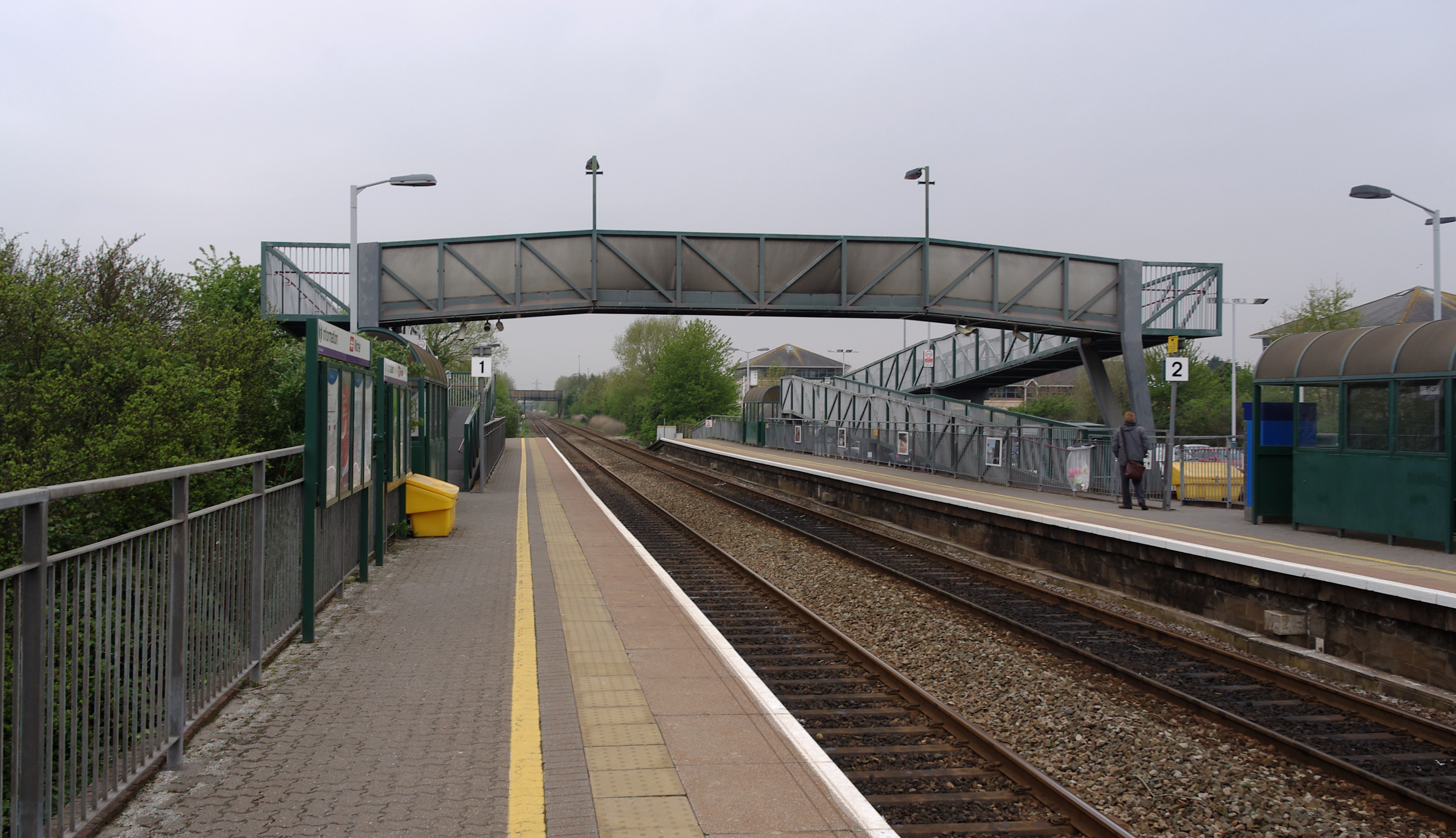
Looking west along the platforms.

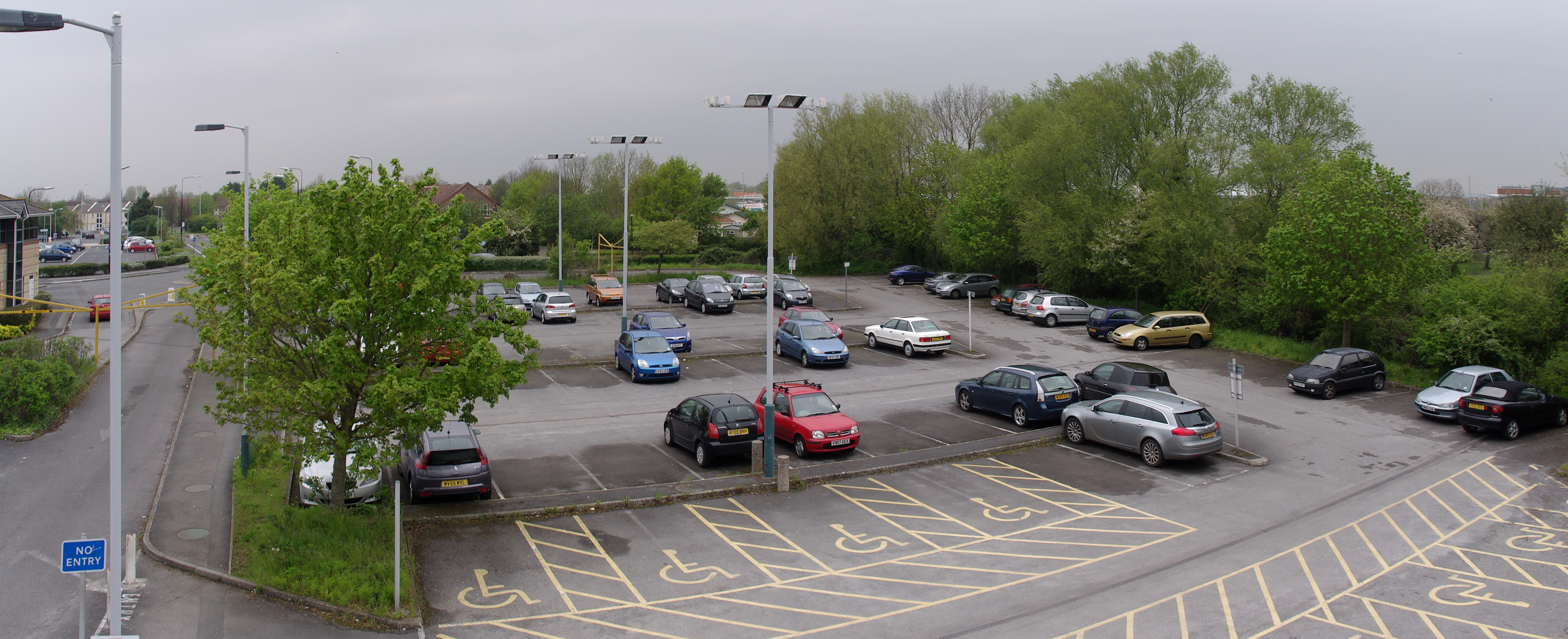
The station car park, seen here in 2012, was expanded in 2013 with 320 extra spaces and a bus interchange.

The line through Worle saw its first use on 14 June 1841, when the first section of the Bristol and Exeter Railway's (B&ER) main line between Bristol and Bridgwater was opened. The line, engineered by Isambard Kingdom Brunel, was built as 7 ft (2,134 mm) broad-gauge but was reconstructed as a mixed-gauge line to accommodate local 4 ft 8 1/2 in (1,435 mm)-gauge traffic by 1 June 1875. Services were operated by the Great Western Railway (GWR) on behalf of the B&ER until 1 May 1849. The B&ER then took over its own workings until the company was amalgamated into the GWR on 1 January 1876. Broad-gauge trains ceased operation on 20 May 1892. When the railways were nationalised by the Transport Act 1947, the line became part of the Western Region of British Railways.

The modern Worle railway station is the fourth station to serve Worle. The first station, 47 chains (0.59 mi; 0.95 km) east of the modern station, was opened in 1841 as Banwell and was known as Worle from 1869 to 1884, then as Puxton and Worle from 1922 until closure in 1964. From 1884 to 1922, there was a station called Worle on the loop line to Weston-super-Mare, 60 chains (0.75 mi; 1.2 km) west of the modern station. There was also a station on the nearby Weston, Clevedon and Portishead Light Railway, which was known as Worle from 1897 to 1913, then as Worle (Moor Lane) until 1917, and as Worle Town until closure in 1940.

The station at Worle was developed as a joint initiative between British Rail and Avon County Council. It cost £700,000 and was built using lightweight construction materials due to being sited on marshy ground. The station was opened on 24 September 1990 by Councillor Betty Perry, the chair of Avon Council. The first train was a westbound Regional Railways service, operated by Class 150 Sprinter DMU 150270. All services were local ones – no scheduled intercity services would call at Worle until 2007.

Upon the privatisation of British Rail in 1997, services were franchised to Wales & West, which was in turn succeeded in 2001 by Wessex Trains, an arm of National Express. The Wessex franchise was amalgamated with the Great Western franchise into the Greater Western franchise from 2006, and responsibility passed to First Great Western, a subsidiary company of FirstGroup, which was later rebranded Great Western Railway. Great Western Railway services to and from London Paddington started calling at Worle in 2007. Due to the trains being longer than the platforms, a selective door opening system was used to prevent passengers opening doors which were not adjacent to the platform.

In 2012, plans to enhance the station's facilities were approved by the Department for Transport. The works, part of a large transport scheme called the Weston Package, included construction of a new council run car park containing 320 spaces on the South side of the station, better facilities for cyclists and motorcyclists, and a bus interchange. A bus link to the nearby Queensway retail park was also included in the scheme. The expansion took over unused land to the east and south of the station, and required the removal of slowworms and grass snakes to a nature reserve in Cheddar. The work, which started in April 2013, was completed later the same year with the new car park opening on 3 September 2013.

Worle has had a large number of incidents of railway vandalism and antisocial behaviour, and the stretch of line through Worle is considered one of the most vandalised in the United Kingdom – obstructions have been left on the line and stones have being thrown at railway staff. There have been several incidents of train guards being attacked by passengers who refused to pay their fares, including one incident where the guard was dragged from the train and knocked to the ground. Vandals have also damaged the station's ticket machines, attacked passengers and slashed the tyres of cars parked at the station.

Preceding station	Historical railways	Following station
Yatton	Regional Railways; Bristol to Exeter line (1990–1997)	Weston Milton
Yatton	Wales & West; Bristol to Exeter line (1997–2001)	Weston Milton
Yatton	Wessex Trains; Bristol to Exeter line (2001–2006)	Weston Milton

== Description ==
Worle railway station is located in the east of Weston-super-Mare, North Somerset, serving the suburbs of Worle and West Wick and the village of St Georges. The surrounding area is primarily residential, but with several commercial developments, including the Worle Parkway office development next to the station. The station is located just off the B3440 Bristol Road, near the M5 motorway junction 21 and the A370. There is a car park on the north, east and south sides of the station. The station is on the Bristol to Exeter line, 16 miles 11 chains (16.14 mi; 26.0 km) from Bristol Temple Meads and 134 miles 42 chains (134.53 mi; 216.5 km) from London Paddington (via Chippenham). (Note: Railways in the United Kingdom are, for historical reasons, measured in miles and chains. There are 80 chains to the mile.) It is the fifth station along the line from Bristol Temple Meads. The station is oriented along an axis at 57 degrees to the meridian.

There are two platforms, on either side of the two tracks through the station. The southern platform, platform 1, serves westbound trains (towards Weston-super-Mare and Taunton); the northern platform, platform 2, serves eastbound trains (towards Bristol). Both platforms are 100 metres (110 yd) long. The line through the station has a speed limit of 100 miles per hour (160 km/h), and is not electrified. Access between the platforms is via an open footbridge with long, sloped ramps for step-free access. Ticket machines are available, and a small ticket office operates during the weekday morning peak, but the station is otherwise unstaffed. Help points are provided, allowing travellers to ask questions of a call centre. There are metal and glass waiting shelters on both platforms – two on the eastbound platform and one on the westbound. Most recently, improved lighting and CCTV has been provided and for the first time since construction, electronic train arrival boards with automated voice announcements have been provided on both platforms and also a silent, less detailed digital arrivals / departures board adjacent to the ticket office.

Forty-nine chains (0.61 mi; 0.99 km) west of the station is Worle Junction, where the single-track loop line to Weston-super-Mare diverges from the main line towards Taunton. The next station west along the loop is Weston Milton, the next station west on the main line is Highbridge & Burnham. The next station east of Worle is Yatton.

== Services ==
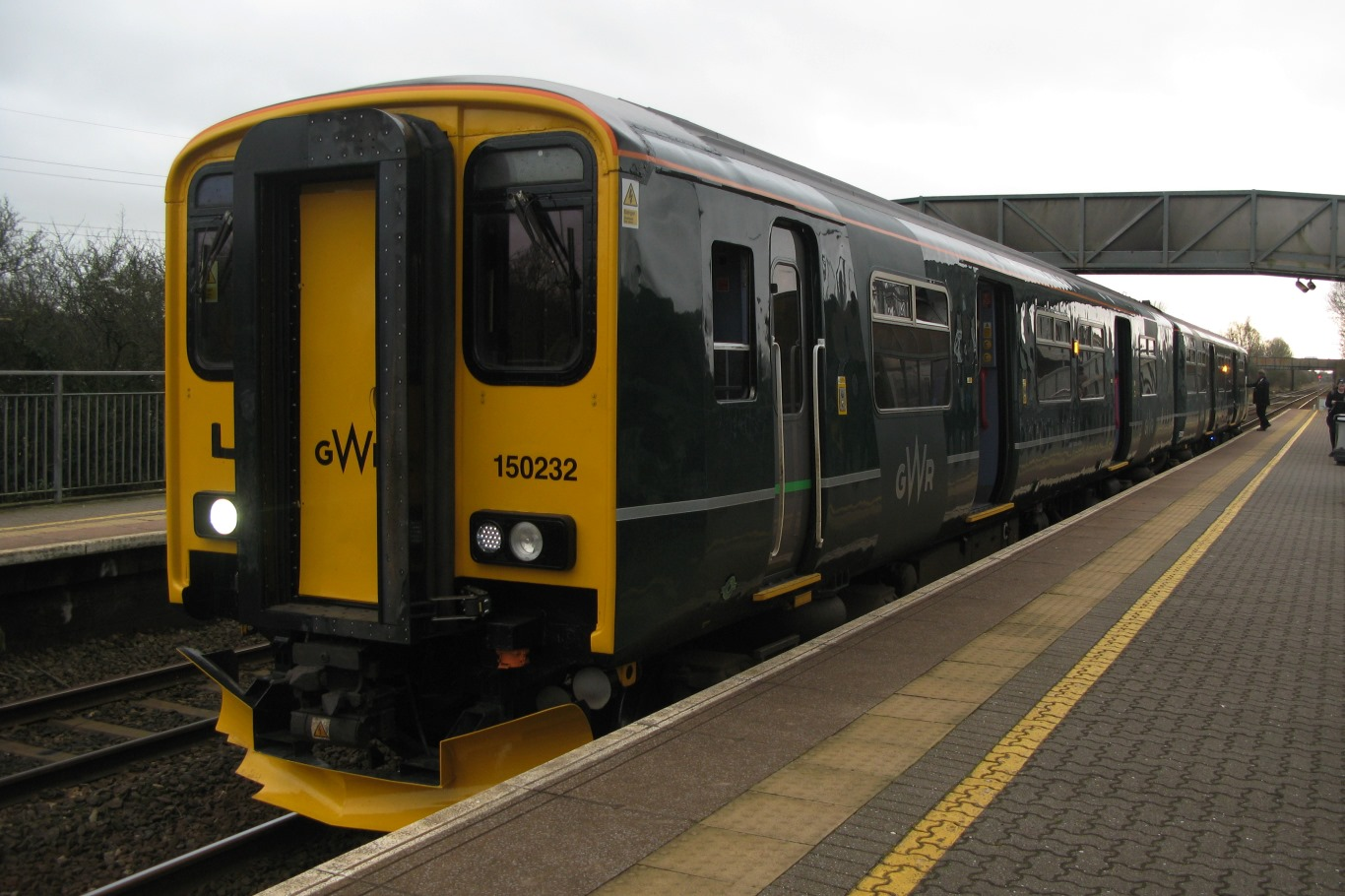
A Great Western Railway service to Bristol and Cardiff.

The station is managed by Great Western Railway, who operate all rail services from the station. The basic service consists of two trains in each direction per hour: one is the Severn Beach to Weston-super-Mare service, calling at all stations; the second is the faster Cardiff Central to Taunton service, non-stop between Bristol Temple Meads and Nailsea & Backwell, Worle and Weston-super-Mare. Some westbound services are extended to Exeter St Davids or Plymouth. The typical journey time to Bristol Temple Meads is 25 minutes, to Weston-super-Mare is 8 minutes.

Services between London Paddington and Weston-super-Mare call at Worle in the early morning and evening, running non-stop between Bristol Temple Meads and Nailsea & Backwell. From Monday to Friday there are four morning services and one evening service to London, with seven services from London, all in the evening. One service from London is extended to Taunton, and another to Penzance. Saturday sees two services to London, all in the morning, and three services from London, all in the evening – one is extended to Exeter St Davids, another to Plymouth. There are five services to and six from London on Sundays, spread throughout the day, with one service extended to Taunton and another to Exeter. All trains call at Weston-super-Mare westbound, and at Yatton and Nailsea & Backwell, but not all stop at Weston Milton. The typical journey time to London is 2 hours 15 minutes.

CrossCountry services pass through the station throughout the day, operating services between Cornwall and Scotland, but do not stop. Occasional Great Western Railway intercity services between London and Weston-super-Mare or Taunton and Exeter also pass through non-stop.

Preceding station	National Rail	Following station
Yatton	Great Western Railway; Severn Beach–Weston-super-Mare	Weston Milton
Yatton	Great Western Railway; London Paddington–Taunton	Weston-super-Mare
Yatton	Great Western Railway; Cardiff Central–Penzance	Weston-super-Mare

== Future ==
Worle is on the Weston-super-Mare/Yate corridor, one of the main axes of the Greater Bristol Metro, a rail transport plan which aims to enhance transport capacity in the Bristol area. The group Friends of Suburban Bristol Railways supports the electrification of the line through Nailsea & Backwell, as did former MP for Weston-super-Mare John Penrose.
