= Backwell House =

Coordinates: 51.4191°N 2.7191°W

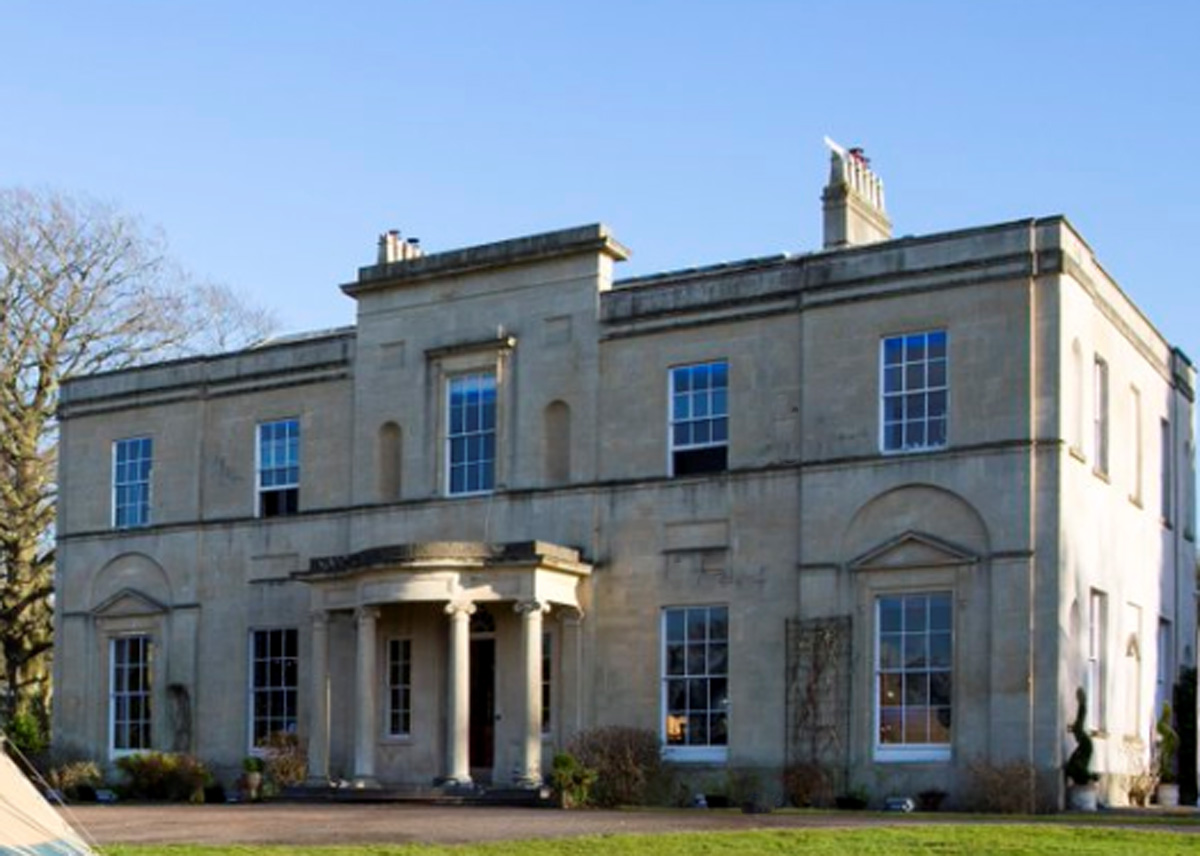
- The front of Backwell House
- Type: Country house
- Location: Backwell
- Area: North Somerset
- Built: around 1813
- Architect: Thomas Keedwell
- Architectural style(s): Georgian
- Owner: Hobbs family

Listed Building – Grade II
- Official name: Backwell House
- Designated: 11 October 1961
- Reference no.: 1129820

Listed Building – Grade II
- Official name: Gates and Piers, 50 Yards North of Backwell House
- Designated: 16 March 1984
- Reference no.: 1137537

Backwell House, in Backwell, Somerset, England is a house of historical significance and is listed on the English Heritage Register. The house and entrance gates are also Grade II listed buildings. It was built in about 1813 by a prominent lawyer and was the residence of several notable people until about 1860. From then it became the home of the Robinson family who were famous cricketers remembered by people such as W. G. Grace. It was operated as a boutique hotel from 2016 to 2022.

== Early residents ==
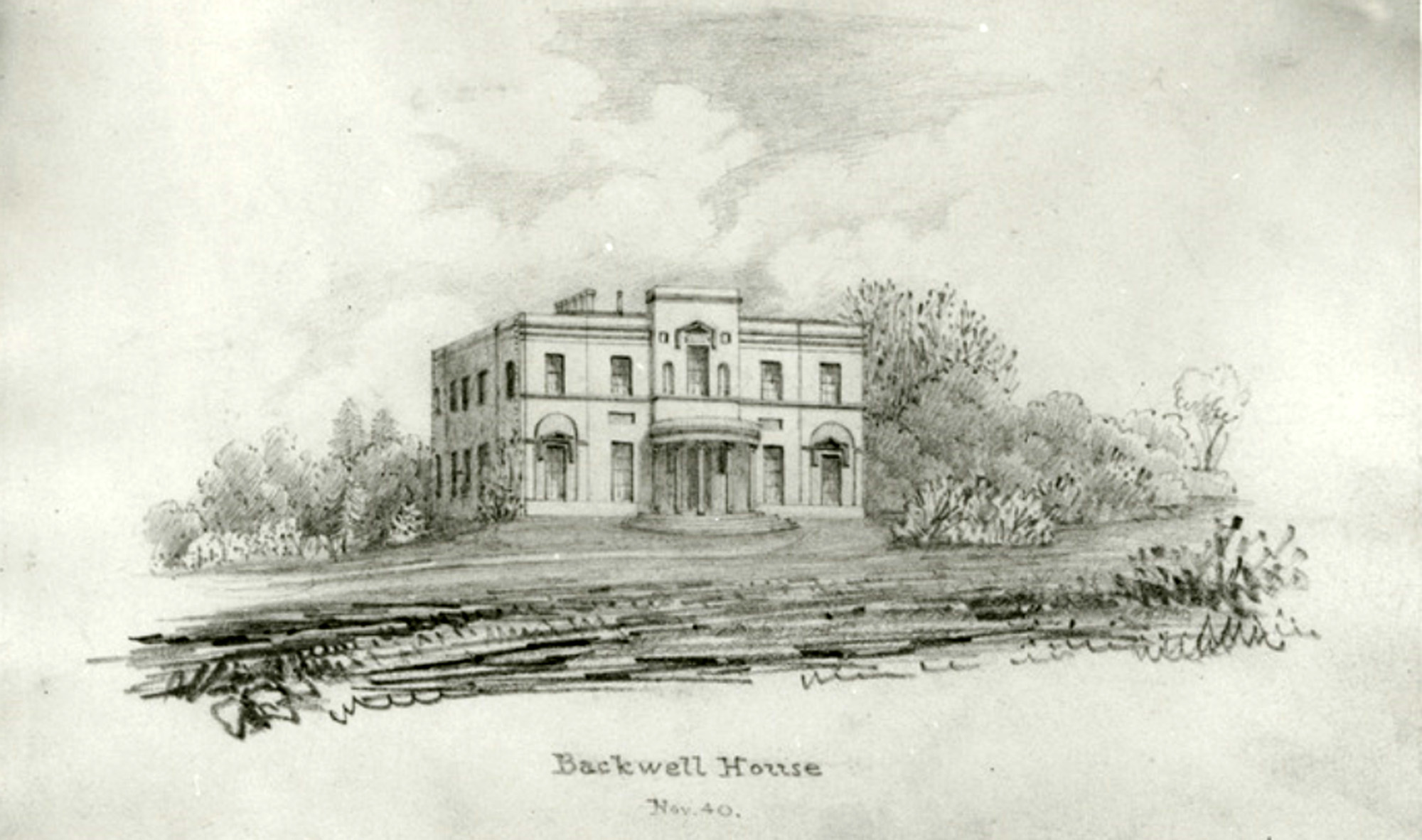
Sketch of Backwell House in 1840

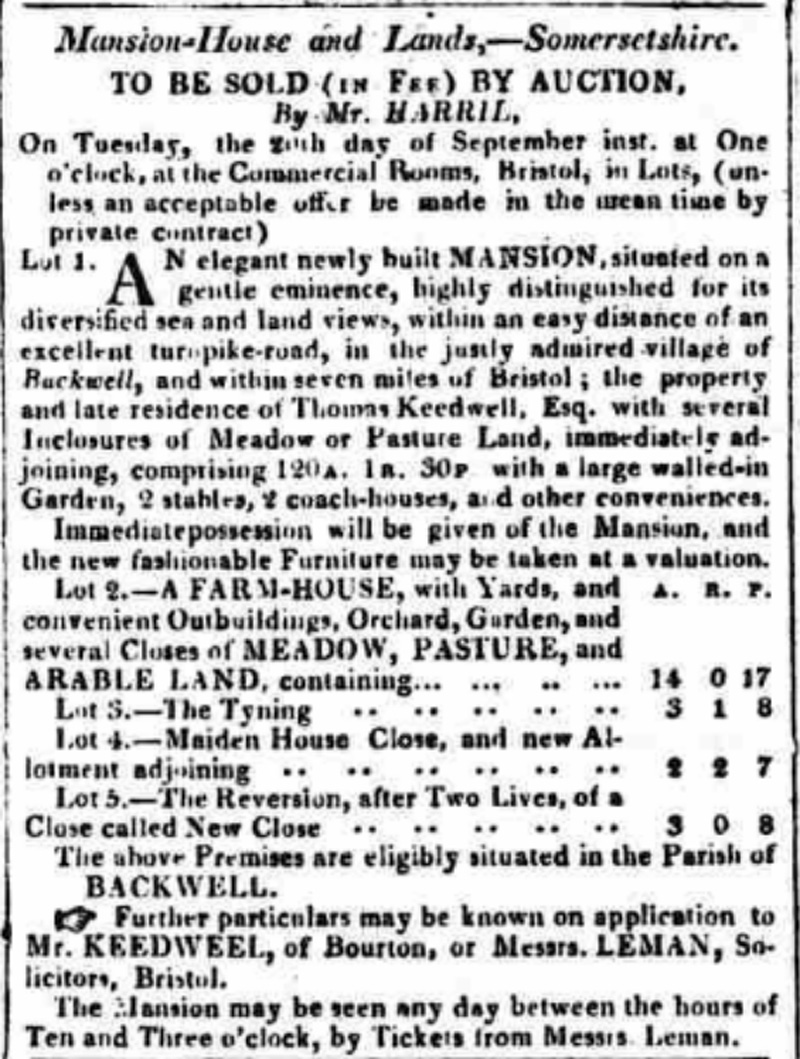
Sale notice for Backwell House 1814.

Thomas Keedwell, a lawyer from Long Ashton, built Backwell House in about 1813. Shortly after it was advertised for sale in 1814. The advertisement stated that it was an estate of about 120 acres (49 ha) and described the house in the following terms: “An elegant newly built mansion situated on a gentle eminence highly distinguished for its diversified sea and land views. It has a large walled garden, two stables, two coach houses and other conveniences.”

The property was bought by the Sparrow family from Flax Bourton. This family lived in a large house called “The Castle” and in 1814 when Backwell House was sold the owner was Reverend James Sparrow so it was he who bought the house. He used it as a rental property and when he died in 1829 the house passed to his only son James Sparrow (1797-1864). James held a commission in the 6th Dragoons and when he retired he came to live on the family estate in Flax Bourton. His obituary stated that “he lived the quiet life of a country gentleman exercising hospitality to his friends and never losing an opportunity of doing practical kindnesses to his poorer neighbours and dependents.”

While he owned the House it was rented by several notable people including the Reverend Andrew Daubeny (1768-1836) Lady Letitia Le Poer Trench between 1845 and 1855 with her daughter Fanny and her husband Major Robert Edward Burrowes. Major General William Sage was the tenant after this until 1861. While it was being rented it was sketched by Benjamin Herschel Babbage who at this time was a young engineer who liked to sketch scenes in the English countryside. His sketch is shown

In 1861 James placed a sale notice in the newspapers which described the house in detail and said that the property contained 42 acres (17 ha). It was bought by the Robinson family.

== The Robinson family ==
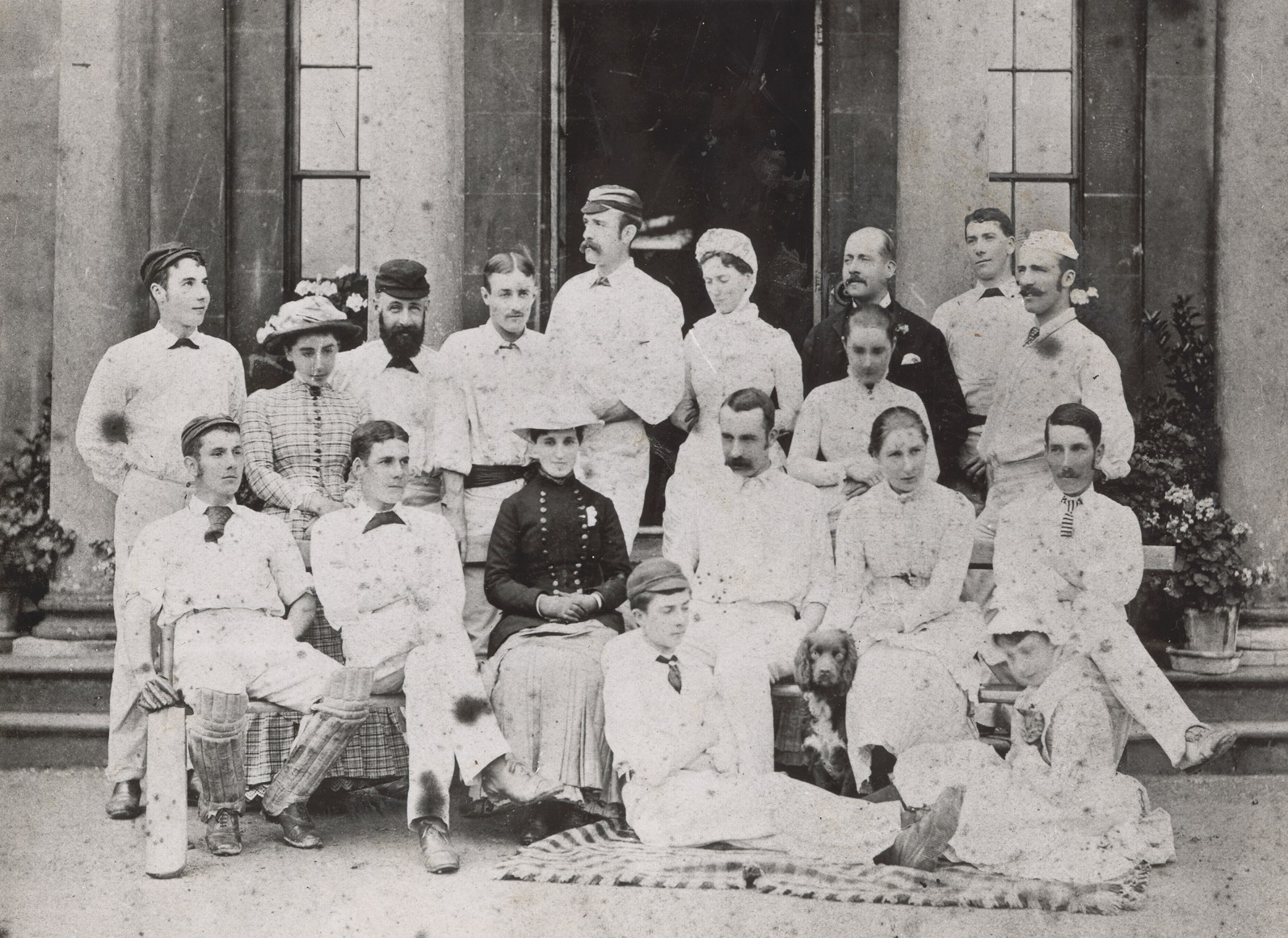
The Robinson Cricket Team in 1884. (Alfred is in the back row second from the right.)

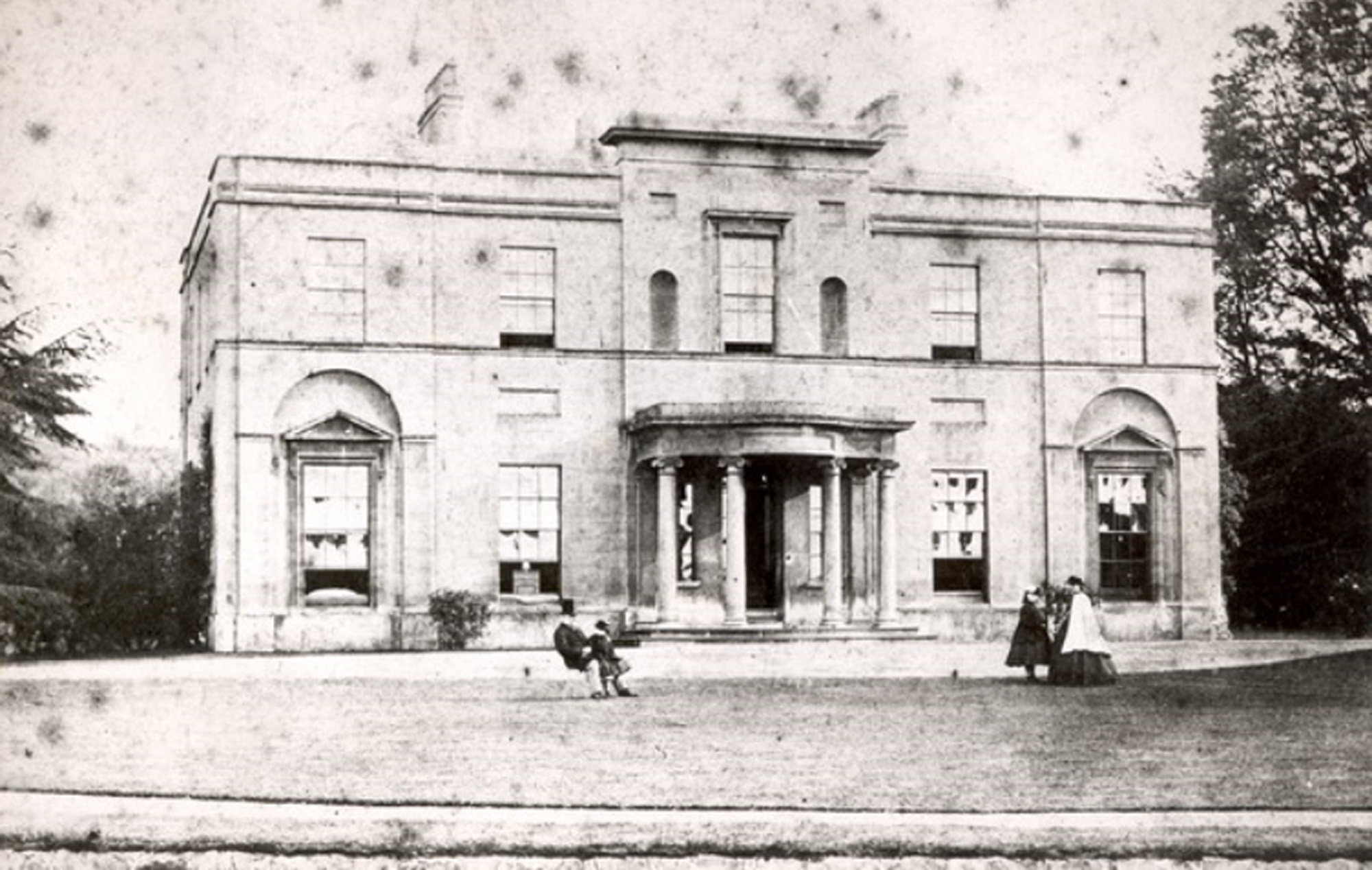
Backwell House in 1864.

The house was bought in 1861 by John Robinson (1820-1886) who was the son of Edward Robinson (1791-1870) a paper manufacturer. John was born in 1820 in Overbury, Worcestershire. In 1849 he married Sarah Ann Potter (1829-1881) who was the daughter of Joseph Potter. The couple had twelve children, six sons and six daughters. John founded his own firm called John Robinson and Co which manufactured seed oil.

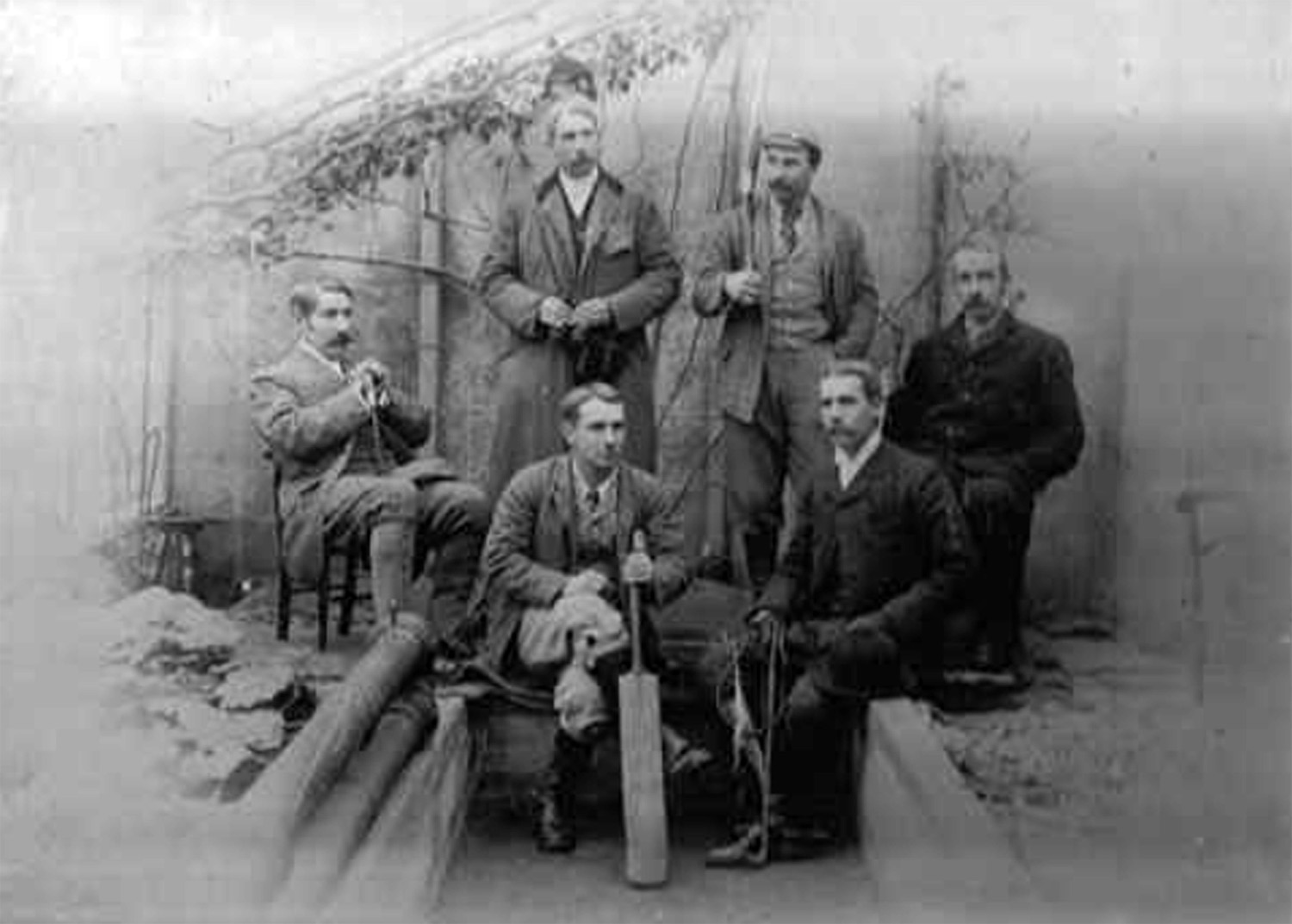
The Robinson brothers who lived in Backwell House circa 1900. Back row Cresens, Alfred, Edgar and Walter. Front row Theodore and Sidney.

His six sons were keen cricketers and in 1878 the eldest son Alfred Roberts Robinson (1856-1949) received an invitation to bring a team to play West Town on August Bank Holiday. He recruited his five brothers Walter, Edgar, Sidney, Crescens and Theodore who were still living at Backwell House and five of his first cousins to form a team consisting entirely of Robinsons. The team became known as the Backwell House XI and thereafter for the next 87 years until 1964 the Robinson team which was always made up of descendants of the first team played a match on the August Bank Holiday.

The Robinson team also played other matches and one of the most famous was in August 1891 when they played the Grace family which on this day included the famous cricketer W. G. Grace. Grace was in fact related to the Robinsons as some members of the team were his brothers in law. Grace mentions this fact and describes the 1891 match in his book "W.G.", Cricketing Reminiscences and Personal Recollections”. He says:

"Another interesting reminiscence is the match we had down in the West Country between the Graces and the Robinsons. My brother E. M (Edward Mills Grace) married a Miss Robinson, a member of the well-known Bristol family. The Robinsons played cricket and as a result of a little friendly chuff between the two families a match was arranged between eleven Graces and eleven Robinsons."

When John Robinson died in 1886 Backwell House was inherited by his eldest son Alfred Roberts Robinson who lived here with his family for the next 63 years until his death in 1949. Alfred was born in 1856 in Gloucester. He joined his father’s oil seed business and this firm later became British Oil and Cake Mills Ltd. Alfred was a Managing Director of this larger company.

In 1892 he married Jessie Gotch (1859-1936) who was the daughter of Thomas Henry Gotch, a banker from Kettering. The couple had two children, one daughter and one son. Alfred maintained an active interest in cricket all of his life and in 1938 he was presented with a cup with the inscription "1878-1938. Presented to Alfred R. Robinson by members and relations of the Robinson family to commemorate the Diamond Jubilee of the family cricket matches which he promoted and has encouraged for 60 years."

== Present day ==
The house was redesigned as a boutique hotel and bar by the Hobbs Family. The hotel closed in 2022.
