= Crescens Robinson =

English cricketer

Personal information
- Full name: Crescens James Robinson
- Born: 21 May 1864; Gloucester, England
- Died: 8 June 1941 (aged 77); Chelsea, London, England
- Batting: Right-handed
- Role: Batsman
- Relatives: Brother Theodore, cousin Arthur

Domestic team information
- Years: Team
- 1885–96: Somerset
- First-class debut: 10 August 1885 Somerset v Surrey
- Last First-class: 30 May 1896 Somerset v Sussex

Career statistics
Competition	First-class
Matches	32
Runs scored	547
Batting average	12.72
100s/50s	–/1
Top score	55
Balls bowled	10
Wickets	–
Bowling average	–
5 wickets in innings	–
10 wickets in match	–
Best bowling	0/3
Catches/stumpings	19/–
- Source: CricketArchive, 18 August 2010

Crescens James Robinson (21 May 1864 – 8 June 1941) played first-class cricket for Somerset in 31 matches from 1885 to 1896. He was born in Gloucester and died at Chelsea in London.

== Family and background ==
Robinson was a member of an entrepreneurial family who had interests in paper-making and printing in Bristol and London and in a wide range of goods in Singapore. The family company of E. S. & A. Robinson owned a large printing and paper-bag manufacturing site at Bedminster in Bristol. Crescens Robinson's unusual name was a family name: his uncle Crescens had a firm called "Crescens Robinson & Co" in Islington, London, which acted as an agent for his uncle Philip who was the founder of Robinson & Co in Singapore and later became a lithographic printing company which specialised in fine printing of posters, with London Transport among its customers.

The extensive Robinson family had estates at Flax Bourton and Backwell, near Nailsea, south of Bristol, and in 1879 Crescens was part of a team of "Eleven Robinsons" that played a match against the Backwell Cricket Club at the Flax Bourton ground. This event was repeated in various forms until 1964 and included a match against an all Grace team in 1891. The Eleven Robinsons consisted of Crescens and five of his brothers, augmented by five cousins, all descended from Edward Robinson and directly related to Elisha Smith Robinson, Crescens' most prosperous uncle. Apart from Crescens, two others of the Robinson Eleven graduated to first-class cricket: cousin Arthur played three matches for Gloucestershire, while Crescens' brother Theodore also played a few times for Somerset.

== Cricket career ==
Crescens Robinson made his first-class debut for Somerset in a crushing defeat by Surrey towards the end of the 1885 season, after which Somerset lost its first-class cricket status for five seasons. Robinson, a right-handed middle- or lower-order batsman, played during the years of second-class cricket from 1886 to the triumphs of 1890, when a winning streak in matches against leading teams opened up a new set of fixtures for Somerset of sufficient depth to enable the county to qualify for first-class status again. Robinson was then a regular member of the teams in both 1891 and 1892, though he was scarcely prolific. Played only as a batsman, he made only one score of more than 50 in the two seasons, an innings of 55 made batting at No 9 in the match against Kent in July 1891.

Robinson did not play first-class cricket after the 1892 season until he reappeared in two Somerset matches in 1896, but he made little impact in those, and they were the final games of his cricket career.
