= Theodore Robinson (cricketer) =

English cricketer

Personal information
- Full name: Theodore Robinson
- Born: 16 February 1866; Beaminster, Dorset, England
- Died: 4 October 1959 (aged 93); Backwell, Somerset, England
- Batting: Right-handed
- Bowling: Right-arm medium pace
- Role: Batsman
- Relatives: Brother Crescens, cousin Arthur

Domestic team information
- Years: Team
- 1884–94: Somerset
- First-class debut: 7 August 1884 Somerset v Hampshire
- Last First-class: 12 June 1894 Somerset v Kent

Career statistics
Competition	First-class
Matches	10
Runs scored	152
Batting average	8.44
100s/50s	–/1
Top score	57
Balls bowled	144
Wickets	2
Bowling average	43.00
5 wickets in innings	–
10 wickets in match	–
Best bowling	2/20
Catches/stumpings	3/–
- Source: CricketArchive, 21 August 2010

Theodore Robinson (16 February 1866 – 4 October 1959) played first-class cricket for Somerset in 10 matches between 1884 and 1894. He was born at Beaminster in Dorset and died at Backwell, Somerset.

== Family and background ==
Robinson was a member of an entrepreneurial family who had interests in paper-making and printing in Bristol and London and in a wide range of goods in Singapore. The family company of E. S. & A. Robinson owned a large printing and paper-bag manufacturing site at Bedminster in Bristol.

The extensive Robinson family had estates at Flax Bourton and Backwell, south of Bristol, and at the age of 13 in 1879, Theodore was part of a team of "Eleven Robinsons" that played a match against the Backwell Cricket Club at the Flax Bourton ground. This event was repeated in various forms until 1964 and included a match against an all Grace team in 1891. The Eleven Robinsons consisted of Theodore and five of his brothers, augmented by five cousins, all descended from Edward Robinson and directly related to Elisha Smith Robinson, Theodore's most prosperous uncle. Apart from Theodore, two others of the Robinson Eleven graduated to first-class cricket: cousin Arthur played three matches for Gloucestershire, while Theodore's brother Crescens Robinson also played for Somerset.

== Cricket career ==
Robinson played as a right-handed batsman and an occasional right-arm medium pace bowler for Somerset. In his first match in 1884, against Hampshire, he made 57 in a Somerset reply of 254 to a Hampshire total of 645, which was the second-highest score in first-class matches in England to that date. This remained his highest score. Between 1889 and 1891, he played in second-class matches for Glamorgan, but he reappeared for Somerset in occasional matches from 1892 to 1894, though with little success.

== 1908 Summer Olympics ==
Robinson competed at the 1908 Summer Olympics in London. Robinson entered the men's double York round event in 1908, taking 7th place with 647 points.

== After cricket ==
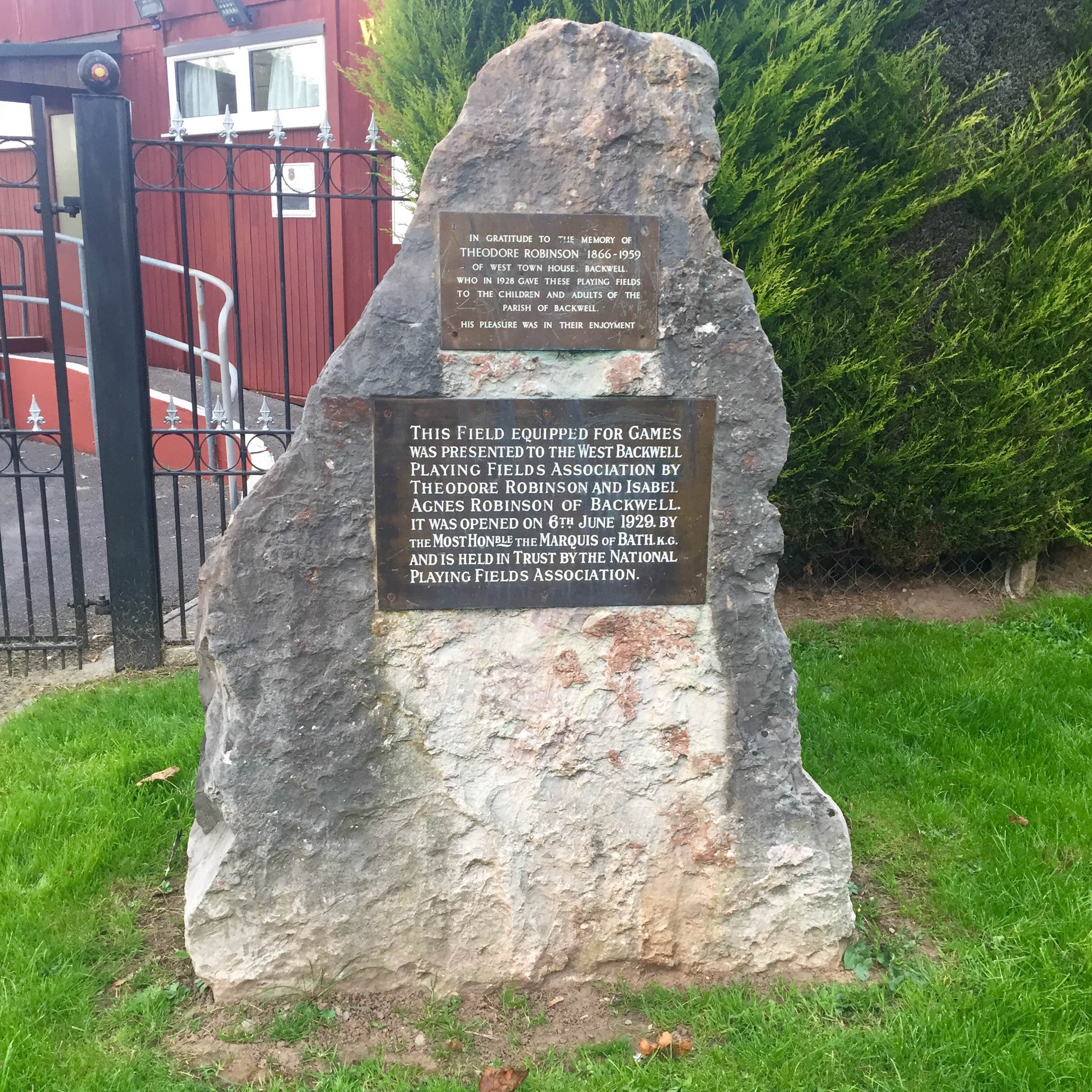
A stone in Backwell Playing Fields which is dedicated to Robinson

Theodore Robinson continued to live in Backwell, and he and his sister donated land in 1929 to the village for use as playing fields, with further donations in 1932 and 1945. There are several pictures of Theodore Robinson at the opening ceremony in 1929 and later on the Backwell Playing Fields website.
