= Strawberry tree =

Strawberry tree is a common name for:

- Arbutus, a genus in the family Ericaceae with edible red fruits
  - Arbutus unedo, the tree from which the genus Arbutus derives its name
  - Arbutus andrachne, known as Greek strawberry tree
- Calycophyllum candidissimum, in the family Calycophyllum
- Cornus capitata, a species of dogwood known as Himalayan strawberry-tree
- Muntingia calabura, in the family Malvaceae, native to the American tropics
- Myrica rubra, in the family Myricaceae, referred to as the Chinese strawberry tree

== Other uses ==
- Strawberry Tree (solar energy device)
- Strawberry Tree (national symbol of Italy)
- The Strawberry Tree, a 2011 Spanish-language experimental film

== See also ==
- Strawberries and Cream Tree, a graft hybrid cherry tree
