= Strawberries and cream =

Strawberries and cream can refer to:

- a traditional English dessert made with strawberries
- the inedible fungus Hydnellum peckii
- Strawberries and Cream (album), the second studio album by American comedy rock duo Ninja Sex Party
- "Strawberries and Cream" (The Mentalist), a two-part season finale for the television series The Mentalist
- Strawberries and Cream Tree in Somerset, UK
