= Backwell School =

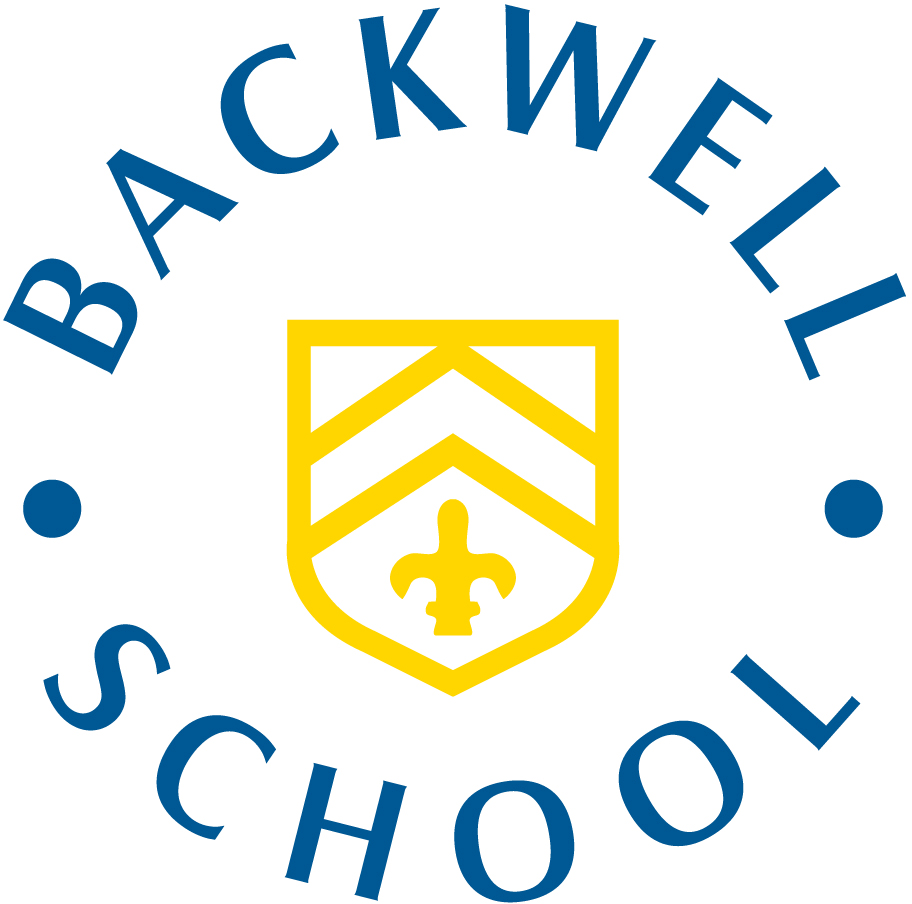

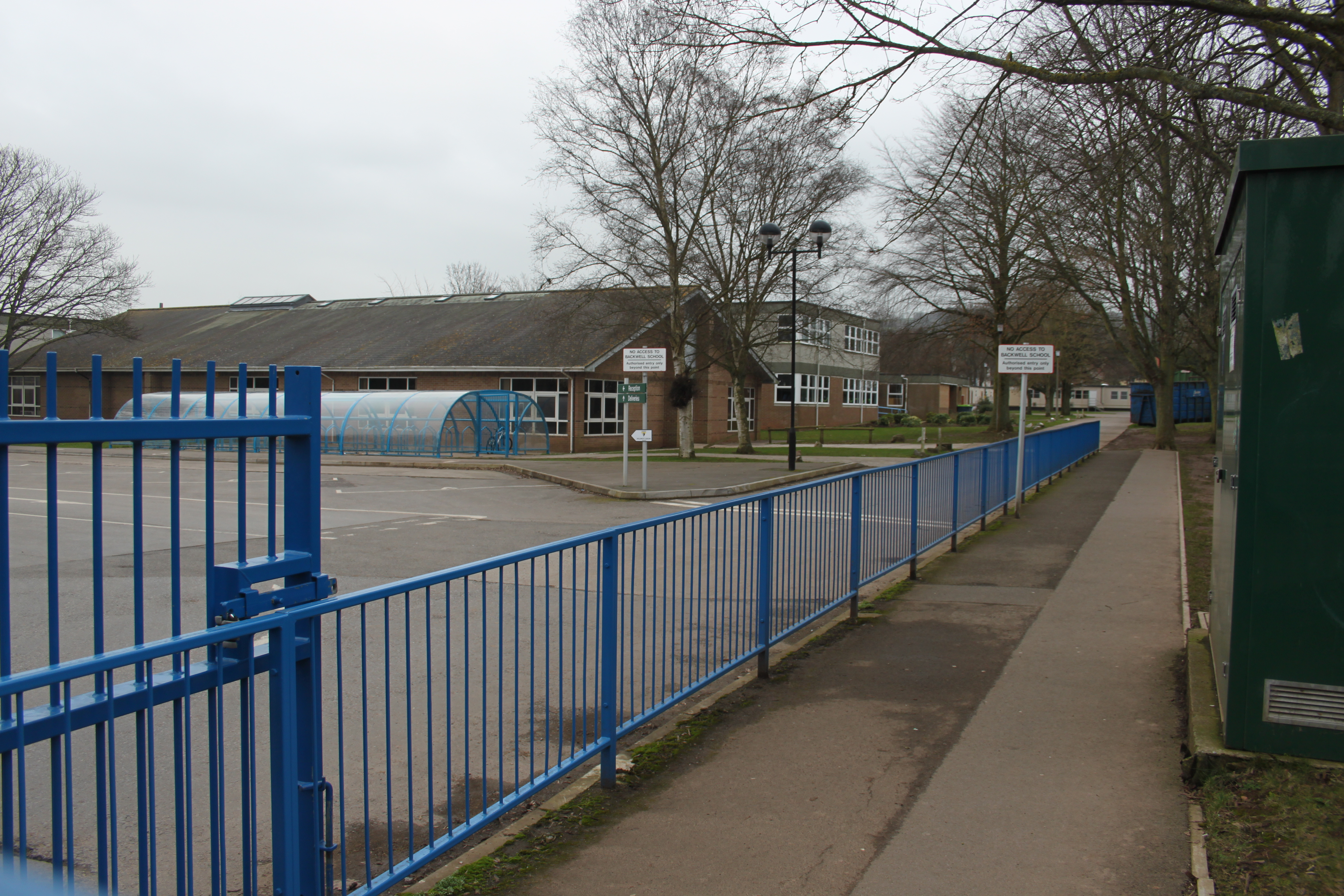
- The main gates

Location
- Station Road, Backwell; Somerset, BS48 3BX; England; 51.4161°N 2.7392°W

Information
- Type: Academy
- Established: 1954; 72 years ago
- Founder: Somerset County Council
- Local authority: North Somerset Council
- Trust: Backwell School Academy Trust
- Specialist: Performing and visual arts college
- Department for Education URN: 136722 Tables
- Ofsted: Reports
- Chair of Governors: Maurice Moloney
- Head teacher: Will Penny
- Gender: Mixed
- Age: 11 to 18
- Enrollment: 1,750 (Data from May 2019)
- Capacity: 1,728
- Houses: Cotswold; Mendip; Quantock; Sedgemoor
- Colours: Navy blue and gold
- Publication: Backchat, Backwell School Radio and The Toad
- Teaching school: Yes, since 2012
- Website: www.backwellschool.net

Backwell School is a secondary academy school in Backwell, Somerset, England. It was considered to be one of the best-performing state schools in England, leading results at both GCSE and A level in the area and consistently being rated "Outstanding" by Ofsted. It has now been rated "Good" by Ofsted.

The school is a National Teaching School, through which it leads the North Somerset Teaching Alliance, with Healthy School Plus and International School status. Since March 2011 the school has been a self-governing academy convert. It holds the Artsmark Gold award and includes a sixth form.

It has 1,738 pupils, of which 387 were in the school's sixth form in 2016, from the age of 11 (year 7) to the age of 18 (year 13). Backwell has previously been a Beacon School, specialist performing and visual arts college and National Training School.

== History ==
The original secondary modern school at Backwell was founded by Somerset County Council in 1954 and later became a comprehensive school in 1976 when the tripartite education system was abolished in the area. The school's original building dates from 1954, when Britain was in the midst of a post-war school-building boom.

The first Headmaster of The School, Mr W. C. M. Cox was in the 1946 New Year Honours (Mentioned in Dispatches) he was Flight Lieutenant W. C. M. Cox (133777), RAFVR.

In 2009, 71% of GCSE pupils achieved at least five GCSE passes above grade C including English and Maths. This is 21% above the national average that year. It is the highest performing state secondary school in North Somerset.

In November 2008, Backwell School was rated as outstanding by Ofsted. It was inspected again in May 2013 (no. 413323) due to the school having converted to an academy two years previous. It was judged to be outstanding in all categories.

On 11 September 2015 a small fire broke out in the Cotswold house building, causing minor damage to the block. All staff and pupils were safely evacuated.

== Catchment area ==
The school's catchment area includes the villages of Backwell, Yatton, Claverham, Cleeve and Kingston Seymour, although several hundred of the school's pupils come from locations outside of its official catchment area from locations such as Nailsea and Bristol. Admissions are managed by the local education authority – North Somerset Council.

== School site ==
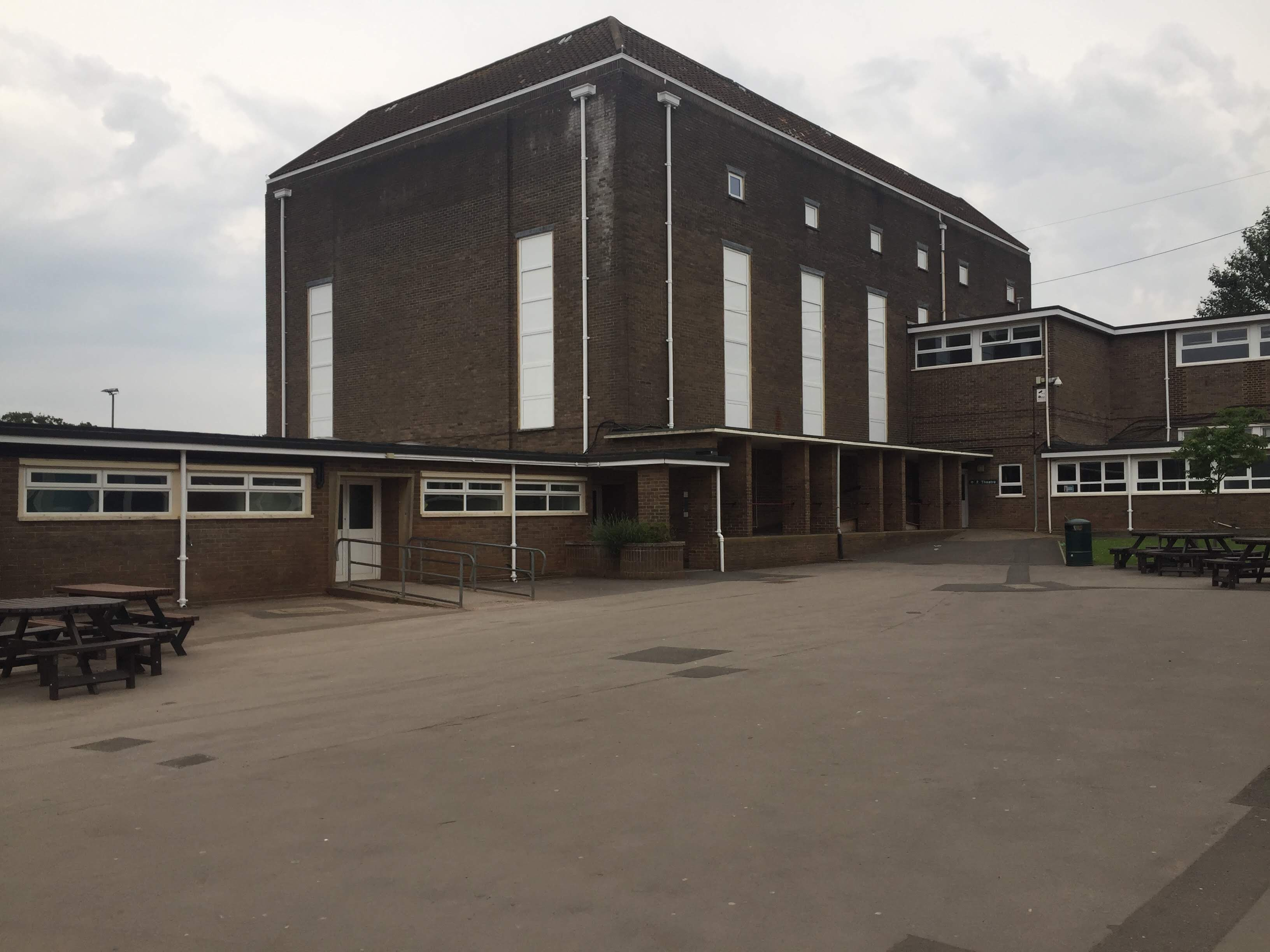
The original Lower School buildings. The building in the centre of this image is the main theatre.

The site at Backwell is relatively large, featuring multiple large sports grounds to the North. Buildings vary extremely in design and age with the oldest part of the original school, known as 'Lower School' and the 'Science Corridor', which includes the main theatre, dating back to 1954 – being the same design as at Kingsmead School while the Sixth Form Centre was completed in just 2011.

Backwell Leisure Centre is no longer part of the school grounds, but is situated directly next to the rear entrance of the school, and is used for swimming in PE lessons.

== Extracurricular activities ==
In 2015 a student radio station was launched. Run by a team of students, the station broadcasts live at lunchtimes with an automated system taking over at other times.

== Notable alumni ==
- Kirk Jones, film director
- Joel McIver, author

== Headteachers ==
- William Cox (1954–1970)
- Barbara Sellars (1970–1988)
- Richard Nosowski (1988–2002)
- Roger Mason (2002–2006)
- Julian Baldwin (2006–2016)
- Jon Nunes (2016–2025)
- Will Penny (2025-present)
