= Stancombe Quarry =

Limestone quarry in Somerset, England

Coordinates: 51.4107°N 2.7145°W

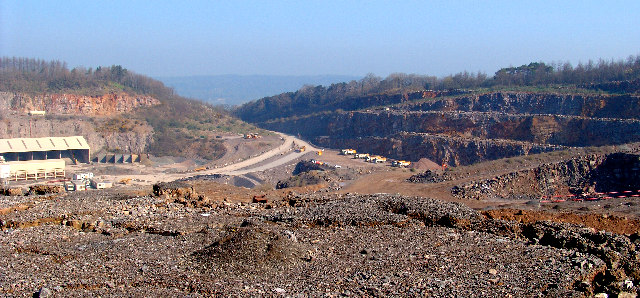
Stancombe Quarry

Stancombe Quarry shown within Somerset
(grid reference ST5040468208)

Stancombe Quarry is a quarry at Flax Bourton near Backwell in the North Somerset district of Somerset, England.

The quarry which is operated by Tarmac produces Carboniferous Limestone, which is mainly for use on the roads, after crushing on site. The site has an expected output of 28 million tonnes over a 25-year period.

In 1999 the car park at the quarry was used as a test site for a porous asphalt pavement.

In June 2010, an explosion involving a lorry injured two people in Stancombe Quarry. The A370 road was closed but opened the following day.
