= Elisha Smith Robinson =

English businessman & politician (1817-1885)

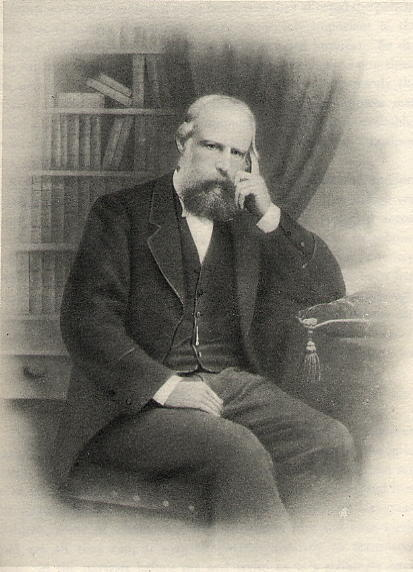
Elisha Smith Robinson

Elisha Smith Robinson (1817–1885) was an English businessman and politician.

== Early life and business career ==
Robinson was born in 1817 in Overbury, on the Worcestershire-Gloucestershire borders where his father Edward Robinson, a paper maker, lived in Silver Rill House. He was apprenticed to his maternal grandfather, Rev. Elisha Smith, a grocer and Baptist Minister in Blockley and Chipping Camden.

In 1840, his father was threatening to replace him within the family business with a Londoner, so he moved to Bristol with the help of a small loan. He founded his own printing and packaging business, E. S. & A. Robinson, in 1844. Within 20 years, his firm was the largest buyer of paper in the British Empire.

== Family ==
In 1845 he married Elizabeth Ring, with whom he had eight children; she died in 1871. Soon afterwards, he married Louisa Thomas, who died in 1875.

== Political career ==
Robinson became mayor of Bristol in 1866. He was elected as a Liberal Member of Parliament for Bristol in March 1870, but was unseated on a technicality. He stood again as an independent in 1880. He had a belligerent attitude to politics; he published his pledges in his own broadsheet, The Redcliffe Review, and was satirized in local cartoons.

He served as a Justice of the Peace, as well as chairman of the Bristol Port Railway and Pier (now Severn Beach Line), and president of the Grateful Society in 1880.

He was also the president of the Anchor Society in Bristol in 1859.

== Death and memorials ==
He died in 1885 at Ivy Towers, Sneyd Park, a house he designed. A memorial sermon preached by Reverend Richard Glover at Tyndale Baptist Church was published. He was memorialized in several locations. The foundation stone on the front of Chipping Campden Baptist Church reads "This stone was laid by Elisha Smith Robinson Esq - of Bristol on the 19th June 1872" There is relief at Bristol Beacon, of which he was a founder and benefactor. There is also a monument at Arnos Vale Cemetery.

== His family and cricket ==
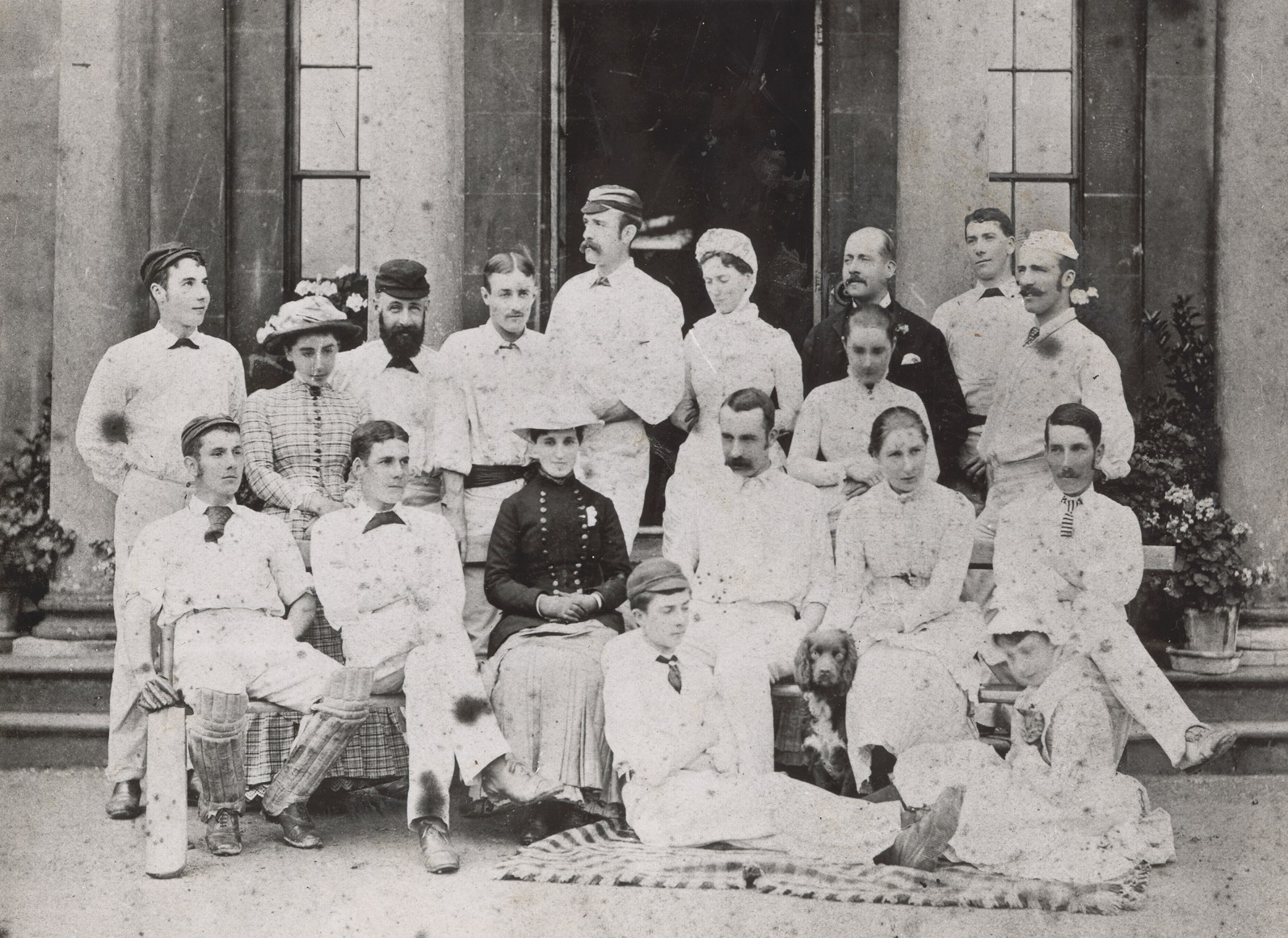
A cricket XI of Robinsons all directly related to Elisha Smith Robinson who lost by 37 runs to an XI of Graces all directly related to W.G.Grace.

Robinson's interest in cricket was inspired by two of his brothers:-

- Philip Robinson 1830-1886 founder of Robinson & Co in Singapore and
- John Robinson 1820-1886 founder of John Robinsons of Gloucester.

In 1878 Charles Parnell of West Town Cricket Club near Bristol proposed to Alfred Robinson, John's son, that he assemble a team to play on the August Bank Holiday. Alfred responded with a team made up entirely of Robinsons. From that day until 1964 Robinsons fielded a cricket XI on that bank holiday against various teams including one made up entirely of Graces in 1891.

Robinson first class cricketers descended from Elisha include:-

- Arthur Robinson, son of Elisha, 1855-1913 played for Gloucestershire.
- Percy Gotch Robinson, grandson, 1881–1951, played for Gloucestershire.
- Douglas C Robinson, grandson, 1884–1963, captained Gloucestershire, played for Essex, Marylebone Cricket Club, Gentlemen of England and England in 1924
- Vivian Robinson, grandson, 1897–1979, played for Gloucestershire, High Sheriff of Bristol 1936
- Foster Robinson, Grandson, 1880–1957, played for London County and Gloucestershire, Chairman of *E. S. & A. Robinson
- Crescens Robinson (1864-1941) an English first class cricketer, great nephew.
- Theodore Robinson (1866-1959) an English first class cricketer, great nephew.

Other notable descendants include:-

Edward Robinson 1853-1935 was the third son of Elisha Smith Robinson; Lord Mayor of Bristol in 1908. Chairman & managing director E. S. & A. Robinson, Vice chairman of the Bristol Chamber of Commerce, President of the Anchor Society in 1887, appointed a magistrate in 1889, Vice chairman of the Bristol South Liberal Association.

Arnold Wathen Robinson (1888–1955) an English stained-glass artist, grandson.

Thomas Robinson (1827-1897) an English corn merchant and Liberal politician, cousin.
