= Harry Chidgey =

English cricketer and Test match umpire

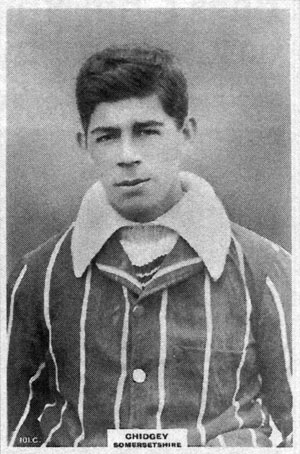

Personal information
- Full name: Harry Chidgey
- Born: 25 July 1879; Flax Bourton, Somerset, England
- Died: 16 November 1941 (aged 62); Flax Bourton, Somerset, England
- Batting: Right-handed
- Role: Wicketkeeper

Domestic team information
- Years: Team
- 1900–21: Somerset
- First-class debut: 2 August 1900 Somerset v Gloucestershire
- Last First-class: 15 August 1921 Somerset v Warwickshire

Umpiring information
- Tests umpired: 1 (1926)
- FC umpired: 43 (1925–1926)

Career statistics
Competition	First-class
Matches	99
Runs scored	717
Batting average	6.82
100s/50s	–/–
Top score	45
Catches/stumpings	135/56
- Source: CricketArchive, 15 November 2013

Harry Chidgey (25 July 1879 – 16 November 1941) was a first-class cricketer who played for Somerset as a wicketkeeper between 1900 and 1921, and a Test match umpire. He was born and died at Flax Bourton, Somerset.

Chidgey was the elder son of the innkeeper at the Angel Inn in Flax Bourton. He played as a professional cricketer for Somerset as a lower-order batsman and wicketkeeper and made his debut in the game against Gloucestershire in 1900. But with the amateurs Archie Wickham, Henry Martyn and Arthur Newton often available, Chidgey had just two further games in the 1902 season, and then did not reappear for six seasons. In the 1901 census, when he is living with his parents, he is listed as a "merchant's clerk".

After Somerset's disastrous 1907 season, Wickham retired and Newton scaled down his availability, so that from 1908 Chidgey became Somerset's regular wicketkeeper for the seasons up to, and just beyond, the First World War, though Newton made sporadic reappearances in several matches most seasons, nearly always home games for Somerset, and always displacing Chidgey: an indication of the pecking order between amateurs and professionals in Edwardian cricket is that of Chidgey's 99 first-class games, only 32 were home matches, and 18 of those were at Bath, the furthest outpost of Somerset cricket. In 1913, for example, he played 11 first-class games, one of them for Marylebone Cricket Club (MCC) and only one was in Somerset. But by the 1911 census, at which time he had been married and widowed, he was able to call himself a "professional cricketer" on the census form.

Chidgey batted normally at No 11 throughout his first-class career, but his highest score came in the 1909 season when he was sent in as nightwatchman at No 3 against Yorkshire at Bath and made 45, his partnership with the dour Len Braund enabling Somerset to draw the match. He returned to Somerset for the 1919 season after the First World War, but the county then cut the number of professionals in its team to two in the 1920 season, and he did not play at all that year; he returned, however, for some games in 1921 before leaving finally.

In 1925 and 1926, he was on the first-class umpires' list, and he was picked, alongside Sailor Young, for the fourth Test between England and Australia on the 1926 tour; the game, at Manchester, was ruined by rain with less than two full innings completed. He was picked as an umpire for first-class matches again in the 1927 season, but did not appear in any games.

In his obituary in the 1942 edition of Wisden Cricketers' Almanack, Chidgey was described as "rather small, quick and neat"; he had played for his local club at Flax Bourton from the age of 14 and was also involved in village affairs as a member of what Wisden terms "Long Ashton Urban District Council" (in fact, a rural district council).
