= Church of St Michael and All Angels, Flax Bourton =

Historic church in Flax Burton, Somerset, England, United Kingdom

Church of St. Michael and All Angels
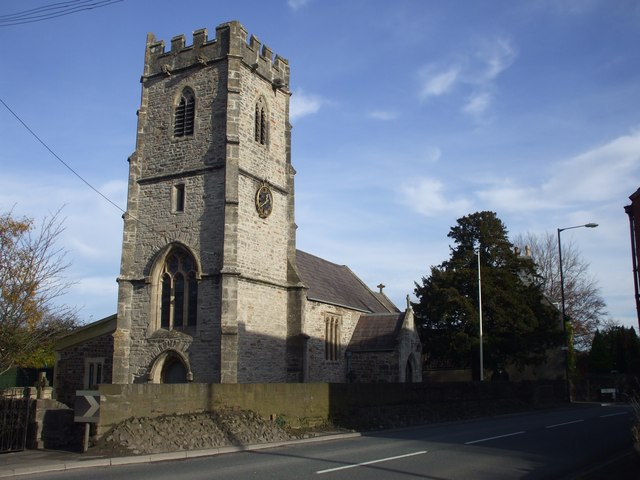

- Location within Somerset
- 51.4212°N 2.7110°W
- Location: Flax Bourton, Somerset, England

Listed Building – Grade II*
- Official name: Church of St. Michael and All Angels
- Designated: 11 October 1961
- Reference no.: 1129835

Listed Building – Grade II
- Official name: Remains of Churchyard Cross, in the Churchyard and to the south of St. Michael's Church
- Designated: 16 March 1984
- Reference no.: 1137771

The Anglican Church of St. Michael and All Angels in Flax Bourton in the English county of Somerset was built in the 12th century. It has been designated as a Grade II* listed building.

== History ==
The original construction of the church was in the 12th century however it was altered several times between the late 13th and 15th centuries. Victorian restoration in the mid 19th century was carried out by John Norton.

The parish is part of the benefice of Long Ashton with Barrow Gurney and Flax Bourton within the Diocese of Bath and Wells.

== Architecture ==
The church consists of a three-bay nave and chancel with a north aisle and south porch. The three-stage west tower is supported by diagonal buttresses.

Inside the church is a 12th-century font.

The remains of a late medieval churchyard cross on a square base can be seen in the churchyard.

== See also ==
- List of ecclesiastical parishes in the Diocese of Bath and Wells
