= Douglas Robinson (English cricketer) =

English cricketer and British army officer

Personal information
- Full name: Douglas Charles Robinson
- Born: 20 April 1884; Lawrence Weston, Bristol, England
- Died: 29 July 1963 (aged 79); Ham Court Farm, Gloucestershire, England
- Height: 6 ft 5 in (1.96 m)
- Batting: Right-handed
- Role: Batsman, wicket-keeper

Domestic team information
- Years: Team
- 1905–1926: Gloucestershire
- 1908: Essex

Career statistics
Competition	First-class
Matches	155
Runs scored	4,376
Batting average	17.29
100s/50s	1/16
Top score	150*
Catches/stumpings	123/39
- Source: CricketArchive, 4 December 2023

Lieutenant-Colonel Douglas Charles Robinson (20 April 1884 – 29 July 1963) was a British army officer and a first-class cricketer who captained Gloucestershire. He also played for Essex, Marylebone Cricket Club and for the amateur Gentlemen and England XI teams.

== Family and cricket ==
Robinson was born in 1883 at Lawrence Weston House near Bristol, and educated at Marlborough College. His father was Gloucestershire player Arthur Robinson and his grandfather was Elisha Smith Robinson. Many of his relations were prominent cricketers.

A wicket-keeper, Robinson played six times for Gentlemen v Players. He was captain of Gloucestershire from 1924 to 1926.

== Military career ==
Robinson attended the Royal Military Academy Sandhurst and was commissioned as a Second lieutenant in the 3rd (militia) Battalion, the Gloucestershire Regiment on 19 March 1902. He fought in World War I with the King's Own Royal Regiment (Lancaster), and became a lieutenant-colonel.

He later bred cows at Ham Court Farm near Cheltenham and died there in 1963.
