= Backwell Hillfort =

Iron Age hillfort in Somerset, England

- Location within Somerset
- 51°24′28″N 2°43′18″W
- Location: Backwell, Somerset, England

History
- Built: Iron Age

Scheduled monument
- Official name: Backwell Hillfort
- Reference no.: 194831

Backwell Hillfort is an Iron Age hill fort situated approximately 1.1 miles (1.8 km) from Backwell in the North Somerset district of Somerset, England. The hill fort was first discovered in 1933 with two of the three sides of the fort protected by a large ditch and a bank. In 1956, the site was nearly completely destroyed by quarrying at Coles Quarry, which ceased production in the 1970s.

== See also ==
- List of hill forts and ancient settlements in Somerset
