= Backwell =

Village in Somerset, England

Coordinates: 51.4131°N 2.7398°W

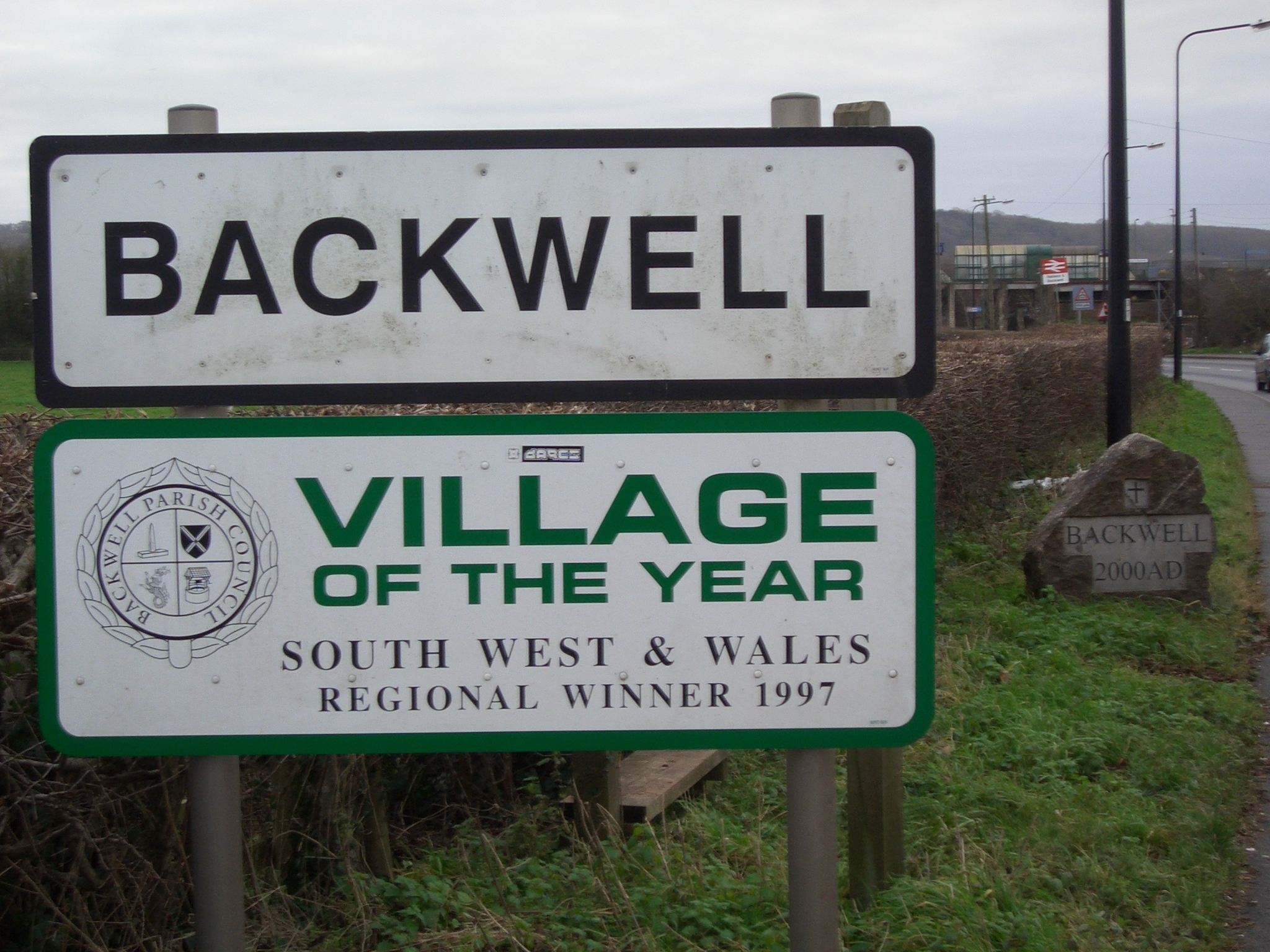
- Village of the Year signs marks the entrance to Backwell.

- Location within Somerset
- Population: 4,589 (2011)
- OS grid reference: ST485685
- Civil parish: Backwell
- Unitary authority: North Somerset
- Ceremonial county: Somerset
- Region: South West
- Country: England
- Sovereign state: United Kingdom
- Post town: BRISTOL
- Postcode district: BS48
- Dialling code: 01275
- Police: Avon and Somerset
- Fire: Avon
- Ambulance: South Western
- UK Parliament: North Somerset

Backwell is a village and civil parish in the unitary authority area of North Somerset, in the ceremonial county of Somerset, England. In 2011 it had a population of 4,589. The village lies about 7 miles (11 km) southwest of Bristol, south of the A370 to Weston-super-Mare. The parish includes the hamlets of Backwell Common, Backwell Green, and Backwell Farleigh, and the districts of Backwell West Town and Downside. (Note: Not to be confused with the Downside near Chilcompton.)

Nearby are Nailsea, Flax Bourton, Yatton, Brockley and Barrow Gurney.

== History ==
Backwell Hillfort between Flax Bourton and Backwell is an Iron Age hill fort.

The village has a long history, appearing in the Domesday Book in 1086 with the name 'Bacoile' meaning 'The well back on the hill'.

The parish was part of the hundred of Hartcliffe.

The lords of the manor from the 12th to 17th centuries were the Rodneys. Walter de Rodney was given the manor for his support of the Empress Matilda against King Stephen.

Backwell House is an historic house in the village which was operated as a boutique hotel between 2016 and 2022.

== Governance ==
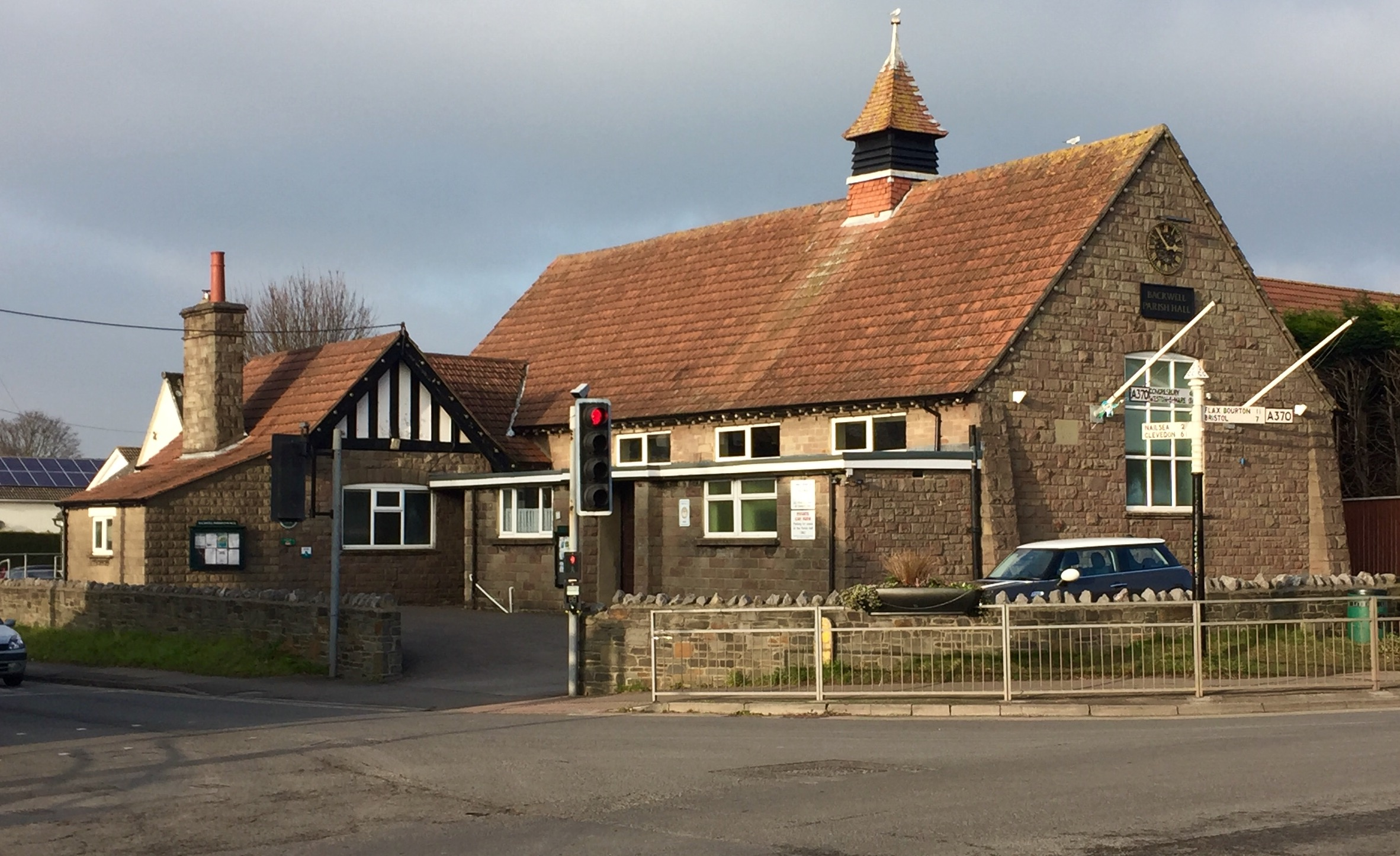
Backwell's Parish Hall, built in 1910

Backwell has its own parish council, made up of fifteen councillors which have responsibility for local issues, including setting an annual precept (local rate) to cover the council's operating costs and producing annual accounts for public scrutiny. The parish council evaluates local planning applications and works with the local police, district council officers, and neighbourhood watch groups on matters of crime, security, and traffic. The parish council's role also includes initiating projects for the maintenance and repair of parish facilities, such as the village hall or community centre, playing fields and playgrounds, as well as consulting with the district council on the maintenance, repair, and improvement of highways, drainage, footpaths, public transport, and street cleaning. Conservation matters (including trees and listed buildings) and environmental issues are also of interest to the council.

The parish falls within the unitary authority of North Somerset which was created in 1996, as established by the Local Government Act 1992. North Somerset Council provides a single tier of local government with responsibility for almost all local government functions within its area, including Backwell. Fire, police and ambulance services are provided jointly with other authorities through the Avon Fire and Rescue Service, Avon and Somerset Constabulary and the South Western Ambulance Service.

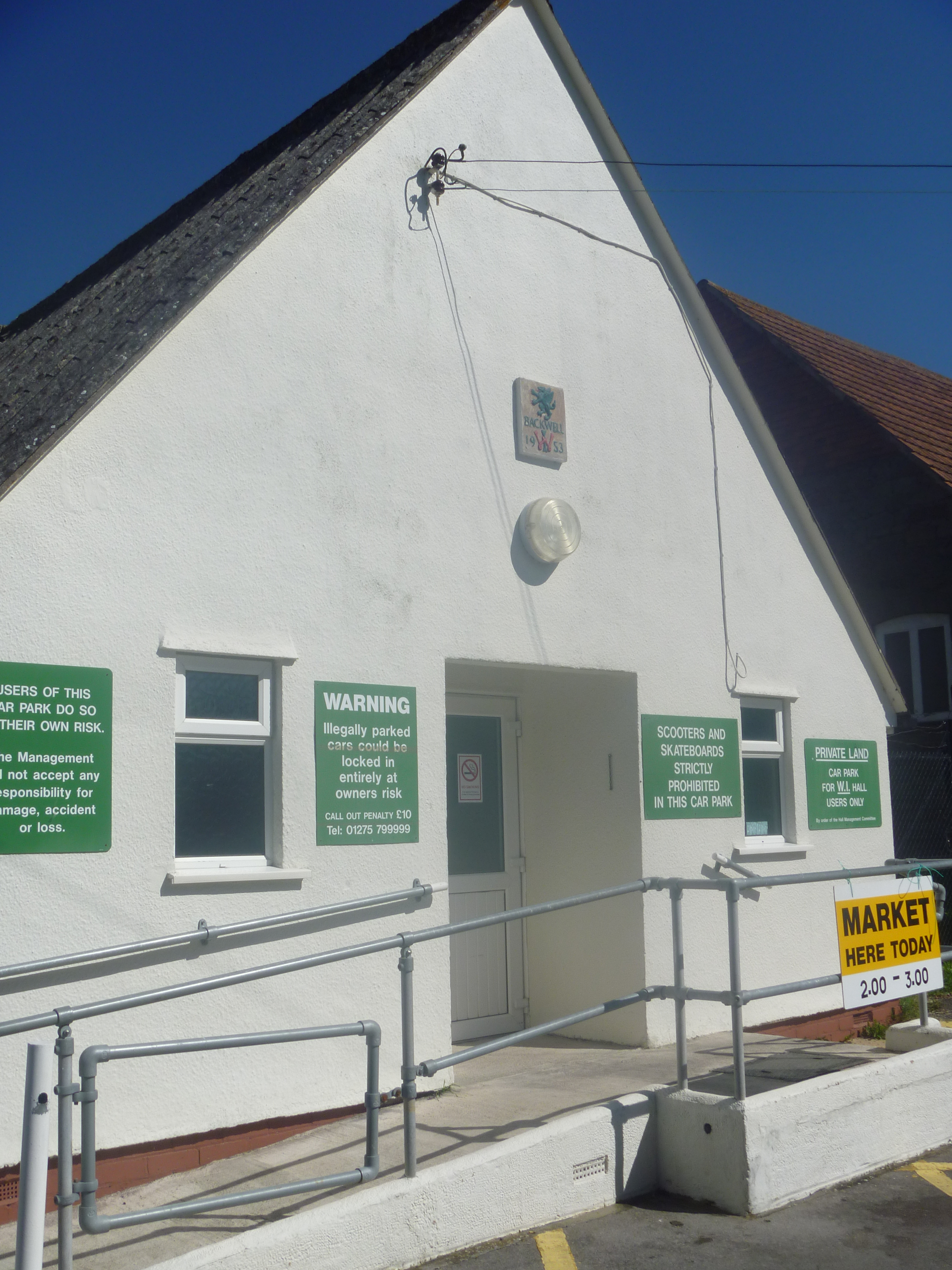
Women's Institutes hall

North Somerset's area covers the northernmost part of the ceremonial county of Somerset but it is administered independently of the non-metropolitan county. Its administrative headquarters is in the town hall in Weston-super-Mare. Between 1 April 1974 and 1 April 1996, it was in the Woodspring district of the county of Avon. Before 1974 that the parish was part of the Long Ashton Rural District.

An electoral ward in the same name exists. The ward stretches from Brockley, through Backwell to Barrow Gurney in the east and is represented by Bridget Petty of the Green Party of England and Wales since the 2019 council elections. The total population of this ward taken from the 2011 census was 5,930.

Backwell is represented in the House of Commons of the Parliament of the United Kingdom as part of the North Somerset constituency, which was created in 2010 and first used in the 2010 general election. It elects one Member of Parliament (MP) by the first past the post system of election, currently Sadik Al-Hassan, a member of the Labour Party.

== Geography ==
=== Backwell Lake ===
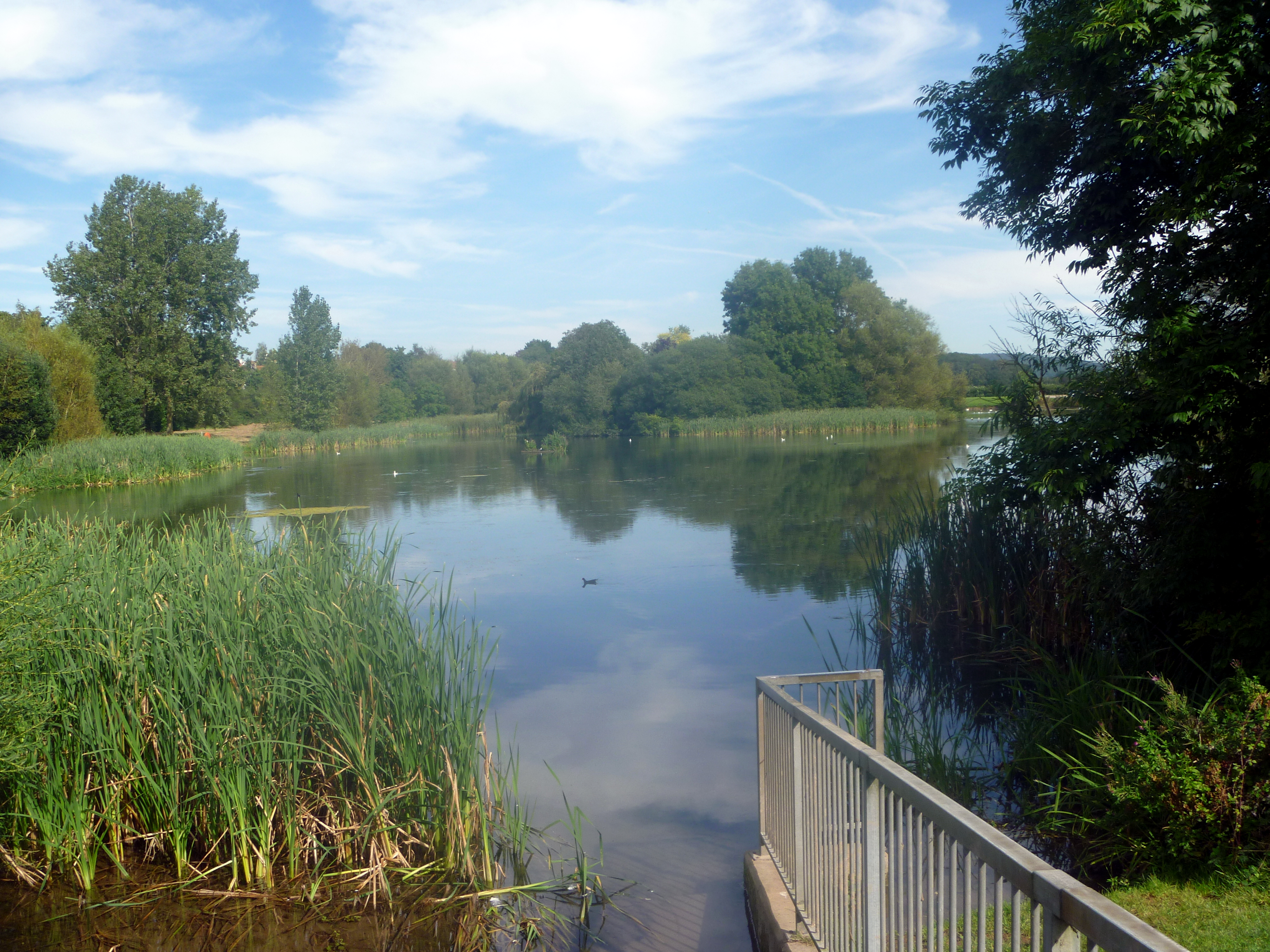
Backwell Lake

Backwell Lake, also known as Buckland's Pool, is on the edge of the village, adjacent to Nailsea. The site is owned by Wessex Water. Originally built as a balancing pond in the mid-1970s, it has become a wildlife haven for birds, bats and dragonflies, which are attracted by the open water and surrounding vegetation. Bird species include gadwall, shoveler, pochard, tufted duck, grey heron and mute swans. Over 19 different dragonfly species can also be found.

On 7 January 2018, local people circled the lake, linking hands, to protest against the proposed building of 700 homes and a four-lane link road in the village by Taylor Wimpey, which they believed would affect the lake and its wildlife.

=== Quarries ===
Stancombe Quarry opened in 1952. Today, the quarry which is operated by Tarmac, produces Carboniferous Limestone, which is mainly for use on the roads, after crushing on site. The site has an expected output of 28 million tonnes over a 25-year period. The now defunct Coles Quarry, in the south of the village, also produced limestone until it was closed by North Somerset Council.

=== Climate ===
The annual mean temperature is approximately 10 °C (50.0 °F). Seasonal temperature variation is less extreme than most of the United Kingdom because of the adjacent sea temperatures. The summer months of July and August are the warmest with mean daily maxima of approximately 21 °C (69.8 °F). In winter mean minimum temperatures of 1 or 2 °C (33.8 or 35.6 °F) are common. In the summer the Azores high pressure affects the south-west of England, however convective cloud sometimes forms inland, reducing the number of hours of sunshine. Annual sunshine rates are slightly less than the regional average of 1,600 hours. In December 1998 there were 20 days without sun recorded at Yeovilton. Most of the rainfall in the south-west is caused by Atlantic depressions or by convection. Most of the rainfall in autumn and winter is caused by the Atlantic depressions, which is when they are most active. In summer, a large proportion of the rainfall is caused by sun heating the ground leading to convection and to showers and thunderstorms. Average rainfall is around 700 mm (28 in). About 8–15 days of snowfall is typical. November to March have the highest mean wind speeds, and June to August have the lightest winds. The predominant wind direction is from the south-west.

== Recreation ==
=== Playing Fields ===
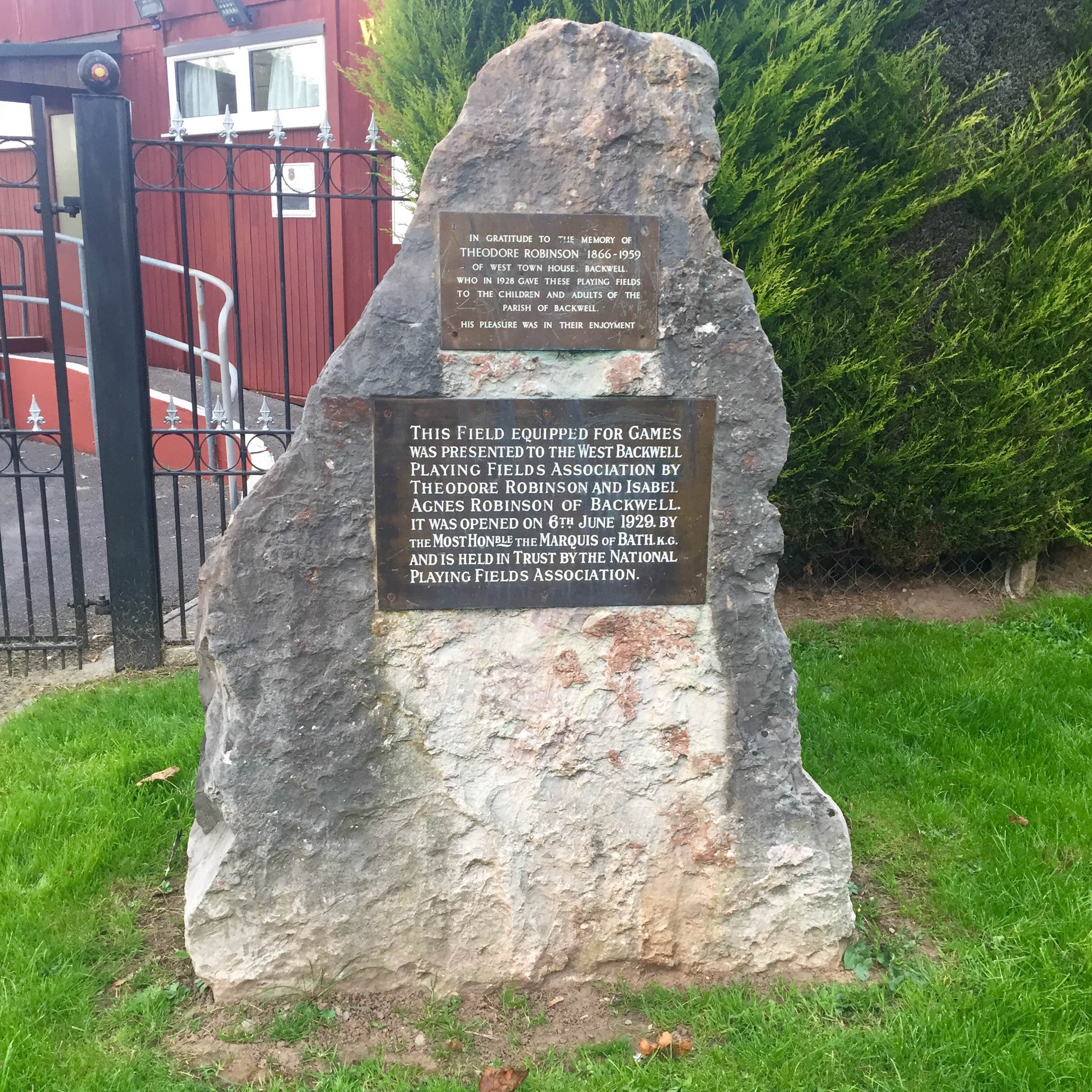
This stone, on the West Town Road side of the playing fields, is dedicated to benefactor and original landowner Theodore Robinson

Backwell Playing Fields is a 17-acre (6.9-hectare) public park and a collection of sports fields in the western side of Backwell.

On 6 June 1929 Theodore Robinson opened the park to the public and gave it to the "Children and adults of the parish of Backwell". The fields were opened on 6 June 1929 by the then Marquis of Bath, Thomas Thynne.

The fields are often used for playing football, mainly for Ashton and Backwell United FC's home games, as the club's home and stadium is at the Playing Fields. Other sports grounds at the Fields are Backwell Tennis Club, West Backwell Bowling Club, and Backwell Judo Club. The fields are also home to a youth club. 1st Backwell Scouts hut is just outside the park boundaries, but the fields are used a lot by them for their outdoor activities.

=== Sports ===
Ashton & Backwell United F.C. was originally called Backwell United but then merged with one of Bristol's largest youth club's Ashton Boys FC. They are currently members of the Western League First Division. They moved to their current home in 1947, the Backwell Recreation Ground.

Backwell Karate, also known as Backwell Shotokan Karate Club, was established in the village in 1978 and is a member club of Bristol Karate Academy and the Japan Karate Shoto Federation governing body.

Backwell Golf Club (now defunct) first appeared during the 1890s, and closed prior to World War 1. Tall Pines Golf Club was founded in 1989, and is located in Downside, adjacent to Bristol Airport.

== Facilities ==
As well as the facilities in the Playing Fields, Backwell also has:

- Post office
- Doctor's surgery
- Dentist
- Pharmacy
- Corner Shop
- Newsagent's shop
- 2 pubs
- A theatre
- 4 Barbershops/Hair Salons
- Swimming pool
- Estate agent
- Funeral Directors
- Bakery
- Railway Station
- Fish-and-chip shops
- Grill House Cafe
- Indian takeaway
- Many red telephone boxes
- Petrol Station
- Mobile phone shop

In the past there had been a bank, a library and other pubs in the village, which are now closed.

== Education ==
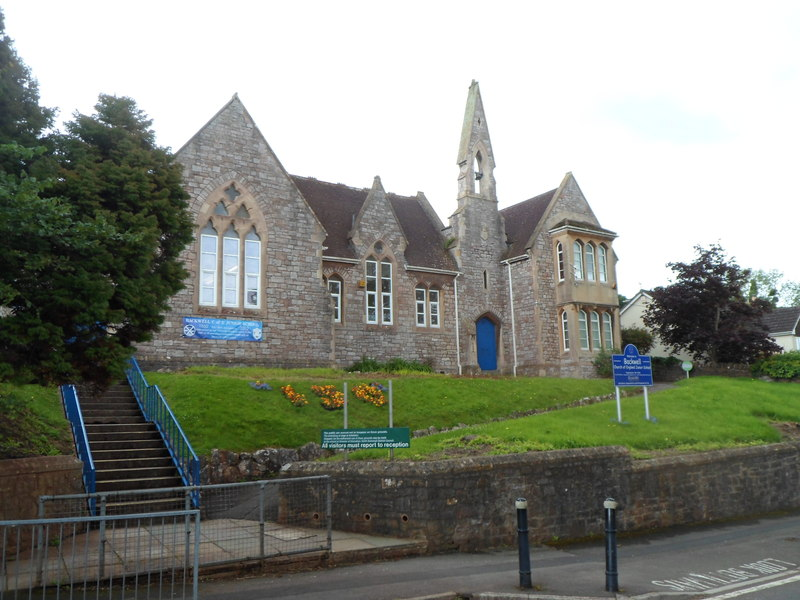
Backwell Church of England Junior school educates local children between the ages of 7 and 11.

The largest junior school in Backwell is Backwell Church of England Junior School, which provides education to 240 children aged between 7 and 11. The school is highly praised by Ofsted and performs consistently well in the league tables. In addition there is West Leigh Infant School which covers reception and Key Stage 1 and which has received an outstanding Ofsted report. In 2013, West Leigh and Backwell Junior schools became a federation.

A private primary school, Fairfield PNEU, is located in the village, having been founded in 1935 and moved to its current site in 1947. In 2025 it was announced that Fairfield School was to close.

The secondary school, Backwell School, consistently features high in the league tables for GCSE results, and is recognised as one of the best state schools in North Somerset. Pupils travel to the school from surrounding areas, such as Bristol and Yatton, by public transport or school coach. The school has about 1,700 pupils and used to be a Secondary Modern until the abolition of the Tripartite System. Alumni include Richard Ottaway, politician and the author Joel McIver. The Liberal Democrat MP Richard Foord was also educated in Backwell.

== Transport ==
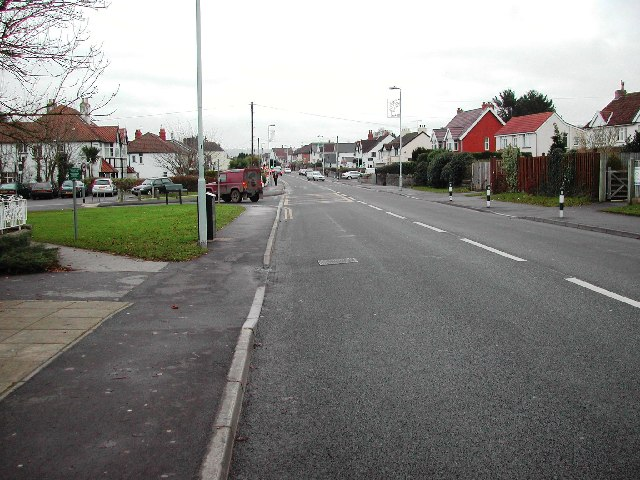
The A370 road running through Backwell

Many residents of Backwell commute daily to Bristol by car via the A370, and public transport — First West of England operates the local buses; service X1 (Bristol bus station - Weston-super-Mare) stop at Backwell in both directions. Service X7 (Bristol Bus station - Nailsea) also serves the village; between the bus station and Nailsea. The closest motorway is the M5, accessible from junctions 21 and 18.

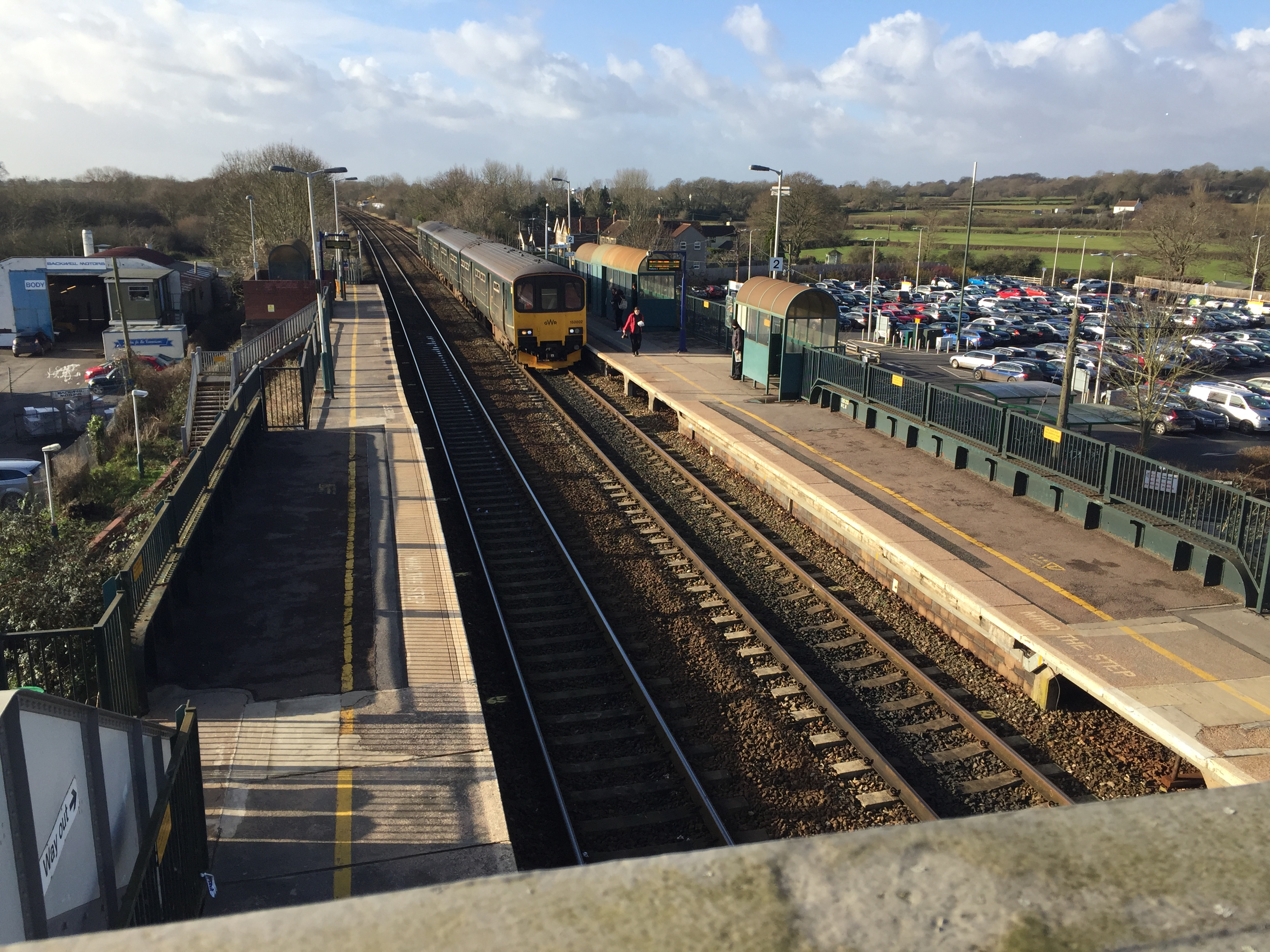
The station in 2018

Nailsea and Backwell railway station is at the north end of the village. It was opened in 1841 by the Bristol and Exeter Railway and subsequently run by the Great Western Railway. It is nowadays managed by Great Western Railway. The station has regular services between Taunton, Weston-super-Mare and Cardiff, as well as some peak services directly to and from London Paddington. The station is mostly unstaffed, except during the morning peak. The direct service to London makes the village popular with commuters willing to spend four hours a day travelling by train.

Bristol Airport is at Lulsgate Bottom, which borders the district of Downside, 3 miles (4.8 km) from the centre of Backwell. The airport serves both domestic and international routes.

== Religious sites ==
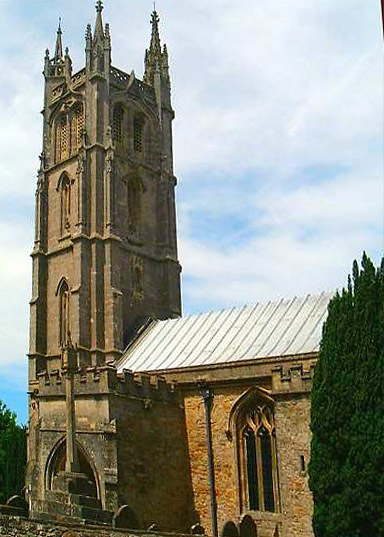
St Andrew's Church, Backwell

The Anglican parish church of St. Andrew dates from the 12th century. It was altered and enlarged in the 13th, 15th, 16th and 17th centuries. It has been designated as a Grade I listed building.

The tower at the west end of the church is over 100 feet (30 m) tall and dates from the 15th century. It contains a ring of eight bells, two of which are medieval.

The font dates from the 12th century. It consists of a circular bowl with cable moulding, and a circular stem with foliate moulding on the base. It was restored in 1907.

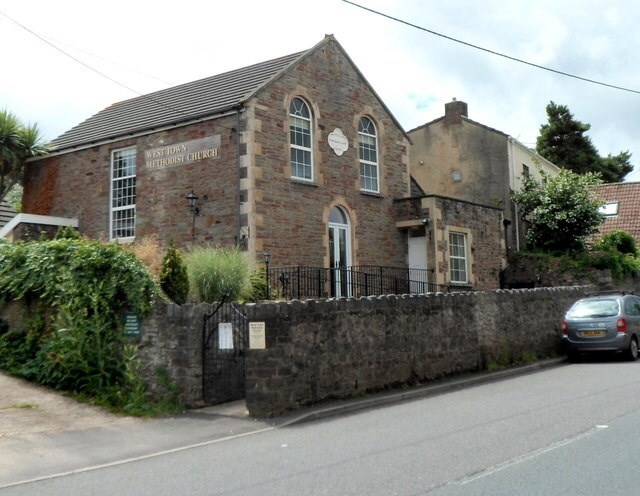
West Town Methodist Church

West Town Methodist is a Wesleyan Zion chapel on the A370 road in Backwell West Town. It was renovated from a house in 1853 when ten Methodist Backwell residents clubbed together to purchase it and renovate it into the chapel. The church underwent an interior renovation in 1992 which saw a doubling in membership.

There is also a modern Baptist church on Chapel Hill.

== See also ==
- Strawberries and Cream Tree

== Notable people ==
- R. M. Hare (1919–2002), a British moral philosopher at the University of Oxford from 1966 until 1983.
- Sir Richard Ottaway (born 1945), consultant, politician and MP from 1983 to 1987 & 1992 to 2015, went to Backwell School.
- Amy Wadge (born 1975), an English singer and songwriter.
- Oli Beckingsale (born 1976), an ex-professional mountain biker, he represented Britain at the Olympic Games
