= Strawberries and Cream Tree =

Famous tree in Backwell, England

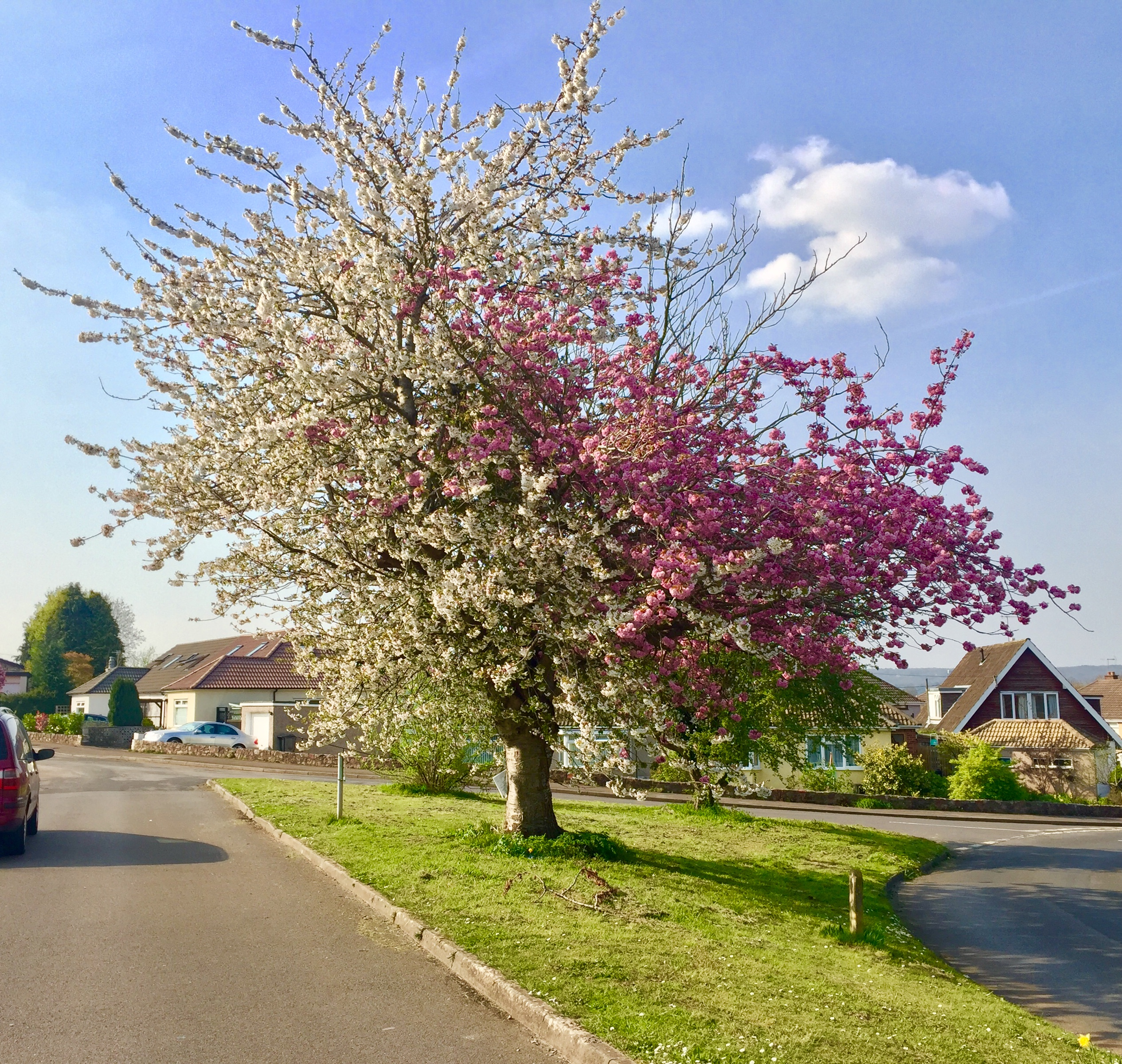
- The Strawberries and Cream Tree in full bloom in April 2020, showing its distinctive pink and white blossoms.
- Interactive map of Strawberries and Cream Tree
- Species: Wild cherry (Prunus avium) + Kanzan (P. serrulata 'Kanzan') graft hybrid
- Location: Rodney Road, Backwell, North Somerset, England
- Coordinates: 51°24′52.3″N 02°44′42.2″W
- Date seeded: c. 1950s
- Custodian: North Somerset Council

The Strawberries and Cream Tree is a graft hybrid cherry tree (of Prunus avium and P. serrulata 'Kanzan') in Backwell, North Somerset, England. Planted on council land in the 1950s, it is noted for producing two distinct colours of blossom: pink blossom on one side of the tree and white on the other, when it blooms every spring. This gave rise to the name 'Strawberries and Cream Tree', which was coined by children of Backwell.

It is one of only two reported examples of cherry-Kanzan graft hybrid trees in England; the other being in Portchester, Hampshire.

== Botany ==
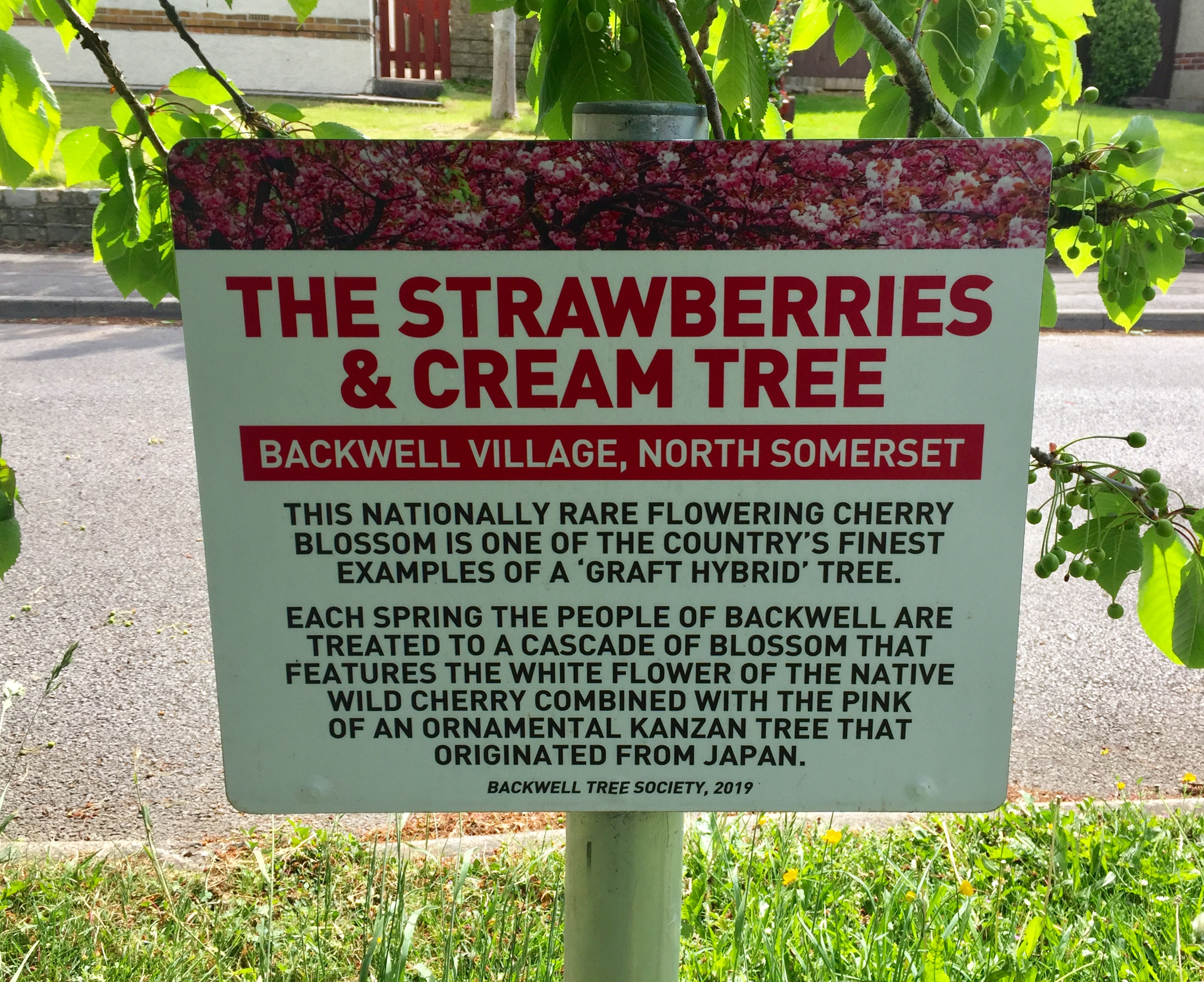
A sign adjacent to the tree outlines its botanical information.

The Strawberries and Cream Tree is a native wild cherry tree (Prunus avium) grafted with Prunus 'Kanzan', an ornamental cherry variety from Japan. The wild cherry produces the white blossom, while the 'Kanzan' produces the pink blossom. The dual blossom gave rise to the name 'Strawberries and Cream Tree', coined by children of Backwell.

Fruit trees tend to be grafted onto the rootstock of a hardier tree variety, usually to provide them with additional water and nutrients. In the case of the Strawberries and Cream tree, the rootstock grew along with the tree, creating a graft hybrid.

== History ==
The Strawberries and Cream Tree was planted on public land which is now owned by North Somerset Council, on Rodney Road in the village of Backwell. It is not known who originally planted and grafted the tree, but it is believed to have been planted in the late 1950s. Following a visit from North Somerset Council's tree officer in August 2025, the tree was described as "struggling" due to the sustained dry weather of that summer, with pruning and laying of mulch planned to aid in recovery. Since the summer of 2025, the tree has been behind metal fencing to protect it from an increase of construction vehicles from a nearby housing development.

=== Tree preservation order ===
Due to its uniqueness, the Strawberries and Cream Tree was granted a six-month tree preservation order on 14 December 2019. The order prevents the cutting down, lopping or topping of the tree without prior permission from the council. The order became permanent in June 2020. A planning application was made in 2026 for remedial pruning to the tree and mulching, intended to mitigate the current decline in the tree's health.
