= Arthur Robinson (cricketer, born 1855) =

English cricketer

Personal information
- Born: 22 June 1855; Bristol
- Died: 24 February 1913 (aged 57); Lawrence Weston, Gloucestershire
- Batting: Right-handed

Domestic team information
- Years: Team
- 1878: Gloucestershire
- Source: Cricinfo, 4 April 2014

Arthur Robinson (22 June 1855 – 24 February 1913) was an English cricketer. He played three matches for Gloucestershire in 1878. He was the son of Elisha Smith Robinson and the father of Douglas Robinson. He joined E. S. & A. Robinson in 1874 and with his brother Edward steered it towards becoming a limited company. His priority was always the business over County Cricket. In 1874 he made a substantial donation to Marlborough College to enable the building of the cricket pavilion. He was the President of the Grateful Society in 1893.
