= Flax Bourton =

Coordinates: 51.4223°N 2.7112°W

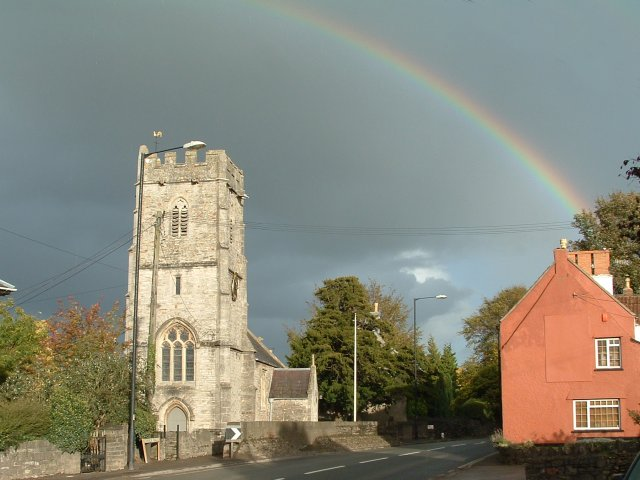
- Flax Bourton church in 2004

- Location within Somerset
- Population: 715 (2011)
- OS grid reference: ST505695
- Unitary authority: North Somerset
- Ceremonial county: Somerset
- Region: South West
- Country: England
- Sovereign state: United Kingdom
- Post town: BRISTOL
- Postcode district: BS48
- Dialling code: 01275
- Police: Avon and Somerset
- Fire: Avon
- Ambulance: South Western
- UK Parliament: North Somerset

Flax Bourton is a village and civil parish in Somerset, England. The parish, with a population of 715, is within the unitary authority of North Somerset, on the edge of Nailsea Moor on the A370 road 5 miles (8.0 km) south west of Bristol city centre.

The village has a primary school, one pub named The Jubilee Inn, a church dating back to Norman times and is the home of Backwell Flax Bourton Cricket Club.

== History ==
Backwell Hillfort between Flax Bourton and Backwell is an Iron Age hill fort.

To the north of the village and close to the Bristol to Exeter railway line a mill was built on the Land Yeo. It may have existed at the time of the Domesday Book and strong documentary evidence exists from 1769. Between 1839 and 1885 the river was diverted into the tailrace of the mill, eliminating a bend in the river. All that remains of the three-storey mill is a single-storey garage of a private house.

Farleigh Hospital and the Church of St. George was built in 1837 as a Workhouse for the Bedminster Union. Also on Old Weston Road is the former Long Ashton Magistrate's Court and Police Station, which was built in 1857–58 by John Norton and is now home to the Coroner's court for Bristol and North Somerset.

An MoD fuel depot, part of the Government Pipelines and Storage System with its own railway sidings, is just off the main line behind the former station. Its future is currently under review. It was constructed between 1954 and 1957 by Esso as part of the North Somerset Complex of sites and pipelines for the storage of white oil products. It was originally connected by five pipelines but only one was operational by 1990. It was originally designed for distribution by road and rail with two rail gantries and three road gantries. The site was emptied and closed in the early 1990s following the end of the Cold War.

== Governance ==
The parish council has responsibility for local issues, including setting an annual precept (local rate) to cover the council's operating costs and producing annual accounts for public scrutiny. The parish council evaluates local planning applications and works with the local police, district council officers, and neighbourhood watch groups on matters of crime, security, and traffic. The parish council's role also includes initiating projects for the maintenance and repair of parish facilities, such as the village hall or community centre, playing fields and playgrounds, as well as consulting with the district council on the maintenance, repair, and improvement of highways, drainage, footpaths, public transport, and street cleaning. Conservation matters (including trees and listed buildings) and environmental issues are also of interest to the council.

The parish falls within the unitary authority of North Somerset which was created in 1996, as established by the Local Government Act 1992. It provides a single tier of local government with responsibility for almost all local government functions within its area including local planning and building control, local roads, council housing, environmental health, markets and fairs, refuse collection, recycling, cemeteries, crematoria, leisure services, parks, and tourism. It is also responsible for education, social services, libraries, main roads, public transport, trading standards, waste disposal and strategic planning, although fire, police and ambulance services are provided jointly with other authorities through the Avon Fire and Rescue Service, Avon and Somerset Constabulary and the South Western Ambulance Service.

North Somerset's area covers part of the ceremonial county of Somerset but it is administered independently of the non-metropolitan county. Its administrative headquarters is in the town hall in Weston-super-Mare. Between 1 April 1974 and 1 April 1996, it was the Woodspring district of the county of Avon. Before 1974 that the parish was part of the Long Ashton Rural District.

The parish is represented in the House of Commons of the Parliament of the United Kingdom as part of the North Somerset constituency. It elects one member of parliament (MP) by the first past the post system of election, currently Liam Fox of the Conservative Party. It was also part of the South West England constituency of the European Parliament prior to Britain leaving the European Union in January 2020, which elected seven MEPs using the d'Hondt method of party-list proportional representation.

== Geography ==
Stancombe Quarry was first built in 1952. Today, the quarry which is operated by Tarmac, produces Carboniferous Limestone, which is mainly for use on the roads, after crushing on site. The site has an expected output of 28 million tonnes over a 25-year period.

Along with the rest of South West England, Flax Bourton has a temperate climate which is generally wetter and milder than the rest of the country.

== Transport ==
In 1860 Flax Bourton railway station was opened by the Bristol and Exeter Railway just west of the short tunnel at the summit of the climb from Bristol. It closed to passengers on 2 December 1963. Sustrans have recently built a cycle path leading to Backwell and Nailsea, adjacent to the railway line. Today the nearest station is Nailsea and Backwell. There are also regular bus links available from Farleigh Green (to Weston-super-Mare), and top of station road (to Bristol).

== Religious sites ==
The Anglican parish church of St. Michael and All Angels has 12th-century origins and has been designated as a Grade II* listed building.

== Notable residents ==
- Edward MacLysaght (1887–1986) genealogist of twentieth century Ireland
- Field Marshal Roland Christopher Gibbs GCB, CBE, DSO, MC, KStJ (1921–2004) was Chief of the General Staff, the professional head of the British Army
- Harry Chidgey, cricketer
- Noah Marullo, actor
- Leonard Curtis Luckwill, (1914-2005), pioneering cider apple scientist who lived at Mayscroft, Flax Bourton between 1945 and 1985
- Roger Gregory Luckwill, (1943-2022), zoologist and physiologist
- Anthony Peter Luckwill, (1973-2020), writer
