= E. S. & A. Robinson =

British paper, printing and packaging company

E. S. & A. Robinson was a British paper, printing and packaging company founded in Bristol in 1844. In 1966, it merged with John Dickinson Stationery to form the Dickinson Robinson Group (DRG) creating one of the world's largest stationery and packaging companies.

== History ==
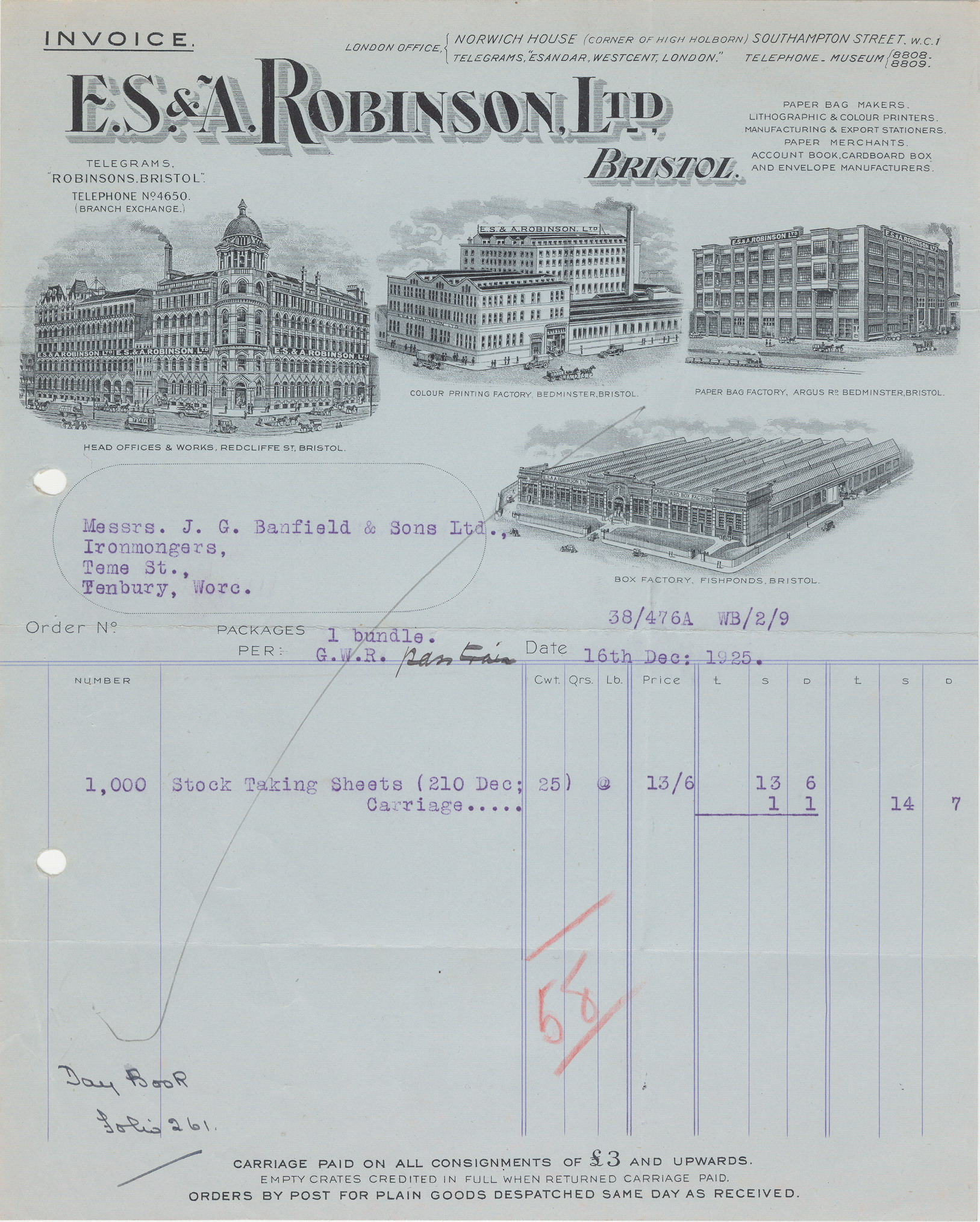
An invoice raised by ES&A Robinson in 1925 for general stationery and showing illustrations of all the ES&A buildings of the era in Bristol.

The company was founded in 1844 by Elisha Smith Robinson who was joined by his brother Alfred in 1848. The company prospered quickly by making paper bags for grocery stores and then branched out into printing items such as the tradesman's almanack, elaborate notepapers and bound ledgers.

By 1860, the company had eleven lithographic presses, two lithographic machines worked by steam power and a machine for making paper bags. As paper merchants it held the greatest supply of paper in any firm in the kingdom.

In 1870, after further enlargement of the premises in Redcliffe Street, Elisha declared to the architect, the builders and the clerk of works: "Gentlemen, I have the finest printing factory in the West of England, and neither I nor those who come after me will ever want to enlarge it." By 1887 the company had a new block of buildings at Bedminster, and this in its turn was only to suffice the company for five years.

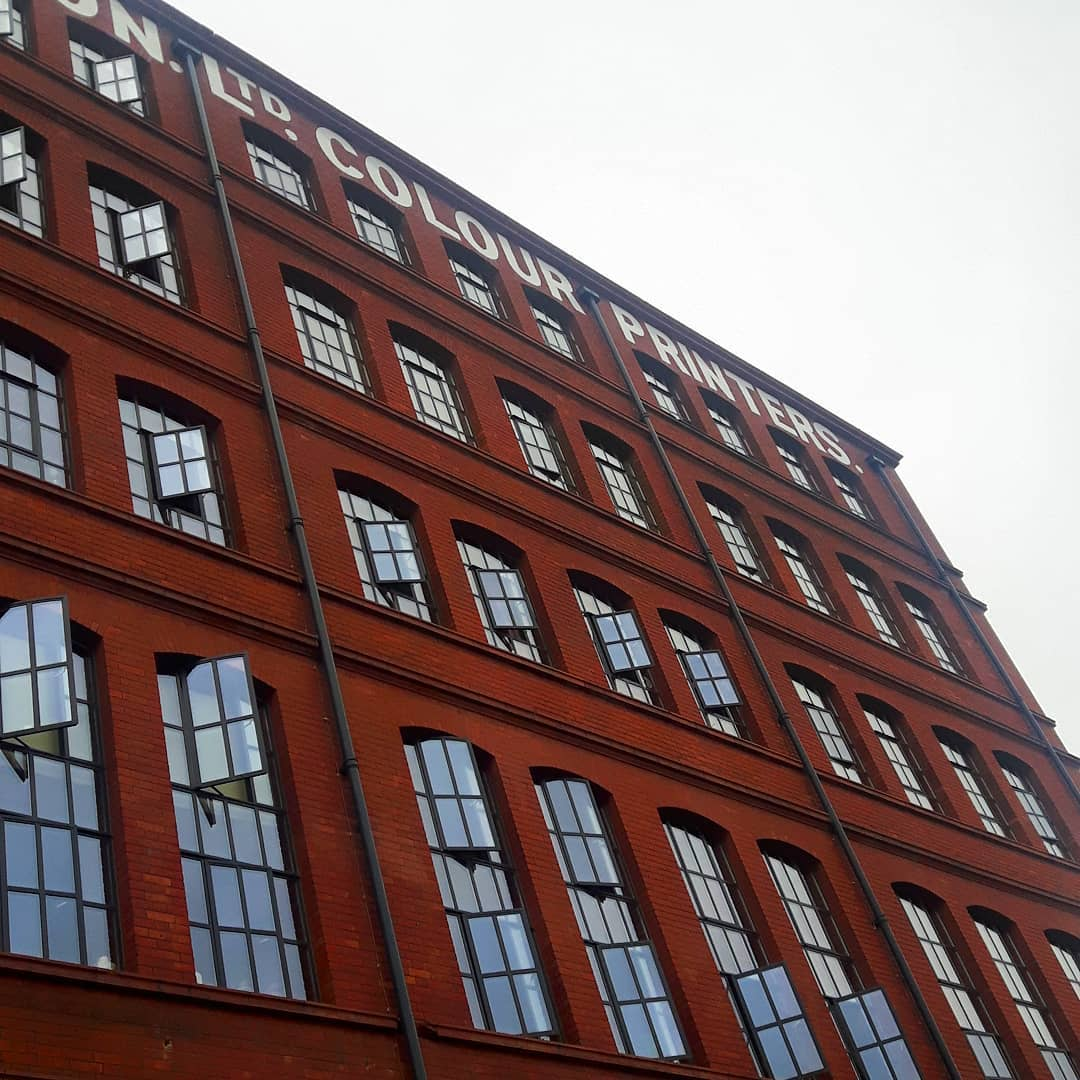
The Robinson Building in Bedminster

This block of buildings, formerly the colour printing factory located in Bedminster, is still standing and in use today. Part of the site is occupied by Cameron Balloons and the five-storey factory building has been developed into residential apartments. The converted Robinson Building and East Street Church today contains over 100 homes.

Robinsons acquired the printing works of Ensor & Co. in Marsh Street in 1872.

In 1873 Elisha Robinson bought the rights to an American patent for a paper satchel bag (inventor: Margaret E. Knight) which in addition to making everyday shopping easier, eventually revolutionized the trade in paper packaging of materials such as Portland Cement and flour.

Elisha's sons Edward and Arthur Robinson joined the company respectively in 1869 and 1874. Elisha Smith Robinson died in 1885.

A technique stumbled upon in 1887 by American paper dealer Robert Gair led to the mass production of cartons and folding boxes; this accelerated the growth of the Bedminster and later Fishponds operations.

In 1889 one week's paid holiday was granted to employees with service of a year or more. At the time the wider business community considered this was innovative and overly generous. The Robinsons however continued to demonstrate a balanced reaction to the emerging trade union influences, and later were industry leaders in the introduction of pensions and profit-sharing schemes.

Edward and Arthur Robinson turned the business into a limited company in 1893.

A Mr Benwell, manager of bag making, chanced in 1902 upon an idea for printing on bags. The demand for bags printed with logos and advertising proved to be enormous and a hundred million were ordered within a few weeks of the process being operational. A patent was later sold to the Union Bag Company (later the Union Camp Corporation).

The Malago Factory in Bedminster was completed in 1912 and by 1930 it was producing 25 million bags per week.

Robinsons acquired John Laird & Son Ltd, printers in Glasgow, in 1918 and the Strachan & Henshaw engineering company in 1920.

In 1920 E S & A Robinson (South Africa) Ltd was incorporated, and later Paper Sacks (South Africa) Ltd. In 1924 Robinson Waxed Paper Co. Ltd was incorporated; by 1929 it exported wax paper from its Fishponds factory to New Zealand, Malaya, China, India, Ceylon, the West Indies, Egypt, Palestine, Iceland, Denmark and Sweden. E S & A Robinson (Canada) Ltd was founded in Toronto in 1932.

Company engineers developed in 1940 an aircraft template reproduction process that was adopted by almost the whole of the British aircraft industry. The process received commendation from Sir Stafford Cripps for a significant contribution to the war effort.

Foster Robinson was appointed chairman in 1944. The company acquired a De Havilland Heron aircraft in 1955 to ferry company executives and technicians.

A new headquarters (and Bristol's first skyscraper) was designed by in-house architects between 1962 and 1964, and built at One Redcliffe Street, Bristol.

== The Final Years ==
Robinsons merged with John Dickinson Stationery in 1966 to form the Dickinson Robinson Group (DRG), creating one of the world's largest stationery and packaging companies. Products with a high public profile included Sellotape and Basildon Bond.

Between 1974 and 1979 DRG acquired Papeteries de La Couronne, J. Arthur Dixon, Royal Sovereign and John Heath.

Roland Franklin (Pembridge Investments) acquired DRG in 1989 with a leveraged buyout worth £900m, fuelling debate within the British electorate about the asset stripping of established British companies and causing discomfort amongst the many remaining Robinson shareholders. It also drew criticism from London's Financial Times for short-termism.

Bowater (now Rexam) acquired DRG Packaging in 1992.

In 1990 DRG Stationery was sold to ″Biber Holding AG″ of Switzerland. Its name was changed back to John Dickinson Stationery Limited. In 2008 it was bought and rebranded by Hamelin.
