= Filton Bank =

Railway line section in Bristol, England

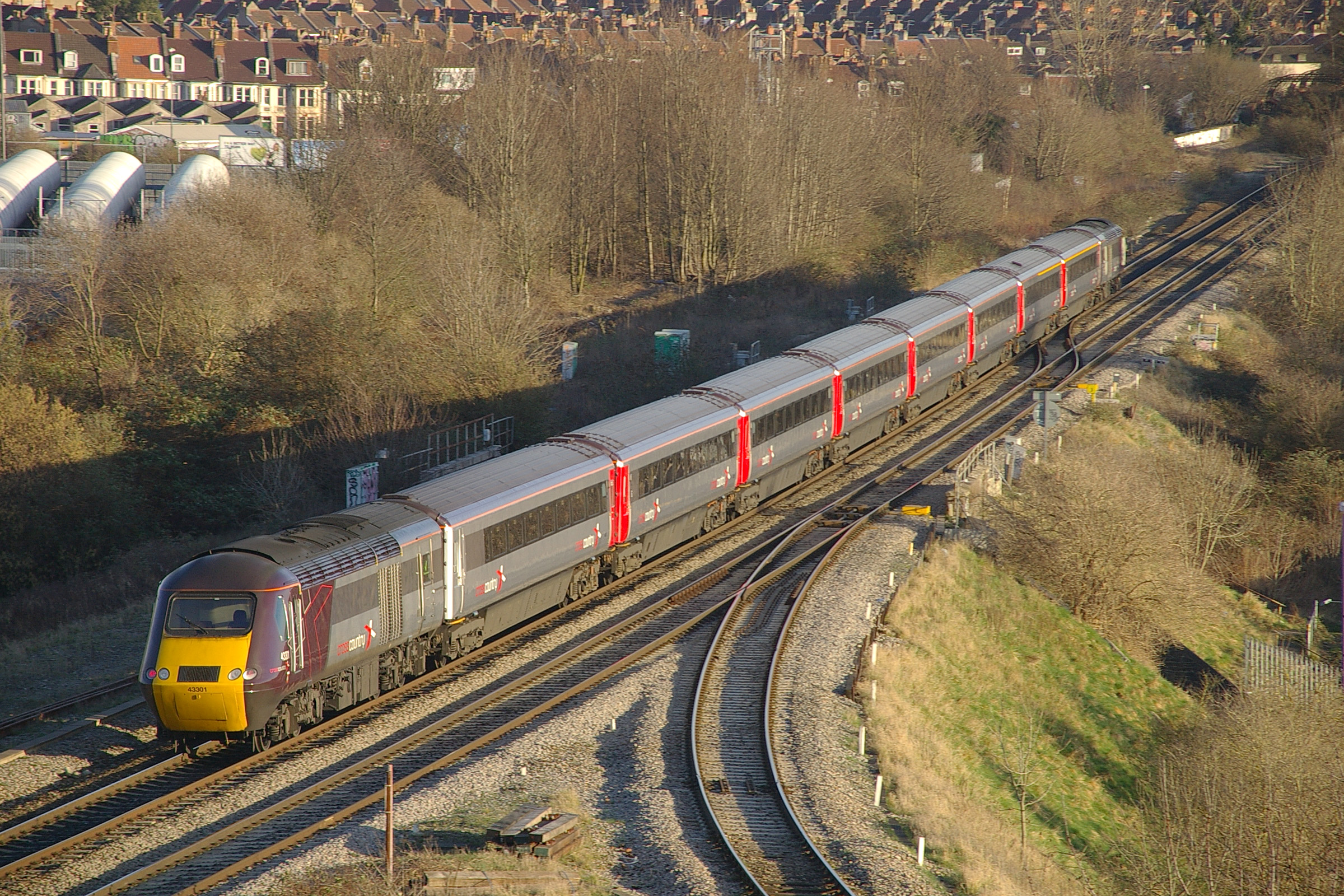
A southbound CrossCountry HST descending Filton Bank at Narroways Hill Junction in March 2009

Filton Bank is the name given to a 4 1/2-mile (7 km) section of the Bristol to Birmingham line in Bristol, England, roughly between Lawrence Hill and Filton Abbey Wood stations.

== Description ==
The line runs from Dr Days Junction where the Great Western Main Line branches off from the Bristol to Birmingham line just south of Lawrence Hill station, to Filton Junction just north of Filton Abbey Wood station where the South Wales Main Line branches off. The Severn Beach line branches off at Narroways Hill Junction. The 4 1/2-mile (7 km) line was returned to quadruple track for its full length in 2018.

== History ==
The line was built by the Bristol and South Wales Union Railway. It was four-tracked until 1984 when it was reduced to double track, with the running lines slewed over to increase line speeds. In late 2018 it was returned to four-track.

== Reinstatement ==
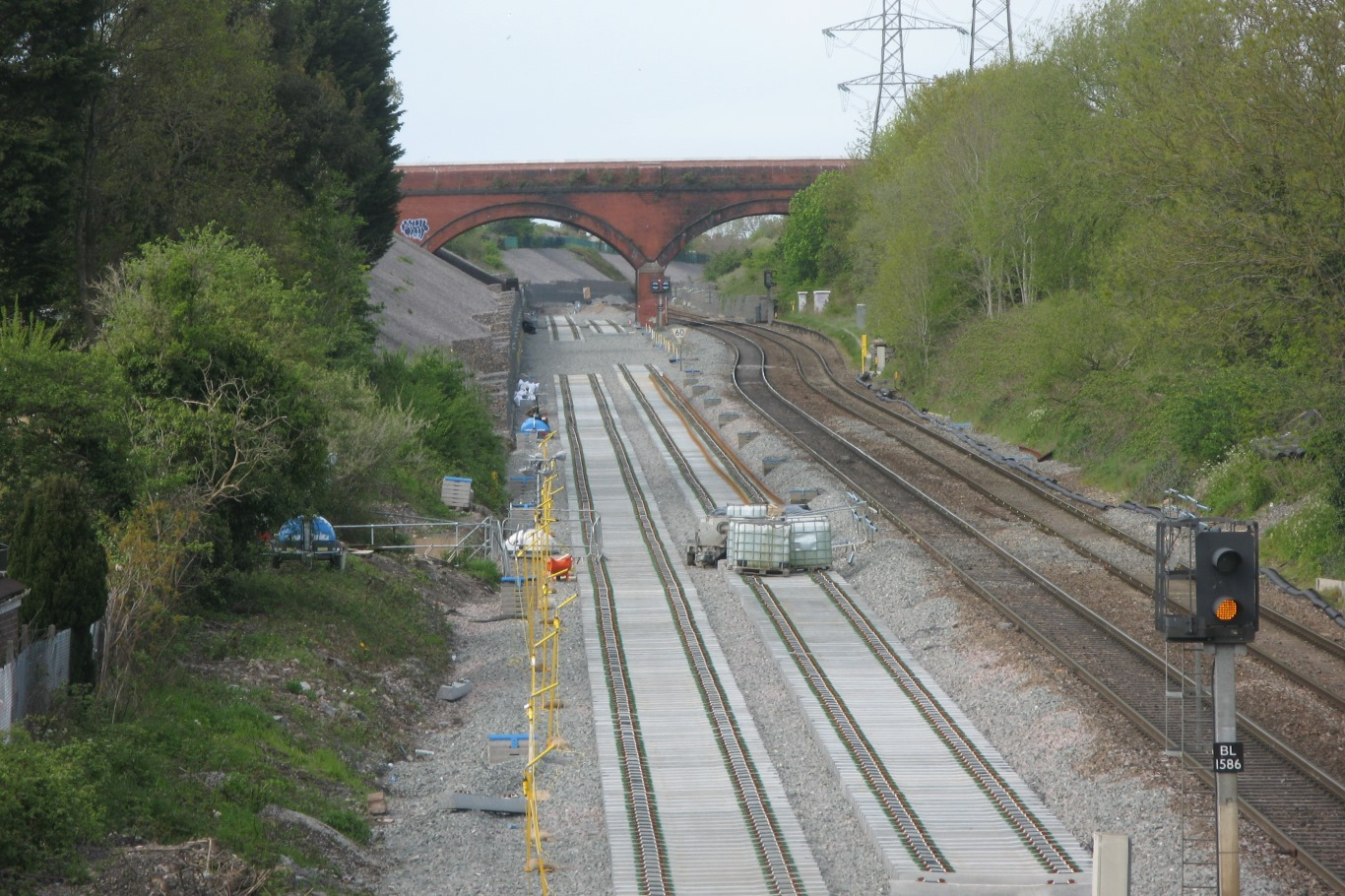
Work in 2018 to reinstate the two extra tracks at the site of Horfield railway station

It was announced in July 2012 that Filton Bank would be returned to a four-track layout. This would restore the separation between fast, main line services and stopping, relief line services, increasing capacity on the line. A fourth platform was built at Filton Abbey Wood station. It allowed services on the Severn Beach line to be increased to twice hourly, and the introduction of a twice hourly London Paddington to Bristol Temple Meads via Bristol Parkway service. The additional tracks were opened on 19 November 2018 with work scheduled to finish in 2019.

The line was planned to be electrified as part of the Great Western Main Line electrification scheme. In preparation for electrification, the footbridge at Stapleton Road was replaced to give room for overhead cables. In November 2016 it was announced that electrification on this section of line had been deferred due to cost overruns.

== See also ==
- Rail transport in Bristol
- MetroWest
- Friends of Suburban Bristol Railways
