= Supertram (disambiguation) =

The South Yorkshire Supertram is a light rail network in Sheffield, England.

Supertram may also refer to:

- Siemens-Duewag Supertram, the original tram vehicles used on South Yorkshire Supertram network
- Supertram Bridge (also known as Park Square Bridge) on the South Yorkshire Supertram network
- Bristol Supertram, a proposed but rejected tram system project for Bristol, England
- Leeds Supertram, a proposed but rejected modern tram system project for the city of Leeds, England

== See also ==
- Supertramp and Supertramp (disambiguation)
