= Ashley Down =

Suburb of Bristol, England

Coordinates: 51.48°N 2.58°W

- Location within Bristol
- OS grid reference: ST596756
- Unitary authority: Bristol
- Ceremonial county: Bristol
- Region: South West
- Country: England
- Sovereign state: United Kingdom
- Post town: BRISTOL
- Postcode district: BS7
- Dialling code: 0117
- Police: Avon and Somerset
- Fire: Avon
- Ambulance: South Western
- UK Parliament: Bristol North West

Ashley Down is a residential neighbourhood in the north of Bristol, England. It lies on high ground east of Bishopston, north of St Andrews and St Werburghs, west of Muller Road and south of Horfield. The main artery is Ashley Down Road. It is in the Bishopston and Ashley Down electoral ward of Bristol City Council.

Ashley Down was developed in Victorian times. A number of large detached villas were built on Ashley Down Road. Smaller terraced houses were built in the north of the district.

== Muller Homes ==
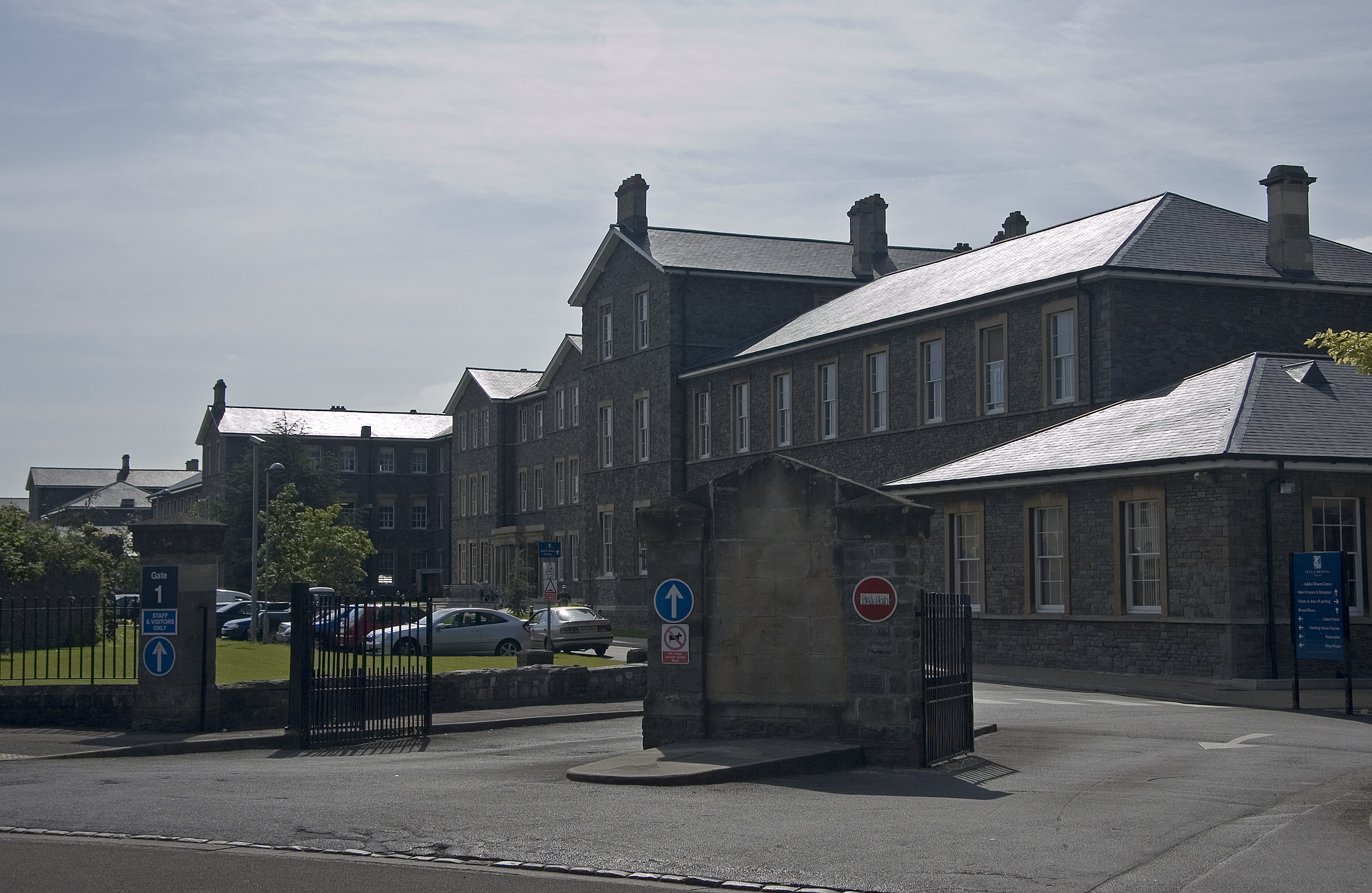
The college buildings on Ashley Down Road.

In 1845, George Müller entered into a contract for the purchase of 7 acres (28,000 m^{2}) of ground at £120 per acre (£0.03/m^{2}) for the accommodation, feeding, clothing and education of 300 destitute and orphan children. On 18 June 1849 the orphans transferred to the new building, designed by local architect Thomas Foster. By the time he died in 1898, Müller had received £1,500,000 through prayer and had over 10,000 children in his care.

The orphanage continued on the Ashley Down site until 1958. Orphan Houses 2, 4 and 5 are now owned by Bristol City College, while No 3 House (in which Müller lived for the last few years of his life and in which he died), on the other side of Ashley Down Road was converted into private flats in 2007. No 1 House is currently (2010) being redeveloped as flats.

In 1958, the buildings became Bristol College of Science and Technology (more recently changed to City of Bristol College, Brunel Campus). The site has been used as the film set for the BBC television series Casualty. Muller Road, which runs near the site of the orphanage, is named after its founder.

== County Cricket Ground ==
In 1889, W. G. Grace bought some land at Ashley Down, which became and remained the home of Gloucestershire County Cricket Club. The ground has a capacity of 8,000.

In July 2009, Gloucestershire C.C.C. announced plans to redevelop the ground into a 20,000 capacity stadium, including a "world class" media centre and conference facilities. The permanent capacity is 7,000 though temporary stands can increase the capacity to 17,500 for internationals. It hosted three games during the 2019 Cricket World Cup, and continues to host occasional limited-overs internationals.

Ashley Down Old Boys' RFC is a rugby club playing in Gloucestershire League I. They are members of the Bristol Combination.

== Transport ==
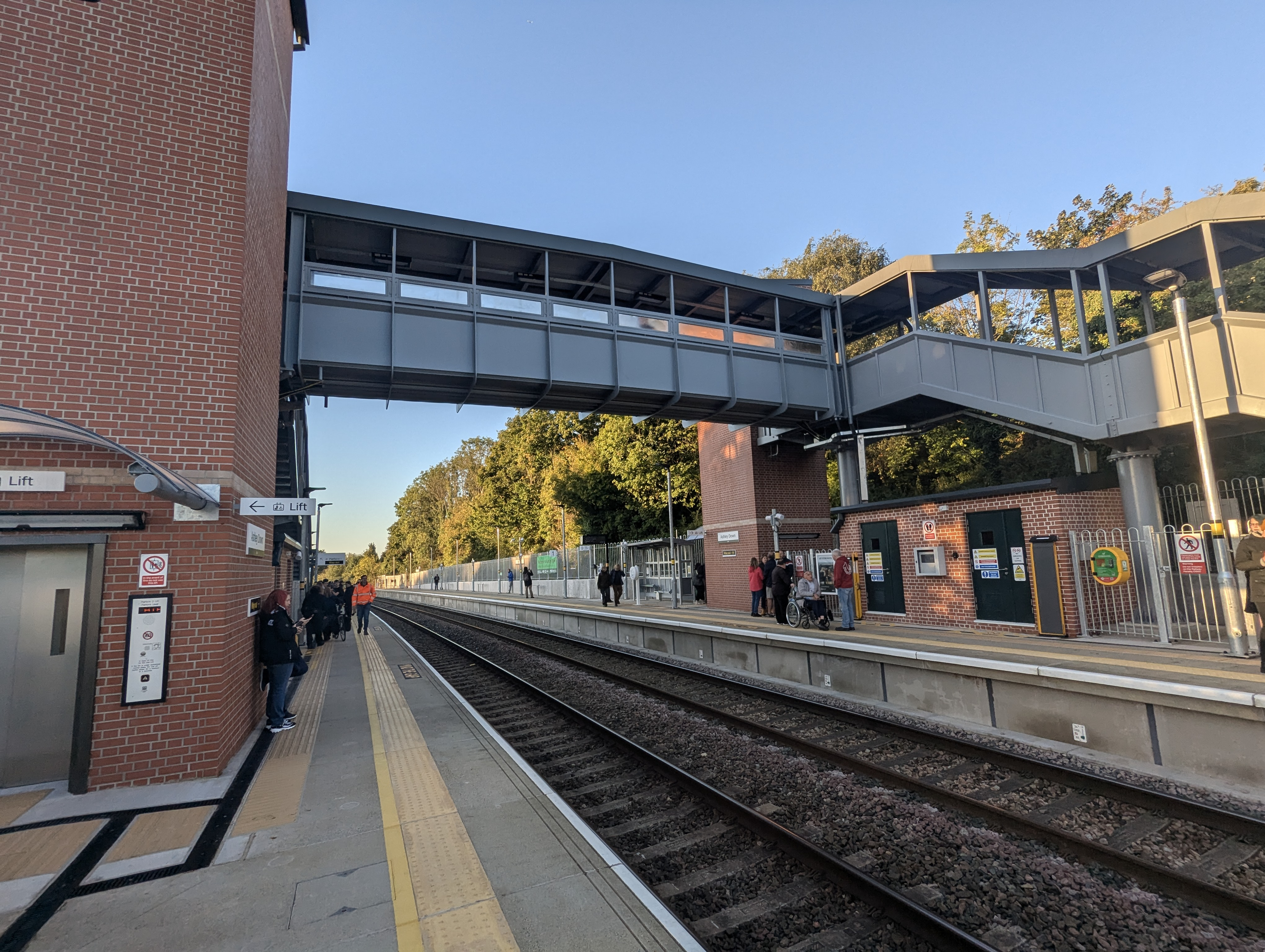
Ashley Down railway station

The neighbourhood is served by Ashley Down railway station, which opened in September 2024 and is part of the MetroWest rail improvement project with services operated by Great Western Railway. At the time of the station's opening, an hourly train service between Bristol Temple Meads and Filton Abbey Wood called at the station. Between 1864 and 1964, Ashley Down was served by Ashley Hill railway station, which was situated at the same location as the present Ashley Down station.
