= Ashley Down railway station =

Railway station in Bristol, England

Ashley Down
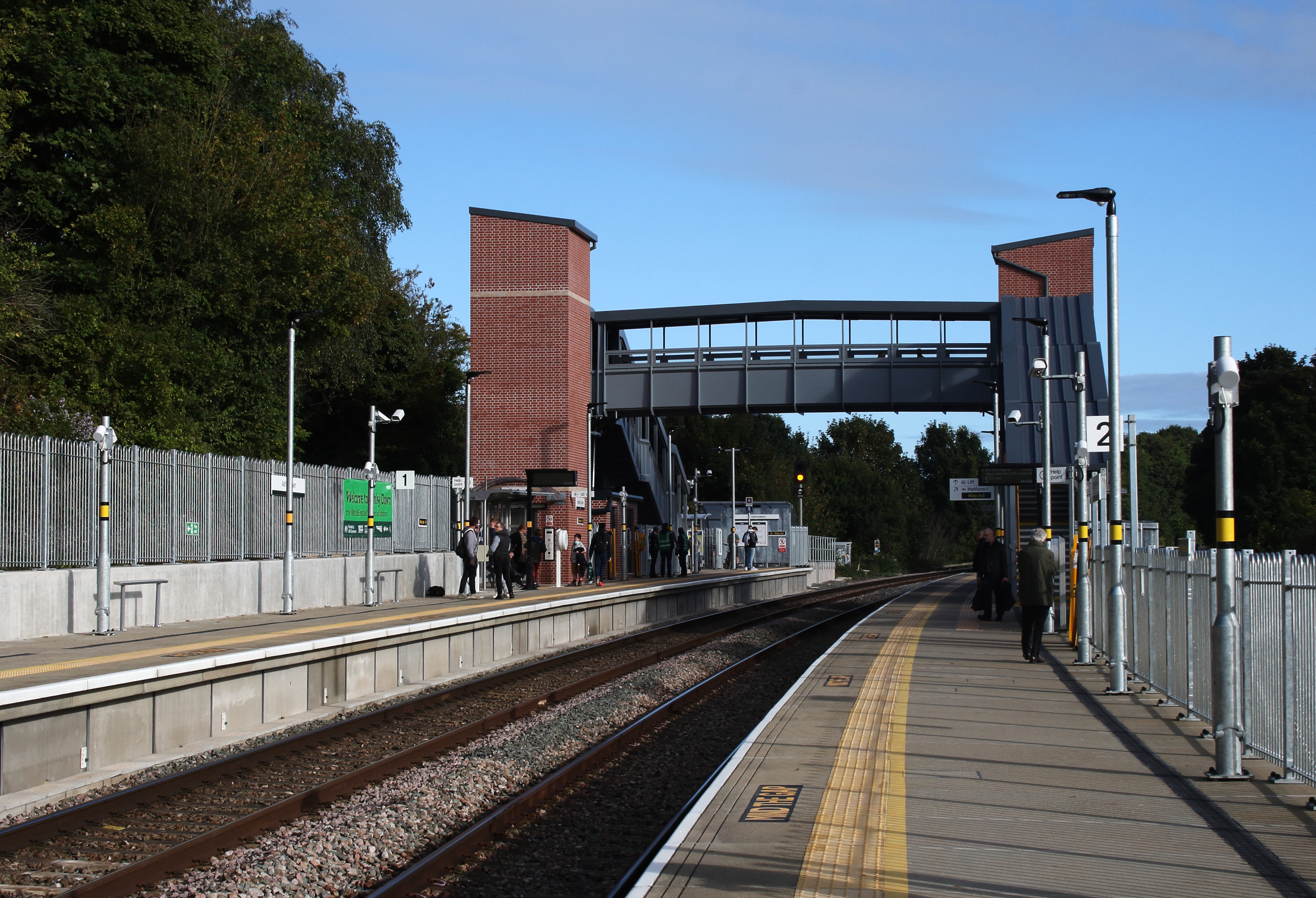

General information
- Location: Ashley Down, City of Bristol; England
- Coordinates: 51.4788°N 2.5767°W
- Managed by: Great Western Railway
- Platforms: 2
- Tracks: 4

Other information
- Station code: ASD

Key dates
- 1964: Ashley Hill closed
- 7 March 2023: Construction started
- 28 September 2024: Opened

Passengers
- 2024/25: ▲50,988
Location
Notes
- Passenger statistics from the Office of Rail and Road

Ashley Down railway station is a railway station in Bristol, England, serving the Ashley Down area. It opened on 28 September 2024.

The West of England Combined Authority planned to open a new railway station as part of the MetroWest scheme, on the site of the disused Ashley Hill station which had been closed in 1964. The reopening was supported by Bristol City Council, Network Rail, local MPs and local rail groups, and provides rail access to local colleges, the Memorial Stadium, home of Bristol Rovers Football Club, and to the County Ground, home of Gloucestershire County Cricket Club.

== History ==
Ashley Down was planned to have a stop on the Bristol Supertram, a light rail project which was cancelled in 2004; a 30-minute service had been planned between Broadmead shopping centre and North Bristol.

The new GWR station was initially ruled out by Network Rail due to modern regulations regarding the track gradient in stations, and because of the high cost of removing an embankment. However, in January 2018, it was reported that plans had been revived to reopen the station as part of the reopening of Henbury Spur.

Following the Bristol City Council meeting of 18 June 2019, the former Ashley Hill railway station, which closed in 1964, was cited as a station of main interest for the MetroWest project, with completion expected by 2023. Funding was given in January 2023 for the station, and construction started in March 2023. On 12 September 2024, the Office of Rail and Road authorised services from the station to commence on 28 September. The station was formally opened by Dan Norris, Mayor of the West of England, on 27 September.

== Services ==
The new station has hourly services to Filton Abbey Wood on the way north, and Stapleton Road, Lawrence Hill and Bristol Temple Meads on the way south. When the line is fully open, northbound trains will also call at Bristol Brabazon and Henbury.

Preceding station	National Rail	Following station
Filton Abbey Wood	Great Western Railway; MetroWest (Bristol)	Stapleton Road
