= Bristol and South Wales Union Railway =

Railway between England and Wales

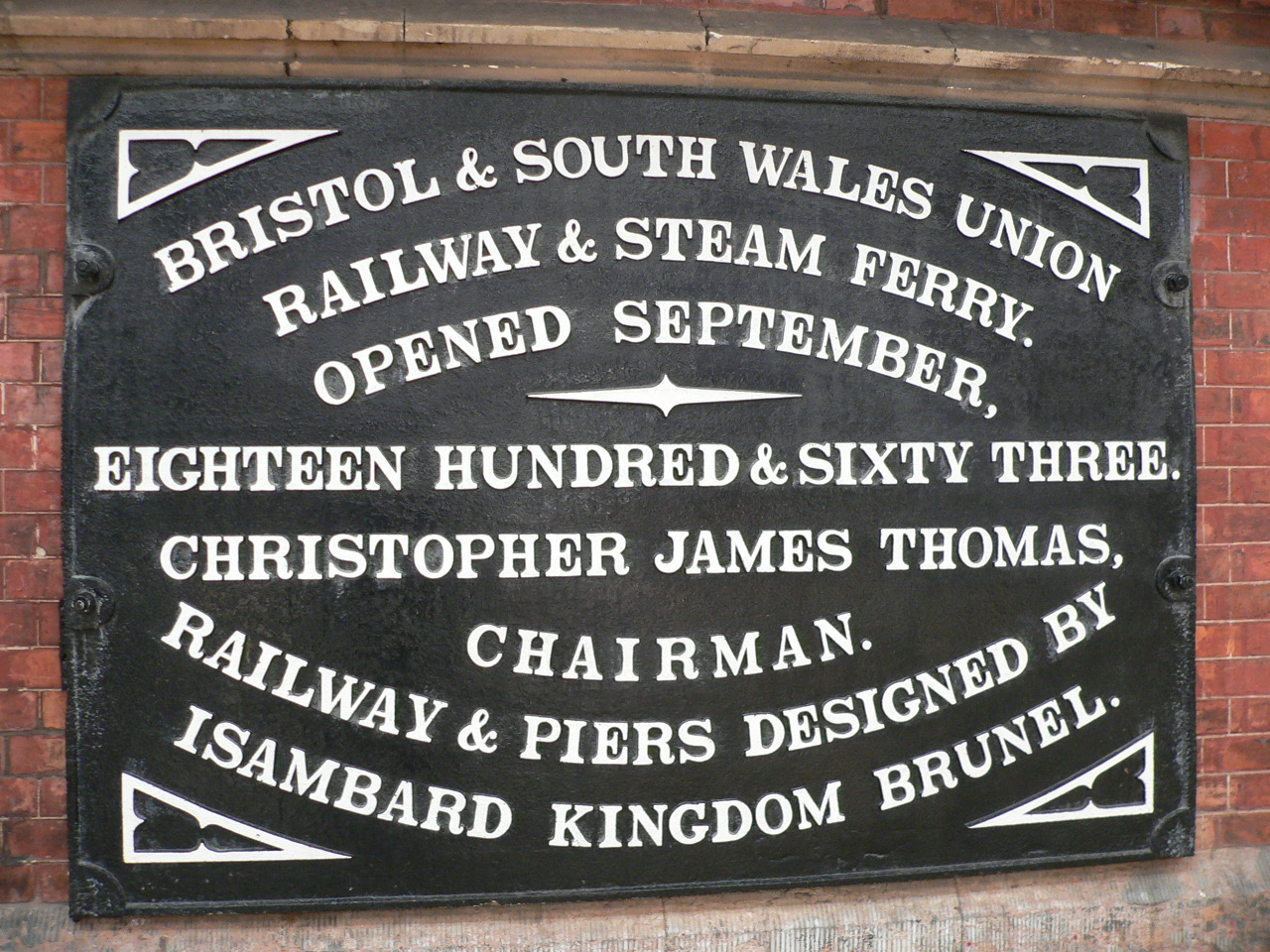
A commemorative plaque at Bristol Temple Meads.

The Bristol and South Wales Union Railway was built to connect Bristol, England, with south Wales. The route involved a ferry crossing of the River Severn but was considerably shorter than the alternative route through Gloucester. The ferry was replaced by the Severn Tunnel in 1886 but part of the route continues to be used, forming parts of the Cross-Country Route and the South Wales Main Line.

== History ==
=== Construction and independent operation ===
Bristol and South Wales Junction Railway Act 1846
- Act of Parliament
- Parliament of the United Kingdom
- Long title: An Act for making a Railway Communication between the City of Bristol and the proposed South Wales Railway in the County of Monmouth, with a Branch Railway therefrom.
- Citation: 9 & 10 Vict. c. cv
- Territorial extent: United Kingdom

Dates
- Royal assent: 26 June 1846
- Commencement: 26 June 1846 (Note: The Acts of Parliament (Commencement) Act 1793.)
- Repealed: 31 January 2013

Other legislation
- Repealed by: Statute Law (Repeals) Act 2013

Status: Repealed

A "Bristol and South Wales Junction Railway" was authorised by an act of Parliament, the Bristol and South Wales Junction Railway Act 1846 (9 & 10 Vict. c. cv). Isambard Kingdom Brunel surveyed a route across the Severn and the ferry at New Passage was purchased under authority of the Bristol and South Wales Junction Railway and Aust Ferry Act 1847 (10 & 11 Vict. c. lxxxi), but the line failed to raise enough money so was not built.

Bristol and South Wales Union Act 1857 (Note: Section 3.)
- Act of Parliament
- Parliament of the United Kingdom
- Long title: An Act for making Railways between the City of Bristol and the South Wales Railway in the County of Monmouth with a Steam Ferry across the River Severn in connexion therewith, for the Purpose of improving the Railway Communication between South Wales and Bristol, Southampton, and the South-western Districts of England.
- Citation: 20 & 21 Vict. c. 54
- Territorial extent: United Kingdom

Dates
- Royal assent: 27 July 1857
- Commencement: 27 July 1857

Status: Current legislation

Text of statute as originally enacted

Bristol and South Wales Union Railway Act 1861
- Act of Parliament
- Parliament of the United Kingdom
- Long title: An Act to grant further Powers to the Bristol and South Wales Union Railway Company with reference to their Capital and Borrowing Powers; to extend the Periods limited for Completion of the Works; to amend the Act relating to the Company; and for other Purposes.
- Citation: 24 & 25 Vict. c. ii
- Territorial extent: United Kingdom

Dates
- Royal assent: 17 May 1861
- Commencement: 17 May 1861

Status: Current legislation

Bristol and South Wales Union Railway Act 1862 (Note: Section 1.)
- Act of Parliament
- Parliament of the United Kingdom
- Long title: An Act to enable the Bristol and South Wales Union Railway Company to construct a Branch Railway to communicate with a Pier and other Works at the Mouth of the River Avon; and to authorize certain Arrangements with the Mayor, Aldermen, and Burgesses of the City and County of Bristol with reference thereto.
- Citation: 25 & 26 Vict. c. cxlix
- Territorial extent: United Kingdom

Dates
- Royal assent: 17 July 1862
- Commencement: 17 July 1862

Status: Current legislation

Text of statute as originally enacted

Bristol and South Wales Union Railway Act 1864
- Act of Parliament
- Parliament of the United Kingdom
- Long title: An Act to extend the Time for the Purchase of Land and completing the Extension Line to the River Avon of the Bristol and South Wales Union Railway; to authorize the Purchase of additional Lands; and for other Purposes.
- Citation: 27 & 28 Vict. c. cxxxvi
- Territorial extent: United Kingdom

Dates
- Royal assent: 30 June 1864
- Commencement: 30 June 1864

Status: Current legislation

Text of statute as originally enacted

The "Bristol, South Wales and Southampton Union Railway" proposed in 1854 to carry a line through the centre of Bristol and along the Avon Gorge to New Passage, where a train ferry would cross the water. This became the "Bristol and South Wales Union Railway" (B&SWUR). The Bristol and South Wales Union Act 1857 (20 & 21 Vict. c. 54) was passed on 27 July 1857 authorising a route to the east and north of Bristol. Brunel died in 1859 and the works were completed by Robert Pearson Brereton.

Construction started in 1858 and the single-track 7 ft (2,134 mm) broad gauge line opened from South Wales Junction, half a mile east of Temple Meads, as far as the landward end of New Passage Pier on 8 September 1863, a distance of 11 miles (18 km). The distance by rail between Bristol and Cardiff was reduced from 94 miles (151 km) to 38 miles (61 km). Stations were opened at Lawrence Hill, Stapleton Road, Filton, Patchway, Pilning and New Passage. The short section on the opposite side of the Severn officially opened on 1 January 1864. On 13 August 1864 Ashley Hill station was opened between Stapleton Road and Filton.

In 1868 the B&SWUR was amalgamated with the Great Western Railway (GWR) which had operated its trains from the outset.

=== Subsequent history ===
Under GWR ownership, the Portskewett branch was converted to 4 ft 8 1/2 in (1,435 mm) standard gauge on 13 May 1872 along with all the other broad gauge lines on that side of the river. The Bristol section was closed for one day on 8 August 1873 and reopened the following day as a standard gauge line.

On 1 October 1874 a junction was put in at Narroways Hill, just north of Stapleton Road railway station, to connect the GWR with the Clifton Extension Railway, a joint venture with the Midland Railway to serve the affluent Clifton district. The line from Temple Meads to Narroways Hill Junction was doubled at the same time.

Work had started on the Severn Tunnel a little way downstream from New Passage in 1872 and sidings were laid at both Portskewett and New Passage in connection with sinking shafts to the tunnel workings. On 29 May 1886 a curve was opened near South Wales Junction (between Dr Day's Junction and North Somerset Junction) to allow trains to run directly from London to the new Tunnel. The line between Narroways Hill Junction and Patchway was also doubled to carry the heavier traffic. Just short of Pilning railway station the new route diverged to south and a new station was built. The ferry and Pilning-New Passage line ceased operation after 30 November 1886 and the tunnel opened for passenger trains the following day, although goods trains had already been using the new route. A new 1,440 yards (1,320 m) single track tunnel alongside the old tunnel at Almondsbury carried the Up line on a more gentle gradient from 1887. The increased traffic caused the line from Dr Day's Junction to Narroways Hill Junction to be widened to four tracks in 1891.

The B&SWUR had been authorised to construct a line from Pilning to a proposed new dock at Avonmouth in 1862, but neither the dock nor railway was built. The GWR reopened a section of the old line for goods traffic on 5 February 1900, this ran from Pilning to New Passage and then connected with a new route to Avonmouth railway station. Passenger trains ran from Avonmouth as far as a new Severn Beach railway station from 10 July 1922, and continued to new stations at New Passage and Pilning (known as "Pilning Low Level") from 9 July 1928. The service was withdrawn from 23 November 1964.

== Stations ==
- Bristol Temple Meads was the Great Western Railway terminus in Bristol opened on 8 August 1840 and is still the largest station in the city.
- Lawrence Hill opened with the B&SWUR on 8 September 1863 and is still served by Severn Beach Line and other local services.
- Stapleton Road opened with the B&SWUR on 8 September 1863 and is still served by Severn Beach Line and other local services.
- Ashley Hill was additional station opened by the B&SWUR on 13 August 1864 and closed on 23 November 1964. It was rebuilt as Ashley Down in 2024.
- Horfield was opened by the GWR on 14 May 1927 and closed on 23 November 1964.
- Filton opened with the B&SWUR on 8 September 1863. It was closed on 1 July 1903 to be replaced by a new Filton Junction station, but this in turn has been replaced by Filton Abbey Wood railway station back on the original site and is served by local services on the Bristol to Cardiff and Bristol to Gloucester routes.
- Patchway opened with the B&SWUR on 8 September 1863 and is still served by train services between Bristol and Cardiff.
- Pilning opened with the B&SWUR on 8 September 1863 but closed when the Severn Tunnel opened on 1 December 1886.
- Pilning Low Level was opened by the GWR for the Severn Beach circular service on 9 August 1928 and closed on 23 November 1964.
- Cross Hands Halt was opened by the GWR for the Severn Beach circular service on 9 August 1928 and closed on 23 November 1964.
- New Passage Halt was opened by the GWR for the Severn Beach circular service on 9 August 1928 and closed on 23 November 1964.
- New Passage opened with the line on 8 September 1863 and closed when the Severn Tunnel opened on 1 December 1886.
- New Passage Pier opened with the B&SWUR on 8 September 1863 and closed when the Severn Tunnel opened on 1 December 1886.
- Portskewett Pier was opened by the B&SWUR on 1 January 1864 and closed when the Severn Tunnel opened on 1 December 1886.
- Portskewett was opened with the B&SWUR on 8 September 1863 but now closed.

== Ferries ==
Two steam ferries had crossed the River Severn near Aust for many years before the coming of the railway. The upper ferry between Old Passage and Beachley continued as before but the lower ferry, about 2 miles (3.2 km) away at New Passage, was sold to the Bristol and South Wales Junction Railway in 1847. The Bristol and South Wales Union Railway eventually built new piers for the ferry, that at New Passage being 546 yards (499 m) long and that at Portskewett just 258 yards (236 m). On the night of 21 May 1881 Portskewett Pier was badly damaged by a fire; it was reopened on 16 June 1881, during which time a limited train service between Bristol and Cardiff was operated over the Bristol and Gloucester line of the Midland Railway.

A steam ferry, the Saint Pierre had been built by Pride and Williams for the New Passage crossing in 1825 and it worked there until 1831. The B&SWUR bought a new steamer, the Gem in 1863 but it proved unsuitable and was soon replaced by the Relief. John Bland, a carrier and shareholder in the railway, was contracted to operate the ferry. The next vessel purchased was the Dragon Fly, this had been used by the contractors to build the piers but was too small to work as the ferry. Instead, two paddle tugs, the Ajax and the Atlas were hired in to cover for the Relief.

A new paddle steamer arrived in June 1864, named Christopher Thomas after the chairman of the B&SWUR, it had been built for the company by Henderson, Coulborn and Company at Renfrew in Scotland. A slightly larger vessel named the Chepstow arrived from the same shipyard on 11 February 1875. These two continued in service until the Severn Tunnel was opened in 1886. They were sold to WS Ogden at Cardiff in 1880, the Chepstow being renamed the Rover. The funnels were generally painted black with a red band.

Paddle steamer	Period	Length	Gross tons	HP
Gem	1863	122.2 feet (37.2 m)	100	50
Relief	1863–1864	117.6 feet (35.8 m)	163	70
Christopher Thomas	1864–1886	132.0 feet (40.2 m)	159	100
Chepstow	1875–1886	140.6 feet (42.9 m)	188	100
