= Ashley Hill railway station =

Disused railway station in Ashley Down, Bristol

Ashley Hill
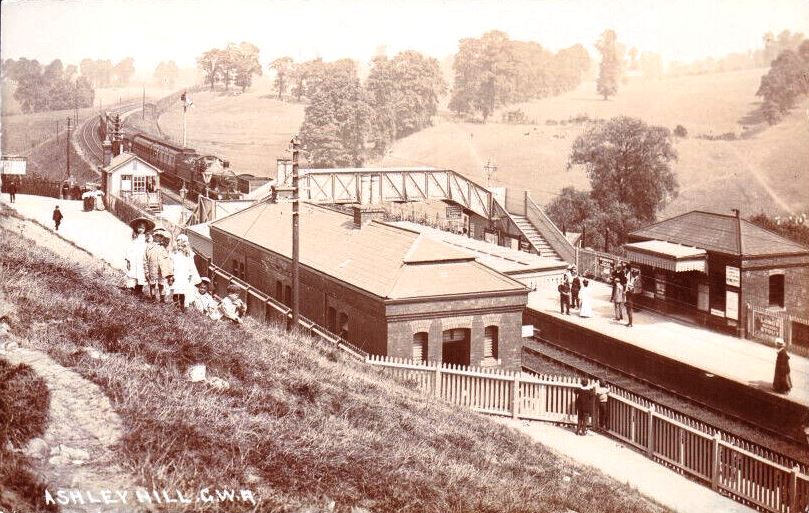
- Postcard of Ashley Hill station, c.1910

General information
- Location: Ashley Down, Bristol; England
- Coordinates: 51.4783°N 2.5768°W

History
- Original company: Bristol and South Wales Union Railway
- Pre-grouping: Great Western Railway
- Post-grouping: Great Western Railway

Key dates
- 13 June 1864: Station opens
- 23 November 1964: Station closes
- 28 September 2024: Reopened as Ashley Down
Location

Ashley Hill railway station was a railway station serving the area of Ashley Down in the north of Bristol, England, between 1864 and 1964. It was on what is now known as Filton Bank, and was served by stopping trains to Severn Beach (via Pilning), Avonmouth (via Chittening) and Swindon (via Badminton). The West of England Combined Authority opened a new station, Ashley Down, on the same site in September 2024.

== History ==
The station was opened in 1864 by the Bristol and South Wales Union Railway, which was absorbed by the Great Western Railway in 1868. The station passed to the Western Region of British Railways on nationalisation in 1948. It was closed by the British Railways Board in 1964.

In 2001, the station was selected to be reopened as Ashley Down and used as a stop for the proposed Bristol Supertram project. A 30-minute service was planned between Broadmead Shopping Centre and North Bristol, but the project was cancelled in 2004.

Preceding station	Historical railways	Following station
Stapleton Road; Line and station open	Great Western Railway; Bristol and South Wales Union Railway	Horfield; Line open, station closed

== The site today ==
Construction of the new Ashley Down station on the National Rail network started in March 2023, as part of the MetroWest project. Services from the station commenced in September 2024.

== Bibliography ==
- Butt, R. V. J. (October 1995). The Directory of Railway Stations: details every public and private passenger station, halt, platform and stopping place, past and present (1st ed.). Sparkford: Patrick Stephens Ltd. ISBN 978-1-85260-508-7. OCLC 60251199. OL 11956311M.
- Jowett, Alan (2000). Jowett's Nationalised Railway Atlas (1st ed.). Penryn, Cornwall: Atlantic Transport Publishers. ISBN 978-0-906899-99-1. OCLC 228266687.
