= Lawrence Hill railway station =

Railway station in Bristol, England

Lawrence Hill
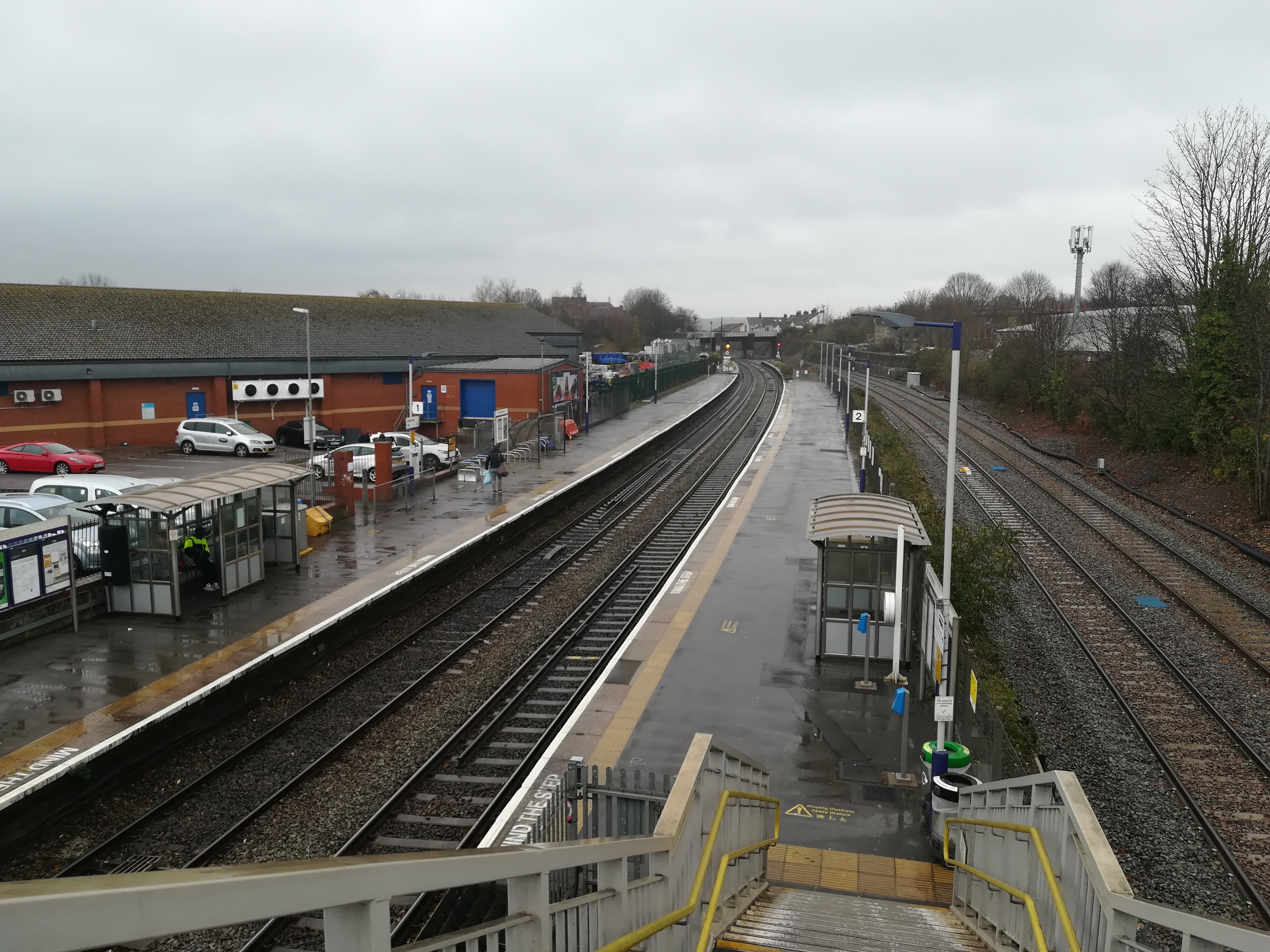

General information
- Location: Lawrence Hill, Bristol; England
- Coordinates: 51.4582°N 2.5644°W
- Grid reference: ST609734
- Manager: Great Western Railway
- Platforms: 2
- Tracks: 4

Other information
- Station code: LWH
- Classification: DfT category F2

History
- Original company: Bristol and South Wales Union Railway
- Pre-grouping: Great Western Railway
- Post-grouping: Great Western Railway

Key dates
- 8 September 1863: Opened
- 1874: Second platform opened
- 1891: Third and fourth platforms opened
- 29 November 1965: Closed to goods traffic

Passengers
- 2021/22: ▲0.153 million
- 2022/23: ▲0.209 million
- 2023/24: ▲0.287 million
- 2024/25: ▲0.340 million
- 2025/26: ▲0.373 million
Location
Notes
- Passenger statistics from the Office of Rail and Road

Lawrence Hill railway station is on the Severn Beach Line and Cross Country Route, serving the inner-city districts of Easton and Lawrence Hill in Bristol, England. It is 1.0 mile (1.6 km) from Bristol Temple Meads. Its three letter station code is LWH. The station has two platforms, four running lines and minimal facilities. It is managed by Great Western Railway, the seventh company to be responsible for the station and the third franchise since privatisation in 1997. This company provides all train services at the station, the standard service being two trains per hour along the Severn Beach Line and an hourly service between Bristol Temple Meads and Filton Abbey Wood.

The station was opened in 1863 by the Bristol and South Wales Union Railway, with a single track and platform. The line was doubled in 1874 when the Clifton Extension Railway opened, then expanded to four tracks and platforms in 1891. There were buildings on all platforms and a goods yard to the west. Service levels reduced significantly over the second half of the twentieth century. The goods facilities were closed in 1965, staff were withdrawn in 1967 and the eastern two platforms were taken out of service by 1974.

The line is due to be electrified as part of the 21st-century modernisation of the Great Western Main Line, which will also see the addition of two new running lines to increase capacity. Service frequency will be improved as part of the Greater Bristol Metro scheme.

== Description ==
Lawrence Hill railway station serves the Lawrence Hill and Easton areas of Bristol. The surrounding area is primarily residential, with the City Academy school to the east and a First West of England bus depot to the north-west. A supermarket and industrial estate occupy the old goods yard directly west of the station. The station is on the Cross Country Route between Bristol Temple Meads and Bristol Parkway, and on the Severn Beach Line from Bristol Temple Meads to Severn Beach, 1 mile 4 chains (1.7 km) from Bristol Temple Meads. (Note: Railways in the United Kingdom are, for historical reasons, measured in miles and chains. There are 80 chains to the mile.) The next station north is Stapleton Road, the next station south is Bristol Temple Meads.

The station is on an alignment of 012 degrees, curving towards the east. There are a pair of tracks between the two station platforms: the western platform (platform 1) serves northbound trains, and the eastern platform (platform 2) serves southbound trains. Platform 1 is 228 metres (249 yd) long and platform 2 is 234 metres (256 yd) long; however, both have the northern ends of the platform fenced off, giving operational platform lengths of 116 metres (127 yd) and 114 metres (125 yd) respectively. Platform 2 was part of an "island" platform which, along with a further platform to the east, served the northbound "Up Filton Main" southbound "Down Filton Main" lines. These platforms were removed around 1970, the fast lines were removed in 1984 and reinstated in 2018 as part of the Filton Bank improvements. Directly to the south of the station, the A420 Church Road crosses the railway on a bridge. The main access to the station is using steps from Church Road, however the northbound platform can be accessed step-free from the adjacent supermarket car park. There is no step-free access to the southbound platform. To the north is a bridge carrying the Bristol and Bath Railway Path, a cycle path built on the trackbed of the Midland Railway Bristol to Gloucester line. Just north of this bridge was Lawrence Hill Junction, where a goods line used to diverge to the west to serve a waste terminal. To the south there are crossover points between the four tracks.

As of 2025 facilities at the station are minimal. Although the station is unstaffed, there is a machine for buying tickets. There are metal and glass shelters and seating on each of the two platforms, as well as customer help points which give next train information and allow the user to contact a helpdesk. The station is covered by CCTV. There is no car park or taxi rank, but there are 12 bicycle stands on the platform. The nearest bus stop is directly outside the station on the A420 Church Road.

The lines through Lawrence Hill have a speed limit of 75 miles per hour (121 km/h) except the northbound line through platform 1 of 60 miles per hour (97 km/h). The loading gauge is W8, and around 2010 the line handled over 15 million train tonnes per year. It was planned that the lines would be electrified by 2017 as part of the 21st-century modernisation of the Great Western Main Line, however this was cancelled due to cost overruns.

== Services ==
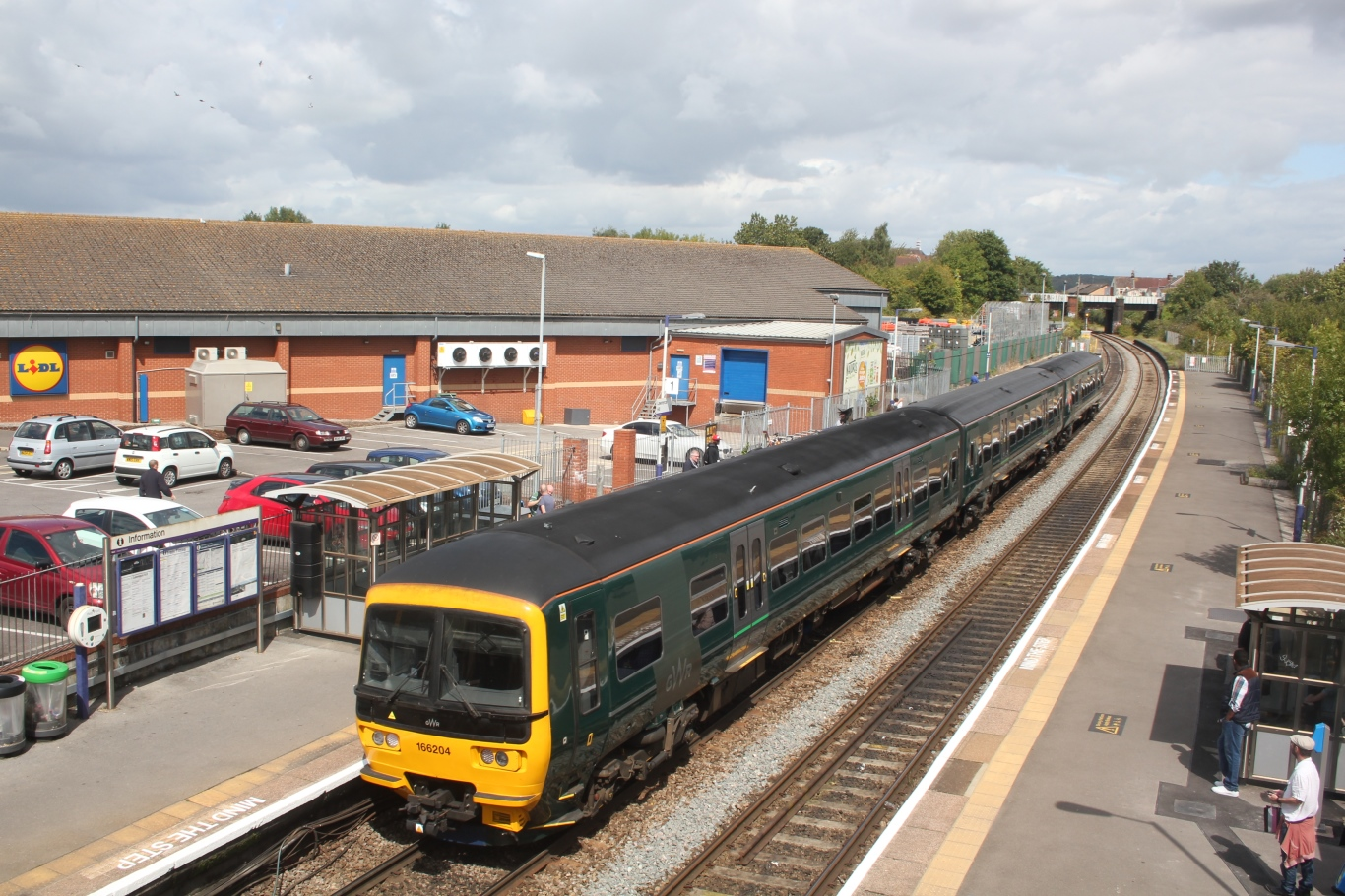
Class 166 at Lawrence Hill with an Avonmouth service

All services at Lawrence Hill are operated by Great Western Railway using Class 150 and 158 Sprinter and 166 Turbo DMUs.

The typical off-peak service in trains per hour is:

- 3 tph to Bristol Temple Meads of which 1 continues to Weston-super-Mare
- 1 tph to Filton Abbey Wood
- 2 tph to Avonmouth of which 1 continues to Severn Beach

During the peak hours, the station is also served by a number of services to Bristol Parkway, Cardiff Central and Taunton.

On Sundays, the services to Avonmouth and Severn Beach are reduced to hourly. Southbound a single afternoon service continues beyond Bristol to Exeter St Davids via Weston-super-Mare.

Express services, operated by CrossCountry pass through the station but do not stop.

Preceding station	National Rail	Following station
Stapleton Road	Great Western Railway Cross Country Route	Bristol Temple Meads
Stapleton Road	Great Western Railway Severn Beach Line	Bristol Temple Meads

== History ==
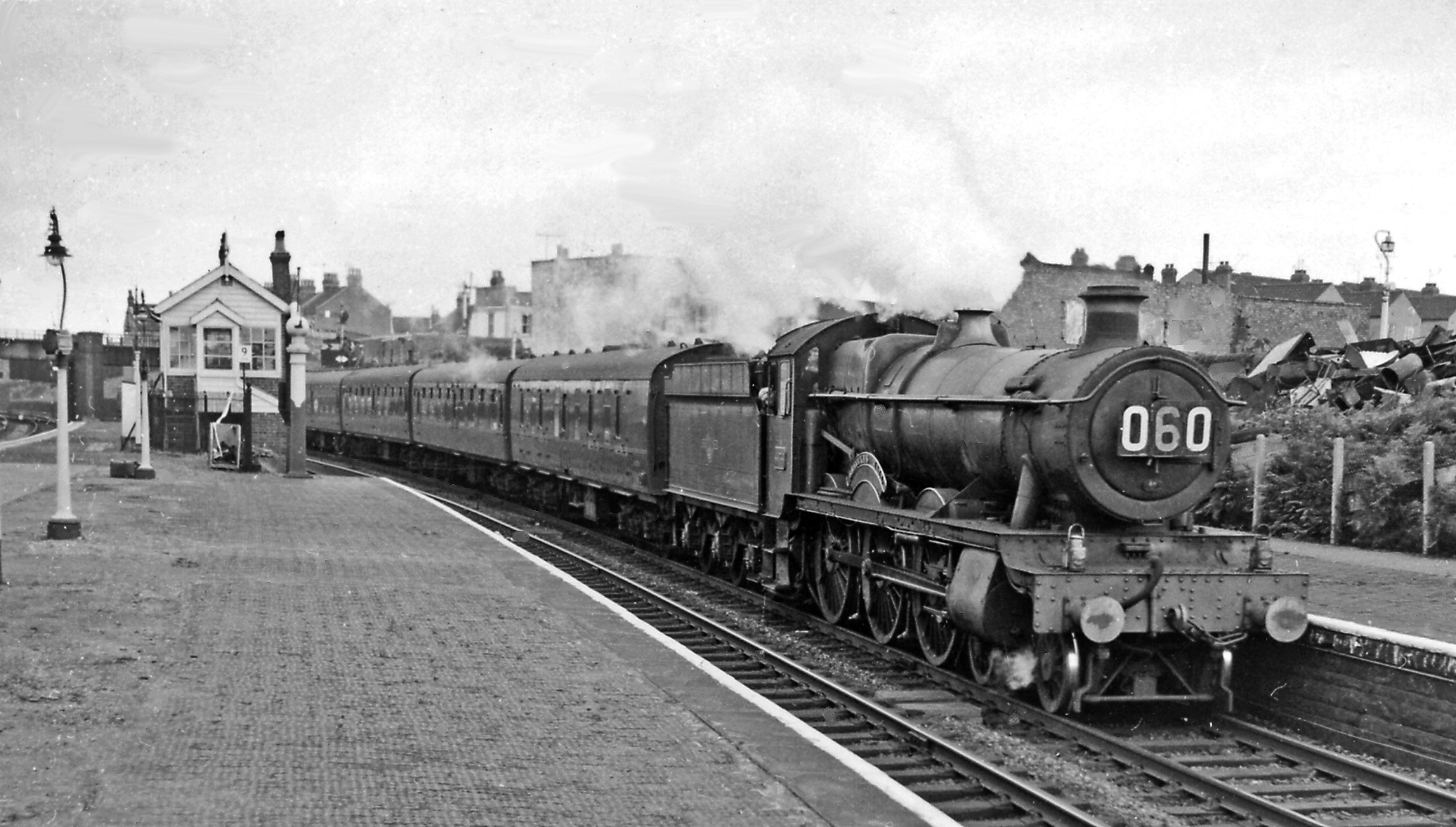
A Cardiff-Portsmouth express passes through Lawrence Hill in 1962. The signal box is visible on the left.

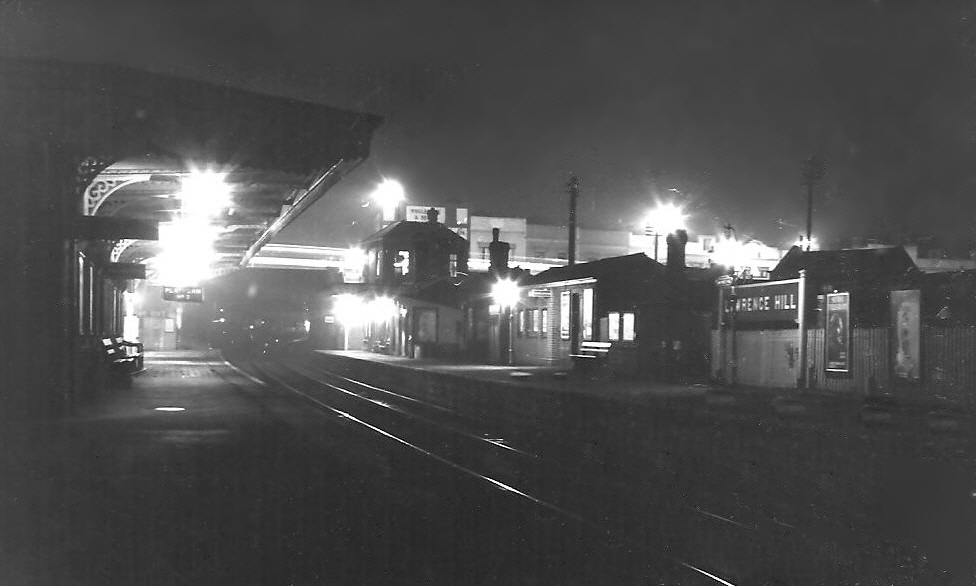
The station in 1964, looking south towards Church Road. This is the western two platforms.

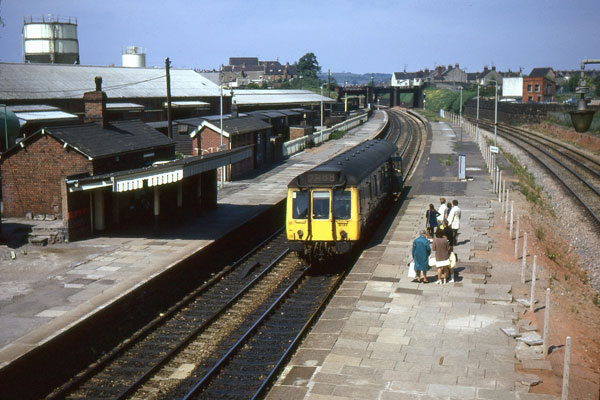
In 1974, a Class 121 DMU calls at Lawrence Hill with a southbound Severn Beach Line service. The eastern lines were still in use at this time, but the platforms serving them had been demolished.

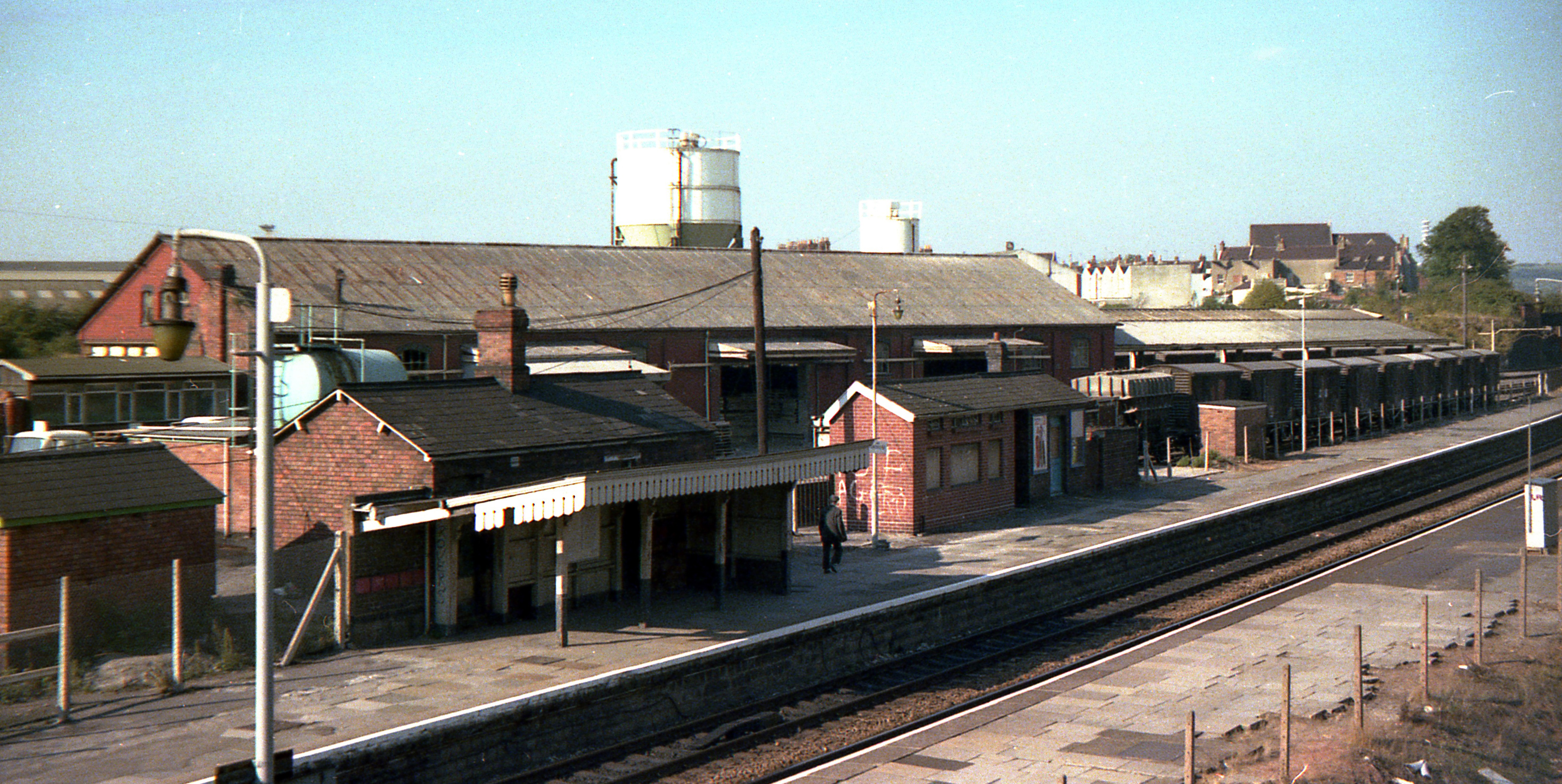
The station in 1979, showing the buildings on the western platform.

Lawrence Hill opened on 8 September 1863 when services began on the Bristol and South Wales Union Railway (BSWUR), which ran from Bristol Temple Meads to New Passage Pier, north of the city on the banks of the River Severn. At New Passage, passengers were transferred to a ferry to cross the Severn to continue on into Wales. In 1874, the Clifton Extension Railway opened, connecting the Bristol Port Railway and Pier to the Great Western Railway at Narroways Hill Junction, north of Stapleton Road. To cope with the expected increase in traffic, the line was doubled, and a second platform was added to the east of the two tracks. Two more tracks were added in 1891, giving a layout of two sets of two tracks, with platforms on the outside and on an island in the middle. Trains to and from Clifton Down and Avonmouth used the western platforms while trains to and from South Wales used the eastern platforms. There were buildings on all the platforms, which were linked by a large covered footbridge. There was a goods yard to the west of the station and a signal box on the central platform.

In 1886, the daily Great Western service along the Clifton Extension Railway was 6 trains each way between Avonmouth and Temple Meads, 24 trains from Clifton Down to Temple Meads and 26 the other direction. By 1910 there were 17 services daily from Avonmouth to Temple Meads and 15 the other way, a further 20 trains each day operating between Clifton Down and Temple Meads. From 1924, many trains to Avonmouth were extended to Severn Beach, a growing seaside resort, and some on to Pilning, then back to Temple Meads via Patchway. Circular trips via Henbury were also common. The station was also used by excursion trains, and by trains of evacuees during the Second World War. By 1947, just before the start of the British Rail era, there were 33 daily services each direction between Avonmouth and Temple Meads, and 18 on Sundays. Many trains would pass through Lawrence Hill non-stop - in 1930, 350 trains would pass the station each day, of which roughly 40% would stop.

When the railways were nationalised in 1948, Lawrence Hill came under the control of the Western Region of British Railways, which oversaw a gradual decline of services at Lawrence Hill. Passenger numbers along the Clifton Extension Railway, now known as the Severn Beach Line, also dropped, and in 1963 the Beeching report suggested that all services along the line be withdrawn. In the end, services continued to Severn Beach but were discontinued via Henbury and Pilning. Staff were withdrawn from the station from 17 July 1967 as a cost-saving measure. The footbridge was demolished by 1970, forcing passengers to change platform via the steps to Church Road at the south end of the station. Most of the station buildings were demolished in August 1970, but there were still some on the westernmost platform in 1979. By 1974 the platforms serving the eastern tracks had been removed, with the tracks themselves removed in 1984. Plans to use the disused trackbed as part of a light rail scheme linking the city centre to the northern suburbs were formed in the late 1990s, with the aim of an operational scheme by 2008, but the plans had been shelved by 2004. It was suggested in 2008 that the trackbed could be used as a cycle path to join together communities which had been separated by the construction of the M32 motorway, however this was dropped due to Network Rail asserting that the trackbed might be necessary for future rail expansion.

British Rail was split into business-led sectors in the 1980s, at which time operations at Stapleton Road passed to Regional Railways. All trains along the Severn Beach Line ran to Severn Beach, but the service pattern was irregular. This was changed in the mid-1990s, with a more frequent service to Avonmouth but very few on to Severn Beach and no Sunday services. When the railway was privatised in 1997, local services were franchised to Wales & West, which was succeeded by Wessex Trains, an arm of National Express, in 2001. Services along the Severn Beach Line were increased to 10 per day in each direction by 2005, with Bristol City Council providing a subsidy to Wessex Trains. The Wessex franchise was amalgamated with the Great Western franchise into the Greater Western franchise from 2006, and responsibility passed to First Great Western, a subsidiary company of FirstGroup, which was rebranded in 2015 as Great Western Railway. A minimum service requirement was written into the franchise agreement, ensuring an hourly service along the Severn Beach Line. Passenger traffic increased significantly, and in 2010, Sunday services to Severn Beach were restored.

Preceding station	Historical railways	Following station
Stapleton Road	Bristol and South Wales Union Railway (1863-1868)	Bristol Temple Meads
Stapleton Road	Great Western Railway; Bristol and South Wales Union Railway (1868-1948); Clifton Extension Railway (1874-1948)	Bristol Temple Meads
Stapleton Road	Western Region of British Railways; Cross Country Route; Severn Beach Line (1948-1982)	Bristol Temple Meads
Stapleton Road	Regional Railways; Cross Country Route; Severn Beach Line (1982-1997)	Bristol Temple Meads
Stapleton Road	Wales & West; Cross Country Route; Severn Beach Line (1997–2001)	Bristol Temple Meads
Stapleton Road	Wessex Trains; Cross Country Route; Severn Beach Line (2001–2006)	Bristol Temple Meads

== Future ==
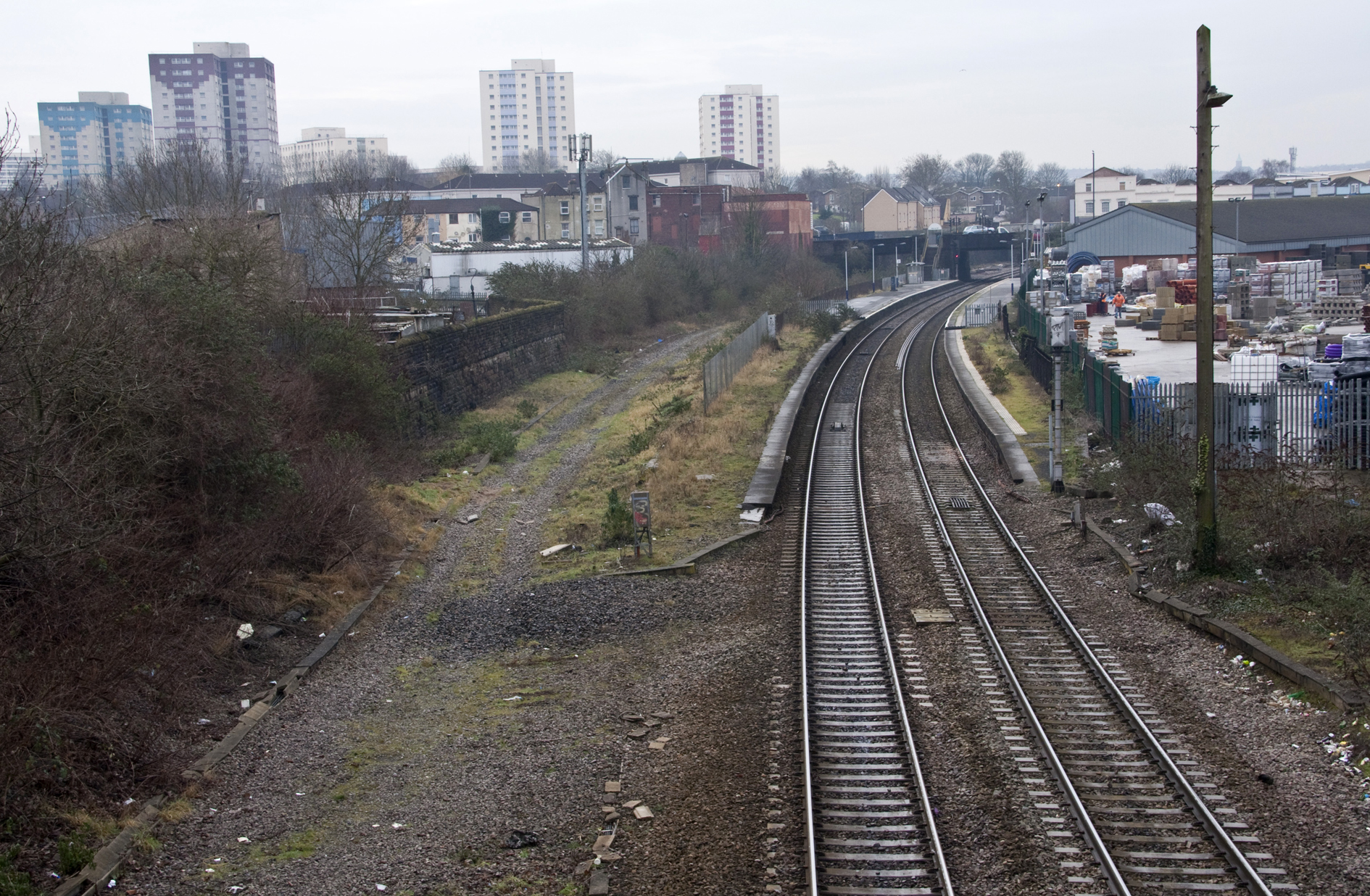
Looking at Lawrence Hill from the north in 2012. The disused trackbed on the eastern side of the station is seen on the left.

The line through Lawrence Hill was due to have been electrified by 2017 as part of the Great Western Main Line electrification project, however this was postponed indefinitely. The Severn Beach Line was not set to be electrified, so services at Lawrence Hill would still have been provided by diesel trains; however "Sprinter" units are expected to be replaced by Class 165 and 166 "Turbo" units. The group Friends of Suburban Bristol Railways supports the electrification continuing beyond the main lines, as did MP for Weston-super-Mare John Penrose. The electrification scheme also includes the four-tracking of Filton Bank, including the reinstatement of the disused trackbed at Lawrence Hill, to allow more services between Parkway and Bristol Temple Meads and separate fast inter-city services from local stopping services. Enhancement works to allow disabled access to both platforms would be carried out at the same time.

Lawrence Hill is on the Weston-super-Mare/Yate corridor, one of the main axes of the Greater Bristol Metro, a rail transport plan which aims to enhance transport capacity in the Bristol area, including half-hourly services along the Severn Beach Line. The scheme could see the reopening of the Henbury Loop Line to passengers, with the possibility of services from Bristol Temple Meads to Bristol Parkway via Clifton Down and Henbury. Plans for a loop were rejected by the West of England Joint Transport Board, however Bristol City Councillors voted to send the decision back to the board for further discussion.

The station's lack of step-free access to the southbound platform came under criticism from the then Bristol West MP Thangam Debbonaire, who noted that due to the time taken to get a train to Stapleton Road and then back to Temple Meads, what should be a five-minute journey could take an hour. Debbonaire stated that step-free access had been promised for some time. In 2025, funding was approved for the installation of a lift to enable step-free access to platform 2 as part of the West of England Combined Authority's rail investment programme. Work on the upgrade is scheduled to begin in 2027. The project was publicly welcomed by the Bristol Disability Equality Forum, who noted that it would improve the station for all people with accessibility needs.

== Incidents ==
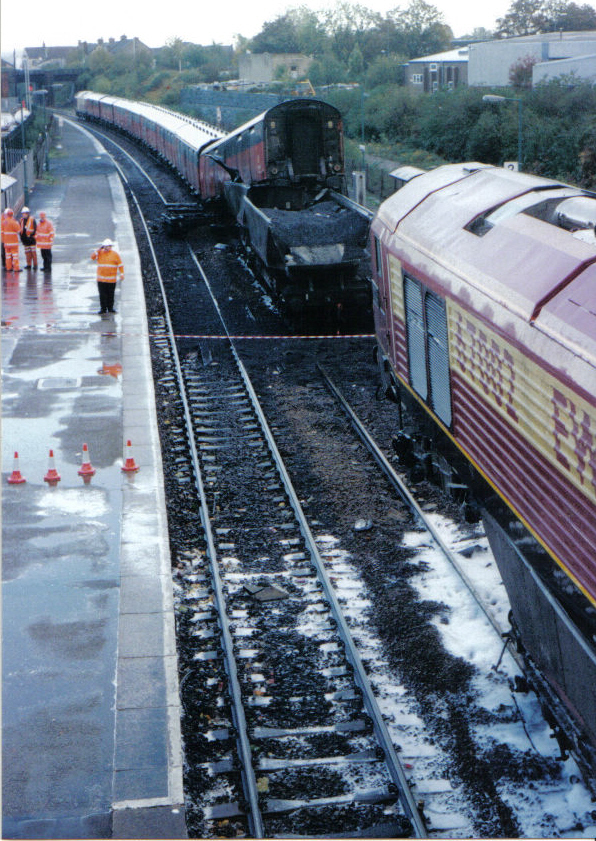
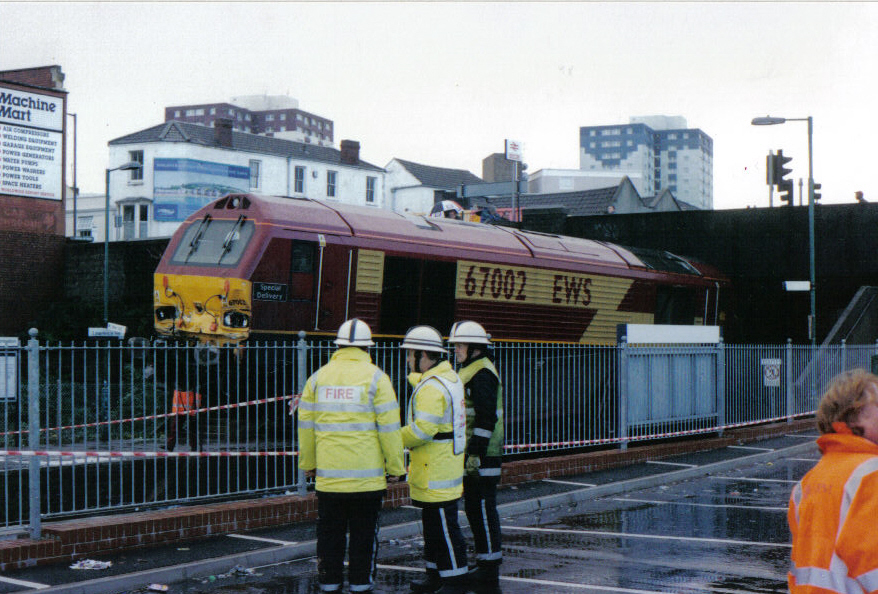
A serious crash occurred at Lawrence Hill in 2000, when a mail train passed 2 red signals and hit the back of a coal train.

A collision occurred near Lawrence Hill on 8 January 1930, approximately 500 yards (460 m) north of the station. At 5:41am, an express train from Shrewsbury to Penzance ran into the back of a minerals train which had stopped to pick up the brakes after descending Filton Bank. The express locomotive, GWR 4000 Class number 4063 "Bath Abbey", was derailed and badly damaged, with several coaches also being damaged. The incident was blamed on signalman A. H. Toop of the Lawrence Hill signal box, with contributing factors including lax working standards and the driver of the goods train, W. G. Atkins, failing to pull up to the signal box as required.

A similar crash occurred at Lawrence Hill on 1 November 2000, when a Royal Mail train passed two red signals and ran into the back of a coal train at around 3:30am. The mail train, hauled by English Welsh & Scottish Class 67 diesel locomotive number 67002 "Special Delivery", with 67012 at the rear, was travelling at 50 mph (80 km/h) when the incident occurred. The locomotive climbed over the back of the coal train, coming to rest 40 yards (37 m) later on top of a coal wagon and against the A420 Church Road bridge. The driver of the mail train suffered a broken arm and cuts to the face and chest, but there were no other injuries. The incident was initially suspected to be caused by faulty brakes, but was later found to be caused by misunderstanding and incorrect use of the locomotive's Brake Pipe Pressure Control Unit Isolating Cock by railway staff.

Lawrence Hill is considered a blackspot for railway trespass and vandalism.

== See also ==
- Public transport in Bristol
