= Supertramp (disambiguation) =

Supertramp were a British progressive rock band.

Supertramp may also refer to:

- A term first coined by the Welsh writer W. H. Davies in his 1908 autobiography The Autobiography of a Super-Tramp
- Supertramp (album) by the aforementioned band
- Alexander Supertramp, alias of Christopher McCandless, American hiker portrayed in the book and film "Into the Wild"
- Devinsupertramp, alias of Devin Graham, maker of adventure and extreme sport videos
- Supertramp (ecology), various species that easily and continually migrate
