= Bristol Supertram =

Cancelled transit system in Bristol, England

- Artist impression of Bristol Supertram in Redcliffe, Bristol

Overview
- Locale: Bristol and South Gloucestershire
- Transit type: Light rail
- Number of lines: 1
- Number of stations: 16

Operation
- Began operation: Cancelled in 2004

Technical
- System length: 10.4 mi (16.7 km)
- Track gauge: Standard gauge

Bristol Supertram was a proposed light rail system for the Bristol and South Gloucestershire regions of England. In 2001, the project was given backing from the government to build a line that would link the city centre with the North Bristol region, but the project was cancelled in 2004.

== History ==
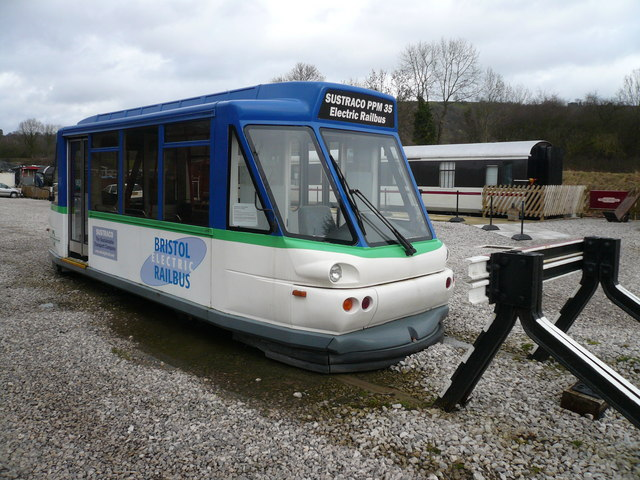
Bristol Electric Railbus PPM.35 that was operated on Bristol Harbour from 1998 to 2000

The Bristol Supertram project was launched in March 2001 with an announcement from the Deputy Prime Minister and Secretary of State for the Environment, Transport and the Regions, John Prescott. The initial cost of £194 million was to be provided by a public–private partnership which would include 20% funding from the private sector. The remaining funds were to come from the government and the local authorities of Bristol and South Gloucestershire. Bristol was one of 25 cities and conurbations that had been selected for light rail development by the New Labour government. The plans were put forward in a government white paper and a 10-year plan to improve public transport in the UK.

Opinion polls in Bristol have consistently shown that the issues of inadequate public transport and traffic congestion are two of the biggest local concerns. Public interest in a light rail system had been raised with a demonstration service by Bristol Electric Railbus Ltd (BER). This service operated a Parry People Movers railcar along the first half-mile of the Bristol Harbour Railway, where it carried more than 50,000 passengers between 1998 and 2000.

== Routes ==
The first stage of the project was to be the construction of a route called Line One, which was planned to run from Bristol City Centre to Almondsbury. The 10-mile journey would be completed in 30 minutes and make 16 stops.

The line would start from a central terminus in Union Street, which is close to Bristol bus station. It would then run along recessed rails to stops in Quay Street, Prince Street (next to Bristol Harbour) and St Mary Redcliffe. After this it would connect with the National Rail network at Bristol Temple Meads railway station.

From Temple Meads, Line One would head northwards on the Cross Country Route. Two stops would be made at reopened stations on this line that had been closed as a result of the Beeching cuts in 1964: Ashley Hill station would be refurbished and reopened as Ashley Down, and Horfield station would be renamed as Bonnington Walk to serve the Lockleaze area.

The line would now enter South Gloucestershire and stop at Filton Abbey Wood followed by Bristol Parkway. An extension was proposed with stops at the MoD Abbey Wood headquarters and the University of the West of England.

From Parkway station, the line would depart from the rail network and follow a purpose-built track. The next stop at Parkway North would serve as a park and ride from the M4 motorway. The line would then make three stops across the Bradley Stoke residential area. The northern terminus for Line One was planned to be Aztec West, a business park close to the Almondsbury Interchange. This would operate as a park and ride from the M5 motorway.

The line was intended to provide an affordable and efficient transport service that would improve the economic competitiveness of the North Bristol and South Gloucestershire corridor. It was predicted that the service would become operational in 2007.

Four additional routes were proposed for future light rail development that would use existing National Rail network lines in the region:

- A line through the South Bristol region
- A line from Bristol to Yate via Emersons Green
- A link with the Portishead Railway
- A link with the Severn Beach railway

== Project implementation ==
With a commitment from the government to provide substantial funding for the project, the unitary authorities of Bristol and South Gloucestershire needed to finalise the route for Line One. It was at this stage of the project that South Gloucestershire council put forward a plan for an extension to Line One that would terminate at The Mall shopping centre at Cribbs Causeway. Bristol council remained in favour of the original route to Aztec West. An independent evaluation was commissioned by both councils to decide between the two schemes, which was carried out by the engineering consultants WS Atkins in 2002.

The results from the Atkins report demonstrated that the Bristol Council proposal was feasible and cost effective. By contrast, the Cribbs Causeway extension was shown to affect the proposal in three ways:

- The project cost would increase by £100 million
- The construction time would increase by two years
- Line One would no longer meet the criteria for government funding

With the rejection of the Cribbs Causeway proposal, South Gloucestershire council decided to withdraw from the Supertram project.

== Cancellation ==
With the departure of South Gloucestershire, Bristol City Council submitted a modified route plan in late 2003 for a new Line One that would terminate at Parkway station. A government feasibility study was initiated to determine whether the new project still qualified for the original level of funding. It was during this period that the council found itself under political pressure to reduce a proposed local council tax increase.

With financial pressure from the council and growing uncertainty about Line One, the Labour and Conservative groups recommended that the project should be abandoned. In March 2004, Bristol council announced that the Supertram project would be cancelled. This allowed funds that had been set aside for the project to be used to cover the council tax increase. In 2005, an article in the Bristol Evening Post revealed that Bristol City Council had spent £1.5 million on Supertram between 1998 and 2004.

== Future plans ==
Since the 2004 cancellation, a number of local proposals have been made to revive the project and to look at alternative transport schemes for the region.

=== Integrated Transport Authority ===
It has been suggested since at least 2009 that the four unitary authorities of Bristol, South Gloucestershire, North Somerset and Bath and North East Somerset should form a regional Integrated Transport Authority (ITA). This could benefit the area by offering an improved level of decision-making power with regard to local transport needs. It could also potentially avoid the kind of regional disagreements that ultimately ended the Supertram project. Attempts have been made within the Bristol region to call for the establishment of an ITA. As of 2009, these plans have been rejected by the three other unitary authorities of North Somerset, Bath and North East Somerset and South Gloucestershire.

The West of England Combined Authority, established in 2017 and covering the wider Bristol area except for North Somerset, has a devolved local transport budget and publishes a joint transport plan.

=== Tram tax ===
One idea that would enable a local council to raise the finances necessary for a light rail system is the introduction of a "tram tax". It was suggested in 2005 that Bristol residents would agree to a local tax increase if they fully understood what it would deliver as a result. Tram taxes have been proposed unsuccessfully in a number of regions within the UK for the development of new light rail systems and to provide support for existing ones.

Plans to build a diesel-powered BRT alongside the Bristol & Bath cycleway were dropped following a local petition

=== Bus Rapid Transit ===
With Bristol Council unable to continue with the development of a light rail scheme, they changed their focus to a bus rapid transit (BRT) or "guided bus" system as a way of addressing the same congestion problems within the region.

In 2007, an initial BRT route was proposed that would run alongside the Bristol and Bath cycleway, causing a narrowing of the path and a loss of natural habitat in the process. This led to a campaign against the plan by local cycling and environmental pressure groups which attracted considerable support from the Bristol public, and the scheme was soon frozen after a 9,500-strong petition was received. The sustainable transport charity Sustrans said the plan was the "right idea, wrong route".

A separate scheme, Metrobus, was begun in 2006 and came into service on three limited-stop routes in 2018 and 2019. The routes mainly use bus lanes on existing roads, supplemented by construction of new roads and small sections of guided busway.

=== Other light rail plans ===
In November 2016, the West of England Local Enterprise Partnership began a consultation process on their Transport Vision Summary Document, outlining potential light rail/tram routes from the city centre to Bristol Airport, the eastern and north west fringes of the city, and a route along the A4 road to Bath. As of 2017, a four-line light metro network with underground sections is under study.

== See also ==
- Light Rail Transit Association
- MetroWest (Bristol) – plans for heavy rail in the area
