= Horfield railway station =

Former railway station in England

Coordinates: 51°29′40″N 2°34′09″W

Horfield
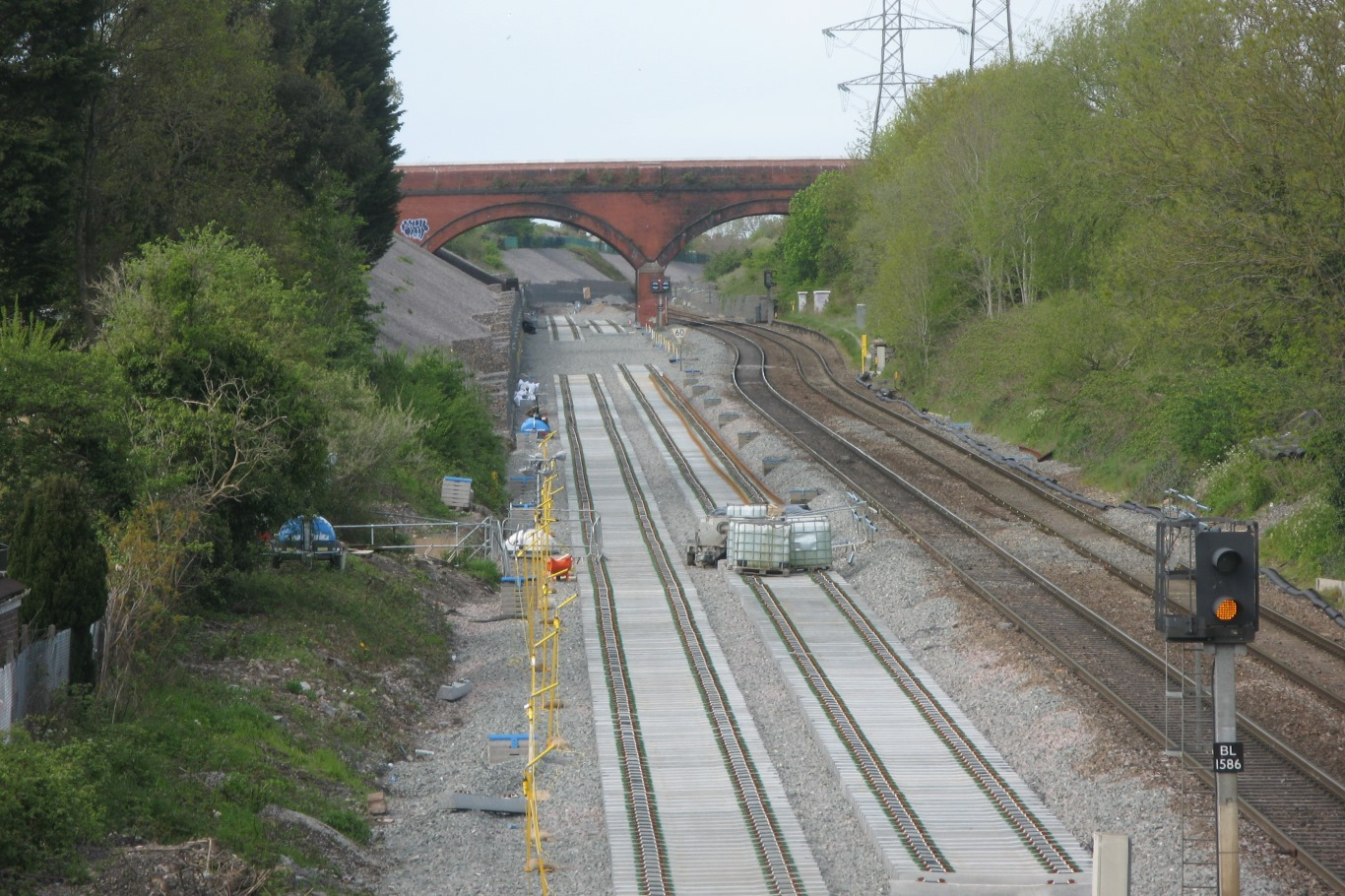
- The site in 2018

General information
- Location: Bristol, City of Bristol; England
- Platforms: 4

Other information
- Status: Disused

History
- Original company: Great Western Railway
- Post-grouping: Great Western Railway

Key dates
- 14 May 1927: Station opens
- 23 November 1964: Station closes
Location

Horfield railway station was a railway station serving the northern part of Horfield and Lockleaze in the north of Bristol, England. It was located on the main line from Bristol to South Wales. It was served by stopping trains to Severn Beach (via Pilning), Avonmouth (via Chittening) and Swindon (via Badminton).

== History ==
The station was opened in 1927 by the Great Western Railway. The station passed to the Western Region of British Railways on nationalisation in 1948. It was closed by the British Railways Board in 1964.

Preceding station	Historical railways	Following station
Ashley Hill; Line open, station closed	Great Western Railway	Filton Junction; Line open, station closed

== Location ==
Horfield railway station was located immediately to the south of the road that is now named Bonnington Walk.

== Current site ==
Trains running between Bristol Temple Meads, Filton Abbeywood and Bristol Parkway pass the site.

Local campaigners have called for the station to be reopened. In 2001 the station was selected as a stop for the proposed Bristol Supertram project, for which it would have been renamed "Bonnington Walk". This service would have operated between Broadmead Shopping Centre and Almondsbury, but the project was cancelled in 2004.

On 6 September 2013 Bristol Mayor George Ferguson said "Network Rail has advised that, in delivering four track, it would consider one additional station between Temple Meads and Filton Abbey Wood, subject to a convincing business case. Both my assistant Mark Bradshaw (Labour) and I support Ashley Hill over Horfield". This has been challenged by local rail campaigners, who believe both sites can be delivered.
