= Filton Abbey Wood railway station =

Railway station in Gloucestershire, England

Filton Abbey Wood
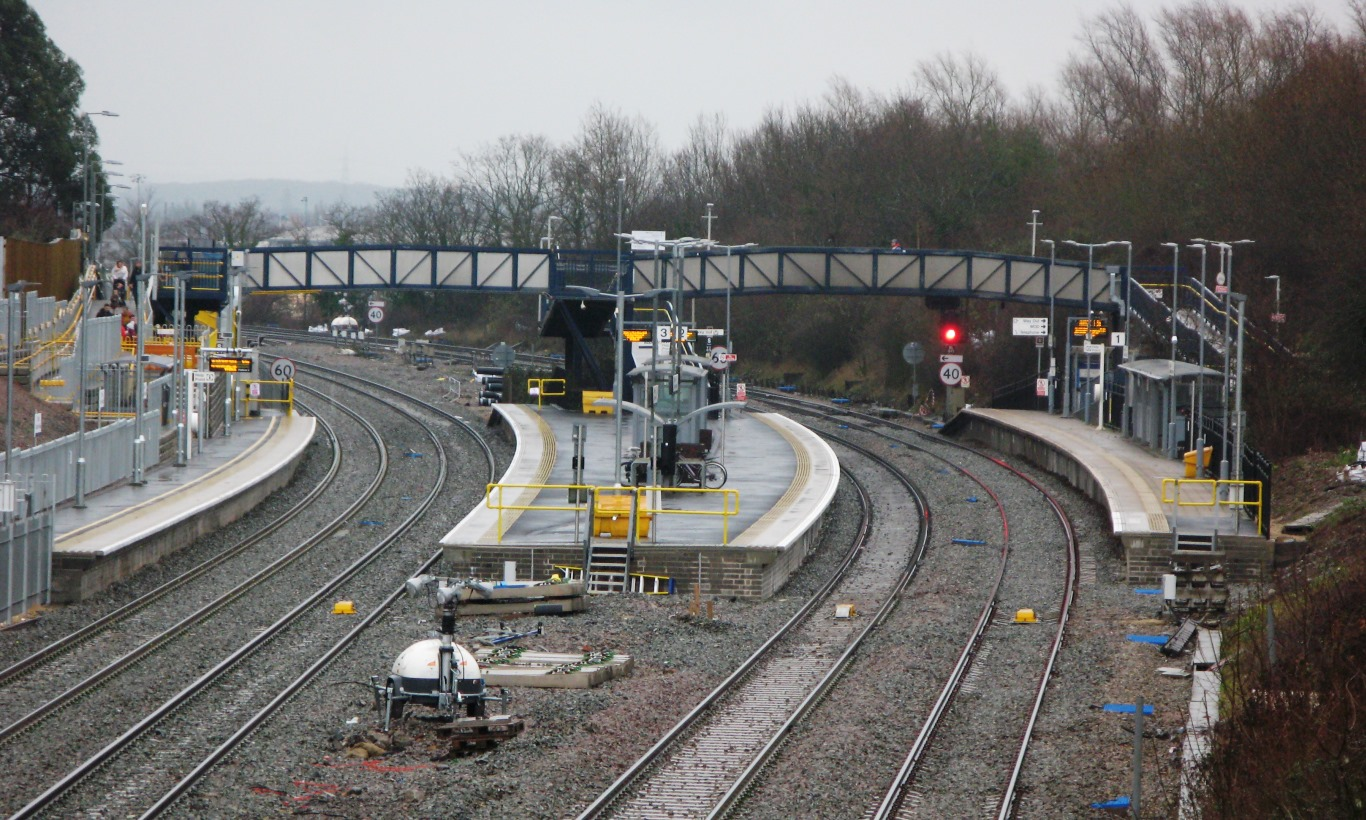
- View from the south

General information
- Location: Filton, South Gloucestershire; England
- Coordinates: 51.5034°N 2.5638°W
- Grid reference: ST609784
- Manager: Great Western Railway
- Platforms: 4

Other information
- Station code: FIT
- Classification: DfT category F1

History
- Original company: Bristol and South Wales Union Railway
- Pre-grouping: Great Western Railway
- Post-grouping: Great Western Railway

Key dates
- 1863: Opened as Filton
- 1903 (Note: There is some ambiguity about exactly when the first Filton railway station closed and the second opened. Butt's 1995 book states 1886, but Oakley and Maggs both state 1903. 1903 would tie in with the new station being built as a junction for the GWR's Badminton Line, whereas 1886 would mean an entirely new station was built only months after the original station had a second platform built.): Resited
- 1910: Renamed Filton Junction
- 1968: Renamed Filton
- 1996: Resited and renamed Filton Abbey Wood

Passengers
- 2020/21: ▼0.116 million
- 2021/22: ▲0.385 million
- 2022/23: ▲0.521 million
- 2023/24: ▲0.630 million
- 2024/25: ▲0.694 million
Location
Notes
- Passenger statistics from the Office of Rail and Road

Filton Abbey Wood railway station serves the town of Filton in South Gloucestershire, England; it is located 4.4 miles (7.1 km) from Bristol Temple Meads. There are four platforms but minimal facilities. The station is managed by Great Western Railway, which also operates all calling services. The general service level is nine trains per hour: two to Cardiff Central, two towards Gloucester, one towards Taunton, two towards Westbury and two to Bristol Temple Meads.

Filton Abbey Wood is the third station on the site. The first station, Filton, was opened in 1863 by the Bristol and South Wales Union Railway. The station had a single platform, with a second added in 1886 to cope with traffic from the Severn Tunnel. The station was closed in 1903, replaced by a new station, Filton Junction, 0.15 miles (0.24 km) further north, which was built at the junction with the newly constructed Badminton Line from Wootton Bassett Junction. The new station had four platforms, each with waiting rooms and large canopies.

Services at Filton Junction declined in the second half of the twentieth century, with the station buildings and Badminton Line platforms demolished in 1976. The station was closed completely in September 1996, replaced by the current station, Filton Abbey Wood. This was built 0.3 miles (0.48 km) south of the original station, adjacent to the new Ministry of Defence office development of MoD Abbey Wood, which was opened in 1996. The station was built with two platforms, but a third was added in 2004 and a fourth in 2018.

The line through Filton Abbey Wood is not electrified. Platform 4 was completed in 2018 as part of the Filton Bank four-tracking project, allowing increased services between Bristol Parkway and Bristol Temple Meads.

== History ==
There have been three different stations in the area of Filton Abbey Wood. The first, Filton, opened in 1863 just north the site of the current Filton Abbey Wood, and was closed in 1903. A second station was opened a few hundred yards to the north, and was known as Filton Junction. This station closed in 1996, replaced by Filton Abbey Wood.

=== First station: Filton ===
The first station at Filton opened on 8 September 1863 when services began on the Bristol and South Wales Union Railway (BSWUR), which ran from Bristol Temple Meads to New Passage Pier, north of Bristol on the banks of the River Severn. At New Passage, passengers were transferred to a ferry to cross the Severn to continue on into Wales. The line, engineered by Isambard Kingdom Brunel, was built as single track 7 ft 1/4 in (2,140 mm) broad gauge, with a platform on the western side of the line. The station was situated in the county of Gloucestershire, 4 miles 53 chains (7.5 km) from Bristol Temple Meads and immediately south of the modern bridge over the A4174 Avon Ring Road. (Note: Railways in the United Kingdom are, for historical reasons, measured in miles and chains. There are 80 chains to the mile.) The BSWUR was amalgamated with the Great Western Railway, who had from the beginning operated all BSWUR services, in 1868; and in 1873 the line was converted to 1,435 mm (4 ft 8 1/2 in) standard gauge. Although the line made travel from Bristol to Wales easier, the change from train to ferry to train was inconvenient, and so a tunnel was built under the River Severn. To cope with the anticipated increase in demand, the line through Filton was doubled, with a new platform built on the eastern side of the new track, complete with waiting room. The new track was first used on 1 September 1886 when the Severn Tunnel opened. The station continued in use until 1 July 1903, when it was closed and replaced by a new station 11 chains (0.22 km) further north. There is no trace remaining of the original station.

Preceding station	Historical railways	Following station
Patchway	Bristol and South Wales Union Railway (1863–1864)	Stapleton Road
Patchway	Bristol and South Wales Union Railway (1864–1868)	Ashley Hill; Line open, station closed.
Patchway	Great Western Railway; Bristol and South Wales Union Line (1868–1903)	Ashley Hill; Line open, station closed.

=== Second station: Filton Junction ===
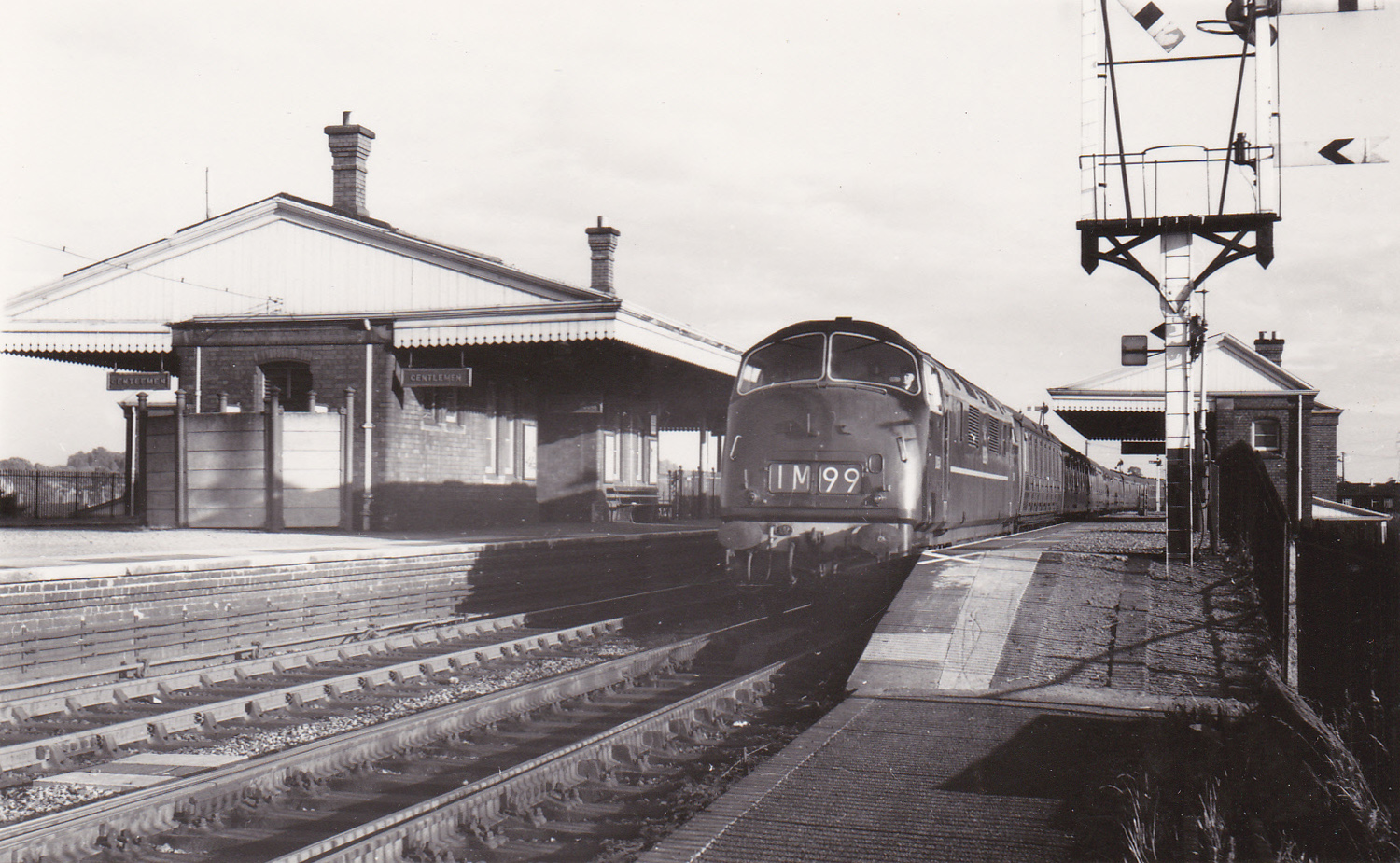
A train for Wales passes through Filton Junction in 1962.

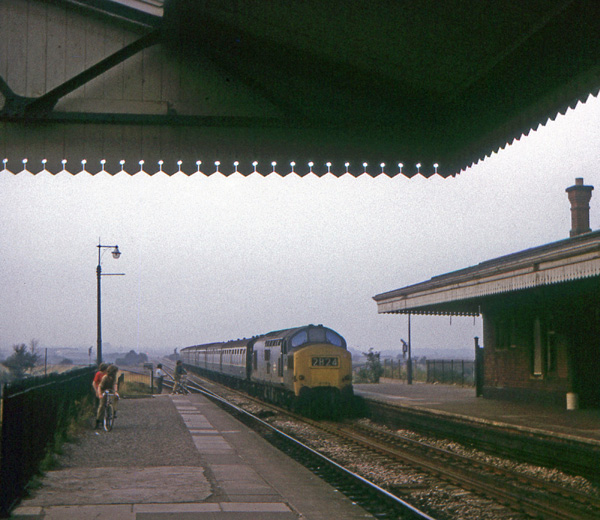
A train passes through Filton in 1972, working a Wales-Bristol service. The line off to the left is the Henbury Loop Line.

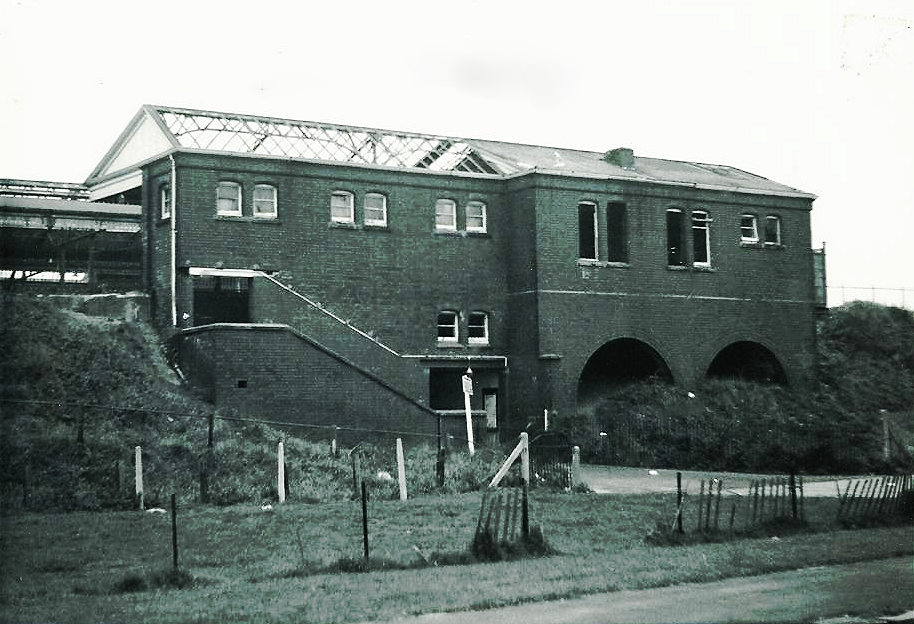
The large station building on the west side in 1977.

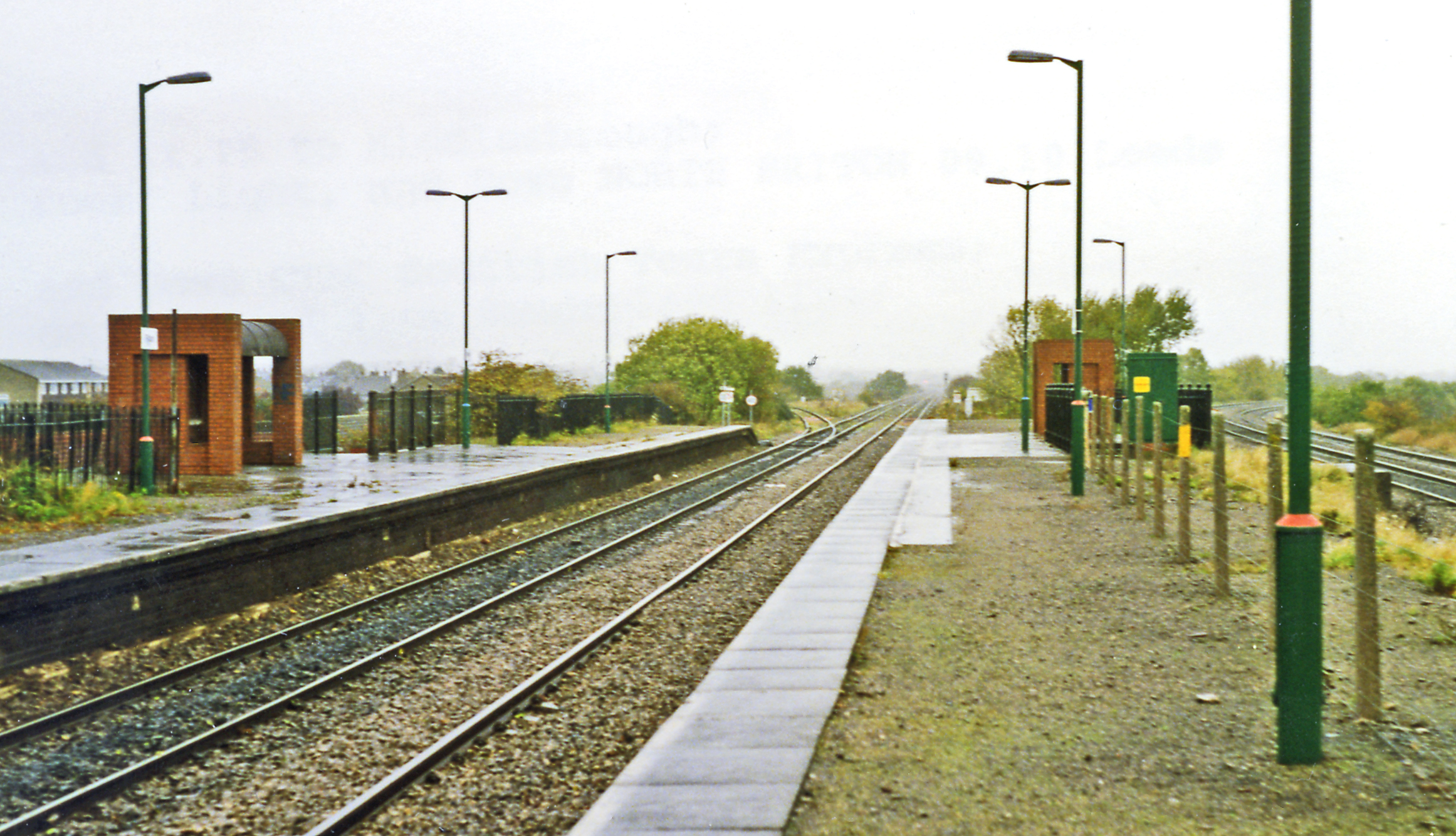
Filton Junction railway station in 1992, after the demolition of the buildings.

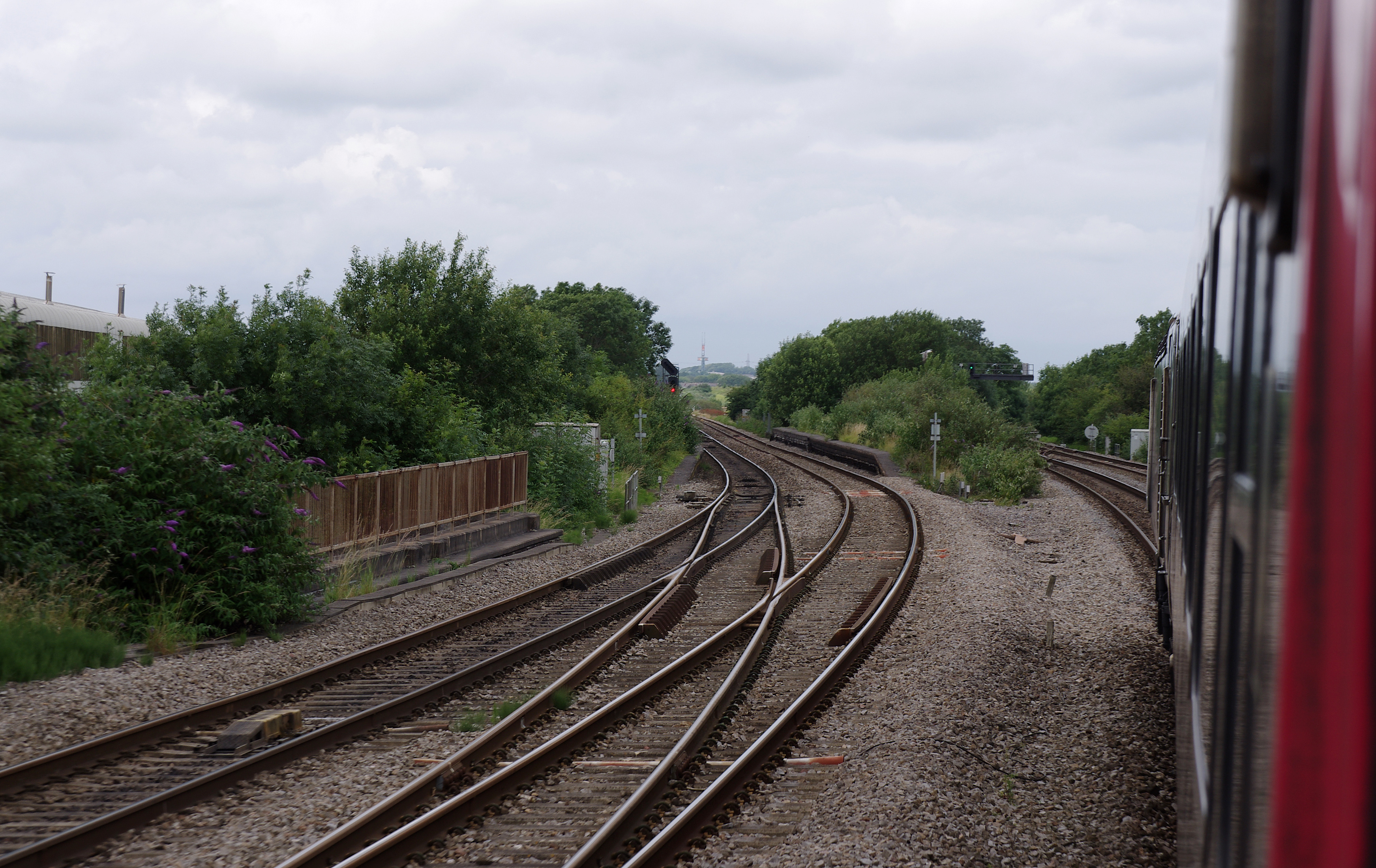
The station as it stands today, seen from a passing train.

In 1900, almost all trains from London to Wales travelled via Bath and Bristol, with some still routed via Gloucester. However, the final 15 miles (24 km) to Bristol were relatively slow and congested, so a new route was built further north, the GWR's Badminton Line, now part of the South Wales Main Line, running from Wootton Bassett Junction to Patchway. The new line opened in 1903, and allowed faster services to Wales. There was a new triangular junction between Patchway and Filton, with the new line coming in from the east. The new station, opened on 1 July 1903, was on an embankment at the southern apex of the junction, just north of the present A4174. It was 11 chains (0.22 km) north of the first station, 4 miles 64 chains (7.7 km) from Bristol Temple Meads and 112 miles 67 chains (181.6 km) from London Paddington via the new line.

The new station had four platform faces - two outer platforms, and two inner platforms sharing an island between the southbound line from Patchway and the westbound line to London. The western platforms served trains between Bristol and Wales, while the eastern platforms served trains on the new line. The platforms were linked by a subway which led to the booking office, situated on ground level by the main entrance on the east side of the station. The approach road led south from the main entrance, towards the A4174. There were waiting rooms and large canopies on each of the platforms. There were goods facilities to the south of the road, on the west side of the line and covering the site of the first station. There was a goods shed with a loading platform on a passing loop, as well as a north-facing covered loading platform and a south-facing siding. An additional south-facing siding for coal traffic was added after the First World War. Opposite the goods yard was Filton Junction Signal Box, which controlled the junction and by 1948 had more than 70 levers.

Following the opening of the Henbury Loop Line, which diverged from the line towards Wales 3 chains (60 m) to the north, the station was renamed Filton Junction on 1 May 1910. Trains on this line used the western platforms, and often operated loop services to and from Bristol Temple Meads via Clifton Down. From 1928, trains could also run loop services via Clifton Down, Severn Beach and Patchway. As well as being useful for passengers changing trains (due to its junction status), Filton Junction was also used by workers at the nearby Filton Aerodrome and the attendant aircraft works.

When the railways were nationalised in 1948, Filton Junction came under the aegis of the Western Region of British Railways. Following the publication of the Beeching Report, the Henbury Line was closed to passengers in 1964, and service levels began to decline. The line between Pilning and Severn Beach was also closed, putting an end to loop services. The goods yard was closed in July 1965, and the station's name reverted to Filton from 6 May 1968. Much of the station buildings were demolished in 1976, as were the platforms serving Badminton Line trains, as no trains on this line called at Filton anymore. The remaining two platforms had small replacement shelters built on them.

In 1974, when the Local Government Act 1972 came into effect, the southern part of Gloucestershire, including the district of Filton, became part of the new county of Avon. British Rail was split into business-led sectors in the 1980s, at which time operations at Filton passed to Regional Railways.

In the 1990s, plans were made to build a new station in Filton and close the 1903 station. The last train called on 8 March 1996, with services moving to the new Filton Abbey Wood from 11 March, with two intervening days of no service due to a closure of the Severn Tunnel. The remains of Filton Junction can still be seen from passing trains, and the two western platforms are still present, albeit overgrown. The subway has been blocked off, and the access road is now a residential street called "The Sidings".

Preceding station	Historical railways	Following station
Patchway	Great Western Railway; Bristol and South Wales Union Line (1903–1927)	Ashley Hill; Line open, station closed.
Patchway	Great Western Railway; Bristol and South Wales Union Line (1927–1948)	Horfield; Line open, station closed.
Patchway	Western Region of British Railways; South Wales Main Line (1948–1964)	Horfield; Line open, station closed.
Patchway	Western Region of British Railways; South Wales Main Line (1948–1964)	Stapleton Road
Patchway	Regional Railways; South Wales Main Line (1982–1996)	Stapleton Road
Winterbourne; Line open, station closed.	Great Western Railway; South Wales Main Line (1903–1927); Bristol and Gloucester Railway (1908–1927)	Ashley Hill; Line open, station closed.
Winterbourne; Line open, station closed.	Great Western Railway; South Wales Main Line; Bristol and Gloucester Railway (1927–1948)	Horfield; Line open, station closed.
Winterbourne; Line open, station closed.	Western Region of British Railways; South Wales Main Line; Cross Country Route (1948–1961)	Horfield; Line open, station closed.
Swindon	Western Region of British Railways; South Wales Main Line (1961–1964)	Horfield; Line open, station closed.
Yate	Western Region of British Railways; Cross Country Route (1961–1964)	Horfield; Line open, station closed.
Swindon	Western Region of British Railways; South Wales Main Line (1964–1972)	Stapleton Road
Yate	Western Region of British Railways; Cross Country Route (1964–1965)	Stapleton Road
Cheltenham Spa	Western Region of British Railways; Cross Country Route (1965–1972)	Stapleton Road
Bristol Parkway	Western Region of British Railways; South Wales Main Line (1972–1982)	Stapleton Road
Bristol Parkway	Regional Railways; South Wales Main Line; Cross Country Route (1982–1996)	Stapleton Road
Filton Halt; Line closed to passengers.	Great Western Railway; Henbury Loop Line (1910–1915)	Ashley Hill; Line open, station closed.
Henbury; Line closed to passengers.	Great Western Railway; Henbury Loop Line (1915–1926)	Ashley Hill; Line open, station closed.
North Filton Platform; Line closed to passengers.	Great Western Railway; Henbury Loop Line (1926–1927)	Ashley Hill; Line open, station closed.
North Filton Platform; Line closed to passengers.	Great Western Railway; Henbury Loop Line (1927–1948)	Horfield; Line open, station closed.
North Filton Platform; Line closed to passengers.	Western Region of British Railways; Henbury Loop Line (1948–1964)	Horfield; Line open, station closed.

=== Third station: Filton Abbey Wood ===
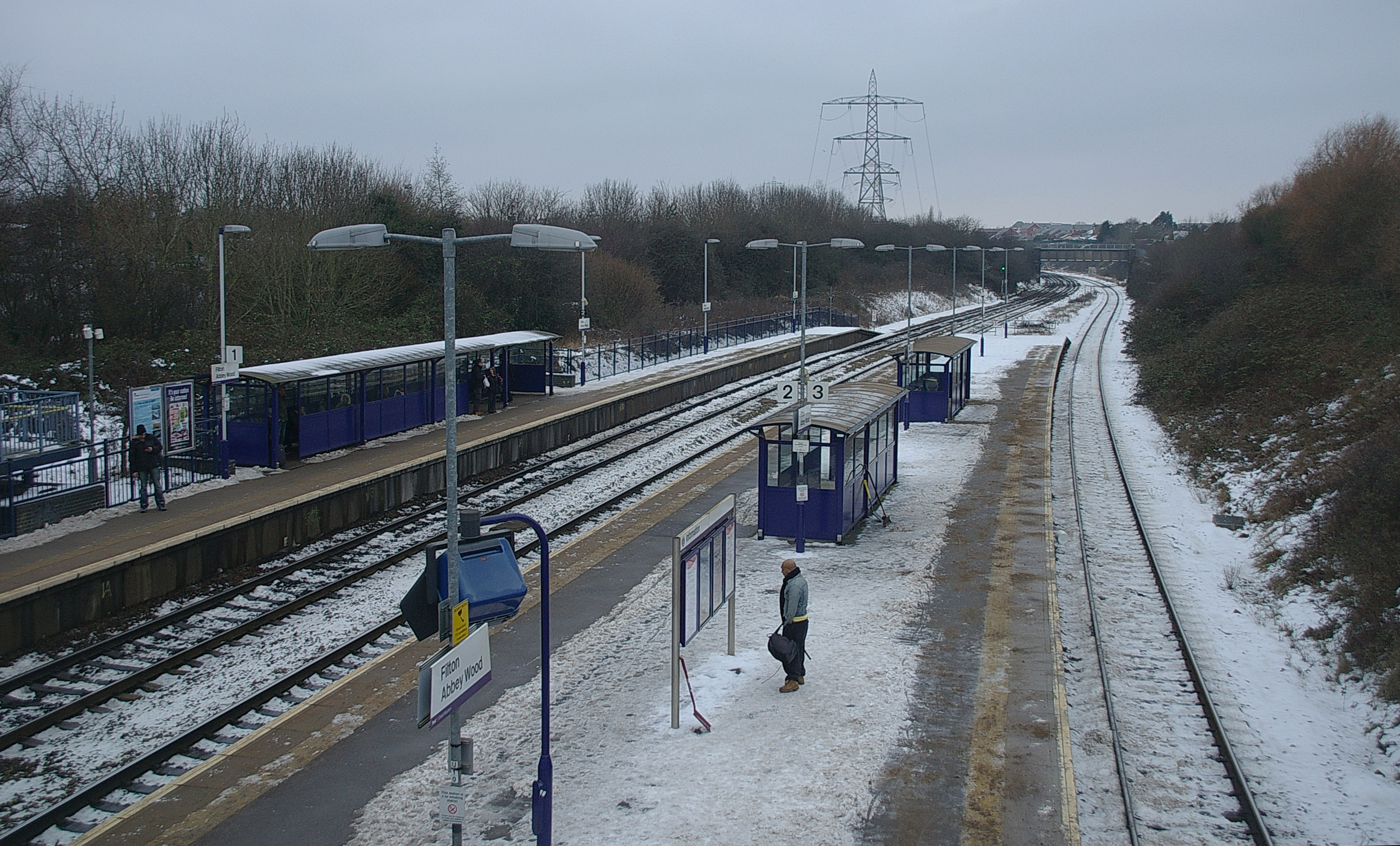
Snowy conditions in 2010, showing the three platforms, with the newest platform on the right.

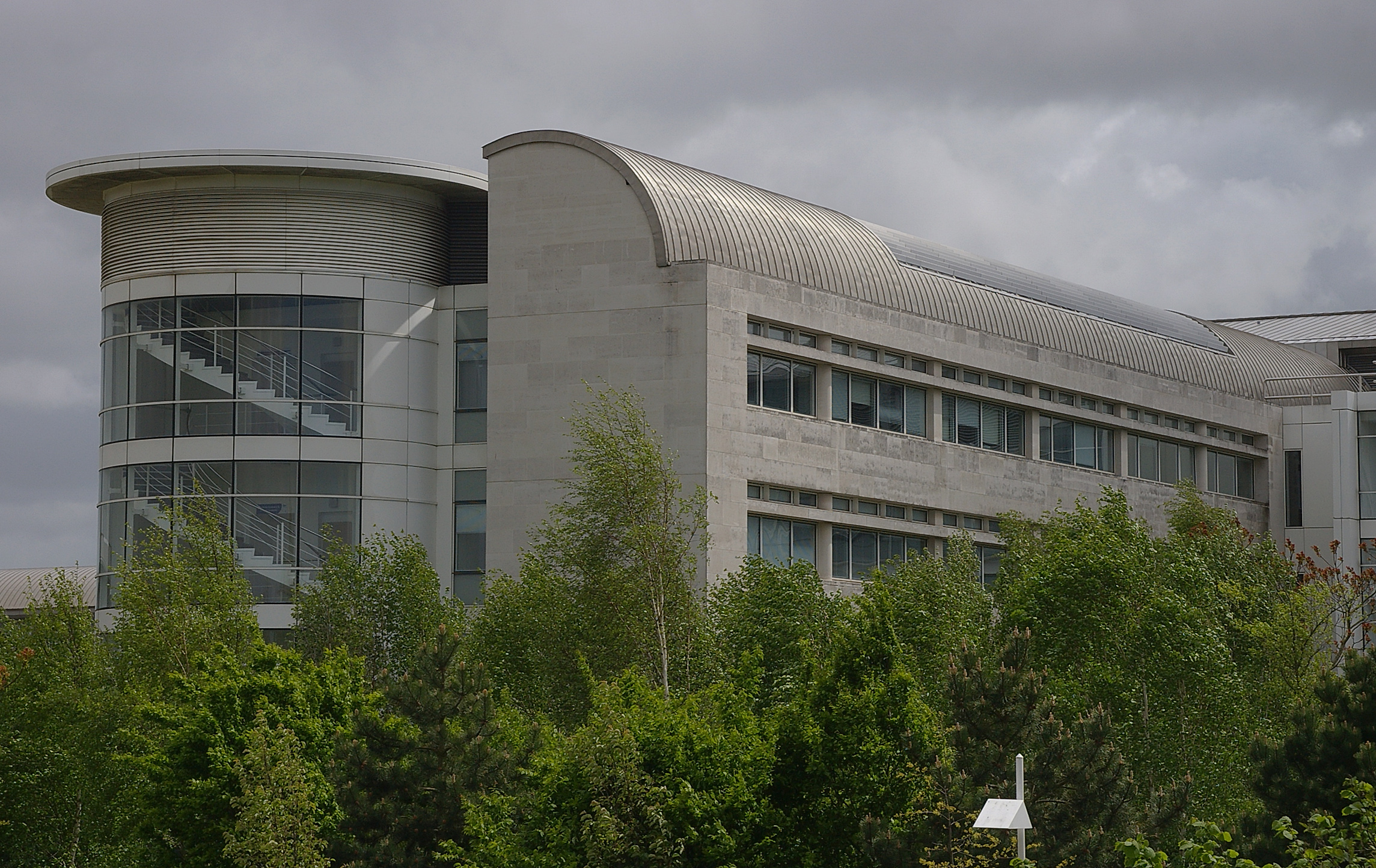
Filton Abbey Wood was constructed for ease of access of workers at MoD Abbey Wood, which is next to the station.

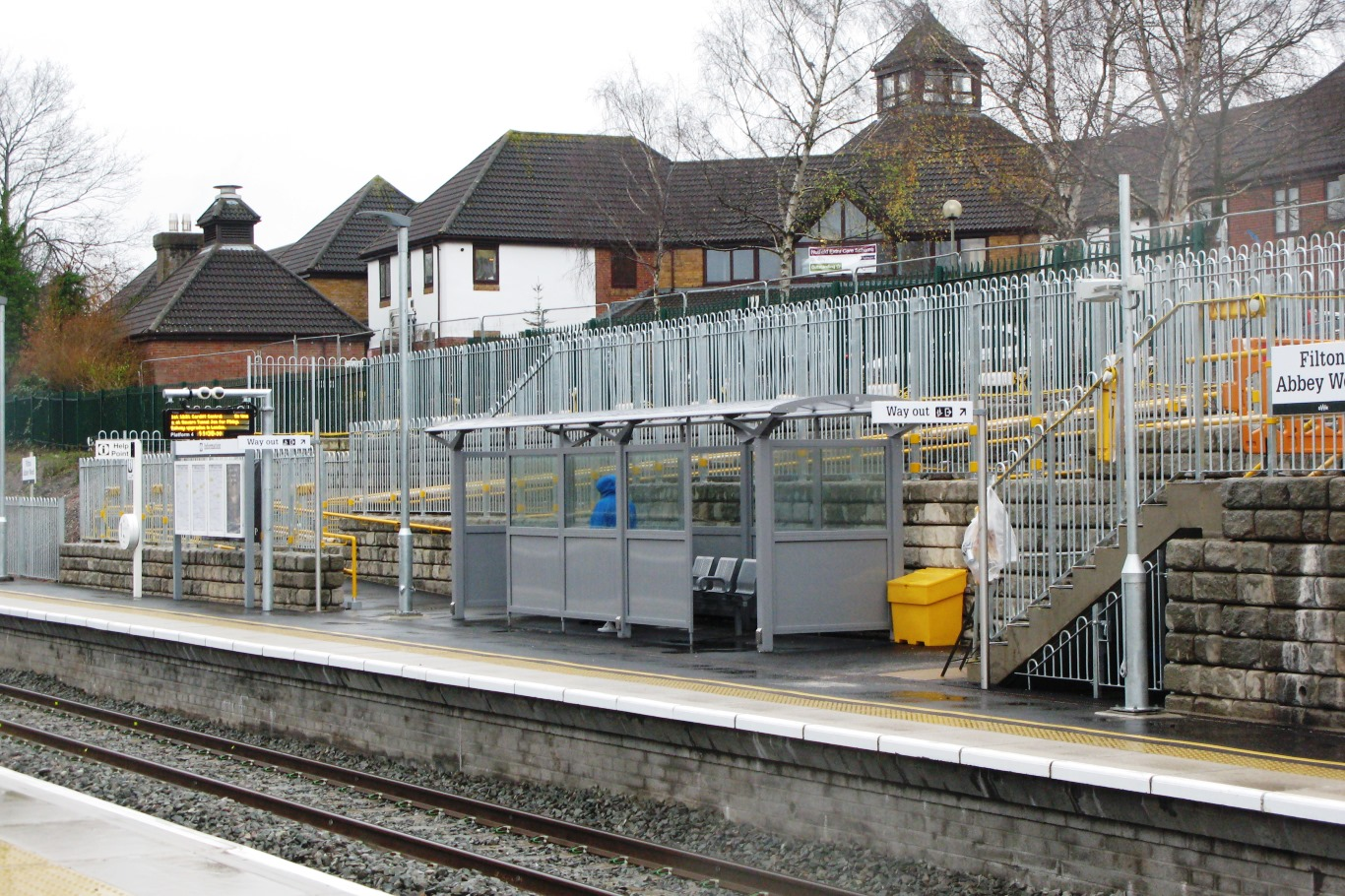
Platform 4 which was added in 2018

In the early 1990s, the Ministry of Defence procurement division was consolidated into a major office development in Filton, known as MoD Abbey Wood. As part of this development, a new station was built in Filton, primarily to serve the MoD workers. Construction began in 1995, and cost £1,400,000. The station, named Filton Abbey Wood, was opened to the public on 11 March 1996 and officially opened on 19 March by Minister for Transport Steven Norris MP and the Chair of Avon County Council. Shortly after the station was opened, the county of Avon was disbanded, with the Filton region now governed by South Gloucestershire council.

The new station was situated 23 chains (460 m) south of the first Filton station, and 34 chains (680 m) south of Filton Junction. There were two platforms, each 108 metres (118 yd) long, separated by two running lines. A ramped footbridge connected the platforms at the north end, and each platform had ground-level access from the sides: the eastern, southbound platform from MoD Abbey Wood; the western, northbound platform via a footpath from the car park to the north. There were metal and glass shelters on each platform and a small, rarely used booking office on the southbound platform.

Initial services at the station included local stopping services from Bristol to South Wales, and services between Gloucester and Westbury. Services towards Bath were of particular importance to the MoD, as many of their staff had been based there prior to the construction of MoD Abbey Wood. South Gloucestershire council provided a subsidy for half-hourly services to Bath. The station proved popular with MoD workers, local residents commuting into central Bristol, and also students and staff at the University of the West of England.

When the railway was privatised in 1997, local services were franchised to Wales & West, which was succeeded by Wessex Trains in 2001. The line through Filton closed for two weeks in June 2004 to enable the construction of a new platform and third running line on the west side of the station, separating trains towards Bristol Parkway from trains towards Wales before the station, and so allowing through-trains to pass stopping trains. The project cost £16 million, and caused the complete suspension of Severn Beach Line services to allow longer-distance services to use it as a diversion.

The Wessex franchise was amalgamated with the Great Western franchise into the Greater Western franchise from 2006, and responsibility passed to First Great Western which was subsequently rebranded as Great Western Railway in 2015. First introduced new services between Bristol Parkway and Weston-super-Mare, and between Cardiff Central and Taunton, each calling at Filton Abbey Wood. From December 2006, Virgin CrossCountry began operating a single daily service Newcastle to Cardiff Central via Bristol Temple Meads and Filton Abbey Wood. This service was taken over by Arriva CrossCountry when the CrossCountry franchise changed hands in 2007, and then replaced by a daily service each direction between Cardiff Central and Manchester Piccadilly.

A three-week closure of the line and station in late October & early/mid November 2018 saw all trains replaced by buses between Bristol Parkway and Bristol Temple Meads and on the Severn Beach branch whilst the four track layout between Dr Day's Junction and Filton Junction was reinstated, also bringing a new fourth platform at Filton Abbey Wood into use and short extensions to the southern ends of the other three platforms to fully accommodate 5 carriage 23 metre vehicle trains.

Preceding station	Historical railways	Following station
Bristol Parkway	Regional Railways; Cross Country Route (1996–1997)	Stapleton Road
Bristol Parkway	Wales & West; Cross Country Route (1997–2001)	Stapleton Road
Bristol Parkway	Wessex Trains; Cross Country Route (2001–2006)	Stapleton Road
Patchway	Regional Railways; South Wales Main Line (1996–1997)	Stapleton Road
Patchway	Wales & West; South Wales Main Line (1997–2001)	Stapleton Road
Patchway	Wessex Trains; South Wales Main Line (2001–2006)	Stapleton Road
Patchway	Virgin CrossCountry; Cardiff - Newcastle (2006–2007)	Bristol Temple Meads

== Location ==
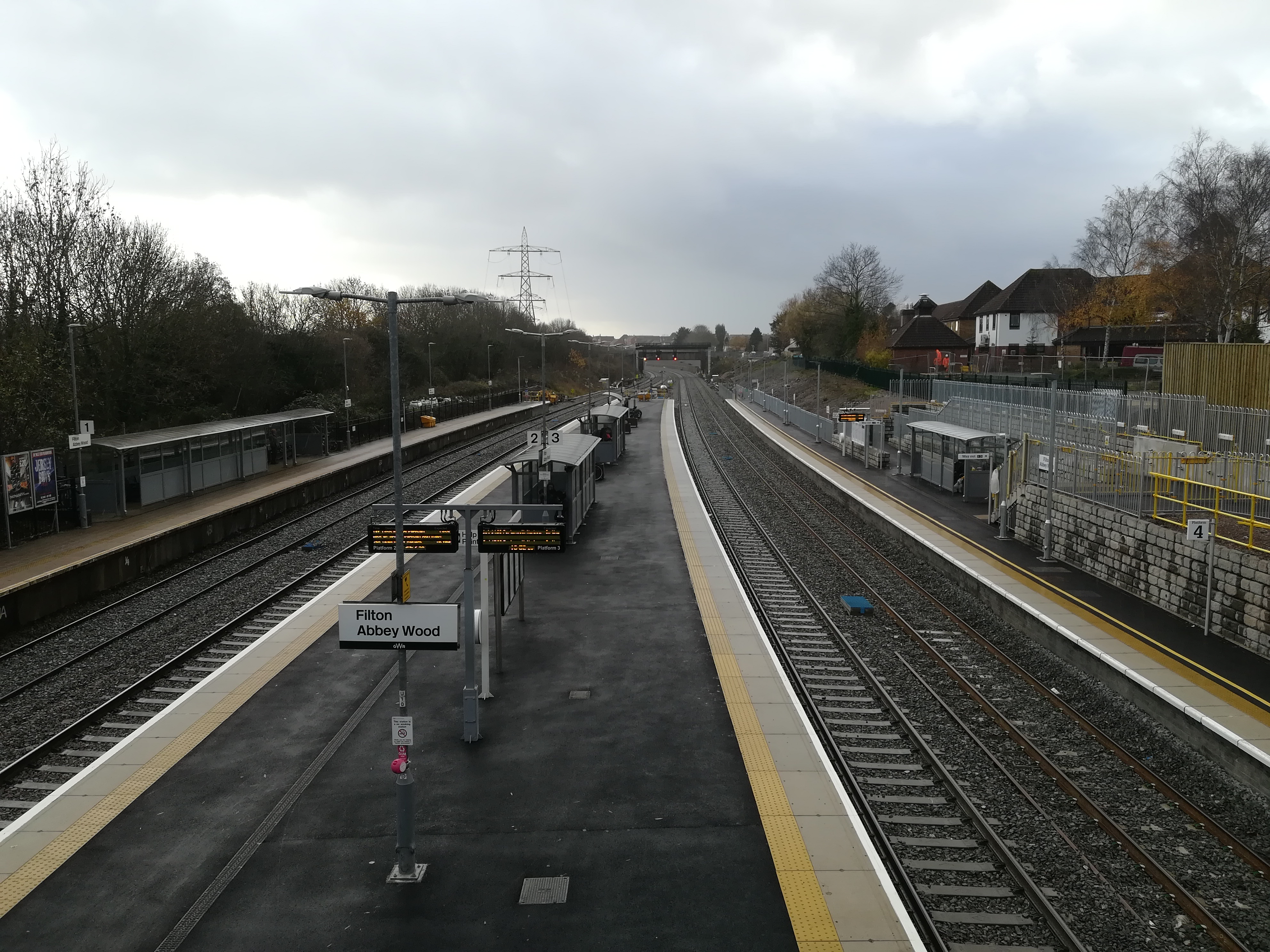
A view from the footbridge.

Filton Abbey Wood railway station is located in the Filton area of South Gloucestershire, within the Bristol conurbation. The area to the west of the station is primarily residential, while to the east is a large commercial area, including MoD Abbey Wood which is adjacent to the station. The main access to the station is via a long footpath (a slope of approximately 1 in 8) and bridge from Emma-Chris Way to the north, which has a small car park. There is also foot access from MoD Abbey Wood to the east. The station is on the Cross Country Route between Bristol Temple Meads and Bristol Parkway, and just off the South Wales Main Line south of Patchway and the eastern end of the Henbury Loop Line. It is 4 miles 30 chains (7.0 km) from Bristol Temple Meads and 113 miles 21 chains (182.3 km) from London Paddington (via Bristol Parkway). The station is just north of Filton South Junction, where the northbound line to South Wales and the westbound line to Avonmouth split from the line to Bristol Parkway, and just south of Filton Junction No. 1, where the southbound lines from South Wales and Parkway converge. The next station south is Stapleton Road, the next station north is Patchway, and the next station east is Bristol Parkway.

== Facilities ==
Facilities at the station are minimal - there are metal and glass shelters on each platform, and some seating. A small ticket office operates on platform 1 on weekday afternoons, there is also a machine for buying tickets but the station is generally unstaffed. There are customer help points, giving next train information for all platforms, as well as dot-matrix displays showing the next trains on each platform. A small pay and display car park with 30 spaces is to the north of the station, as are racks for eight bicycles. CCTV cameras are in operation at the station.

== Passenger volume ==
Over the decade 2002–2012, passenger numbers at Filton Abbey Wood almost doubled, from 395,000 to 771,000. (Note: Annual estimated passenger usage based on sales of tickets in stated financial year(s) which end or originate at Filton Abbey Wood, from Office of Rail and Road statistics. Methodology may vary year on year.) In the 2006/07 financial year, over 50,000 passengers used Filton Abbey Wood to travel to or from Bristol Temple Meads.

== Platform layout ==
Services typically use the following platforms:

Platform 1 - Services heading towards Bristol Temple Meads from Bristol Parkway
Platform 2 - Services heading towards Bristol Parkway from Bristol Temple Meads
Platform 3 - Services heading towards Bristol Temple Meads from Cardiff Central
Platform 4 - Services heading towards Cardiff Central from Bristol Temple Meads

== Services ==
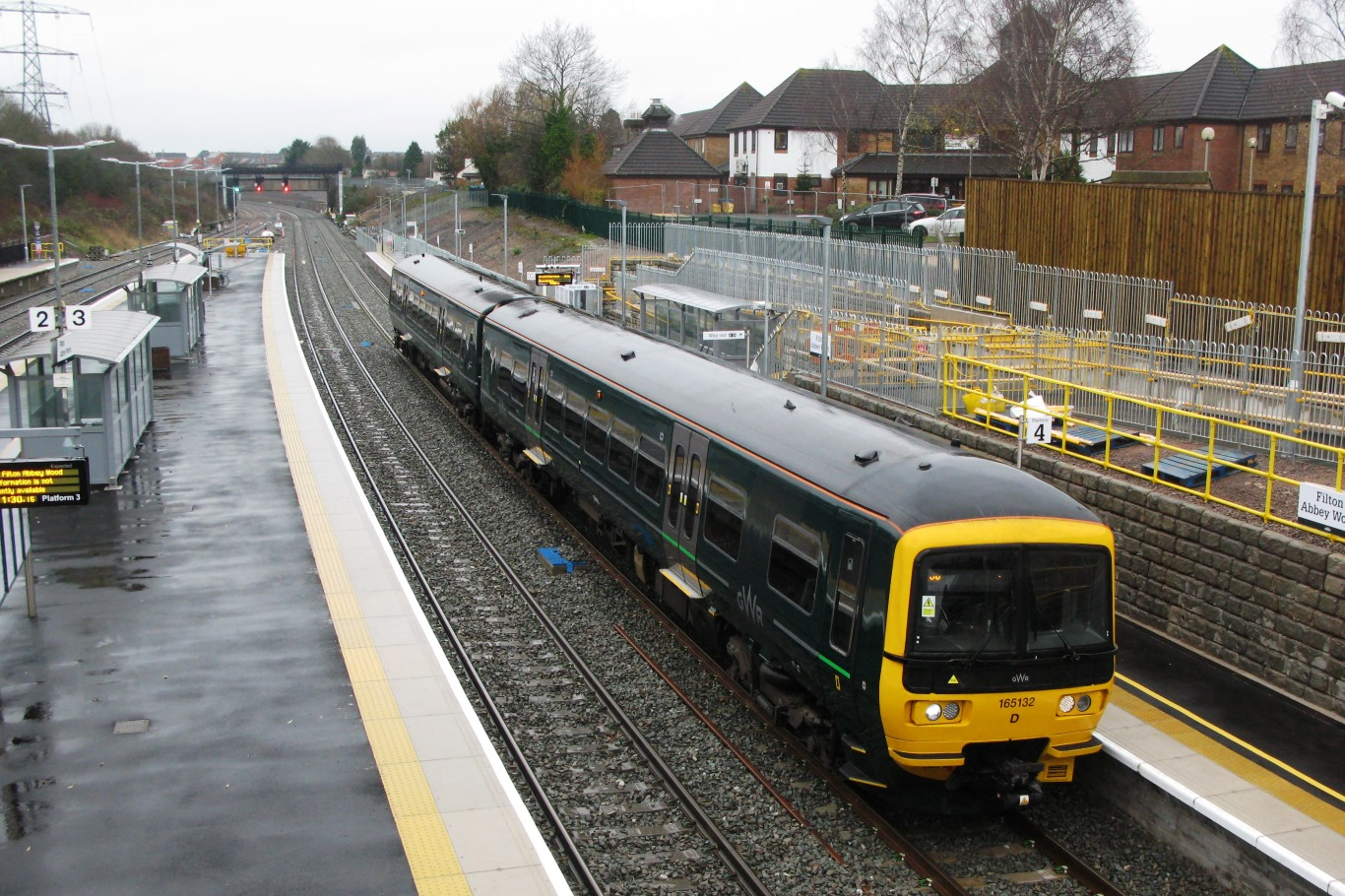
Most services at Filton Abbey Wood are provided by Great Western Railway using diesel multiple units such as this Class 165.

Filton Abbey Wood is managed by Great Western Railway which operates all services from the station. The basic service from Monday to Friday is five trains per hour in each direction, split between four services. These are the hourly services each way between Filton Abbey Wood and Bristol Temple Meads; Penzance and Cardiff Central; Portsmouth Harbour and Cardiff Central; Worcester Foregate Street and Bristol Temple Meads; and finally Gloucester and Westbury. The Penzance service occasionally terminates at other stations such as Plymouth or Taunton, while the service between Gloucester and Westbury has alternate hour extensions to Weymouth in the south, as well as two trains a day terminating at Frome and one daily extension to Portsmouth Harbour. Combined, there are two trains per hour to Bristol Parkway, two trains per hour to Cardiff Central and five trains per hour to Bristol Temple Meads. A single direct service from London Paddington calls at Filton Abbey Wood in the morning, continuing to Swansea, but there are no direct services to London. CrossCountry services pass through the station, but do not stop.

The local services described above are formed using Class 158, 165 and 166 diesel multiple units. The London to Swansea service is operated by Class 800s or Class 802s, as well as those between Cardiff Central and Taunton.

The standard journey time to Bristol Temple Meads is 8 minutes, to Bristol Parkway is 4 minutes, and to Cardiff Central is 50 minutes.

On weekdays only, a Parliamentary service also travels via Bristol West Curve, avoiding Bristol Temple Meads. It arrives at 07:33 and originates at Bath Spa.

Preceding station	National Rail	Following station
Bristol Parkway	Great Western Railway; Filton Abbey Wood - Bristol Temple Meads; Worcester Foregate Street/Gloucester - Bristol Temple Meads/Westbury/Weymouth	Ashley Down
Bristol Parkway	Great Western Railway; Filton Abbey Wood - Bristol Temple Meads; Worcester Foregate Street/Gloucester - Bristol Temple Meads/Westbury/Weymouth	Bristol Temple Meads
Patchway	Great Western Railway; Cardiff Central - Penzance	Stapleton Road (Northbound only, limited service)
Patchway	Great Western Railway; Cardiff Central - Penzance	Bristol Temple Meads
Newport	Great Western Railway; Cardiff Central - Portsmouth Harbour	Bristol Temple Meads
Newport	Great Western Railway; London to Swansea (Northbound only, limited service)	Bristol Temple Meads
Patchway	CrossCountry; Cardiff Central - Manchester Piccadilly (Limited service)	Bristol Temple Meads

== Future ==
The line through Filton Abbey Wood was due to have been electrified by 2017 as part of the Great Western Main Line electrification project, however this has been postponed indefinitely. The Cross Country Route, the Bristol to Exeter line and the Heart of Wessex Line were not set to be electrified, so services at Filton Abbey Wood would still have been provided by diesel trains; however many "Sprinter" units have been replaced by Class 165 and 166 "Turbo" units. The group Friends of Suburban Bristol Railways supports the electrification continuing beyond the main lines, as does MP for Weston-super-Mare John Penrose. The electrification scheme also included the four-tracking of the line through Filton to allow more services between Bristol Parkway and Bristol Temple Meads and to separate fast inter-city services from local stopping services, which was completed in November 2018. A fourth platform has been added in November 2018 as part of the project.

Filton Abbey Wood is on the Weston-super-Mare/Yate corridor, one of the main axes of the Greater Bristol Metro, a rail transport plan which aims to enhance transport capacity in the Bristol area. The plan will also see the reopening of the Henbury Loop Line and the opening of a new station at Ashley Hill between Filton and Stapleton Road.

== See also ==
- Rail services in Bristol
