= Rail services in the West of England =

Rail services in the West of England refer to passenger rail journeys made in the Bristol commuter area. 17 million passenger rail journeys were made in 2019-20 within the Gloucestershire, Wiltshire and Bristol/Bath region.

== Services in the West of England ==
=== CrossCountry (XC) ===
- Bristol Temple Meads - Manchester Piccadilly (Extensions to Paignton)
- Plymouth - Edinburgh Waverley (Extensions to Glasgow and Aberdeen)

=== Great Western Railway (GWR) ===
- South West/Bristol Temple Meads - London Paddington (via Bath Spa)
- Swansea/Cardiff - London Paddington (via Bristol Parkway)
- Bristol Parkway - Weston-super-Mare
- Great Malvern/Gloucester - Westbury/Weymouth
- Cardiff Central - Portsmouth Harbour
- Cardiff Central - Taunton
- Bristol Temple Meads - Avonmouth/Severn Beach

=== South Western Railway (SWR) ===
- Yeovil Junction/Frome - Salisbury/London Waterloo

== Main destinations ==
There is usually a direct weekday service from Bristol Parkway & Bristol Temple Meads to these destinations:

Destination	Time from Bristol Temple Meads	Time from Bristol Parkway	Operator(s)
Avonmouth	23 – 35 minutes	N/A	GWR
Bath Spa	11 – 19 minutes	28 – 47 minutes	GWR
Bristol Parkway	8 – 21 minutes	N/A	CrossCountry / GWR
Bristol Temple Meads	N/A	9 – 20 minutes	CrossCountry / GWR
Birmingham New Street	83 – 122 minutes	71 – 93 minutes	CrossCountry
Cardiff Central	47 – 63 minutes	35 – 66 minutes	CrossCountry / GWR
Cheltenham Spa	38 – 68 minutes	29 – 57 minutes	CrossCountry / GWR
Edinburgh Waverley	393 – 399 minutes		CrossCountry
Exeter St Davids	56 – 112 minutes	69–109 minutes	CrossCountry / GWR
Glasgow Central	461 – 471 minutes	456–464 minutes	CrossCountry
Gloucester	38 – 57 minutes	26–44 minutes	CrossCountry / GWR
Leeds	210 – 217 minutes	202–215 minutes	CrossCountry
London Paddington	97 – 152 minutes	83–106 minutes	GWR
Manchester Piccadilly	179 – 180 minutes	168–169 minutes	CrossCountry
Newcastle	299 – 303 minutes	289 - 293 minutes	CrossCountry
Newport	30 – 47 minutes	21–23 minutes	GWR
Paignton	97 – 145 minutes	118 minutes	CrossCountry / GWR
Penzance	236 – 292 minutes		CrossCountry / GWR
Plymouth	114 – 167 minutes		CrossCountry / GWR
Portsmouth Harbour	146 – 164 minutes	N/A	GWR
Reading	68 – 123 minutes	59 minutes	GWR
Salisbury	68 – 86 minutes		GWR
Severn Beach	33 – 38 minutes	N/A	GWR
Sheffield	167 – 172 minutes	159 minutes	CrossCountry
Southampton Central	99 – 116 minutes		GWR
Swansea		80 - 85 minutes	GWR
Swindon	35 – 50 minutes	28 minutes	GWR
Taunton	30 – 75 minutes	42–49 minutes	CrossCountry / GWR
Westbury	37 – 50 minutes	68–75 minutes	GWR
Weston-super-Mare	17 – 39 minutes	47 minutes	CrossCountry / GWR
Weymouth	141 – 148 minutes	167–170 minutes	GWR
Worcester Shrub Hill	90 – 102 minutes	82–84 minutes	GWR
York	240 – 243 minutes		CrossCountry

== Stations ==
=== Current stations ===
Station	Line(s)	Platforms	Usage 08/09	Usage 09/10	Usage 10/11	Usage 11/12	Usage 12/13	Usage 13/14	Usage 14/15	Usage 15/16	Usage 16/17	Usage 17/18	Image
Avonmouth	Severn Beach	2	▲61,948	▲68,448	▲83,674	▲88,642	▲97,880	▲111,440	▲119,924	▲129,860			Avonmouth railway station
Bedminster	Bristol to Exeter	3	▲58,690	▲69,898	▲70,006	▲76,420	▲80,262	▲83,242	▲87,542	▲92,868			Bedminster railway station
Bristol Parkway	Cross Country; South Wales	4	▲2,084,200	▼2,041,548	▲2,114,876	▲2,262,000	▼2,255,298	▼2,215,810	▲2,340,506	▲2,511,016			Bristol Parkway railway station
Bristol Temple Meads	Bristol to Exeter; Cross Country; Great Western; Heart of Wessex; Severn Beach; Wessex	13	▲7,829,628	▲7,875,686	▲8,409,340	▲8,884,626	▲9,099,368	▲9,522,840	▲10,099,526	▲10,711,464			Bristol Temple Meads railway station
Clifton Down	Severn Beach	2	▲281,876	▲361,828	▲433,088	▲470,980	▲522,010	▲573,770	▲619,766	▲672,386			Clifton Down railway station
Filton Abbey Wood	Cross Country	4	▲536,958	▲598,032	▲679,270	▲771,344	▲852,250	▲988,734	▲1,007,780	▲1,021,550			Filton Abbey Wood railway station
Keynsham	Great Western; Heart of Wessex; Wessex	2		249,842	▲278,850	▲306,276	▲329,274	▲358,186	▲412,602	▲424,032			Keynsham railway station
Lawrence Hill	Cross Country; Severn Beach	2	▲67,338	▲74,876	▲93,600	▲102,964	▲124,878	▲136,316	▲150,774	▲157,912			Lawrence Hill railway station
Montpelier	Severn Beach Line	1	▲84,834	▲96,114	▲	▲122,212	▲126,316	▼121,294	▲130,560	▼122,146			Montpelier railway station
Nailsea & Backwell	Bristol to Exeter	2							450,510	▲476,618			
Parson Street	Bristol to Exeter	2	▲46,670	▲57,374	▲68,840	▲77,720	▲87,932	▲102,654	▲114,458	▲126,636			Parson Street railway station
Patchway	South Wales Main Line	2	▲45,280	▲49,812	▲59,474	▲67,422	▲82,198	▲90,404	▲92,540	▲98,296			Patchway railway station
Pilning	South Wales Main Line	1	▲130	▲166	▲178	▼146	▼130	▼88	▼68	▼46			Pilning railway station
Portway Park & Ride	Severn Beach Line	1											Portway Park & Ride railway station
Redland	Severn Beach Line	1	▲86,234	▲86,426	▲92,966	▲96,904	▼94,984	▼93,176	▲105,610	▼99,732			Redland railway station
Sea Mills	Severn Beach Line	1	▲36,358	▲41,680	▲49,082	▲51,998	▲58,310	▼58,106	▲64,512	▼61,696			Sea Mills railway station
Severn Beach	Severn Beach Line	1	▲74,712	▲88,504	▲	▲141,712	▲167,078	▲195,824	▲225,658	▲260,784			Severn Beach railway station
Shirehampton	Severn Beach Line	1	▲34,292	▲35,758	▲42,566	▲43,480	▲50,564	▲51,542	▲52,480	▲56,756			Shirehampton railway station
St Andrews Road	Severn Beach Line	1	▲3,582	▲3,942	▲4,328	▲6,072	▲9,910	▲13,376	▼11,184	▼7,374			St Andrews Road railway station
Stapleton Road	Cross Country Route; Severn Beach Line	2	▲103,576	▲111,532		129,344	▲140,390	▲157,294	▲178,114	▲179,872			Stapleton Road railway station
Yate	Cross Country Route	2				294,934	▲307,148	▲328,832	▲354,004	▲368,910			Yate railway station

=== Heritage stations ===
This is a list of stations currently open on heritage lines.

Station	Line	Platforms	Year closed	Year Reopened	Image
Avon Riverside	Avon Valley Railway	1	N/A	2004	
Bitton	Avon Valley Railway	2	1966	1972	
Oldland Common	Avon Valley Railway	1	1966	1991	

=== Proposed stations ===
This is a list of proposed railway stations in the West of England. (This list includes some former stations)

Station	Line	Platforms	Year closed	Current status	Image
Ashley Down	Cross Country Route	2	1964 (as Ashley Hill)	Opened on the 28th September 2024	
Ashton Gate	Portishead Railway	1	1964/1984	Proposed to reopen	
Charfield	Cross Country	2	1965	Proposed to reopen	
Chittening Platform	Henbury Loop	1	1964	Proposed to reopen	
Long Ashton	Bristol to Exeter	2	1941	Proposed to reopen	
Henbury	Henbury Loop	2	1965	Proposed to reopen	
Horfield	Cross Country Route	2	1964	Proposed to reopen	
North Filton	Henbury Loop	1	1986	Planning application	
Pill	Portishead Railway	2	1964	Proposed to reopen	
Portishead	Portishead Railway	2	1964	Proposed to reopen	
Saltford	Great Western Main Line	2	1970	Proposed to reopen	
St Anne's Park	Great Western Main Line	2	1970	Proposed to reopen	

=== Former stations ===
This is a list of former stations in the West of England area.

Station	Line	Platforms	Year closed	Image
Avonmouth (BPRP)	Severn Beach Line			
Avonmouth Docks	Severn Beach Line			
Avonmouth (Royal Edward)	Severn Beach Line			
Brislington	Bristol and North Somerset Railway	1	1963	
Charlton Halt	Henbury Loop	2	1915	
Clifton Bridge	Portishead Branch	2	1965	
Coalpit Heath	South Wales Main Line; Cross Country Route	2	1961	
Cross Hands Halt	Severn Beach Line	1	1964	
Filton	Cross Country Route		1903	
Filton Junction	Cross Country Route		1996	
Fishponds	Bristol and Gloucester Railway	2	1966	
Hallen	Henbury Loop	2	1918	
Ham Green	Portishead Branch	1	1964	
Horfield	Cross Country Route	2	1964	
Hotwells	Bristol Port Railway and Pier	2	1921	
Hotwells Halt	Bristol Port Railway and Pier	1	1922	
Kelston	Mangotsfield Branch Line	2	1949	
Mangotsfield	Mangotsfield and Bath Branch Line; Bristol and Gloucester Railway	6	1966	
New Passage Halt	Severn Beach Line	1	1964	
New Passage Pier	Severn Beach Line		1886	
Nightingale Valley Halt	Portishead Railway	1	1932	
Portbury	Portishead Branch	1	1962	
St Philip's	Bristol and Gloucester Railway	1	1967	
Staple Hill	Bristol and Gloucester Railway	2	1966	
Thornbury	Thornbury Branch	1	1944	
Warmley	Mangotsfield and Bath Branch Line	2	1966	
Wickwar	Cross Country	2	1965	
Winterbourne	Cross Country; South Wales	2	1963	
Whitchurch Halt	Bristol and North Somerset Railway	1	1959	

== Railway lines ==
There are six railway lines running through Bristol.

=== Bristol to Exeter line ===
The Bristol to Exeter line runs between Bristol and Exeter via the Nailsea, Weston-super-Mare, Bridgwater and Taunton. It is served by local First Great Western services, and used by Cross-Country and Intercity trains headed towards Plymouth.

=== Cross-Country Route ===
The North-East/South-West route (sometimes simply The Cross-Country Route) is the major British rail route running from South West England or Cardiff via Bristol, Birmingham, Derby and Sheffield to North-East England and Scotland. It includes some of the longest inter-city rail journeys in the UK, e.g. Penzance to Aberdeen. It remains a major freight route, although now largely usurped by the M5, M6 and M1 motorways.

The route shares parts of the Great Western Main Line, Midland Main Line, Sheffield to Hull Line, the East Coast Main Line and the core Cardiff-Bristol-Birmingham-Derby route.

In November 2018 tracks were doubled from Bristol Temple Meads through Lawrence Hill to Filton Abbey Wood stations to increase capacity, back to the original four tracks.

=== Great Western Main Line ===
The Great Western Main Line is a main line railway in England that runs westwards from London Paddington station to Temple Meads station in Bristol.

=== Severn Beach Line ===
The route runs from Bristol Temple Meads to Severn Beach via Lawrence Hill, Stapleton Road, Montpelier, Redland, Clifton Down, Sea Mills, Shirehampton, Avonmouth, St Andrews Road before reaching terminus at Severn Beach. The journey takes approximately 45 minutes.

Following a successful campaign by FOSBR (Friends of Suburban Bristol Railway), the Severn Beach Line is going to have an increased frequency from December 2007 to March 2010. It is hoped this will pave the way for better services across the conurbation. An additional train will operate on the line meaning services should be at the least every 40 mins.

=== South Wales Main Line ===
The South Wales Main Line is a branch of the Great Western Main Line. It diverges from the main line at Wootton Bassett near Swindon, first calling at Bristol Parkway, after which the line continues through the Severn Tunnel into South Wales.

=== Wessex Main Line ===
The Wessex Main Line is the railway line from Bristol Temple Meads to Southampton. Diverging from this route is the Heart of Wessex Line from Westbury to Weymouth.

=== Proposed light rail or rapid transit ===
In November 2016, the West of England Local Enterprise Partnership began a consultation process on their Transport Vision Summary Document, outlining potential light rail/tram routes from the city centre to Bristol Airport, the eastern and north west fringes of the city, and a route along the A4 road to Bath. By 2017, this proposal had changed to a mass transit network with potential for underground sections, linking the city centre with the northern and eastern fringes of the city and the airport.

== Train operators ==
=== Current train operators ===
Operator	Years	Image	Major services
CrossCountry	2007–2019	CrossCountry	Bristol to Manchester Piccadilly; Plymouth and the south west to Newcastle and Scotland
Great Western Railway (GWR)	1996–2020	Great Western Railway	London Paddington to Bristol Temple Meads; London Paddington to Cardiff Central and Swansea via Bristol Parkway; Cardiff Central to Taunton; Cardiff Central to Portsmouth Harbour; Bristol Parkway to Weston-super-Mare; Bristol Temple Meads to Avonmouth and Severn Beach; Gloucester to Weymouth

=== Former train operators ===
Operator	Years	Image	Services
Post-nationalisation
British Rail	1948–1986		All services
Post-sectorisation
InterCity	1986–1996	InterCity	London Paddington to Bristol Temple Meads; London Paddington to Cardiff Central and Swansea via Bristol Parkway; Plymouth and the south west to the north and Scotland
Regional Railways	1986–1996	Regional Railways	All non-InterCity services
Post-privatisation
South West Trains	2004–2017	South West Trains	Bristol Temple Meads to London Waterloo via Salisbury from 2004
South Western Railway (SWR)	2017-2021		Bristol Temple Meads to London Waterloo via Salisbury
Virgin CrossCountry	1997–2007	Virgin Trains	Bristol to Manchester Piccadilly; Plymouth and the south west to Newcastle and Scotland
Wales & Borders	2001–2003	Wales & Borders	
Wales & West	1997–2001	Wales & West	
Wessex Trains	2001–2006	Wessex Trains	All local and non-express inter-city services.

There have also been a number of other companies pre-nationalisation, including:

- Great Western Railway
- Midland Railway
- Bristol and Gloucester Railway
- Birmingham and Bristol Railway
- Bristol Port Railway and Pier
- Bristol and North Somerset Railway
- Portishead Railway

=== MetroWest ===
MetroWest is a current initiative in the West of England area to improve local rail services by reopening disused rail lines and stations and improving existing services. Phase One includes reopening the Portishead railway line to passenger traffic and improving services to the Severn Beach Line and Bath Spa. Phase Two will see the Henbury railway line reopen, along with half-hourly services between Weston-super-Mare and Yate. The phases are due to open in 2019 and 2021 respectively.

The West of England Local Enterprise Partnership also produced a Key Principles Report in November 2015 discussing future potential transport projects for the West of England region, including new rail transit based options referred to as MetroWest++. The options outlined include reopening the Thornbury Branch Line, a Yate to Bath route, the use of tram train technology, a link to the city centre and a connection to Bristol Airport.

== See also ==
- MetroWest (Bristol)
- Public transport in Bristol
- Friends of Suburban Bristol Railways
