= Chittening Platform railway station =

Former railway station in England

Coordinates: 51°31′30″N 2°40′30″W

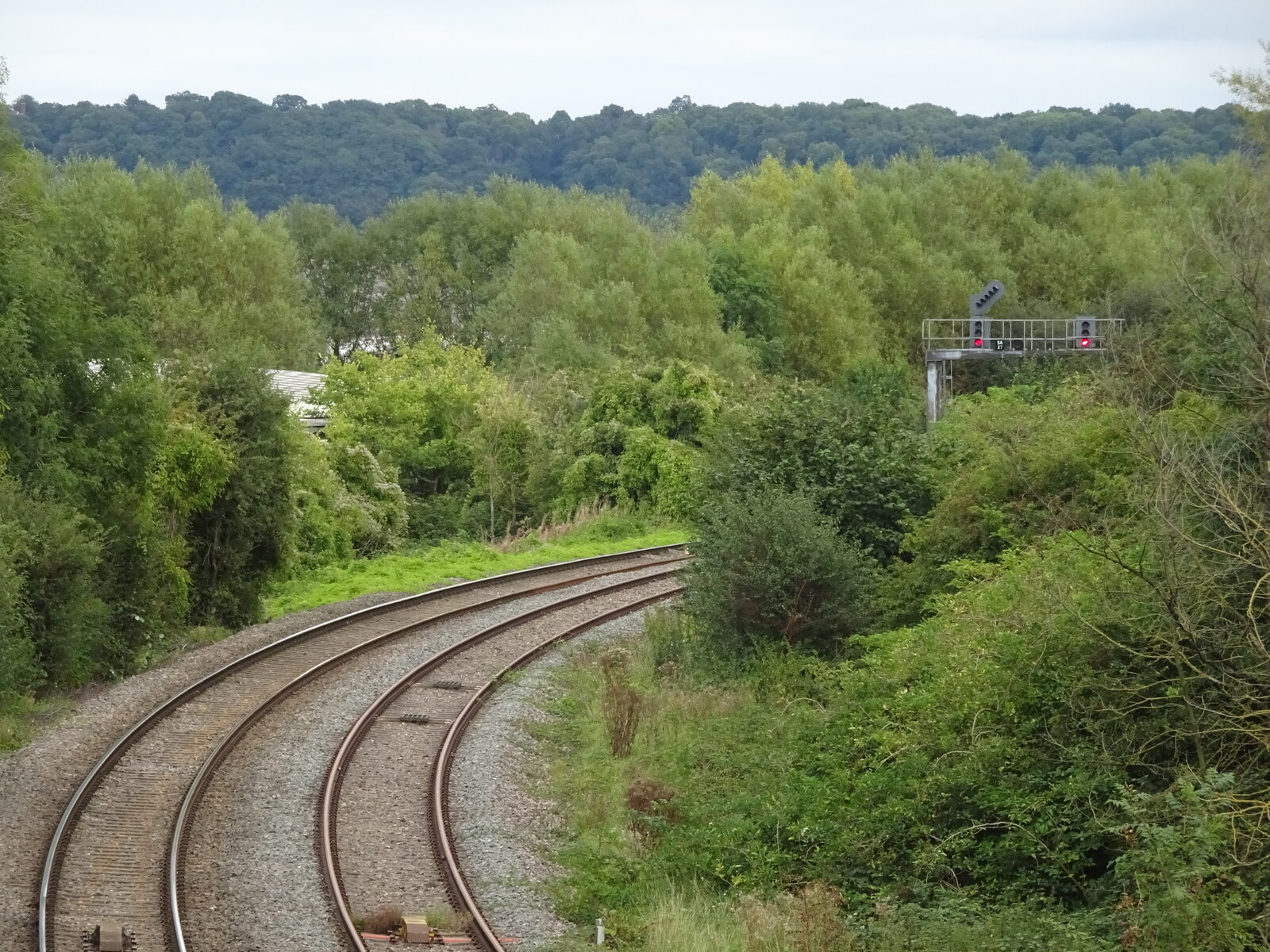
Chittening Platform railway station (site), Gloucestershire

Chittening Platform railway station was a station on the former Great Western Railway between Filton and Avonmouth.

== History ==
The station was opened on 5 March 1917 to serve a large government munitions factory at Chittening. The factory project was abandoned when the United States entered the First World War, but the station remained open to serve employees at the Chittening Trading Estate until 1923.

It was reopened unadvertised for workers on 27 October 1941, and opened to the public fully on 31 May 1948. The station never served goods trains. It was closed on 23 November 1964, when passenger traffic ceased on the Avonmouth and Filton line. The station was immortalised in 1964 in the song "Slow Train" by Flanders and Swann.

The line past the site remains open for goods traffic, and is now known as the Henbury Loop.

== Future ==
Improved services on the Severn Beach Line are called for as part of the Greater Bristol Metro scheme, a rail transport plan which aims to enhance transport capacity in the Bristol area. It has been suggested that the Henbury Loop Line be reopened as part of the scheme, with the possibility of services running from Bristol Temple Meads to Bristol Parkway via Clifton Down and Henbury. The Metro scheme was given the go-ahead in July 2012 as part of the City Deal, whereby local councils would be given greater control over money by the government.

Friends of Suburban Bristol Railways are also campaigning to get Chittening reopened along with Henbury and North Filton.

Preceding station	National Rail	Following station
St Andrews Road	Great Western Railway Henbury Loop Line	Hallen Halt Line open, station closed
