= North Filton Platform railway station =

Former railway station in England

North Filton Platform
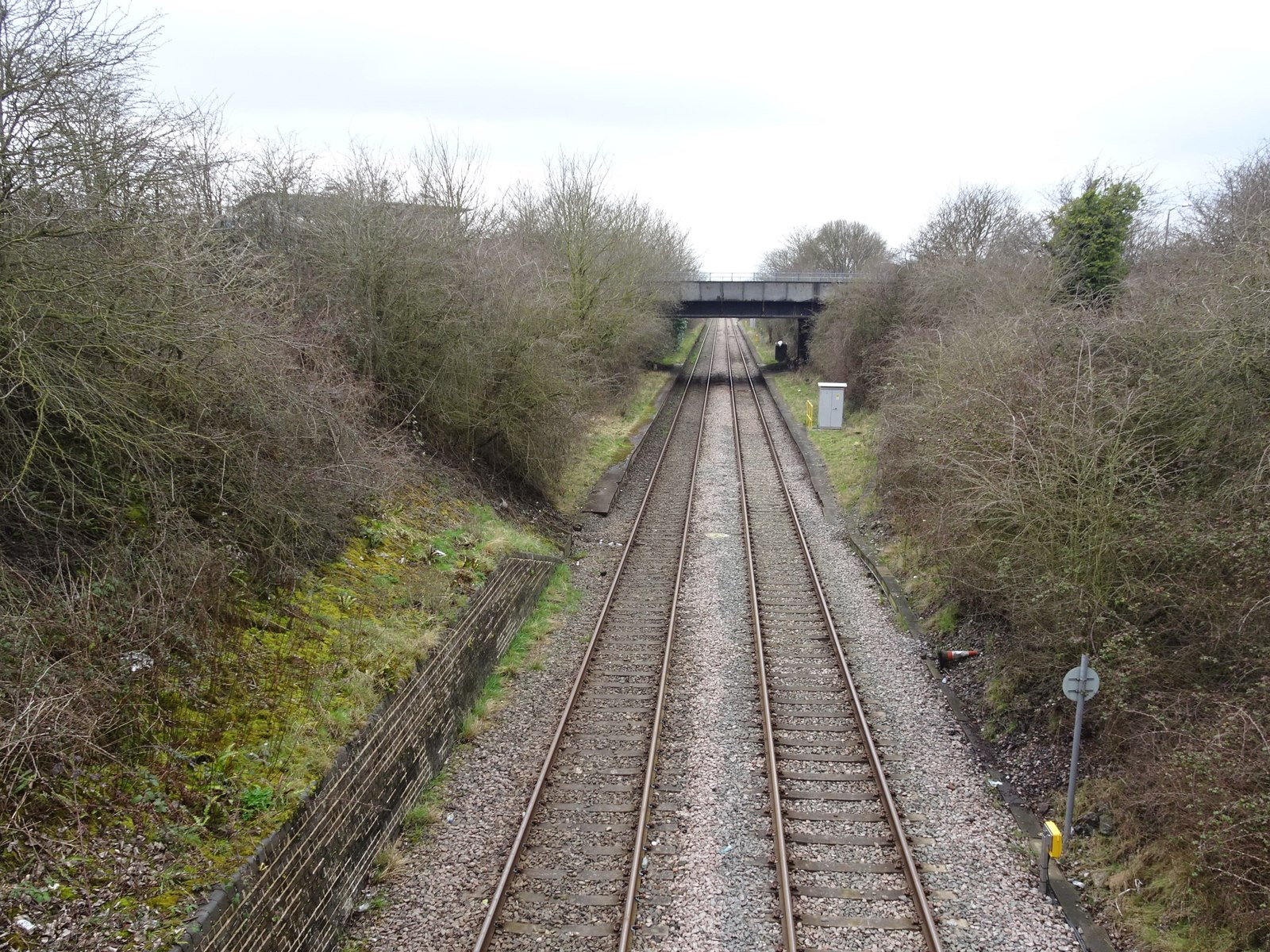
- The remains of the railway station, under the bridge, in 2018

General information
- Location: Filton, South Gloucestershire; England
- Coordinates: 51.5171°N 2.5728°W
- Grid reference: ST603799

Other information
- Status: Demolished

History
- Original company: Great Western Railway
- Pre-grouping: Great Western Railway
- Post-grouping: Great Western Railway

Key dates
- 9 May 1910: Opened as Filton Halt
- 22 March 1915: Closed
- 1926: Reopened as North Filton Platform
- 23 November 1964: Regular public services ceased
- 12 May 1986: Complete closure
Location

North Filton Platform was a railway station which served the northern part of Filton, Gloucestershire, England. It was on the railway line between Filton and Avonmouth, and was situated on the western side of Gloucester Road (the present A38).

== History ==
The railway line between Stoke Gifford Junction and Holesmouth Junction (Avonmouth), now known as the Henbury Loop Line, was opened by the Great Western Railway (GWR) on 9 May 1910, together with the Filton West Loop (Filton Junction to Filton West Junction). Among the stations on that line which opened the same day was one originally known as Filton Halt. It closed less than five years later, on 22 March 1915.

The station was reopened either on 12 July 1926 or 20 September 1926, and was then known as North Filton Platform.

Regular passenger services ceased from 23 November 1964, but workman trains continued until 12 May 1986.

== Reopening ==
Friends of Suburban Bristol Railways (FOSBR) and other local rail campaign groups have long supported the reopening of the Henbury Line to passengers, as well as the stations at North Filton and Henbury. FOSBR suggest this would help services along the Severn Beach line, allowing a Bristol Temple Meads-Avonmouth-Bristol Parkway service, and provide services to the north of Bristol generally, the Cribbs Causeway shopping centre, and the redevelopment at Filton Aerodrome. Around 2011, FOSBR said local councils had committed to a feasibility study into reopening the line. In December 2011, a South Gloucestershire Council planning committee recommended that the station, along with Henbury station, be re-opened for passenger services.

In 2021, a planning application was submitted for a new station. This was granted in January 2023 with a planned opening date of 2026.

== Notes ==
Preceding station	Historical railways	Following station
Filton Junction; Line closed, station open	Great Western Railway; Henbury Loop Line	Charlton Halt; Line and station closed
Winterbourne; Line and station closed	Great Western Railway; Henbury Loop Line	Charlton Halt; Line and station closed
