= Charlton Halt railway station =

Charlton Halt railway station may refer to:

- Charlton Halt railway station (Oxfordshire)
- Charlton Halt railway station (Bristol)
