= Portway Park & Ride railway station =

Railway station in City of Bristol, England

Portway Park & Ride
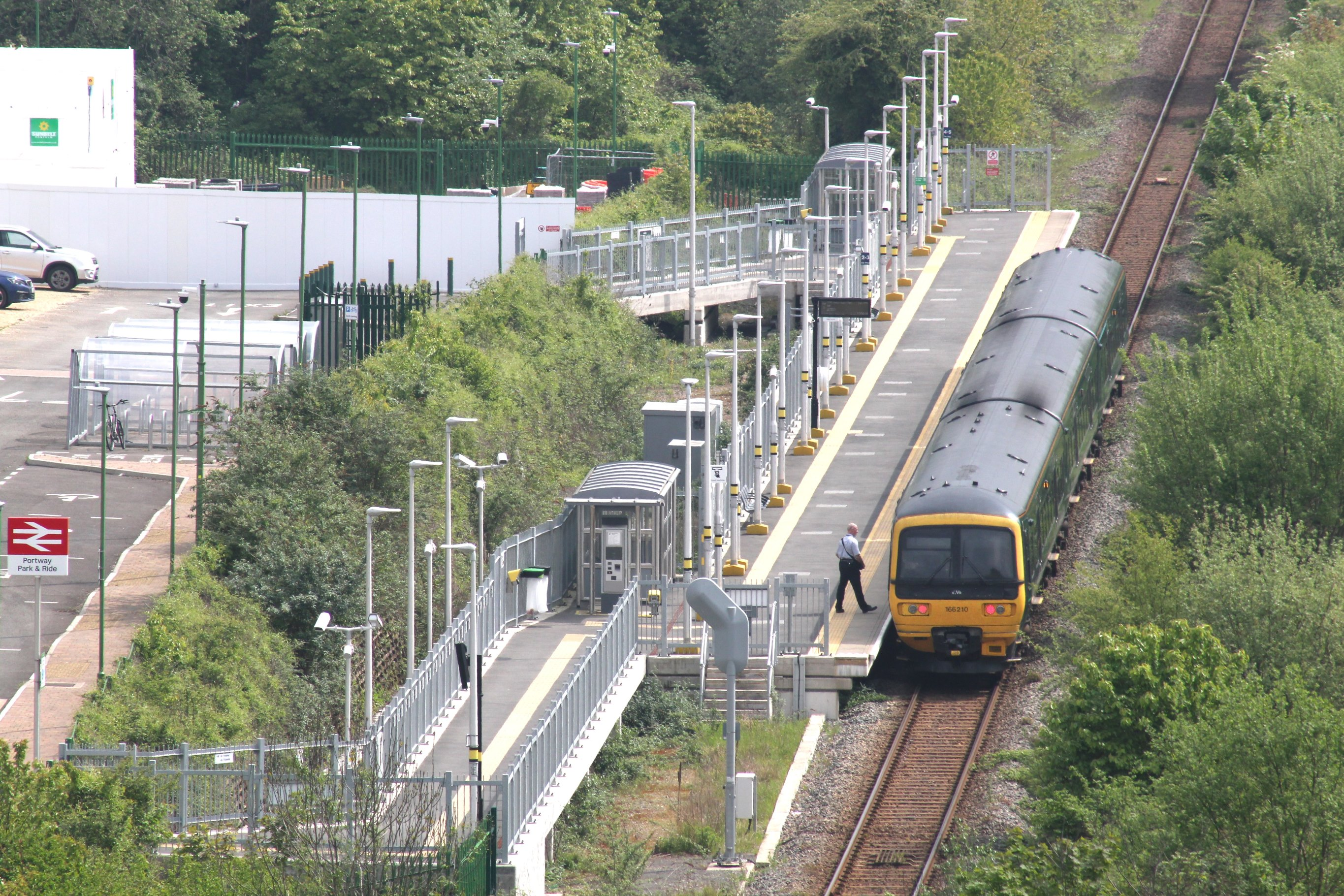

General information
- Location: Avonmouth, Bristol; England
- Coordinates: 51°29′19″N 2°41′17″W
- Operator: Great Western Railway
- Platforms: 1

Other information
- Station code: PRI

History
- Opened: 1 August 2023

Passengers
- 2023/24: 30,168
- 2024/25: ▲59,376
- 2025/26: ▲81,112
Location
Notes
- Passenger statistics from the Office of Rail and Road

Portway Park & Ride is a railway station on the Severn Beach line in the Avonmouth district of Bristol, England. The station is about 5 miles (8 km) north-west of Bristol city centre and close to the M5 motorway. Its three letter station code is PRI. It serves the Portway park and ride facility on the A4 Portway, and opened on 1 August 2023 as part of the MetroWest package of improvements to railways in the area.

== History ==
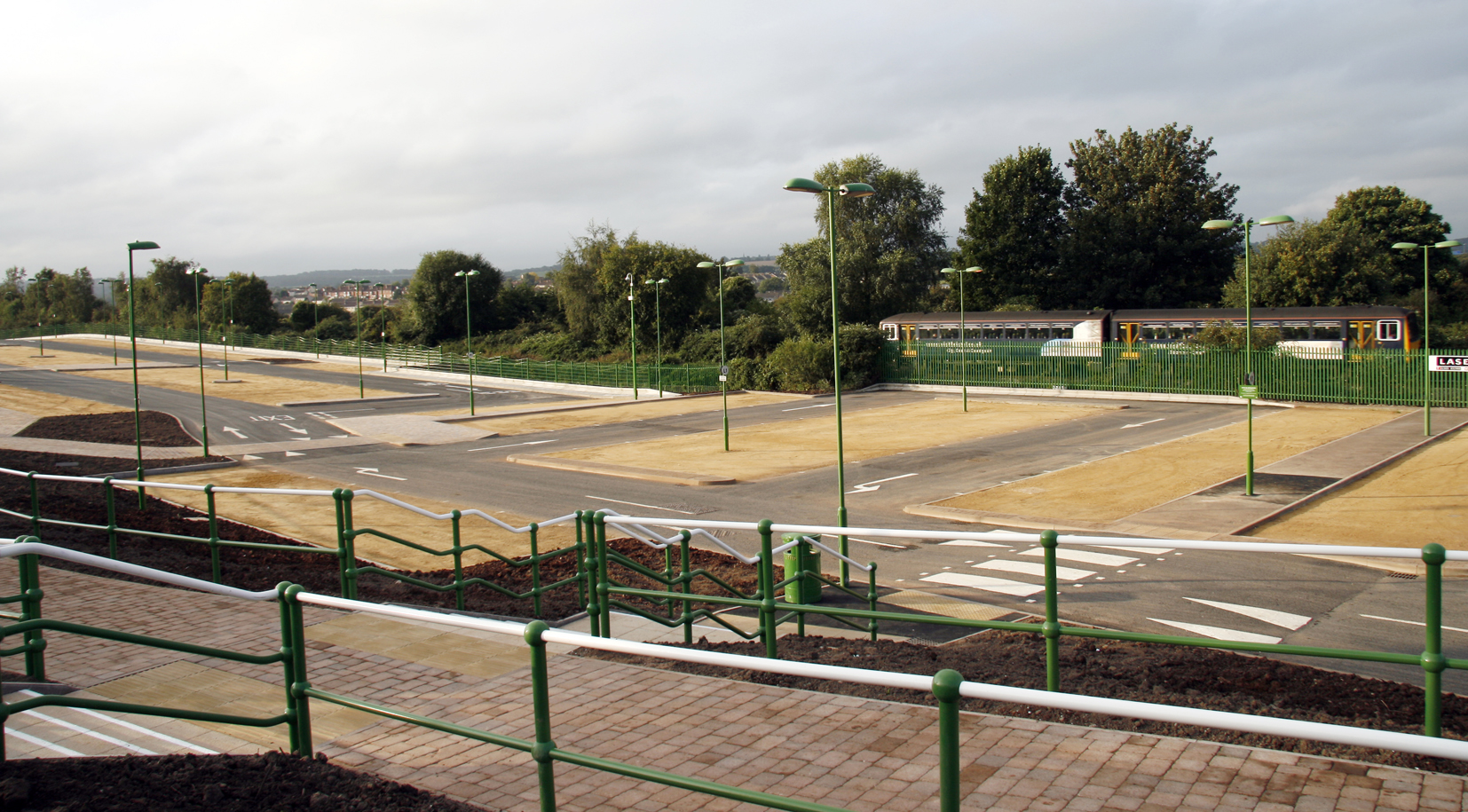
The park and ride site in 2008, with a Severn Beach train in the background

The railway through the site was inaugurated on 6 March 1865, when services began on the Bristol Port Railway and Pier (BPRP), a self-contained railway which ran along the north bank of the River Avon to a deep-water pier on the Severn Estuary at Avonmouth. The route was 4 ft 8 1/2 in (1,435 mm) standard gauge single-track. The BPRP encountered difficulties in 1871, when the terminal pier at Avonmouth became difficult to use due to a build-up of silt.

With no prospect of a proper dock being funded without a connection to the national railway network, the Clifton Extension Railway (CER) was approved. This was a joint venture by the BPRP, Great Western Railway and Midland Railway which ran from Sneyd Park Junction, south of Sea Mills, via Clifton Down, to join the national network at Narroways Hill Junction. The link opened in 1877. Despite the increased traffic the BPRP suffered financially, and was taken over by the CER in 1890. When the railways were nationalised in 1948, the line came under the aegis of the Western Region of British Railways and, upon privatisation, transferred to Railtrack and later Network Rail.

A park and ride was opened near junction 18 of the M5 motorway, adjacent to the railway, in 2002.

== Station proposal and construction ==
In 2009, it was proposed that a railway station should be built. The plan was supported by Friends of Suburban Bristol Railways and the Bristol branch of the National Union of Rail, Maritime and Transport Workers. The plan was approved in October 2012.

In 2017, £2.23 million was allocated for construction, of which £1.67 million came from the government's New Stations Fund, with additional funding coming from the West of England Combined Authority and West of England Local Enterprise Partnership. Ground surveys began in 2017, with completion originally planned for 2019; however, planning permission was not granted until March 2019. In December 2019, it was reported that the cost estimate had risen to between £3.4 million and £3.6 million. The station remained part of MetroWest's plan for 2020–2025 and spending of £1.5m was moved to the 2021–2022 year.

Preparation began in December 2021 with vegetation clearance and the setting up of a site compound. The main works commenced in February 2022. The station has a single platform, suitable for five-car trains. There are seven disabled parking spaces by the access point, and there is parking for 40 bicycles.

The station was initially expected to be open in the summer of 2022. However, this was later delayed and then again further in November 2022 due to some problems with electrical supplies and cabling.

In June 2023, the Office of Rail and Road gave its authorisation for the station to open, with Great Western Railway confirming the station would open on 1 August 2023. The transport secretary, Mark Harper, and the Mayor of the West of England, Dan Norris, were present at the opening ceremony on 31 July, but Mayor of Bristol Marvin Rees did not attend as planned and the city council was represented by cabinet member for transport, Councillor Don Alexander. It is the first new railway station in the city for 96 years, after Parson Street which opened in 1927. Around 830 parking spaces supplement the station.

== Services ==
The normal off-peak service is as follows:

- 2 tph to Avonmouth of which 1 continues to Severn Beach
- 2 tph to Bristol Temple Meads of which 1 continues to Weston-super-Mare

On Sundays, there is 1 train per hour to Severn Beach and 1 train per hour to Weston-super-Mare for most of the day.

Preceding station	National Rail	Following station
Shirehampton	Great Western Railway; Severn Beach Line	Avonmouth
