= Avonmouth Docks railway station =

Disused railway station in Avonmouth, Bristol

Avonmouth Docks
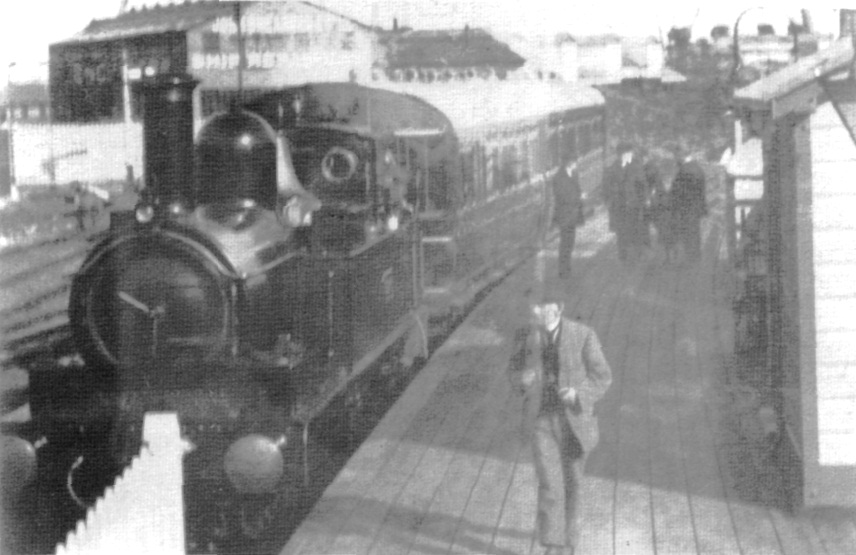
- The only known photograph of the station.

General information
- Location: Avonmouth, Bristol; England
- Coordinates: 51.5000°N 2.7023°W
- Platforms: 1

Other information
- Status: Disused

History
- Original company: Great Western Railway
- Pre-grouping: Great Western Railway

Key dates
- 9 May 1910: Opened
- 22 March 1915: Last train runs
- 28 April 1919: Officially closed
Location

Avonmouth Docks railway station was in the Avonmouth district of Bristol. It was opened by the Great Western Railway on 9 May 1910 as a terminus for trains on the Henbury Loop Line. The last train to the station ran on 22 March 1915, after which it was closed as a First World War economy measure. It officially closed on 28 April 1919.

Preceding station	Historical railways	Following station
Hallen Halt	Great Western Railway; Henbury Loop Line (1910-1915)	Terminus

== See also ==
- Avonmouth railway station, formerly known as Avonmouth Dock station, the currently operational station in Avonmouth
