= Hallen, Gloucestershire =

Village in Gloucestershire, England

Coordinates: 51.5167°N 2.65°W

Hallen
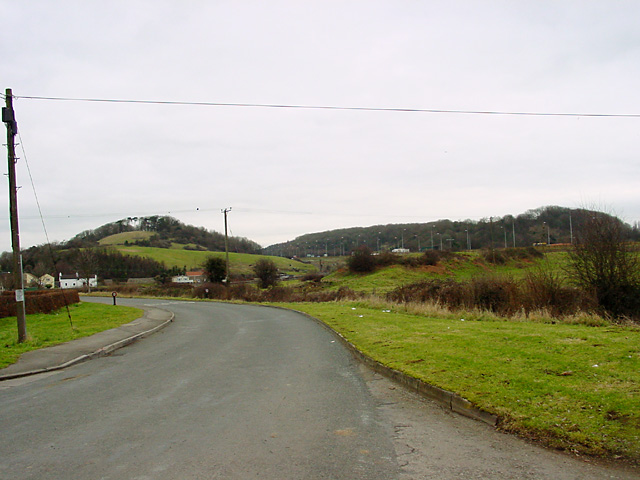
- Hallen showing Haw Wood. The M5 is on the right

- Location within Gloucestershire
- OS grid reference: ST551800
- Civil parish: Almondsbury
- Unitary authority: South Gloucestershire
- Ceremonial county: Gloucestershire
- Region: South West
- Country: England
- Sovereign state: United Kingdom
- Post town: BRISTOL
- Postcode district: BS10
- Dialling code: 0117
- Police: Avon and Somerset
- Fire: Avon
- Ambulance: South Western
- UK Parliament: Thornbury and Yate

Hallen is a village in South Gloucestershire, England, just north of the Bristol city boundary. It is southwest of Easter Compton, northeast of Avonmouth and northwest of Henbury. The village lies at the edge of the Severn floodplain, sandwiched between the M49 and M5 motorways. It is sometimes claimed that the name "Hallen" is from the Welsh for salt, 'halen', or from an Anglo-Saxon word of the same meaning, however, 16th century spellings (e.g. Hallyende) make it clear that this is not the case; the name is apparently Middle or Early Modern English from 'hall' (hall) or 'hale' (nook, corner, stretch of alluvial land) + 'ende' (end).

For administrative purposes Hallen is a ward in the civil parish of Almondsbury, although it is some 5 miles from the village of Almondsbury. Historically it was in the large parish of Henbury, and was transferred to Almondsbury in 1935 when most of Henbury was absorbed into Bristol.

The Henbury Loop railway line passes the village to the south. When the line was opened in 1910 the village was served by Hallen Halt station, but the halt closed in 1915. The loop construction made a railway embankment along one side of the village. It was during the excavation that a natural water spring was blocked. This destroyed the watercress fields that used to be a major income for the village.

A large underground petroleum storage facility was built into the hillside behind the village during World War II, to provide protection from German bombing. The facility is still in use today.

In the 19th and early 20th centuries, Hallen was a popular stop off point for travellers making their way from the South West to the Aust Ferry, which would cross the River Severn to Wales. There were three inns in the village, one with its own brewery. The brewery structure is still visible today attached to the last remaining pub, The King William IV.

The village retains some old world charm in places (War Memorial and Oakhill Lane cottages), but has been bisected by the M5 motorway which has left it somewhat desolate.

== Sport and leisure ==
Hallen has a Non-League football club Hallen A.F.C. who play at The Hallen Centre.

== Notable people ==
- Lee Fairman, chairman of Hallen AFC.
