= Severnside Community Rail Partnership =

A map of the Severnside CRP area, with relevant railway routes shown in black

The Severnside Community Rail Partnership is a community rail partnership in England, covering the network of routes radiating from Bristol. Its area is bounded by Gloucester, Bath/Freshford, Weston-super-Mare, Taunton, and the Severn Estuary. The body was founded in 2004, and is principally sponsored by local councils.

The partnership's founder and chairman, Keith Walton, was made an MBE in the 2024 New Year Honours.

== See also ==
- Bristol Rail Campaign
