= Bristol Rail Campaign =

Campaign group in Bristol, England

Bristol Rail Campaign (formerly FoSBR, Friends of Bristol Suburban Railways) is a Bristol-based campaign group, calling for better rail transport in the Bristol area.

== Formation ==
Bristol Rail Campaign was formed in 1995 as Friends of Severn Beach Railway, to protest against the potential demise of the Severn Beach Line, a single-track branch line in Bristol. Services at the time had been reduced along the line from Bristol Temple Meads to Severn Beach, with many services replaced by buses. The first FoSBR action was on 25 September 1995, when a group of protestors met at Avonmouth railway station with buggies and bicycles, to show that buses were not a suitable replacement for trains. The group later changed its name to Friends of Suburban Bristol Railways, allowing it to keep the FoSBR acronym.

FoSBR changed its campaign name to Bristol Rail Campaign in 2023, stating: "We have found that people find it confusing, don’t get it right and don’t remember it. We need a simple name that says clearly what we are. That name is Bristol Rail Campaign.".

== Campaigns ==
Bristol Rail Campaign is centred on its Plan for Rail. This sets out to deliver the backbone of a sustainable transport system based on the region’s underused suburban rail network.

=== Severn Beach Line ===
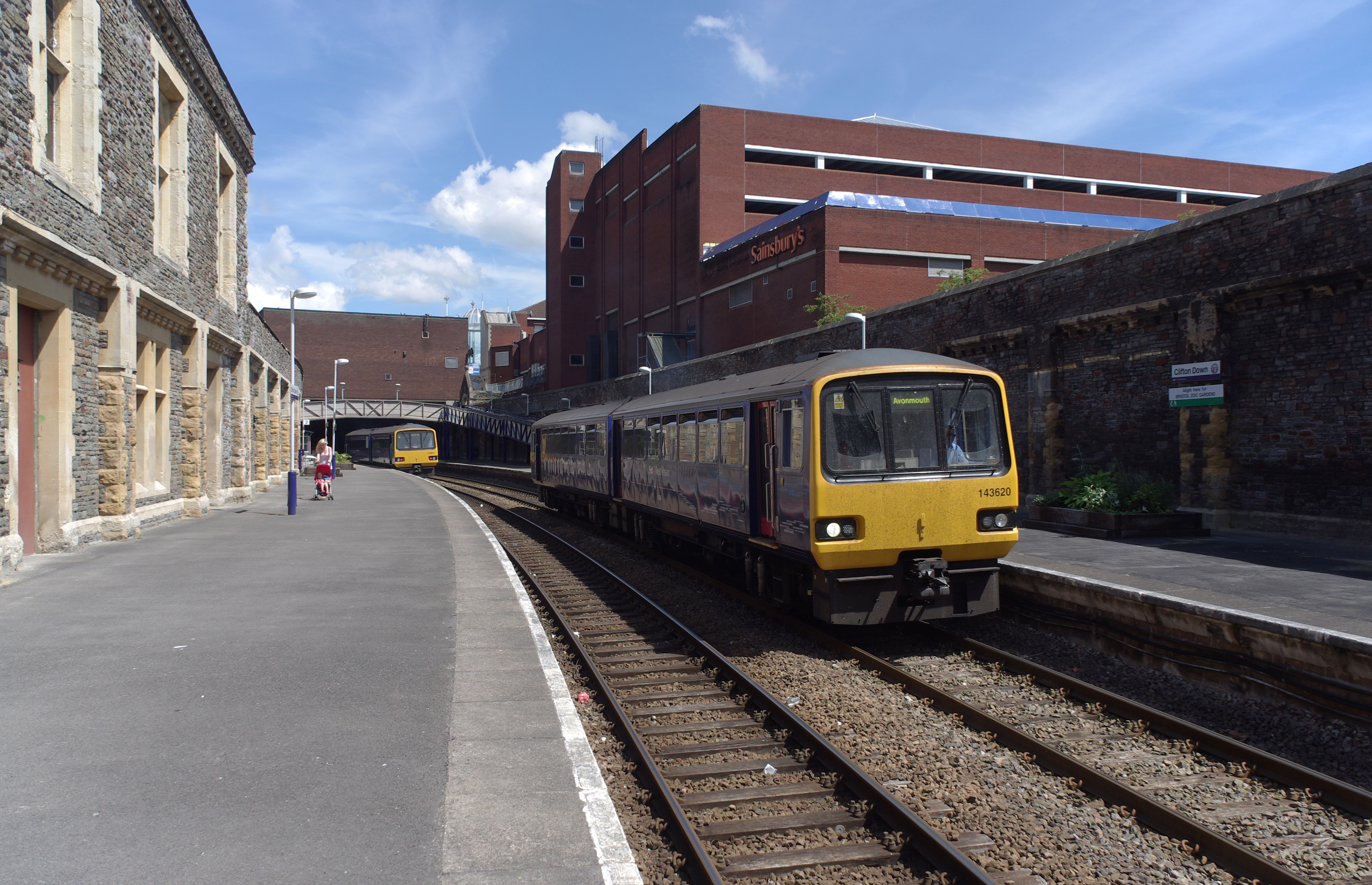
Two Severn Beach Line trains pass at Clifton Down. FoSBR successfully campaigned for an improved service on this line.

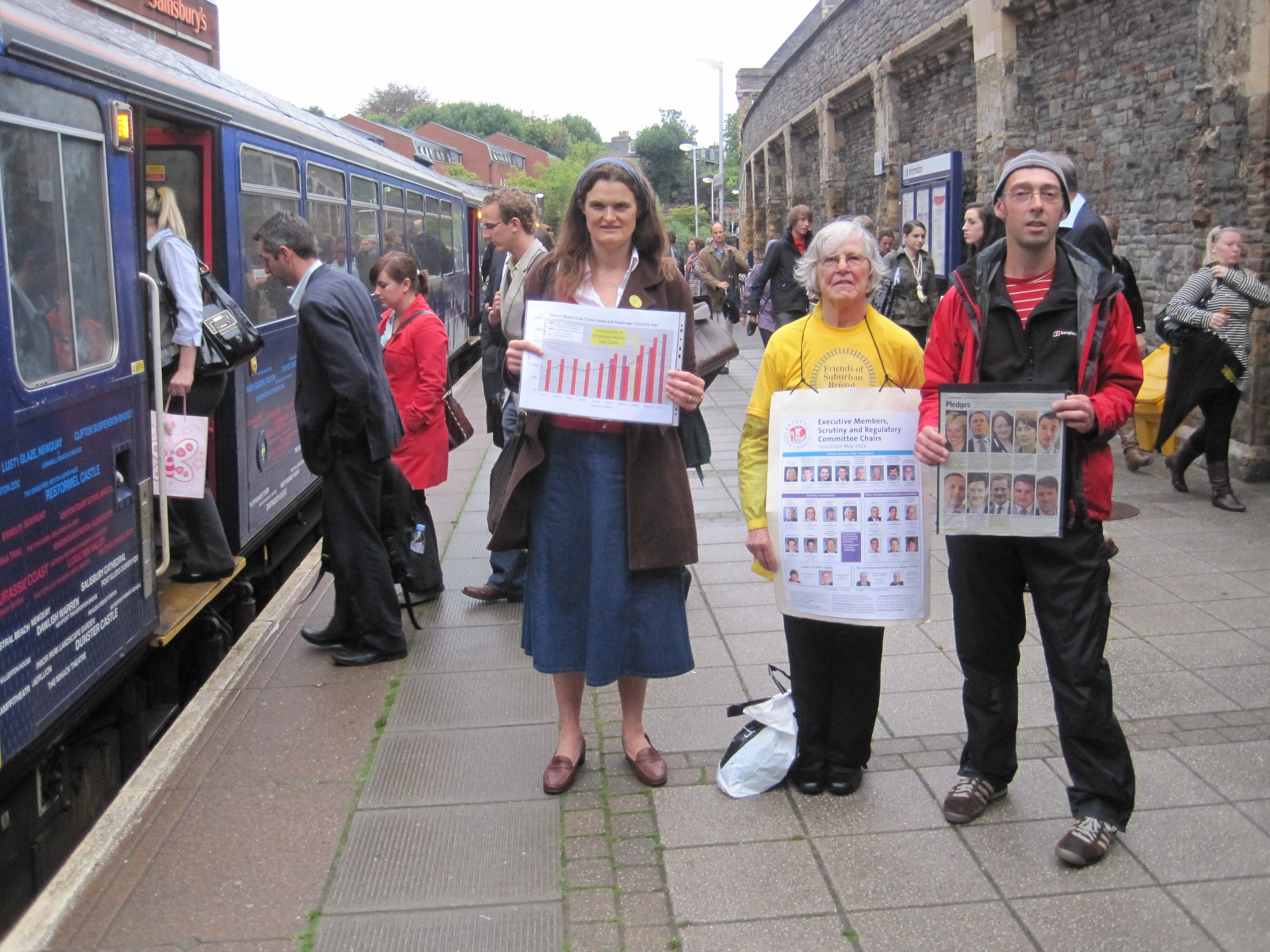
FoSBR members campaigning at Clifton Down.

FoSBR's first campaign was for a better service on the Severn Beach Line, an important Bristol commuter line connecting Bristol Temple Meads to Severn Beach and Avonmouth via Clifton. The line had few services, no service at all on Sundays, and very few trains travelled the entire length of the line to Severn Beach. Following action by FoSBR and a string of protests, Bristol City Council agreed to subsidise a service of at least one train every 45mins in each direction along the line. This continued until 2007 when a 1-hour minimum service was written into the Greater Western passenger franchise. In 2007, the Council unanimously agreed to pay £450,000 per year to fund extra services from May 2008 for three years, which resulted in a 60% increase in passenger numbers along the line, and a 25% year-on-year increase between June 2009 and June 2010. Passenger numbers on the line increased by 90% over the period 2008–11, and 25% in the period 2010–11. The Council cut the subsidy paid by half, saying the extra passengers were allowing the line to support itself, which prompted criticism by FoSBR, saying the money should be used to provide evening trains and through services to Bedminster and Parson Street. FoSBR's ambition was realised in 2021, when daily through trains were introduced between Severn Beach and Weston-super-Mare

Services along the line run approximately half-hourly between Avonmouth and Bristol Temple Meads, with alternate trains extending to Severn Beach.

Bristol Rail Campaign supported the opening of a station to serve the A4 Portway Park & Ride scheme in Shirehampton. They argued that buses often have to deal with heavy traffic on the A4 Portway to reach the city centre, and that a rail link would be quicker and greener. Portway Park & Ride Station was officially opened on 31 July 2023, with passenger services starting the next day.

Bristol Rail Campaign has also suggested the Severn Beach Line be electrified as part of the electrification of the Great Western Main Line. They were supported in this by Stephen Williams, the former MP for Bristol West.

=== Henbury Loop ===
Bristol Rail Campaign supports plans for the Henbury Loop Line, a freight line in the north of Bristol which has not seen passenger traffic since the 1960s. This would include the reopening of Henbury and North Filton railway stations, both of which closed to passengers in 1964. Bristol Rail Campaign suggest this would help services along the Severn Beach Line, allowing a Temple Meads–Avonmouth–Bristol Parkway service, and also provide services to the north of Bristol generally, the Cribbs Causeway shopping centre, and the redevelopment at Filton Aerodrome. FoSBR say that local councils have committed to a feasibility study into reopening the line.

=== Filton Bank ===
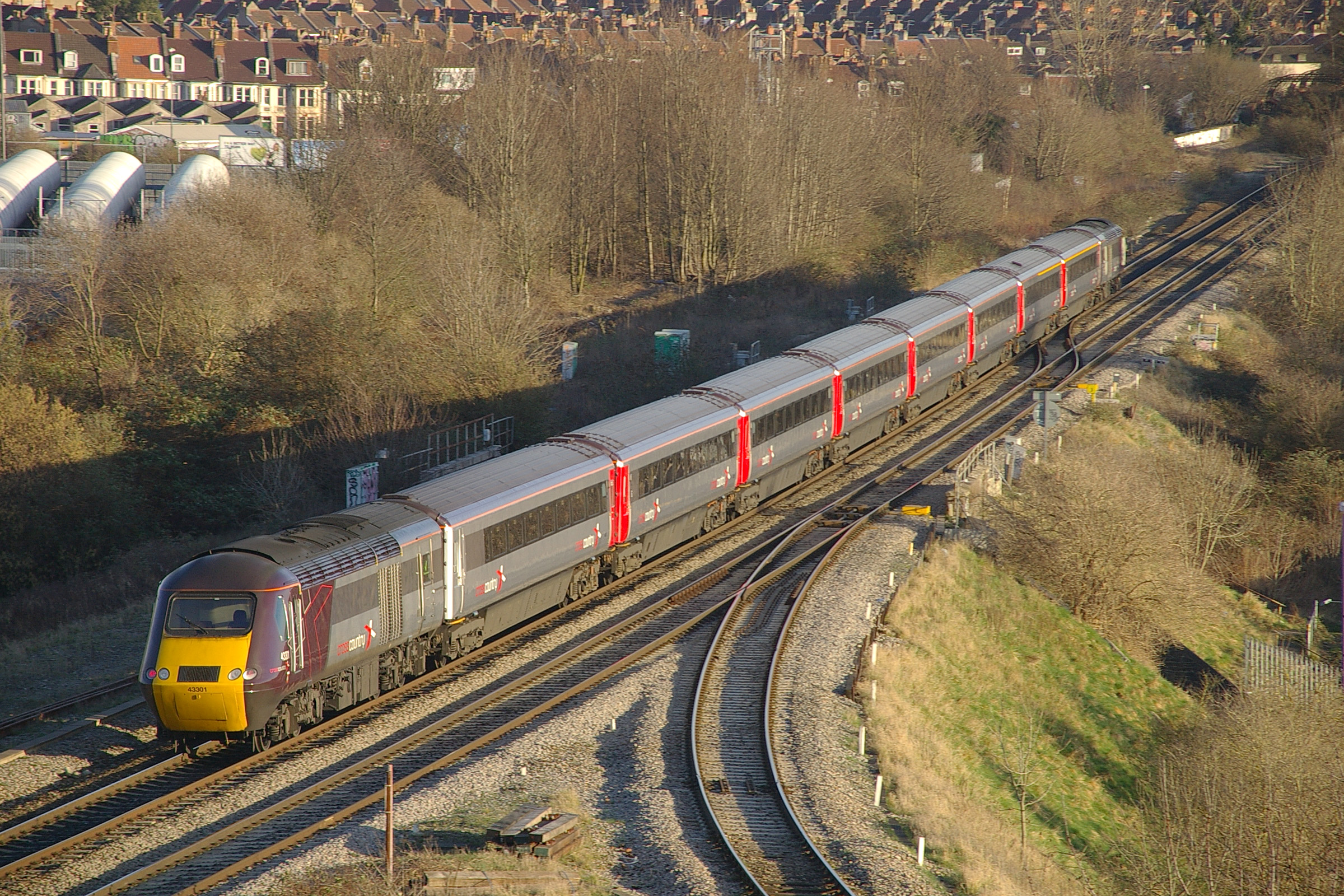
FoSBR supported the four-tracking of Filton Bank. Here a CrossCountry service heads south along Filton Bank.

The line between Bristol Temple Meads and Bristol Parkway, commonly known as Filton Bank was reduced from four tracks to two in 1984 as a cost-saving measure. It was frequently congested.

Bristol Rail Campaign was part of a successful campaign to reinstate this as a four-track railway. These works, which included the rebuilding of a viaduct at Stapleton Road, were completed in 2018.

=== Electrification to Weston-super-Mare ===
The Great Western Main Line, the major railway between London and Bristol, was electrified in the 2010s as part of a major upgrade scheme. The entire line between London Paddington, Bristol Temple Meads and Cardiff Central was due to be electrified by 2017, as was the line between Temple Meads and Parkway. However, FoSBR are concerned that since the new electric Intercity Express Programme (IEP) trains will not be able to operate beyond Bristol, direct services between London and Weston-super-Mare will be discontinued. FoSBR therefore support the extension of electrification to Weston-super-Mare, and of the Severn Beach Line, to provide passengers with "better, more reliable services".

FoSBR also supported the building of the Stoke Gifford depot for Intercity Express Trains, against local opposition. 550 local residents signed a petition against the depot, citing light, noise and water pollution concerns. FoSBR released a joint statement with Daniel Casey of the Green Party and Dave Wood of the National Union of Rail, Maritime and Transport Workers, saying that the residents' concerns were unfounded, noting several methods of noise/light/water pollution prevention that would be used, and also mentioning that the nearby motorways, Filton Airfield and night-time freight trains on the South Wales Main Line would all produce more background noise than the depot would.

=== MetroWest ===
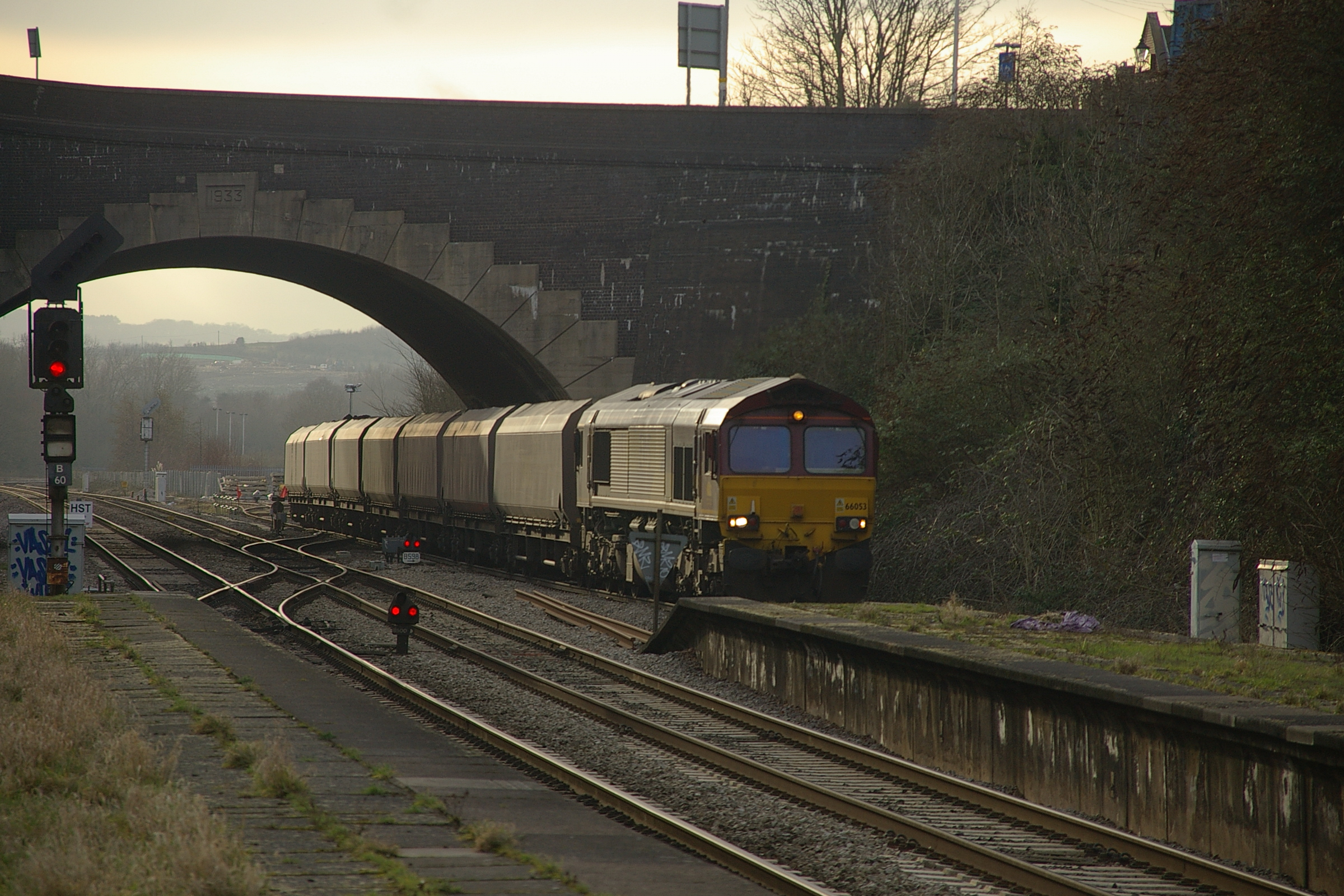
FoSBR support the reopening of the Portishead Branch Line to passengers. It is only in use for coal traffic to Royal Portbury Docks.

=== Portishead Line ===
Bristol Rail Campaign supports the reopening of the Portishead Branch Line to passenger services. The line was closed in the 1960s, but was reopened in the early 2000s for freight trains to serve Royal Portbury Docks. The track beyond Pill is either overgrown or built over.

In November 2019 North Somerset Council applied for a Development Consent Order to reopen this line.

The scheme proposes an hourly train service from Portishead, calling at a new station at Pill and then Parson Street, Bedminster and Bristol Temple Meads. The Development Consent Order was authorised in November 2022. The additional funding and the start of construction remains subject to a decision on the project’s Full Business Case in 2024.

== Awards ==
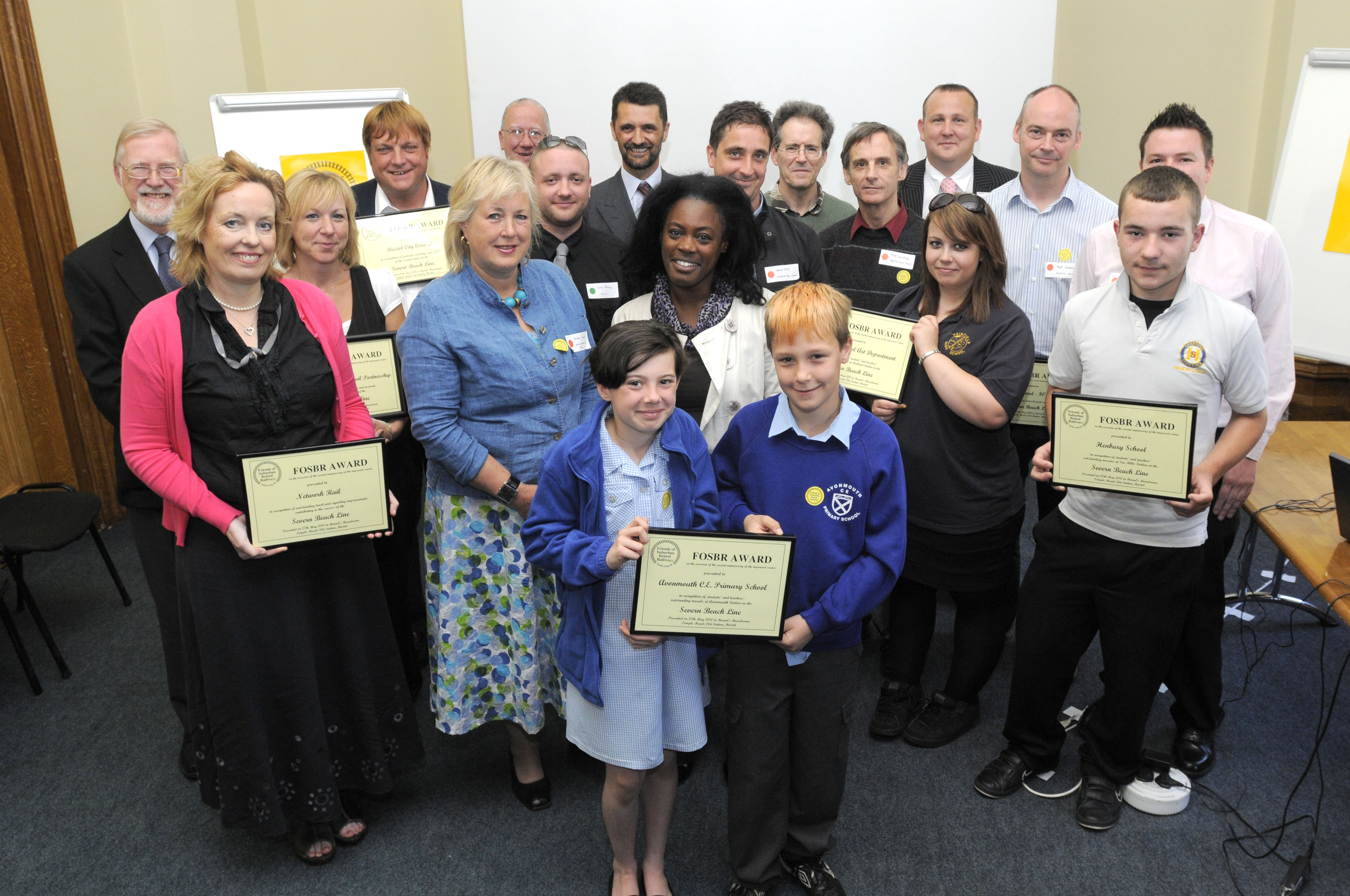
The FoSBR Award winners from 2010.

Bristol Rail Campaign has held awards ceremonies for people and organisations who have helped promote rail transport in the Bristol area.

== See also ==
- Severnside Community Rail Partnership
