= Henbury railway station =

Former railway station in England

Henbury
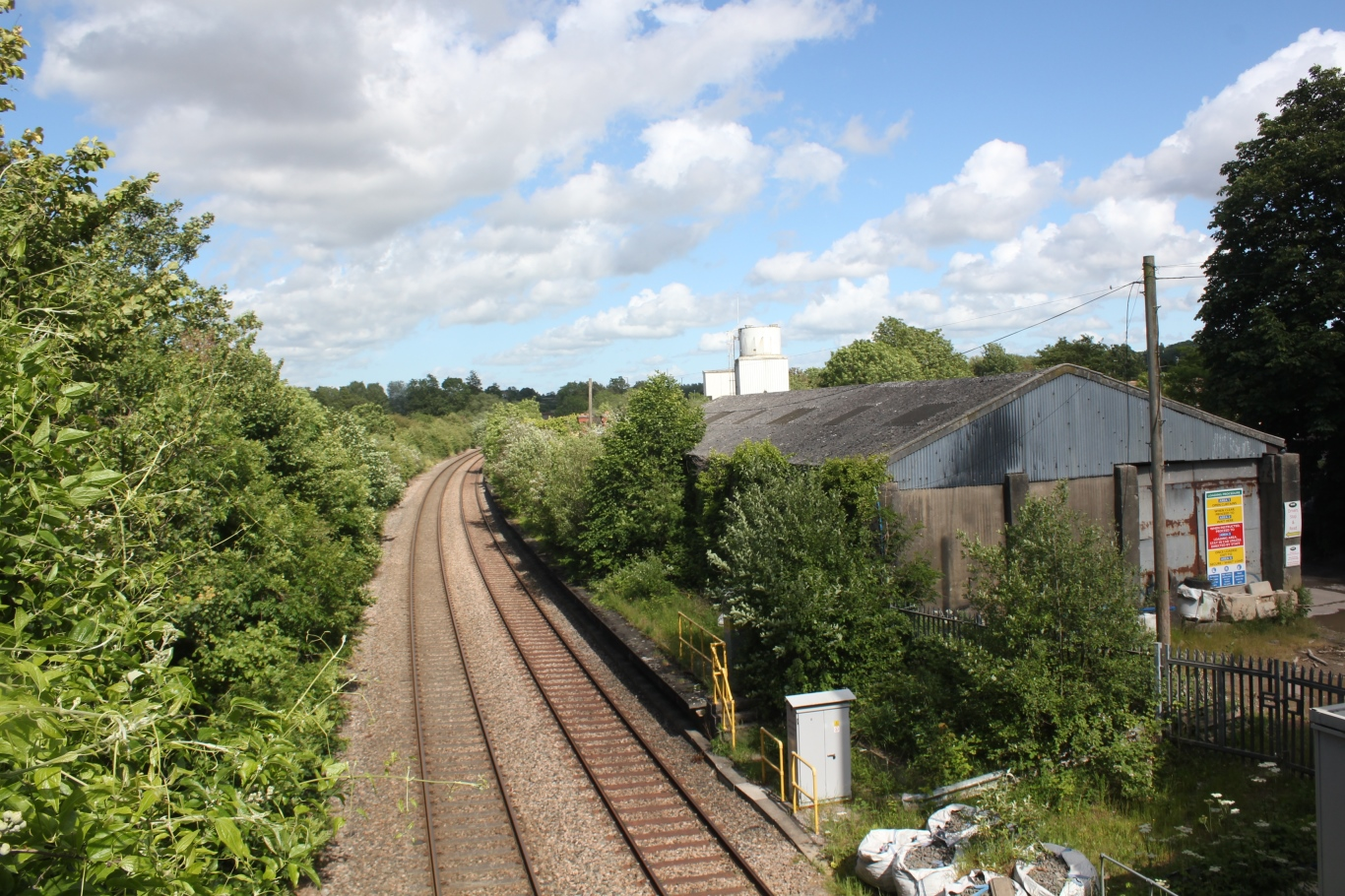
- The remains of the station in 2019

General information
- Location: Henbury, Bristol; England
- Coordinates: 51.5150°N 2.6251°W
- Grid reference: ST567797
- Platforms: 2

Other information
- Status: Disused

History
- Original company: Great Western Railway
- Post-grouping: Great Western Railway; Western Region of British Railways

Key dates
- 9 May 1910: Opened
- 22 March 1915: Closed
- 10 July 1922: Reopened
- 23 November 1964: Closed to passengers
- 5 July 1965: Closed to goods
Location

Henbury railway station served the Bristol suburb of Henbury, England, from 1910 to 1965. The station was situated on the Henbury Loop Line of the Great Western Railway and was opened on 9 May 1910 for passenger services. Under the Beeching cuts, it was closed to passengers on 23 November 1964, with goods services ceasing on 5 July 1965. There is a proposal to reopen the station as part of the Greater Bristol Metro scheme.

== History ==
Opened by the Great Western Railway on 9 May 1910, Henbury station was situated on the Henbury Loop Line which was inaugurated on the same day. The new line formed part of the Great Western's main route to Avonmouth Docks via Stoke Gifford Junction on the South Wales Main Line. Regular passenger services ceased to call at the station between 1915 and 1922, although it appears that unadvertised workmen's services were used by the public to reach the station. In fact, a note in the list of stations issued by the Railway Clearing House in 1921 stated that "Season Ticket and Ordinary Passengers are conveyed". The station was publicly advertised again from 10 July 1922.

Henbury station was listed for closure by the Beeching report and it duly closed to passengers on 23 November 1964, with goods services being withdrawn as from 5 July 1965.

The station's former goods yard was sold at auction in October 2008 by BRB (Residuary) Limited after South Gloucestershire Council had declined to make an offer.

| Preceding station | Historical railways | Following station |
|---|---|---|
| Hallen Halt; Line open, station closed | Great Western Railway; Henbury Loop Line | Charlton Halt; Line open, station closed |

== Future ==
Improved services on the Severn Beach Line are called for as part of the MetroWest scheme, a rail transport plan which aims to enhance transport capacity in the Bristol area. It has been suggested that Henbury railway station be reopened as part of the scheme, with the possibility of services running from Bristol Temple Meads to Bristol Parkway via Clifton Down and Henbury. The Metro scheme was given the go-ahead in July 2012 as part of the City Deal, whereby local councils would be given greater control over money by the government.

In January 2018, it was revealed that the reopened station would be on a new site rather than the former site (referred to as Henbury West) due to high costs. The opening date was pencilled in for May 2021, but has been delayed. The new station will be located close to the A4018 with access by foot, cycle, bus and car. It will link in with the Fishpool Hill development proposed by Persimmon, and will be served by an hourly service between Henbury and Bristol Temple Meads. It will be an unstaffed terminus station with one platform and trains will travel eastbound towards Bristol Temple Meads via Filton Abbey Wood, with new stations at North Filton (now to be Bristol Brabazon) and Ashley Down.

Planning permission for the new station was applied for on 21 August 2023 and granted in October 2025, at which time the station was expected to open in 2028.

| Preceding station | National Rail | Following station |
|---|---|---|
| | Future services | |
| Terminus | Great Western Railway; Henbury Loop Line | Bristol Brabazon; Line open, station under construction. towards Bristol Temple Meads |
