= Charlton Halt railway station (Bristol) =

Railway station in England, 1910–1915

Charlton Halt

General information
- Location: Charlton, South Gloucestershire; England
- Coordinates: 51.5155°N 2.5970°W
- Grid reference: ST586798
- Platforms: 2

Other information
- Status: Disused

History
- Original company: Great Western Railway
- Pre-grouping: Great Western Railway

Key dates
- 9 May 1910: Opened
- 22 March 1915: Station closed
Location

Charlton Halt railway station was a railway station which served the village of Charlton, west of Filton in South Gloucestershire, England, on the Avonmouth and Filton Railway, now known as the Henbury Loop Line. The station was open only between May 1910 and March 1915, when the line was closed to passengers. The line was reopened to passengers from 1922 to 1964, but the station was not reopened.

The village of Charlton lay north of the railway line, and was demolished when Filton Aerodrome was extended in the 1940s.

== Future ==
Improved services on the Severn Beach Line are called for as part of the Greater Bristol Metro scheme, a rail transport plan which aims to enhance transport capacity in the Bristol area. It has been suggested that the Henbury Loop Line be reopened as part of the scheme, with the possibility of services running from Bristol Temple Meads to Bristol Parkway via Clifton Down and Henbury. The Metro scheme was given the go-ahead in July 2012 as part of the City Deal, whereby local councils would be given greater control over money by the government.
