= Hallen Halt railway station =

Former railway station in England

Hallen Halt
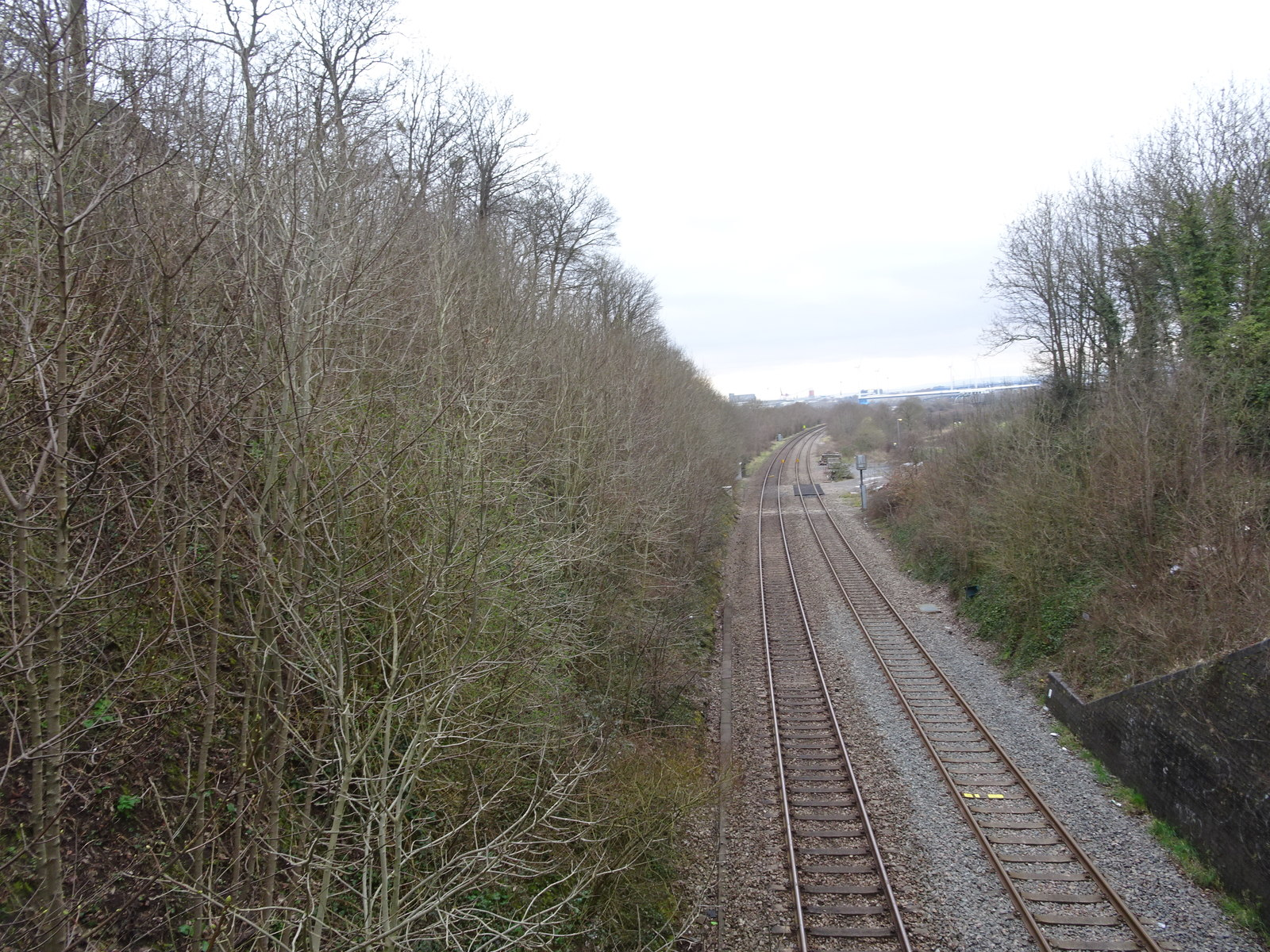

General information
- Location: Hallen, Gloucestershire, South Gloucestershire; England
- Coordinates: 51.5122°N 2.6415°W
- Grid reference: ST555795
- Platforms: 2

Other information
- Status: Disused

History
- Original company: Great Western Railway
- Pre-grouping: Great Western Railway

Key dates
- 9 May 1910: opened
- 22 March 1915: closed
- 10 March 1917: reopened
- October 1918: closed
Location

Hallen Halt railway station was a railway station in Hallen, Gloucestershire, England, on the Henbury Loop Line. The station is closed, and the line is closed to passengers.

== History ==
The halt was opened by the Great Western Railway on 9 May 1910. It was closed on 22 March 1915, but reopened for limited use on 10 March 1917 before being closed permanently in October 1918.

== Future ==
Improved services on the Severn Beach Line are called for as part of the Greater Bristol Metro scheme, a rail transport plan which aims to enhance transport capacity in the Bristol area. It has been suggested that the Henbury Loop Line be reopened as part of the scheme, with the possibility of services running from Bristol Temple Meads to Bristol Parkway via Clifton Down and Henbury. The Metro scheme was given the go-ahead in July 2012 as part of the City Deal, whereby local councils would be given greater control over money by the government.
