= Severn Beach railway station =

Railway station near Bristol, England

Severn Beach
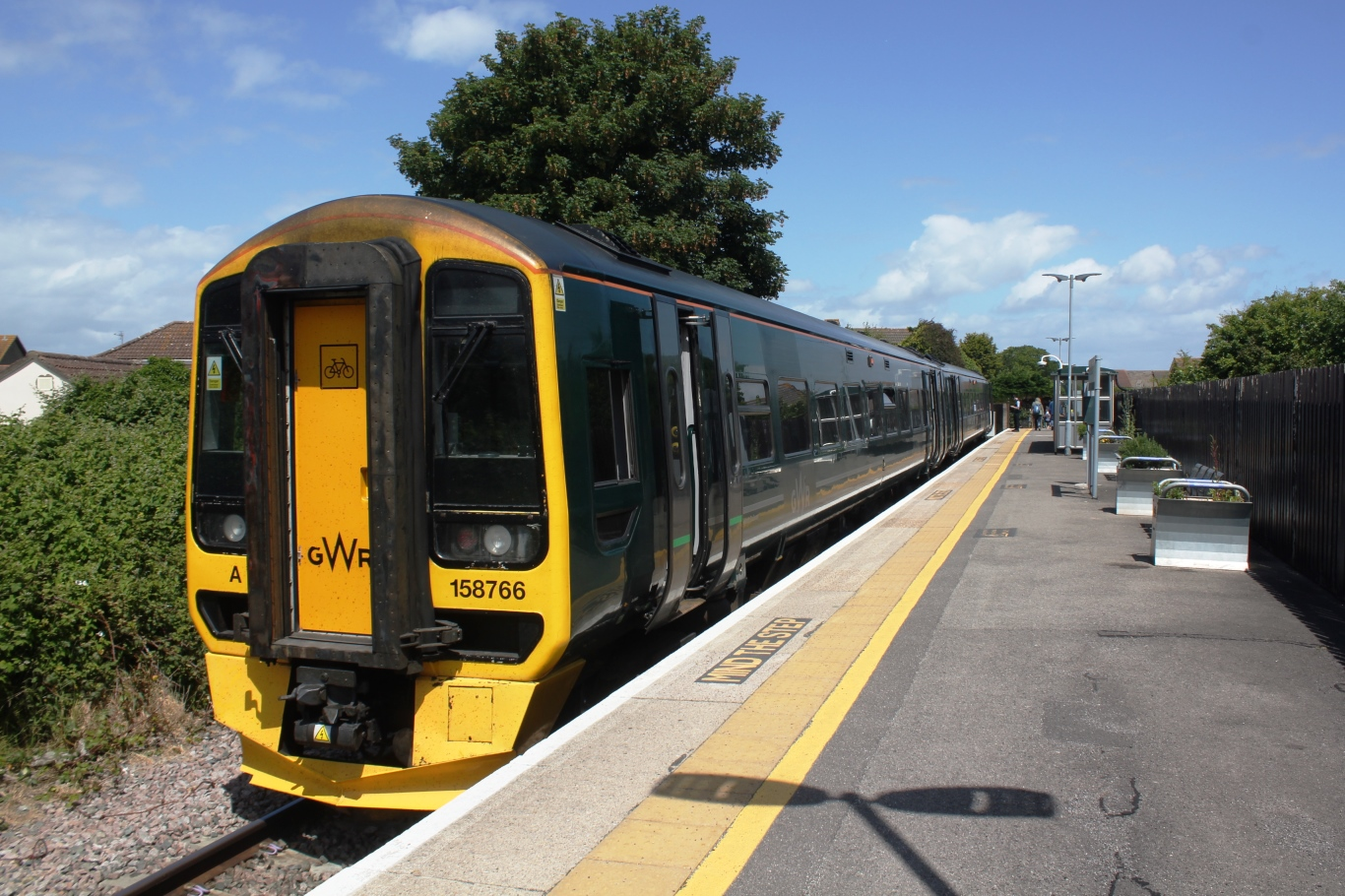

General information
- Location: Severn Beach, South Gloucestershire; England
- Coordinates: 51.5598°N 2.6642°W
- Grid reference: ST540847
- Manager: Great Western Railway
- Platforms: 1

Other information
- Station code: SVB
- Classification: DfT category F1

History
- Original company: Great Western Railway

Key dates
- 5 June 1922: Opened (as excursion platform)
- 26 May 1924: Fully opened
- 9 July 1928: Passenger services extended to Pilning
- 10 September 1963: Closed to goods traffic
- November 1964: Line to Pilning closed to passengers
- July 1968: Line to Pilning closed completely

Passengers
- 2021/22: ▲0.180 million
- 2022/23: ▲0.229 million
- 2023/24: ▲0.253 million
- 2024/25: ▼0.131 million
- 2025/26: ▲0.148 million
Location
Notes
- Passenger statistics from the Office of Rail and Road

Severn Beach railway station serves the village of Severn Beach, England. The station is the terminus of the Severn Beach Line. Its three letter station code is SVB.

This station is 13.5 miles (21.7 km) north west from Bristol Temple Meads on the Severn Beach Line. The station is managed by Great Western Railway, who are also the sole provider of trains serving the station.

== History ==
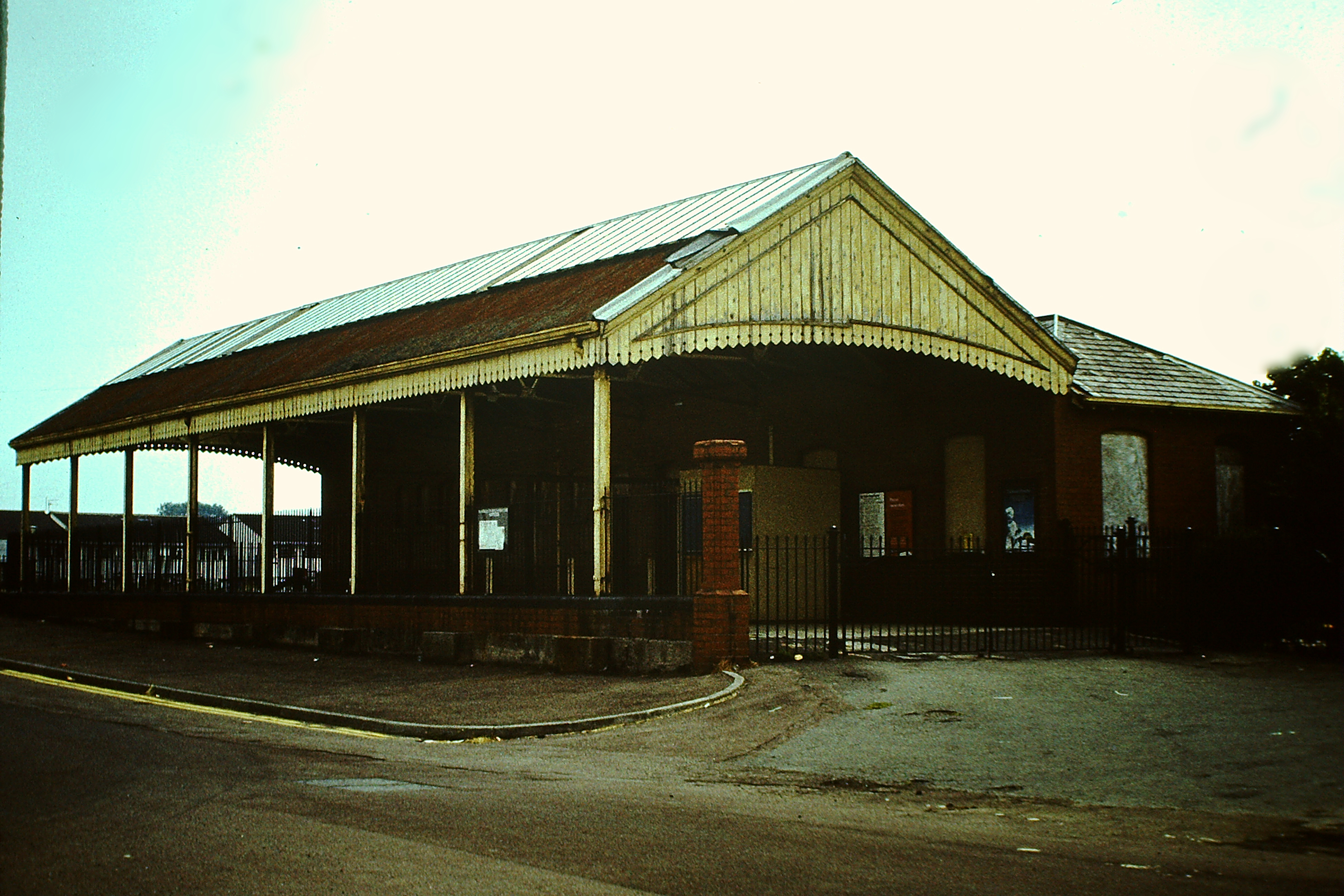
Severn Beach in 1981

The railway reached Severn Beach in 1900, but was at first used only for goods traffic to Pilning. A platform was built beside the line at Severn Beach by the Great Western Railway in 1922, and a bay platform added to the west for excursion traffic, with terminating passenger services from Bristol starting on 26 May 1924, subsequently extended to Pilning in a loop back to Bristol via Patchway from 9 July 1928. By 1924 a brick concourse had been built perpendicular to the bay platform, providing a ticket office, the station master's office, toilets and a ladies' waiting room. The station master and keeper of the level crossing were also provided with houses, while to the east of the platform were sidings, primarily for stabling of excursion trains.

In November 1964 through services to Pilning ceased, with the line north closed completely in July 1968, although goods traffic at Severn Beach had already ended in 1963.

Subsequently, services to Severn Beach were cut back further, with only one in three trains from Bristol to Avonmouth continuing on to Severn Beach and a service frequency of one train every two hours. However, this was improved to hourly in the December 2021 timetable change.

The concourse and other station buildings have been demolished, replaced with a small metal and glass shelter, while the eastern rails have been pulled up, leaving just the bay platform remaining. Half of the 240 yards (220 m) platform is cordoned off, and that which remains dwarfs the diesel multiple units which use it. To the east, the land once used for sidings has become overgrown and a dumping ground for litter and general detritus.

== Service ==
All services at Severn Beach are operated by Great Western Railway mainly using Class 165 and 166 Networker Turbo DMUs and the occasional Class 158 Express Sprinter DMU.

The typical off-peak service is one train per hour to Bristol Temple Meads, with two early morning services on weekdays continuing to Weston-super-Mare, one evening peak service continuing to Salisbury and one Sunday afternoon service continuing to Exeter St Davids. There is also a Saturday evening service which terminates at Frome, and an early morning service which starts at Taunton, as opposed to Bristol Temple Meads. Most services from Bristol Temple Meads terminate at Avonmouth instead of continuing to Severn Beach, whilst those from Weston-super-Mare reach here. However, the return services follow the opposite pattern.

Preceding station	National Rail	Following station
Terminus	Great Western Railway Severn Beach Line	St Andrews Road
	Disused railways	
New Passage Halt	Great Western Railway Severn Beach Line	St Andrews Road

== Future ==
Great Western Railway declined a contractual option to continue the Greater Western passenger franchise (of which services at Severn Beach are a part) beyond 2013, citing a desire for a longer-term contract due to the impending upgrade to the Great Western Main Line. The franchise was put out to tender, but the process was halted and later scrapped due to the fallout from the collapse of the InterCity West Coast franchise competition. A two-year franchise extension until September 2015 was agreed in October 2013, and subsequently extended until March 2019.

With the coming upgrade to the Great Western Main Line, the main line from London to Bristol is due to be electrified by 2016. However, the electrification will not extend beyond the main lines, so Severn Beach will continue to be served by diesel trains. Stephen Williams, MP for Bristol West, questioned whether electrification could continue to Clifton Down. Then-Secretary of State for Transport Philip Hammond replied that it would have to be looked at in the future. The group Friends of Suburban Bristol Railways supports the electrification of the entire Severn Beach Line.

Improved services at Severn Beach are called for as part of the Greater Bristol Metro scheme, a rail transport plan which aims to enhance transport capacity in the Bristol area. There is an aspiration for half-hourly services, however due to the large sections of the Severn Beach Line which are single-track and to the congested main line from Temple Meads, such frequency is not currently feasible. The scheme was given the go-ahead in July 2012 as part of the City Deal, whereby local councils would be given greater control over money by the government.
