= Severn Beach line =

Railway in Bristol and Gloucestershire, England

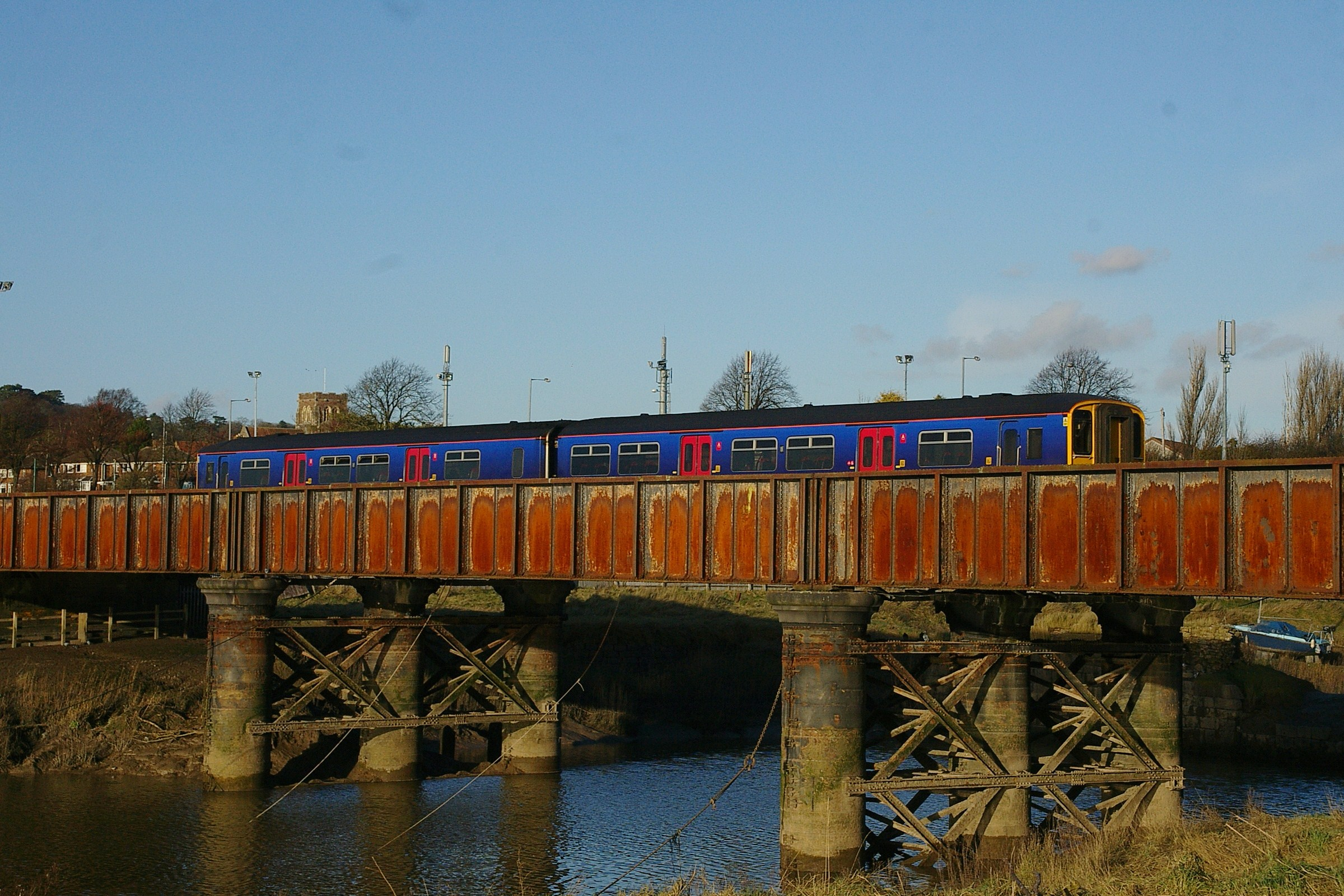
- First Great Western 150233 crosses the River Trym near Sea Mills on its way to Avonmouth.

Overview
- Status: Operational
- Owner: Network Rail
- Locale: Bristol; South Gloucestershire
- Termini: Bristol Temple Meads 51.4492°N 2.5803°W; Severn Beach 51.5599°N 2.6645°W
- Stations: 12

Service
- Type: Commuter rail
- System: National Rail
- Operator: Great Western Railway
- Depot: St Philip's Marsh T&RSMD
- Rolling stock: Class 158 Express Sprinter; Class 165 Turbo; Class 166 Turbo
- Ridership: 1.25 million (2016)

History
- Opened: 1840 (Temple Meads to Bristol West Jn); 1863 (Bristol West Jn to Narroways Hill Jn); 1875 (Narroways Hill Jn to Clifton Down); 1877 (Clifton Down Tunnel); 1900 (Avonmouth to Pilning); 2023 (Portway Park & Ride station)

Technical
- Number of tracks: Part four-track, part double, part single
- Track gauge: 1,435 mm (4 ft 8 1/2 in)
Route map
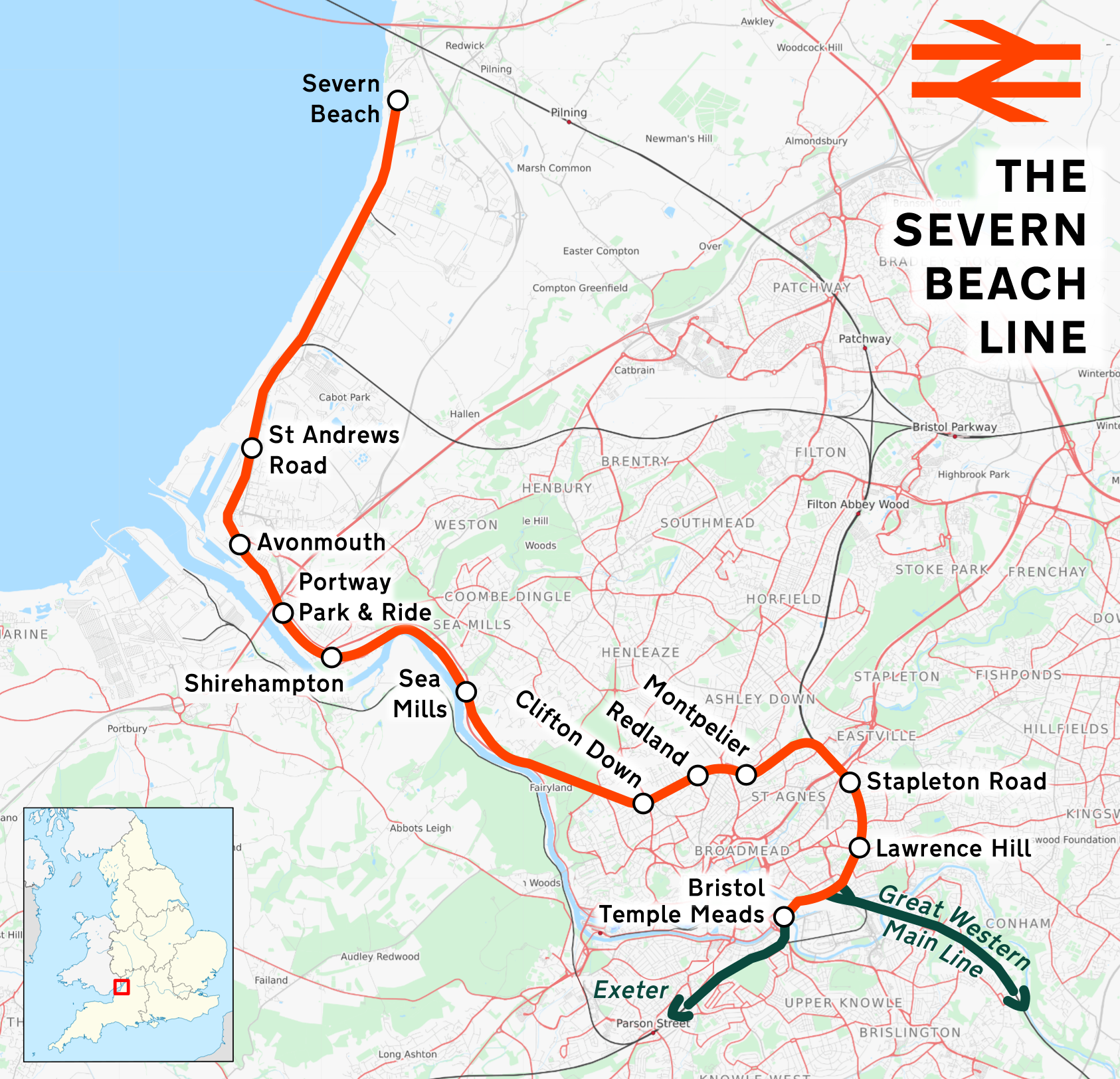
(Click to expand)

The Severn Beach line is a local railway line in Bristol and Gloucestershire, England, which runs from Bristol Temple Meads to Severn Beach, and used to extend to Pilning. The first sections of the line were opened in 1865 as part of the Bristol Port Railway and Pier; the section through Bristol was opened in 1875 as the Clifton Extension Railway.

The line has faced several threats of closure over the years, and has been reduced to single track in many places. In the 21st century it has experienced a surge in passenger numbers, with a 90% increase in the years 2007–2011. All services along the line are operated by Great Western Railway, generally two trains per hour in each direction between Temple Meads and Avonmouth, calling at all stations, with one train per hour extended to Severn Beach. The line carries little freight traffic, with most of the heavy freight traffic to Avonmouth Docks being routed via the Henbury Loop Line through Filton. The line was highlighted by Thomas Cook as one of the scenic lines of Europe.

== Route ==
From Bristol Temple Meads, the line runs east, diverging from the Great Western Main Line, Wessex Main Line and Heart of Wessex Line at Bristol East Junction. The line curves to the north, passing under the A4320 and then joining with a chord from the Great Western Main Line at Dr Day's Junction. At this point there are four tracks, but in the past this narrowed to two before Lawrence Hill. Four tracks were restored as part of the Great Western route improvements. Continuing north, the line passes under the old Midland Railway Bristol to Gloucester Line, passes through Stapleton Road station, then diverges west from the Cross Country Route at Narroways Hill Junction. The line from here is single track, passing through woodland and circling the St Werburghs area, then passing under the B4052 (Ashley Hill) before reaching Montpelier. The line then passes over the A38 Cheltenham Road on a viaduct known as "The Arches", before reaching Redland and continuing along a straight cutting through Cotham before reaching Clifton Down. This is the line's main passing point, as it is one of the few remaining places with double track.

The line then enters the mile-long Clifton Down Tunnel, reappearing in the Avon Gorge. It follows the Avon, passing through Sea Mills before turning inland to Shirehampton and Portway Park & Ride, under the M5 Avonmouth Bridge and through an industrial estate, before reaching Avonmouth. Beyond Avonmouth, the line passes through a small residential area before reaching Avonmouth Docks. A freight yard is to the east of the line here, used for coal trains. St Andrews Road is within the yard, and to the north the Henbury Loop Line diverges to the east. The Severn Beach line continues north along the bank of the River Severn to the terminus at Severn Beach.

Beyond Severn Beach, the line used to continue north through the town and further along the bank of the Severn, meeting the Bristol and South Wales Union Railway's line near New Passage Pier. It then joined with the South Wales Main Line at Pilning.

The line was listed among Thomas Cook's most favoured attractions for its scenic route along the River Avon and River Severn.

== Services ==
Services along the line are operated by Great Western Railway, mainly using diesel Class 166 Turbo units. Until mid-2017, the line had been operated by Class 150 Sprinter units, occasionally supplemented by Class 153 Super Sprinter and Class 158 Express Sprinter units. Until 2012, Class 143 Pacer units were a regular sight, but these were moved south to work in Devon following a cascade of Class 150/1 units from London Midland and London Overground.

Monday to Friday, two trains per hour run from Bristol Temple Meads to Avonmouth, with one extended to St Andrew's Road and Severn Beach, giving a service at Clifton Down of one train approximately every 30 minutes in each direction. Services start alternately from Bristol and Weston-super-Mare. There is a similar level of service on Saturdays. Sunday sees a roughly hourly service to and from Bristol, with all daytime services extended to Severn Beach.

Clifton Down is the line's main passing point, so trains to Avonmouth usually arrive at the same time as trains to Bristol Temple Meads. Most trains call at all stations. The typical journey time from Temple Meads to Avonmouth is 28 minutes, and 37 minutes to Severn Beach.

All stations on the line are in Travel Zone A (Bristol City) apart from Severn Beach which is in Zone C.

== History ==
=== The Bristol Port Railway and Pier ===
Bristol sits on the River Avon, with its docks several miles inland. By the 19th century, ships had grown to such a size that navigating the Avon was not possible any more, and so ships would have to dock at the head of the river at Avonmouth instead. The Bristol Port Railway and Pier company (BPRP) was founded in 1862 with the intent to build a single-track standard gauge railway the 5.75 miles (9.25 km) from Avonmouth to the city centre alongside the Avon. The railway's act of parliament was passed on 17 July 1862, and the railway opened on 6 March 1865, running from a terminus called Clifton in the Avon Gorge.

As built, the railway was isolated from the rest of the national network, having not been intended for anything more than local traffic, so a connection to the main line railways was needed in order to develop Avonmouth as a port. However, due to the position of Clifton station and the large amount of developed land in the Hotwells area, an extension towards Bristol Temple Meads, the city's main station, would have been prohibitively expensive. Instead, a link was proposed from the BPRP at Sneyd Park, running under Clifton Down and through the suburbs to connect to the main lines of the Midland and Bristol and South Wales Union railways. The connection was authorised in 1867, but the BPRP was in financial difficulties, and so unable to complete the line. It entered into negotiations with the Midland and Great Western Railways (the latter now the owner of the Bristol and South Wales Union Railway).

=== Clifton Extension Railway ===
The Clifton Extension Railway initially ran from Clifton Down to Narroways Hill Junction with what is now the Cross Country Route north through Bristol, then part of the Great Western Railway; and over a viaduct from Narroways Hill to the Midland Railway's Bristol to Gloucester line near Fishponds. The line was managed by the Clifton Extension Railway Joint Committee, but in 1894 responsibility was passed to the Great Western & Midland Railways Joint Committee. Services began to Clifton Down on 1 October 1874.

The initial service provided by the Midland Railway was between Clifton Down, Fishponds and Mangotsfield, where passengers could change for services to Bath, Birmingham and other Midland destinations. The Great Western provided services from Clifton Down to Bristol Temple Meads, the city's major station, where passengers could change for trains to London, Exeter and Wales, among others. The Great Western also provided occasional through services to Weston-super-Mare. There were a total of 23 trains in each direction between the two companies Monday-Saturday. On Sundays, there was no Midland service, but seven Great Western trains. The fare to Temple Meads was 6d first-class and 3d third-class.

The Clifton Down Tunnel, the final link to the Bristol Port Railway and Pier, was opened in 1877, initially allowing freight trains to reach Avonmouth Docks. It was not until 1885 that it was cleared for passenger use, which allowed services to Avonmouth via Sea Mills and Shirehampton. There was a trial Midland service between Bristol St Philip's and Avonmouth in September 1885, but this was ended after a month. In 1886, the daily Great Western service was six trains each way between Avonmouth and Temple Meads, 24 trains from Clifton Down to Temple Meads and 26 the other direction. The Midland provided 12 services from Clifton Down to Fishponds, and 11 back.

There was not initially a station at Redland, but there was local support, with several petitions submitted to the line's Joint Railway Committee. The first was received in October 1885, but was rejected due to the estimated cost of £3,410 to provide the station. A second petition was rejected eighteen months later. The Bristol Chamber of Commerce petitioned for a station in 1892, but the Committee again rejected the request, stating that estimated traffic levels would not justify the expense. It took until 1896 until a revised plan was accepted by the committee. The station finally opened on 12 April 1897.

In 1910, Clifton Down saw 17 Great Western services from Avonmouth to Temple Meads and 15 the other way, a further 20 trains each day operating between Clifton and Temple Meads, and 13 Midland trains each way between Clifton and Fishponds or Mangotsfield. Midland services were suspended from 1 January 1917 to 15 May 1919 due to the First World War. The Hotwells section of the Bristol Port Railway and Pier closed in 1922, so to compensate, an additional six trains were provided from Clifton Down to Avonmouth, and four back.

In 1923, grouping resulted in the Midland Railway being absorbed into the London, Midland and Scottish Railway (LMS), and the line continued in a joint arrangement between the Great Western and the LMS. From 1924, many trains to Avonmouth were extended to Severn Beach, a growing seaside resort, and some on to Pilning, then back to Temple Meads via Patchway. The Second World War saw the end of services to Fishponds and Mangotsfield, the last operating on 31 March 1941. By 1947, just before the start of the British Rail era, there were 33 services each direction between Avonmouth and Temple Meads, and 18 on Sundays. Some trains made circular trips to and from Temple Meads via Clifton Down and Henbury or Pilning.

=== British Rail ===
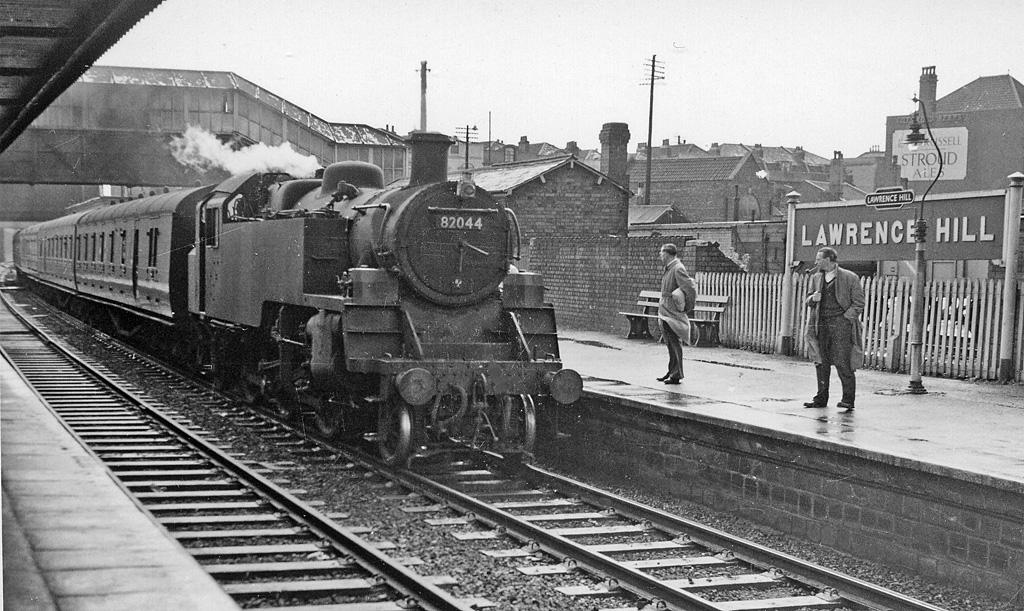
Temple Meads to Severn Beach train in 1958 headed by a BR Standard tank steam locomotive

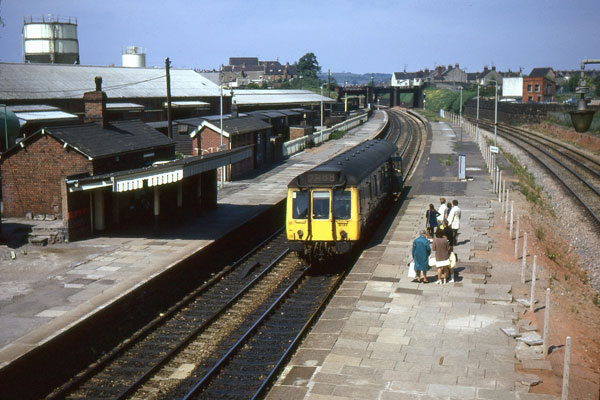
A railcar operating a Severn Beach line service at Lawrence Hill in the 1970s

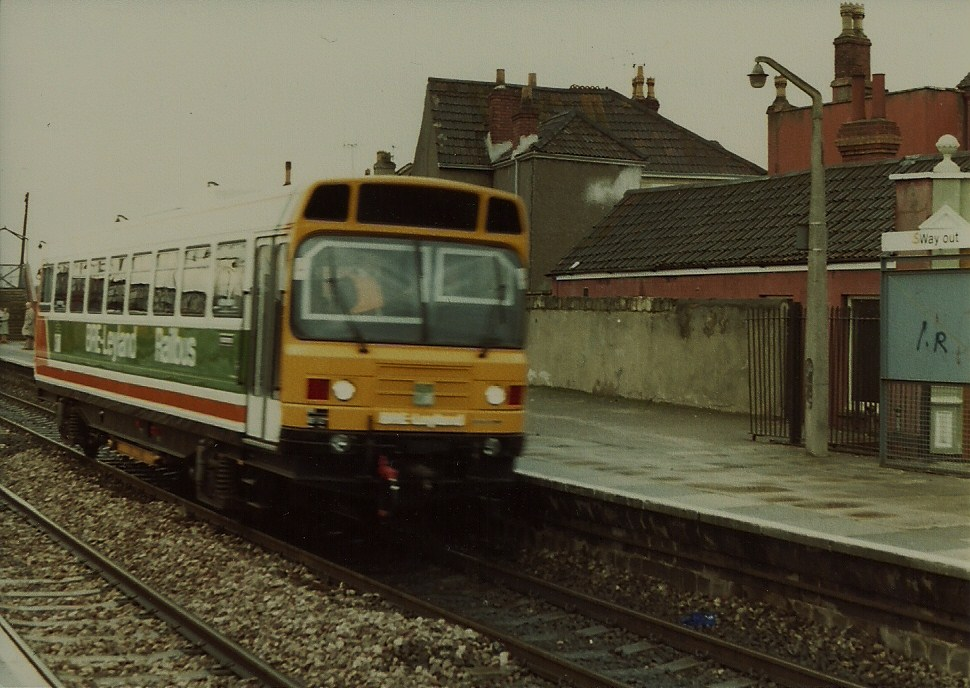
British Rail Engineering Limited concept railbus LEV3 on an evaluation run at Stapleton Road in 1981

When the railways were nationalised in 1948, the Severn Beach line came under the aegis of the Western Region of British Railways. Passenger numbers however dropped sharply in 1961 as the result of a fare increase, and so in 1962 a new reduced timetable was enacted, which lost more passengers, and saw the withdrawal of a special schoolchildren's service. A year later in 1963, the Beeching report suggested that all services along the line be withdrawn. Following meetings with staff, it was decided to keep the line open to Severn Beach, but to close the section to Pilning, and also end services via Henbury. These services duly ended, but the line was still threatened, and on 10 February 1967 it was announced that all services between Stapleton Road and Severn Beach would be discontinued. An enquiry followed, and in June that year the decision was reversed, on the condition that tickets be issued on the trains. Thus, on 17 July 1967, all stations along the line, other than Temple Meads, had their staff withdrawn. The decrease of costs allowed a reduction of ticket prices, but the line was still under threat until in June 1969 it was decided that the line's closure would result in significant hardship, and so a grant was allocated to ensure continued services. Most of the line was reduced to single track in late 1970, leaving Clifton Down as one of the few passing places.

In 1971 the weekday service was 20 trains in each direction, 19 calling at all stations between Bristol Temple Meads and Severn Beach and 1 train that terminated at St Andrews Road.

On 20 October 1981, the Severn Beach line saw one of the first uses of a railbus on passenger services, when British Rail Engineering Limited Railbus RB003 operated the 10:08 service from Bristol Temple Meads. The first railbus concept, LEV1, would begin operations on the line less than a week later. Later model Class 143 Pacer railbuses would be a regular sight on the line until 2012.

British Rail was split into business-led sectors in the 1980s, at which time operations passed to Regional Railways. At this time, all trains ran to Severn Beach, but the service pattern was irregular. The state of the line was brought up in Parliament in 1990 by MP for Bristol North West Michael Stern, who asked why British Rail was not willing to publicise the line and protect the frequency of services. Cecil Parkinson MP, then-Secretary of State for Transport, replied that the line was using "out-of-date, worn-out rolling stock" due to late deliveries from manufacturers, and that British Rail would not encourage people to use it until there was a better service. In 1995, an hourly timetable was introduced for peak times, but services terminated at Avonmouth so that a single Sprinter unit could work the service. There was a better service on Saturdays as more rolling stock was available, but there was no Sunday service. Talk arose again of the line being closed completely. Local tourism expert Bernard Lane described the line's state as:

... the line the railway wished was not there. It was the line that got bus substitution whenever they were short of trains or queues, when a rugby match in Cardiff needed a special. It has a problem in that the route is slow and not very direct; for years it was invisible, short of marketing and lacking a regular interval timetable.

=== Post-privatisation ===
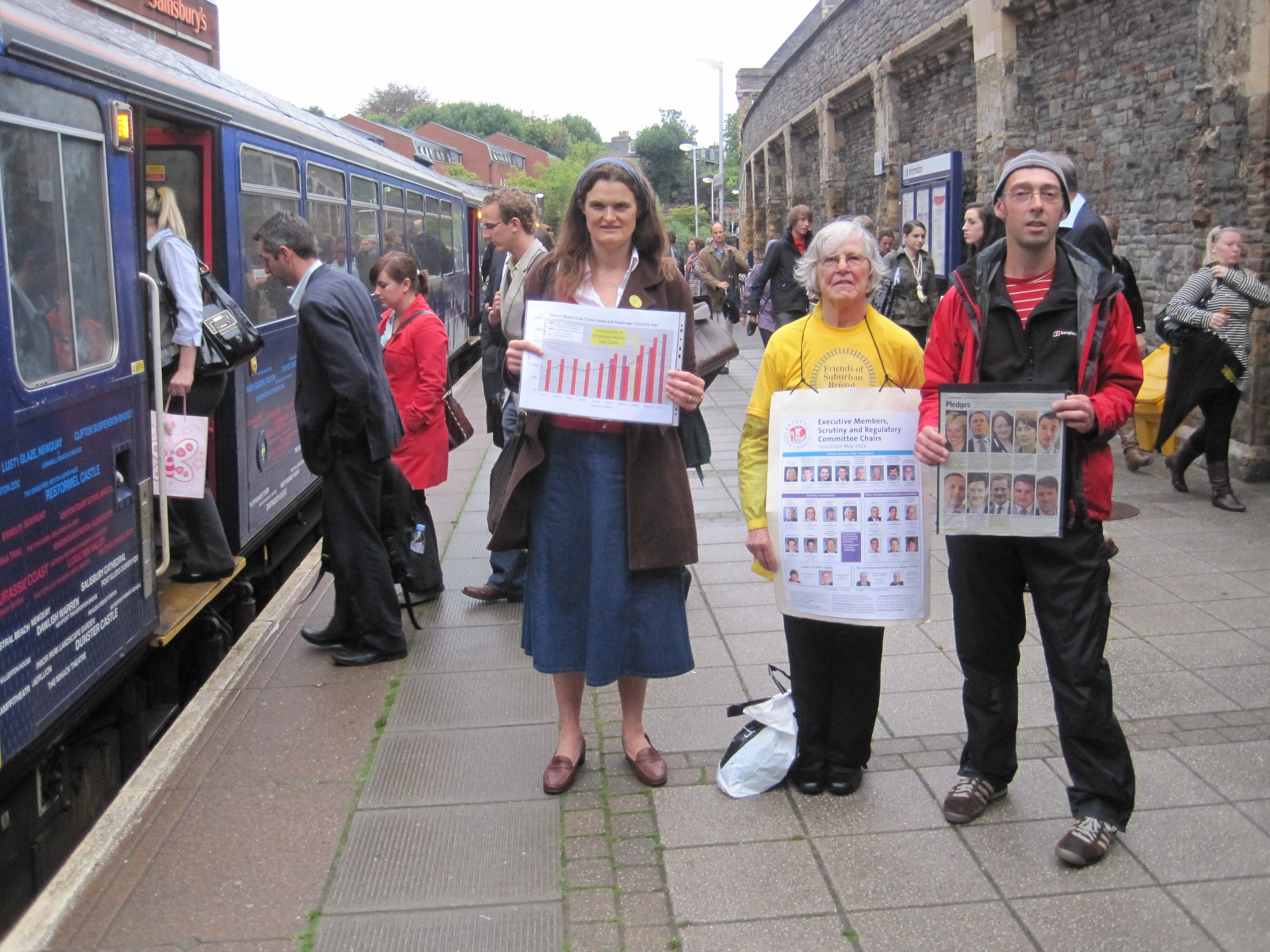
Friends of Suburban Bristol Railways is one of the main campaign groups supporting the line. Here they stage a demonstration in 2010 at Clifton Down, calling for an improved service.

When the railway was privatised in 1997, local services were franchised to Wales & West, which was succeeded by Wessex Trains in 2001.

=== 21st century ===
Following action by Friends of Severn Beach Railway (FOSBR, later renamed Friends of Suburban Bristol Railways) and a string of protests, services had increased to 10 per day in each direction by 2005, with Bristol City Council paying a subsidy of £138,000 per annum to fund services. A new subsidy agreement had been reached in 2003, following a threat that the end of subsidy would see services along the line halved. However, even with the subsidy, the line still suffered to keep the rest of the network running. Mike Holmes, station manager for most of the line's stations, told the Bristol Evening Post that:

Before we put real effort into the Severn Beach line it was really the sacrificial lamb for other services. So if we needed a spare train, we would pull one off the line and cancel it, which was why punctuality and reliability was so poor. After the public campaign in 2006 we decided that we didn't want to take that to carry on any more.

Protesters would chant "The Severn Beach is a mighty fine line; Clean and friendly and sometimes on time."

The Wessex franchise was amalgamated with the Great Western franchise into the Greater Western franchise from 2006, and responsibility passed to First Great Western, rebranded in 2015 as Great Western Railway. A 1-hour minimum service requirement was written into the new franchise agreement. In 2007, the council agreed to subsidise a service of at least one train every 45mins in each direction along the line, unanimously agreeing to pay £450,000 per annum to fund extra services from May 2008 for three years, which resulted in a 60% increase in passenger numbers along the line, and a 25% year-on-year increase between June 2009 and June 2010. Sunday services to Severn Beach were restored in 2010, funded by South Gloucestershire Council. The line was designated a community rail service in 2008, and is one of the lines covered by the Severnside Community Rail Partnership.

The council subsidy was halved in 2011 at the end of the three-year deal, with the council stating that with the large increase in passenger numbers, such a large subsidy was no longer necessary. Local groups, including FOSBR and the Green Party claimed that services became less reliable following the cut, but First Great Western and the council stated that reliability problems were not due to the cut in subsidy, but instead due to breakdowns and track maintenance. The council subsidies, for both increased services and Sunday services, were due to be replaced by national funding in 2015. An additional evening service was agreed in February 2012, to start in September 2012, after protests about a 100-minute gap in the timetable.

First Great Western declined an option to continue the Greater Western franchise beyond 2013, citing a desire for a longer-term contract due to the impending upgrade to the Great Western Main Line. The franchise was put out to tender, but the process was halted and later scrapped due to the fallout from the collapse of the InterCity West Coast franchise competition. A two-year franchise extension until September 2015 was agreed in October 2013, and subsequently extended until March 2019.

With the coming upgrade to the Great Western Main Line, the main line from London to Bristol was due to be electrified by 2016; however, delays and cost overruns led to removal of Temple Meads from the programme. The electrification was not planned to extend beyond the main lines, so the Severn Beach line continues to be served by diesel trains. Stephen Williams, MP for Bristol West, questioned whether electrification could continue to Clifton Down. Secretary of State for Transport Philip Hammond replied that it would have to be looked at in the future. Friends of Suburban Bristol Railways (FOSBR) supports the electrification of the entire Severn Beach line.

Improved services along the line are called for as part of the Greater Bristol Metro scheme, a rail transport plan which aims to enhance transport capacity in the Bristol area. There is an aspiration for half-hourly services, however due to the large sections of single-track and the congested main line from Temple Meads, such frequency is not currently feasible. However, it is expected that with the four-tracking of Filton Bank, including the Severn Beach line between Temple Meads and Narroways Hill Junction, that there will be sufficient capacity to allow half-hourly services. The Invitation to Tender for the Greater Western franchise asked bidders to include costs for two trains per hour each direction on the Severn Beach line, one between Severn Beach and Portishead, the other between Severn Beach and Bath Spa, both calling at all stations. These services are to run from December 2017, operating 18 hours a day Monday-Saturday and 9 hours a day on Sundays.

The metro plan also calls for the reopening of the Henbury Loop Line, which could allow a service from Temple Meads to Bristol Parkway via the Severn Beach line. The metro scheme was given the go-ahead in July 2012 as part of the City Deal, whereby local councils would be given greater control over money by the government, but it is as yet unclear which elements will be implemented. FOSBR and other local groups lodged concerns with the Department for Transport that the reopening of the Henbury Loop was not included in the ITT for the new Greater Western franchise. A one-off service, operated by First Great Western, ran on the line on 27 July 2013.

The Portway Park and Ride railway station was opened in August 2023 between Shirehampton and Avonmouth to serve the A4 Portway Park & Ride scheme. The new station plan was included in the Bristol Metro proposal, and for some years the project had the support of the FOSBR and the Bristol branch of the National Union of Rail, Maritime and Transport Workers.

== Passenger volume ==
Below are the passenger usage statistics from years starting April 2002 to April 2025. Comparing 2002 with later years shows a significant increase in usage of all stations. The most recent figures have been attributed to an improved service. Clifton Down has persisted as the most popular station on the line, serving the popular Whiteladies Road and Cotham Hill, and having served Bristol Zoo until its closure in 2022.

Comparing over a full decade from April 2012 to April 2002, on the main line, Lawrence Hill and Stapleton Road have increased 130% and 82% respectively. On the branch line, the stations with the biggest changes were Severn Beach, St Andrews Road and Clifton Down with 363%, 228% and 178% respectively. The lowest increase was at Shirehampton with only 35%. Montpelier, Redland, Sea Mills and Avonmouth have increased by 103%, 89%, 68% and 144% respectively.

Station usage
Station name	2002–03	2004–05	2005–06	2006–07	2007–08	2008–09	2009–10	2010–11	2011–12	2012–13	2013–14	2014–15	2015–16	2016–17	2017–18	2018–19	2019–20	2020–21	2021–22	2022–23	2023–24	2024–25
Lawrence Hill	54,180	46,508	55,865	68,371	55,730	67,338	74,876	93,600	102,960	124,878	136,316	150,774	157,912	170,084	151,625	148,606	190,118	66,852	152,906	209,022	287,182	339,856
Stapleton Road	77,201	73,202	86,997	98,446	72,182	103,576	111,532	123,084	129,356	140,390	157,294	178,114	179,872	183,780	179,780	168,674	205,224	65,722	147,770	211,718	273,772	305,052
Montpelier	62,005	65,108	73,573	76,969	60,629	84,834	96,114	111,628	122,222	126,316	121,294	130,560	122,146	111,540	102,004	94,684	129,556	42,438	91,758	169,540	231,630	252,028
Redland	50,293	50,063	55,529	66,852	61,394	86,234	86,426	92,966	96,904	94,984	93,176	105,610	99,732	94,454	88,876	88,338	120,642	33,332	83,576	158,136	210,946	230,370
Clifton Down	187,558	141,838	153,027	180,656	204,397	281,876	361,828	433,088	471,010	522,010	573,770	619,766	672,386	764,192	692,122	628,888	727,774	168,394	400,730	608,640	771,552	817,690
Sea Mills	34,649	34,113	36,411	40,786	33,222	36,358	41,680	49,082	51,998	58,310	58,106	64,512	61,696	62,162	54,484	52,630	58,204	13,108	36,408	62,422	78,810	81,946
Shirehampton	37,563	29,645	31,539	38,493	30,893	34,292	35,758	42,566	43,482	50,654	51,542	52,480	56,756	55,762	48,700	47,234	55,518	17,454	42,264	67,124	70,000	63,976
Portway Park and Ride	not opened	not opened	not opened	not opened	not opened	not opened	not opened	not opened	not opened	not opened	not opened	not opened	not opened	not opened	not opened	not opened	not opened	not opened	not opened	not opened	30,168	59,376
Avonmouth	40,089	33,815	43,365	47,834	44,468	61,948	68,448	83,674	88,642	97,880	111,440	119,924	129,860	144,110	123,932	107,752	127,142	46,076	88,332	109,936	134,538	171,440
St Andrews Road	3,021	4,969	8,008	5,518	3,183	3,582	3,942	4,328	6,072	9,910	13,376	11,184	7,374	6,522	5,516	4,724	5,728	4,910	7,164	17,322	34,554	81,974
Severn Beach	36,074	29,295	37,088	38,202	54,034	74,712	88,504	113,480	141,714	167,078	195,824	224,658	260,784	310,818	292,044	251,994	301,154	98,726	180,444	228,566	252,964	131,212
The annual passenger usage is based on sales of tickets in stated financial years from Office of Rail and Road estimates of station usage. The statistics are for passengers arriving and departing from each station and cover twelve-month periods that start in April. Methodology may vary year on year. Usage since the period 2019–20 have been affected by the COVID-19 pandemic, especially the period 2020–23.

Whilst not based on the same methodology, the Severnside Community Rail Partnership carry out a passenger count on a particular day every June and the 2014 count had an increase in passenger usage of 16% over the 2013 count, indicating that the high growth on this line seen in previous years continues.

== See also ==
- Rail transport in Bristol
