= Henbury Loop Line =

Railway line in England

Henbury Loop
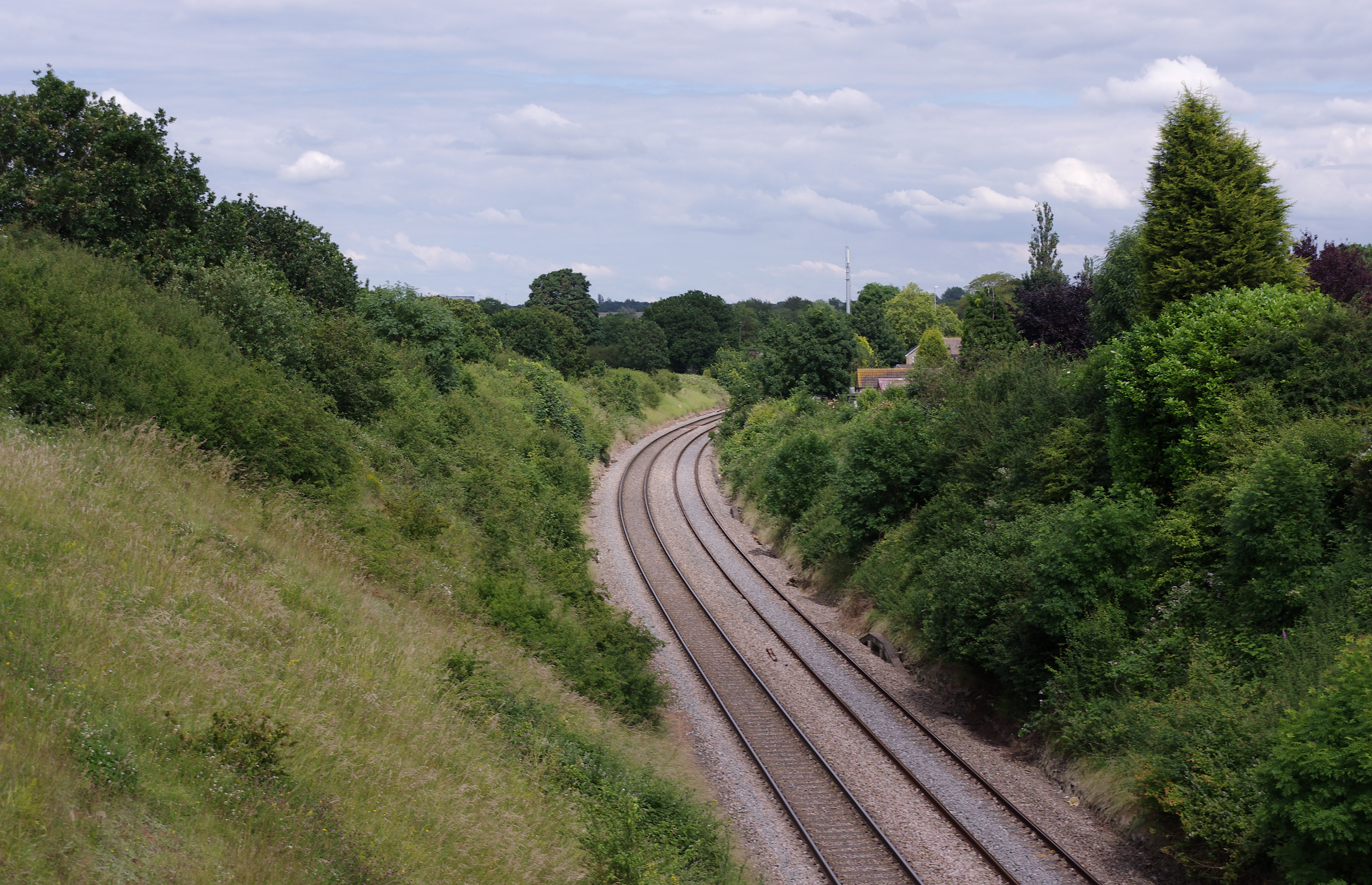
- The line at Henbury

Overview
- Status: Operational (freight only)
- Owner: Network Rail
- Locale: Bristol; South Gloucestershire
- Termini: Filton; Avonmouth
- Stations: 5 (0 in use)

Service
- Type: Heavy rail
- System: National Rail

Technical
- Line length: 6 miles 39 chains (10.4 km)
- Track gauge: 1,435 mm (4 ft 8 1/2 in) standard gauge
Route map
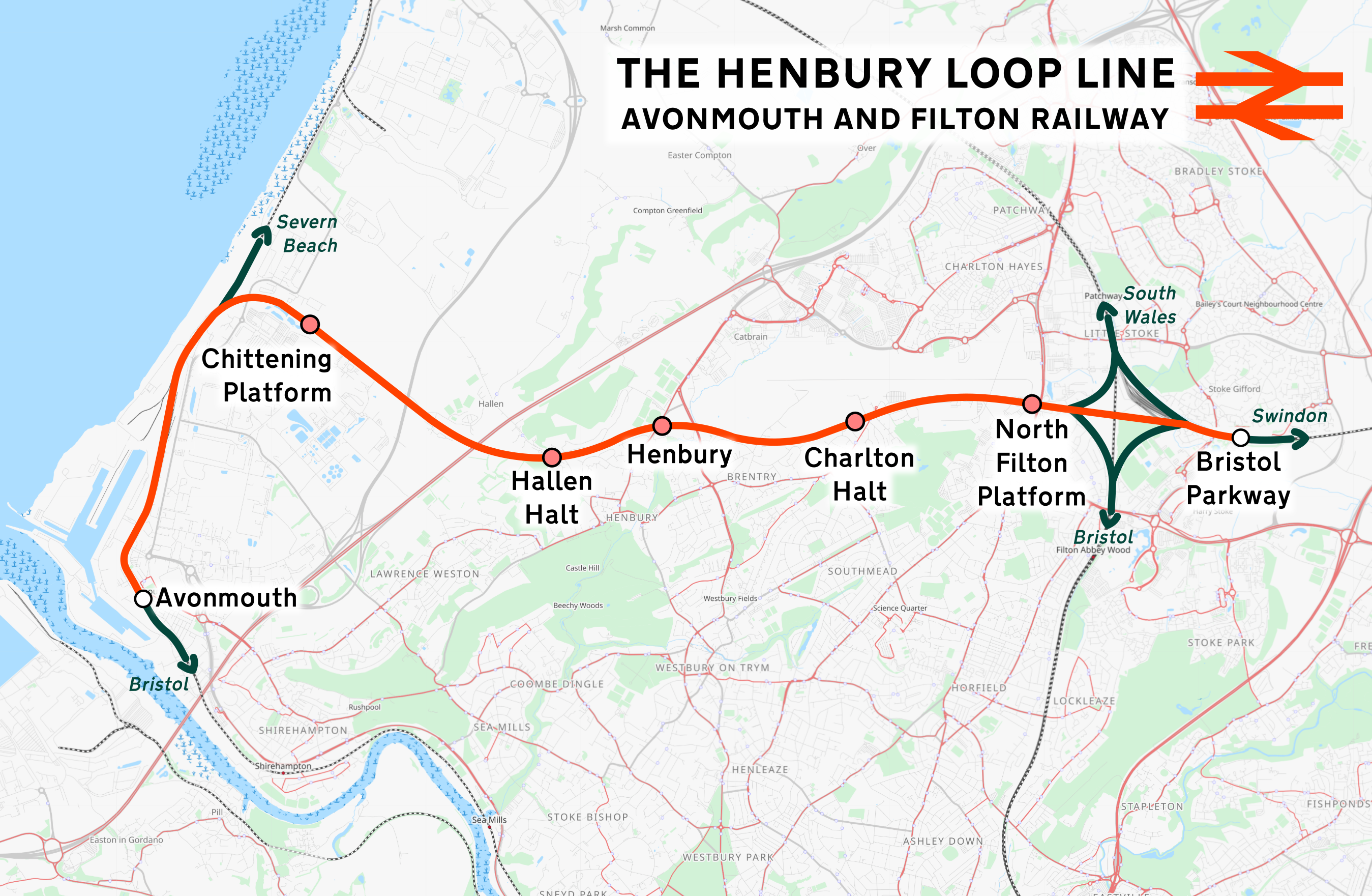
(Click to expand)

The Henbury Loop Line, also known as the Filton to Avonmouth Line, is a railway line following the boundary between Bristol and South Gloucestershire between the Severn Beach Line at Hallen Marsh Junction, Avonmouth and the Cross Country Route/South Wales Main Line at Filton. It is currently only used for freight, but passenger services on parts of the line are planned to be restored as part of MetroWest (Bristol).

== History ==
The line was opened on 9 May 1910, as a more direct route to Avonmouth docks, and was initially known as the Avonmouth and Filton Railway. Although the line was mainly intended for freight services, passenger services were also provided until 1915, with stations at Filton Halt, Charlton, Henbury and Hallen. In 1917, a small station was opened at Chittening Platform to serve a new factory. The line was fully reopened to passenger traffic in 1922. Filton Halt, Charlton and Hallen stations did not reopen, but in 1926 a new station, North Filton Platform, was opened on the site of Filton Halt. The line closed to passenger traffic on September 5, 1986.

In 1971 a curve was opened to link the line to the South Wales Main Line at Patchway. This was to facilitate traffic to and from South Wales, including zoo excursions to Clifton Down.

== Reopening ==
Friends of Suburban Bristol Railways (FOSBR) and other local rail campaign groups support the reopening of the line to passengers, as well as the stations at North Filton and Henbury. FOSBR suggest this would help services along the Severn Beach Line, allowing a Bristol Temple Meads-Avonmouth-Bristol Parkway service, and also provide services to the north of Bristol generally, the Cribbs Causeway shopping centre, and the redevelopment at Filton Aerodrome. South Gloucestershire Council planning committee recommended in 2011 that the line be re-opened for passenger services.

A consultation document produced for the West of England Partnership by the Halcrow Group suggested passenger services use the line as a spur. Campaigners objected that the suggested services would not call at stations such as Stapleton Road and Lawrence Hill.

A one-off service, operated by First Great Western, ran on the line on 27 July 2013. The train operator hoped to use the service to demonstrate the feasibility of running services over the line, and to make the case for suitable funding. and depends in part upon the four-tracking of Filton Bank to allow more trains to operate the line from Bristol Temple Meads to Filton Abbey Wood. Work on restoring four-track use on Filton Bank was completed in late 2018.

In October 2022 the opening of a new station, North Filton, on the line was pushed back to 2026. On 6 November 2026, it was announced Bristol Brabazon station would be opening on 23 November.

In March 2023 construction work began on Ashley Down station, which, along with Filton Abbey Wood and new stations at North Filton and Henbury, will serve a planned new route along part of the Henbury Loop Line. The new Ashley Down station opened to passenger traffic on 28 September 2024.

This line has been identified by Campaign for a Better Transport as a Priority 1 candidate for reopening and plans are in place to reintroduce passenger services from Bristol to Henbury as part of MetroWest.
