= Shirehampton railway station =

Railway station in Bristol, England

Shirehampton
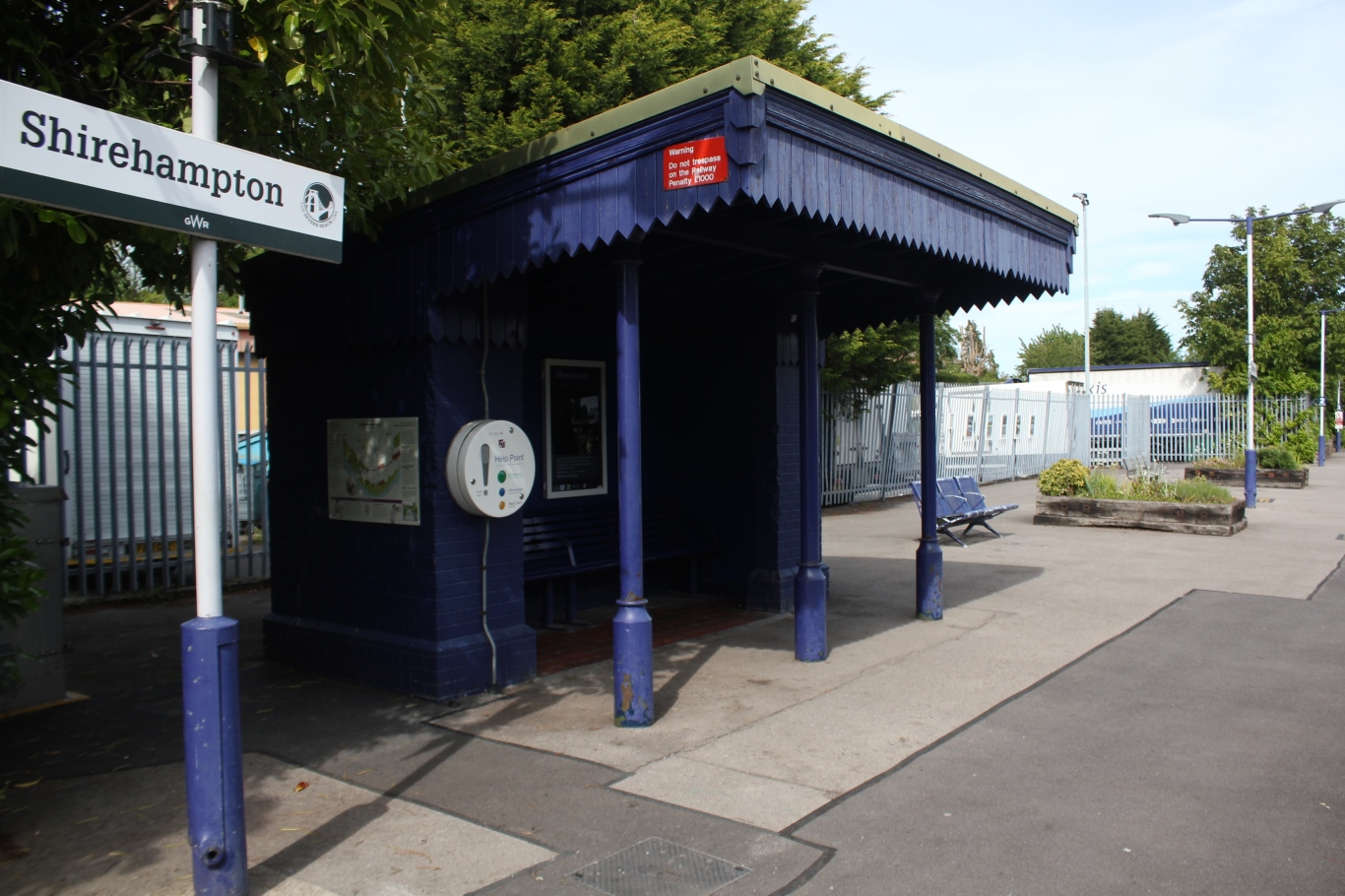
- Station shelter and platform in 2019

General information
- Location: Shirehampton, Bristol; England
- Coordinates: 51.4844°N 2.6792°W
- Grid reference: ST529763
- Manager: Great Western Railway
- Platforms: 1

Other information
- Station code: SHH
- Classification: DfT category F2

History
- Original company: Bristol Port Railway and Pier
- Pre-grouping: Great Western Railway
- Post-grouping: Great Western Railway

Key dates
- 6 March 1865: Opened
- 1903: Track doubled and station remodelled
- 29 November 1965: Closed to goods traffic
- October 1970: Track singled
- 1990s: Buildings destroyed by fire

Passengers
- 2021/22: ▲42,264
- 2022/23: ▲67,124
- 2023/24: ▲70,000
- 2024/25: ▼63,976
- 2025/26: ▲73,340
Location
Notes
- Passenger statistics from the Office of Rail and Road

Shirehampton railway station is on the Severn Beach Line and serves the district of Shirehampton in Bristol, England. It is 7.6 miles (12.2 km) from Bristol Temple Meads. Its three letter station code is SHH. The station has a single platform which serves trains in both directions. As of 2015 it is managed by Great Western Railway, which is the third franchise to be responsible for the station since privatisation in 1997. They provide all train services at the station, mainly a train every 30 minutes in each direction.

The station was opened in 1865 as the headquarters of the Bristol Port Railway and Pier, a railway which ran along the River Avon from Hotwells to a pier at Avonmouth, and was linked to the national network in 1877. The station had a single platform to begin with, but was rebuilt with a second in 1903, as well as a signal box and a goods yard. By the 1930s the station had ten staff.

The Severn Beach Line declined over the latter half of the twentieth century, with passenger numbers falling significantly. Goods services at Shirehampton ended in 1965, and all staff were withdrawn in 1967. The second platform and signal box were taken out of use in 1970, with the station buildings sold off and later destroyed by fire. Services had decreased to ten per day each direction by 2005, but have since increased to a train every 30 minutes in each direction.

== Description ==
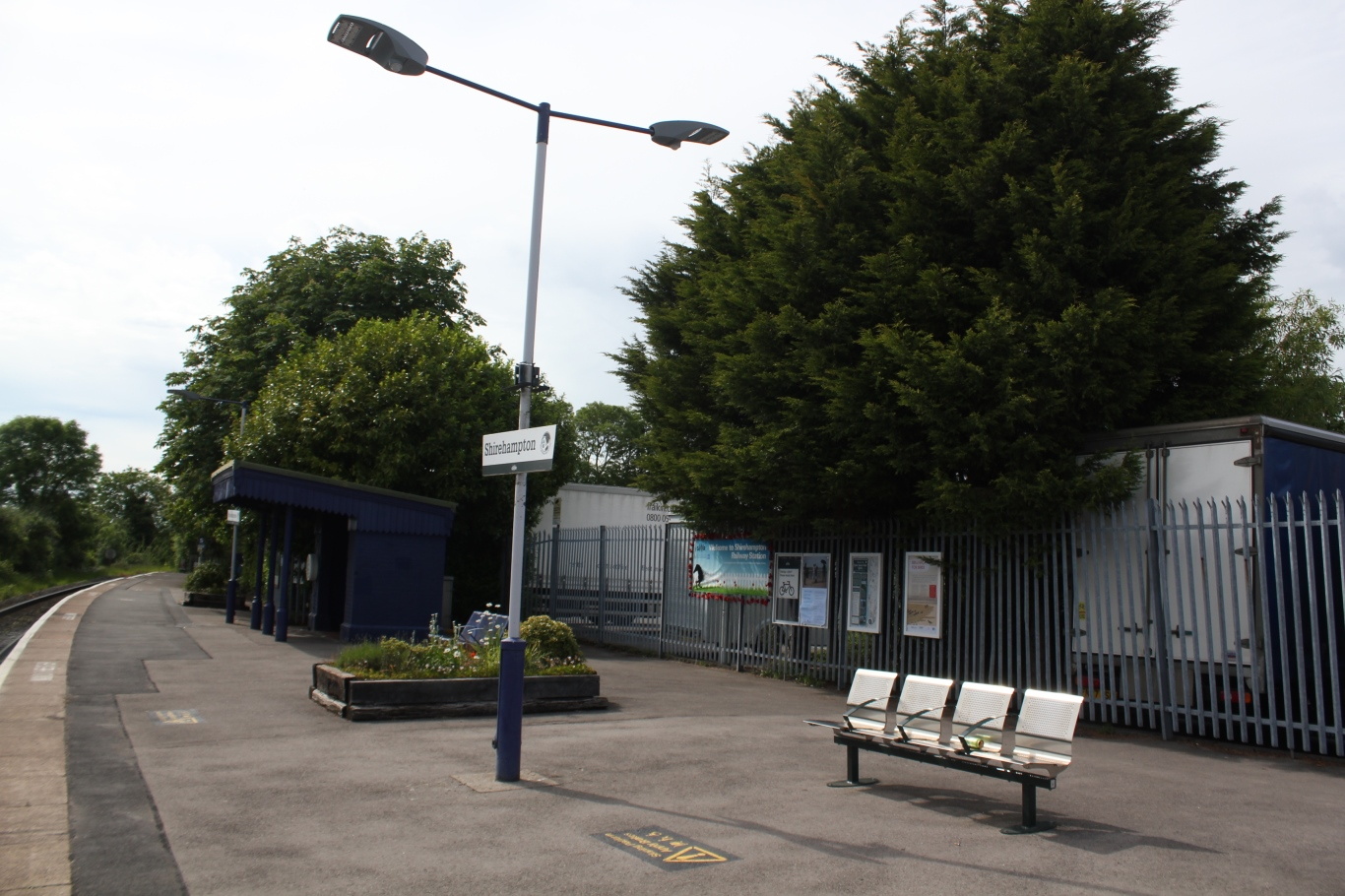
The platform at Shirehampton, looking westbound towards Avonmouth

The station is located in the Shirehampton district of Bristol, a primarily residential area on the north bank of the River Avon near the Severn Estuary. The A4 Bristol Portway is just to the north of the station, with a commercial vehicle hire depot in between. The railway crosses Station Road directly to the west of the station, and is bridged by Hung Road slightly to the east. The station is on the Severn Beach Line from Bristol Temple Meads to Severn Beach, 7 miles 50 chains (12.3 km) from Temple Meads and 5 miles 73 chains (9.5 km) from Severn Beach. (Note: Railways in the United Kingdom are, for historical reasons, measured in miles and chains. There are 80 chains to the mile.) It is the seventh station from Temple Meads. The next station towards Temple Meads is Sea Mills. The next station towards Severn Beach is Portway Park and Ride, which opened in August 2023.

The station is on an east–west alignment, curving towards the north. There is a single 140-yard (130 m)-long platform which serves trains in both directions, situated on the north side of the track. The station's southern platform was abandoned in 1970 and is overgrown. The station is only accessible via a footpath from the car park on Station Road, which is just off the A4 Portway.

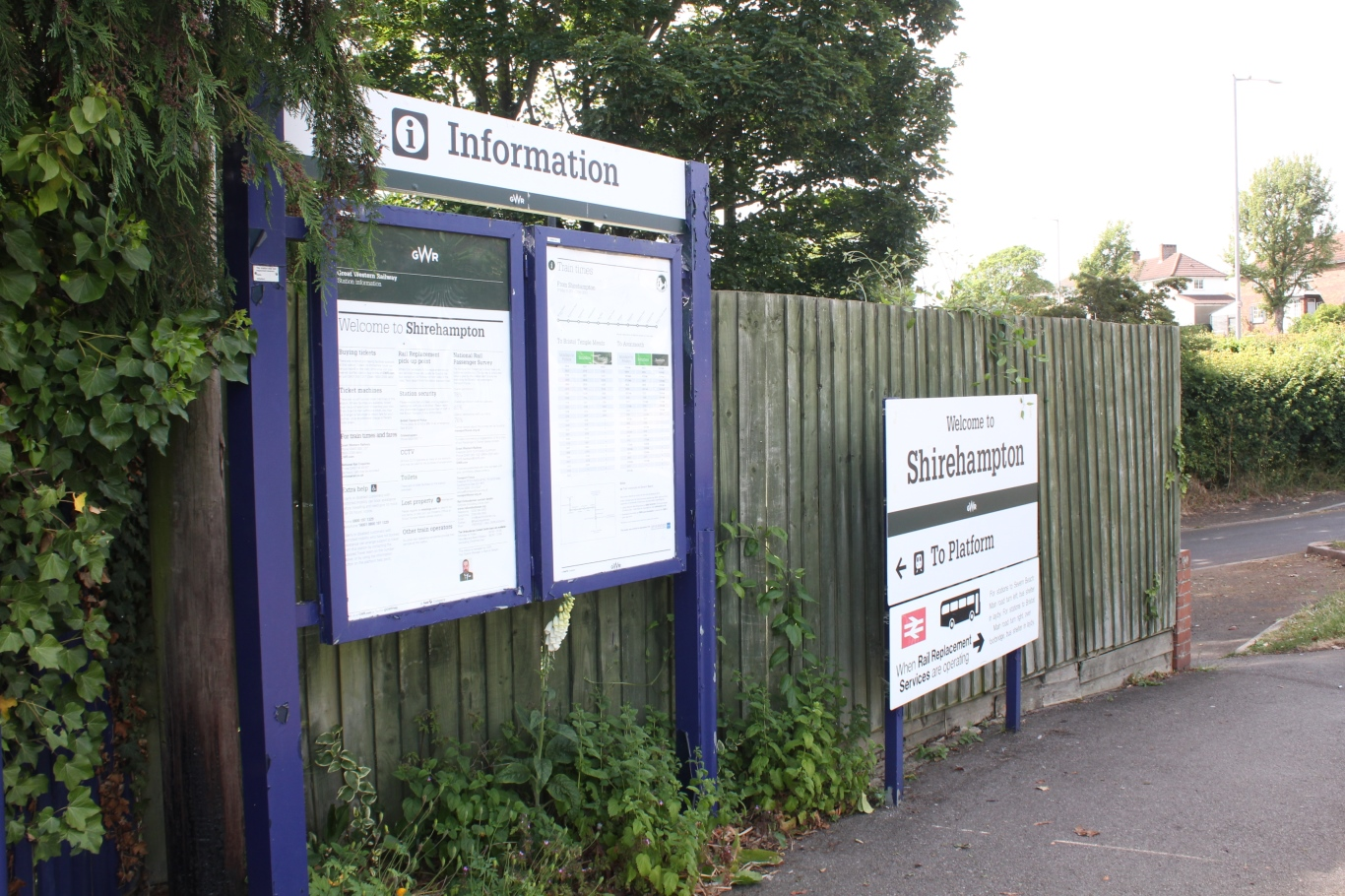
Entrance to Shirehampton station

Timetable information is provided at the station; help points show next train information and allow users to contact railway staff. There is no ticket office or other means for buying or collecting tickets. There is a car park with 10 spaces on Station Road, as well as stands for four bicycles. The nearest bus stops are on the A4 Portway.

The line through Shirehampton has a speed limit of 30 miles per hour (48 km/h) for locomotive-hauled trains and 35 miles per hour (56 km/h) for diesel multiple units. The line, which is not electrified, handles less than 5 million train tonnes per year, has a loading gauge of W6 and a route availability of 7. In the 2012/13 financial year, approximately 50,000 passengers used Shirehampton station, making it the 1,915th busiest station in the country and the eleventh busiest within the Bristol unitary authority area, busier only than St Andrews Road. This was an increase of 34% from the 2002–03 financial year, and reflected a general rise in usage of the Severn Beach Line. (Note: Annual estimated passenger usage based on sales of tickets in stated financial year(s) which end or originate at Shirehampton, from Office of Rail and Road statistics. Methodology may vary year on year.)

== Services ==
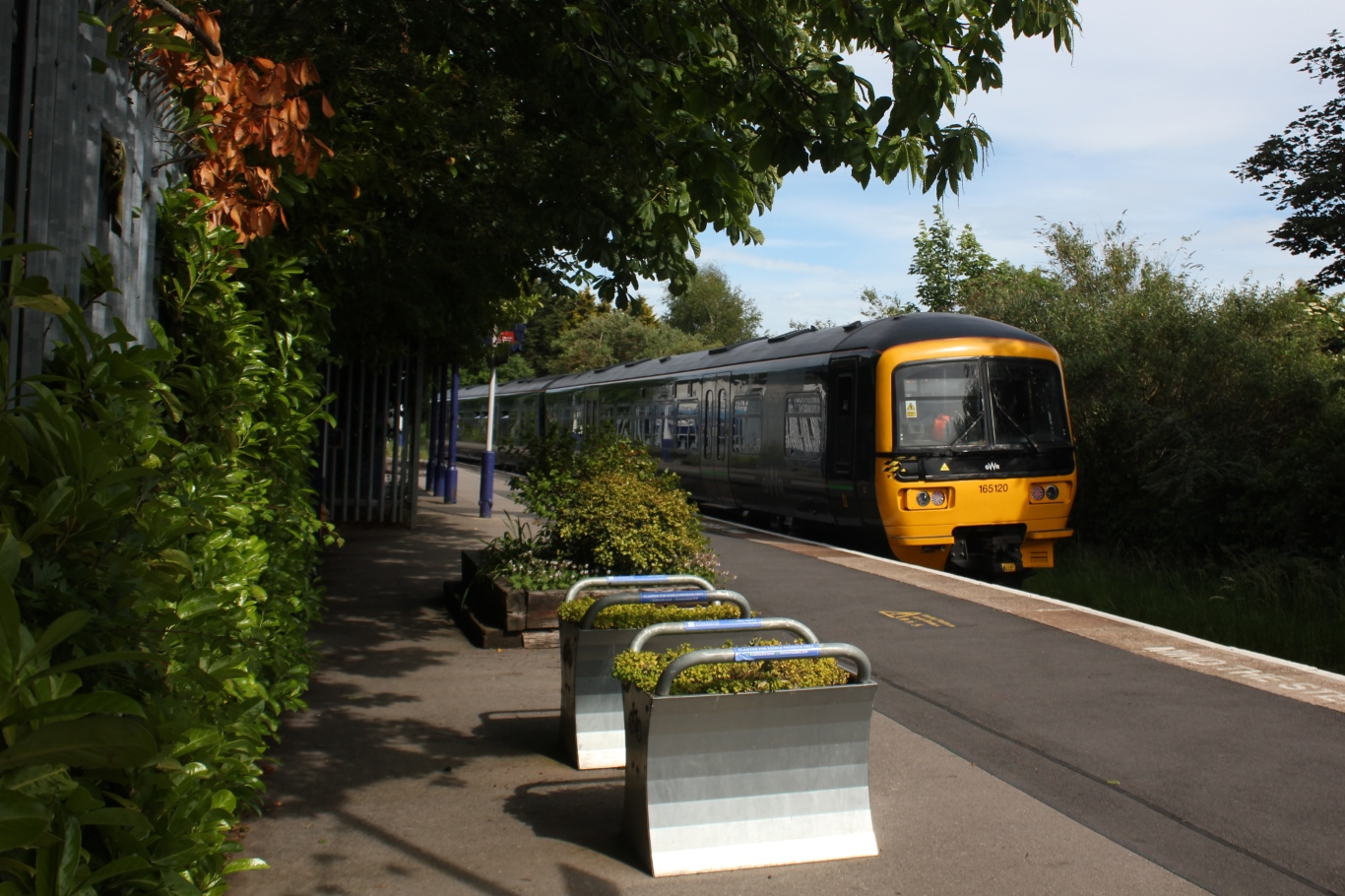
A Class 165 at Shirehampton with a Bristol service

All services at Shirehampton are operated by Great Western Railway using Class 166 Turbo DMUs.

The typical off-peak service in trains per hour is:

- 2 tph to Bristol Temple Meads of which 1 continues to Weston-super-Mare
- 2 tph to Avonmouth of which 1 continues to Severn Beach

On Sundays, there is an hourly service between Bristol Temple Meads and Severn Beach with one train per day to and from Weston-super-Mare.

Services previously ran every 40 minutes in each direction but were increased to half-hourly in the December 2021 timetable change.

| Preceding station | National Rail | Following station |
|---|---|---|
| Portway Park and Ride | Great Western Railway Severn Beach Line | Sea Mills |

== History ==
=== Construction and initial operations ===
The station was opened on 6 March 1865 when services began on the Bristol Port Railway and Pier (BPRP), a self-contained railway which ran along the north bank of the River Avon to a deep water pier on the Severn Estuary at Avonmouth. The route was 4 ft 8 1/2 in (1,435 mm) standard gauge single track, with Shirehampton initially the second station along the line, 3 miles 51 chains (5.9 km) from the southern terminus at Hotwells. Shirehampton was the BPRP's headquarters, and was the site where construction of the railway began – the first sod being turned on 19 February 1863 by the Mayoress of Bristol, Mrs Sholto Vere Hare.

The original station was situated at a passing loop, with a single platform on the north side of the line. The building, which is noted as having been architecturally superior to other stations on the line, contained a booking office, porters' rooms, and an office for the line superintendent. The platform was covered along its entire length. A single-road engine shed was sited at the east end of the station from 1875, but burnt down in 1900. The initial service was six trains per day in each direction, however trains did not stop at Shirehampton on Sundays due to opposition from a local church, but this practice ended in May the same year following complaints from other residents and businesses.

| Preceding station | Historical railways | Following station |
|---|---|---|
| Avonmouth (BPRP) (Note: The Bristol Port Railway and Pier terminal station was simply called "Avonmouth".); Line and station closed. | Bristol Port Railway and Pier (1865–1877) | Sea Mills |

=== Connection to the national network ===
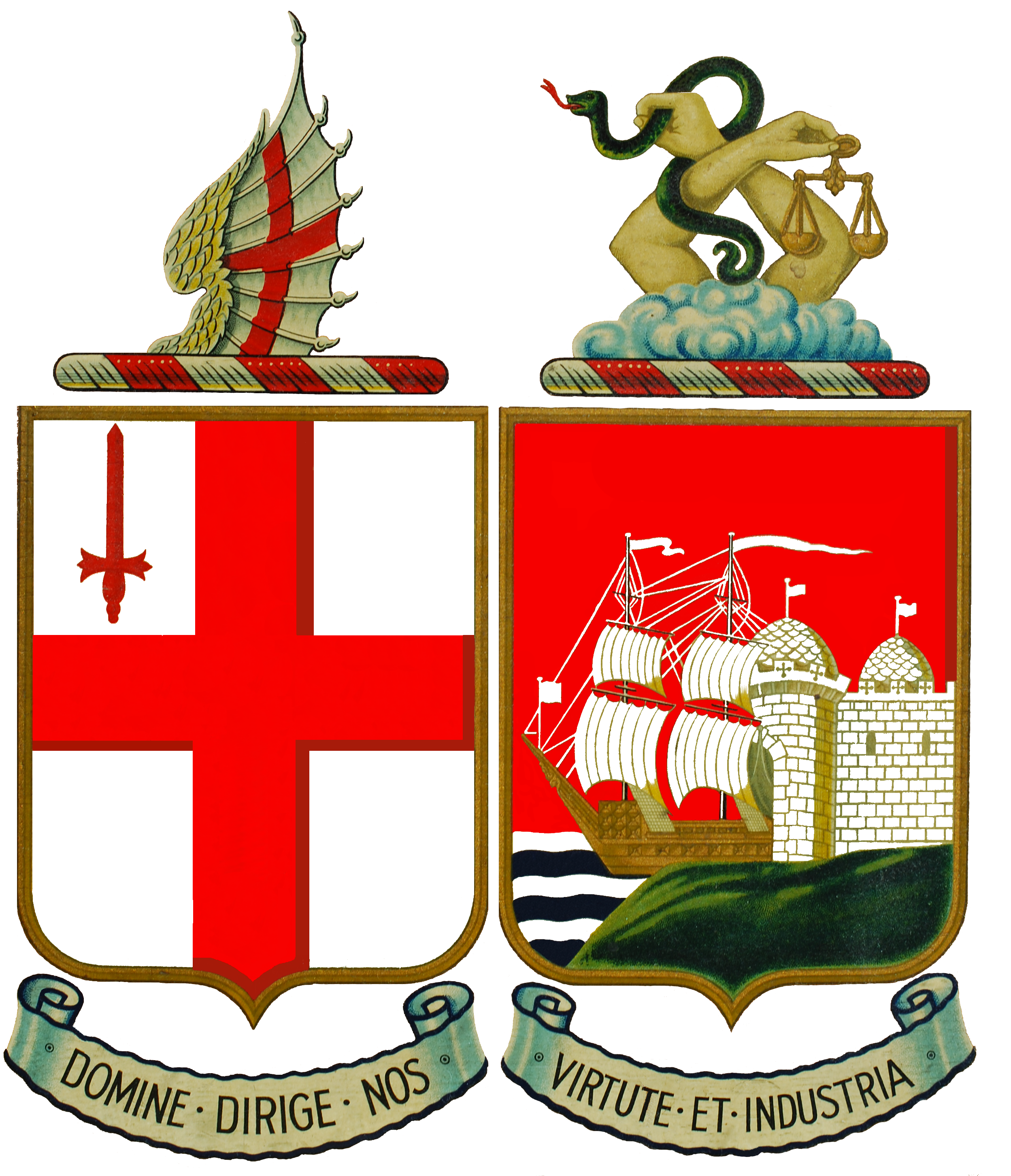
The Great Western Railway began operating trains from Shirehampton in 1885.

The BPRP ran into trouble by 1871 when the terminal pier at Avonmouth became difficult to use due to a build-up of silt. With no prospect of a proper dock being funded without a connection to the national rail network, the Clifton Extension Railway (CER) was approved. This was a joint venture by the BPRP, Great Western Railway and Midland Railway which ran from Sneyd Park Junction, south of Sea Mills, via Clifton Down, to join up with the national network at Narroways Hill Junction. The link opened in 1877, but initially only for goods trains. The route from Sneyd Park Junction to Clifton Down was subsequently cleared for passenger use on 3 August 1878, but the Midland and Great Western Railways did not think the BPRP track was in a suitable condition and so refused to run any passenger trains beyond Clifton Down. Services along the BPRP however increased to eight trains per day in each direction from 1877, and then to ten each way by 1887. From 1 September 1885, when passenger services along the link finally started, the Great Western offered six trains per day each direction between Avonmouth and Bristol Temple Meads. Fearing competition, the BPRP did not allow passengers to use GWR services between its stations. The Midland Railway did not run any passenger services beyond Clifton Down, apart from a one-month trial service in September 1885. Despite the increased traffic the BPRP suffered financially, and was taken over by the CER in 1890.

In 1893 the platform was lengthened to 235 feet (72 m) at a cost of £235, and a station master's house built. A second track was laid along the line in 1903, and a new platform built on the south side of the line, coming into use on 16 May. The station was remodelled at the same time, adding comfortable waiting rooms. The new platform had a waiting room and 20-lever signal box built on it, with an open footbridge to connect the two platforms. A small goods yard and coal sidings were added behind the northern platform, accessible from the east. The yard was subsequently extended in 1921 by Nott Brodie & Co Ltd to handle traffic from construction of the Bristol Portway. By 1910 there were 17 trains from Bristol to Avonmouth and 15 back, increasing to 21 and 19 respectively by 1920.

During the First World War, an Army Remount Service depot was located nearby, with Shirehampton station handling the goods traffic, with up to 60 wagons per day inbound, mostly containing hay and sawdust for the horses. Twelve wagons of manure were dispatched each day, some to Cadbury Road on the Weston, Clevedon and Portishead Light Railway.

After the war, construction of the Bristol Portway along the Avon Gorge necessitated the closure of the line from Sneyd Park Junction to Hotwells, with trains along it ceasing on 3 July 1922. By this point there were nine trains per day from Hotwells, and eight return. To compensate for the loss of service, the Great Western provided an additional four trains daily towards Bristol and six toward Avonmouth. In 1923, grouping resulted in the Midland Railway being absorbed into the London, Midland and Scottish Railway (LMS), and the line continued in a joint arrangement between the Great Western and the LMS. At this point Shirehampton station employed a station master, three clerks and four porters; throughout the 1930s there were an average of ten staff. From 1928 many services to Avonmouth were extended to Severn Beach. By 1947, just before the railways were nationalised, there were 33 services each direction between Avonmouth and Temple Meads, with 18 on Sundays. Some trains made circular trips to and from Temple Meads via Clifton Down and Henbury or Pilning.

| Preceding station | Historical railways | Following station |
|---|---|---|
| Avonmouth (Note: The station which is now known as Avonmouth was originally known as Avonmouth Dock, and should not be confused with the nearby station called Avonmouth Docks.) | Bristol Port Railway and Pier (1877–1890) | Sea Mills |
| Avonmouth | Great Western Railway; Clifton Extension Railway (1885–1948) | Sea Mills |

=== British Rail and privatisation ===
When the railways were nationalised in 1948, services at Shirehampton came under the aegis of the Western Region of British Railways. Staff levels decreased by 1958 to two clerks, two leading porters, one porter, and a stationmaster who was also responsible for Sea Mills railway station. Service levels had decreased slightly by 1955 to 28 towards Avonmouth and 29 towards Bristol, but the services were at regular intervals. Passenger numbers however dropped sharply in 1961 as the result of a fare increase, and so in 1962 a new reduced timetable was enacted, which lost more passengers. A year later in 1963, the Beeching report suggested the complete withdrawal of services along the line, but ultimately only those beyond Severn Beach or via Henbury were withdrawn. Goods services from the station ended on 29 November 1965, and from 17 July 1967 all staffing was withdrawn from stations along the line, including Shirehampton, with tickets issued by the train guard. An 800-ton oil storage tank was built in the station yard in 1967, with deliveries continuing until the mid-eighties. By 2005 the yard had been redeveloped and was occupied by a commercial vehicle hire company. The general reduction in passenger traffic, as well as the transfer of Avonmouth goods traffic to the Henbury Loop Line, allowed the removal of the second track from 19 October 1970, with all services using the original, northern platform. The signal box was taken out of service at the same time, and the buildings on the remaining platform sold off before being destroyed by a fire in the 1990s. The station master's house is now a private dwelling, with the garden containing a small brick building with a chimney surviving from the station buildings. By 1974, service had reduced to 19 trains per day in each direction, with no Sunday services beyond Avonmouth.

British Rail was split into business-led sectors in the 1980s, at which time operations at Shirehampton passed to Regional Railways. At this time, all trains ran to Severn Beach, but the service pattern was irregular. This changed in 1995 when an hourly timetable was introduced for peak times, but northbound services were terminated at Avonmouth.

When the railway was privatised in 1997, local services were franchised to Wales & West, which was succeeded by Wessex Trains, an arm of National Express, in 2001. Following action by Friends of Severn Beach Railway (FOSBR) and a string of protests, services had increased to 10 per day in each direction by 2005, with Bristol City Council providing a subsidy to Wessex Trains. The Wessex franchise was amalgamated with the Great Western franchise into the Greater Western franchise from 2006, and responsibility passed to First Great Western, a subsidiary company of FirstGroup, rebranded as Great Western Railway in 2015. A minimum service requirement was written into the franchise agreement, ensuring an hourly service along the line, and this has since been increased to three trains every two hours (24 trains per day). Sunday services to Severn Beach were restored in 2010.

| Preceding station | Historical railways | Following station |
|---|---|---|
| Avonmouth | Western Region of British Railways; Severn Beach Line (1948–1982) | Sea Mills |
| Avonmouth | Regional Railways; Severn Beach Line (1982–1997) | Sea Mills |
| Avonmouth | Wales & West; Severn Beach Line (1997–2001) | Sea Mills |
| Avonmouth | Wessex Trains; Severn Beach Line (2001–2006) | Sea Mills |

== Future ==
First Great Western declined a contractual option to continue the Greater Western passenger franchise (of which services at Shirehampton are a part) beyond 2013, citing a desire for a longer-term contract due to the impending upgrade to the Great Western Main Line. The franchise was put out to tender, but the process was halted and later scrapped due to the fallout from the collapse of the InterCity West Coast franchise competition. A two-year franchise extension until September 2015 was agreed in October 2013, and subsequently extended until March 2019.

With the coming upgrade to the Great Western Main Line, the main line from London to Bristol is due to be electrified by 2016. However, the electrification will not extend beyond the main lines, so Shirehampton will continue to be served by diesel trains, with the current "Sprinter" units expected to be replaced by Class 165 and 166 "Turbo" units. Stephen Williams, former MP for Bristol West; and the group Friends of Suburban Bristol Railways supports the electrification being extended to the Severn Beach Line.

Improved services at Shirehampton are called for as part of the Greater Bristol Metro scheme, a rail transport plan which aims to enhance transport capacity in the Bristol area. There is an aspiration for half-hourly services, with trains towards Bristol terminating alternately at Portishead and Bath Spa, however due to the large sections of the Severn Beach Line which are single-track and to the congested main line from Temple Meads, such frequency is not currently feasible. The scheme was given the go-ahead in July 2012 as part of the City Deal, whereby local councils would be given greater control over money by the government. There are also calls for the reopening of the Henbury Loop Line, which could allow a direct service from Shirehampton to Bristol Parkway via Avonmouth. Plans for a loop were rejected by the West of England Joint Transport Board, however Bristol City Councillors voted to send the decision back to the board for further discussion.

== See also ==
- Public transport in Bristol
