= Avonmouth railway station =

Railway station in Bristol, England

Avonmouth
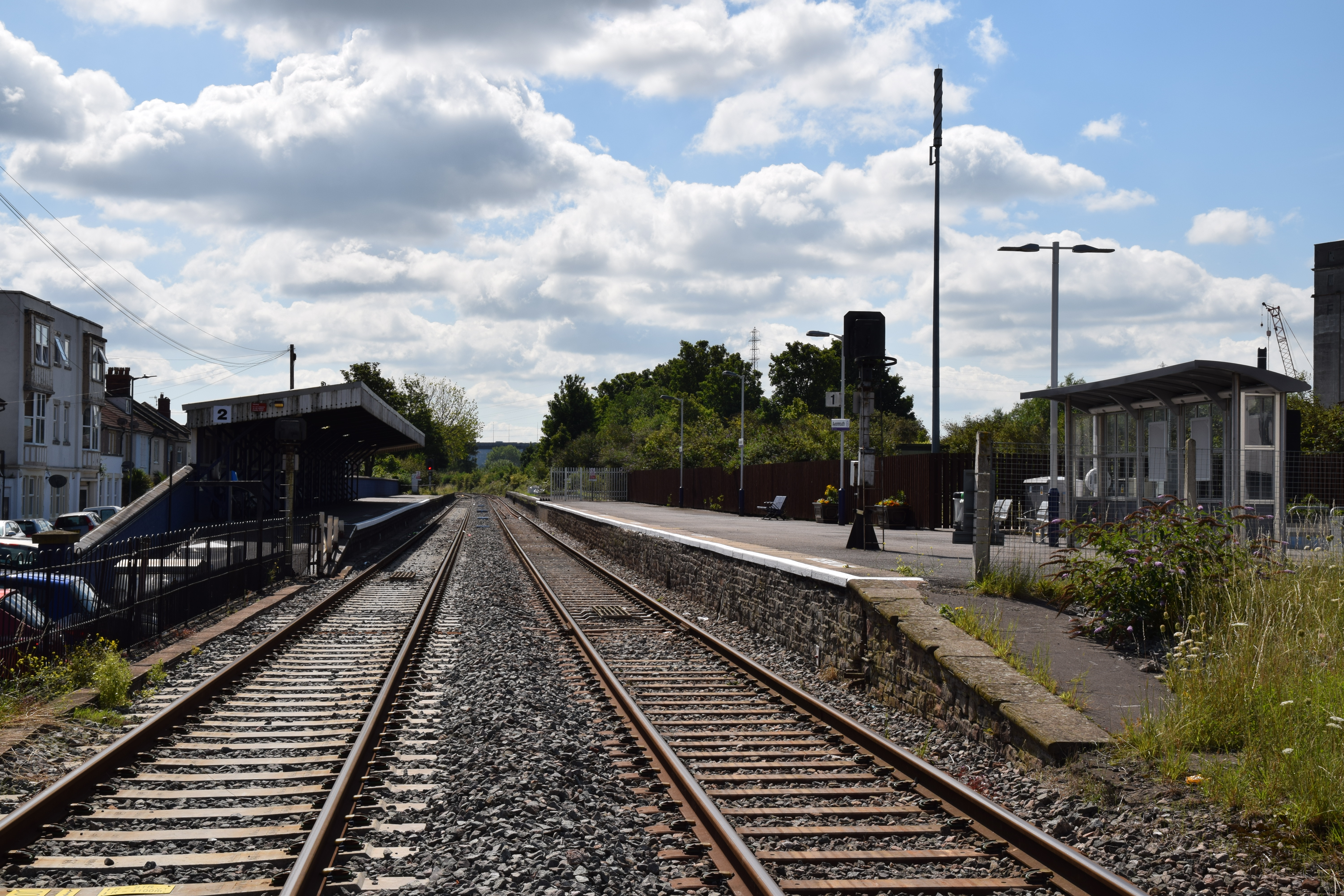
- Avonmouth station in 2017

General information
- Location: Avonmouth, Bristol; England
- Coordinates: 51.5001°N 2.6992°W
- Grid reference: ST515781
- Manager: Great Western Railway
- Platforms: 2

Other information
- Station code: AVN
- Classification: DfT category F1

History
- Original company: Bristol Port Railway and Pier
- Pre-grouping: Great Western Railway / Midland Railway
- Post-grouping: Great Western Railway / London, Midland and Scottish Railway

Key dates
- 1868: Opened as a workers' platform
- 1877: Opened as Avonmouth Dock
- 1 September 1885: Rebuilt and renamed Avonmouth Dock Joint
- 1926: Rebuilt
- 20 June 1966: Closed to goods traffic; renamed as Avonmouth

Passengers
- 2021/22: ▲88,332
- 2022/23: ▲0.110 million
- 2023/24: ▲0.135 million
- 2024/25: ▲0.171 million
- 2025/26: ▼0.166 million
Location
Notes
- Passenger statistics from the Office of Rail and Road

Avonmouth railway station is located on the Severn Beach Line and serves the district of Avonmouth in Bristol, England. It is 9 miles (14 km) from Bristol Temple Meads. Its three letter station code is AVN. The station has two platforms, on either side of two running lines. As of 2015 it is managed by Great Western Railway, which is the third franchise to be responsible for the station since privatisation in 1997. They provide all train services at the station, mainly a train every 30 minutes to Bristol Temple Meads and one every hour to Severn Beach.

The station was opened in 1877 by the Bristol Port Railway and Pier, a railway which ran along the River Avon from Hotwells to a pier at Avonmouth. The station, originally known as Avonmouth Dock, had a single platform, but was rebuilt with two platforms by the Great Western and Midland Railways in 1885 when they began services via Clifton Down. The station was enhanced numerous times in the early part of the twentieth century, and by 1913 employed 72 staff. Facilities included a goods yard, signal box and engine shed.

The Severn Beach Line declined over the latter half of the twentieth century, with passenger numbers falling significantly. Goods services at Avonmouth ended in 1966, and all staff were withdrawn in 1967. Services had decreased to 10 per day each direction by 2005, but have since increased to a train every 30 minutes to Bristol and hourly to Severn Beach.

== Description ==
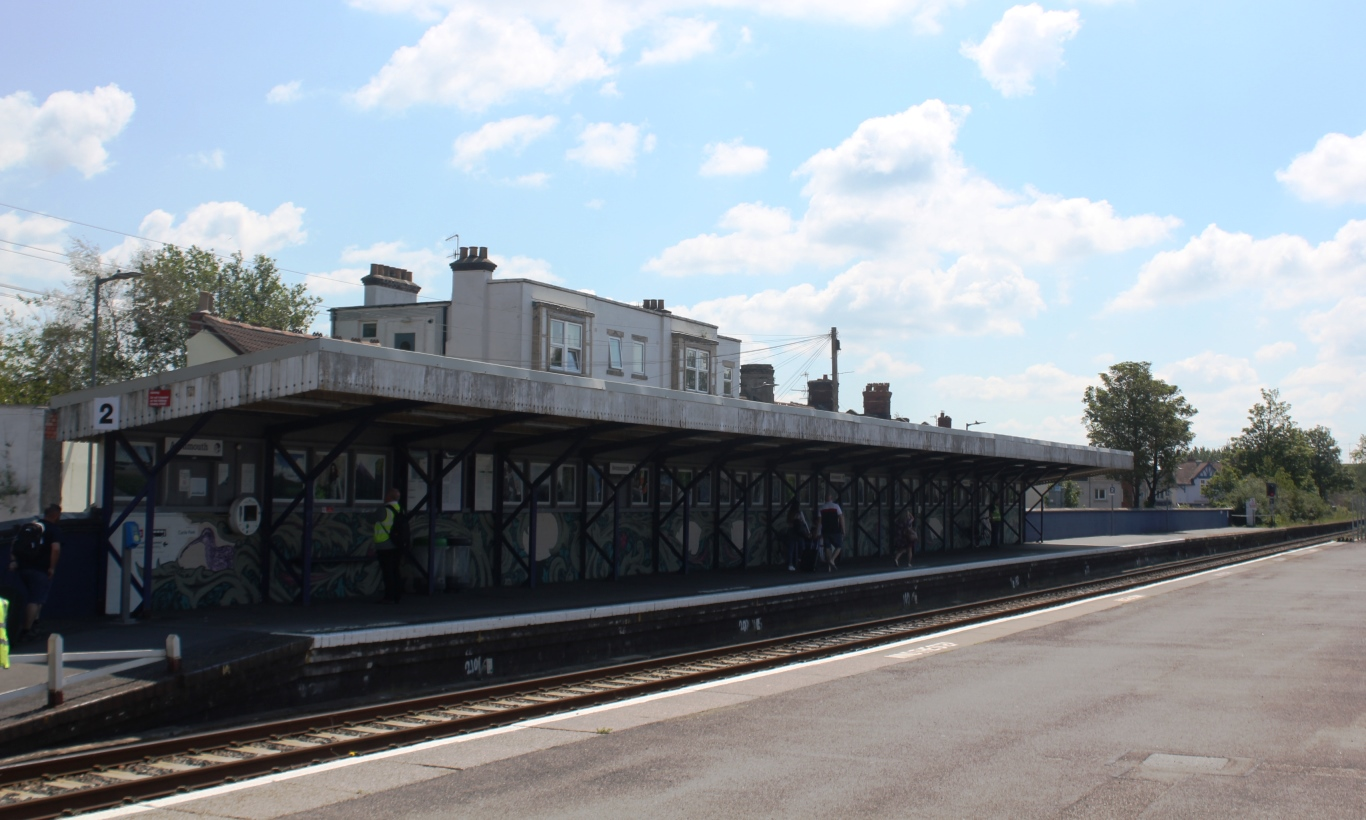
The wooden canopy covering platform 2 at Avonmouth

The station is located in the Avonmouth district of Bristol, an area of mixed industrial and residential usage. The station sits to the south of the junction of Gloucester Road and Portview Road, the tracks running to parallel to Portview Road and crossing Gloucester Road at a level crossing. The station is on the Severn Beach Line from Bristol Temple Meads to Severn Beach, 9 miles 02 chains (14.5 km) from Temple Meads and 4 miles 42 chains (7.3 km) from Severn Beach. (Note: Railways in the United Kingdom are, for historical reasons, measured in miles and chains. There are 80 chains to the mile.) The next station towards Temple Meads is Portway Park and Ride. The next station towards Severn Beach is St Andrews Road.

The station is on a north-west/south-east alignment, with two platforms separated by two running lines. The southern "up" platform, adjacent to the "Up Main" line, is used for trains towards Severn Beach. The northern "down" platform, adjacent to the "Down Main" line, is bidirectionally signalled, allowing it to be used by terminating trains and those heading towards Bristol. Both platforms have significant portions of their length fenced off, giving usable lengths of 91 yards (83 m) for the southern platform and 70 yards (64 m) for the northern.

Facilities at the station are minimal – there is a wooden canopy and bench seating on the northern platform, with a small metal shelter on the southern. Timetable information is provided; help points show next train information and allow users to contact railway staff. There is no ticket office or other means for buying or collecting tickets, however an electronic ticketing trial is to be rolled out at the station. There is a car park with six spaces, as well as stands for four bicycles. The nearest bus stops are 150 metres (160 yd) away on Avonmouth Road.

The line through Avonmouth has a speed limit of 30 miles per hour (48 km/h) for locomotive-hauled trains and 50 miles per hour (80 km/h) for diesel multiple units. The line, which is not electrified, handles less than 5 million train tonnes per year, has a loading gauge of W6 and a route availability of 7. In the 2013/14 financial year, more than 110,000 passengers used Avonmouth station, making it the 1,635th busiest station in the country and the sixth busiest within the Bristol unitary authority area. This was an increase of 175% from the 2002–03 financial year, and reflected a general rise in usage of the Severn Beach Line. (Note: Annual estimated passenger usage based on sales of tickets in stated financial year(s) which end or originate at Avonmouth, from Office of Rail and Road statistics. Methodology may vary year on year.) The 2014-15 estimates of station usage saw a further increase of 8% to 120,000 making it the 1,614th busiest station in the country.

== Services ==
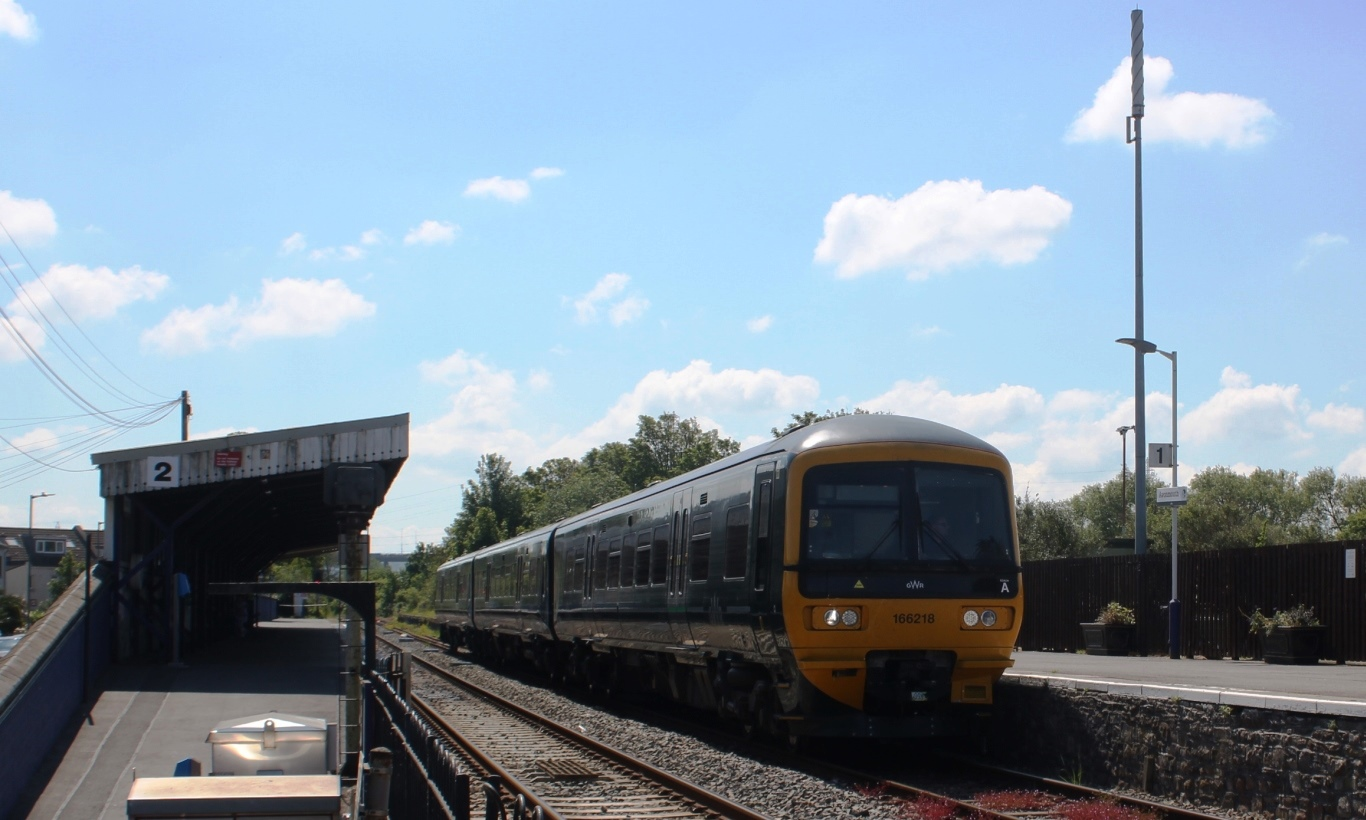
A Class 166 at Avonmouth with a Severn Beach service

All services at Avonmouth are operated by Great Western Railway using mainly using Class 165 and 166 Networker Turbo DMUs and the occasional Class 158 Express Sprinter DMU.

The typical off-peak service in trains per hour is:

- 2 tph to Bristol Temple Meads of which 1 continues to Weston-super-Mare
- 1 tph to Severn Beach

On Sundays, there is an hourly service between Bristol Temple Meads and Severn Beach with one train per day to and from Weston-super-Mare.

Services previously ran every 40 minutes to Bristol and every two hours to Severn Beach but were increased to half-hourly to Bristol and hourly to Severn Beach in the December 2021 timetable change. Sundays see an hourly service between Bristol and Severn Beach with some services extending to / from Weston-Super-Mare.

Preceding station	National Rail	Following station
Terminus	Great Western Railway Severn Beach Line	Portway Park & Ride
St Andrews Road	Great Western Railway Severn Beach Line	Portway Park & Ride

== History ==
=== Construction and early operations ===
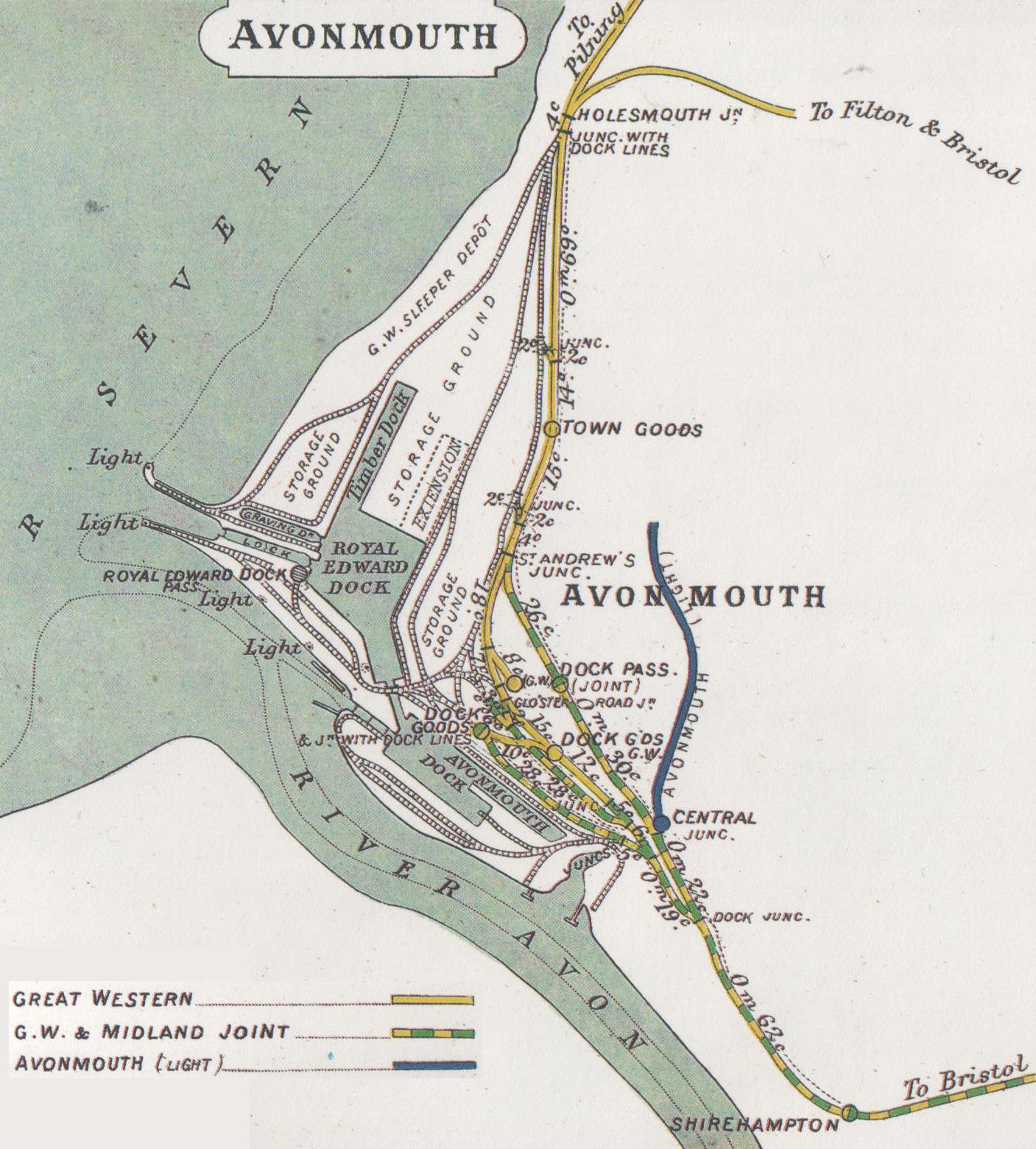
The Railway Clearing House Atlas of 1914 shows the then-extensive railway network around Avonmouth.

The railways first came to Avonmouth in 1865, when services began on the Bristol Port Railway and Pier (BPRP), a self-contained railway which ran along the north bank of the River Avon to a deep water pier on the Severn Estuary. The BPRP line ran through the site of the current station and 1 mile 72 chains (3.1 km) beyond to a terminus at the first Avonmouth station. The BPRP ran into trouble by 1871 when the terminal pier at Avonmouth became difficult to use due to a build-up of silt. With no prospect of a proper dock being funded without a connection to the national rail network, the Clifton Extension Railway (CER) was approved. This was a joint venture by the BPRP, Great Western Railway (GWR) and Midland Railway (MR) which ran from Sneyd Park Junction, south of Sea Mills, via Clifton Down, to join up with the national network at Narroways Hill Junction. The link opened in 1877, but initially only for goods trains. The route from Sneyd Park Junction to Clifton Down was subsequently cleared for passenger use on 3 August 1878, but the Midland and Great Western Railways did not think the BPRP track was in a suitable condition and so refused to run any passenger trains beyond Clifton Down.

The station, originally known as Avonmouth Dock, was opened in 1877, shortly after the opening of the Avonmouth Docks in February that year. It was built on, or very near to, the site of a halt built in 1868 for the Docks' construction workers. The local area was still mostly rural – there were a few buildings around the station area, as well as the docks, with the closest extent of the Bristol conurbation 1 mile (1.6 km) away at Shirehampton. The station cost £275 to build, and was merely a platform on the south side of the single track, served by eight trains per day between Hotwells and the BPRP's Avonmouth terminus, increasing to ten per day from 1887. The Great Western and Midland Railways considered the station inadequate for the passenger numbers expected, and so purchased additional land to enhance the station with extra tracks. The new station comprised a wide island platform – the northern face on the original through line, the southern face being for a new terminal line. The station, now known as Avonmouth Dock Joint, was constructed using mainly wood and corrugated iron. It was opened on 1 September 1885, coinciding with the beginning of passenger services beyond Clifton Down. The Great Western initially offered six trains per day each direction between Avonmouth Dock and Bristol Temple Meads. Fearing competition, the BPRP did not allow passengers to use GWR services between its stations. The Midland Railway did not run any passenger services beyond Clifton Down, apart from a one-month trial service in September 1885. Despite the increased traffic the BPRP suffered financially, and was taken over by the CER in 1890. The BPRP's Avonmouth terminus closed to the public in 1902, after which all trains terminated at Avonmouth Dock.

Preceding station	Historical railways	Following station
Avonmouth (BPRP) (Note: The Bristol Port Railway and Pier terminal station was simply called "Avonmouth".); Line and station closed.	Bristol Port Railway and Pier (1877–1890)	Shirehampton
Avonmouth (BPRP); Line and station closed.	Great Western Railway; Bristol Port Railway and Pier (1890–1902)	Shirehampton

=== Early twentieth century ===
The station went through numerous enhancements in the first part of the twentieth century. A new platform canopy and urinal were provided in 1900 at a cost of £250. Further improvements followed in 1902 at a cost of £80; and in August 1904 significant enhancements to the station buildings and an extension of the platform cost a total of £1,570. A 60 feet (18 m) turntable was constructed in December 1903; with a signal box, known as Avonmouth Dock Passenger, installed at the end of the platform. Dedicated goods staff were employed from the start of 1904, with that year also seeing the installation of a run-around loop for the terminal platform. A small engine shed was added in January 1905. In 1910, some passenger trains once again began to run beyond Avonmouth Dock, continuing towards Henbury on the newly opened Henbury Loop Line, which allowed goods trains to the docks to avoid the steep Clifton Down Tunnel. Other trains arrived from London via the loop, connecting with steamer services to Canada and Jamaica. At this point there were 17 trains from Bristol to Avonmouth Dock and 15 back each day; increasing to 21 and 19 respectively by 1920. The station was well-staffed, with 25 station staff and 47 goods staff in 1913. Positions included stationmaster; booking clerks; posters; and outdoor porters, who took goods to ships in the docks.

During the First World War, an Army Remount Service depot was located near Shirehampton. Over the course of the war, Avonmouth Dock Joint handled 35,000 animals, mainly horses and mules, en route to the depot. July 1917 saw the introduction of platform tickets, to capitalise on people using the station to bid farewell to friends heading overseas, or to welcome those returning. The platform was lengthened to 330 feet (100 m) in December 1917. A second through track was added in 1918, and so a new cinder-covered platform was built on the north side of the line. The two platforms were linked by a footbridge and a level crossing. The cost of the new platform and the lengthening works was £7,420.

After the war, construction of the Bristol Portway along the Avon Gorge necessitated the closure of the line from Sneyd Park Junction to Hotwells, with trains along it ceasing on 3 July 1922. By this point there were nine trains per day from Hotwells, and eight return. To compensate for the loss of service, the Great Western provided an additional four trains daily from Avonmouth Dock to Bristol and six return. In 1923, grouping resulted in the Midland Railway being absorbed into the London, Midland and Scottish Railway (LMS), and the line continued in a joint arrangement between the Great Western and the LMS. The engine shed was closed in 1924.

By the mid-1920s, the station was proving inadequate for the passenger numbers, and so work began on a comprehensive rebuild in 1926. The new buildings were made of brick; with a large, four-chimneyed building containing most of the facilities; as well as a separate parcels office. The northern platform had a wooden awning built, which is still in place today.

From 1928 many services to Avonmouth Dock were extended to Severn Beach. By 1947, just before the railways were nationalised, there were 33 services each direction between Avonmouth Dock and Temple Meads, with 18 on Sundays. Some trains made circular trips to and from Temple Meads via Clifton Down and Henbury or Pilning.

Preceding station	Historical railways	Following station
Terminus	Great Western Railway; Clifton Extension Railway (1902–1910)	Shirehampton
Hallen Halt	Great Western Railway; Clifton Extension Railway (1910–1917)	Shirehampton
St Andrews Road	Great Western Railway; Clifton Extension Railway (1917–1948)	Shirehampton

=== British Rail and privatisation ===
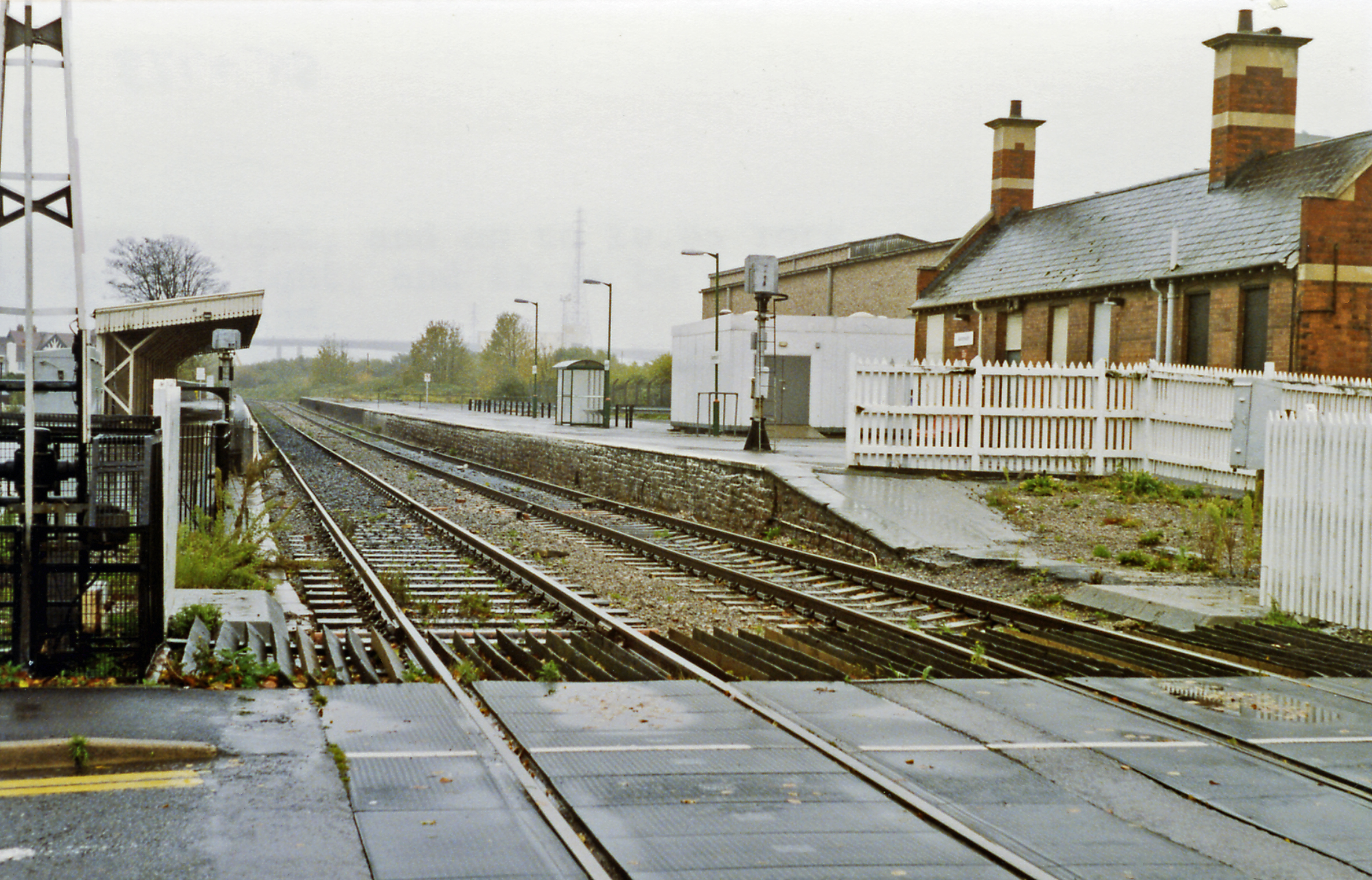
The station in 1992, looking along the lines towards Bristol.

When the railways were nationalised in 1948, services at Avonmouth Dock came under the aegis of the Western Region of British Railways. By 1955, service levels had decreased slightly to 28 trains per day from Bristol and 29 return, but the services were at regular intervals. Passenger numbers however dropped sharply in 1961 as the result of a fare increase, and so in 1962 a new reduced timetable was enacted, which lost more passengers. A year later in 1963, the Beeching report suggested the complete withdrawal of services along the line, but ultimately only those beyond Severn Beach or via Henbury were withdrawn. Goods services from the station ended on 20 June 1966, the same day that the station was renamed "Avonmouth". The bay platform was taken out of use and the land later taken for industrial buildings. From 17 July 1967 all staffing was withdrawn from stations along the line, including Avonmouth, with tickets issued by the train guard. The station buildings on the island platform survived into the 1970s, as did the footbridge, but with the exception of the parcels office, all were later demolished. The parcels office was in use in 2006 as a hairdressing salon. The signal box was closed in January 1969, and in September 1973 the wooden level crossing gates were replaced by automatic lifting barriers. By 1974, service had reduced to 19 trains per day in each direction, with no Sunday services to Severn Beach.

British Rail was split into business-led sectors in the 1980s, at which time operations at Avonmouth passed to Regional Railways. At this time, all trains ran to Severn Beach, but the service pattern was irregular. This changed in 1995 when an hourly timetable was introduced for peak times, but northbound services were terminated at Avonmouth.

When the railway was privatised in 1997, local services were franchised to Wales & West, which was succeeded by Wessex Trains, an arm of National Express, in 2001. Following action by Friends of Severn Beach Railway and a string of protests, services had increased to 10 per day in each direction by 2005, with Bristol City Council providing a subsidy to Wessex Trains. The Wessex franchise was amalgamated with the Great Western franchise into the Greater Western franchise from 2006, and responsibility passed to First Great Western, a subsidiary company of FirstGroup, subsequently rebranded as Great Western Railway in 2015. A minimum service requirement was written into the franchise agreement, ensuring an hourly service along the line, and this has since been increased to three trains every two hours (25 trains per day). Sunday services to Severn Beach were restored in 2010.

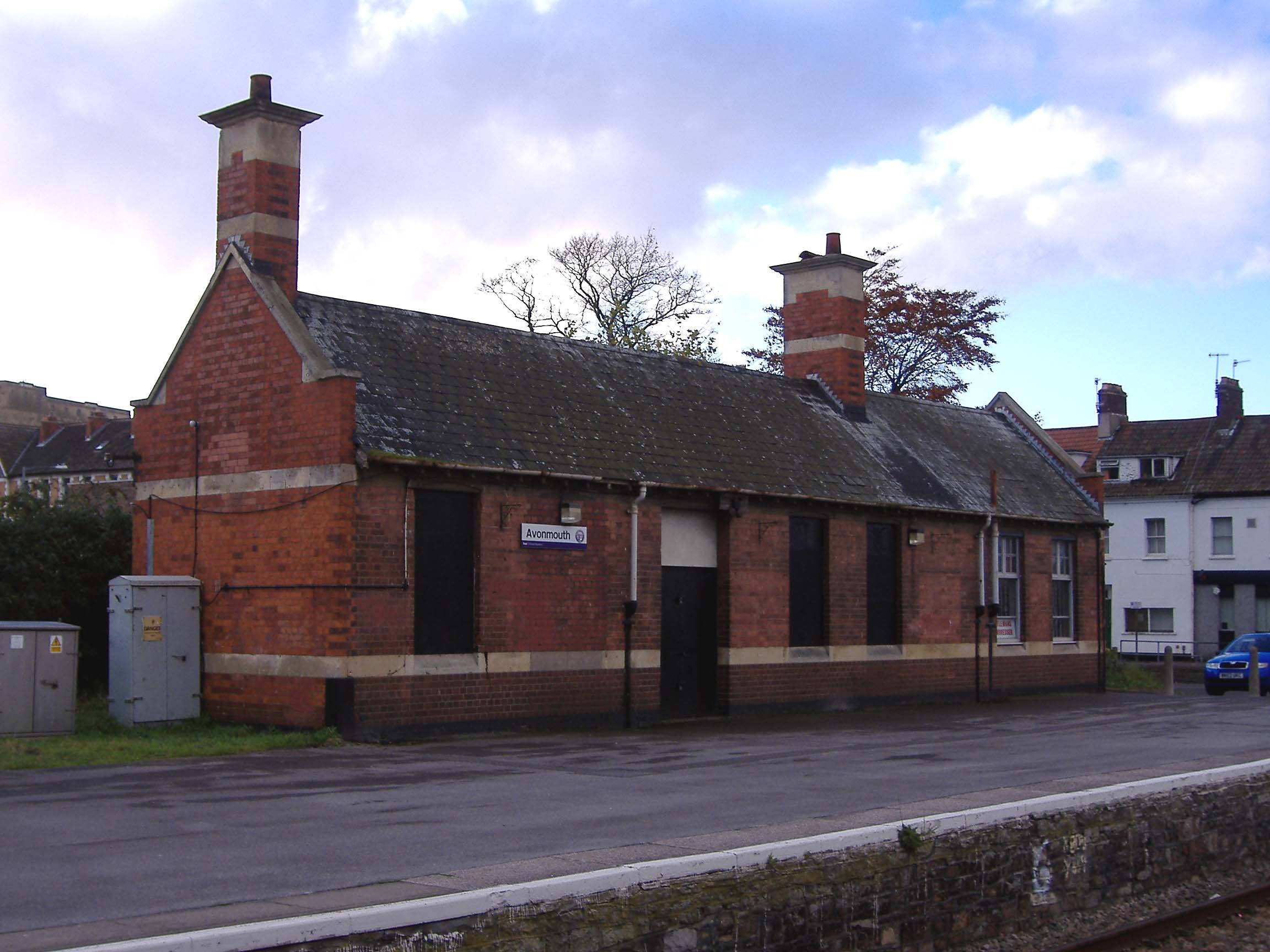
The old parcel facility, the last-surviving station building, was demolished in 2015.

The final remaining station building, the old parcels office, was demolished in 2015. Local rail campaigners, including Friends of Suburban Bristol Railways and MP Charlotte Leslie, petitioned to prevent the demolition, however Network Rail stated that the cost of restoration was too high and that it had become a safety risk.

Preceding station	Historical railways	Following station
St Andrews Road	Western Region of British Railways; Severn Beach Line (1948–1982)	Shirehampton
St Andrews Road	Regional Railways; Severn Beach Line (1982–1997)	Shirehampton
St Andrews Road	Wales & West; Severn Beach Line (1997–2001)	Shirehampton
St Andrews Road	Wessex Trains; Severn Beach Line (2001–2006)	Shirehampton

== Future ==
First Great Western declined a contractual option to continue the Greater Western passenger franchise (of which services at Avonmouth are a part) beyond 2013, citing a desire for a longer-term contract due to the impending upgrade to the Great Western Main Line. The franchise was put out to tender, but the process was halted and later scrapped due to the fallout from the collapse of the InterCity West Coast franchise competition. A two-year franchise extension until September 2015 was agreed in October 2013, and subsequently extended until March 2019.

With the coming upgrade to the Great Western Main Line, the main line from London to Bristol is due to be electrified by 2016. However, the electrification will not extend beyond the main lines, so Avonmouth will continue to be served by diesel trains. Stephen Williams, MP for Bristol West; and the group Friends of Suburban Bristol Railways support the electrification being extended to the Severn Beach Line.

Improved services at Avonmouth are called for as part of the Greater Bristol Metro scheme, a rail transport plan which aims to enhance transport capacity in the Bristol area. There is an aspiration for half-hourly services, with trains towards Bristol terminating alternately at Portishead and Bath Spa, however due to the large sections of the Severn Beach Line which are single-track, and to the congested main line from Temple Meads, such frequency is not currently feasible. The enhancement scheme was given the go-ahead in July 2012 as part of the City Deal, whereby local councils would be given greater control over money by the government. There are also calls for the reopening of the Henbury Loop Line, which could allow a direct service from Avonmouth to Bristol Parkway. Plans for a loop were rejected by the West of England Joint Transport Board, however Bristol City Councillors voted to send the decision back to the board for further discussion.

== See also ==
- Public transport in Bristol
