= Avonmouth =

Port and suburb of Bristol, England

Coordinates: 51.501°N 2.699°W

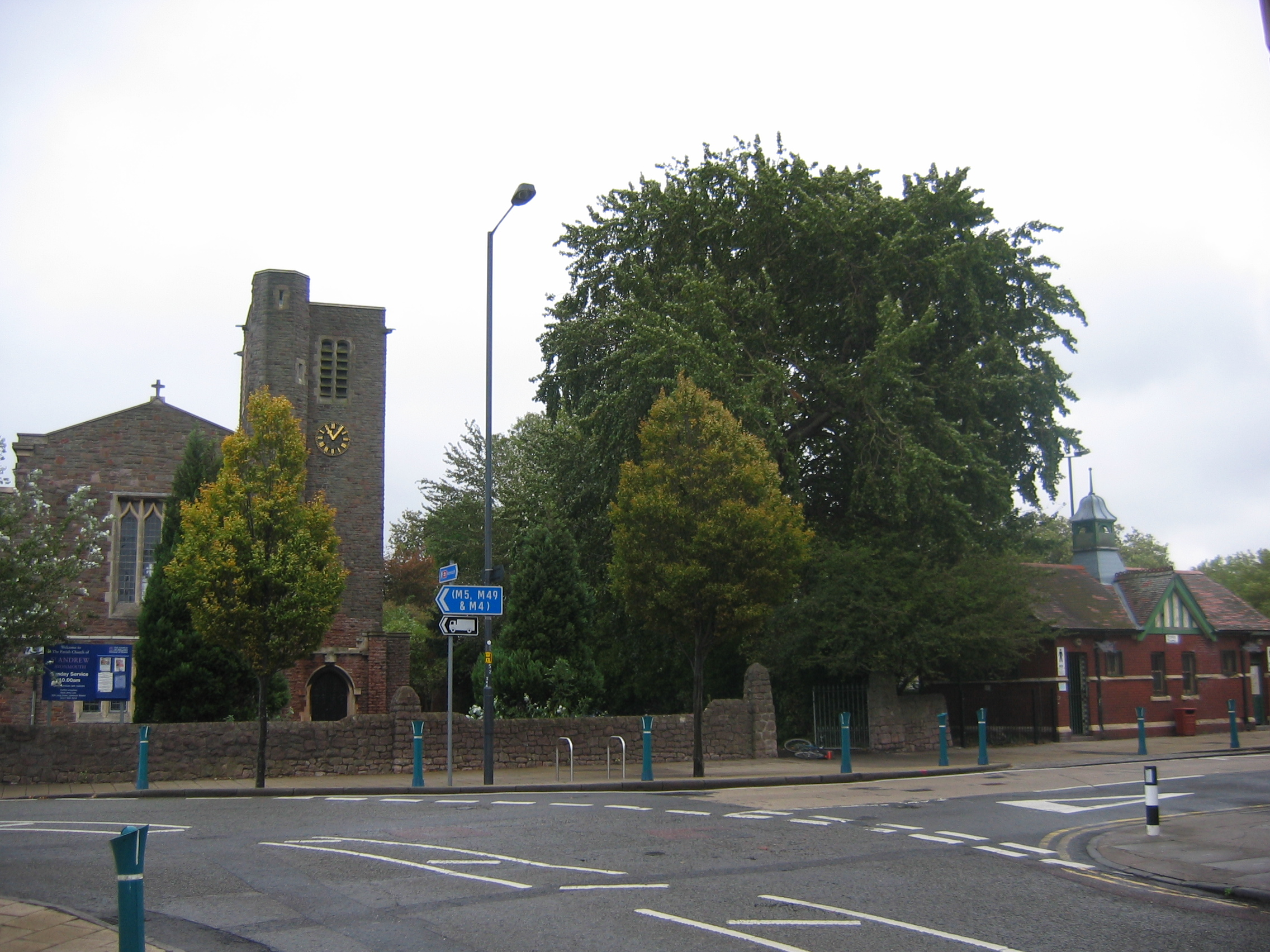

- Location within Bristol
- Population: 3,402 2011 Census - Avonmouth equates to output areas Bristol 008E and 008F
- OS grid reference: ST516785
  - London: 110 miles (180 km)
- Unitary authority: Bristol
- Ceremonial county: Bristol
- Region: South West
- Country: England
- Sovereign state: United Kingdom
- Post town: BRISTOL
- Postcode district: BS11
- Dialling code: 0117
- Police: Avon and Somerset
- Fire: Avon
- Ambulance: South Western
- UK Parliament: Bristol North West

Avonmouth (/ˈeɪ.vənmaʊθ/ AY-vən-mowth) is a port and outer suburb of Bristol, England, on the north bank of the mouth of the River Avon and the eastern shore of the Severn Estuary. Part of the Port of Bristol, Avonmouth Docks is important to the region's maritime economy, hosting large vessels for the unloading and exporting of heavier goods. Much of the land use is industrial, including warehousing, light industry, electrical power and sanitation. The M5 motorway bisects the neighbourhood, with junctions onto the A4 road and M49 motorway, and it has stations on the Severn Beach line railway.

Avonmouth is part of the Bristol City Council electoral ward of Avonmouth and Lawrence Weston, which also includes Shirehampton and the western end of Lawrence Weston. (Note: Wards are periodically redrawn on arithmetical grounds to avoid malapportionment which arises from adult population change increasing or decreasing electors per councillor)

== Geography ==
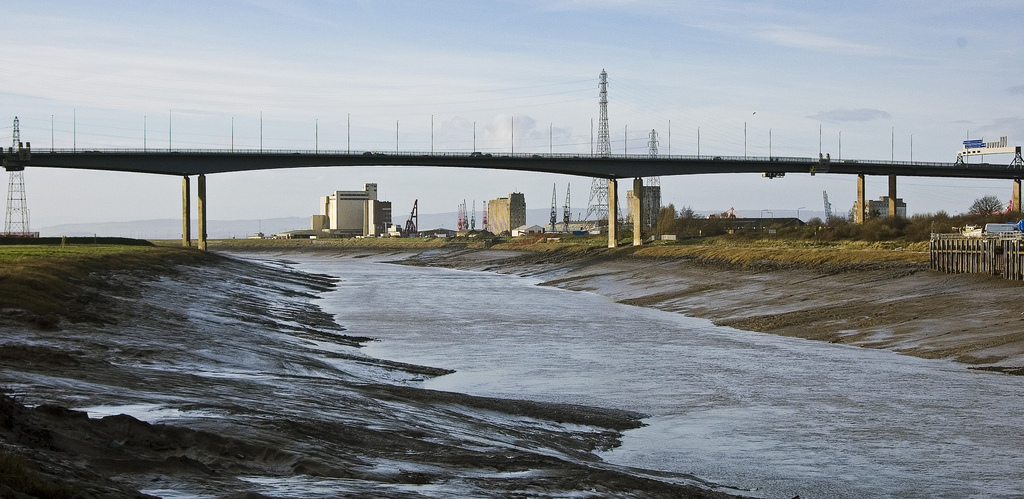
The River Avon with Avonmouth and the M5 bridge

Avonmouth is approximately rectangular, its length favouring the Severn shore, and sits on the north bank of the Avon, west-north-west of Bristol city centre. Both estuaries have been defensively embanked, primarily to allow the construction of the large Avonmouth Docks, which occupy most of the western part. The related Royal Portbury Dock is across the Avon (in Easton-in-Gordano). Avonmouth is home to chemical manufacturing plants, and north of the Avonmouth Docks is the gas-fired Seabank Power Station. Its light industrial and warehouse companies include Nisbets.

Avonmouth is the only part of Bristol west of the M5 motorway. The long-established residential area is between the industrialised zone and the motorway. The Avonmouth Bridge takes the motorway over the Avon to Somerset. The M49 motorway runs from the M5 at Avonmouth north to the M4 motorway at the Second Severn Crossing to Wales. The old Severn Bridge and the M48 motorway are linked to Avonmouth by the A403. The Welsh cities of Newport and Cardiff are visible from Avonmouth's coastline.

The Portway, part of the A4, connects Avonmouth with the centre of Bristol. Avonmouth is also served by a usually hourly train service on the Severn Beach Line to central Bristol from Avonmouth railway station, Portway Park & Ride (in the southeast of the neighbourhood) and St Andrews Road (in the western industrial zone).

A new deep-sea container terminal has been proposed for Avonmouth.

== Etymology ==
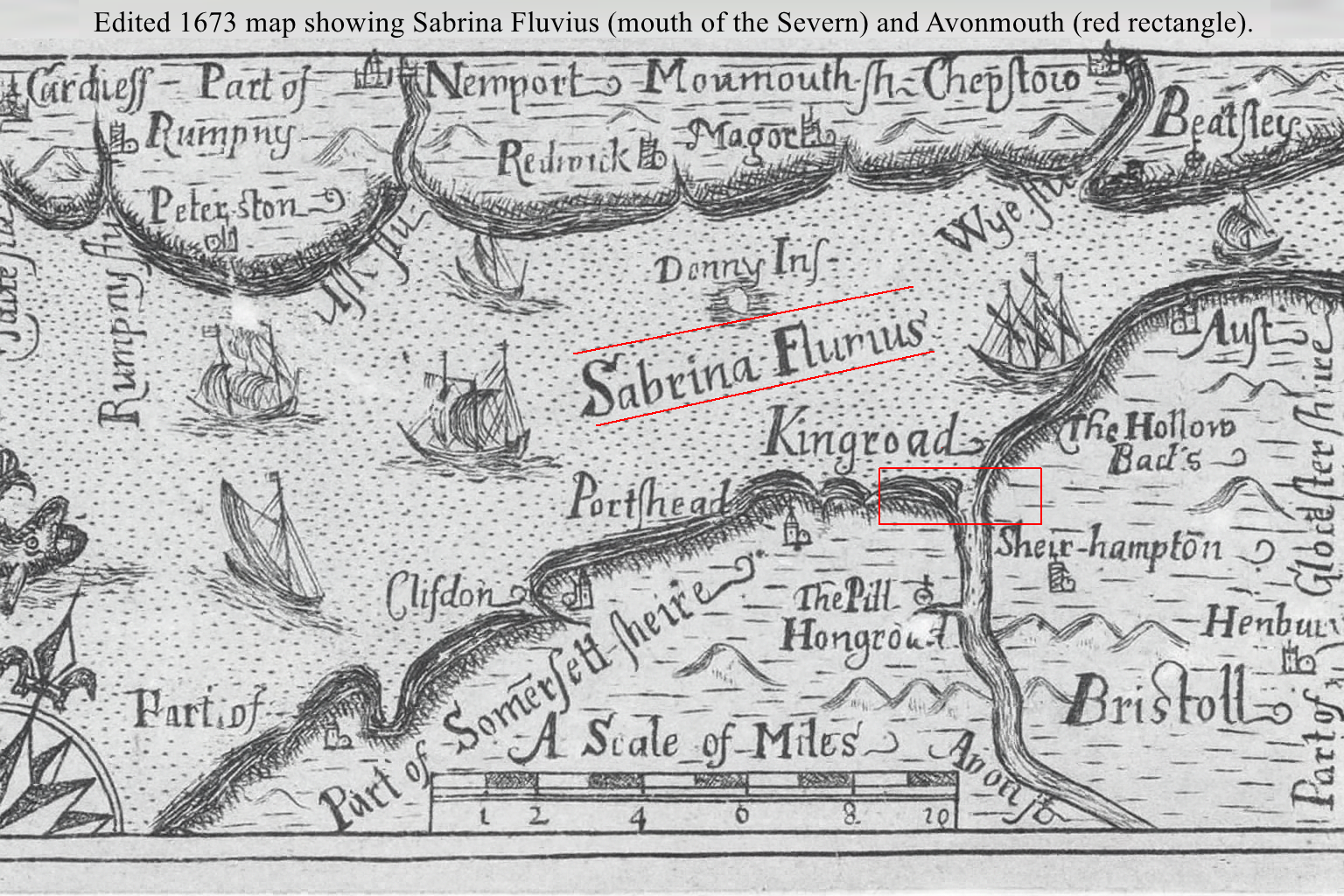
A 1673 map showing Avonmouth and surrounding areas

Avonmouth or the mouth of the River Avon was recorded as Afenemuþan in the Anglo-Saxon Chronicle under the years 915 or 918 and 1052, but it is clear from the context that the name does not refer to a settlement. References to "Afenemuþan" in the chronicles describe how Edward the Elder stationed his men there as well as at "Sæfernmuþan" (the mouth of the River Severn). The Vikings reached Anglo‑Saxon shores by sea and could travel far inland because their ships had hulls that sat high in water and required little depth to float (i.e. had a shallow draught), the Avon and Severn were rivers and thus vulnerable to Viking penetration.

In Old English therefore Afenemuþan was a compound noun made up of the word "Avon" - derived from the Common Brittonic abona, "river", which survives in the Welsh word afon [ˈavɔn], and the word muþan the dative form of muþa meaning mouth.

== History ==
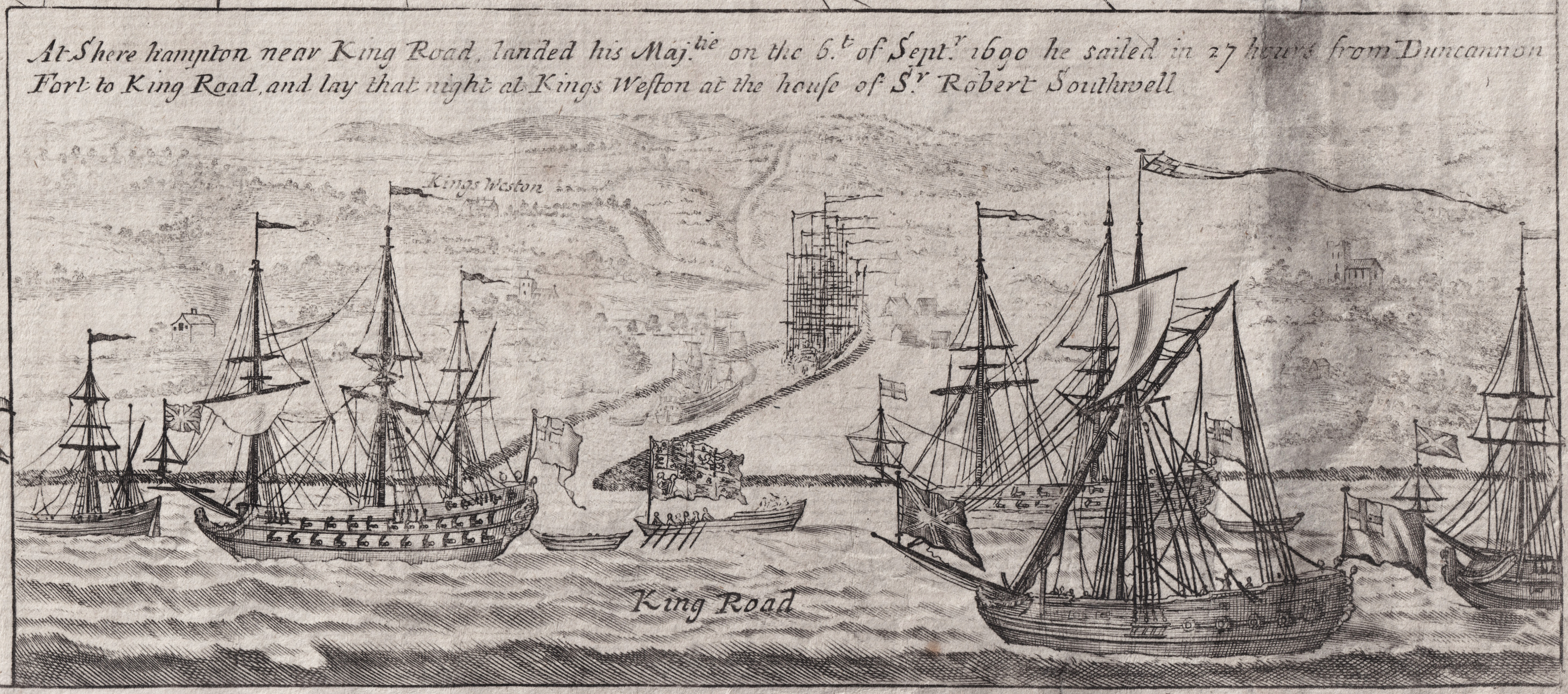
Kingroad and the mouth of the Avon, 6 September 1690

The area was historically part of the chapelry of Shirehampton, a detached part of the ancient parish of Westbury-on-Trym in Gloucestershire. Bewys Cross, a stone monument possibly dating from the 15th century, was located on the bank of the Severn close to the old mouth of the Avon. As depicted on James Millerd's 1673 map of Bristol, the main elements of the Avonmouth area in the medieval and early modern period were the Kingroad (the bay between the Avonmouth and Portishead) and the Hungroad (the anchorage in the lower Avon between Shirehampton and Pill. Both are depicted on Greenvile Collins c.1693 chart of the Bristol Channel, which includes a detail image that depicts King William III's landing at Avonmouth on 6 September 1690, following his return from the Williamite War in Ireland.

Early 19th-century maps show the area as farmland. At that time the deep-water channel of the Avon ran through the present-day site of Avonmouth Docks, and separated the mainland from a small island named Dumball Island.

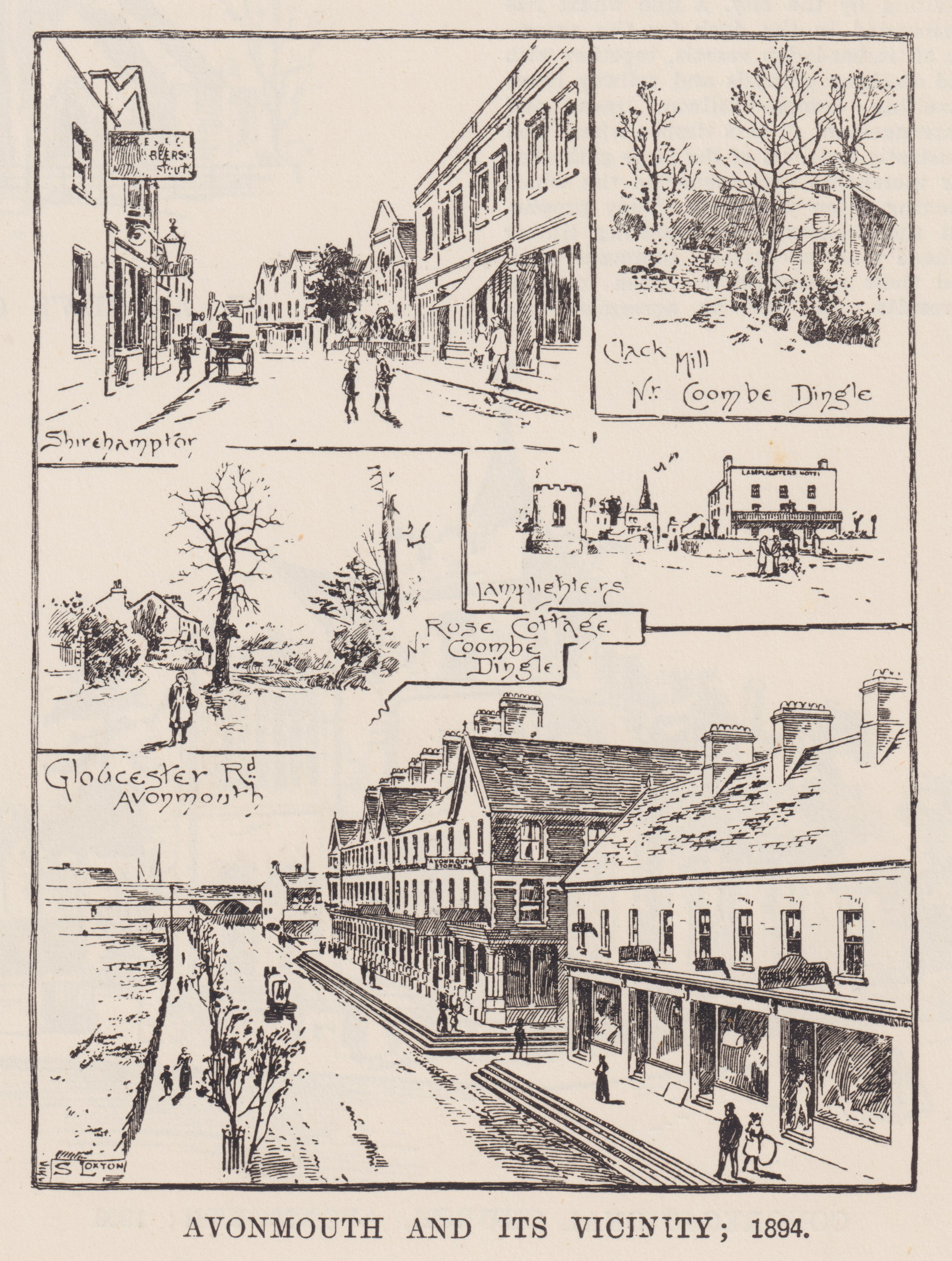
Avonmouth in 1894

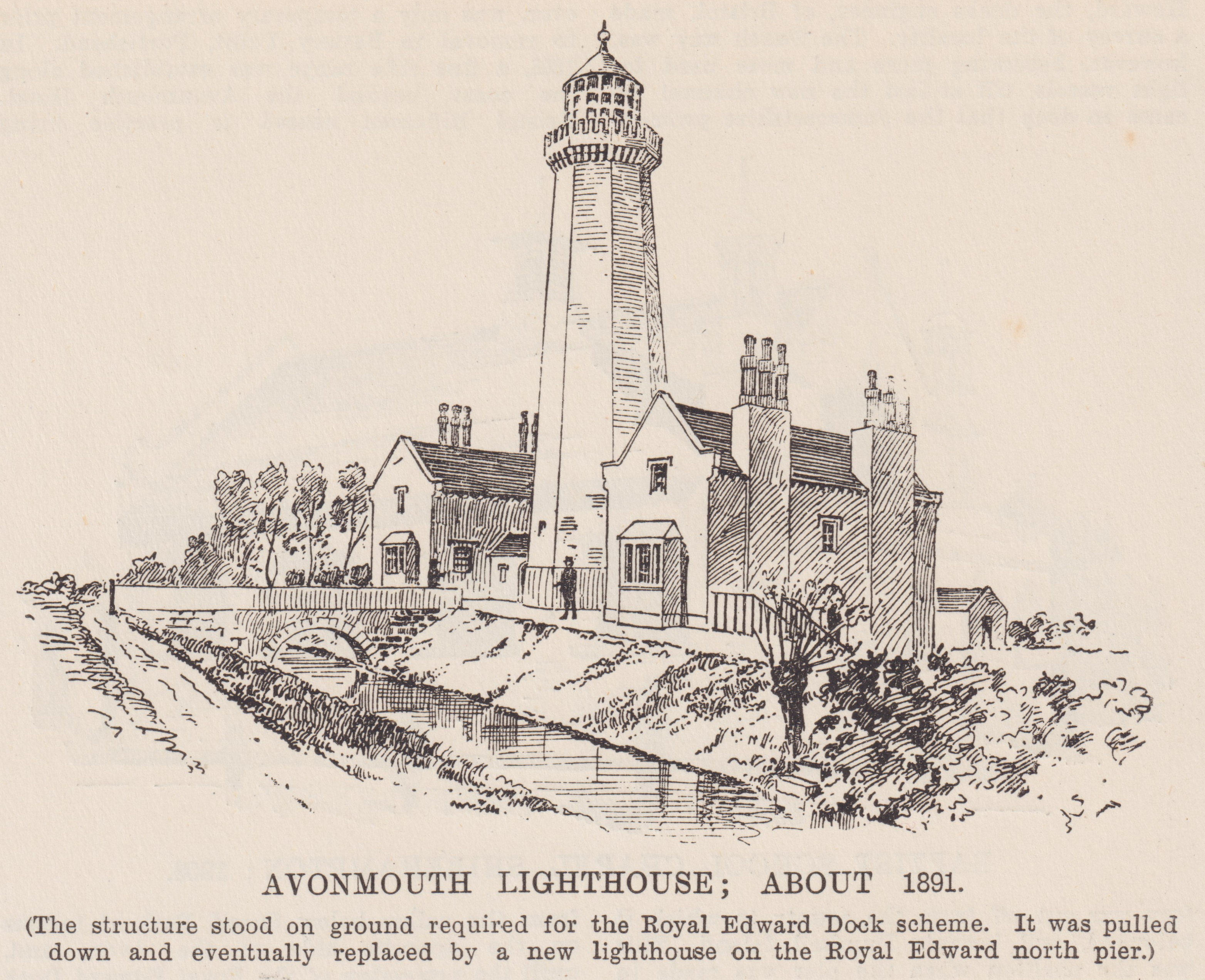
Avonmouth Lighthouse, later destroyed and replaced by a small lighthouse on the north pier.

The first development at Avonmouth was a landing stage built in 1860 by Bristol Corporation at "Avon's Mouth". The first record of the modern name was in the title of the Port and Channel Docks (Avonmouth Dock) Bill debated in Parliament in early 1863. When the Bristol Port Railway and Pier was built in 1865 the terminus station was named Avonmouth. A hotel, the Avonmouth Hotel, was opened at the same time. A small new village was built to serve the new docks, which were finally opened in 1877. Also in 1877, the BPRP line was connected to the main railway network by the Clifton Extension Railway, and a new railway station named Avonmouth Dock was opened by the docks. Bricks for the docks were supplied by the Crown Brick Works in West Town, Shirehampton, visible on the 1879 Ordnance Survey map. The Crown Brick Works were owned by Edwin Stride, with his sons Jared and Jethro (who later developed Sneyd Park), together with George Davis and William and Jarman Peters. The Crown Brick Works company was dissolved in 1886.

The new Avonmouth Dock and the original nucleus of the settlement were transferred from Gloucestershire to the City of Bristol in 1894, and the rest of the expanding settlement became part of the City in 1904.

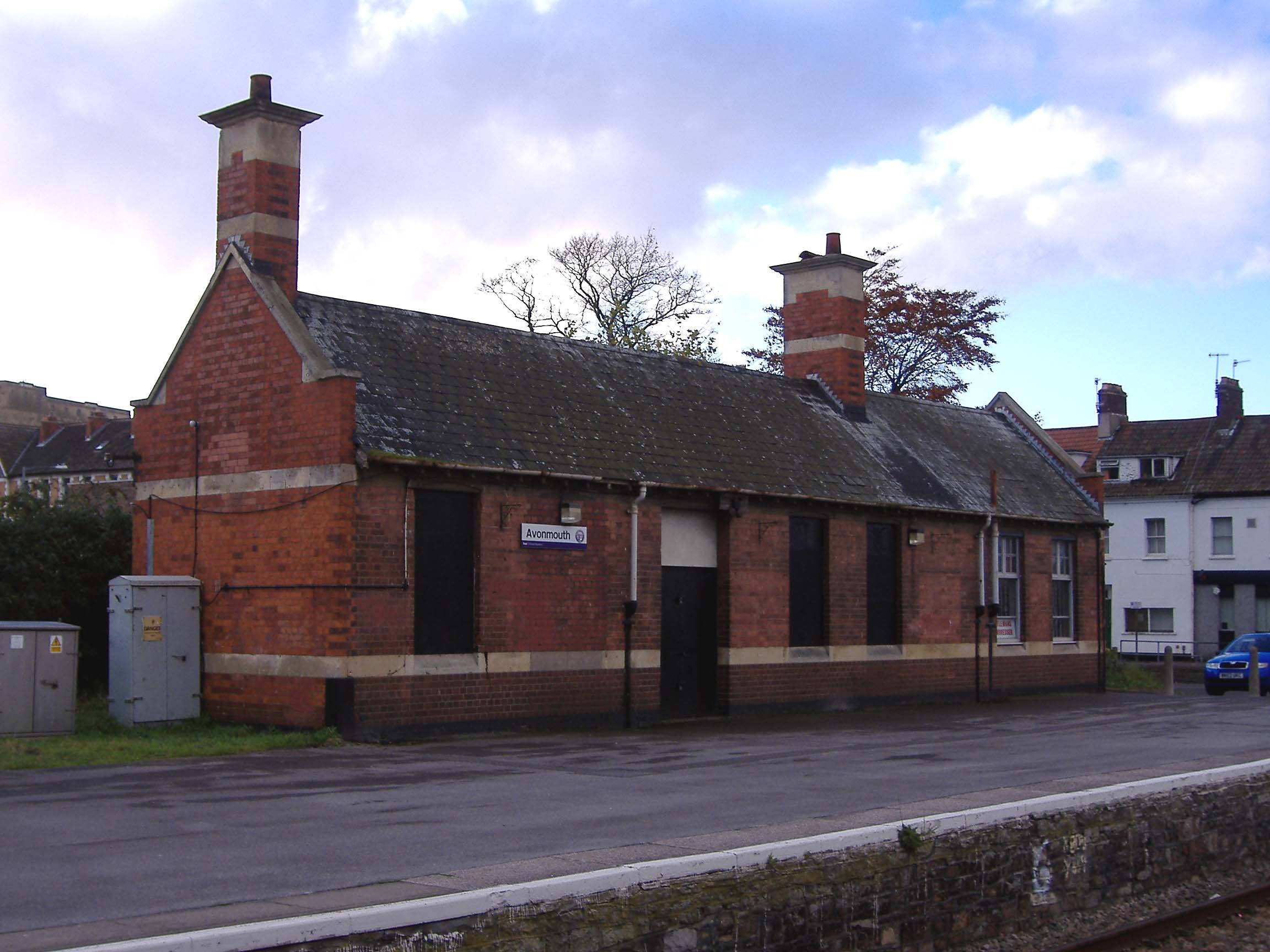
Avonmouth station

Work began in 1902 on the Royal Edward Dock, a major expansion of the docks, completed in 1908. Land required for the expansion necessitated the closure of the original station, and from 1902 all trains terminated at Avonmouth Dock station (renamed "Avonmouth" in 1966). However, the Avonmouth Hotel adjacent to the original station remained open. It provided accommodation for many Europeans emigrating to the Americas via Avonmouth, and during the First World War it housed the Women's Army Auxiliary Corps. It was finally demolished in 1926 when the Royal Edward Dock was expanded.

Between 1919 and 1926, the Portway was built, providing more direct road access to Avonmouth from Bristol.

Shirehampton had become a separate parish in 1844, and a Church of England chapel was established in the new settlement of Avonmouth late in the nineteenth century. Avonmouth became a separate parish in 1917. Avonmouth's first church, completed in 1934, was bombed by the Luftwaffe in 1941 during the Second World War, in one of the six major raids of the Bristol Blitz. It was rebuilt in 1957.

In December 1971, the M5 motorway was opened to Avonmouth, and extended south into Somerset when the Avonmouth Bridge was opened in May 1974.

On 3 December 2020, four people were killed in an explosion at the water treatment plant.

== Local places of interest ==
=== Avonmouth Sewage Works Nature Reserve ===
The 10-hectare (25-acre) Avonmouth Sewage Treatment Works is managed as a nature reserve by Wessex Water. The human-made lagoons and a pool provide a feeding and resting area for many birds including ducks such as pochard, tufted duck, teal and shoveler. The rough grassland provides a refuge for great crested newt, voles and other small mammals, which are preyed upon by kestrels and barn owls.

=== The Range Distribution Centre ===
Avonmouth is home to the largest single footprint warehouse in the United Kingdom, a 1,250,000 sq ft portal frame building operated by The Range as a distribution centre. The enormous building occupies 55 acres of land and is part of the Central Park project located close to the Severn estuary shoreline. Previously, the largest single footprint warehouse in the United Kingdom was a building operated by Amazon in Dunfermline, Scotland which covers 1,000,000 sq ft.

=== Lawrence Weston Wind Turbine ===
The Lawrence Weston Wind Turbine is located in Avonmouth near the Seabank Power Station. Standing at 150 metres (490 ft) tall, it is the tallest onshore wind turbine in England. It is owned by the community of Lawrence Weston through a charity group called Ambition Lawrence Weston, where the revenue earned from selling its generated electricity is then used given back to the community to fund projects.

== Governance ==
Avonmouth is part of the Bristol North West constituency, which elects a member of Parliament (MP).

Avonmouth and Lawrence Weston is an electoral ward electing three councillors to Bristol City Council. Apart from Avonmouth itself, the ward includes Shirehampton and part of Lawrence Weston. Shirehampton is a part of Bristol which has a medieval-founded village nucleus and contains buildings dating more than a century earlier than the earliest examples in Avonmouth. Today the pre-1893 mother parish of Shirehampton has definitive boundaries and c. 6,867 inhabitants. Shirehampton railway station provides travel to the city centre. The western end of the Lawrence Weston area crosses the boundary into the Avonmouth ward, however the majority of the area falls within the Kingsweston ward. The combined area is separated from the rest of Bristol by a small amount of green land, see buffer zones.
