= Avonmouth railway station (Bristol Port Railway and Pier) =

Disused railway station in Avonmouth, Bristol

Avonmouth
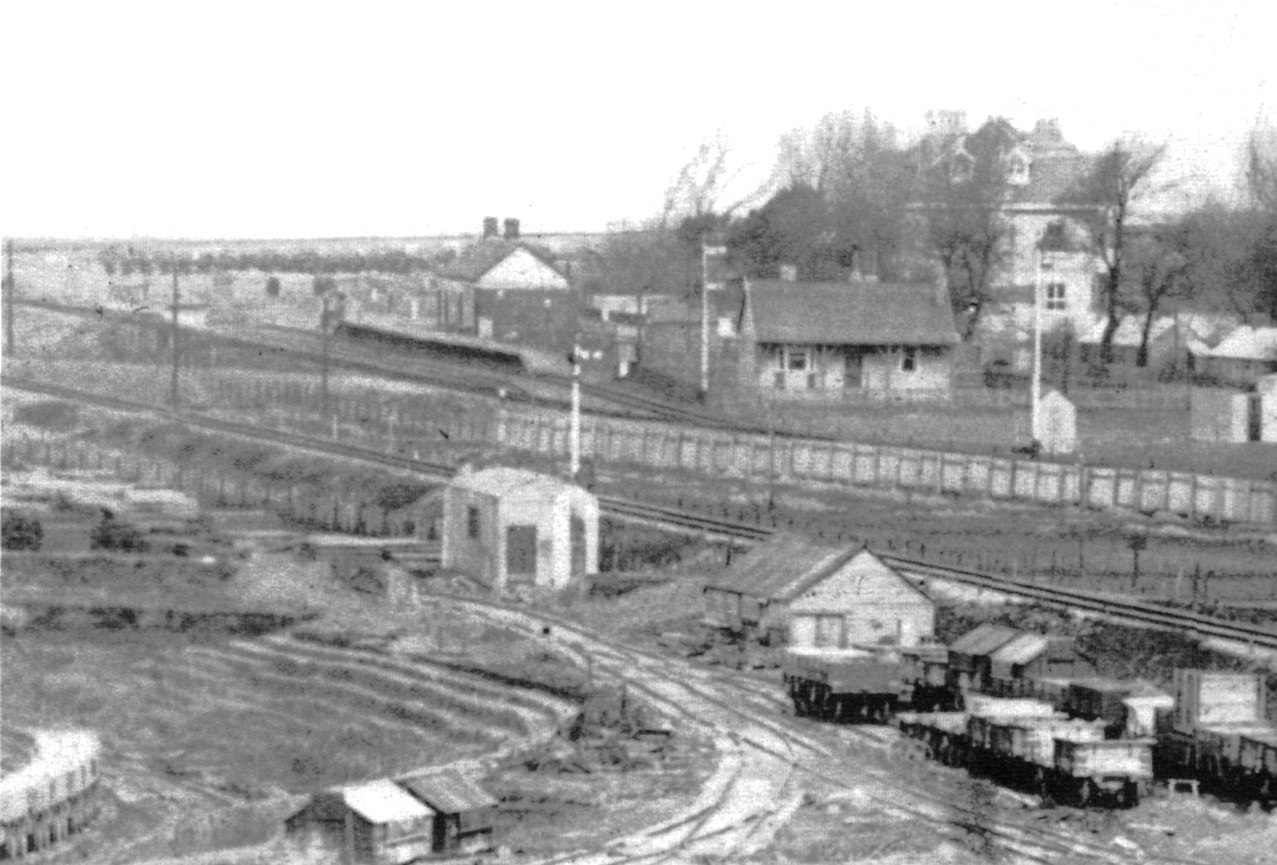
- The only known photo of the station, dated 8 March 1903, after the station was closed to the general public. The Avonmouth Hotel is on the right.

General information
- Location: Avonmouth, Bristol; England
- Coordinates: 51.5084°N 2.7045°W
- Platforms: 2

Other information
- Status: Disused

History
- Original company: Bristol Port Railway and Pier
- Pre-grouping: Great Western and Midland Railways

Key dates
- 6 March 1865: Opened
- 1 October 1902: Closed to general public
- 15 May 1903: Closed to workers' trains
Location

Avonmouth railway station was the terminus of the Bristol Port Railway and Pier, a self-contained railway which ran along the River Avon in Bristol, England. The station, which opened in 1865, was adjacent to a pier on the River Severn at Avonmouth. It had two platforms and an adjacent hotel, as well as an engine shed and water tank. The station was closed in 1902 as the land was required for the expansion of Avonmouth Docks, although it remained in use for workers' trains until 1903. The hotel continued to operate until 1926, when it too was demolished to make way for the docks. The station site is now in the middle of Avonmouth Docks.

== History ==
=== Construction ===
The station was opened on 6 March 1865 when services began on the Bristol Port Railway and Pier (BPRP), a self-contained railway owned by the Bristol Corporation. The line ran along the north bank of the River Avon in Bristol, England, to a deep water pier on the Severn Estuary at Avonmouth. The route was 4 ft 8 1/2 in (1,435 mm) standard gauge and mostly single track, with Avonmouth being the line's northern terminus, 6 miles 74 chains (11.1 km) from the southern terminus at Hotwells. (Note: Railways in the United Kingdom are, for historical reasons, measured in miles and chains. There are 80 chains to the mile.) Avonmouth had two tracks, aligned roughly north–south, with a platform on either side. The western platform was 265 feet (81 m) long, the eastern one 200 feet (61 m). The eastern platform had a booking office, and was connected by a path to the neighbouring Avonmouth Hotel. A gate led to a pontoon and floating bridge across to a 300 feet (91 m)-long pier, which opened on 3 June 1865. The western platform fell out of use early in the station's operation. The station also had an engine shed and water tank.

=== Operation and closure ===
The BPRP ran into trouble by 1871 when the terminal pier at Avonmouth became difficult to use due to a build-up of silt. With no prospect of a proper dock being funded without a connection to the national rail network, the Clifton Extension Railway (CER) was approved. This was a joint venture by the BPRP, Great Western Railway and Midland Railway. It ran from Sneyd Park Junction, south of Sea Mills, via Clifton Down, to join up with the national network at Narroways Hill Junction. The new line opened in 1877, but passenger trains from the national network terminated at Clifton Down as the link from Clifton to Sneyd Park Junction was not cleared for passenger use until 3 August 1878. Even after services were allowed to run, the Midland and Great Western Railways did not think the BPRP track was in a suitable condition and so refused to run any passenger trains beyond Clifton Down. When through services finally began operation in 1885, they did not reach the original Avonmouth terminus, instead running to Avonmouth Dock (the modern day Avonmouth station), 1 mile 62 chains (2.9 km) back down the line towards Bristol. Despite the increased traffic the BPRP suffered financially, and was taken over by the CER in 1890. A single-track, freight-only line was built past the Avonmouth railway station in 1900, linking to the Bristol and South Wales Union Railway at Pilning.

The expansion of Avonmouth Docks, and particularly the construction of Royal Edward Dock, led to the closure of Avonmouth station, as the land was required for construction. Services for the general public were withdrawn on 1 October 1902, but the station was used for unadvertised workers' trains until 15 May 1903, with the official closure the following day. After the closure of the station, all trains terminated at Avonmouth Dock. The station site is now in the middle of Avonmouth Docks.

Preceding station	Historical railways	Following station
Terminus	Bristol Port Railway and Pier (1865-1877)	Shirehampton
Terminus	Bristol Port Railway and Pier (1877-1890)	Avonmouth Dock
Terminus	Great Western Railway; Clifton Extension Railway (1890-1902)	Avonmouth Dock

=== The Avonmouth Hotel ===
When the station opened, the surrounding area was almost entirely rural, and would remain so throughout the station's existence. Indeed, in 1902, John L Dunk wrote in The Railway Magazine that he could not think why trains ran only to an inn and a few cottages. The area did however see some development, as the Avonmouth Hotel was built adjacent to the station, as well as 10 acres (40,000 m^{2}) of pleasure gardens. The gardens boasted a concert hall, as well as an ornamental lake, and hosted fêtes at Easter and Whitsun. Despite excursion trains to the gardens, they were not viable financially.

The hotel remained in business after the station's closure, albeit isolated from public transport. It provided accommodation for many Europeans emigrating to the Americas via Avonmouth, and during the First World War it housed the Women's Army Auxiliary Corps. It was finally demolished in 1926 when the Royal Edward Dock was expanded.

== See also ==
- Avonmouth railway station, formerly Avonmouth Dock station, renamed in 1966.
