= St Andrews Road railway station =

Railway station in Bristol, England

St Andrews Road
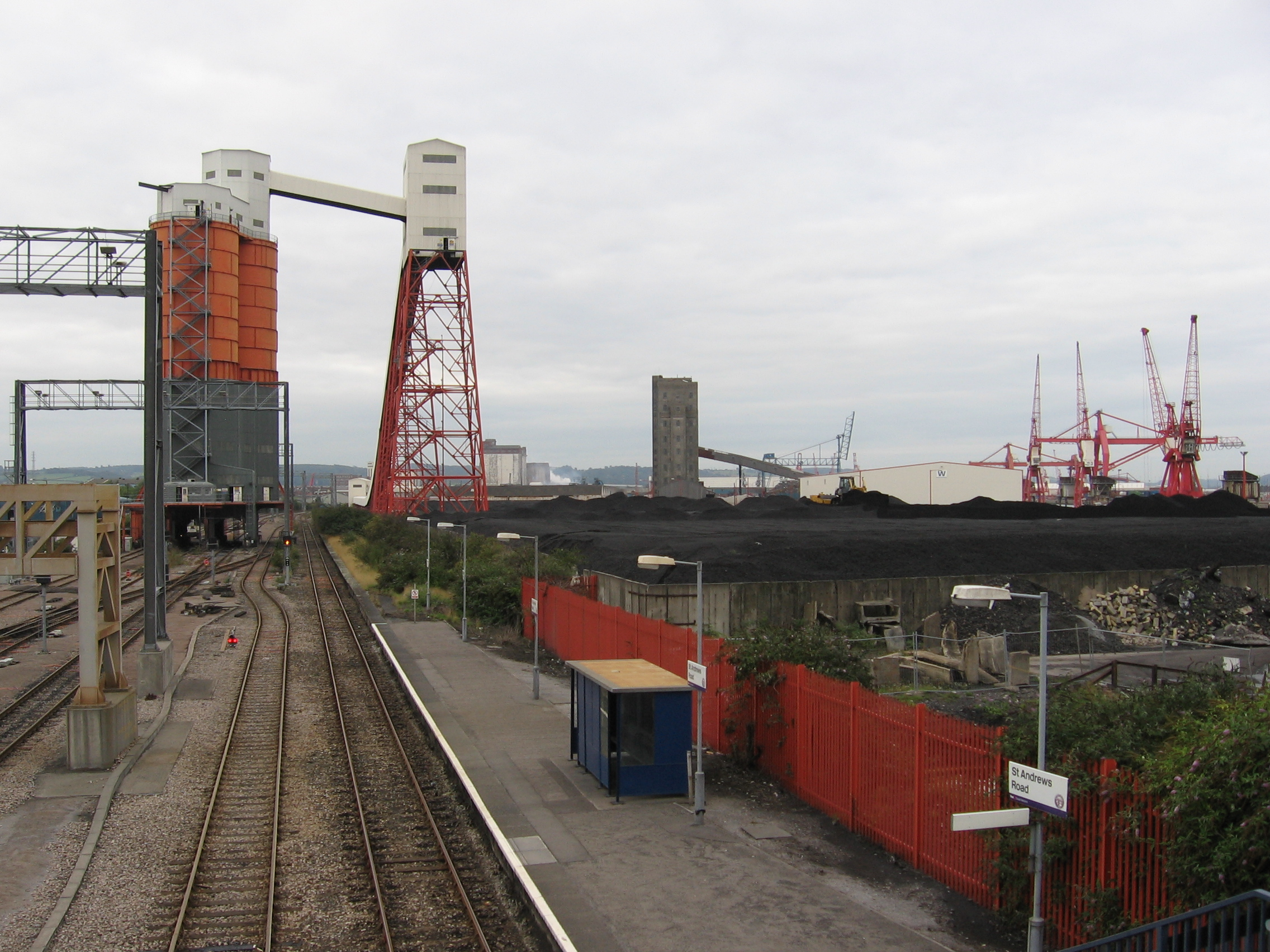

General information
- Location: Avonmouth, Bristol; England
- Coordinates: 51.5132°N 2.6962°W
- Grid reference: ST517795
- Manager: Great Western Railway
- Platforms: 1

Other information
- Station code: SAR
- Classification: DfT category F2

Key dates
- 1 March 1917: Opened for workmen only
- 13 November 1922: Closed
- 30 June 1924: Reopened as a public station

Passengers
- 2021/22: ▲7,164
- 2022/23: ▲17,322
- 2023/24: ▲34,554
- 2024/25: ▲81,974
- 2025/26: ▼71,678
Location
Notes
- Passenger statistics from the Office of Rail and Road

St Andrews Road railway station serves a large industrial area near to Avonmouth, Bristol, England. This station is 15 miles 37 chains (24.9 km) from Bristol Temple Meads on the Severn Beach Line, between Severn Beach and Avonmouth. The station and all trains serving it are operated by Great Western Railway.

== History ==
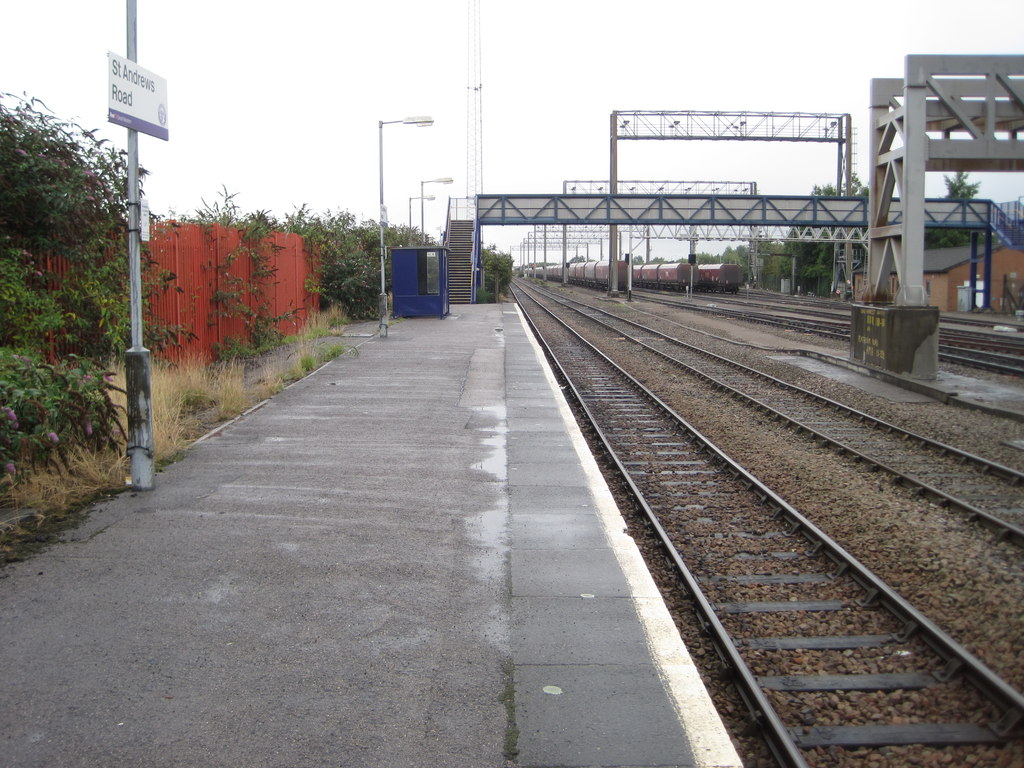
The station in 2013. Only the track through the platform is used for the passenger trains; the rest are freight lines.

The station was opened in March 1917 for workmen, but closed on 13 November 1922. It reopened on 30 June 1924 as a public station.

DB Cargo UK used to operate coal trains from the sidings at the station to the Aberthaw power stations in Wales on an 'as required' basis before it closed down in March 2020.

== Location ==
The location of the station within an industrial part of Bristol is referenced in Tiny Stations by Dixe Wills:

The footbridge is its sole lifeline to the world — without it the platform would be truly adrift on a no-man's-sea of gantries, antennae, oil containers, half-hidden warehouses, structures whose proper names and functions are known only to those who read obscure trade magazines. This is no scene of post-industrial devastation, merely current industrial devastation.

== Facilities ==
The station has only a shelter, a help point and cycle storage spaces. As there are no facilities to purchase tickets, passengers must buy one in advance, or from the guard on the train.

== Passenger volume ==
For many years, it has been the least used railway station in Bristol.

Passenger volume at St Andrews Road
	2004–05	2005–06	2006–07	2007–08	2008–09	2009–10	2010–11	2011–12	2012–13	2013–14	2014–15	2015–16	2016–17	2017–18	2018–19	2019–20	2020–21	2021–22	2022–23	2023–24	2024–25	2025–26
Entries and exits	4,969	8,008	5,518	3,183	3,582	3,942	4,328	6,072	9,910	13,376	11,184	7,374	6,522	5,516	4,724	5,728	4,910	7,164	17,322	34,554	81,974	71,678

The statistics cover twelve month periods that start in April.

== Services ==
For many years the station had an infrequent service in each direction, but this was increased to hourly in the December 2021 timetable change.

All services at St Andrews Road are operated by Great Western Railway mainly using Class 165 and 166 Networker Turbo DMUs and the occasional Class 158 Express Sprinter DMU.

The typical off-peak service in trains per hour is:

- 1 tph to Bristol Temple Meads
- 1 tph to Severn Beach

Some services also extend beyond Bristol Temple Meads, including one on weekdays to Salisbury, and one train on Sundays to Exeter St Davids.

Preceding station	National Rail	Following station
Severn Beach	Great Western Railway Severn Beach Line	Avonmouth
	Disused railways	
Avonmouth	Great Western Railway Henbury Loop Line	Chittening Platform Line open, station closed

== Cultural references ==
St Andrew's Road station was featured in the Channel 4 series Paul Merton's Secret Stations Season 1 Episode 2 broadcast on 8 May 2016. This series features British comedian Paul Merton visiting various request stop railway stations around Britain.

== See also ==
- Great Western Railway
- List of all UK railway stations
- Public transport in Bristol

== Bibliography ==
- Quick, Michael (2023). Railway Passenger Stations in Great Britain: A Chronology (PDF) (5th ed.). London: Railway and Canal Historical Society.
- Wills, Dixe (2014). Tiny Stations (Paperback, 1st reprint ed.). Basingstoke: AA Publishing. ISBN 978-0-7495-7732-2.
