= Public transport in Bristol =

The majority of public transport users in the Bristol Urban Area are transported by bus, although rail has experienced growth and does play an important part, particularly in peak hours.

Since 2017 the Mayor of the West of England and the West of England Combined Authority have the primary responsibility for organising public transport in the Bristol area.

== Bus ==
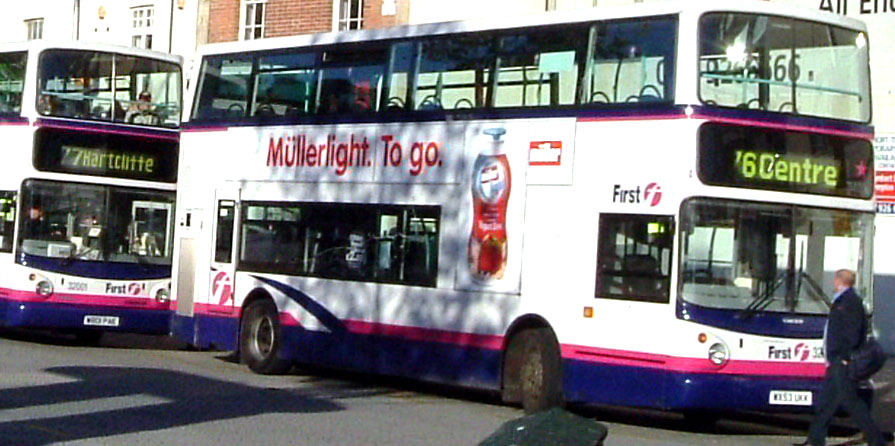
Livery of First West of England buses in Bristol

The Bristol bus station, in Marlborough Street, was opened in 1958. It was redeveloped in 2006

There are three main bus companies operating across the Greater Bristol area. They are First West of England, Stagecoach South West and Big Lemon. They provide services around Bristol and into South Gloucestershire and North Somerset. National Express, Flixbus and Megabus provide services to destinations such as London, Plymouth, Glasgow and Swansea.

MetroBus, a bus rapid transit system, began in 2018 and consists of four routes as of August 2024, originally operated by Bristol Community Transport, now First West of England

== Rail ==
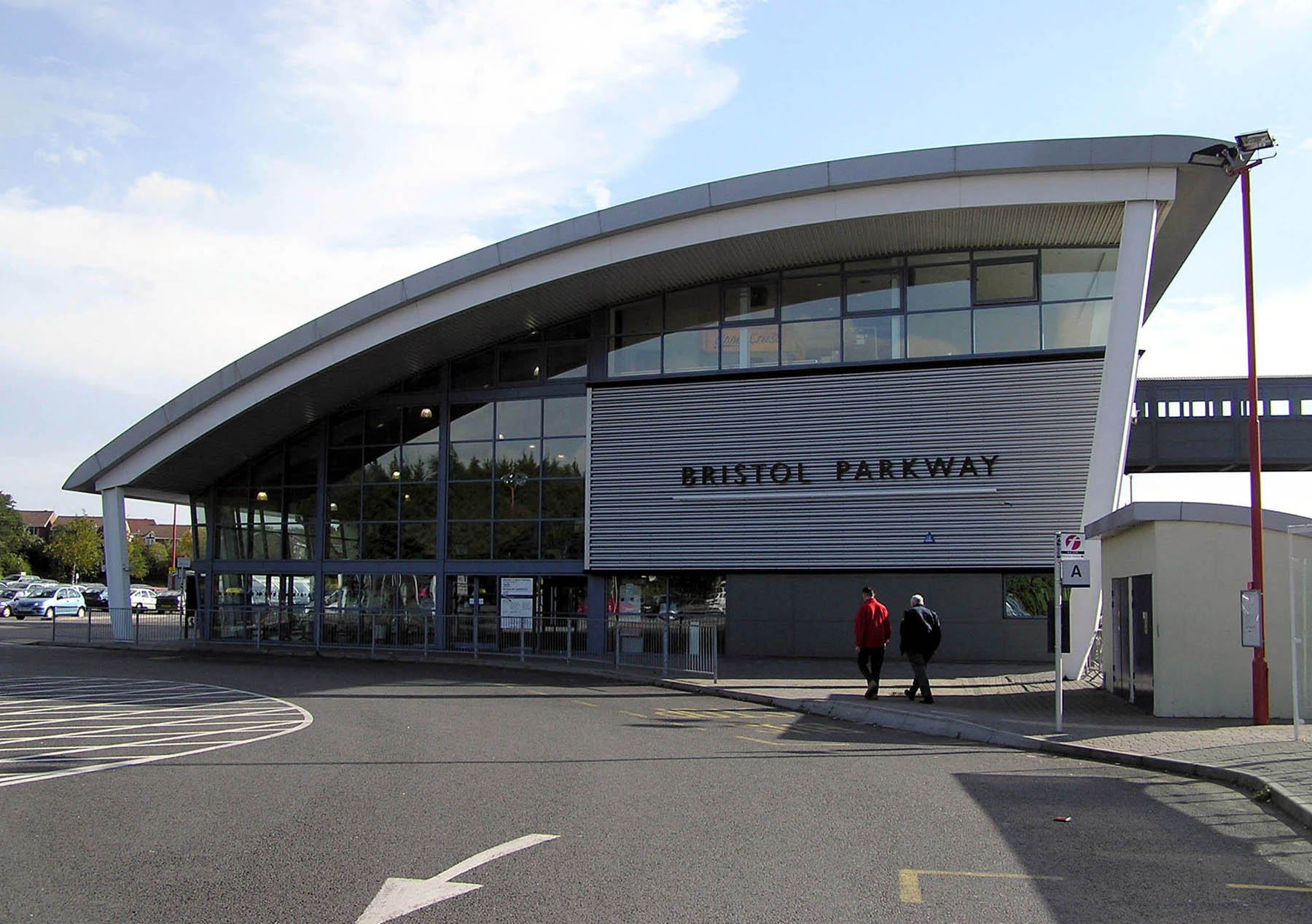
Bristol Parkway railway station

The main railway stations in Bristol are Bristol Temple Meads, near the city centre, and Bristol Parkway in the northern suburb of Stoke Gifford. Although the latter is in the Bristol urban area, it is in South Gloucestershire. There are services to UK destinations from both Temple Meads and Parkway stations. There are also smaller stations across Bristol on different railway lines, including the Severn Beach Line, South Wales Main Line, Cross-Country Route, Great Western Main Line and Wessex Main Line.

Journey time to Cardiff is around 45–60 minutes and to London Paddington around 90 minutes.

There are three private rail companies that operate across the Greater Bristol area. They are Greater Western Railway, CrossCountry and South Western Railway. Great Western Railway operate all the local and regional services and intercity services between London Paddington and South Wales/Southwest England that pass through or terminate at Bristol. CrossCountry run cross-country intercity services that serve Bristol on routes between Southwest England and the Midlands, North of England and Scotland.

There are several local, suburban rail routes throughout Bristol but many have either been closed or seen massively reduced services. The Severn Beach line which runs from Temple Meads to Severn Beach is regarded as a particularly attractive route.

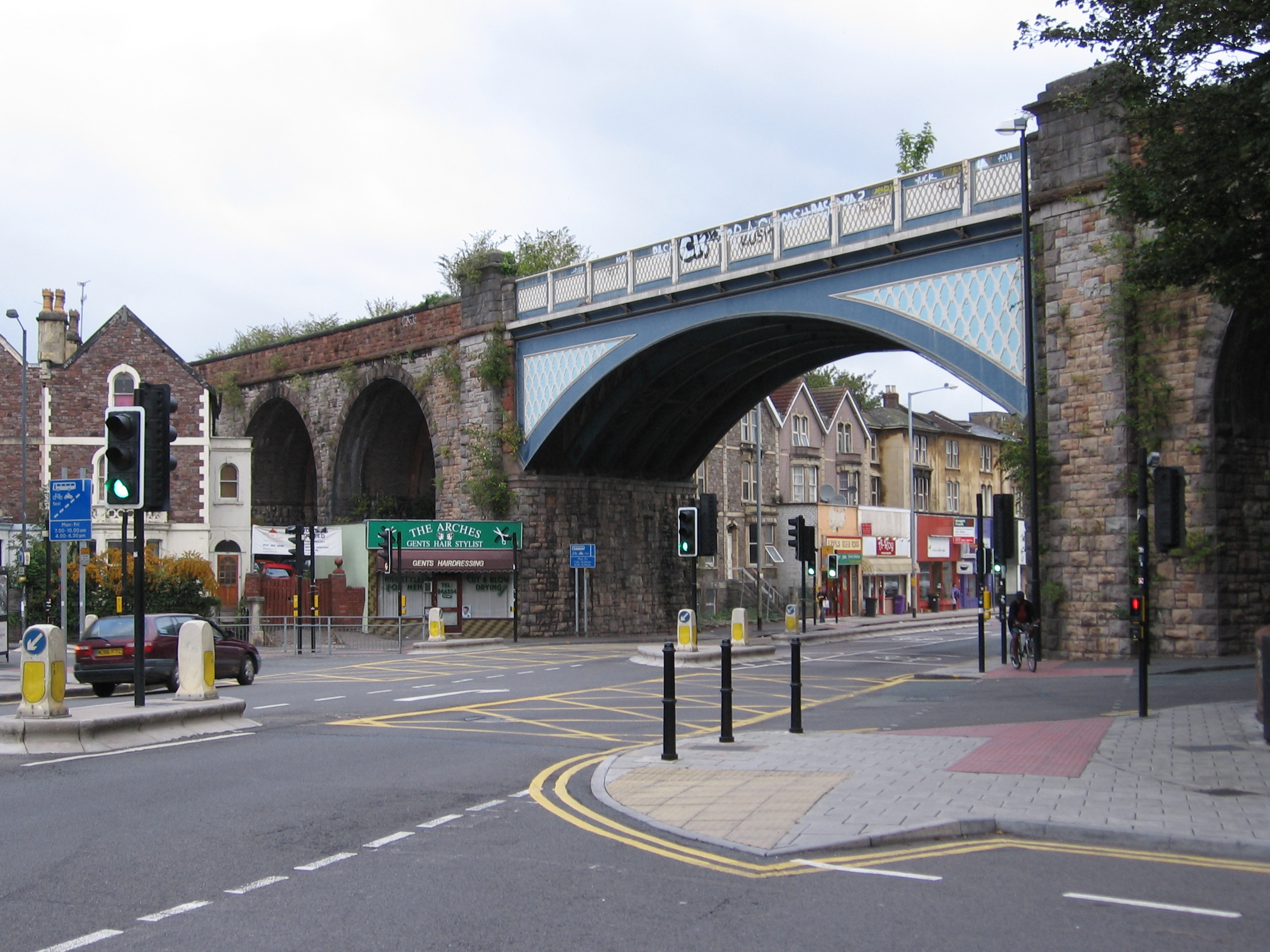
Part of the viaduct between Redland and Montpelier stations.

Following a successful campaign by Friends of Suburban Bristol Railways, the Severn Beach Line began to be served by an increased frequency from May 2008. It is hoped this will pave the way for better services across the conurbation. An additional train now operates on the line meaning services average around every 40 minutes. Fares are set over two zones, and the trip from Bristol Temple Meads to Severn Beach is £3.00 return. There is, for the first time, a Sunday service to Avonmouth. The result is a service that can actually be used to commute to Bristol centre from outlying areas. Information has been improved at all the stations, from a push-button link to a computer-generated voice link, to real-time display screen. There has been a dramatic increase in passenger numbers, giving rise to complaints about not be able to buy tickets for through train journeys from the onboard train crew.

=== MetroWest ===
MetroWest is a current initiative in the West of England area to improve local rail services by reopening disused rail lines and stations and improving existing services. Phase One includes reopening the Portishead railway line to passenger traffic and improving services to the Severn Beach Line and Bath Spa. Phase Two will see the Henbury railway line reopen, along with half-hourly services between Weston-super-Mare and Yate. The phases were due to open in 2019 and 2021 respectively. However, as of February 2025, the Portishead Line has yet to reopen, and the Henbury Loop project has yet to be completed either, although Ashley Down has been reopened.

The West of England Local Enterprise Partnership also produced a Key Principles Report in November 2015 discussing future potential transport projects for the West of England region, including new rail transit based options referred to as MetroWest++. The options outlined include reopening the Thornbury Branch Line, a Yate to Bath route, the use of tram train technology, a link to the city centre and a connection to Bristol Airport.

=== Proposed light rail or rapid transit ===
In November 2016, the West of England Local Enterprise Partnership began a consultation process on their Transport Vision Summary Document, outlining potential light rail/tram routes from the city centre to Bristol Airport, the eastern and north west fringes of the city, and a route along the A4 road to Bath. By 2017, this proposal had changed to a mass transit network with potential for underground sections, linking the city centre with the northern and eastern fringes of the city and the airport.

== Water ==
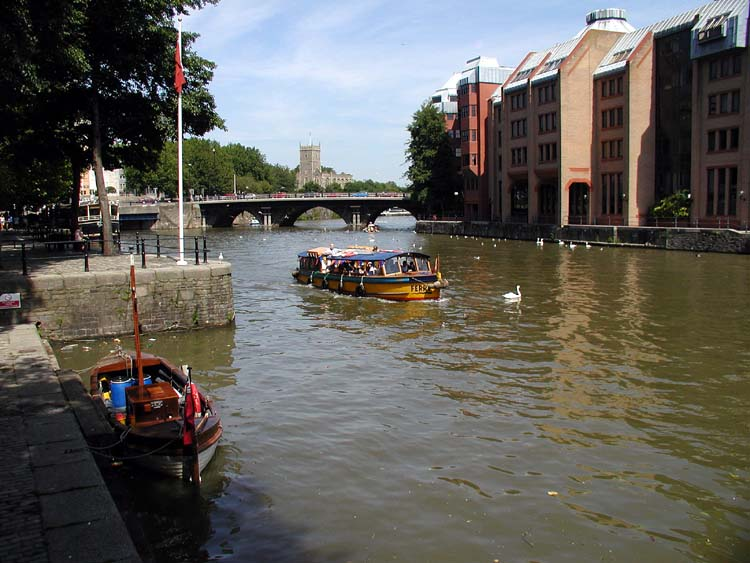
A ferry boat passes the Welsh Back landing stage, with Bristol Bridge in the background

Bristol Ferry Boats operates passenger ferry boat services on Bristol Harbour in the centre of Bristol. Services are operated for the leisure market to and from both the city centre and Bristol Temple Meads railway station. Services are provided by a fleet of yellow and blue painted ferry boats.

In 2010 the city council supported commuter services formerly operated by the Bristol Ferry Boat Company were transferred to a new operator, Number Seven Boat Trips. This company also operates daily tourist services.

The Bristol Packet operates guided tours throughout the year around the harbour, and in the tourist season also downriver to Avonmouth and upstream to Beese's Tea Gardens, the Chequers Inn at Hanham and via the Kennet and Avon Navigation to Bath.

Landing stages used by all operators include:

- City Centre
- SS Great Britain
- Bristol Marina
- Mardyke
- Hotwells-Pumphouse (for Hotwells)
- Welsh Back
- Castle Park
- Temple Quay (for Bristol Temple Meads railway station)
