= Redland =

Redland or Redlands may refer to:

== Places ==
=== Australia ===
- Redland City, Brisbane, Queensland
  - Electoral district of Redlands

=== Canada ===
- Redland, Alberta
- Redlands, Newfoundland and Labrador

=== United Kingdom ===
- Redland, Bristol
  - Redland railway station
- Redland, Orkney, a place in Orkney
- Redlands, Reading
- Redlands, West Wittering, West Sussex
- Redlands, Wiltshire
- Redland Hundred, a hundred in the county of Dorset

=== United States ===
- Redland, Alabama
- Redland, Florida
- Redland, Maryland
- Redland, Oklahoma
- Redland, Oregon
- Redland, Texas
- Redland, Virginia
- Redlands, California
- Redlands, Colorado
- Redlands (Circleville, Ohio), listed on the National Register of Historic Places in Pickaway County
- Redlands (Covesville, Virginia), listed on the National Register of Historic Places in Albemarle County

== Schools ==
- University of Redlands, a private university in Redlands, California
- Redlands Community College, a community college in El Reno, Oklahoma
- Redlands, Cremorne, an independent secondary school in Cremorne, New South Wales

== Other uses ==
- Charles Redland (Carl Gustaf Mauritz Nilsson, 1911–1994), Swedish jazz musician
- Doyle Redland, the fictional newsreader on The Onion Radio News
- Redland Football Club, a Brisbane, Australia, based sports club
- Redland plc, a former British building materials business
- Redland RDF Application Framework, an open-source software toolkit for the Resource Description Framework
- The Redland, American hip-hop and R&B duo
- Redlands Airfield, former grass-strip airfield near Swindon, England

== See also ==
- Tanah Merah District ('Red Land'), Kelantan
