= Bristol County Ground =

Cricket ground

- Fry's Ground, Nevil Road

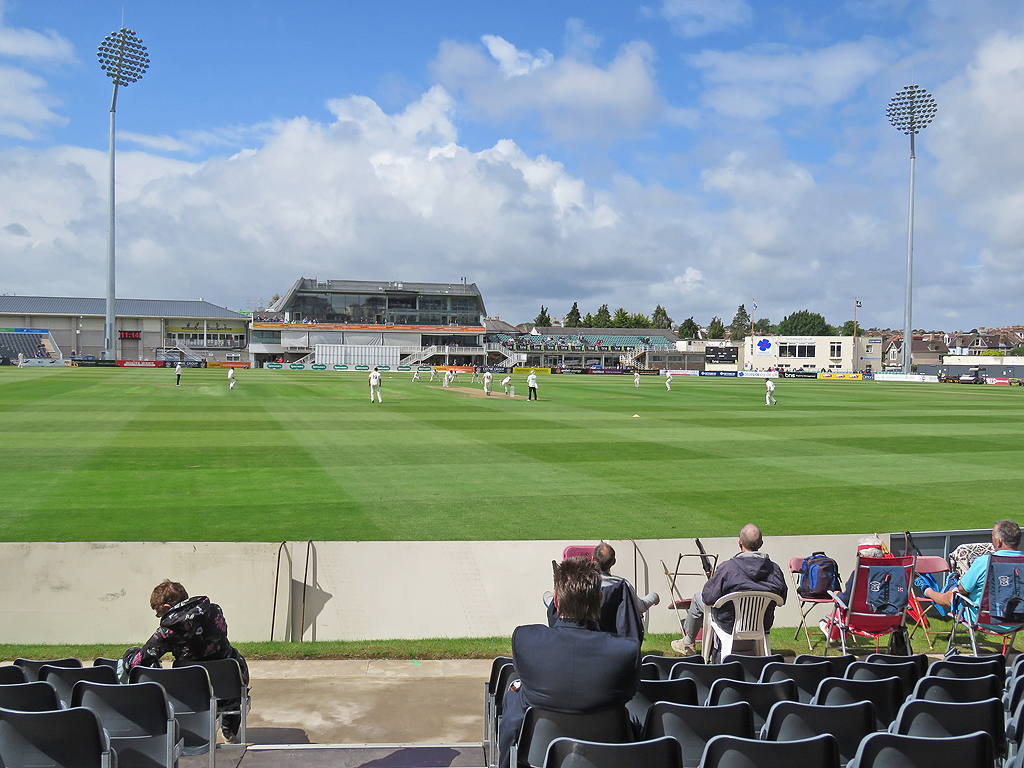
- Interactive map of Bristol County Ground

Ground information
- Location: Ashley Down, Bristol
- Country: England
- Coordinates: 51°28′38″N 2°35′03″W
- Establishment: 1889
- Capacity: 8,000; 17,500 for internationals
- End names
- Ashley Down Road End Bristol Pavilion End

International information
- First men's ODI: 13 June 1983: New Zealand v Sri Lanka
- Last men's ODI: 29 September 2024: England v Australia
- First men's T20I: 28 August 2006: England v Pakistan
- Last men's T20I: 8 June 2025: England v West Indies
- Only women's Test: 16–19 June 2021: England v India
- First women's ODI: 21 July 1984: England v New Zealand
- Last women's ODI: 3 July 2024: England v New Zealand
- First women's T20I: 25 June 2011: England v Australia
- Last women's T20I: 30 May 2026: England v India

Team information
Gloucestershire	(1889 – present)
- As of 29 September 2024; Source: CricInfo

The Bristol County Ground (also known as Nevil Road and currently known as the Seat Unique Stadium for sponsorship reasons) is a senior cricket venue in Bristol, England. It is in the district of Ashley Down. The ground is home to Gloucestershire County Cricket Club.

== History ==
Initially known as Ashley Down Ground, it was bought in 1889 by W. G. Grace and has been home to Gloucestershire ever since. It was sold to local confectionery firm J. S. Fry & Sons and renamed Fry's Ground. The club bought the ground back in 1933 and it reverted to its original name. It was sold again in 1976, this time to Royal & Sun Alliance who renamed the ground the Phoenix County Ground for eight years before changing to The Royal & Sun Alliance County Ground until the ground was again bought by the club and took it up its current title.

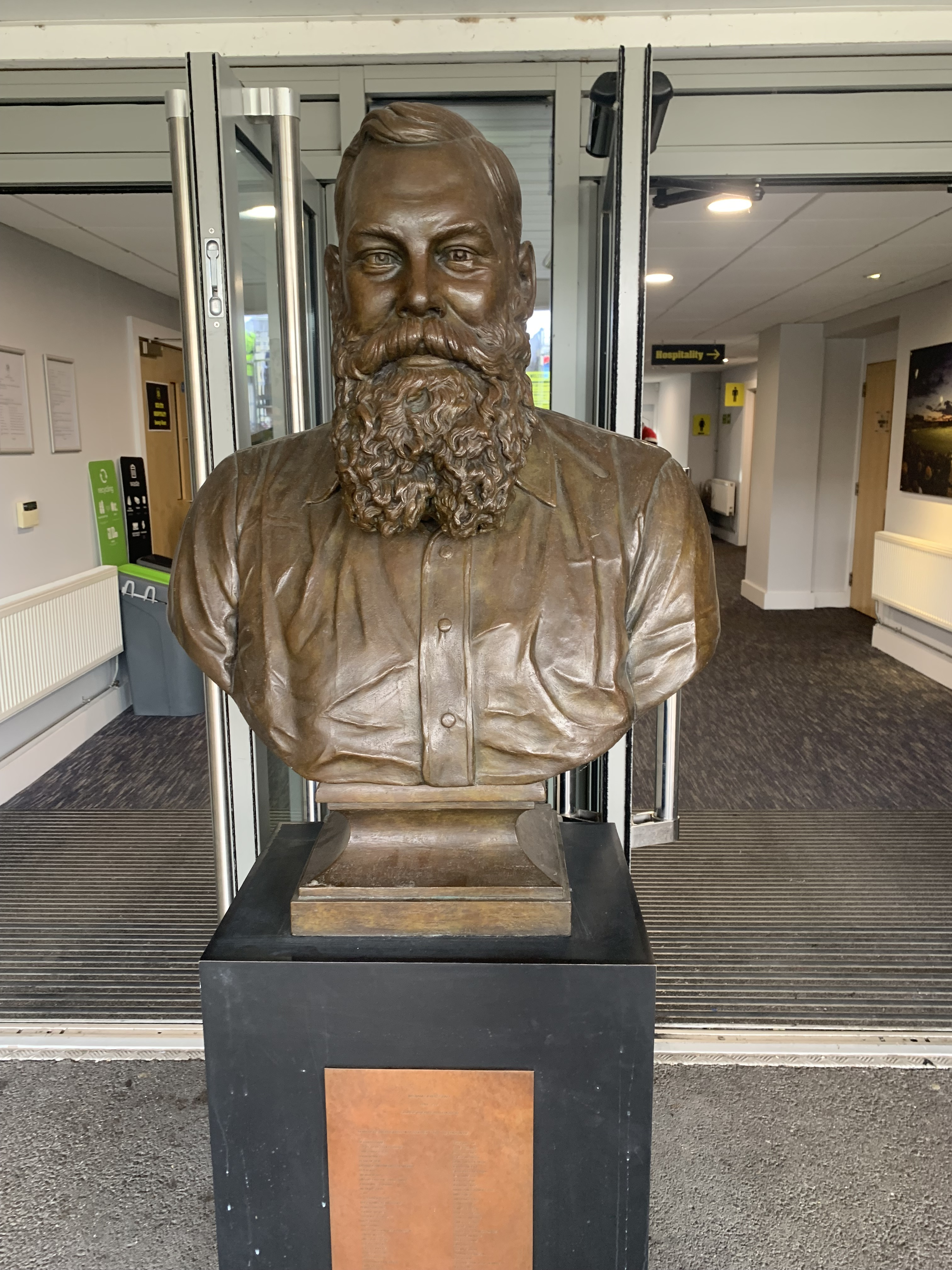
Bust of WG Grace outside the Bristol Pavilion

The ground hosts One Day Internationals, usually one per year, with the addition of temporary seating to increase the ground's capacity. England faced India in 2018 and Pakistan in 2019 at the ground. In addition, three matches were scheduled to be played at the ground as part of the 2019 Cricket World Cup. Of these three, two were abandoned without a ball being bowled due to bad weather. The only match played was Australia v Afghanistan – a match Australia won by 7 wickets.

The ground has long boundaries in comparison to most county cricket clubs.

The former concrete roof over the public terraces, which has now been demolished, was formed from eight hyperbolic-paraboloid umbrellas each approximately 30 square feet (2.8 m^{2}), designed by T. H. B. Burrough in 1960.

== Redevelopment ==
In July 2009, Gloucestershire C.C.C. announced plans to redevelop the ground into a 20,000-capacity stadium, with an aim to retaining one day international status. The ground now includes a world class media centre and conference facilities. To help fund the project, student accommodation is included in the development. In March 2010, Bristol City Council gave the go-ahead for the new ground.

The following year, the club revised its plans due to concerns from residents on the adjacent Kennington Avenue over permanent stands at the boundary of their property. The permanent capacity was raised to 7,500 (8,000 including the semi-permanent Hammond Roof) with temporary seating increasing capacity to 17,500, but with other changes still implemented: new pavilion, new conference facilities and the construction of new stands (including the demolition of the Jessop stand and Tavern and the rebuilding of the Mound stand to a fixed capacity of 4,500) and 147 apartments in three blocks. These plans were approved on 31 May 2012 and development began in October 2012. The Bristol Pavilion opened in August 2013. Permanent floodlights were approved by Bristol City Council in April 2015, which were installed ready for the start of the 2016 season and which allowed the club to continue to host international matches, including three at the 2019 Cricket World Cup.

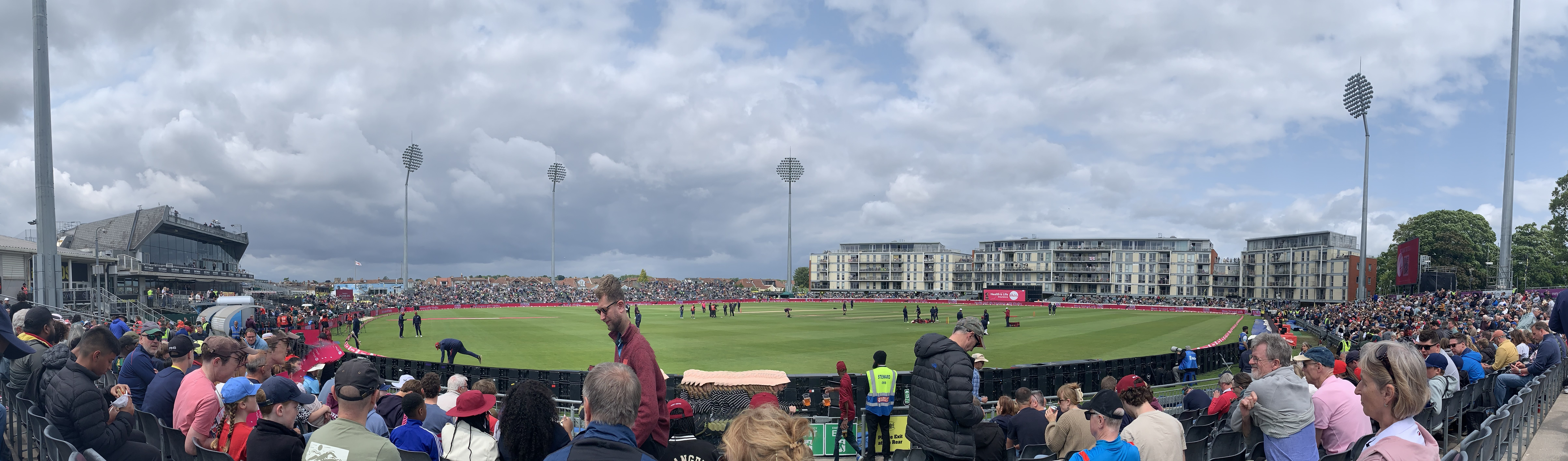
Panorama of the Bristol County Ground in 2025

== Transport connections ==
Ashley Down railway station opened on 28th September 2024 and is 0.3 miles from the stadium. Montpelier on the Severn Beach line is under 1 mile (1.6 km) from the ground. Mainline stations Bristol Temple Meads and Bristol Parkway are 2.5 miles (4.0 km) and 3.8 miles (6.1 km), respectively, from the ground.

== International centuries ==
=== One-Day International centuries ===
The following table summarises the One-Day International centuries scored at Bristol County Ground.

No.	Score	Player	Team	Balls	Opposing team	Date	Result
1	140*	Sachin Tendulkar (1/2)	India	101	Kenya	23 May 1999	Won
2	104*	Rahul Dravid	India	109	Kenya	23 May 1999	Won
3	102	Ricky Ponting	Australia	101	England	10 June 2001	Won
4	113	Sachin Tendulkar (2/2)	India	101	Sri Lanka	11 July 2002	Won
5	106	Andrew Flintoff	England	121	New Zealand	4 July 2004	Lost
6	102	Moeen Ali	England	57	West Indies	24 September 2017	Won
7	151	Imam-ul-Haq	Pakistan	131	England	14 May 2019	Lost
8	128	Jonny Bairstow	England	93	Pakistan	14 May 2019	Won
9	107*	Ben Duckett	England	78	Ireland	26 September 2023	No result

=== T20 International centuries ===
There has only been one T20 International century at this venue.

No.	Score	Player	Team	Balls	Opposing team	Date	Result
1	100*	Rohit Sharma	India	56	England	8 July 2018	Won

=== Women's One-Day International centuries ===
The following table summarises the women's One-Day International centuries scored at Bristol County Ground

No.	Score	Player	Team	Balls	Opposing team	Date	Result
1	104	Meg Lanning (1/2)	Australia	98	England	23 July 2015	Won
2	106*	Suzie Bates	New Zealand	109	Sri Lanka	24 June 2017	Won
3	178*	Chamari Atapattu	Sri Lanka	143	Australia	29 June 2017	Lost
4	152*	Meg Lanning (2/2)	Australia	135	Sri Lanka	29 June 2017	Won
5	147	Sarah Taylor	England	104	South Africa	5 July 2017	Won
6	148	Tammy Beaumont	England	145	South Africa	5 July 2017	Won
7	106	Poonam Raut	India	136	Australia	12 July 2017	Lost
8	107	Sophia Dunkley	England	93	South Africa	15 July 2022	Won

== See also ==
- List of cricket grounds in England and Wales
