= New Eastern Villages =

Suburban expansion of Swindon, England

Coordinates: 51.577°N 1.708°W

- Strategic area of the NEV

- Location within Wiltshire
- Unitary authority: Borough of Swindon
- Ceremonial county: Wiltshire
- Region: South West
- Country: England
- Sovereign state: United Kingdom
- Post town: Swindon
- Postcode district: SN3
- Dialling code: 01793
- Police: Wiltshire
- Fire: Dorset and Wiltshire
- Ambulance: South Western
- UK Parliament: East Wiltshire Swindon North

New Eastern Villages (NEV) is the development name for a large eastward expansion of Swindon, Wiltshire, England. Under construction since the early 2020s, it is planned to eventually comprise 8,000 new homes, 40 hectares for employment, transport improvements, a new secondary school and primary schools, together with retail, health, community and leisure facilities, including a new district centre. It is the largest strategic allocation within the adopted Swindon Borough Local Plan 2026.

The NEV masterplan is made up of nine areas: Foxbridge, Great Stall East, Great Stall West, Lotmead, Lower Lotmead, Redlands, Rowborough, Symmetry Park (commercial), Upper Lotmead and an expansion of South Marston village. The land allocated for the development lies east of the A419 primary route and is planned to push the Swindon urban area up to the Oxfordshire county border. The greater part of its area lies south of the A420, the primary route between Swindon and Oxford; the part to the north of the A420 includes South Marston and Rowborough.

The majority of the development area falls within the civil parishes of South Marston and Wanborough; a rural buffer will be retained to preserve the distinct identity of the latter. Small sections also lie in the Bishopstone, Highworth and Stratton St Margaret civil parishes.

An express bus route will link part of the area to Swindon town centre, and a park-and-ride site with 1,000 spaces will be provided in Great Stall East. The abandoned Wilts & Berks Canal crossed the area from south to north-east on its way to join the Thames near Abingdon, and the line of the canal is protected to allow for its potential future reinstatement.

== Settlements ==
The New Eastern Villages masterplan divides the new estate into a series of distinct villages and urban expansion projects.

| Area | Notes |
|---|---|
| Great Stall East | Education Campus, incorporating primary, secondary and 16-18 education facilities. Transport interchange with new Park & Ride facility. |
| Great Stall West | District centre, including retail, leisure and health facilities, and 2.5 hectares of additional employment land. |
| Foxbridge | Indicative route of Wilts & Berks Canal passes through this site. |
| Upper Lotmead | Construction commenced in August 2024. |
| Lower Lotmead | Indicative route of Wilts & Berks Canal passes through this site. |
| Lotmead | |
| Redlands | Former site of Redlands Airfield. The first residential area in the NEV strategic area to be built, construction commenced in 2022. |
| Rowborough | |
| South Marston expansion | Expansion of existing village. Construction commenced in 2025. |
| Symmetry Park | Commercial and industrial area which includes a large Amazon warehouse. The first area in the NEV strategic area to be built, construction began in April 2017. |
