= Stapleton Road railway station =

Railway station in Bristol, England

Stapleton Road
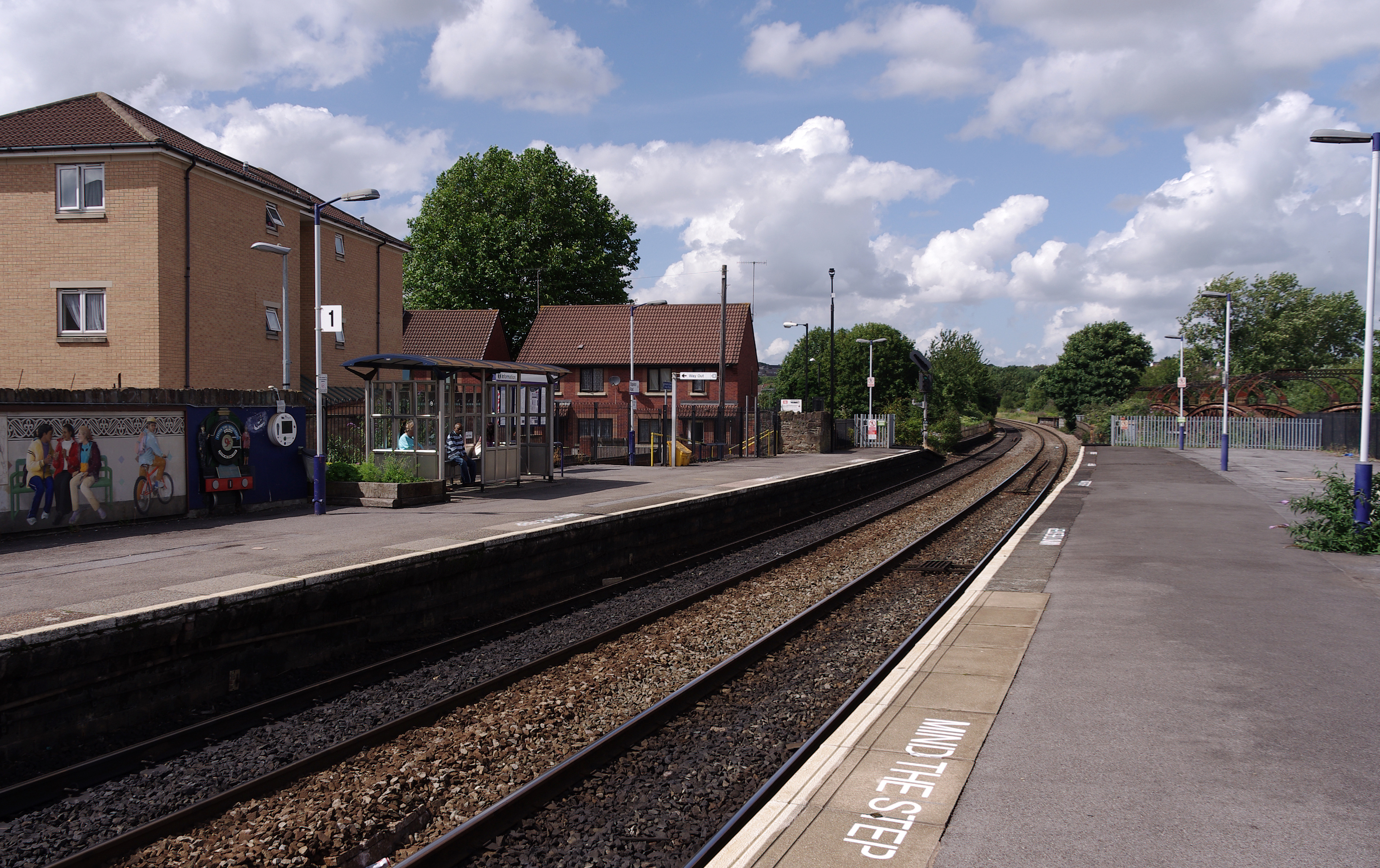

General information
- Location: Easton, Bristol; England
- Coordinates: 51.4675°N 2.5661°W
- Grid reference: ST607743
- Manager: Great Western Railway
- Platforms: 2
- Tracks: 4

Other information
- Station code: SRD
- Classification: DfT category F2

History
- Original company: Bristol and South Wales Union Railway
- Pre-grouping: Great Western Railway
- Post-grouping: Great Western Railway

Key dates
- 8 September 1863: Opened
- 1874: Second platform opened
- 1888: Third and fourth platforms opened
- 29 November 1965: Closed to goods traffic
- 1984: Reduced to two platforms

Passengers
- 2021/22: ▲0.148 million
- 2022/23: ▲0.212 million
- 2023/24: ▲0.274 million
- 2024/25: ▲0.305 million
- 2025/26: ▲0.345 million
Location
Notes
- Passenger statistics from the Office of Rail and Road

Stapleton Road railway station is on the Severn Beach Line and Cross Country Route, serving the inner-city district of Easton in Bristol, England. It is 1.6 miles (2.6 km) from Bristol Temple Meads. Its three letter station code is SRD. The station has two platforms, four running lines and minimal facilities. It is managed by Great Western Railway, the seventh company to be responsible for the station, and the third franchise since privatisation in 1997. They provide all train services at the station, the standard service being two trains per hour along the Severn Beach Line and an hourly service between Bristol Temple Meads and Filton Abbey Wood.

The station was opened in 1863 by the Bristol and South Wales Union Railway, with a single track and platform. The line was doubled in 1874 when the Clifton Extension Railway opened, then expanded to four tracks and platforms in 1888. There were buildings on all platforms and a goods yard to the north. Stapleton Road became one of Bristol's busiest stations, but service levels reduced significantly in the 1960s when reversing trains at Bristol Temple Meads became common. The goods facilities were closed in 1965, staff were withdrawn in 1967 and the line was reduced to two tracks in 1984.

In 2018, two additional running lines were added to increase capacity as part of the 21st-century modernisation of the Great Western Main Line. The line was also due to be electrified, but this has now been deferred until the next control period, which runs from 2019 to 2024.

== Description ==
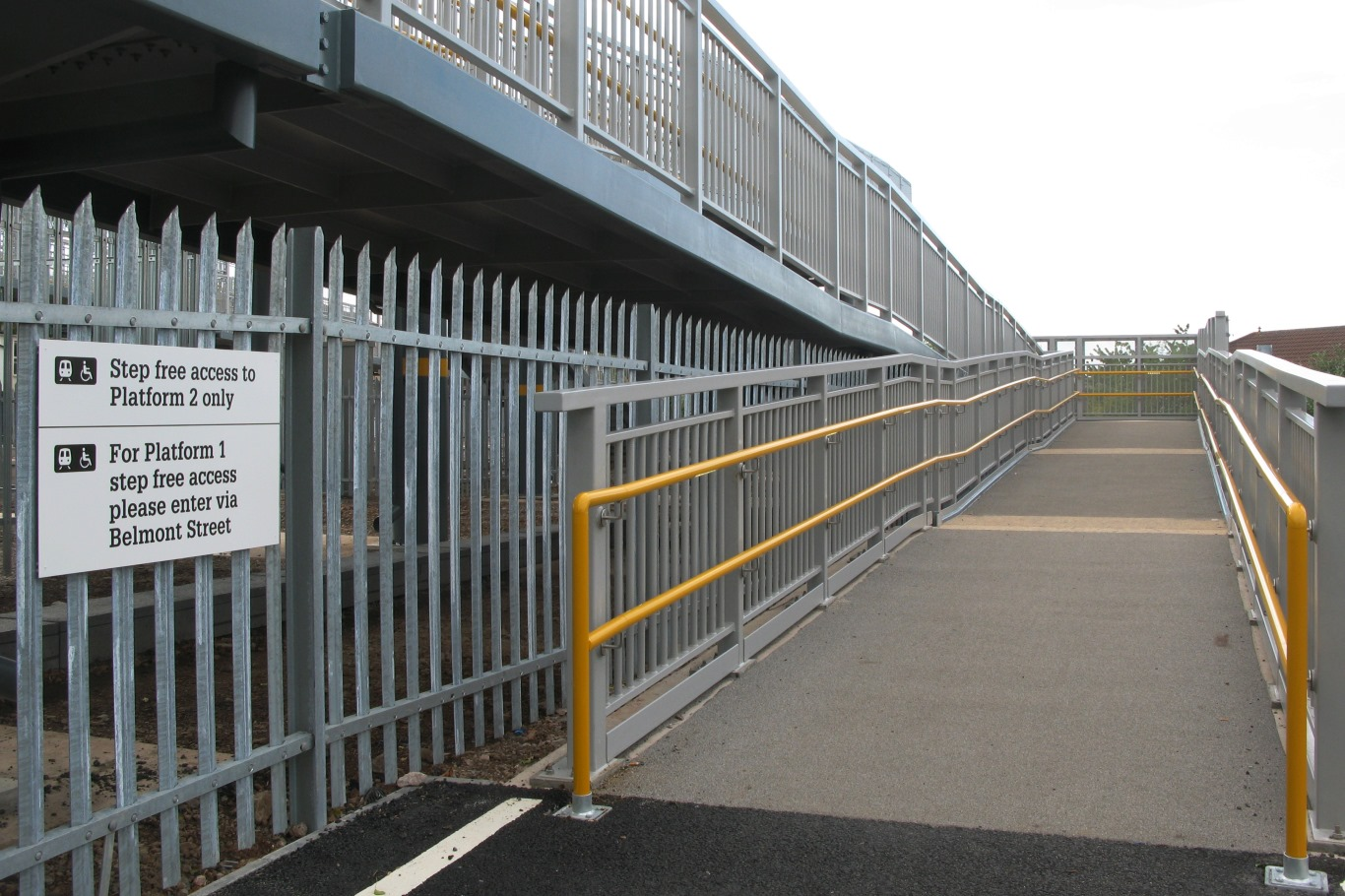
The new footbridge at Stapleton Road opened in 2019 providing step-free access throughout the station

Stapleton Road railway station is in the Easton area of Bristol. The surrounding area is primarily residential, with the M32 motorway to the north of the station, and an industrial and commercial area north of that. The station is named after the A432 Stapleton Road just north of the station. The station can be accessed by Belmont Street to the west, an unnamed access road to the east, or by a set of steps from Stapleton Road. Access to the southbound platform is via a slope of gradient greater than 1 in 12. The station is on the Cross Country Route between Bristol Temple Meads and Bristol Parkway, and on the Severn Beach Line from Bristol Temple Meads to Severn Beach. It is 1 mile 50 chains (2.6 km) from Bristol Temple Meads. (Note: Railways in the United Kingdom are, for historical reasons, measured in miles and chains. There are 80 chains to the mile.) Directly to the north of the station is a bridge over the A432, then a bridge over the M32, then Narroways Hill Junction, where the Severn Beach Line diverges from the Cross Country Route. The next station north along the Cross Country Route is Filton Abbey Wood, the next station north along the Severn Beach Line is Montpelier, and the next station south is Lawrence Hill.

The station is on an alignment of 150 degrees, curving towards the east. There are two active platforms: the western platform, platform 1, serves northbound trains; the eastern platform, platform 2, serves southbound trains. Platform 1 is 216 metres (236 yd) in length, and platform 2 211 metres (231 yd), but both have the southern 100 metres (110 yd) fenced off. The southern end of the platforms bridge the residential street St Mark's Road. Platform 2 is part of an "island" platform, the other face of which served the northbound "up fast" line through the station, which was removed in 1984 along with the southbound "down fast" and fourth platform which served it. Access between the platforms is via an open, stepped footbridge.

As of 2018, facilities at the station are minimal – there is a metal and glass shelter and a row of seats on the northbound platform. The station is completely unstaffed, and there are no facilities for buying tickets. There are customer help points, giving next train information for both platforms. There is no car park or taxi rank, and the nearest bus stop is 120 metres (130 yd) away on the A432 Stapleton Road. There are eight bicycle stands on the platform. A mural depicting local life and history is painted on the wall of platform 1.

The line through Stapleton Road has a speed limit of 60 miles per hour (97 km/h) northbound and 75 miles per hour (121 km/h) southbound. The loading gauge is W8, and the line handles over 15 million train tonnes per year.

== Services ==
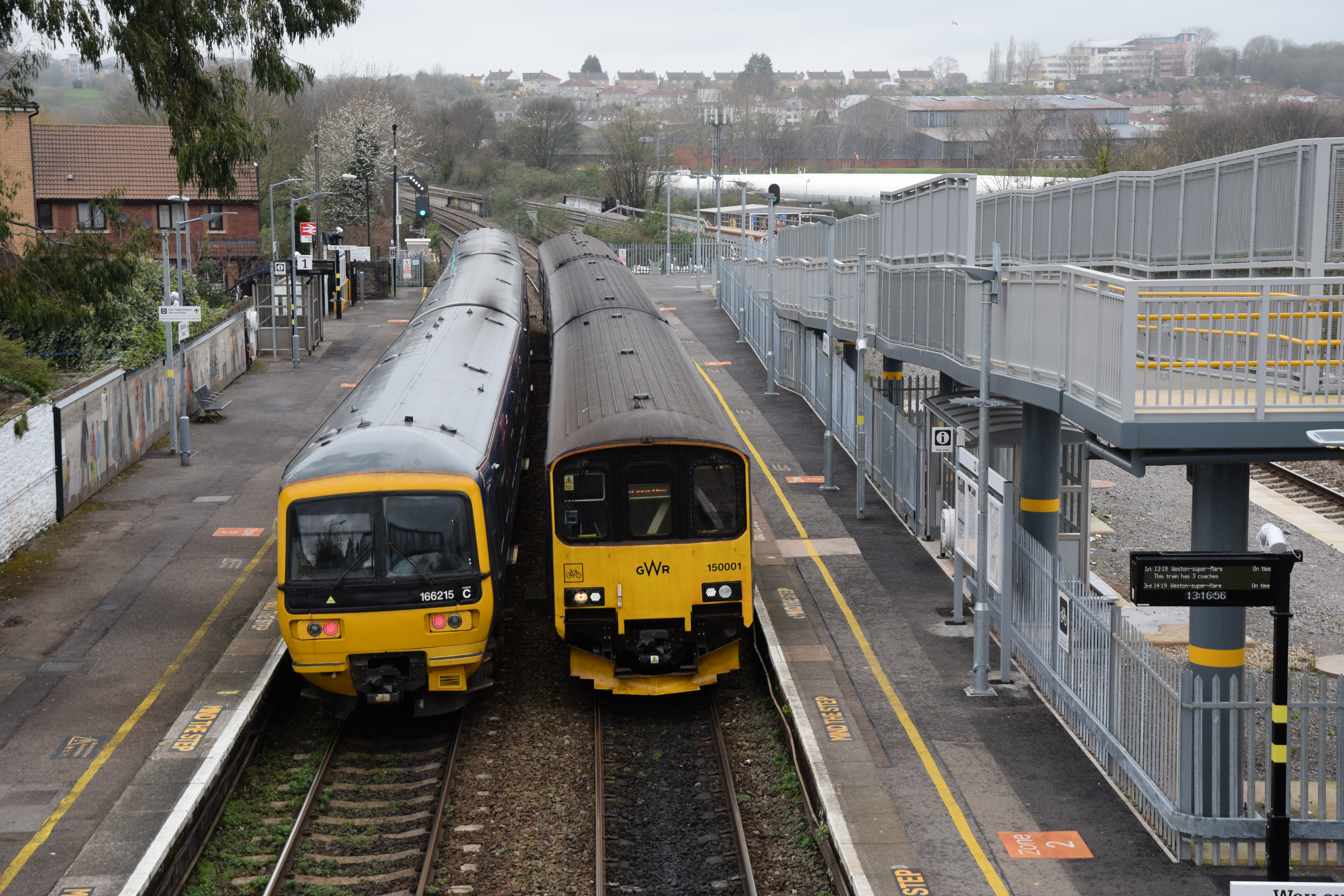
Class 166 and Class 150 units at Stapleton Road

All services at Stapleton Road are operated by Great Western Railway, using Class 150 Sprinter, Class 158 Express Sprinter and Class 166 Turbo diesel multiple units.

The typical off-peak service in trains per hour is:

- 3 tph to Bristol Temple Meads, of which 1 continues to Weston-super-Mare
- 1 tph to Filton Abbey Wood
- 2 tph to Avonmouth, of which 1 continues to Severn Beach

During peak hours, the station is also served by a number of services to Bristol Parkway, Cardiff Central and Taunton.

On Sundays, the services to Avonmouth and Severn Beach are reduced to hourly. Southbound, a single afternoon service continues beyond Bristol to Exeter St Davids via Weston-super-Mare.

Express services, operated by CrossCountry, pass through the station but do not stop.

Preceding station	National Rail	Following station
Ashley Down	Great Western Railway Cross Country Route	Lawrence Hill
Montpelier	Great Western Railway Severn Beach Line	Lawrence Hill

== History ==
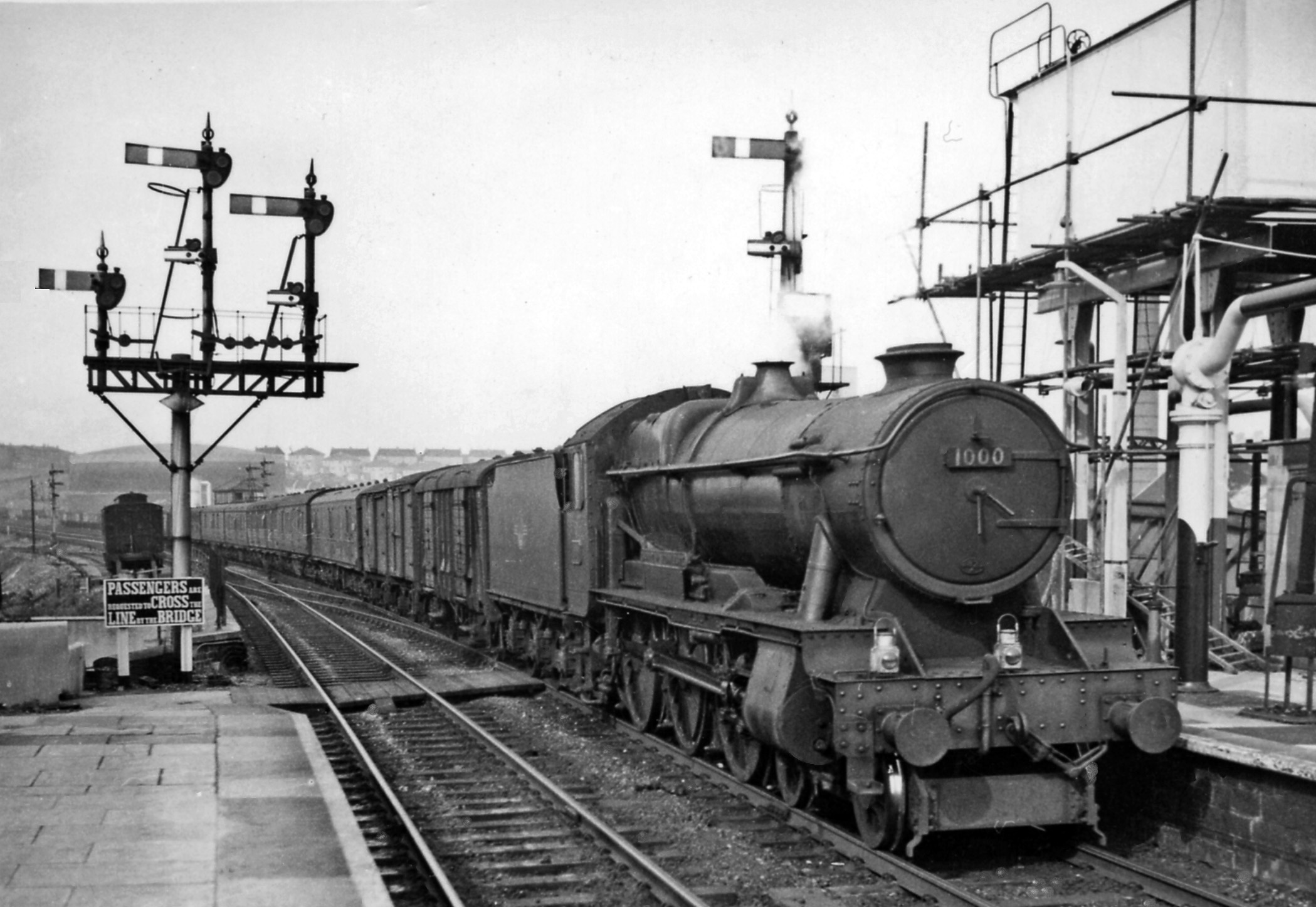
A southbound parcels train passes through Stapleton Road in 1958

Stapleton Road opened on 8 September 1863 when services began on the Bristol and South Wales Union Railway (BSWUR), which ran from Bristol Temple Meads to New Passage Pier, north of Bristol on the banks of the River Severn. At New Passage, passengers were transferred to a ferry to cross the Severn to continue on into Wales. The line, engineered by Isambard Kingdom Brunel, was built as single-track 7 ft 1/4 in (2,140 mm) broad gauge, with a platform on the west side of the track. The BSWUR was amalgamated with the Great Western Railway, which had from the beginning operated all BSWUR services, in 1868; and in 1873 the line was converted to 1,435 mm (4 ft 8 1/2 in) standard gauge. In 1874, the Clifton Extension Railway opened, connecting the Bristol Port Railway and Pier to the Great Western Railway at Narroways Hill Junction, north of Stapleton Road. To cope with the expected increase in traffic, the line was doubled, and a second platform was added to the east of the two tracks. Two more tracks were added in 1888, giving a layout of two sets of two tracks, with platforms on the outside and on an island in the middle. Trains to and from Clifton Down and Avonmouth used the western platforms while trains to and from South Wales used the eastern platforms. There were buildings on all the platforms, with the booking office on the eastern outer platform, at the head of the access road. The refreshment room was on the island platform, and a covered footbridge connected the platforms. There was a yard to the north of the station, on the other side of Stapleton Road, which handled goods traffic including coal and other minerals.

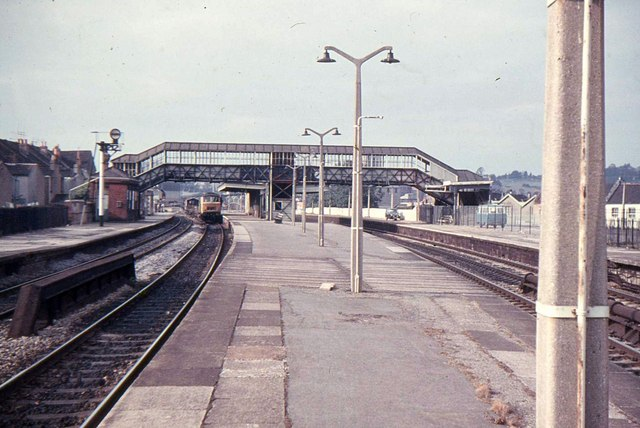
Stapleton Road railway station in 1972, showing the station with four platforms

Stapleton Road became one of Bristol's busiest stations. The opening of the Clifton Extension Railway meant that Stapleton Road became a junction station, and when the Severn Tunnel was opened in 1886, replacing the ferry from New Passage, trains from London to Wales began to run via Bristol instead of Gloucester. Many would call at Stapleton Road instead of Bristol Temple Meads because this avoided having to run the locomotive around the train. In 1886, the daily Great Western service along the Clifton Extension Railway was 6 trains each way between Avonmouth and Temple Meads, 24 trains from Clifton Down to Temple Meads and 26 the other direction. By 1910 there were 17 services daily from Avonmouth to Temple Meads and 15 the other way, a further 20 trains each day operating between Clifton Down and Temple Meads. For many passengers on the Clifton Extension Railway, Stapleton Road was where they would change for services to South Wales and the South Coast of England, and by 1912 the station name boards showed "Stapleton Road Junction for Clifton and Avonmouth", although the station was never officially renamed. But by this time the number of services to Wales had decreased owing to the opening of the "Badminton Line" from Wootton Bassett to Patchway, now part of the South Wales Main Line, which allowed trains from London to avoid central Bristol entirely. From 1924, many trains to Avonmouth were extended to Severn Beach, a growing seaside resort, and some on to Pilning, then back to Temple Meads via Patchway. Circular trips via Henbury were also common, and by 1930 a total of 350 trains would pass the station each day. The station was also used by excursion trains, and by trains of evacuees during the Second World War. By 1947, just before the start of the British Rail era, there were 33 daily services each direction between Avonmouth and Temple Meads, and 18 on Sundays. The station also saw the arrival of Prime Minister David Lloyd George in the 1920s.

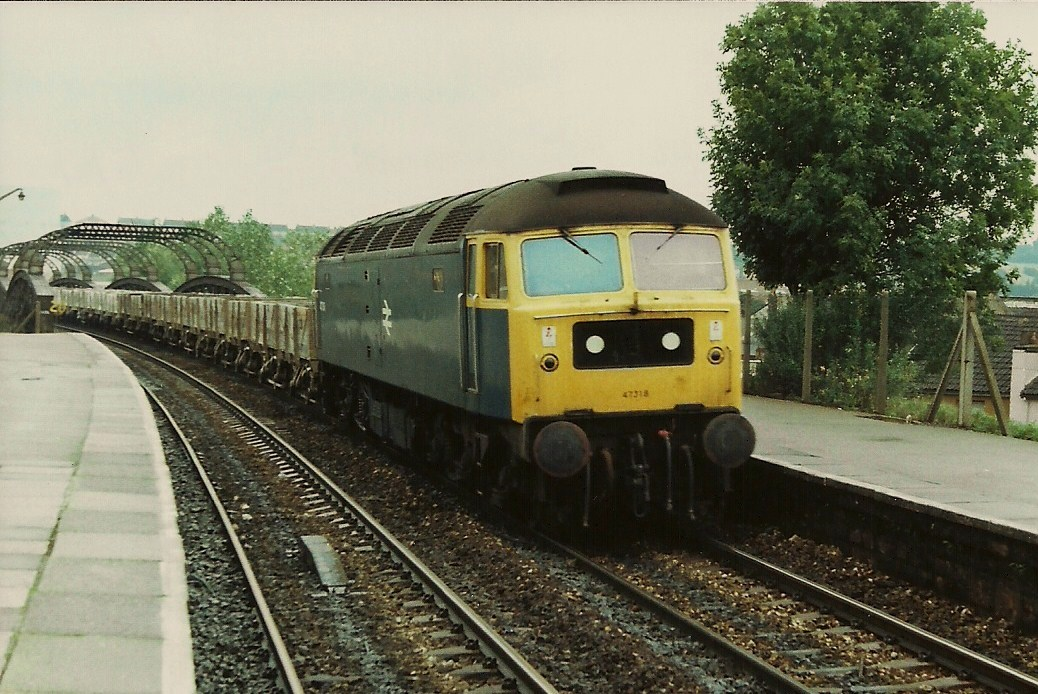
A goods train passes through Stapleton Road on the eastern "fast" line in 1981. The two tracks here would be removed in 1984, leaving only two tracks through the station.

When the railways were nationalised in 1948, Stapleton Road came under the aegis of the Western Region of British Railways. A gradual decline of services at Stapleton Road began. While as late as 1963 name boards at the station read "Bristol Stapleton Road", trains between South Wales and the South Coast were eventually re-routed via Bristol Temple Meads – the introduction of diesel multiple units making it easier for the trains to reverse – and no longer called at Stapleton Road. Passenger numbers along the Clifton Extension Railway, now known as the Severn Beach Line, also dropped, and in 1963 the Beeching report suggested that all services along the line be withdrawn. In the end, services continued to Severn Beach but were discontinued via Henbury and Pilning. The goods yard was closed on 29 November 1965, and staff were withdrawn from the station from 17 July 1967 as a cost-saving measure. In 1975 the M32 motorway was opened north of the station, passing through the southern end of the goods yard. The eastern tracks were removed in 1984, although the bridge which carried the line across the A432 and M32 was left intact. The remaining station buildings were demolished at the same time, the buildings on the island platform having already been removed by 1958. Plans to use the disused trackbed as part of a light rail scheme linking the city centre to the northern suburbs were formed in the late 1990s, with the aim of an operational scheme by 2008, but the plans had been shelved by 2004. It was suggested in 2008 that the trackbed could be used as a cycle path to join communities which had been separated by the construction of the M32 motorway, however this was dropped due to Network Rail asserting that the trackbed might be necessary for future rail expansion.

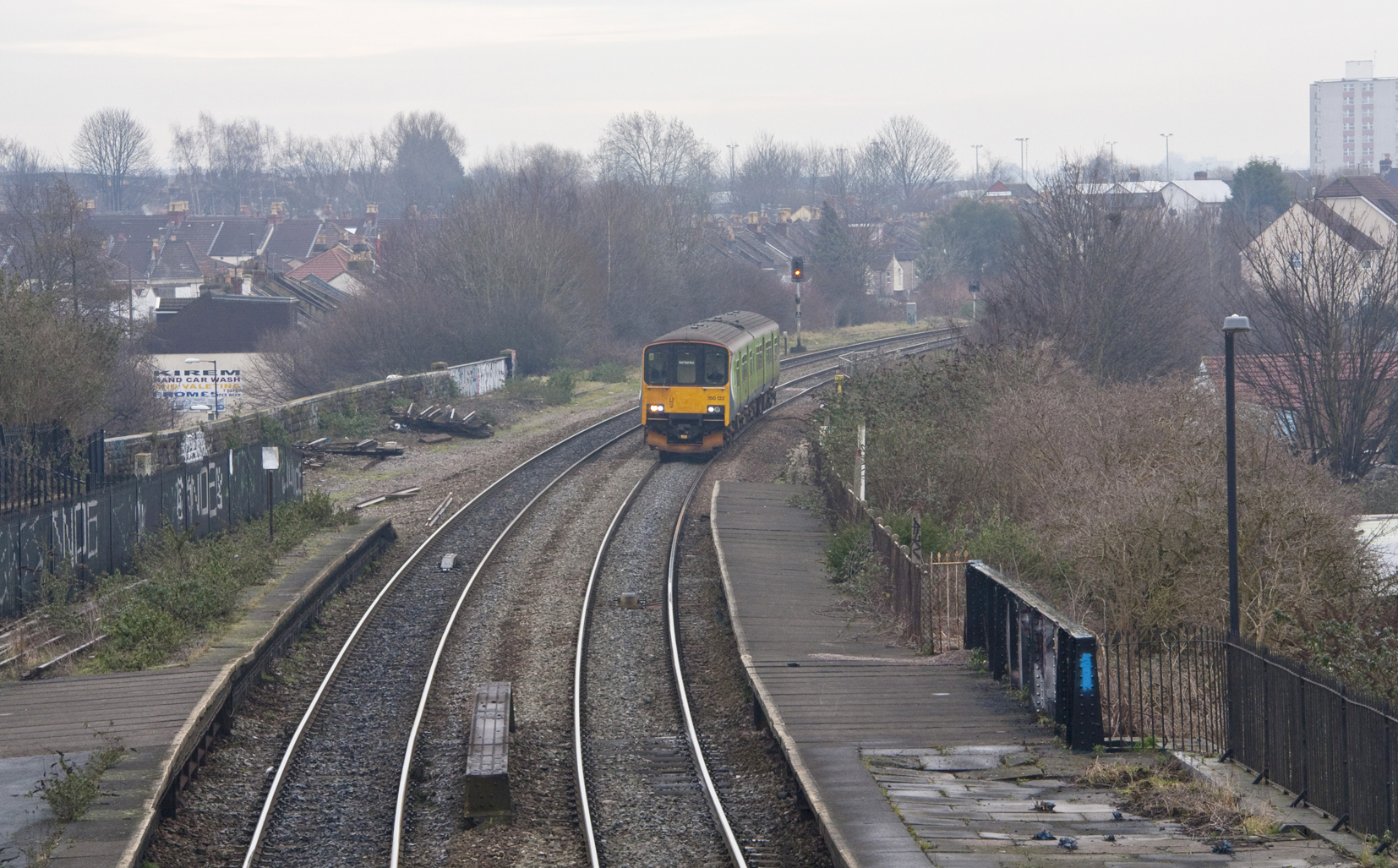
Like many stations in Bristol, large proportions of the platforms have been fenced off as the trains which call now are shorter than those which called in the station's heyday.

British Rail was split into business-led sectors in the 1980s, at which time operations at Stapleton Road passed to Regional Railways. All trains along the Severn Beach Line ran to Severn Beach, but the service pattern was irregular. This was changed in the mid-1990s, with a more frequent service to Avonmouth but very few on to Severn Beach and no Sunday services. Services at Stapleton Road were boosted due to the proximity of Eastville Stadium, but this use ended in 1986 when Bristol Rovers F.C. moved to Twerton Park in Bath.

When the railway was privatised in 1997, local services were franchised to Wales & West, which was succeeded by Wessex Trains, an arm of National Express, in 2001. The station was brightened in 1999 when a mural illustrating local life was painted on the wall of the western platform by Bill Guilding. Services along the Severn Beach Line were increased to 10 per day in each direction by 2005, with Bristol City Council providing a subsidy to Wessex Trains. The Wessex franchise was amalgamated with the Great Western franchise into the Greater Western franchise from 2006, and responsibility passed to First Great Western, a subsidiary company of FirstGroup, rebranded in 2015 as Great Western Railway. A minimum service requirement was written into the franchise agreement, ensuring an hourly service along the Severn Beach Line. Passenger traffic increased significantly, and in 2010, Sunday services to Severn Beach were restored.

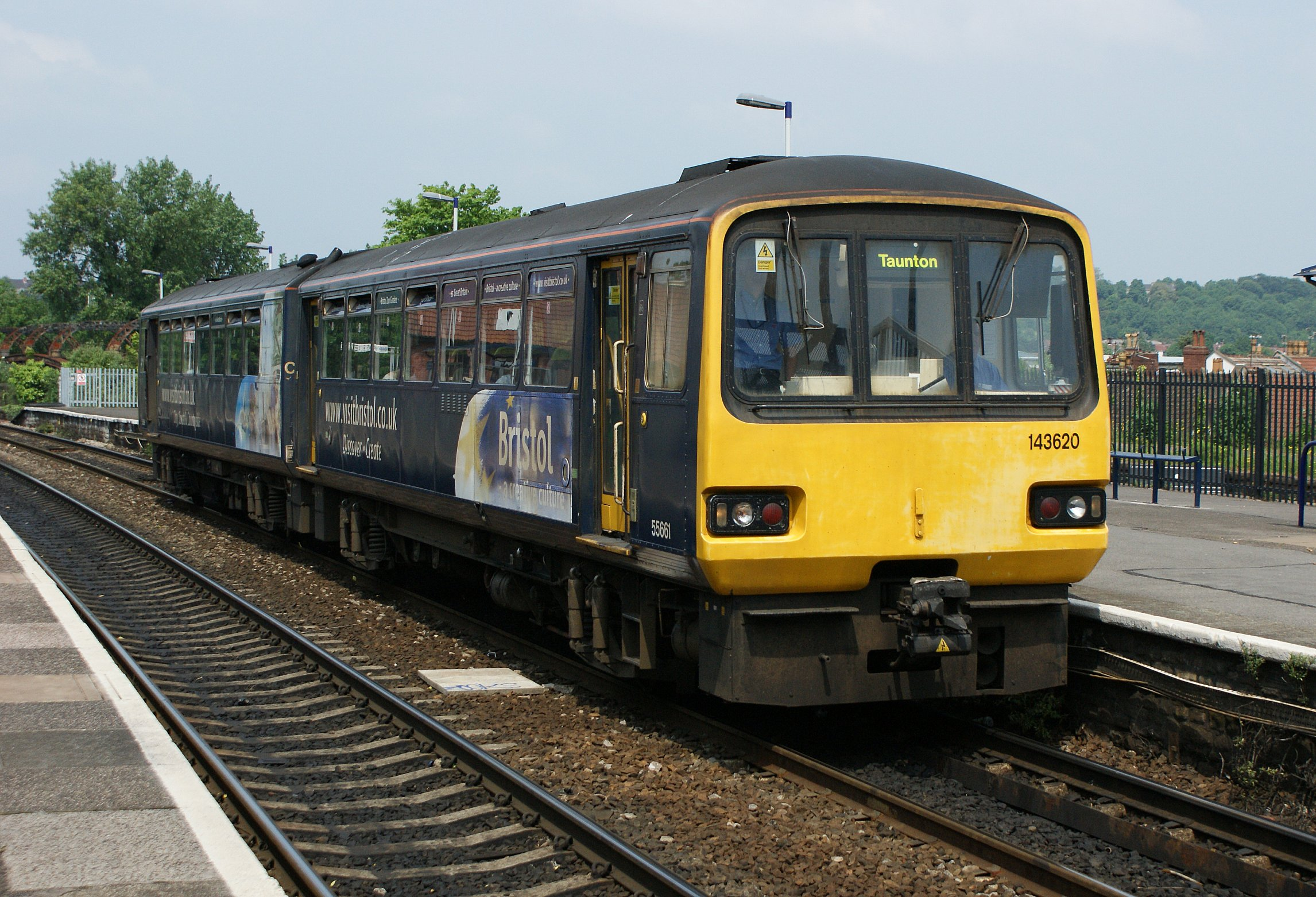
Class 143 Pacer trains used to operate services from Stapleton Road, until being moved to Devon and Cornwall in 2012.

By 2005, the disused eastern trackbed was filled with rubble, brambles and weeds, and the station had acquired a bad reputation due to muggings and the use of illegal drugs on the station premises. A community garden project, Eastside Roots, was set up in the disused trackbed by local permaculture enthusiast Nick Ward in 2009. It was built using sustainable materials, including bricks dug out during the construction of the Cabot Circus shopping centre. The project led to a general improvement of the station ambience, and residents were more willing to use it. The footbridge was replaced in 2013 to allow for electrification of the line, but the new, higher, bridge angered local residents who felt it infringed on their privacy. The station entrance, including walls and gates, were decorated in 2020 by local artists.

Preceding station	Historical railways	Following station
Filton; Line open, station closed.	Bristol and South Wales Union Railway (1863–1864)	Lawrence Hill
Ashley Hill; Line open, station closed.	Bristol and South Wales Union Railway (1864–1868)	Lawrence Hill
Ashley Hill; Line open, station closed.	Great Western Railway; Bristol and South Wales Union Railway (1864–1948)	Lawrence Hill
Ashley Hill; Line open, station closed.	Western Region of British Railways; Cross Country Route (1948–1964)	Lawrence Hill
Filton Junction; Line open, station closed.	Western Region of British Railways; Cross Country Route (1964–1982)	Lawrence Hill
Filton Junction; Line open, station closed.	Regional Railways; Cross Country Route (1982–1996)	Lawrence Hill
Filton Abbey Wood	Regional Railways; Cross Country Route (1996–1997)	Lawrence Hill
Filton Abbey Wood	Wales & West; Cross Country Route (1997–2001)	Lawrence Hill
Filton Abbey Wood	Wessex Trains; Cross Country Route (2001–2006)	Lawrence Hill
Montpelier	Great Western Railway; Clifton Extension Railway (1874–1948)	Lawrence Hill
Montpelier	Western Region of British Railways; Severn Beach Line (1948–1982)	Lawrence Hill
Montpelier	Regional Railways; Severn Beach Line (1982–1997)	Lawrence Hill
Montpelier	Wales & West; Severn Beach Line (1997–2001)	Lawrence Hill
Montpelier	Wessex Trains; Severn Beach Line (2001–2006)	Lawrence Hill

== Future ==
First Great Western declined a contractual option to continue the Greater Western passenger franchise beyond 2013, citing a desire for a longer-term contract due to the impending upgrade to the Great Western Main Line. The franchise was put out to tender, but the process was halted and later scrapped owing to the fallout from the collapse of the InterCity West Coast franchise competition. A two-year franchise extension until September 2015 was agreed in October 2013, and subsequently extended until March 2019.

The line through Stapleton Road was due to have been electrified by 2017 as part of the Great Western Main Line electrification project, however this has been postponed indefinitely. The Cross Country Route, the Severn Beach Line and the Heart of Wessex Line were not set to be electrified, therefore services at Stapleton Road would still have been provided by diesel trains, although "Sprinter" units are expected to be replaced by Class 165 and 166 "Turbo" units. The group Friends of Suburban Bristol Railways supports the electrification continuing beyond the main lines, as does former MP for Weston-super-Mare John Penrose. The electrification scheme also includes the four-tracking of Filton Bank, including the reinstatement of the disused trackbed at Stapleton Road, to allow more services between Parkway and Bristol Temple Meads and separate fast inter-city services from local stopping services. The two eastern platforms at Stapleton Road will be demolished to allow trains to run faster, although it has been suggested that they be kept for use in case of service disruptions.

Stapleton Road is on the Weston-super-Mare/Yate corridor, one of the main axes of the Greater Bristol Metro, a rail transport plan, which aims to enhance transport capacity in the Bristol area, including half-hourly services along the Severn Beach Line. The scheme could see the reopening of the Henbury Loop Line to passengers, with the possibility of services from Bristol Temple Meads to Bristol Parkway via Clifton Down and Henbury. Plans for a loop were rejected by the West of England Joint Transport Board, but Bristol City Councillors voted to send the decision back to the board for further discussion.

== See also ==
- Rail services in Bristol
- MetroWest
