= Redland railway station =

Railway station in Bristol, England

Redland
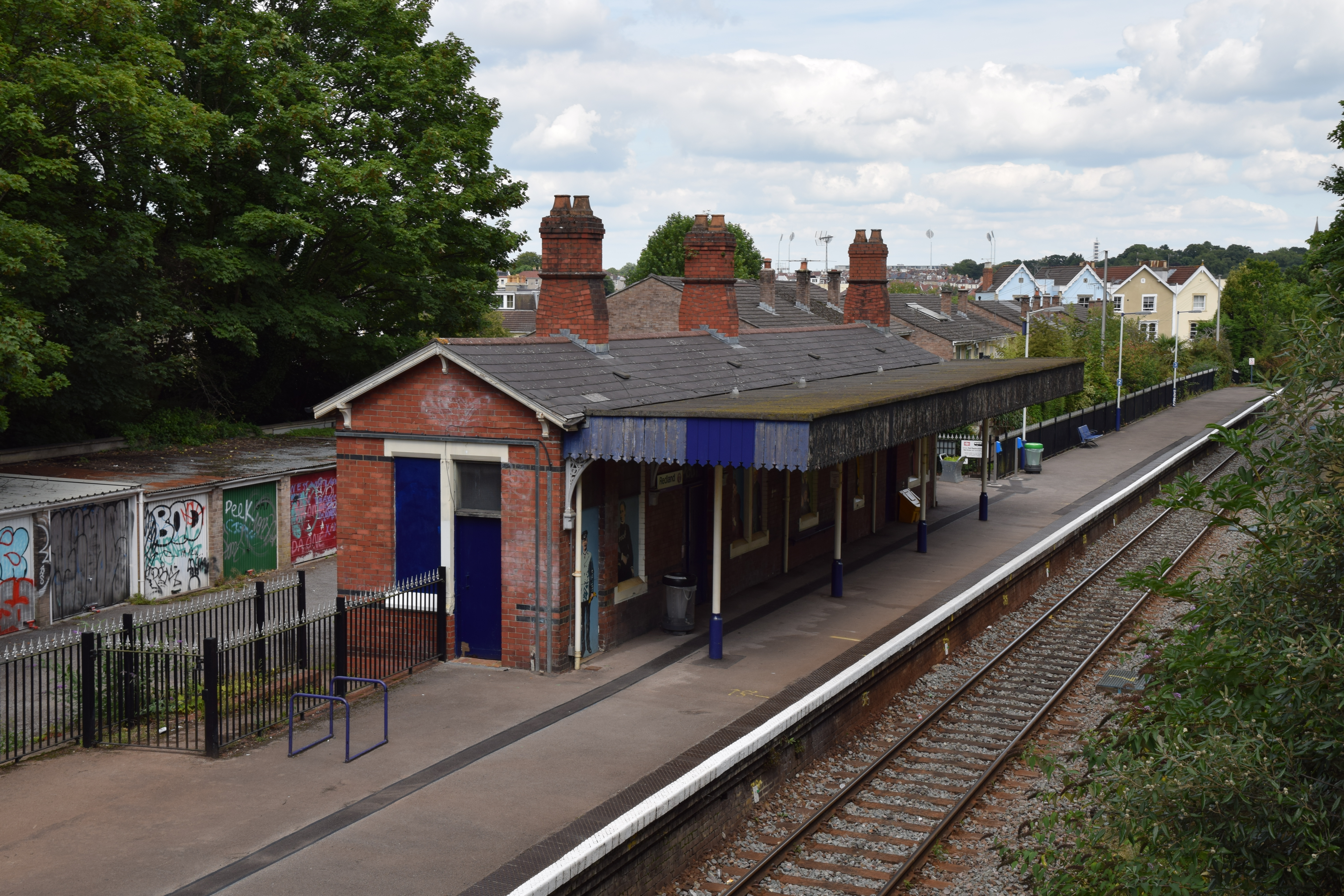

General information
- Location: Redland, Bristol; England
- Coordinates: 51.4683°N 2.5994°W
- Grid reference: ST584745
- Manager: Great Western Railway
- Platforms: 1

Other information
- Station code: RDA
- Classification: DfT category F2

Key dates
- 1897: Opened

Passengers
- 2021/22: ▲83,576
- 2022/23: ▲0.158 million
- 2023/24: ▲0.211 million
- 2024/25: ▲0.230 million
- 2025/26: ▲0.242 million
Location
Notes
- Passenger statistics from the Office of Rail and Road

Redland railway station is on the Severn Beach Line and serves the districts of Cotham and Redland in Bristol, England. It is 3.3 miles (5.3 km) from Bristol Temple Meads. Its three letter station code is RDA. As of 2015 it is managed by Great Western Railway, which is the third franchise to be responsible for the station since privatisation in 1997. They provide all train services at the station, mainly a train every 30 minutes in each direction.

The line through Redland was opened in 1874 by the Great Western and Midland Railways as part of the Clifton Extension Railway. The station itself was opened in 1897 following a petition by local residents. There were two platforms, with the main station building on the Bristol-bound platform and smaller facilities on the opposite platform. No goods facilities were provided. The main station building, although no longer in railway use, is the only original station building left on the line. In 1903 the station had 11 staff.

The Severn Beach Line declined over the latter half of the twentieth century, with passenger numbers falling significantly. All station staff were withdrawn in 1967, with the line through the station reduced to single track in 1970, with the second platform taken out of use. Services had decreased to ten per day each direction by 2005, but have since increased to a train every 30 minutes in each direction.

== Description ==
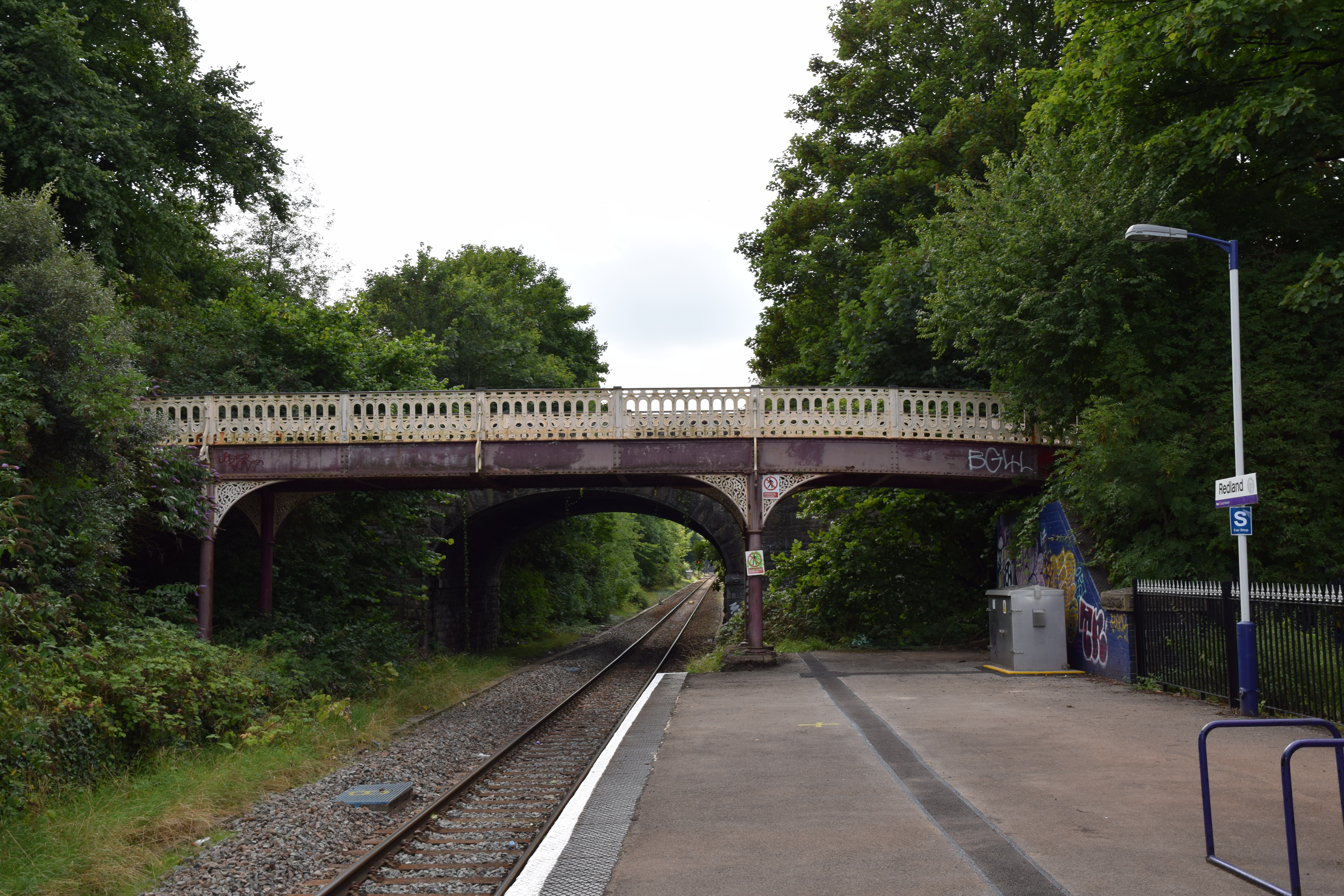
The ornate footbridge at Redland

Redland railway station is on the Severn Beach Line, serving the areas of Cotham and Redland, Bristol. The surrounding area is mostly residential, with some commercial premises to the east. A park and tennis centre are directly to the south. The station is located 3 miles 25 chains (5.3 km) along the line from Bristol Temple Meads, and 10 miles 18 chains (16.5 km) from Severn Beach. (Note: Railways in the United Kingdom are, for historical reasons, measured in miles and chains. There are 80 chains to the mile.) It is the fourth station from Temple Meads. There is a single 130-yard (120 m)-long platform which serves trains in both directions, situated on the north side of the track and angled at 062 degrees. The station's southern platform was abandoned in 1970 and is overgrown.

Facilities at the station are minimal – there are a few chairs and timetable information is provided. Help points, giving next train information, were installed in 2010. There is no ticket office, but a self-service ticket machine is available. As of 2024, a new display for live train times was installed, providing information for rail users. The Victorian-era station building is the only original station building left on the line, decorated with a mural painted by local students, it is used as an upholsterer's showroom rather than for railway purposes. Access is step-free from South Road, through an area containing residents' garages. The platform backs onto the gardens on the south side of the road.

At the west end of the station are two bridges, neither directly accessible from the station: the first is a footbridge carrying the Lovers' Walk footpath, then some 10 metres (11 yd) beyond is a road bridge carrying Redland Grove. The line crosses over Redland Road just beyond the east end of the station.

There is no car park or taxi rank. Cycle storage is available on the platform. There is a bus stop on South Road, and another on Redland Grove.

== Services ==
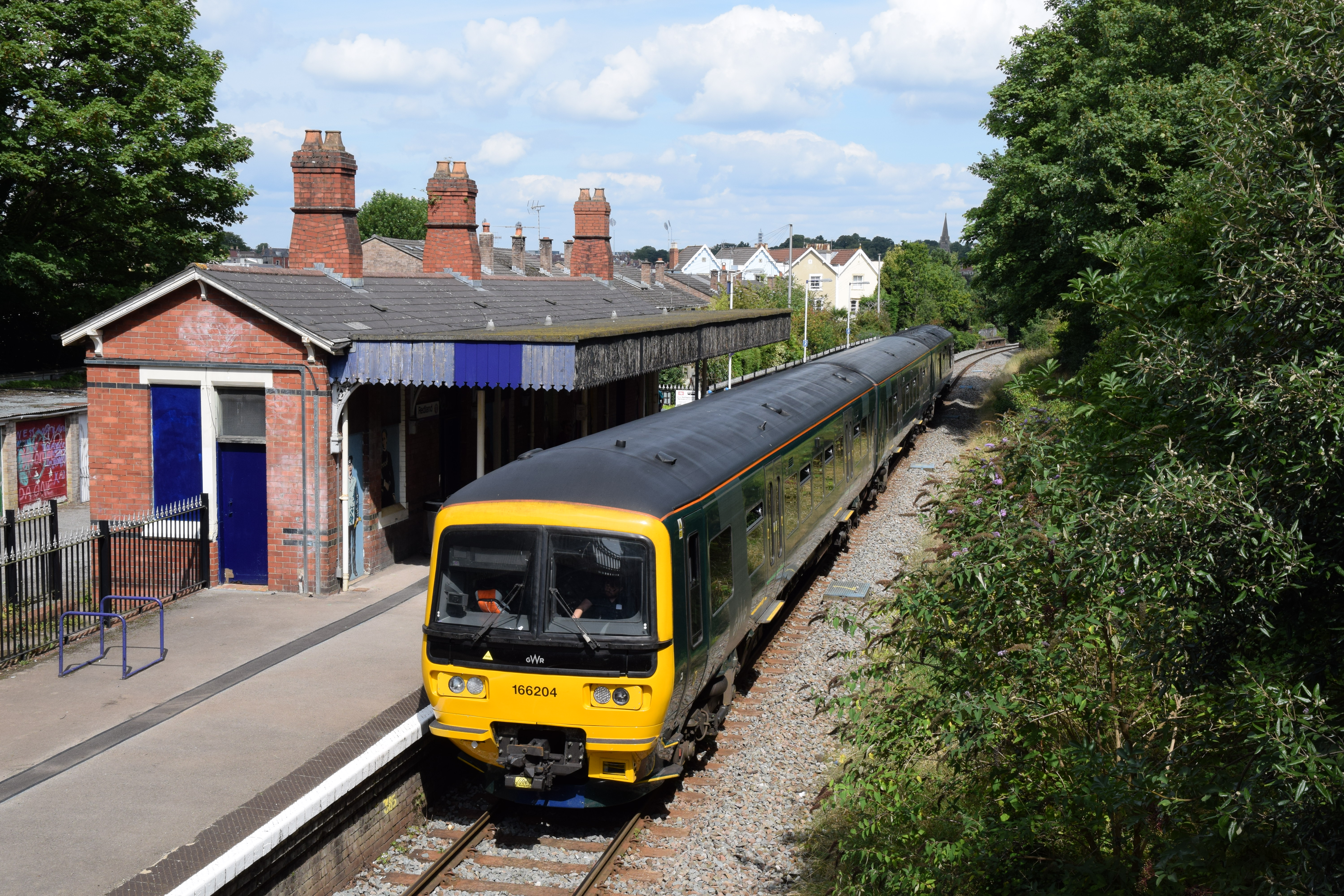
A Class 166 at Redland with a service to Bristol Temple Meads

All services at Redland are operated by Great Western Railway using Class 166 Turbo DMUs.

The typical off-peak service in trains per hour is:

- 2 tph to Bristol Temple Meads of which 1 continues to Weston-super-Mare
- 2 tph to Avonmouth of which 1 continues to Severn Beach

On Sundays, there is an hourly service between Bristol Temple Meads and Severn Beach with one train per day to and from Weston-super-Mare.

Services previously ran every 40 minutes in each direction but were increased to half-hourly in the December 2021 timetable change.

Preceding station	National Rail	Following station
Clifton Down	Great Western Railway Severn Beach Line	Montpelier

== History ==
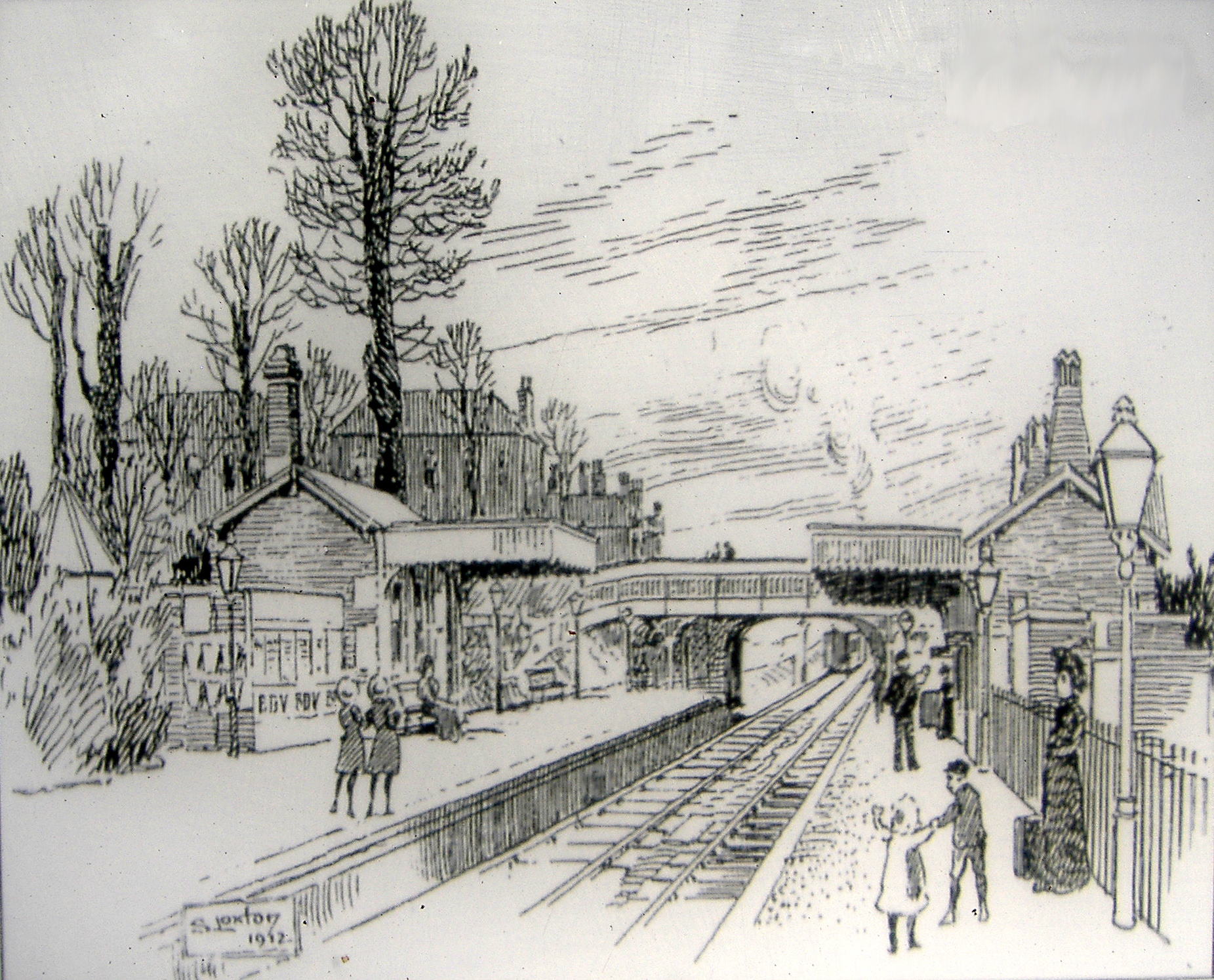
The station as it was in 1912, from an illustration by Samuel Loxton.

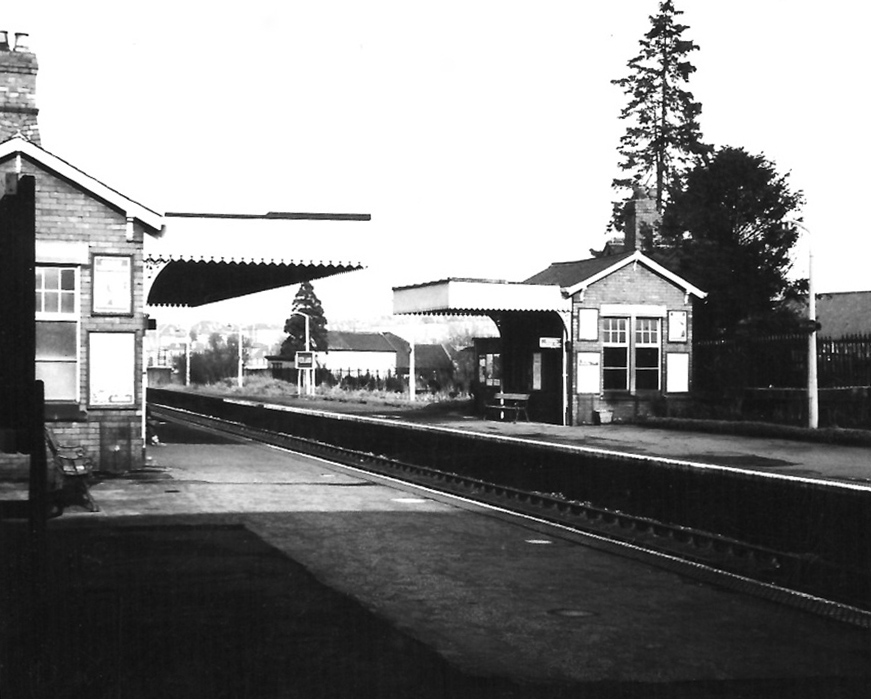
The station in 1964. The main station building is on the left. The waiting room on the right would be demolished in 1970.

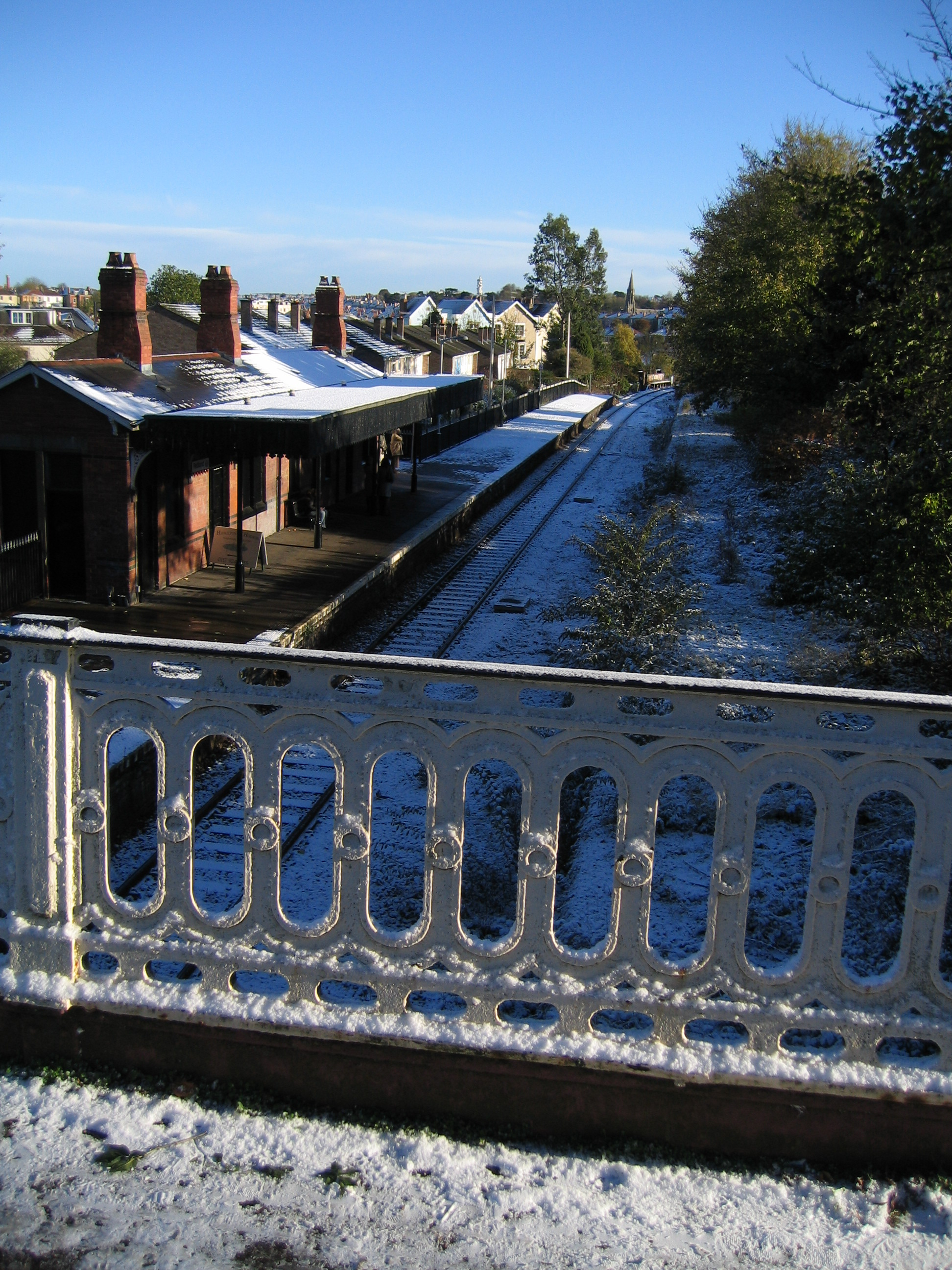
Redland railway station in some snow in 2005. The disused southern platform can clearly be seen on the right of the picture.

The Clifton Extension Railway was opened from Narroways Hill Junction to Clifton Down as a joint venture between the Great Western Railway and Midland Railway, to connect their main lines to the Bristol Port Railway and Pier in the Avon Gorge. Passenger services to Clifton Down began in 1874, and through services to Avonmouth started in 1885. There was not initially a station at Redland, but there was local support, with several petitions submitted to the line's Joint Railway Committee. The first was received in October 1885, but was rejected due to the estimated cost of £3,410 to provide the station. A second petition was rejected eighteen months later. The Bristol Chamber of Commerce petitioned for a station in 1892, but the committee again rejected the request, stating that estimated traffic levels would not justify the expense. It took until 1896 until a revised plan was accepted by the committee.

Construction of the station was complicated by the need to keep the line open: trains ferrying materials were unable to stay on-site for long, and frequently had to switch from one track to the other, necessitating trips to nearby Montpelier railway station, where the nearest crossover points were located. The station finally opened on 12 April 1897. The first train was the 7 am service: 94 tickets were issued to Clifton Down, and an estimated 550 passengers bought tickets from the station the same day. Some local writers were sceptical, claiming that many of those first day passengers were not new passengers, but would previously have travelled from Montpelier or Clifton Down. Construction took nine months, and cost £2,000.

The station as built had two through lines, with platforms on either side. The southern "down" platform was for trains towards Clifton Down and Avonmouth, the northern "up" platform for trains towards Montpelier and Bristol. The main station building, comprising the station master's office, general waiting room, ladies' waiting room and cloakroom, was on the northern platform. A smaller building was built in the same style on the southern platform, and was used as a general waiting room. No goods facilities were provided. A footbridge at the west end of the platforms, between the preexisting Lovers' Walk and Redland Grove bridges, allowed access between the two platforms. The ticket office was situated at the north end of this bridge, on South Road. In September 1899, a Midland Railway-style signal box was opened at the east end of the northern platform. Services were provided by the Great Western Railway and the Midland Railway. Midland trains worked between Clifton Down and Fishponds or Mangotsfield, where passengers could change for services to Bath, Birmingham and other Midland destinations. The Great Western provided services from Bristol Temple Meads to Clifron Down and Avonmouth, many looping back to Temple Meads via Henbury or Pilning. Bristol Temple Meads was the city's major station, where passengers could change for trains to London, Exeter and Wales, among others. There were also occasional through services to Weston-super-Mare. In 1910, Redland saw 20 Great Western trains each day to and from Clifton Down, a further 17 from and 15 to Avonmouth, and 13 Midland trains in each direction between Clifton Down and Mangotsfield or Fishponds. Midland services were suspended from 1 January 1917 due to the First World War, but resumed in May 1919.

In 1903, the station employed 11 men, but the post of station master was abolished on 27 August 1909 as a cost-cutting measure, with responsibility passing to Clifton Down. There were six staff by 1938. In 1923, grouping resulted in the Midland Railway being absorbed into the London, Midland and Scottish Railway (LMS), and the line continued in a joint arrangement between the Great Western and the LMS. Services to Fishponds ended on 31 March 1941. When the railways were nationalised in 1948, when it came under the aegis of the Western Region of British Railways. The signal box closed in 1950, and by 1958 there were only three staff members: a booking clerk and two porters. Through services to Pilning and Henbury ceased with the Beeching Axe in 1964, with services terminating at Severn Beach, and from December that year the station was unstaffed after 2 pm. Staff were withdrawn completely on 17 July 1967, a fate shared by most of the other stations on the Severn Beach Line. The southern running line was lifted on 19 October 1970, and the adjacent platform abandoned and its shelter demolished. The ticket office and footbridge were also demolished, with a replacement entrance opened through the South Road garages.

British Rail was split into business-led sectors in the 1980s, at which time operations at Redland passed to Regional Railways. All trains ran to Severn Beach, but the service pattern was irregular. This was changed in the mid-1990s, with a more frequent service to Avonmouth but very few on to Severn Beach. Local tourism expert Bernard Lane described the line's state as

... the line the railway wished was not there. It was the line that got bus substitution whenever they were short of trains or queues, when a rugby match in Cardiff needed a special. It has a problem in that the route is slow and not very direct; for years it was invisible, short of marketing and lacking a regular interval timetable.

By 1995 there was no Sunday service, and there was even talk of the line being closed completely.

When the railway was privatised in 1997, local services were franchised to Wales & West, which was succeeded by Wessex Trains, an arm of National Express, in 2001. Following action by Friends of Severn Beach Railway (FOSBR) and a string of protests, services had increased to 10 per day in each direction by 2005, with Bristol City Council providing a subsidy to Wessex Trains. The Wessex franchise was amalgamated with the Great Western franchise into the Greater Western franchise from 2006, and responsibility passed to First Great Western, a subsidiary company of FirstGroup, subsequently rebranded as Great Western Railway. A minimum service requirement was written into the franchise agreement, ensuring an hourly service along the line. In 2007, the Council unanimously agreed to pay £450,000 per annum to fund extra services from May 2008 for three years, which resulted in a 60% increase in passenger numbers along the line, and a 25% year-on-year increase between June 2009 and June 2010. Sunday services to Severn Beach were restored in 2010.

Passenger numbers at Redland were further boosted by a marketing campaign by the Severnside Community Rail Partnership to attract more people, especially students, to use the station. The work won a Department for Transport Community Rail Marketing Award in 2007. The Severnside CRP also formed a support group for the station, and improved the provision of timetabling information through the use of simplified departure timetable posters. In 2008, they helped to renovate and repaint the station building. It was decorated in 2009 by students from Fairfield School, who created a mural of Victorian characters with incongruous details such as mobile phones, sunglasses and funny hats. The work won a Community Rail Award.

Customer help points with next train information screens were installed during 2008/09, paid for by money from the Department for Transport's "Access for All" fund and local councils. The help points were stolen in early 2010, but have since been replaced. Ticket machines were installed in early 2011, following complaints that passengers were unable to pay their fares. A small coffee stand and snack bar began operating at the station in 2014.

Preceding station	Historical railways	Following station
Clifton Down	Midland Railway; Clifton Extension Railway (1897–1917, 1919–1922)	Montpelier
Clifton Down	London, Midland and Scottish Railway; Clifton Extension Railway (1922–1941)	Montpelier
Clifton Down	Great Western Railway; Clifton Extension Railway (1897–1948)	Montpelier
Clifton Down	Western Region of British Railways; Severn Beach Line (1948–1982)	Montpelier
Clifton Down	Regional Railways; Severn Beach Line (1982–1997)	Montpelier
Clifton Down	Wales & West; Severn Beach Line (1997–2001)	Montpelier
Clifton Down	Wessex Trains; Severn Beach Line (2001–2006)	Montpelier

== Future ==
First Great Western declined a contractual option to continue the Greater Western passenger franchise (of which services at Redland are a part) beyond 2013, citing a desire for a longer-term contract due to the impending upgrade to the Great Western Main Line. The franchise was put out to tender, but the process was halted and later scrapped due to the fallout from the collapse of the InterCity West Coast franchise competition. A two-year franchise extension until September 2015 was agreed in October 2013, and subsequently extended until March 2019.

With the coming upgrade to the Great Western Main Line, the main line from London to Bristol is due to be electrified by 2016. However, the electrification will not extend beyond the main lines, so Redland will continue to be served by diesel trains, with the current "Sprinter" units expected to be replaced by Class 165 and 166 "Turbo" units. Stephen Williams, MP for Bristol West, questioned whether electrification could continue to Redland. Then-Secretary of State for Transport Philip Hammond replied that it would have to be looked at in the future. The group Friends of Suburban Bristol Railways supports the electrification of the entire Severn Beach Line.

Improved services at Redland are called for as part of the Greater Bristol Metro scheme, a rail transport plan which aims to enhance transport capacity in the Bristol area. There is an aspiration for half-hourly services, with trains towards Bristol terminating alternately at Portishead and Bath Spa, however due to the large sections of the Severn Beach Line which are single-track and to the congested main line from Temple Meads, such frequency is not currently feasible. The scheme was given the go-ahead in July 2012 as part of the City Deal, whereby local councils would be given greater control over money by the government. There are also calls for the reopening of the Henbury Loop Line, which could allow a direct service from Redland to Bristol Parkway via Avonmouth. Plans for a loop were rejected by the West of England Joint Transport Board, however Bristol City Councillors voted to send the decision back to the board for further discussion.

== See also ==
- Rail services in Bristol
