= Redlands, Newfoundland and Labrador =

Ghost town in Newfoundland and Labrador, Canada

Coordinates: 47.402°N 54.243°W

Location of Redlands in Newfoundland and Labrador

Redlands is Beothuck land and eventually became a mixed settlement in Newfoundland and Labrador, on the Bay de Verde peninsula near its northern tip. It survived into the second half of the twentieth century with a dwindling population. Most of the population gradually moved to Low Point (settlement) and other, nearby places. Pin on map is incorrect.
