= Montpelier railway station =

Railway station in Bristol, England

Montpelier
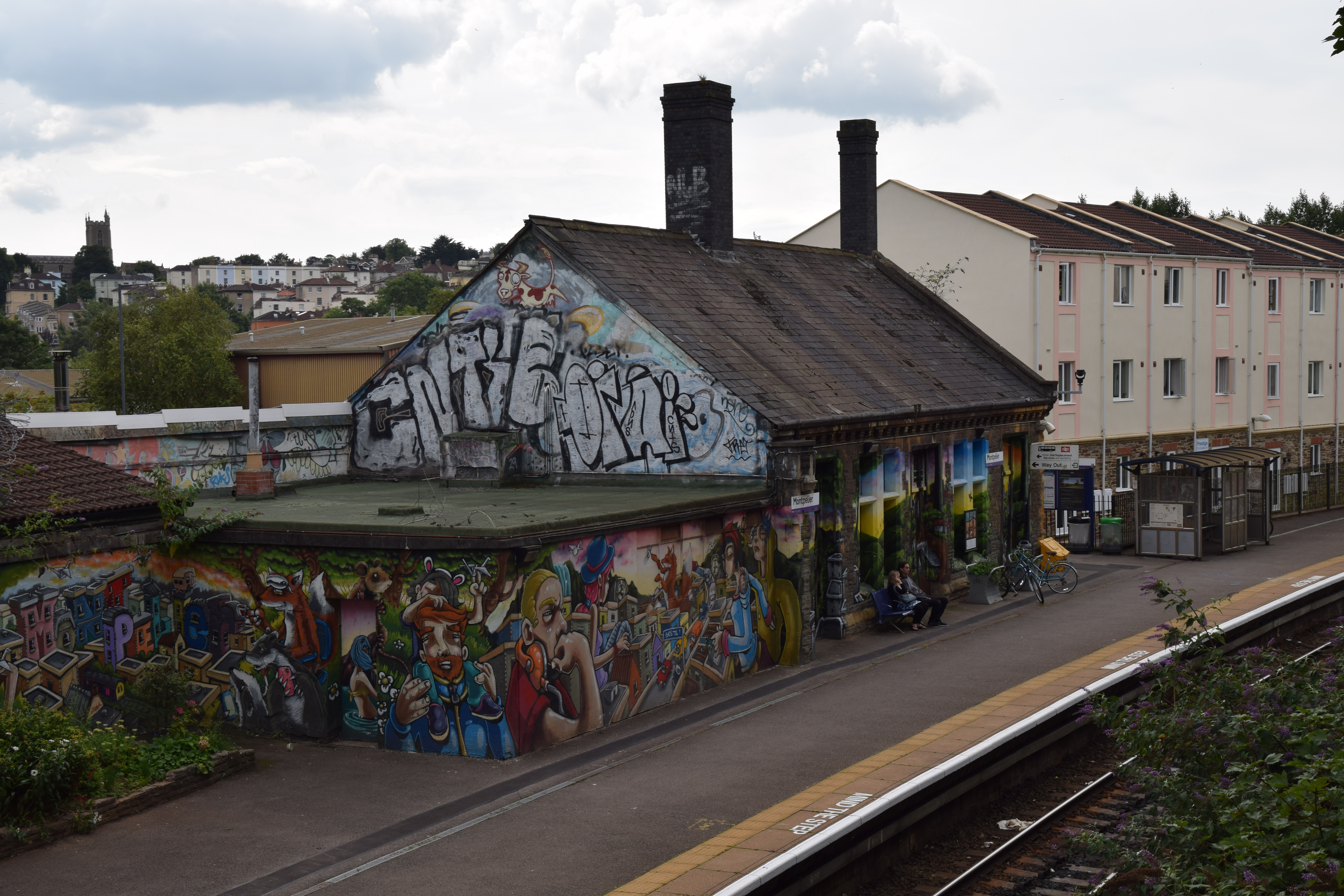

General information
- Location: Montpelier, Bristol; England
- Coordinates: 51.4684°N 2.5887°W
- Grid reference: ST592745
- Manager: Great Western Railway
- Platforms: 1

Other information
- Station code: MTP
- Classification: DfT category F2

History
- Original company: Clifton Extension Railway
- Post-grouping: Great Western Railway and London, Midland and Scottish Railway

Key dates
- 1 October 1874: Opened
- 18 November 1965: Closed to goods traffic
- 17 July 1967: Staffing withdrawn
- 1970: Line singled

Passengers
- 2021/22: ▲91,758
- 2022/23: ▲0.170 million
- 2023/24: ▲0.232 million
- 2024/25: ▲0.252 million
- 2025/26: ▲0.263 million
Location
Notes
- Passenger statistics from the Office of Rail and Road

Montpelier railway station is on the Severn Beach Line and serves the district of Montpelier in Bristol, England. It is 2.85 miles (4.59 km) from Bristol Temple Meads. Its three letter station code is MTP. The station has a single platform, serving trains in both directions. As of 2015 it is managed by Great Western Railway, which is the third franchise to be responsible for the station since privatisation in 1997. They provide all train services at the station, mainly a train every 30 minutes in each direction.

The station was opened on 1 October 1874 as Montpellier (two 'L's) by the Great Western and Midland Railways as part of the Clifton Extension Railway, designed to connect the port of Avonmouth to the national rail network. In February 1888 the station's name changed to Montpelier (one 'L'). The station had two platforms, with the main structures on the southern platform and smaller waiting rooms on the northern platform. In 1903 the station employed 19 staff. Much of the main station building was destroyed by bombing during the Second World War.

The Severn Beach Line declined over the latter half of the twentieth century, with passenger numbers falling significantly. Goods services at Montpelier ended in 1965, and all staff were withdrawn in 1967. The line was largely reduced to single track in 1970, with the northern platform abandoned and all trains using the remaining platform. The station building is no longer in railway use. Services had decreased to ten per day each direction by 2005, but have since increased to a train every 30 minutes in each direction.

== Description ==
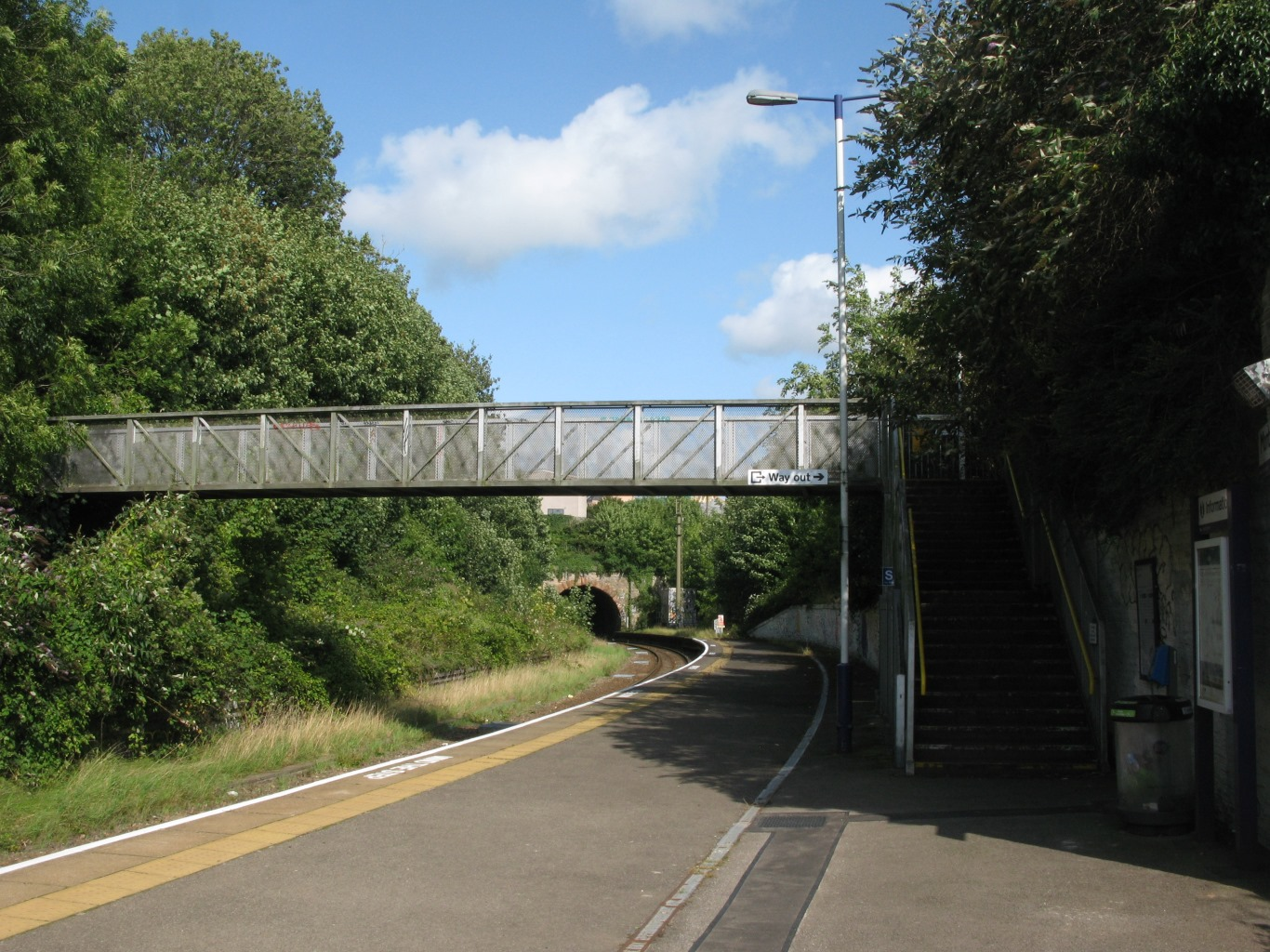
The platform at Montpelier, looking towards Stapleton Road and Bristol Temple Meads

Montpelier railway station is located in the Bristol ward of Ashley, north of the city centre, serving the districts of Montpelier, Cotham, Ashley Down and St Andrews. The surrounding area is mostly residential, with shops on the nearby A38 Cheltenham Road. The station can be accessed step-free from Station Road to the south, or by a footbridge and steps from Cromwell Road to the north. The station is on the Severn Beach Line from Bristol Temple Meads to Severn Beach, 2 miles 68 chains (4.6 km) (Note: Railways in the United Kingdom are, for historical reasons, measured in miles and chains. There are 80 chains to the mile.) from Bristol Temple Meads, and 10 miles 55 chains (17.2 km) from Severn Beach. It is the third station from Temple Meads, and first station of the branch part of the line (the first two stations, Lawrence Hill and Stapleton Road, are on the main line Cross Country Route). The station is on a roughly east–west alignment, curving to the north, with a single 144-yard-long (132 m) curved platform to the south of the track, serving trains in both directions. Directly to the east of the station is the 268-yard-long (245 m) Montpelier Tunnel, and to the west is The Arches bridge over the A38. The station's northern platform was abandoned in 1970 and is overgrown.

Facilities at the station are minimal – there are a few chairs and timetable information is provided. There are help points on the platform, giving next train information and allowing passengers to contact staff. There is no ticket office, though a self-service ticket machine was installed in 2022. The station building is used as a workshop and showroom for a company selling fireplaces, and is bricked up on the platform side. It is, however, colourfully decorated with a mural, painted as a collaborative effort between the Severnside Community Rail Partnership and local schools. The Severnside CRP also tend the station's garden in conjunction with the nearby Montpelier High School. There is no car park or taxi rank, but there are bus stops on Cromwell Road, and more on the busy A38 Cheltenham Road roughly 400 yards (370 m) away. Cycle storage is available on the platform.

The line through Montpelier has a 30 miles per hour (48 km/h) speed limit for diesel multiple units, and 15 miles per hour (24 km/h) for other trains. The line, which is not electrified, has loading gauge W6A, and carries less than 5 million train tonnes per year. In the 2013/14 financial year, approximately 120,000 passengers used Montpelier station, making it the 1592nd busiest station in the country and the fifth busiest within the Bristol unitary authority area. This was an increase of almost 100% from the 2002–03 financial year, and reflected a general rise in usage of the Severn Beach Line. (Note: Annual estimated passenger usage based on sales of tickets in stated financial year(s) which end or originate at Montpelier, from Office of Rail and Road statistics. Methodology may vary year on year.)

== Services ==
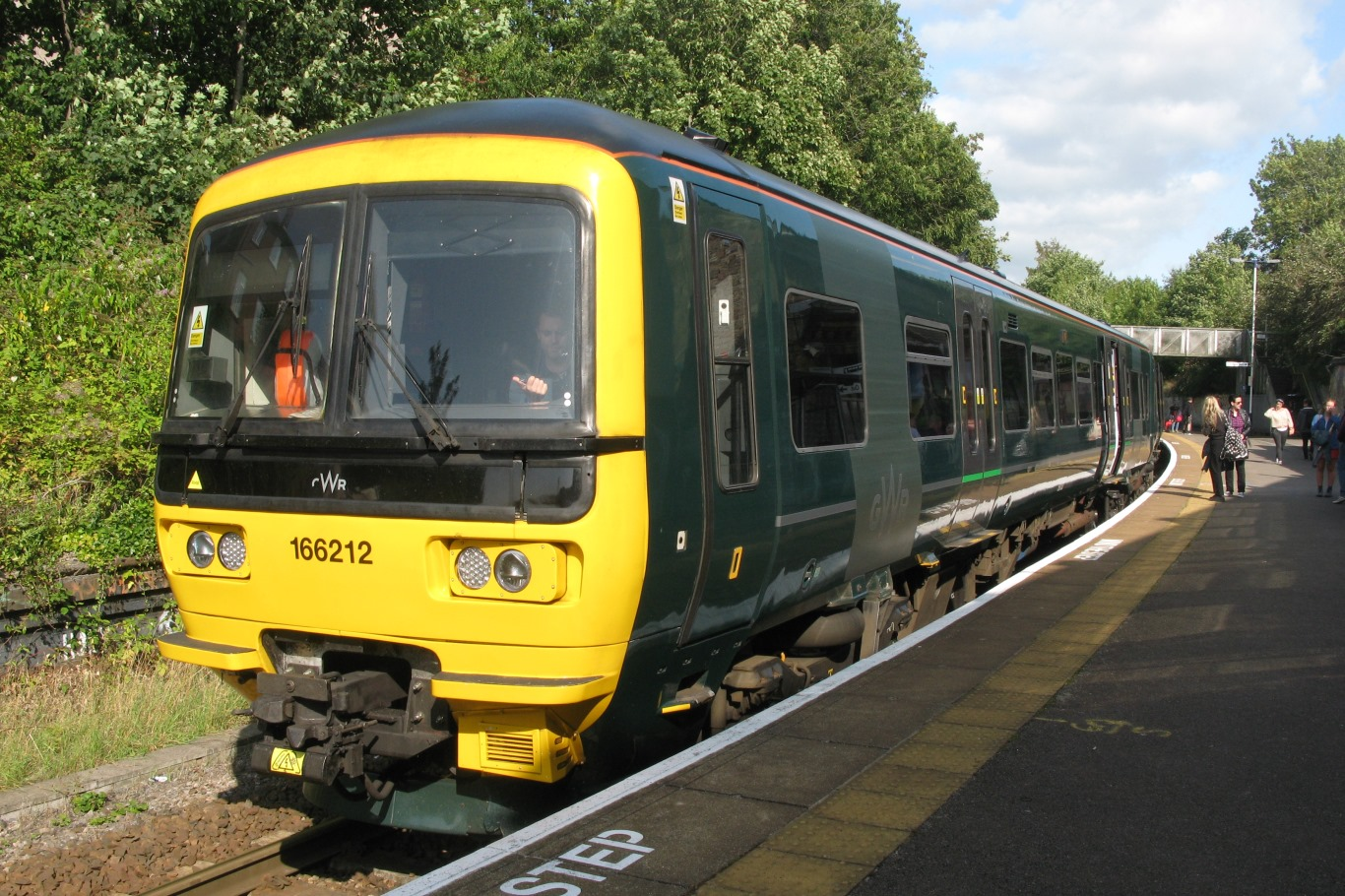
A Class 166 at Montpelier with an Avonmouth service

All services at Montpelier are operated by Great Western Railway using Class 166 Turbo DMUs.

The typical off-peak service in trains per hour is:

- 2 tph to Bristol Temple Meads of which 1 continues to Weston-super-Mare
- 2 tph to Avonmouth of which 1 continues to Severn Beach

On Sundays, there is an hourly service between Bristol Temple Meads and Severn Beach with one train per day to and from Weston-super-Mare.

Services previously ran every 40 minutes in each direction but were increased to half-hourly in the December 2021 timetable change.

Preceding station	National Rail	Following station
Redland	Great Western Railway Severn Beach Line	Stapleton Road

== History ==
=== Joint railway era ===
Montpelier railway station was opened on 1 October 1874 when the Clifton Extension Railway began operations. The line, a joint venture between the Midland and Great Western Railways, was built to connect the Bristol Port Railway and Pier to the national network. It ran from Sneyd Park Junction in the Avon Gorge via Clifton Down station to Ashley Hill Junction, east of Montpelier, from which the Great Western and Midland lines diverged – the Great Western heading south, joining the Bristol and South Wales Union Railway towards Bristol Temple Meads, the Midland heading east towards Mangotsfield. The line was built at 4 ft 8 1/2 in (1,435 mm) standard gauge, and was initially managed by the Clifton Extension Railway Joint Committee.

The station was built by Messrs Baker & Son of Canon's Marsh, Bristol. There were two platforms, with the southern platform used by trains towards Clifton Down and the northern one by trains in the other direction. The platforms were 405 feet (123 m) long and spacious, but open to the elements with little in the way of cover. An iron footbridge linked the two platforms, as well as carrying a pedestrian right of way between Cromwell Road to the north and Station Road to the south. The original station buildings were built from pennant stone, a common material in the Bristol area, and partly obtained from the digging of a cutting near Clifton Down. The station master had lodgings above the waiting rooms on the southern platform, which had separate ticket windows for Midland and Great Western services. The buildings on the northern platform were principally waiting rooms. A goods yard was provided on the south side of Station Road, mainly used for coal traffic, and accessible from the west via a bridge over the road. A signal box with 16 levers was located at the west end of the southern platform, controlling the yard and crossover points on the main line. There was some debate about whether the station should be called "Montpelier" or "Montpellier", but the joint railway committee overseeing the line ruled in favour of the former in 1888. In 1895 a petition was submitted to the joint railway committee, asking for better cover for the platforms, improved waiting rooms and a new booking office on the northern platform. The committee agreed to extend the canopy on the northern platform, and to improve the waiting rooms, but refused to build a new booking office. The work was completed in 1896. Further building work took place during the First World War, when the southern platform was extended.

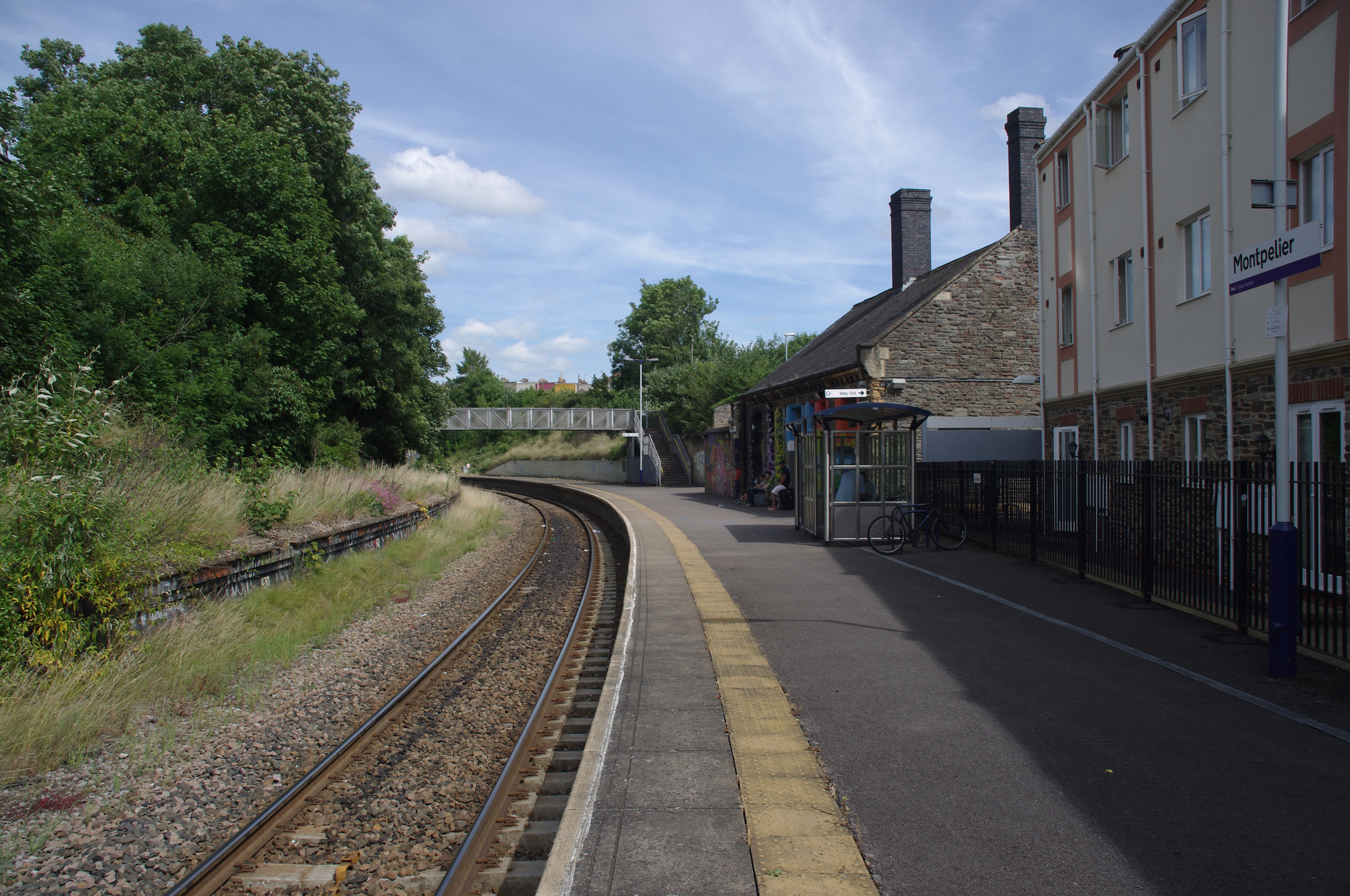
Looking east along the platform. The disused northern platform can be seen on the left.

The initial Monday to Saturday service provided at Montpelier by the Midland Railway was 13 trains per day between Clifton Down, Fishponds and Mangotsfield, where passengers could change for services to Bath, Birmingham and other Midland destinations. The Great Western provided ten services per day between Clifton Down and Bristol Temple Meads, the city's major station, where passengers could change for trains to London, Exeter and Wales, among others. The Great Western also provided occasional through services to Weston-super-Mare. On Sundays, there was no Midland service, but seven Great Western trains. The Clifton Down Tunnel, the final link to the Bristol Port Railway and Pier, was opened in 1877, initially allowing freight trains to reach Avonmouth Docks. It was not until 1885 that it was cleared for passenger use, which allowed services to Avonmouth via Sea Mills and Shirehampton. There was a trial Midland service between Bristol St Philip's and Avonmouth in September 1885, but this was ended after a month. In 1886, the daily Great Western service at Montpelier consisted of six trains to Avonmouth, 24 to Clifton Down and 32 to Temple Meads. The Midland provided 12 services from Clifton Down to Fishponds, and 11 back. In the first 20 years of the Montpelier's use, the station handled large numbers of parcels, and was popular for day trips to Weston-super-Mare. The station's management passed to the Great Western & Midland Railways Joint Committee on 1 November 1894.

The station was initially well-staffed: in 1903 there were 19 staff, although this had fallen to 15 by 1935. Before the First World War, it was not unusual for extra porters to be sent to Montpelier to handle large quantities of goods – the station was used by many commercial travellers who had large hampers full of clothes and samples, and the loading on Monday morning had the potential to cause delays. In 1910, Montpelier saw 17 Great Western services from Avonmouth to Temple Meads and 15 the other way, a further 20 trains each day operating between Clifton and Temple Meads, and 13 Midland trains each way between Clifton and Fishponds or Mangotsfield. Midland services were suspended from 1 January 1917 to 15 May 1919 due to the War. The Hotwells section of the Bristol Port Railway and Pier closed in 1922, so to compensate an additional six trains were provided to Avonmouth, with four back.

In 1923, grouping resulted in the Midland Railway being absorbed into the London, Midland and Scottish Railway (LMS), and the line continued in a joint arrangement between the Great Western and the LMS. From 1924, many trains to Avonmouth were extended to Severn Beach, a growing seaside resort, and some on to Pilning, then back to Temple Meads via Patchway. The post of station master was withdrawn on 29 March 1926, with responsibility passing to staff at Clifton Down. Redland had suffered a similar loss in 1909. Much of the main station building on the southern platform was destroyed in the Bristol Blitz during the Second World War; the current building is what remains of this, together with a utilitarian post-war extension. The war also saw the end of services to Fishponds and Mangotsfield, the last operating on 31 March 1941. By 1947, just before the start of the British Rail era, there were 33 services each direction between Avonmouth and Temple Meads, and 18 on Sundays. Some trains made circular trips to and from Temple Meads via Clifton Down and Henbury or Pilning.

=== British Rail and privatisation ===
When the railways were nationalised in 1948, services at Montpelier came under the control of the Western Region of British Railways. Staff levels were reduced further, down to two booking clerks, four porters, a checker and a weighbridge operator by 1950. Service levels had decreased slightly by 1955 to 28 towards Avonmouth and 29 towards Bristol, but the services were at regular intervals. Passenger numbers however dropped sharply in 1961 as the result of a fare increase, and so in 1962 a new reduced timetable was enacted, which lost more passengers. A year later in 1963, the Beeching report suggested the complete withdrawal of services along the line, but ultimately only those beyond Severn Beach or via Henbury were withdrawn. The goods yard at Montpelier closed on 18 November 1965, with the signal box following on 10 May 1967. Staff were completely withdrawn on 17 July 1967 with tickets issued by the train guard. The general reduction in passenger traffic, as well as the transfer of Avonmouth goods traffic to the Henbury Loop Line, allowed the removal of the northern track from 19 October 1970, with all services using the southern platform. The former goods yard is now a small industrial estate. By 1974, service had reduced to 19 trains per day in each direction, with no Sunday services beyond Avonmouth.

British Rail was split into business-led sectors in the 1980s, at which time operations at Montpelier passed to Regional Railways. At this time, all trains ran to Severn Beach, but the service pattern was irregular. This changed in 1995 when an hourly timetable was introduced for peak times, but northbound services were terminated at Avonmouth.

When the railway was privatised in 1997, local services were franchised to Wales & West, which was succeeded by Wessex Trains, an arm of National Express, in 2001. Following action by Friends of Severn Beach Railway (FOSBR) and a string of protests, services had increased to 10 per day in each direction by 2005, with Bristol City Council providing a subsidy to Wessex Trains. The Wessex franchise was amalgamated with the Great Western franchise into the Greater Western franchise from 2006, and responsibility passed to First Great Western, a subsidiary company of FirstGroup, rebranded as Great Western Railway in 2015. A minimum service requirement was written into the franchise agreement, ensuring an hourly service along the line, and this has since been increased to three trains every two hours (24 trains per day). Sunday services to Severn Beach were restored in 2010.

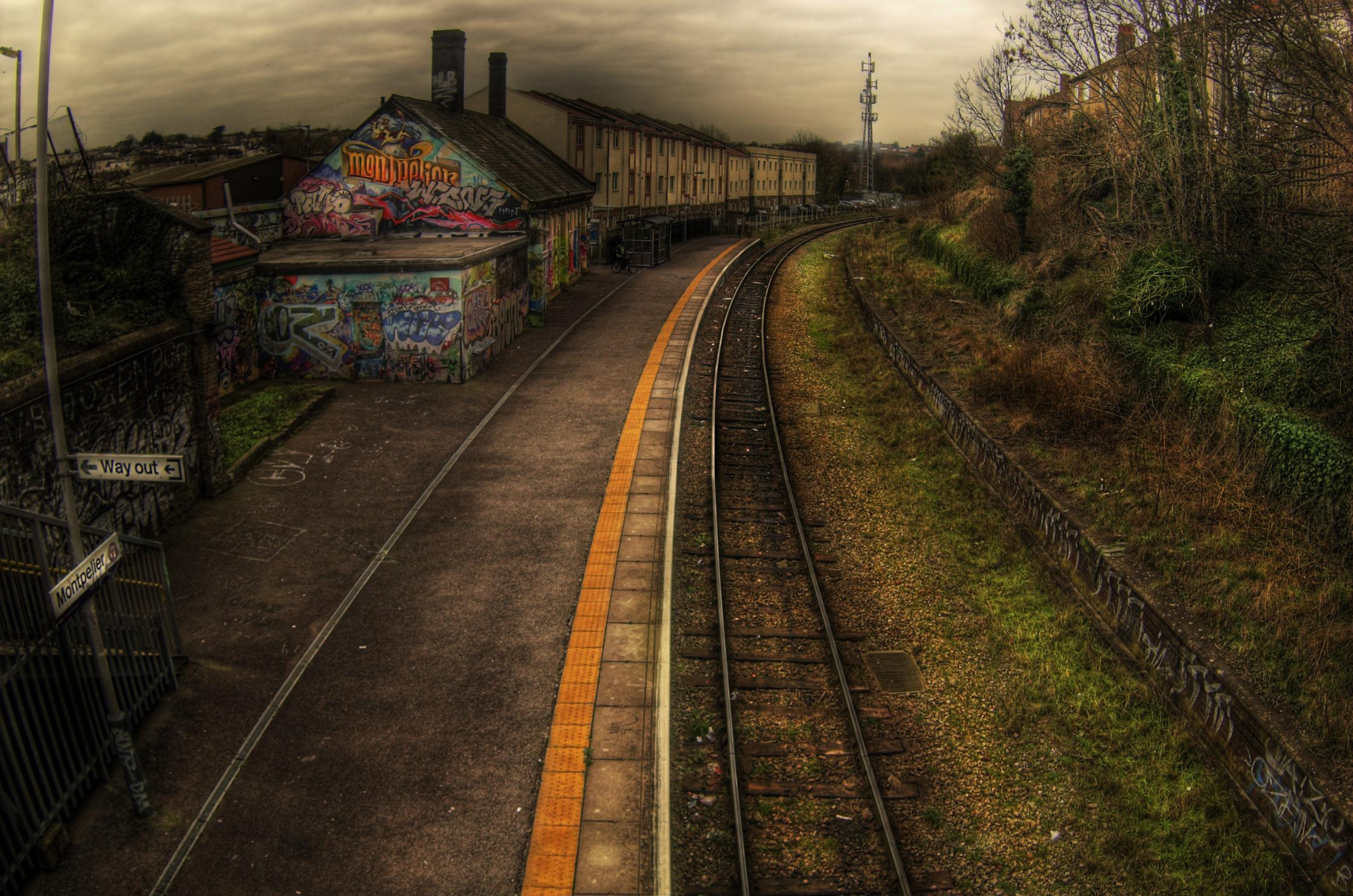
The station building at Montpelier is not in railway use, and is covered in a community-painted mural. The northern platform (right) is disused.

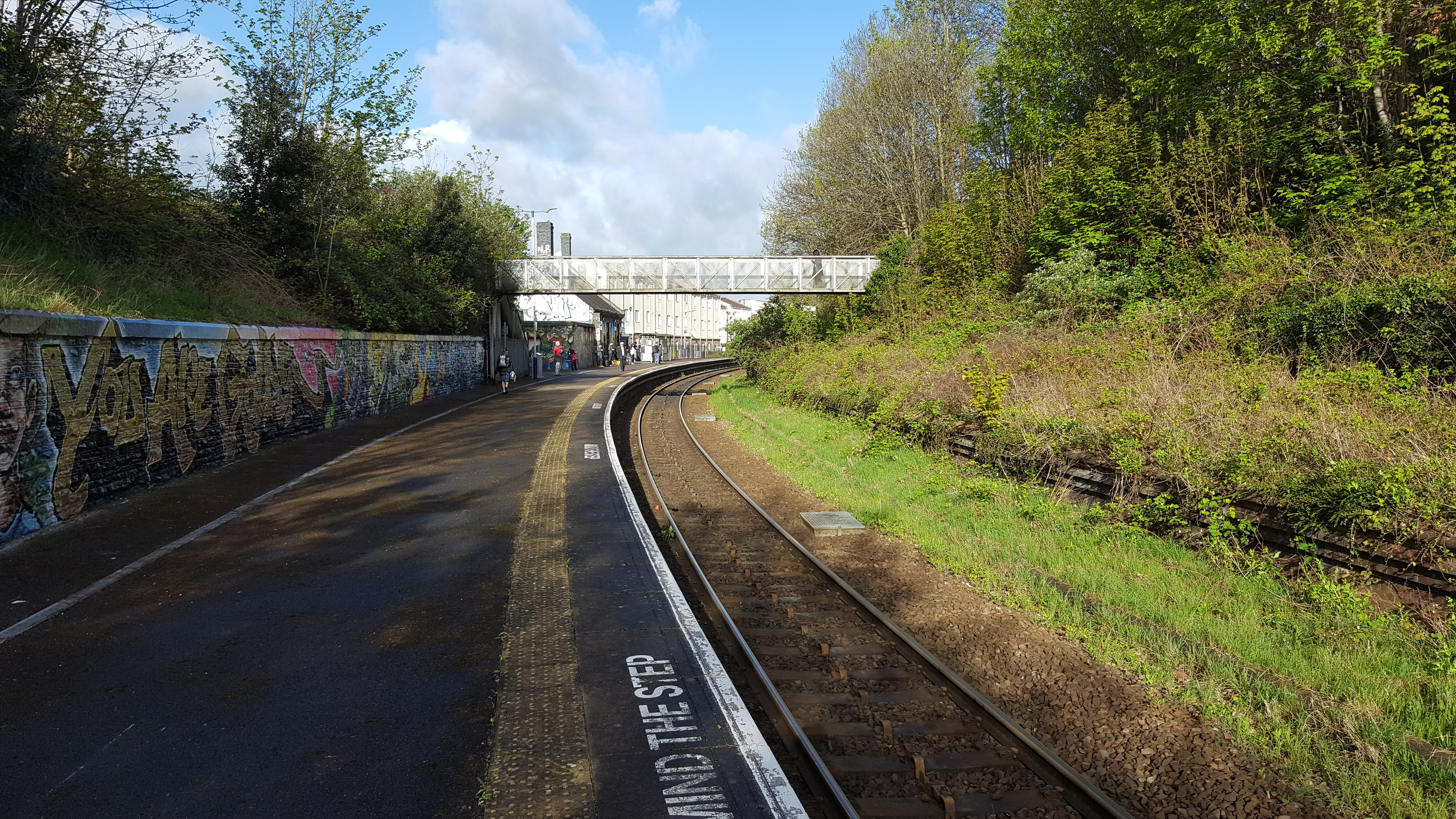
Montpelier Station looking west, showing footbridge and recently extended mural

In 2004, the Severnside Community Rail Partnership was formed, covering the Severn Beach Line and a network of routes radiating from Bristol. By 2008, they had created a support group for the station, were helping with station upkeep, and had improved the provision of timetabling information through the use of simplified departure timetable posters. In 2007, they repainted the mural on the old station building, but it was defaced by vandals the same year. First Great Western offered a £500 reward for identifying the persons responsible, and stated they planned to install CCTV cameras. Students from Fairfield High School repainted the mural with help from professional graffiti artist Richard Minchin. Artist Wei Ong repainted the mural in 2015, and it was repainted again in 2017 by street artist Silent Hobo. Customer help points with next train information screens were installed during 2008/09, paid for by money from the Department for Transport's "Access for All" fund and local councils. The help points were stolen in early 2010, but have since been replaced. A large number of trees north of the station, which had provided noise mitigation and stabilised the embankment, were felled in 2018 by local residents, without permission from Network Rail.

Preceding station	Historical railways	Following station
Clifton Down	Midland Railway; Clifton Extension Railway (1874–1897)	Fishponds; Line and station closed.
Redland	Midland Railway; Clifton Extension Railway (1897–1917, 1919–1922)	Fishponds; Line and station closed.
Redland	London, Midland and Scottish Railway; Clifton Extension Railway (1922–1941)	Fishponds; Line and station closed.
Clifton Down	Great Western Railway; Clifton Extension Railway (1874–1897)	Stapleton Road
Redland	Great Western Railway; Clifton Extension Railway (1897–1948)	Stapleton Road
Redland	Western Region of British Railways; Severn Beach Line (1948–1982)	Stapleton Road
Redland	Regional Railways; Severn Beach Line (1982–1997)	Stapleton Road
Redland	Wales & West; Severn Beach Line (1997–2001)	Stapleton Road
Redland	Wessex Trains; Severn Beach Line (2001–2006)	Stapleton Road

== Future ==
First Great Western declined a contractual option to continue the Greater Western passenger franchise (of which services at Montpelier are a part) beyond 2013, citing a desire for a longer-term contract due to the impending upgrade to the Great Western Main Line. The franchise was put out to tender, but the process was halted and later scrapped due to the fallout from the collapse of the InterCity West Coast franchise competition. A two-year franchise extension until September 2015 was agreed in October 2013, and subsequently extended until March 2019.

With the upgrade to the Great Western Main Line, the main line from London to Bristol was due to be electrified by 2016. However, the electrification was never intended to extend beyond the main lines, and electrification into Bristol Temple Meads was indefinitely delayed in 2016, so Montpelier will continue to be served by diesel trains, with the "Sprinter" units replaced by Class 165 and 166 "Turbo" units. Stephen Williams, MP for Bristol West, questioned whether electrification could continue to Montpelier and the rest of the Severn Beach Line. Then-Secretary of State for Transport Philip Hammond replied that it would have to be looked at in the future. The group Friends of Suburban Bristol Railways supports the electrification of the entire Severn Beach Line.

Improved services at Montpelier are called for as part of the Greater Bristol Metro scheme, a rail transport plan which aims to enhance transport capacity in the Bristol area. There is an aspiration for half-hourly services, with trains towards Bristol terminating alternately at Portishead and Bath Spa, however due to the large sections of the Severn Beach Line which are single-track and to the congested main line from Temple Meads, such frequency is not currently feasible. The scheme was given the go-ahead in July 2012 as part of the City Deal, whereby local councils would be given greater control over money by the government. There are also calls for the reopening of the Henbury Loop Line, which could allow a direct service from Montpelier to Bristol Parkway via Avonmouth. Plans for a loop were rejected by the West of England Joint Transport Board, however Bristol City Councillors voted to send the decision back to the board for further discussion.

== Incidents ==
A crash occurred at the station on 14 May 1878, when a train from Mangotsfield to Clifton Down hit a goods train which had been shunting at the station. Several of the goods train's wagons were smashed or overturned, and the railway was severely damaged.

== See also ==
- Rail services in the West of England
