= Redlands Airfield =

- IATA: none; ICAO: none

Summary
- Airport type: Private
- Owner: Joe and Sarah Smith (formerly)
- Serves: Wanborough, Wiltshire, England
- Location: Near Wanborough, Wiltshire, England
- Opened: 1980s
- Closed: September 2019
- Coordinates: 51°32′N 1°43′W
- Interactive map of Redlands Airfield

Redlands Airfield (X2SN) was an unlicensed private grass-strip airfield near Wanborough, just east of Swindon, Wiltshire, England, which operated from the 1980s until 2019.

== History ==
Redlands Airfield started as a small microlight club in the 1980s, on land which was part of Redlands Farm. Flying ceased after neighbours objected to noise, then the airfield re-opened in July 1998 after being granted planning permission by Swindon Borough Council for a microlight flying club. Operations expanded to include microlight training and, in 2000, skydiving.

Organisations based at the airfield included Cloudbase Microlighting, Clearprop Microlight School and Skydive London.

== Planning issues ==
In 2009 Joe and Sarah Smith, who own the airfield, were granted planning permission by Swindon Borough Council to continue its operations after the council was threatened with a judicial review for its attempt to re-write planning conditions.

The development of Redlands Farm into an airfield hosting microlights, microlight training and skydiving has not met with universal approval in Swindon and North Wiltshire. Since 2000 several campaign groups have fought development (Stop the Plane Campaign and Residents Against Redlands). In 2012 the Chair of Swindon Borough Council Planning Committee, Dale Heenan (a Councillor for Covingham, an area which is overflown) said "As a result of the debate on the report, I have written to the two Swindon MP’s, Justin Tomlinson and Robert Buckland, in my capacity as Committee Chairman, to ask for their support to see local planning authorities having the ability to control aviation related noise from unlicensed airfields, and ensure flight paths do not occur over residential areas."

In reviewing the measures available to address this issue, Swindon Borough Council found it is limited in any involvement with aircraft noise when the aircraft is in the air. From a nuisance perspective this comes under s.79(1)(ga) of the Environmental Protection Act 1990 or the Noise Act 1996 (with the exception of model aircraft). This means that aircraft noise in the air is excluded by law from the control of Local Authorities, and is instead regulated by the Civil Aviation Authority through the certification of aircraft in the UK. Local Authorities must regulate aviation noise nuisance through the initial planning permission or must act subsequently by issuing a discontinuance notice with the permission of the Secretary of State.

In 2012, local residents continued to object to skydiving at Redlands, and council planning officers indicated that the airfield might be included in Swindon's "eastern villages" expansion.

== Closure ==
The airfield closed in September 2019, and in 2020 the 48-acre farm was sold to two housebuilders.
