= Gemmill =

Gemmill is a surname. Notable people with the surname include:

- Archie Gemmill (born 1947), Scottish international footballer
- James Fairlie Gemmill FRSE (1867-1926) Scottish physician
- Jane Gemmill, MBE (1855-1943), Scottish temperance activist
- John Gemmill, English businessman and the first auctioneer of the Colony of Singapore
- R. Scott Gemmill (fl. 1990s–2020s), American television writer and producer
- Scot Gemmill (born 1971), Scottish international footballer, son of Archie, whose clubs include Nottingham Forest and Everton
- Scott Gemmill (born 1987), Scottish footballer, whose clubs have included Berwick Rangers and Clyde
- Tristan Gemmill (born 1967), English actor
- Willard Gemmill (1875–1935), Justice of the Indiana Supreme Court

== See also ==
- Gemmill Fountain, first public drinking fountain in Singapore
- Gemmell, a surname
