= Gemmell =

Gemmell is a Scottish surname. Notable people with the surname include:

- Alan Gemmell (1913–1986), Scottish biologist
- Alan Gemmell (born 1978), British co-founder of FiveFilms4Freedom and former Director of the British Council in India
- Andrew Gemmell (born 1991), American swimmer
- Andy Gemmell (born 1945), Scottish footballer
- Archibald Gemmell (1869–1945), Canadian politician
- David Gemmell (1948–2006), British writer
- Dean Gemmell (born 1967), Canadian-American curler
- Dick Gemmell (1936–2017), British rugby player
- George Gemmell (1889–1965), British footballer
- Ian Gemmell (born 1953), English cricketer
- Jimmy Gemmell (1880–?), Scottish footballer
- Keith Gemmell (1948–2016), British musician
- Kris Gemmell (born 1977), New Zealand triathlete
- Nikki Gemmell (born 1966), Australian author
- Rice Gemmell (1896–1972), Australian tennis player
- Ruth Gemmell (born 1967), British actress
- Tommy Gemmell (1943–2017), Scottish football player and manager
- Tommy Gemmell (footballer, born 1930) (1930–2004), Scottish footballer
- Welland Gemmell (1910–1954), Canadian politician

== See also ==
- Gemmell, Minnesota
- Gemmells, South Australia
- Gemmill (disambiguation)
