= 1918 Birthday Honours (MBE) =

This is a list of Member of the Order of the British Empire (MBE) awards in the 1918 Birthday Honours.

The 1918 Birthday Honours were appointments by King George V to various orders and honours to reward and highlight good works by citizens of the British Empire. The appointments were made to celebrate the official birthday of The King, and were published in The London Gazette in early June 1918.

The recipients of honours are displayed here as they were styled before their new honour, and arranged by honour, with classes (Knight, Knight Grand Cross, etc.) and then divisions (Military, Civil, etc.) as appropriate.

== Member of the Order of the British Empire (MBE) awards ==
- Major Charles Reginald Abbott — Staff Officer, 2nd Class, Royal Air Force
- John Dixon Abbott — Partner, Motor Rail and Tram Car Co., Ltd.
- Captain Ivor Yorath Acraman — Canal Superintendent, Manchester
- John Stockton Adamson — Commandant of Voluntary Aid Detachments, West Lancashire
- Fred Adcock — Technical Assistant, Directorate of Fortifications and Works, War Office
- Commissioned Armourer Ernest Addy RN
- Major Eustace Montagu Lafone Ainslie — Controller of a Reception Park, Aeroplane Supply Depot, Royal Air Force
- Agnes Mary Aitchison — Financial Branch, Coal Mines Department, Board of Trade
- Andrew Aitken JP Member of Ayrshire Local Tribunal
- Violet May Alcock — Higher Grade Clerk, War Trade Department
- Sarah Julia Warde-Aldam — Commandant, Hooton Pagnell Auxiliary Hospital, Doncaster
- George Alder — Ermin's Floating Dock Company, Middlesbrough
- Henry George Randall Aldridge — Organiser and Officer in charge, Sidney House and Eastfield Auxiliary Hospitals, Hampshire
- William Frederick Aldridge— Supervising Clerk, War Office
- Samuel Grant Alexander JP Honorary Secretary, Inverness-shire Branch, Scottish Branch, British Red Cross Society
- Captain James Craig Allan — Appeal National Service Representative, Lanarkshire
- Major Michael Henry Percival Allen — Staff Officer, 2nd Class, Royal Air Force
- Ephraim Allinson — Superintendent and Chief Clerk, East Riding Police
- Thomas Allison —Station Superintendent, Glasgow, Caledonian Railway
- Horace Benjamin Allum — Staff Clerk, Supplies Division, HM Office of Works.
- Philip Fermor Ambrose — Superintendent, Kent County Police
- Captain Fulcher Amey — Officer in charge of Equipment Branch, Inspection Department, Woolwich, Ministry of Munitions
- Lillian Eva Amy — Welfare Supervisor, Messrs. C. A. Vandervell & Co.
- Charles Anderson — Honorary Secretary, West Hartlepool War Savings Committee
- Charles James Anderson — Section Director, Finance Department, Ministry of Munitions
- Daisy Kate Anderson — In charge of Typists Section, Contracts Directorate, War Office
- George Anderson — Actuary of the Preston Trustee Savings Bank; Honorary Secretary to the Trustee Savings Banks Association
- Lieutenant Percy Anderson — Mechanical Warfare (Overseas and Allies) Department, Ministry of Munitions
- Major Cyril Rogers Andrews — Staff Officer, 2nd Class, Royal Air Force
- Major George Henry Andrews — For services with the British Expeditionary Force, Salonika
- Horace George Andrews — Accountant-General's Department, Admiralty
- Lieutenant Geoffrey Edmund Appleby — For an act of gallantry not in the presence of the enemy
- Thomas William Archer — Acting Torpedo Store Officer, Torpedo Store Department, Admiralty
- Second Lieutenant Thomas Armitstead — For an act of gallantry not in the presence of the enemy
- Robert Bayles Armstrong — Assistant Manager, Engineering Side, Messrs. Hawthorn, Leslie & Co.
- Second Lieutenant Thomas Edward Steele Armstrong — For services with the British Expeditionary Force, Mesopotamia
- Henry George Arnold — Victualling Store Officer, Royal Victoria Yard, Deptford
- Mary Adelaide Ashford — Welfare Superintendent at one of the establishments of Messrs. Kynoch, Limited
- George Kerfoot Ashton — Chief Special Constable, Manchester Special Constabulary
- 2nd Lieutenant William Thomas Finley Atherton — Anti-Aircraft Defences, Home Forces
- Dorothea Atkinson — Commandant, Walden Place Auxiliary Hospital, Essex
- Lucy Mary Montagu Atkinson — Quarter Master, Devizes Auxiliary Hospital
- William Edward Audland MRCS LRCP Assistant County Director, Northamptonshire, British Red Cross and Order of St. John of Jerusalem
- Captain Arthur Lintott Aylmer — Honorary Treasurer, Camps Library
- Henry John Ayres — Clerk, War Office
- Edith Frances Backhouse — In charge of Typing Section, Adastral House (War Office)
- Cyril Bailey — Sub-Section Director, Labour Department, Ministry of Munitions
- Sidney Alfred Bailey — Minor Staff Clerk and Establishment Officer, National Health Insurance Commission (England)
- Major William Edward Bailey — Officer Clerk, War Office
- Elizabeth Margaret Baillie
- John William Owen Baines — Director of Flour and Bread Section, Ministry of Food
- Constance Kennedy Baird — Officer in charge, Transport of Relatives of Wounded Department, Le Touquet, France
- Atheling Herbert Baker — Inspector (Honorary), Department of Surveyor-General of Supply, War Office
- Lieutenant Frank Clement Ball — Anti-Aircraft Defences, Home Forces
- Louisa Orme Bamford — Quarter Master, Ashbourne Auxiliary Hospital, Derbyshire
- James Bancroft — Works Manager, Messrs. Howard and Bullough, Limited
- David Armitage Bannerman — Assistant Secretary to Red Cross Commissioner, France
- Lieutenant Louis Walter Barber — For an act of gallantry not in the presence of the enemy
- Evelyn Barker — Honorary Secretary, Clothing and Comforts Depot, Dublin, British Red Cross and Order of St. John of Jerusalem
- Harold Hastings Barker — Special Assistant Chemist, Inspection Department, Woolwich, Ministry of Munitions
- Lucy Marjorie Kathleen Pratt-Barlow — Unit Administrator, Queen Mary's Army Auxiliary Corps
- Captain Geoffrey Arthur Barnett — Deputy Assistant Adjutant-General, Egyptian Expeditionary Force
- Samuel Henry Gilmore Barnett — Works Manager at a National Shell Factory
- Stephen Allen Barns — Senior Temporary Assistant Technical Examiner of Works, War Office
- Hilda Madeleine Baron — Commandant, Alford Auxiliary Hospital, North Lincolnshire
- Ernest Wilfred Edwards Barton — Voluntary Driver, Motor Ambulance Convoy, British Red Cross, Italy
- John William Abell Bassett JP Mayor of Burton-on-Trent; Chairman of the National Service Committee
- Edward Batch — Assistant Controller of Timber Supplies (Overseas Purchases Branch), Board of Trade
- Mary Bate — Superintendent at a Munition Workers' Canteen
- Charles William Bates — Secretary for the Salonika Area, YMCA
- Janet Mary Batger — Acting Chief Lady Supervisor — Directorate of Mobilisation, War Office
- Beatrix Marguerite Batten — Commandant, Abbey Lodge Hospital, Chislehurst
- Warrant Shipwright John Thomas Batten RN
- Winifred Eleanor
- Sarah Batten — Voluntary Aid Detachment Commandant, Staples, British Red Cross Commission, France
- Lieutenant George Henry Batty — Confidential Clerk to the Director of Military Operations, War Office
- Edward Swayn Bayliss — Acting Contract Officer, Contract Department, Admiralty
- Gilbert Thomas Bayliss — General Manager, Small Arm Ammunition Department, Messrs. Rudge-Whitworth, Limited
- Charlotte Augusta Baynes — Superintendent, Catholic Women's League Huts, France
- Warwick Henry Beanes — Technical Assistant, Messrs. Perkins Engineers, Limited
- Richard Frith Beard — Chief Aliens Officer, Swansea
- John Millar Beattie — Manager at a National Shell Factory
- Captain Arthur Edward Beecroft — Signal Services, Home Forces
- Donald Glassford Begg — Honorary Secretary, River Plate Contingent Committee, British Red Cross Society
- Charles David Jarrett Bell — Acting Constructor, Admiralty
- Kathleen Audrey Danvers Bainbridge-Bell — Assistant in Parliamentary Branch, Ministry of Food
- 2nd Lieutenant Lee Bell — For an act of gallantry not in the presence of the enemy
- Florence Sarah Benjamin — Superintendent, Bandages Department, Central Workrooms, British Red Cross Society
- William Roger Bennett — Clerk, War Office
- Bessie Benson — For Munition Canteen Work in Ireland
- Charles Frederick Delaval Beresford — British Vice-Consul, Cherbourg
- Mary Ann Berry — Assistant Controller of Inspection, Queen Mary's Army Auxiliary Corps
- William Edmund Bethell — Manager, The Cotton Powder Co., Ltd.
- Nora Magdalen Bickley — Treasury Solicitor's Department, Law Courts Branch
- Eleanor, Lady Biddulph — Head of Records Department, Central Prisoners of War Committee
- Christina Turnbull Bilton — Matron, 28 General Hospital, Salonika Expeditionary Force
- Annie Janet Binnie — Record Clerk, France, British Red Cross Commission
- Aubrey Brian Binns — Chief of Technical Department, Messrs. Swan, Hunter & Wigham Richardson
- Captain Wyndham Lindsay Birch — West Yorkshire Regiment, attached Royal Air Force
- Lieutenant Douglas Joseph Bird — For an act of gallantry not in the presence of the enemy
- Hugh Birrell — Temporary Secretary to His Britannic Majesty's Minister, Christiania
- Philip Birtwistle — Technical Assistant, Machine Tool Department, Ministry of Munitions
- Richard Winsor Bishop — Company Commander, Norwich Special Constabulary
- Major Gordon Boyes Black — Canadian Forestry Corps
- Captain Mortimer Charles Blackett — Staff Captain of a Training Brigade, Australian Imperial Force
- Ida Louisa Blackman — Quarter Master, Normanhurst Auxiliary Hospital, Battle, Sussex
- Harry Cooper Blackwell — Chief Inspector, Birmingham City Police
- Hilda Blackwell — Private Secretary to Con-joint Secretary, Ministry of National Service
- Atholl Blair — Boiler Shop and Foundry Manager, Messrs. Harland & Wolff
- Robert Blair — Messrs. McKie & Baxter, Glasgow
- Mary Blamires — Huddersfield and District Women's Committee for Soldiers and Sailors
- Robert Blaylock — Works Manager, Messrs. Darlington Forge Company, Darlington
- Gertrude Alice Bliss — Honorary Secretary, Streatham Division, British Red Cross Society
- Captain Frank Robert Bloor — For services with the British Expeditionary Force, Salonika
- Mary Blount — Dublin Local War Pensions Committee
- The Hon. Ethel Jane Blyth — Commandant, Grange Auxiliary Hospital, Surrey
- Daniel Roberts Bolt — Voluntary Worker for Belgian Refugees, Poplar and Stepney
- Lieutenant-Colonel Edwin Bolton — Member of the Stirling Local Tribunal
- James Ryding Bond — Secretary and Executive Officer, Derbyshire War Agricultural Executive Committee
- Mary Baxter Bonhote — Assistant to Legal Adviser and Secretary of Orders Committee, Ministry of Food
- William Frederic Bonser — Chairman of the Central Sub-Advisory Committee (Recruiting), City of London
- Harold Robert Yerburgh-Bonsey — Divisional Commander, Metropolitan Special Constabulary
- Madge Boosey — Commandant, Oakley Auxiliary Hospital, Bromley, Kent
- Maud Booth — Honorary Secretary, Lancaster War Pensions Local Committee
- Robert Gordon Borland — Civil Engineering Assistant — Directorate of Fortifications and Works, War Office
- Lieutenant Thomas Albert Edward James Bosanquet RN
- Emma Boulnois — Organising Superintendent of a Canteen for Government Clerks, YMCA
- Thomas William Bourn — National Service Representative, Newcastle
- Elizabeth Bowles — Commandant, Lydney Auxiliary Hospital, Gloucestershire
- Alfred Thomas Bowman — Clerk, War Office
- Charles Bowyer — Coal Mines Department, Board of Trade
- Anne Jamieson Boyd — Hospitality Fund for Travelling Soldiers and Sailors, Edinburgh
- Florence Adelia Brackenbury — Chairman, Lincoln (Lindsey) Women's War Agricultural Committee
- Captain Stanley Goodwin Bradshaw — Appeal National Service Representative
- Edwin Lewton-Brain — Acting First Assistant Electrical Engineer, Department of Director of Dockyards and Repairs, Admiralty
- Lieutenant Hugh Gerner Brain — Deputy Assistant Adjutant-General, Administrative Headquarters, Australian Imperial Force
- Ethel Primrose Brake — Ministry of National Service
- Percy Bramwell — Deputy Assistant Inspector of Seaplanes, Aeronautical Inspection, Ministry of Munitions
- Gertrude Ethel Brander — Higher Grade Woman Clerk, Ministry of Shipping
- Captain David Bremner — Master of a Transport
- Vincent Talbot Brennan — Accountant-General's Department, Admiralty
- Lieutenant Thomas Stamp Brewis — Senior Port Officer, Expeditionary Force Canteens
- Mary Helen Thorpe Brice — Higher Grade Clerk, Acton Employment Exchange, Ministry of Labour
- Charles Brickenden — Chief Cartographer, Naval Intelligence Division, Admiralty
- Stanley Alexander Bridger — Foreman of the Yard, Gibraltar
- Owen Brien — Superintendent, Royal Irish Constabulary
- Elsie Baron Briggs — Deputy Assistant Inspector of Fuzes, Ministry of Munitions
- Gwendoline Mary Brill — Lady Supervisor, War Office
- Arthur William Brodie — First Class Assistant Accountant, Finance Department, War Office
- Rhoda Brodie — Honorary Secretary, Croydon Borough Association of Honorary Workers
- Alice Brooks — In charge of General Service Department, County Director's Office, County of London, Order of St. John of Jerusalem
- Captain Louis Egerton Broome — Deputy Assistant Director of Inland Water Transport, Egyptian Expeditionary Force
- Frederick Harry Broomfield — Principal Electrical Cable Overseer, Department of the Director of Electrical Engineering, Admiralty
- Albert Thomas Brown — Timber Supplies Department, Board of Trade
- Lieutenant Cecil Norman Brown — Anti-Aircraft Defences, Home Forces
- Cicely Leadley-Brown — Welfare Supervisor at a National Projectile Factory
- Cuthbert Brown — District Surveyor, Edmonton
- David Brown — Chief Draughtsman, Shipyard, Messrs. Vickers, Ltd., Barrow
- Lieutenant Everard Kenneth Brown — Northern Command, Home Forces
- Lieutenant Geoffrey William Brown — Administrative Officer and Assistant Adjutant at a School of Instruction
- Lieutenant George Thomas Brown — Canadian Army Medical Corps
- Harry Percy Brown — Assistant Staff Engineer, General Post Office
- Margaret Bennett Brown — Commandant-in-Charge, Murrell Hill Auxiliary Hospital, Carlisle
- Mary Louisa Hester Clerke-Brown — Commandant, Swyncombe House Auxiliary Hospital, Watlington, Henley-on-Thames
- Reginald Brown — President, Southall and District Horticultural Society
- Charles Brudenell-Bruce — Temporary Secretary to His Britannic Majesty's Minister, Christiania
- Elizabeth Bruce — Head of the Clerical Staff, War Trade Intelligence Department
- Emma Jane Bryning — Chief Superintendent of Typists, War Office
- Rhoda Agnes Buchanan — Brentford Local War Pensions Committee
- Frank Steele Buck — Assistant, Establishment Branch, Explosives Supply Department, Ministry of Munitions
- Margaret Buck — Housekeeper in Charge of Nurses Home, New Zealand Convalescent Hospital, Hornchurch
- Ethel Agnes Buckle — Donor and Manager of two Coffee Stalls with the British Expeditionary Force, France
- Mildred Emily Bulkley — Woman Welfare Officer, Birmingham, Ministry of Munitions
- Gertrude Bullen — Voluntary Aid Detachment, New Zealand General Hospital, Brockenhurst
- Ralph, Bullock — Divisional Commander, Metropolitan Special Constabulary
- William Henry Bunch — Works Manager at a National Shell Factory
- Michael Bunney — Assistant Director, Chemical Section, Trench Warfare Supply Department, Ministry of Munitions
- Senior Mate Walter Patrick Burden RN
- Walter Chapman Burder JP Commandant, Voluntary Aid Detachment 24, and Chairman of Loughborough General Hospital, Leicestershire
- Cecil Charles Burleigh — Assistant Director of Feeding, Stuffs, Ministry of Food
- Louisa Joan Burne — Organiser of Hostels for Workers at 3rd London General Hospital, and of Central Joint Voluntary Aid Detachment Hostel
- William Hodgson Burnet — Architectural Assistant, 1st Class, HM Office of Works
- Lieutenant David Alexander Burrage — For an act of gallantry not in the presence of the enemy
- John Harold Burridge MRCS LRCP Commandant and Medical Officer in Charge, Slough Auxiliary Hospital
- Frank Playfair Burt — Senior Lecturer in Chemistry at Manchester University; Chief Assistant to Deputy Inspector of High Explosives, Manchester, Ministry of Munitions
- George Henry Butcher — Tractor Representative for Herefordshire Food Production Department
- Sidney Herbert Butcher— Master of Bermondsey Workhouse.
- Harold Butler — Partner, Messrs. J. Butler & Co.
- Francis Pratt Caird — Inspecting Engineer, Machine Tool Department, Ministry of Munitions
- Major Bruce McGregor Caldwell — Officer in Charge of Canadian Postal Corps
- David Caldwell — Outside Foreman Engineer, Messrs. John G. Kincaid and Co., Ltd., Greenock
- Rupert Harry Calvert — Non-Ferrous Materials Supply Department, Ministry of Munitions
- William Scott Cameron Secretary to the Inspection Committee of Trustee Savings Banks
- Annie Campbell Campbell
- Lieutenant Frederick Harold Campbell — For an act of gallantry not in the presence of the enemy
- Henry Kenyon Campbell — Secretary, East Cumberland Munitions Board of Management
- William Robert Campbell — Ministry of National Service
- Edith Frances Carbonell — Head of Addressograph Department, Central Prisoners of War Committee, County of London
- Major John Carr — Recruiting Area Commander, Bristol City, Ministry of National Service
- Charles Maurice Carter — Acting Constructor, Department of Director of Naval Construction, Admiralty
- George Carter — Naval Store Department, HM Dockyard, Chatham
- Daisy Olive Cartmail — Honorary Secretary to Matron-in-Chief — Headquarters, British Red Cross Society and Order of St. John of Jerusalem
- Mary Glendinning Carver — Naval Intelligence Division, Admiralty
- Clare Catley — Section Director, Factory Accounts, Ministry of Munitions
- Ida Jessie Causton — Organiser and Commandant, Pinner Auxiliary Hospital, Middlesex
- Samuel Edward Cavan — Chief Clerk to Chief Inspector of Quarter Master-General's Services, War Office
- Charles John Cawood JP Food Production Sub-Commissioner for Yorkshire
- Dora Cayley — General Overlooker, Small Arms Ammunition, Park Royal, Ministry of Munitions
- Frank Chaplin — Member of the City of London Advisory Committee
- Florence Chapman — Quarter Master, Buxton Auxiliary Hospital
- George Russell Chapman — Secretary, Hut Week Department, YMCA
- Edward Hazlehurst Cherry — Assistant Secretary, Navy and Army Canteen Board
- James Childs — Head Iron Foreman, Messrs. Swan, Hunter and Wigham Richardson
- Martha Chippendale — Major, Salvation Army; Secretary of the Naval and Military League
- Helen Gertrude Chune — Quarter Master, Highland Moors Auxiliary Hospital, Llandrindod Wells
- George Charles Churchward — Commission Internationale de Ravitaillement
- Arthur George Chuter — Commission Internationale de Ravitaillement
- Adel Dorothy Claremont — Founder and Honorary Organiser of the Stick Crutch Fund
- Captain D'Arcy Melville Clark — For services with the British Expeditionary Force in France
- Lieutenant John Mactaggart Clark — For an act of gallantry not in the presence of the enemy
- Lieutenant William Morrison Clark — For an act of gallantry not in the presence of the enemy
- Francis William Clarke — Temporary Second Class Clerk, Colonial Office. Harold Claughton, War Office
- Alfred Clegg JP Headmaster of the East Crompton Church of England School, Lancashire; Chairman of the Crompton Urban District Council
- Bella Clegg — Commandant, Bodlondeb Auxiliary Hospital, Menai Bridge, Anglesey
- Ethel Theodora Clegg — Area Controller, Queen Mary's Army Auxiliary Corps
- Fred Clements — Station Master, St. Pancras Station, Midland Railway
- William Clough — Late Organising Officer, Bury Munitions' Board of Management
- Captain Alfred Henry Clucas — For an act of gallantry not in the presence of the enemy
- Millie Gertrude Clutterbuck — Registry, Air Ministry
- Dora Alexandrina Cochran — Joint Women's Voluntary Aid Detachment Department, Devonshire House
- John Alexander Cockburn — Manager of the Manufacturing Division at one of the Factories of Nobel's Explosives Company
- Captain Charles George Coe — Equipment Officer, Royal Air Force
- Charles Henry Cole — Civil Engineer, Admiralty
- Arthur Charles Coleman — Senior Assistant Inspector of Munitions, Pittsburg District, U.S.A., Ministry of Munitions
- Second Lieutenant Colin Goss Coleridge — Royal Air Force
- Captain Thomas Bellasyse Colley — Acting Commandant of Physical and Bayonet Training, Canadian Forces
- Willoughby Collier — Clerk, War Office
- Lieutenant-Commander Abraham Bennett Collins RN Pier Master, Hawes Pier, South Queensferry
- George Alfred Collins — Local Manager of Avonmouth Docks
- John Howarth Collins — Deputy Assistant Inspector of Engines, Aeronautical Inspection, Ministry of Munitions
- Frederick Collis — Personal Assistant to Council Member "S," Ministry of Munitions
- Captain Joseph Leonard Colman — Deputy Assistant Adjutant-General, Australian Imperial Force Depots
- The Hon. George Charles Colville — Secretary to the Sub-Advisory Committee (Recruiting) of the Institute of Chartered Accountants
- Captain Harvey Alexander Brabazon Combe — For services with the British Expeditionary Force in France
- Captain William Connett — Master of a Transport
- Rudolph Consterdine — District Secretary of an Army Area in France, YMCA
- Agnes Ethel Conway — Honorary Secretary of Women's Committee of the Imperial War Museum
- William John Cooke — Yard Master, Norwood Junction, London Brighton and South Coast Railway
- Edward Alfred Coombs — Honorary Treasurer, Kensington War Savings Committee
- Allan Ernest Cooper — Managing Director, Messrs. Allan Cooper & Co.
- Eleanor Valentine Cooper — Quarter Master, "The Cecils" Auxiliary Hospital, Worthing
- Harry Gordon Cooper MRCS LRCP Assistant County Director for Altrincham Division of Cheshire, British Red Cross and Order of St. John of Jerusalem
- Geoffrey Silverwood Cope — Transport Officer and Secretary, King George Hospital, London
- John Reginald Corah — Assistant County Director, Leicestershire, British Red Cross and Order of St. John of Jerusalem
- The Hon. Katharine Corbet — Honorary Lady Superintendent and Organiser, Shropshire Area, YMCA
- Kate Agnes Corner — Superintendent of a National Filling Factory Settlement
- Donald Welldon Corrie — Secretary to London Office of the Imperial Munitions Board
- Mabel Emily Hartridge Cory — Commandant, Fordham Auxiliary Hospital, Cambridgeshire
- Amy Joan Cottell — Member of the British War Mission to the United States of America
- Thomas Sturge Cotterell JP Superintendent, one of HM Magazines, Ministry of Munitions
- George Frederick Cotton — Secretary's Department, Admiralty
- James Temple Cotton — Secretary's Department, Admiralty
- Chief Carpenter John Couper RN
- Paul Evelyn Couratin, Department of Director of Torpedoes and Mining, Admiralty
- Sarah Denton Course — Superintendent, Munition Workers' Canteen, Woolwich
- Eleanor Rosina Court — Superintendent of Copying Department, Foreign Office
- William Brainsford Cowcher — Inspector of Taxes, Board of Inland Revenue
- Norah Louisa Cowley — Member of the British War Mission to the United States of America
- Eleanor Cowling — Superintendent, Cutting-out Department, Central Workrooms, British Red Cross Society, London
- Charles Edwin Cox — Director, Messrs. C. J. King & Sons, Ltd., Stevedores
- Stephen Cox — Assistant Director, Explosives Storage, Explosives Supply Department, Ministry of Munitions
- Captain Russell Coyne — Officer Clerk, War Office
- Nora Frances Elizabeth Cracknell — Shorthand Writer to the Chancellor of the Exchequer
- Major Guy William Cranfield — Staff Officer, 2nd Class, Royal Air Force
- James Crang — General Distribution Branch; Coal Mines Department, Board of Trade
- Alexander Crawford — Messrs. Swan Hunter & Wigham Richardson
- Barbara Grace Rutherford Crawford Medical Officer at one of HM Factories, Ministry of Munitions
- Lieutenant James Crawford — For an act of gallantry not in the presence of the enemy
- Cecil Crawley — Voluntary Aid Detachment and Quarter Master, Cairo, British Red Cross Commission, Egypt
- Isabella Warden Cree — Honorary Secretary — Headquarters Organising Clothing Committee, and Stores and Despatch Committee, Scottish Branch, British Red Cross Society
- John Edwards Cresswell Principal Medical Officer, Suez
- Lucy Davis Cripps Medical Officer at a National Filling Factory
- William Thomas Critchinson — Staff Clerk, Central Control Board (Liquor Traffic)
- Shipwright Lieutenant George Henry Holland Crook RN Barrack Master, Portsmouth
- Ada Crosby — Superintendent, Domestic Staff, City of London Auxiliary Hospital, Finsbury Square
- Captain Charles Garsed Cross — For an act of gallantry not in the presence of the enemy
- Minnie Eleanor Elizabeth Cross — Assistant to Lady Superintendent, Royal Arsenal, Woolwich
- Lieutenant George Gorden Crowe — Officer in Charge, Red Cross Stores and Boats, Kut el Amara, Mesopotamia
- Edith Miriam Croxton — Temporary Officer, Employment Department, Ministry of Labour
- Ethel Annie Lina Pender-Cudlip — Superintendent of Female Labour, Supply Reserve Depot, Deptford Cattle Market
- Amelia Jane Chisholm Culbard — Organiser of Work Parties for Red Cross Work, Sphagnum Moss, and War Dressings, Scottish Branch, British Red Cross Society
- Staff Paymaster John Mason Cumberland RNR Collector of Customs and Excise, Port of Dover
- Edith Usher Cunningham — Organiser and Head of Red Cross Work. Depot, Birkenhead
- William Darling Cuthbertson — Archivist to His Britannic Majesty's Embassy, Paris
- Sophie Portlock Dadson — Commandant, Gilford House Auxiliary Hospital, Roehampton
- Winifred Dakyns — Assistant Director, Women's Royal Naval Service
- Emily Marion Dalmahoy
- Captain Norman Howard Maxwell Dalston — Quarter Master, No. 2 New Zealand General Hospital, Walton-on-Thames
- Amy Daly — Commandant, The Warren Auxiliary Hospital, Leamington
- The Hon. Florence Daly — Commandant, Manor House Auxiliary Hospital, Folkestone
- Margaret Darby — Commandant, No. 6 Ward, Derby Royal Infirmary
- Charlotte Tarry Darker — Honorary Secretary, Reading War Savings Committee
- Captain Thomas Noah Darnell — Master, Mercantile Marine
- Captain Sidney Lewes Dashwood — Brigade Wireless Organisation Officer, Royal Air Force
- Surendra Kumar Datta — YMCA. Worker with Indian Troops in France
- Mabel Agues Daubeny — Local War Pensions Committee, Clifton
- Morgan Edwin David JP Chairman, Swansea Rural Local Tribunal
- Elizabeth Davidson — Divisional Secretary for Hampstead West, County of London Branch, British Red Cross Society
- John Hay Davidson — Assistant Traffic Manager, Highland Railway
- Ashton Davies — Assistant to the Superintendent of the Line, Lancashire and Yorkshire Railway
- David Gordon Davies — Personal Assistant to Controller of Iron and Steel Production, Ministry of Munitions
- Dorothy Kevill-Davies — Honorary Secretary, Herefordshire Horticultural Committee
- Ivor Davies — Lloyd's Agent, Algiers
- Owen Davies — Steel Works Manager, Messrs. W. Gilbertson and Co., Ltd.
- Thomas Davies — Farmer
- William Davies — Director, Messrs. Lane and MacAndrew
- Charles Davis
- Harry Lewer Davis — Minor Staff Clerk, Contracts Branch, HM Office of Works
- Owen Davis — Commandant of Voluntary Aid Detachments, Dinas Powis and St. Fagans; in charge of Transport of Wounded, Glamorganshire
- Arthur Robert Dawson — Collector of Customs and Excise, Port of Cardiff
- Frederick William Dawson — Secretary, Flour Mills Control Committee, Ministry of Food
- Gertrude Margaret Day — County Organiser, Horticultural Division, Food Production Department
- Mary Ariel Stewart Deacon Medical Officer at a Filling Factory, Ministry of Munitions
- Captain Basil Dean — Head of Entertainment Branch, Army and Navy Canteen Board
- Major Robert Deane — Officer Commanding South African Discharge Depot, Bordon
- Lieutenant Cornelius Thomas Dempsey — Railway Traffic Officer, Australian Imperial Force
- H. A. Dennis — Superintendent of a YMCA Hut at a Munitions Factory
- Norah Denny — Wounded and Missing Enquiry Department, British Red Cross Society
- Ethel Mary Devereux — Commandant, Tewkesbury Auxiliary Hospital, Gloucestershire
- Octavius Pelly Dick — Commission Internationale de Ravitaillement
- Archibald Alexander George Dickey Organiser, Colne Auxiliary Hospital, East Lancashire
- James Dickie — Dock Manager, Messrs. Palmer's Shipbuilding Co., Ltd., Hebburn
- Emily Frances Dickinson — Commandant, Military Block, Essex County Hospital, Colchester
- William Dickinson — Foreman Engineer, Messrs. Swan Hunter and Wigham Richardson
- The Rev. Anthony Edward Denny Disney — Chairman, Hinckley Rural Tribunal
- Horace Dive — First Class Clerk, London Telephone Service
- Selina Dix — Head Mistress of the Girls' Department of the Wheatley Street Council School, Coventry
- Evelyn Hilda Dixey — Quarter Master, Malvern Auxiliary Hospital
- Peter Dodd — Borough Surveyor, Wandsworth
- Charles Money Dodwell — Accountant-General's Department, Admiralty
- David Doig JP Ex-Provost of the Burgh of Dunoon; Chairman of the Dunoon Local Tribunal
- Cecile Donald — Commandant, Chadwick Auxiliary Hospital, Carlisle
- Ethel Maud Donald — Personal Assistant to Deputy Controller, Gun Ammunition Manufacture, Ministry of Munitions
- Lieutenant John Dooley RN
- Lieutenant Raymond Dooley — Adjutant of a Command Depot, Australian Imperial Force
- Artificer Engineer Frederick George Doughty RN
- James William Dow — Assistant Works Manager, North Eastern Railway
- Edward Maxwell Dower — Head of Section of Brewing Branch, Ministry of Food
- John Henry Downs — Sub-Section Director, Iron and Steel Department, Ministry of Munitions
- Frank Drake — In charge of Red Cross Motor Boat, East Africa
- Lieutenant Tom Drake — For an act of gallantry not in the presence of the enemy
- Henrietta Dorothy Drew — Welfare Supervisor, The Coventry Ordnance Works, Limited
- Gertrude Louise Drower — Accountant-General's Department, Admiralty
- Charles James Drummond JP Vice-chairman of the Tin Box Trade Board; Trustee of the Friendly Societies Convalescent Homes
- Robert Duckworth — Superintendent, Liverpool City Police
- Lieutenant Edward Joseph Scott-Dudley — Area Musketry Officer
- Victoria Grant Duff — Head of Wounded and Missing Enquiry Bureau, British Red Cross Commission, Alexandria and Canal Zone
- Dorothy Dufton — Assistant, Chemical Warfare Committee, Ministry of Munitions
- George Leopold Duncan — Fourth-Class Manager, Gretna Employment Exchange, Ministry of Labour
- Captain George Wilson Duncan MC Ministry of National Service
- Harry William Dunk — Controller of Rolling Stock, South Eastern and Chatham Railway
- Walter Charles Durrant — Area Meat Agent, Ministry of Food
- Henry John Eastcott — Steel Superintendent, Materials and Priority Department, Admiralty
- Charles Esau Eastick — Manager and Head Chemist, Messrs. Martineau's, Ltd., Sugar Refiners
- Captain Wilberforce Vaughan Eaves — Medical Officer, Royal Arsenal, Woolwich
- Edward George Eddy — Honorary Secretary, Kidderminster War Savings Committee
- Major Percy Granville Edge — Staff Officer, 2nd Class, Royal Air Force
- Ethel Edgecombe — Honorary Lady Superintendent, Soldiers' and Sailors' Club, Liverpool
- Captain Beresford Harry Huey Edkins MC Staff Captain, Tank Corps Directorate
- William Stanley Edmonds — Vice-Consul in the Levant Service
- Annie Doulton-Edwards — General Secretary of the Chester Council of Social Welfare
- Ivor Edwards — Stores Manager to the British Red Cross Commission, East Africa
- Christian Mary Egerton — Wounded and Missing Enquiry Department, British Red Cross Society
- Sydney Lipscomb Elborne — Chemist, Inspection of High Explosives, Ministry of Munitions
- Blanche Beatrice Elliott — Private Secretary to the Chief Commissioner for Trade Exemptions, Ministry of National Service
- Minnie Ellis — Honorary Secretary, Portsmouth Division, British Red Cross Society
- Major William Reynolds Ellison — Sub-Section Director, Trench Warfare Supply Department, Ministry of Munitions
- Francis William Elsdon — Foreman, Directorate of Inspection of Guns, Ministry of Munitions
- Annie Esplin — Labour Department, Ministry of Munitions
- Ruth Frances Ethelston — Donor and Officer-in-Charge, The Boiling Auxiliary Hospital, Malpas, Cheshire
- Arthur Ernest Evans JP Services in connection with remounts and recruiting
- Edwin Evans
- Edward Victor Evans — Chief Chemist, South Metropolitan Gas Co., Ltd.
- Gweneth Kate Moy-Evans — Lower Grade Clerk, Sandycroft Exchange, Ministry of Labour
- S. Evans — Acting Deputy Naval Store Officer, Hong Kong
- Elizabeth Mary Evens — Commandant, Foye House Auxiliary Hospital, Leigh Woods, Somersetshire
- Henry Robert Fanner — Clerk to the Southend Local Tribunal
- Alice Mary Fathers — Ministry of National Service
- Winifred Mary Feilder — Member of the British War Mission to the United States of America
- Major Ernest Guy Fenwick — British Remount Commission, Canada
- Amy Ferguson — Personal Clerk to chairman and Secretary of the Sugar Commission
- Robert Loftus Fergusson — Sub-Section Director, Inland Transport Department, Ministry of Munitions
- Walter Ferns — Section Director, Gauge Department, Ministry of Munitions
- Lieutenant Pierce Ferris RN
- Mysie Fielden — Chairman, Shropshire Women's War. Agricultural Committee
- Howard Bradley Figgis — Member of the City of London Advisory Committee
- Marie Isabel Finch — Lady Clerk, War Office
- John William Firth — Honorary Adviser, Light Leather Section, Department of Surveyor-General of Supply, War Office
- Thomas Flavell — Manager Wheel Department, Coventry Ordnance Works
- Frederic John Fleming — Works Manager, Messrs. Williamson, Limited
- Lieutenant John William Fletcher — For an act of gallantry not in the presence of the enemy
- John Walter Flower — Proprietor, Messrs. J. W. Flower & Co.. Augusta Frances,
- Lady Augusta Fludyer — Vice-president, Uppingham Division, British Red Cross Society
- Captain Peter Trant Foley — For services with the British Expeditionary Force in France
- Captain Philip Edward Broadley Fooks — Anti-Aircraft Defences, Home Forces
- Phyllis Margaret Foot — Gun Ammunition Department, Ministry of Munitions
- Duncan Forbes Medical Officer of Health, Brighton
- Charles Lee des Forges — Clerk to the Rotherham Local Tribunal
- Second Lieutenant James Edward Foster — For an act of gallantry not in the presence of the enemy
- Thomas Burdall Foster — Foreman in the Carriage and Wagon Department, Midland Railway
- Lieutenant William Foster — Royal Engineers For services with the Egyptian Expeditionary Force
- Alexander Ferdinand Emile Foucar — Assistant Director of Finance and Shipping in the Provisions Branch, Ministry of Food
- Captain Charles Henry Fowler — Section Director, Gun Manufacture Department, Ministry of Munitions
- Captain William Harris Fox — Canadian Army Medical Corps
- Arthur Foxall — Assistant in the Commercial Department, His Britannic Majesty's Legation, Copenhagen
- Arthur Henry Foyster — Assistant Inspector, Small Arms Ammunition, Park Royal, Ministry of Munitions
- Elizabeth Lydia Bult-Francis — Lady Superintendent, YMCA Hut., Ruston Station
- Guy Francis — Honorary Secretary, Denbighshire Local Representative Committee
- Peter Frank — Chief Engineer at one of the establishments of Messrs. Kynoch, Ltd.
- Lilian Annie Margueretta Franklin — Commandant, First Aid Nursing Yeomanry, Calais, Motor Transport Officer, Calais
- K. R. Fraser — Lady Superintendent, YMCA. Hut, Orkney
- Catherine Fraser Medical Officer at one of HM Factories Ministry of Munitions
- Captain Charles Gordon Freegard — For an act of gallantry not in the presence of the enemy
- Captain Harry Frew — For services with the British East African Force
- Major Robert Henry Frost — Base Supply Depot, Newhaven
- Captain Sydney George Frost — For services with the British Expeditionary Force in France
- Leo Alfred Fullagar — Designer of HM Potash Factory
- Captain James Glen Fullerton — Master of a Transport
- Alfred Fyson — First Assistant Superintendent at a Remount Depot
- Helen Gadd — Commandant, Yacht Club Auxiliary Hospital and Convalescent Home, Gravesend
- Captain John Russell Gales — Assistant Secretary, Navy and Army Canteen Board
- Mary Louisa Wheler-Galton — Commandant, Guy's Cliffe Auxiliary Hospital, Warwick
- Major Charles William Gamble — Staff Officer, 2nd Class, Royal Air Force
- Winifred Game — Commandant, Ewen Hall and Ken Cottage Hospitals, High Barnet
- Edmond Thomas Gann — Civil Assistant to Director-General, Army Medical Service
- Tom Gardner — Director — The West Riding Chemical Co., Ltd.
- Herbert Garland — Munitions Inventions Department
- Edith Garlick — Assistant to Manager, The Birmingham Metal and Munitions Co., Ltd.
- Richard Garlick — Indoor Technical Manager, Northumberland Shipbuilding Company
- Arthur Garner — Staff Officer, Stores Department, General Post Office
- Charles Scott Garrett Superintendent at one of HM Factories, Ministry of Munitions
- Alice Florence, Baroness Garvagh — Organiser of Working Parties for Prisoners of War
- George Geddes JP Member of the Appeal Tribunal for the Sheriffdom of Elgin
- Jane Gemmill — Chairman of the Partick War Savings Association
- Ethel Constance Geoghegan — Private Secretary to Council Member "D," Ministry of Munitions
- The Hon. Mildred Dorothea Gibbs — Administrator, Hospital for Invalid Belgians; in charge of General Service Department, County of London Branch Office, British Red Cross Society
- Grace Gibson — Honorary Stores Manager — Headquarters Clothing Depot, Scottish Branch, British Red Cross Society
- Lieutenant-Colonel Orland Kingsley Gibson — Deputy Director of Dental Services, Canadian Forces
- Captain William Walker Gibson — Special employment at a Port Depot, Royal Air Force
- Chief Gunner Frank Gilby RN
- Robert Edgar Giles — Secretary, Admiralty Committee, War Trade Board
- Joseph Withers Gill — Section Director, Priority Department, Ministry of Munitions
- James Gillespie — Works Manager, Messrs. David Colville & Sons, Limited
- Thomas Gillett — Managing Director, Messrs. Gillett, Stephen and Co., Ltd.
- Dorothy Gladys Gillon — Member of the British War Mission to the United States of America
- James Gilmour — Superintendent, Manchester City Police
- William John Gilpin LRCP MRCS Commandant, Bourne Auxiliary Hospital, South Lincolnshire
- Margaret Gimson — Leicester Local War Pensions Committee
- Second Lieutenant Athelstan Louis Gladwell — For services with the British East African Force
- Monica Glazebrook — Voluntary Aid Detachment Secretary, Headquarters, British Red Cross Commission, France
- James Morrison Glen — Honorary Secretary, St. Helen's War Savings Committee
- Captain William Purvis Glendenning — Master, Mercantile Marine
- Frederick Harrison Glew — Radium Expert to the Optical and Glassware Department, Ministry of Munitions
- Lieutenant Ernest Goddard — Eastern Command, Home Forces. Cornelius Godsell, Foreman in the Carriage Works, London and South Western Railway
- Maud Mary Gold — Commandant, Braintree Union Board Room Hospital, Essex
- Isobel Frances-Goldingham — Superintendent, Women's Police Service
- Amy Sophia Goodall — Organiser and Commandant, Artists Rifles Hospital
- John Thomas Goodwin — The Sheepbridge Iron Company, Sheepbridge
- Minnie Goodwin — Head of Red Cross Comforts Section, Manchester
- Mabel Goodyear — Commandant, Lightwood Auxiliary Hospital, Smethwick.
- Isidore Heyam Gordon — Chief Transport Officer, Paris, British Red Cross Commission, France
- Lisa Mary Gordon — Area Controller, Scottish Command, Queen Mary's Army Auxiliary Corps
- Captain James Thomas Gorman — In charge of Clerical Establishment, War-Priorities Committee
- Emmeline Mary Vallance Gorringe — Canteen Manager at a National Projectile Factory
- William Gouk — Engine Works Manager, Messrs. Harland and Wolff
- Harold Miller Gould — District Secretary of an Army Area, in France, YMCA
- Ernest Graddon — Temporary Officer, Employment Department, Ministry of Labour
- Captain Ernest Grandin — Master of a Transport
- Jane Marian Grantham — Commandant, Skegness Auxiliary Hospital, North Lincolnshire:
- Frances Marjorie Graves — Clerk, Foreign Office Library
- Herbert Stanley Gray — Secretary, Cotton Exports Committee, War Trade Department
- Percy Gray — Assistant to assistant director, Shipyard Labour Department, Admiralty
- Robert Gray — Works Manager, Messrs. Dorman, Long and Co., Ltd.
- Captain Valentine Edgar Gray — South African Hospital and Comforts Fund
- William Acheson-Gray — Secretary and Treasurer, Kingston, Surbiton, and District Red Cross Hospital
- Richard Henry Greaves — Research Department, Woolwich
- Alice Green — Voluntary Worker, Ministry of Labour
- Arthur Stanley Green Commandant and Medical Officer, Boutham Auxiliary Hospital, North Lincolnshire
- Helen Mowbray Vincent-Green — Honorary Organizer, Wimbledon War Workers' Association
- William Isaac Green — Secretary and Accountant to the British Red Cross Commissioner, Italy, Fred Greenall"
- Deputy Assistant Inspector of Aeroplanes, Aeronautical Inspection, Ministry of Munitions
- Charles Edward Greener — Managing Director, Messrs. W. W. Greener; chairman, Gun Makers' Section, Chamber of Commerce, Birmingham
- William Greenwood — Brigadier, Salvation Army.
- Basil Francis Gregory — Assistant Finance Officer, Food Production Department
- Frances Violet Gregory — Deputy Assistant Censor, Postal Censorship.
- John Gregory — Managing Director, Messrs. Sneyd Bycars, Limited
- Mary Lizette Grey — Organiser and Commandant, 13th Northumberland V.A. Hospital
- 2nd Lieutenant Geoffrey Grice — For an act of gallantry not in the presence of the enemy
- James Henry Griffin — Deputy Chief Constable of Hampshire
- Lieutenant George Devonald Griffith — Quarter Master to an Officers' School of Instruction
- Louisa Griffith — Matron, Hackney Infirmary
- George Edward Griffiths — For services to Senior Naval Officer, West Coast of Africa
- J. R. Grimsey JP Chairman, Blything Local Tribunal
- Frederick Grose — Honorary Inspector, Department of Surveyor-General of-Supply, War Office
- Thomas Collier Grounds — Partner, Messrs. Hogg & Robinson, Admiralty Shipping Agents
- Julian Charles Grumbar — Member of the executive committee, War Refugees Committee
- James Bennett Guild — Head of Statistical Branch Section, Ministry of Food
- Hannah Guilford — Member of the Nottingham Education Committee; Organiser of Public Kitchens at Elementary School Cookery Centres
- Alexander Gunn — Sub-Section Director, Labour Department, Ministry of Munitions
- George Gunton — Station Master, Riverside Station, Mersey Docks and Harbour Board, Liverpool
- James Gurling — Deputy Assistant Inspector of Engines, Aeronautical Inspection, Ministry of Munitions
- Mabel Annie Gurney — Private Secretary to Assistant Secretary, Ministry of Food
- William Jennens Hackett — Honorary Secretary, Newcastle upon Tyne-War Savings Committee
- Thomas Edward Sherwood Hale — Honorary Secretary and Accountant of a YMCA, Munition Workers' Canteen
- Captain Willie Hales — Assistant Inspector of Empty Shell, Ministry of Munitions
- Anthony Hall — Late Secretary, Agricultural Machinery Department, Ministry of Munitions
- Alice Mary Hall — Matron, Dreadnought Seamen's Hospital, Greenwich
- Captain Eric Watson Hall — For an act of gallantry not in the presence of the enemy
- Second Lieutenant George Frederick Hall — For an act of gallantry not in the presence of the enemy
- Henry Hall — Clerk, Local Government Board
- Captain John Job Hall — Master, Mercantile Marine
- Major Robert Hall — Aircraft Park Commander, Royal Air Force
- Thomas Hall — 3rd Class Manager, Lancaster Employment Exchange, Ministry of Labour
- Edyth Mary Halse — Superintendent at a Munition Workers'" Canteen
- Jane Ethel Hamilton — Woman Welfare Officer, Scotland, Ministry of Munitions
- Lieutenant Thomas Hamilton — For an act of gallantry not in the presence-of the enemy
- Frederick Hancock — Secretary, Rouen Recreation Committee
- Albert Edward Hankins — Clerk, War Office
- Sarah Ann Pike Hannaford — Matron, Poplar and Stepney Sick-Asylum
- Ellen Frances Harburn — Training Inspector, Women's Police Service
- John Hardie — Assistant Superintending Engineer, General Post Office
- Colonel John Stafford Goldie Harding — Recruiting Officer
- Captain Henry Harrison Hardy — General Staff Officer, Third Grade, War-Office
- Rowland George Barman — Commission Internationale de Ravitaillement
- William Blandford Harris — 1st Class Supplementary Clerk, Secretary's Office, General Post Office
- Captain William John Harrison — Assistant, Research Department, Woolwich
- John Blake Harrold — Staff Clerk, Board of Trade.
- Second Lieutenant Herbert Edward Harry— National Service Representative, Lewisham
- Ernest Sidney Walter Hart — Clerk to Middlesex Appeal Tribunal
- Jane Elizabeth Hart — Sheffield Local War Pensions Committee
- Lilian Mary Hartland — Quarter Master, Totnes Auxiliary Hospital
- Captain Alfred Harwood — Statistical Branch, Department of Director-General, Army Medical Service
- Gertrude Harwood — Lady Superintendent, Inspection of Equipment and Stores Division, Woolwich Dockyard
- Charles Joseph Hassell — Collector of Customs and Excise, London Port
- Alice Hasthorpe — Secretary's Department, Admiralty
- Frank Hawker — Managing Director, Carpathian Silver Co., Ltd.
- Frank Feodor Wynne Hawker
- Harry George Hawker — Trade Pilot, Sopwith Aviation Co., Ltd.
- John Alfred Hawkins — Superintendent of Waterguard, London Port.
- Millar Wright Hawson — Supervisor and Outdoor Manager, Messrs. Rea, Coaling Agents
- Althea Maud Hay — Higher Grade Woman Clerk, Ministry of Shipping
- Agnes Hayes — Superintendent of Typists, Labour Department, Ministry of Munitions
- Ernest Edwin Haylock — Clerk, War Office
- Captain George William Haynes — Assistant Inspector of Guns, Leeds Area, Ministry of Munitions
- Thomas William James Hayse — Detective Superintendent, Swansea Borough Police
- George Hazlehurst — Dock Traffic and Railway Superintendent, Manchester Ship Canal Company
- Iris Evelina Margaret Campbell Heap — Confidential Shorthand Writer to Director of Mobilization, War Office
- Stephen Heap — Navy and Army Canteen Board
- Major Thomas Arthur Heath — Superintending Clerk, Directorate of Remounts, War Office
- Arthur Edward Hebron DCM Inspector for Shipment of Engineering Stores, War Office
- Wilfred Fulleylove Helcke — Manager at one of the establishments of Messrs. Kynoch, Limited
- Freda Marguerite Dorothy Henderson — Administrative Assistant, Contracts Department, Ministry of Munitions
- John Henderson — Deputy Chief Constable, North Riding Police
- Mabel Henderson — YMCA
- Alexander James Hendin — Chief Draughtsman, Shipbuilding Department, Fairfield Shipbuilding and Engineering Company
- William Carruthers Hetherington — Clerk, War Office
- Eileen Mabel Hewitt Medical Officer in Charge, Women's Hospital, Royal Arsenal, Woolwich
- Captain Thomas Hewitt — Master, Mercantile Marine
- Chief Artificer-Engineer Nicholas John Hicks RN
- Thomas William Hicks Staff Medical Officer to County Director, and Officer in Charge of Red Cross Convoys, Middlesex, British Red Cross and Order of St. John of Jerusalem; Commandant, East Finchley Auxiliary Hospital
- Lieutenant John Higgins RN Coaling Officer, HM Dockyard, Sheerness
- Catherine Octavia Higgon — Commandant and Officer-in-Charge, Cottesmore Red Cross Hospital, Pembrokeshire
- Captain Ledger Story Hill — Assistant Provost Marshal, Egyptian. Expeditionary Force
- Robert James Hilliar — In charge of Red Cross Ambulance and Transport Work, Worcestershire
- Gladys Elizabeth Clark Hilliard — Lady Superintendent, Inspection Department, Glasgow and West of Scotland Area, Ministry of Munitions
- Alice Marion, Baroness Hillingdon — Vice-president, Uxbridge District, British Red Cross Society
- Captain Henry Hills — For an act of gallantry not in the presence of the enemy
- Isabel Sinton Hills — Personal Assistant to one of the Financial Advisers of the Controller of Coal Mines
- Major John Harris Hills — Staff Officer, 2nd Class, Royal Air Force
- Captain Arthur — Instructor, Forces, Hinchliffe. Signalling Service, Home
- Robert Hinchliffe — Chief Draughtsman, Messrs. Armstrong, Whitworth and Co
- Ernest Edward nines — Company Commander, Norwich Special Constabulary,
- Thomas Cullen Hird — Railway Traffic Superintendent, Mersey Docks and Harbour Board, Liverpool
- Second Lieutenant Lawrence Hiron Hitchcock — For an act of gallantry not in the presence of the enemy
- John William Hobday — YMCA
- The Rev. Charles William Hodder — Welfare Supervisor, Messrs. W. Denny and Brothers, Limited
- Lieutenant Richard Henry Hodge RN
- William Anthony Hogarth — Works Manager, The Steel Company of Scotland, Limited
- Mary Clare Hollins — Lady Superintendent, Rouen, YMCA
- Major Reginald Holloway — Staff Officer, 2nd Class, Royal Air Force
- Joseph Edward Leo Holmes, County Inspector, Royal Irish Constabulary
- Herbert George Hope — Assistant Inspector of Small Arms, Woolwich Arsenal
- John Hope — Assistant Deputy Chief Constable, in Charge of Special Constables, Cumberland
- Francis George Hopgood — Steward, Belgian Refugees Camp, Earl's Court
- Muriel Margaret Hopkins — Head of Filing Department, Convalescent Homes for Officers Department, British Red Cross Society and Order of St. John of Jerusalem
- Captain Thomas Hollis Hopkins — For services with the British Expeditionary Force in France
- Captain Allen Haigh Hopkinson — Recruiting Officer
- Percy Clarence Hopper — Station Master, Victoria Station, South Eastern and Chatham Railway
- Major Frederick Middleton Hornsby— National Service Representative, West Ham
- Gustav Otto Henry Horstmann — Managing Director, The Horstmann Gear Co., Ltd.
- Thomas Houston — Assistant Shipyard Manager, Messrs. Harland and Wolff
- Annie Howard — Chief Superintendent of Typists, Ministry of Shipping
- Catharine Meriel, Lady Howard — YMCA. Worker in South Wales
- William Trotman Howes, Executive Officer, Wiltshire War Agricultural Executive Committee
- Christina Lamond Howie — Lady Superintendent, Post Office Canteen, Regent's Park
- Frank Hewlett — Central Organiser for Stores and Supplies, Church Army
- George Wall Wall Bagot Hughes — Secretary in Charge, New Zealand YMCA in England
- Marjorie Hughes — Higher Grade Woman Clerk, Ministry of Shipping
- Herbert Hugill — Honorary- Secretary, Keighley War Savings Committee
- William Hume — Manager of Boiler Department, Wallsend Slipway and Engineering Co., Ltd.
- Thomas Clements Humphrey, Station Master, York Station, North Eastern Railway
- Albert Humphries — Assistant Superintendent, Royal Laboratory, Woolwich
- Chief Gunner George Hunt RN
- Edith Lena Hunter — Secretary, YMCA with the Mesopotamian Expeditionary Force
- George Albert Hunter — Leading Draughtsman, Messrs. Swan Hunter and Wigham Richardson.
- Edgar Barton Hunton — Inspector of Taxes, Board of Inland Revenue
- Arthur Edmund Hutchins — Stores Department, Joint War Committee, British Red Cross Society and Order of St. John of Jerusalem
- Stamford Hutton JP Gloucester Local War Pensions Committee
- Ernest Henry Huxford — Naval Store Department, HM Dockyard, Portsmouth
- Muriel Kathleen Huxter — Lady Clerk, War Office
- Lieutenant Henry Maxwell Burton Inglis — Instructional Duties, Canadian Forces
- Captain William Clarence Inglis — Headquarters Staff, Canadian Forces
- Arnold Inman — Divisional Commander, Metropolitan Special Constabulary
- Captain James Oliver Innes MC For an act of gallantry not in the presence of the enemy
- Second Lieutenant Gerald Howard Irby — For an act of gallantry not in the presence of the enemy
- Captain Lionel Herbert Irvine — Area Registration Officer for Middlesex, and Assistant to the Deputy-Director of Recruiting, East Anglian Region, Ministry of National Service
- Isabella Bell-Irving
- Margaret Lillian Cowper Jackson — Administrative Assistant, Supplies (Aeroplanes), Aircraft Production Department, Ministry of Munitions
- Roland Jackson — Commandant, Red Cross Transport, Birkenhead
- Violette Mary Jackson — YMCA Worker in France; now in Charge of YMCA Enquiry Bureau, Trafalgar Square
- Diana Lily James — Commandant, 14th Northumberland V.A. Hospital
- Henry Maunsell James — Clerk, War Office
- Iris Silburn James — Head of Registry, Meat Division, Ministry of Food
- Ivor Lough James — Works Manager, Messrs. W. H. Dorman and Co., Ltd.
- Josephine Selina James — Honorary Organizer of the Streatham War Hospital Supply Depot
- Mary Margaret Jazdouska — In Charge of the British Soldiers' Club, Rome
- Edward Compton Jefferys — Secretary to Controller, Trench Warfare Supply Department, Ministry of Munitions
- Captain Rees Jenkins — Staff Captain, General Headquarters, Home Forces
- Stanley Noel Jenkinson — Manager, The Edinburgh and Leith Flint Glass Manufacturing Co., Ltd.
- Captain Walter Joanes — Instructional Duties, Signal Service, Home Forces
- Thomas Jobling, Foreman Blacksmith, Messrs. Swan Hunter and Wigham Richardson
- Captain Cuthbert Johnson — Sub-Section Director, Optical and Glassware Department, Ministry of Munitions
- Walter Johnson — Chief Engineer, Messrs. Abram Lyle & Sons, Ltd., Sugar Refiners
- Walter Johnson — Acting Senior Clerk, Exchequer and Audit Department
- Winifred Blanche Johnston — Naval Store Department, Admiralty
- Lieutenant-Colonel Thomas Riley Jolly VD JP Ministry of National Service
- Alfred Richard Jones — London Representative of Messrs. Guest, Keen, and Nettlefolds, Limited
- Lieutenant Brainard Arthur Robinson Jones — For an act of gallantry not in the presence of the enemy
- David Marteine Jones — Clerk, War Office
- Dorothea Adelaide Lowry Pughe Jones — Voluntary Aid Detachment in Charge, Hostel for Relatives of Wounded, Hôtel des Anglais, Le Touquet, France
- Edgar Heath-Jones — Accountant, Central Prisoners of War Committee, British Red Cross Society
- Frederick Tobias Jones — Works Manager, Ministry of Munitions Instructional Factory, Birmingham
- Lieutenant Kenneth Charles Johnston Jones MC For an act of gallantry not in the presence of the enemy
- Lillie Highfield-Jones — Lieutenant-Quarter Master, Women's Volunteer Reserve
- John Clague Joughin — Acting Constructor, Department of Director of Warship Production, Admiralty
- Margaret Beatrice Ethel Joynson. Cashier, Ministry of National Service
- Captain Ambrose Keevil — For an act of gallantry not in the presence of the enemy
- Mary Keightley — Head of department, Bread Bureau for Prisoners of War, British Red Cross Society, Switzerland
- William Keir — In Charge of Cured Fish Sub-section of Fish Branch, Ministry of Food
- Eleanor Sarah Kelly RRC Late Secretary to Matron-in-Chief, Queen Alexandra's Military Nursing Service
- Henry Titus Kelly — Chief Engineer, Mercantile Marine
- Henry Kemble — Honorary Secretary for Essex North, Incorporated Soldiers' and Sailors' Help Society; Local General Manager of the Eastern Counties Branch Workshops
- Major Joseph Kemper — For services with the British Expeditionary Force in France
- Charlotte Emma Mabel Kendall — Quarter Master. Ellesmere Auxiliary Hospital, Shropshire
- Sylvia Kenrick — Quarter Master, Voluntary Aid Detachment Rest Station, Birmingham
- Arthur Thomas Kent — Engineer, Woodall-Duckham Vertical Retort and Oven Construction Co., Ltd.
- Thomas Kenyon — Assistant Manager, Gun Mounting Department, Messrs. Armstrong, Whitworth & Co.
- Thomas Allan Kenyon — Chief Clerk to the General Manager, Lancashire and Yorkshire Railway
- Leighton Buchanan Ker — Technical Inspector (Honorary), Department of Surveyor-General of Supply, War Office
- John Charles Kew JP Organiser of Belgian Relief Work, Newark
- Thomas Kimber — Ministry of National Service
- James Charles Clegg Kimmins JP Chairman, Stroud Rural Local Tribunal
- Katherine Emma Kindersley — Organiser of Young Women's Christian Association. Munition Girls' Clubs
- The Rev. Thomas King — Personal Assistant to Assistant Controller, Central Stores Department, Ministry of Munitions
- William Samuel King — Civil Veterinary Surgeon, Army Veterinary Service
- Robert Dixon Kingham — Executive Officer, National War Savings Committee
- John Edward Kingsland — Medical Department, Ministry of National Service
- Charles Kinloch — Control Master, Coatbridge, North British Railway
- Harry Jeoffrey Kinsman — District Superintendent, Central Stores Department, Ministry of Munitions
- George Clarvis Kirby — Manager, Wood-working Department, Messrs. Ruston Proctor and Co., Ltd.
- Marion Ellen Kirby — Honorary Secretary, Hospital Bag Fund
- Captain Robert Kirkpatrick — Canadian Army Medical Corps
- Florence Sydney Brudenell Kirwan — Secretary, YMCA, with the Mesopotamian Expeditionary Force
- Fanny Rushall Kitching — Controller of Typists, India Office
- Christina Graham Knight — Matron of Albert Dock Hospital
- Captain Henry Newton Knights JP Chairman of a Local Advisory Committee
- Reginald Edward Knocker VD Town Clerk, Dover
- Alice, Lady Knox — Honorary Secretary, Basingstoke Division, British Red Cross and Order of St. John of Jerusalem
- George Ernest Korn — Manager, Nitrate of Soda Department, Messrs. Antony Gibbs & Sons
- Major Charles Frederick Krabbe — Staff Officer, 2nd Class, Royal Air Force
- Minnie Kynoch — Member of the Dundee Food Control and Food Economy Committees
- Blanche Sarah Lambert — Organiser, Young Women's Christian Association. Canteens for Army Pay Girls and Women Clerks
- O. Lance — Acting Expense Accounts Officer, Malta
- Lottie, Lady Arbuthnot Lane — Superintendent, Bandage Room, Central Work Rooms, British Red Cross Society
- Stuart Jackson Lang — In Charge, Advance Red Cross Stores Depot, Southern Area, France
- Percy James Langley — Clerk in Charge of Accounts (Acting), Board of Agriculture and Fisheries
- Herbert Langridge — Head of the Textile, Leather and Equipment Department, Commission Internationale de Ravitaillement
- William Latey — In Charge of Gun Requirements, Requirements and Statistics Department, Ministry of Munitions
- Angel Lawrence Lawrence — Assistant Secretary, Central Medical War Committee
- Elizabeth Mary Hilda Lawrence — Part Founder and Superintendent of the Wigan Work Room, British Red Cross Society
- Catherine Adah Kerr-Lawson — Superintendent, Queen Mary's Hostel for Nurses
- Lieutenant Harold Lawson — Officer Clerk, Royal Air Force
- Mildred Zacyntha Lawson — Leeds Local War Pensions Committee
- James Alfred Lawther — Minor Staff Clerk, National Health Insurance Commission (England)
- William Leach — Manager at a National Shell Factory
- Loraine Lee — Administrative Assistant, Contracts' Department, Ministry of Munitions
- Gladys Mary Leeson — Chemist at a National Filling Factory
- Elsie Maude Leinster — Quarter Master, 1st Durham Auxiliary Hospital and St. John Ambulance Brigade Hospital, Saltwell Towers, Durham
- Major Thomas Geoffrey Leith — Aircraft Production Directorate and Royal Air Force
- Captain John Douglas Leonard — For services with the British East African Force
- George Geoffrey Lerry — Secretary, North Wales Joint Disablement Committee, Wrexham
- Major Harold Octavius Lethbridge. Registrar, No. 2 Australian Auxiliary Hospital
- William Letty — Principal Engineering Overseer, Eugineer-in-Chief's Department, Admiralty
- John Lewis JP Chairman, Carmarthen (Urban) Local Tribunal
- William Reed-Lewis — Voluntary Worker, Sussex County and Bexhill-on-Sea Belgian Refugee Committee
- Wyndham Lewis — Clerk to Pontardawe Local Tribunal
- Dorothy Mary Liddell — Commandant, Sherfield Manor Auxiliary Hospital, Basingstoke
- Thomas Liddle JP Second Class Manager, Sunderland Employment Exchange, Ministry of Labour
- Mary Josephine Imelda, Countess of Limerick — Lady Superintendent, Free Buffet, London Bridge Station
- Walter Lindley JP Chairman, Emergency Special Constables, and Group Leader, Leicestershire Special Constabulary
- Captain Alexander Dunlop Lindsay — For services with the British Expeditionary Force in France
- Second Lieutenant Harold Robert Lindsay — For an act of gallantry not in the presence of the enemy
- Lieutenant Herbert Westwood Ling — For an act of gallantry not in the presence of the enemy
- Samuel Niman Lipman — Honorary Worker, YMCA. Munitions Department
- Lieutenant William Lister — For an act of gallantry not in the presence of the enemy
- Chief Gunner Harry Duncaff Lloyd RN
- Lieutenant Herbert Allan Lloyd — For services with the British Expeditionary Force in France
- Captain William Stephen Lobb — Master, Mercantile Marine
- Emily Elizabeth Loch — Lady Superintendent, YMCA, Windsor Great Park
- Staff Paymaster Herbert Anthony Lockett RNVR For services with the British Expeditionary Force in France
- Florence Loftin — In Charge, Red Cross Home, Cairo Station
- William Malcolm Logan — Egyptian State Railways
- Mabel Sarah Lomax — Commandant and Officer-in-Charge, Linden Lea Auxiliary Hospital, Brooklands, Cheshire
- Katherine Ellis Long — Commandant, Swavesey Auxiliary Hospital, Cambridgeshire
- Captain William Long — Manager. Steamship Department, Messrs. Elder and Fyffe
- Percy Longmuir — Works Manager, Messrs. Samuel Fox and Co., Ltd.
- Charles Ernest Lord — Clerk in Messrs. Rothschild's Bank, Paris
- Thomas Lovelady — Chief Controller, London and North Western Railway
- Captain William Herbert Lowe — Staff Captain, War Office
- Terence Lucas — Superintendent of the Photographic Department, Ordnance Survey
- Colonel Thomas Woodwright Lucas — Assistant to Officer Commanding Glamorgan and Monmouth Recruiting Area
- Herbert William Luker — Assistant Director — Chief Engineer's Department, and assistant director, Vegetable Preservation Branch, Ministry of Food
- Thomas William Lumsden, Yard Master, Gateshead, North Eastern Railway
- Edmund Lund — Honorary Secretary, Ossett War Savings Committee
- Janet Lund — Organiser of Beaulieu Auxiliary Hospital, Harrogate
- Lieutenant Hubert Lush — For an act of gallantry not in the presence of the enemy
- Shipwright Lieutenant George William Luxon RN
- Mellicent Lyall — Deputy Assistant Inspector of Fuzes, Ministry of Munitions
- The Hon. Rosalind Margaret Lyell. Wounded and Missing Enquiry Department, British Red Cross Society
- Alexander Mclntosh Lyle — Works Manager, Messrs. Abram Lyle & Sons, Ltd., Sugar Refiners
- Major Patrick Lynch — Senior Clerk, Statistical Department, Board of Customs and Excise
- Audrey Lynne — Honorary Secretary, Teignmouth Belgian Refugees Committee
- Richard Charles Lyon JP Member of the Local Tribunal of the City of Dundee
- Captain John McAlister — Master of a Transport
- Sibyl La Fontaine McAnally — Private Secretary to Director-General of Food Production
- Ignatius James John McCarthy — Clerk, War Office
- Andrew McClelland — Chief Shipyard Draughtsman, Messrs. Swan Hunter and Wigham Richardson
- Mary, Lady McClure — Vice-president, Mill Hill District, British Red Cross Society
- Dudley Evelyn Bruce McCorkell JP County Director, City of Londonderry and County of Donegal, Irish Branch, British Red Cross Society
- Major James McCrae. Commander of an Aircraft Acceptance Park, Royal Air Force
- Captain Charles James Lewis McDonald — For services with the British Expeditionary Force in France
- Godfrey Middleton Bosville MacDonald of the Isles, Stores Transport Officer, Boulogne, British Red Cross Commission, France
- Walter James McDonnell — Staff Clerk, General Register Office
- Alice Mary, Lady Patten-MacDougall — President, Argyllshire, Scottish Branch, British Red Cross Society
- James Arthur Henderson Macfarlane — Clerk, Local Government Board
- Emily McFerran — Organiser, Hospital War Depot, County Armagh, Irish Branch, British Red Cross Society
- Captain John McGevoc — For services with the British Expeditionary Force in France
- Thomas Brown McGilchrist — Chief Engineer, Mercantile Marine
- Joseph MacGregor — Manager, Bull Ring Department, Smith's Dock, South Shields
- Robert William MacGregor — Superintendent at one of HM Factories, Ministry of Munitions
- Ethel Theresa McGuinness — In Charge of Typing Staff, Cable Censorship, War Office
- Mary Jane McGuiness — Superintendent of Women Clerks, Surveyor-General of Supplies Department, War Office
- James Graham Mcilvenna — Assistant Outside Manager, Messrs. Swan Hunter and Wigham Richardson
- Duncan Mackinnon Macintyre — Secretary, Glasgow Committee for the Coordination of Naval, Military and Civil Requirements
- Second Lieutenant Robert William Mclntyre — For an act of gallantry not in the presence of the enemy
- William Mclntyre — Assistant Traffic Manager, Highland Railway
- Donald Mackenzie — Chief Engineer, Mercantile Marine
- John McKenzie JP Ex-Provost of the Burgh of Stornoway; Chairman of the Local Tribunal
- Marion McKersie
- Thomas Callender Campbell Mackie — Secretary, Scottish "Penny-a-Week" Fund, County of Dumbarton, Scottish Branch, British Red Cross Society
- Edward Laurence Mackillop — Section Director, Accounts Department, Ministry of Munitions
- Alister Mackinnon — Senior Assistant Inspector of Munitions, Cincinnati District, Ministry of Munitions
- James MacLachlan CM Honorary Secretary, Sutherland Branch, Scottish Branch, British Red Cross Society
- Douglas Philip Maclagan, Motor Transport Officer, City of Edinburgh, Scottish Branch, British Red Cross Society
- John McLaren — Secretary, Edinburgh Branch, Incorporated Soldiers and Sailors Help Society
- Captain Charles Allan MacLean — For an act of gallantry not in the presence of the enemy
- John Hair Kirk McLean — Manager, Repair Yard, Messrs. Radhead, South Shields
- Margaret Eleanor Maclure — Organiser, Dover House Hospital Supply Work Rooms, Manchester
- Lieutenant Albert James McMahon. Instructional Duties, Signal Service, Home Forces
- Hugh McMaster JP Leading Plater, Messrs. Russell & Co., Port Glasgow
- Margaret Grahame Bryce MacNab — Commandant, Brechin Voluntary Aid Detachment
- Captain Dougal Campbell McPherson — For services with the British Expeditionary Force in France
- Thomas McPherson — Chief Draughtsman, Messrs. Wallsend Slip and Engineering Company
- William McQuillen — Headmaster of Whitley and Monkseaton, Whitley South, Council School, Northumberland
- Alexander McRae — Chief Shipyard Draughtsman, Messrs. Swan Hunter and Wigham Richardson
- Herbert Alexander Macrae — Japan Consular Service
- Margaret McReddie — Honorary Secretary, Dartford Local War Pensions Committee
- David McRobbie — District Traffic Superintendent, North British Railway
- Lieutenant Herbert James Mactavish — For an act of gallantry not in the presence of the enemy
- Neil McVicar — Assistant Manager, Messrs. Barclay Curie & Co.
- Dorothy McWilliam — Chief Lady Welfare Supervisor at one of HM Factories, Ministry of Munitions
- William Robert Magnus — Chief of the Train Control Section, Great Eastern Railway
- Captain Richard Kenneth Calton Maguire — For services with the British Expeditionary Force in France
- John Charles Malim — Acting Civil Engineer, Killingholme
- Major Harry Ainsley Mann MC Deputy Director of Army Postal Services, Egyptian Expeditionary Force
- Lieutenant James Henderson Mann — For an act of gallantry not in the presence of the enemy
- Lieutenant James Benjamin Manners RN
- Captain Lionel John Manning — Master, Mercantile Marine
- Arthur Mansell — Station Master, Aldershot, London and South Western Railway
- Gertrude Thompson Manwell — Signal Division, Admiralty
- Euretta Mary Maples — Honorary Secretary, Spalding District, British Red Cross Society
- Anna Elizabeth Daisy Markham — Organising Secretary, Queen Mary's Needlework Guild, York
- David Gregory Marshall — Canteen Manager, Royal Arsenal, Woolwich
- Ethel Margaret Marshall — Confidential Clerk to the deputy director of Recruiting, North Western Region, Ministry of National Service
- Lieutenant James Wright Martin — For an act of gallantry not in the presence of the enemy
- Edith Martineau — Organiser, Esher Auxiliary Hospital, Surrey
- Alfred Martinelli — Staff Clerk, War Office
- James Irvine Orme Masson — Research Chemist, Research Department;, Woolwich
- Wilfrid John Masters — Personal Assistant to Director of Inspection of Munitions Areas, Sheffield, Ministry of Munitions
- John Masterton — HM Senior Inspector of Mines
- Lieutenant Sydney Harold Matcham — Assistant Military Secretary, Branch Headquarters, Canadian Forces
- John Jephson Mathers — Superintendent, Machine and Erecting Shops, Midland Railway
- Percy Ewing Matheson — Administrative Assistant, Labour Department, Ministry of Munitions
- Captain Basil Garland-Matthews — Deputy Assistant Quarter-Master-General, Headquarters, Australian Imperial Force
- Thomas Herbert Mattinson — Assistant Director, Fruit Supplies and Preservation Branch, Ministry of Food
- Jean Adolphe Mauger — Chief Clerk, Defence of the Realm Losses Commission
- Sidney Joseph Mawle — Assistant County Director, Oxfordshire Branch, British Red Cross Society
- Marjorie Maxse — Foreign Trade Department
- Frances Jane Heron-Maxwell — Vice-chairman, West Kent Women's War Agricultural Committee
- Stephen John Maxwell — Head of Special Distribution Branch, Sugar Commission
- Lieutenant-Commander William Henry May RN
- Thomas Langley Maycock — Managing Director of Messrs. Herbert Watson & Co., Shipowners.
- Walter Alfred Meaby— Superintending Clerk, War Office
- Jesse Simpson Medd — Chief Wharfinger, London and South Western Railway Docks, Southampton
- Barry Meglaughlin — Red Cross Services, Dungannon, County Tyrone, Irish Branch, British Red Cross Society
- Captain Thomas Cyril Mellonie — For services with the British Expeditionary Force in France
- John Mellor — Chief Clerk, Territorial Force Association of the County of Chester
- John Mitchell Melville — Clerk, War Office
- John Lewis Merchant — Secretary, Bury Munitions Board of Management
- 2nd Lieutenant Henry Edward Merry — For services with the British Expeditionary Force in France
- Captain Harold William Metcalfe — Assistant Superintendent of Works and Grounds, Chemical Warfare Department, Ministry of Munitions
- Frances Mary Gore Micklethwait — Experimental Chemical Supply Officer, Trench Warfare Supply Department, Ministry of Munitions
- Lieutenant Percy Middlemas — Gunnery Officer, Royal, Air Force (Machine Guns)
- George Francis Middleton — Chief of Staff, Horticultural Division, Food Production Department
- William Milburn — Assistant Controller of Registration, Ministry of National Service, Middlesbrough
- Captain William Mildren — Assistant Secretary, Territorial Force Association of the West Riding of Yorkshire
- Major Arnold John Miley — Aircraft Production Directorate and Royal Air Force
- Major Exley Livingston Millar — Controller of an Aeroplane Repair Section in the Field
- Minnie Milledge — Principal Clerk, Female Staff, National Health Insurance Commission (England)
- Alexander Miller — Chief Engineer, Mercantile Marine
- Edith Mary Miller — Commandant, The Chalet Auxiliary Hospital, Hoylake, Cheshire
- Charles Augustus Mills — Late of Indian Irrigation Service
- Florence Leyland Mills — Honorary Secretary, Liverpool Centre, and Commandant, West Lancashire Reserve, St. John Ambulance Association
- Margaret Smith Milne — Matron, 29 General Hospital, Salonika Expeditionary Force
- Captain Francis Colin Minett — Bacteriologist, Army Veterinary Corps
- 2nd Lieutenant Henry William Mirehouse — For an act of gallantry not in the presence of the enemy
- James Knight Mitchell — Agent, Waterloo Station, Aberdeen, Great North of Scotland Railway
- 2nd Lieutenant William Boyd Mitchell — For an act of gallantry not in the presence of the enemy
- Alexander Penrose David Moir — Honorary Auditor of War Savings Associations in Scotland
- Captain Thomas Moir — Master, Mercantile Marine
- Thomas Molyneaux — Resident Engineer and Manager at a National Shell Factory
- Captain Geoffrey Edmund Sebag-Montefiore — Assistant Provost Marshal, Egyptian Expeditionary Force
- Annie Moore — Battersea Voluntary War Workers' Association
- Captain Cecil Arbuthnot St. George Moore — For an act of gallantry not in the presence of the enemy
- Captain Harry Formby Moore — Adjutant of a Command Depot, Australian Imperial Force
- Second Lieutenant John Moran — For an act of gallantry not in the presence of the enemy
- Major Reginald Keble Morcom, Royal Engineers For services with the British Expeditionary Force, Salonika
- Thomas Mordey — Head Foreman over Steel Workers, Messrs. W. Gray & Co., West Hartlepool
- Bessie Morgan — Assistant Censor, Postal Censorship
- Edward Barcham Morgan — Shipyard Engineer, Messrs. Swan Hunter and Wigham Richardson, Newcastle
- Margaret Alice Agnes Morgan — Coal Mines Department, Board of Trade
- Helena Frances Morle — Superintendent of Women Clerks in the Accountant-General's Department, Board of Education
- Lieutenant Percy Morrey — For an act of gallantry not in the presence of the enemy
- Arthur Morris — Assistant to General Manager, Messrs. Armstrong, Whitworth & Co.
- Charles Edward Morris — Engineer, Raw Materials Branch, Explosives Supply Department, Ministry of Munitions
- Miss. Etheldreda Morris — Welfare Superintendent at a National Filling Factory
- Florence Muriel Morris Commandant and Medical Officer-in-Charge, Paignton Auxiliary Hospital, Devonshire
- Hardwick Grant Morris — Engineer to the Cairo Water Works
- Jean Anderson Morris — Private Secretary to the Head of the Finance Section, Foreign Trade Department
- William Anthony Morris — Assistant to Administrative Officer, Inspection Department, Woolwich, Ministry of Munitions
- James Augustus Morrison— Master of the Homes and Hospital, Incorporated Soldiers and Sailors Society
- John Morrison — Secretary to the District Agricultural Committee, Kirkcudbrightshire
- John Morrison — Works Manager, Shipyard Department, Messrs. Harland & Wolff
- Captain Leopold George Esmond Morse. Messrs. Firth & Son, Limited
- Lieutenant Clifford Charles Mortimore — Department of Director of Statistics, Admiralty
- Elsie Eleanor Morton — Honorary Organising Secretary, Deptford War Hospital Supply Depot
- Lieutenant John Darnley Mitford Morton — For an act of gallantry not in the presence of the enemy
- Arthur Mousley — Manager of Messrs. Charles Winn & Co., Birmingham
- Annie Angus Mowat — Higher Grade Woman Clerk, Ministry of Shipping
- Edith Emily Mudd — Lady Superintendent, Park Royal Canteen, Ministry of Munitions
- Percy Maxwell-Muller — Works Manager at one of the establishments of Messrs. Vickers, Limited
- Lieutenant Clifford Victor Mulligan — For an act of gallantry not in the presence of the enemy
- George William Mullins — Kings Norton Metal Company, Birmingham
- Ernest Henry Murrant — Private Secretary to managing director of Messrs. Furness, Withy & Co.
- Captain Arthur Stanley Gordon Musgrave — For services with the Egyptian Expeditionary Force
- Agnes Rose Myatt — Principal of the Women's Staff, War Trade Statistical Department
- Captain Charles James Napier — For services with the British Expeditionary Force in France
- Emily Caroline Napier — Commandant, Parish Hall Auxiliary Hospital, Waterlopville, Hampshire
- 2nd Lieutenant James Ross Napier MC MM For an act of gallantry not in the presence of the enemy
- Blanche Thompson Nash — Woman's Welfare Supervisor, Ministry of Shipping
- Lieutenant Frank Horace Elliott Nash RNVR Department of the Deputy Controller for Armament Production, Admiralty
- Henry Nash — Assistant Recruiting Officer, Bristol, Ministry of National Service
- William James Naylor — Superintendent, Cheshire Constabulary
- Captain Eric Vansittart Ernest Neill — Second in Command of a Training Battalion, Australian Imperial Force
- Maria Elizabeth Nevile — Voluntary Worker for Prevention and Relief of Distress, Lincoln
- John Walker Newall — Manager, Gauge and other Departments, at a National Shell Factory
- Charles Wemyss Newton — In charge of Munition Workers Hostel and Canteen
- John Charles Newton, Atlantic Coaling Company, Sierra Leone
- George Thomas Nicholls, Accountant, Board of Inland Revenue
- Miss Dorothea Marian Nichols — Supervisor of the Central Registry, Ministry of National Service
- Florence Isabel Nicholson — Commandant, Balrath Auxiliary Hospital, Barry, Kells, County Meath
- Lieutenant-Colonel Malcolm Nicholson — Staff Officer, 2nd Class, Royal Air Force
- Reginald Nicholson — Assistant Director, Women's Branch, Food Production Department
- Samuel Thomas Nicholson — Honorary Secretary, National Chamber of Trade
- Quintin Anderson Nicol — Transport Officer, County of Durham, British Red Cross and Order of St. John of Jerusalem
- Charles Bain Niven — Chief Engineer, Mercantile Marine
- Frederick Worth Noal — Marine Superintendent, Great Eastern Railway, Parkeston Quay, Harwich
- Lieutenant William Herbert Novis — Secretary and Assistant to County Director, Shropshire, British Red Cross and Order of St. John of Jerusalem
- Alfred James Offord — Superintendent and Chief Clerk, Essex County Police
- Captain Alan Grant Ogilvie — For services with the British Expeditionary Force, Salonika
- Diana Elizabeth Maria Ogilvy — Commandant, Battenhall Auxiliary Hospital, Worcestershire
- Norman Oldfield — Secretary, Somerset War Agricultural Executive Committee
- George Edward Oldmeadow — Sub-Section Director, Labour Department, Ministry of Munitions
- Annie Gordon Olive — Commandant, "Holmdene" Auxiliary Hospital, Leamington
- John David Oliver, Foreman of Machine Shop, Messrs. Emerson, Walker and Thompson, Gateshead
- Chief Gunner Daniel John O'Meara RN
- Annie Ormerod — Lady Superintendent and Quarter Master, Castleton House Auxiliary Hospital, Castleton, East Lancashire
- Albert Alfred Osborne MRCS LRCP Commandant and Medical Officer-in-Charge, Ilfracombe Auxiliary Hospital, Devonshire
- Rosabelle Osborne — Principal Matron, British Salonika Force
- Lieutenant William Lewis Ost RN Boom Defence Officer, Queenstown
- Gerald Hendon O'Sullivan — Messrs. J.O. Sullivan & Sons
- Haidee Maria Outram — Commandant, Kirkburton Auxiliary Hospital, Huddersfield
- Lieutenant George Stanley Oxburgh — Historical Section, Committee of Imperial Defence
- Captain Thomas Benjamin Oxland — Master of a Transport
- Henry Walter Percy Packer — Priority Department, Ministry of Munitions
- Agnes Margaret Page — Higher Grade Woman Clerk, Ministry of Shipping
- Helen Painting — Confidential Shorthand Writer, War Office
- Helen Grace Palin — Matron, 21st Stationary Hospital, Salonika Expeditionary Force
- Vincent Paling — Secretary, Gun Supply Section, Ministry of Munitions
- Clara Palmer — British soldiers' Club, Rome
- Lieutenant Hubert Leslie Palmer — For an act of gallantry not in the presence of the enemy
- Captain William Falmer — Army Gymnastic Staff
- Charles Parker — Chief Clerk, Trains Office, London and North Western Railway
- Major James Edward Parkin — Royal Air Force, Recruits Training Depot
- James Parkinson — Inspector, Liverpool City Police; Inspector of Explosives in the Liverpool Dock Area
- Mary Evelyn Parry — Joint Women's Voluntary Aid Detachment Department, Devonshire House
- Lieutenant James Riddick Partington — Munitions Inventions Department
- Clara Poynton Patenall — Organiser and Commandant, Higham Ferrers Auxiliary Hospital, Northamptonshire
- Captain Neil James Kennedy-Cochran-Patrick — Appeal National Service Representative, Renfrewshire
- Captain George Payne — Army Ordnance Department
- Herbert Payne — Managing Director, Messrs. Payne & Sons (Otley) Limited
- Lily Payne — In charge of Typing Section, War Office Annexe
- Alice Evelyn Peacock — Voluntary Worker in the Calling-up Branch, Brighton Recruiting Office
- May Beauchamp Peacock — Voluntary Worker in the Calling-up Branch, Brighton Recruiting Office
- John Pearce — Ministry of National Service
- John Howard Pearson — Honorary Secretary, Dudley War Savings Committee
- Charles Waldegrave Pennell JP Deputy Chief Officer and Chief Superintendent, Lincoln City Special Constabulary
- Frederick Pennell— Master Stevedore
- Lieutenant Geoffrey Arthur Peppercorn MC Railway Materials Department Ministry of Munitions
- Ada Stair Perry — Welfare Supervisor, Messrs. Curtis and Harvey Ltd.
- Joseph Hind Pescod — Chief Draughtsman, Warship Drawing Office, Messrs. Swan Hunter and Wigham Richardson
- Fanny Elizabeth Phelps — Superintendent at a Munition Workers' Canteen
- Cecilia Lucks Phillips — Vice-president, Thetford Division, British Red Cross Society
- Captain George Lort Phillips — Commandant, Lewes Detention Barracks
- 2nd Lieutenant Richard Nelson Picken — For an act of gallantry not in the presence of the enemy
- Lieutenant Edward Fitzgerald Samuel Pickering — Adjutant of a School of Instruction for Officers
- Henrietta Sybil Douglas Picot — Assistant, Bread Bureau for Prisoners of War, British Red Cross Society, Switzerland
- Leonard Gamier Pilkington — Secretary, YMCA. Employment Bureau
- Shipwright Lieutenant John Henry Pine RN Barrack Master, Chatham
- Arthur Joseph Pitman — Acting Chief Examiner, War Office
- Nellie Flora Pitt — In charge of Typing Establishment, Park Buildings, War Office
- Major William Edward Plaister — Staff Officer, 2nd Class, Royal Air Force
- 2nd Lieutenant Oswald Gordon Platt MC For an act of gallantry not in the presence of the enemy
- Herbert Poate — Head of Curative Workshops, Military Orthopaedic Hospital, Shepherd's Bush
- Dorothy Martha Pocock. Night Superintendent, Young Women's Christian Association. Canteen at a Munitions Factory
- Arthur Reginald Poole, Timber Supplies Department, Board of Trade
- Arthur Milnes Pooley, Mechanical Warfare Department, Ministry of Munitions
- James Ablitt Pasifull Powell — Superintendent, Metropolitan Police
- Leslie Powne MRCS Commandant and Medical Officer-in-Charge, Crediton Auxiliary Hospital, Devonshire
- Captain William Francis Prentice — Technical Officer, Royal Air Force, and Directorate of Aircraft Production
- Mark Rushworth Preston — Secretary, Liverpool Committee for the Co-ordination of Naval, Military and Civil Requirements; Secretary, Liverpool Port Labour Committee
- William Edward Preston — Head of Malt and Liquor Section, Brewing Branch, Ministry of Food
- James Beer Price — For services with the British Expeditionary Force in France
- Violet Amelia Price — Member of the British War Mission to the United States of America
- Alice Maud Prichard — Commandant, Kitebrook Auxiliary Hospital, Moreton-in-Marsh, Gloucestershire
- Captain Charles Edmond Prince. Wireless Experimental Officer, 1st Class, Royal Air Force
- Edwin James Prince, Station Master, Waterloo Station, London and South Western Railway
- Harriet Gertrude Proger — Commandant, St. Fagan's Auxiliary Hospital, near Cardiff
- Albert Edward Prowse — Superintendent of a Workers Settlement at a Munitions Factory
- Ethne Philippa Pryor — Honorary Secretary, Prisoners of War Department, Royal Air Force Aid Committee
- William Frederick Purvis — Information Officer, Food Production Department
- Captain William Thomas Pyke — Assistant Secretary, Territorial Force Association of the County of Southampton
- John James Quann — Clerk, War Office
- Eliza Ellen Quick — Honorary Secretary, Warwickshire Local War Pensions Committee
- Herbert John Quick — Technical Adviser and Engineering Manager, Messrs. Harfield, Blaydon-on-Tyne
- Sidney Curtis Quick — Commandant of Voluntary Aid Detach ments, undertaking Disembarkation of Wounded at Southampton
- Dorothy Bradford — Honorary Quarter Master and Registrar, Military Wards, General Auxiliary Hospital, Nottingham
- Joseph Charles Radford — Egyptian State Railways
- Captain William Oswell Raikes — Staff Officer, 2nd Class, Training Division, Royal Air Force
- Thomas Rainford — Manager, Messrs. Worms & Co., Marseilles
- Edmund Cecil Ramsbottom — Labour Statistics Department, Ministry of Labour
- Francis Graham Ramsay — Executive Cable Engineer, General Post Office
- William Rankine — Principal, London County Council Technical School, Shoreditch
- Major Alfred Edward Rann MC Officer Commanding a South African Heavy Artillery Depot
- Gunner Sydney Ratcliff RN
- Lieutenant Norman Vincent Raven — Assistant Inspector, Small Arms, U.S.A., Ministry of Munitions
- Leonard Rawlinson — Town Clerk, Leamington; Clerk to the Local Tribunal
- Ralph George Joynson Rawlinson — Divisional Commander, Metropolitan Special Constabulary
- Captain Robert Osmond Raynor — Section Director, Accounts Department, Ministry of Munitions
- Thomas Reader — Clerk, War Office
- Ernest Alfred Reavill — Assistant Manager, Royal Small Arms Factory, Ministry of Munitions
- Edwin Reed — Acting Examiner of Naval Work on Staff of Inspector of Steel, Admiralty
- Ernest Wilmot Rees — Assistant Engineer, HM Office of Works
- Henry Rees — Secretary to the Parliamentary Recruiting Committee and National Service Committee
- T. E. Rees
- William Booth Reeve JP Mayor of Margate
- Lieutenant-Commander George Reeves RN
- Ethel Maude Reynolds — Examiner, Effects Branch, War Office
- Lieutenant Percival Richard Richards — For services with the British Expeditionary Force in France
- The Rev. Albert Thomas Richardson — Vicar of Bradford-on-Avon
- Annie Bertha Richardson — Assistant County Director for General Service, Oxfordshire Branch, British Red Cross Society
- Harry Richardson — Construction Works Manager, Messrs. Trollope and Colls
- Mary Anita Richardson
- Lieutenant Eric Keightley Rideal — Munitions Inventions Department
- Thomas Mortimer Riordan — Clerk, War Office
- Lieutenant John Ritchie — Second in Command of Army Medical Store, Woolwich
- Mary Thompson Ritchings Medical Officer-in-Charge, YMCA. Auxiliary Hospital, Swansea
- David Richard Roberts — Sub-Section Director, Central Stores Department, Ministry of Munitions
- Gomer Roberts JP Executive Officer, Denbigh War Agricultural Executive Committee
- Henry David Roberts — Honorary Secretary, Inter-Allied Exhibition, Ministry of Pensions
- Herbert Charles Roberts, Late Stores Manager to the British Red Cross Commission, East Africa
- Lieutenant-Commander John Roberts RN Admiralty Mail Officer, Chatham
- Archibald Campbell Robertson JP Secretary, Medical Department, Ministry of National Service
- Richard Frederick Robertson — Acting Contract Officer, Contract Department, Admiralty
- Thomas Ingle Robinson — Clerk, War Office
- James Allison Rodger — Marine Superintending Engineer, Great Central Railway, Grimsby
- Robert Rodham — Works Manager at a National Shell Factory
- Samuel Roebuck JP Junior General Secretary, Yorkshire Miners' Association
- Frederick Charles Rogers — Manager at a National Shell Factory
- Henry Rogers — Works Manager, The King's Norton Metal Co., Ltd.
- Herbert Rogers — Acting Chief Examiner, Exchequer and Audit Department
- Chief Carpenter James George Rogers RN
- Joan Rogers — Lady Superintendent, Army Pay Department
- Leila Harriette Romer — Lady Superintendent, YMCA Hut, Kensington High Street
- Captain James Rose — In Charge of an Ammunition Depot, attached to a Filling Factory
- Captain James Maxwell Ross FRCS County Director, Dumfries, Scottish Branch, British Red Cross Society
- John David McBeath Ross — Assistant Research Chemist, Chemical. Warfare Department, Ministry of Munitions
- Stella Maude Dalrymple Ross — Honorary Secretary, Southfield Auxiliary-Hospital, Duns, Berwickshire
- John William Rowe — Superintendent at one of HM Magazines, Ministry of Munitions
- Mabel Ruth Rowe — Comforts Branch of the Exeter Association of Voluntary Workers
- William George Rowe — Assistant Shipyard Manager, Messrs. J.S. White & Co., Cowes
- Joseph Samuel Rowland JP Chairman of Burton-on-Trent Local Tribunal and Belgian Refugees Committee — Chairman of Recruiting Committee
- Captain Charles Donovan Rowley — Sub-Section Director, Gun Ammunition Filling Department, Ministry of Munitions
- Elizabeth Lilian Royce — Lady Superintendent, YMCA, Havre
- Louise Alice Rudge — Member of the British War Mission to the United States of America
- Henry Weir Runciman — Head Foreman, Messrs. Donkins & Co., Newcastle
- Artificer Engineer Thomas Arthur Edwin Rush RN
- Diana Russell — Secretary, Wounded and Missing Enquiry Department, British Red Cross Commission, France
- Rachel Augusta Russell — Private Secretary to the Secretary and Assistant Secretary, Ministry of Munitions
- William Sidney Russell — Secretary and Manager, Leicester Armaments Group
- Henry Thomas Ruston — Chief Registrar, Sugar Commission
- George Henry Rutland — Chief Draughtsman, Warship Department, Messrs. Hawthorn, Leslie & Co.
- Allen Molyneux Baxter Sage — Clerk, War Office
- William Henry Salter — Assistant, Parliamentary and General Department, Ministry of Munitions
- William Sambridge, Foreman Carpenter, Messrs. Swan Hunter and Wigham Richardson, Newcastle
- Second Lieutenant Leslie Sample.For an act of gallantry not in the presence of the enemy
- Lieutenant Howard Sampson — For an act of gallantry not in the presence of the enemy
- Elizabeth Sandford — Limenaria Hospital and Sanatorium, Thasos
- Henry John Sankey — Assistant to Director of Inspection of Guns,' Ministry of Munitions
- Olga Joyce Forbes Sargint — Assistant Executive Officer, National War Savings Committee
- Ina Saunders — Voluntary Aid Detachment, New Zealand Expeditionary Force
- Major John Clifford Savage — Staff Officer, 2nd Class, Royal Air Force
- Harold Edward Sayer — Sub-Section Director, Munitions Accounts, Ministry of Munitions
- Fred Scarfe — Chief Clerk in the Traffic Office, Great Northern Railway
- Albert Edward Scarlett — Clerk to Depwade Local Tribunal
- Agnes Scatterty — Commandant, Spencer Street Auxiliary Hospital, Keighley
- James Rimmer Schofield — Principal and Director of the South Wales Wireless Training College
- Eloise Irene Scott of Messrs. C. Churchill and Co., Ltd.
- Gladys Mary Scott — In charge of Red Cross Invalid Kitchen, 29th General Hospital, Salonika
- James Scott — Deputy Assistant Inspector of Aeroplanes, Aeronautical Inspection, Ministry of Munitions
- John Scott — Joint Honorary Secretary, Sheffield War Savings Committee
- Muriel Elena Scott — Unit Administrator, Queen Mary's Army Auxiliary Corps
- Thomas Scowcroft JP Assistant County Director for Boltou District, East Lancashire, British Red Cross and Order of St. John of Jerusalem
- Shipwright Lieutenant George Edward Segrue RN Mechanical Training Establishment Royal Navy Barracks, Chatham
- Lieutenant Foster James Semmons — Anti-Aircraft Defences, Home Forces
- Agnes Hannah Settle — Commandant, Horncastle Auxiliary Hospital, North Lincolnshire
- Alfred Charles Seward — Head of Staff of Messrs. Mathwin's
- Frank Seymour — Deputy Assistant Inspector of Aeroplanes, Aeronautical Inspection, Ministry of Munitions
- Kathleen Shackleton — Coal Mines Department, Board of Trade
- Major Gerald Whittaker Sharp — Danger Officer at a National Filling Factory; for gallantry on the occasion of serious fire and explosion
- Lieutenant William Sharp — For services with the British Expeditionary Force in France
- James Edward Sharpe — Assistant to the Traffic Manager, Great Eastern Railway
- Gertrude Shaw — Assistant Secretary, YMCA. Munitions Department
- Herbert Shaw, District Surveyor, Ilford
- Katherine Shaw. Founder of the Great Yarmouth Association of Voluntary Workers
- George Nuttall Shawcross — Acting Locomotive Works Manager, Lancashire and Yorkshire Railway
- Mary Edith Sheffield — Welfare Superintendent, The Thames Ammunition Works, Limited
- Lieutenant John Short — For services with the British Expeditionary Force in France
- Emily Frances Siddon — President, Soldiers' and Sailors' Families Association, Huddersfield
- Annie Louise Simpson — Personal Shorthand Writer to the Prime Minister
- Major Geoffrey Hugh Simpson — For services with the Egyptian Expeditionary Force
- Captain Herbert Simpson MC Personal Assistant to the Deputy Chief of the Imperial General Staff
- Richard Arbuthnot Simson — Divisional Commander, Metropolitan Special Constabulary
- Edward Sinclair — Commissioned Master at Arms; Chief of Police, Royal Navy Barracks, Portsmouth
- Captain Samuel Christian Sinclair — Postal Services for Indian Troops, Egyptian Expeditionary Force
- William Simmonds Skelton JP Voluntary Worker, Ministry of Labour
- Donald McLean Skiffington — Outside Manager, Shipyard Department, Messrs. John Brown & Co.
- Lieutenant Herbert Fenton Skinner — For services with the British Expeditionary Force in France
- Ernest Clement Skurray JP Tractor Representative for Wiltshire, Food Production Department
- George Frederick Slade JP Clerk to Wallingford Rural Tribunal and Crowmarsh Local Tribunal
- Bertram Haylock Smale — Deputy Assistant Inspector of Aeroplanes, Aeronautical Inspection, Ministry of Munitions
- Robert Townsend Smallbones — British Vice-Consul at Stavanger, Norway
- Henry Sankey Smallwood — Executive Officer, Ministry of Munitions Area Clearing House, Birmingham
- Captain Charles Frederick Smedley — Quarter Master, New Zealand Convalescent Hospital, Hornchurch
- Olive Truda Marsden-Smedley — Assistant in Food Survey Board, Ministry of Food
- William Henry Smedley — Police Court Missionary, Grimsby
- Lieutenant Allan Bertram Smith — For an act of gallantry not in the presence of the enemy
- Annie Hansley Smith — Head of Filing and Registry Department, Joint Women's Voluntary Aid Detachment Department, Devonshire House
- Aubrey Golding Smith — Voluntary Driver, Motor Ambulance Convoy, British Red Cross Commission, Italy
- Constance Maitland Wilson Smith — Commandant, Hayle Place Auxiliary Hospital, Maidstone
- Dempster Smith — Messrs. Mirlees, Bickerton and Day
- Major Fred John Smith — YMCA Worker with Canadian Forces in England
- Second Lieutenant George Geoffrey Smith — Editor of The Motor Cycle; services in connection with recruiting
- Herbert Edwin Smith — Divisional Commander, Metropolitan Special Constabulary
- Anne Huntingdon Melville Smith — Honorary Women's Welfare Supervisor, The King's Norton Metal Co., Ltd.
- Second Lieutenant James Albert Smith — For an act of gallantry not in the presence of the enemy
- St. Osyth Mahala Eustace Smith — Honorary Secretary, Essex Local War Pensions Committee
- Honorary Sub-Lieutenant Walter Smithers RNVR
- Captain Alfred Smy — Master, Mercantile Marine
- Albert Charles Butler-Smythe FRCS Member of a Recruiting Medical Board
- Adam Currie Snaith — Honorary Secretary, Brandon and Byshottles War Savings Committee
- Captain Fred Hibbard Songhurst — Royal Air Force, in charge of Workshops in an Overseas Aircraft Park
- Gertrude Vera Sorby. Administrative Assistant, Supplies (Aeroplanes), Aircraft Production Department, Ministry of Munitions
- Captain John Percival Spanton. British Remount Commission, Canada
- Stanley Sparkes — Secretary, Mediterranean Conference, Ministry of Shipping
- Caroline Mary Spence — Assistant Commandant and Quarter Master, John Leigh Memorial Auxiliary Hospital for Officers, Altrincham
- Henry Bath Spencer — Assistant Inspector of Cartridges, Ministry of Munitions
- John Hayward Spencer — Deputy Assistant Inspector of Aeroplanes, Aeronautical Inspection, Ministry of Munitions
- Alfred Spicer — Steel Works Superintendent, The Port Talbot Steel Co., Ltd.
- Gavin Spiers — Head Foreman over Steel Workers, Messrs. W. Gray & Co., West Hartlepool
- Armande Spikins — Lady Driver, New Zealand Motor Transport
- Miss Eva Harvey Spite — Secretary to the Purchasing Committee of the-Royal Commission on Wheat Supplies
- Lieutenant Reginald Vernon Stafford — For an act of gallantry not in the presence of the enemy
- Major George Ernest Stagg — Staff Officer, 2nd Class, Royal Air Force
- Gladys Margaret Stainforth — Lady Superintendent, YMCA, Harfleur District
- Caroline Elinor Stammers — Organiser, Ladies' Red Cross Workroom, Alexandria
- Bernard Coatsworth Stampe — Manager, Messrs. T. C. Thompson & Son
- Leonard Stanley, Accountant, Manchester Munitions Board of Management
- Captain Frederick William Stanton. Army Service Corps
- Reginald George Stapledon — Director, Seed Testing Station, Food Production Department
- Frank Tapscott Stark — Assistant Manager, Alexandra Towing Company, Liverpool
- John Stark — Chief Clerk, and Chief Superintendent, City of London Police
- George Sydney Staunton — Superintendent and Assistant Chief Constable, East Suffolk Police
- Ethel Mary Steeds — Personal Clerk to the Director of General Branch, Local Authorities Division, Ministry of Food
- Charles Walter Steel — Divisional Red Cross Secretary, Norwich; Officer commanding Norwich Transport Corps
- Captain Henry Brown Torrie Stephen — For an act of gallantry not in the presence of the enemy
- Amy Frances Caroline Stephens — Accountant-General's Department, Admiralty
- Marjory Stephenson — Superintendent of Red Cross Sisters' Convalescent Home, Salonika
- John Home Stevenson
- Samuel Stevenson JP Messrs. Stevenson & Co., Glasgow
- Mary Jane Stewart — Superintendent of Surgical Dressings, Central Red Cross Work Rooms
- Marjorie Ellen Still — Honorary Secretary, Lambeth War Pensions Sub-Committee
- 2nd Lieutenant Charles Frederick Stirling — For an act of gallantry not in the presence of the enemy
- Lieutenant John Wilkie Stoddard — For an act of gallantry not in the presence of the enemy
- Isaac Stone — Senior Construction Works Manager, Messrs. Cubitt & Co.
- Henry Storey — Collector of Fishery Statistics of Board of Agriculture and Fisheries at Lowestoft
- Maud Eleanor Stoughton — War Office
- Lieutenant Frederick Stovell — For services with the Egyptian Expeditionary Force
- Tames Strachan — Acting Carriage Works Manager, London & North Western Railway
- Matthew Smellie Strang, District Superintendent, North British Railway
- Lieutenant Cyril John Strother — Technical Officer (Wireless Duties), Royal Air Force
- Florence Louise, Lady Stuart — Department of HM Procurator-General, Intelligence Branch
- George Barclay Stuart — Section Director, Finance Department, Ministry of Munitions
- Arthur Hope Sturdee — Manager, Small Tool Department, Coventry Ordnance Works, Limited
- Ethel Hariette Sturt — Late Assistant Commandant, Lytchett Manor Auxiliary Hospital, Dorsetshire
- Joseph Sullivan — County Councillor of Lanarkshire
- Ada Jane Summers — Organiser of Homes for Refugees, Stalybridge
- John Hamer Sutcliffe — Superintendent, Army Spectacle Depot
- John Sutherland — Section Manager at one of HM Factories, Ministry of Munitions
- Cecil Norman Stafford Sutton
- John Joseph Sutton — Secretary, Grimsby Fishing Vessel Owners Exchange Co., Ltd.
- David Swanson, Messrs. David Rowan & Co., Glasgow
- Robert William Swinnerton JP Chairman, Nuneaton Rural Tribunal
- Joseph Percival Sykes — First Class Clerk, Ministry of Pensions
- William Henry Sykes — Late Headmaster of Wapping Road Council School, Bradford
- Albert James Sylvester — Private Secretary to the Secretary to the War Cabinet
- William Frederick Symons — Senior Commandant, London Red Cross Ambulance Column
- Anna Alma Tadema — Voluntary Worker, War Refugees Committee
- James Tait — Manager, Messrs. T. W. Ridley & Sons
- Albert William Tangye — Chemist, Messrs. Brunner, Mond and Co., Ltd.
- Edward Tanner, Station Master, Littlehampton, London, Brighton and South Coast Railway
- Bramwell Taylor — Adjutant, Salvation Army; in charge of Salvation Army Ambulance Cars in France
- Colonel Herbert Brooke-Taylor VD Ministry of National Service
- Captain Frank Gellie Taylor — Quarter Master-General's Department, War Office
- Captain Geoffrey Fell Taylor — For an act of gallantry not in the presence of the enemy
- Harold Victor Taylor — Inspector, Supplies Division, Food Production Department
- Captain Louis Henry Taylor — Master of a Transport
- Richard Francis Taylor — Staff Officer, Census of Production Office
- Mary Jessie Tebbutt — Voluntary Red Cross Worker, Southampton
- Katherine Rose Tebbutt — Voluntary Red Cross Worker, Southampton
- Kenneth John Marmaduke Teesdale — Sub-Section Director, Allied Branch, Requirements and Statistics Department, Ministry of Munitions
- Robert Temple — Inventor
- Frank Edward Seymour Thake — Commandant in Charge of Motor Ambulance Transport, Reading
- Charles Henry Gordon Eyre Theobald — Wounded and Missing Enquiry Department, British Red Cross Society
- Captain The Hon. Percy Mansfield Thesiger — Royal Air Force, conducting an Equipment Branch in the Field
- Lieutenant Constantine Thirkell — Red Cross Transport Officer, County of Northumberland
- William Thirkell — Clerk, War Office
- Bert Thomas — Honorary Cartoonist, National War Sayings Committee
- Captain Edward Thomas — Master, Mercantile Marine
- Lieutenant Francis Henry Hale Thomas — Adjutant and Quarter Master Senior Officers' School
- Harry Jones Thomas, Civilian Acting Paymaster, Army Pay Department
- Lieutenant Sidney Arthur Thomas — Chief Clerk, Ordnance Committee, Ministry of Munitions
- William Gearing Thomas — Mineral Oil Production Department, Ministry of Munitions
- William Henry Thomas — National Service Representative, Middlesbrough
- Edward Thompson — Foreman Moulder, Messrs. Blair & Co., Stockton
- Jessie Catherine Thompson — Housekeeper, No. 2 New Zealand General Hospital
- Major Robert Broadwell Thompson — Field Cashier, Canadian Army Pay Corps
- William Henry Thompson — District Superintendent, Great Southern and Western Railway Company of Ireland, Cork
- William Nelson Thompson — Wharfinger, Cardiff Railway Company
- James Thomson — Outdoor Assistant to the Superintendent of the Line, Glasgow and South-Western Railway
- James Miln Thomson — Manager, Royal Gun Powder Factory, Ministry of Munitions
- Beatrice Mary Compton Thornhill — Organiser, Red Cross Depot, Bury St. Edmund
- John Sinclair Thyne — Manager, Messrs. S. P. Austin & Son, Sunderland
- Frank Parry Relf Tibbles — Sub-Section Director, Machine Tool Department, Ministry of Munitions
- Doris Ada Tiffen — Administrative Assistant, Department of Controller-General for Merchant Shipbuilding, Admiralty
- John Tinn — Works Manager, Messrs. R. Hornsby & Co., Grantham
- Ethel Annie Tizard — Secretary to Matron-in-Chief, Queen Alexandra's Imperial Military Nursing Service
- Edith Mary Elizabeth Todd — Matron, Royal Arsenal Hospital, Woolwich
- Emma Anne Toller — Lady Superintendent, YMCA, Paddington Station
- Dora Sloane Tomkinson — Assistant, Establishment Branch, Ministry of Munitions
- James Tonner — County Councillor of Lanarkshire
- Louis Frederick Tooth — Superintendent, Meter Department, Commercial Gas Company
- Harry Topham — Assistant Inspector of Steel, Admiralty
- Christopher Edward Town — Secretary, Tea Control Committee, Ministry of Food
- Margery Townshend — Member of the British War Mission to the United States of America
- Walter Trathan — Staff Clerk, War Office
- 2nd Lieutenant Francis James Treanor — For an act of gallantry not in the presence of the enemy
- Captain John Linton Treloar — Officer Commanding Australian War Records Section, Australian Imperial Force
- William Ewart Gladstone Trigg — Superintendent and Chief Clerk, Lincolnshire Police
- Alice Trounce Superintendent at a Munition Workers' Canteen
- George John Tucker — In charge of Red Cross Motor Ambulance work, Liverpool
- Ina Aveling Tucker — Commandant, Hart House Auxiliary Hospital, Burnham, Somerset
- George Drummond Turnbull — Chief Engineer, Messrs. W. S. Miller & Co.
- Adolphus Frederick Franklyn Turner — Clerk, War Office.
- Cameron Turner — Works Manager, Messrs. McKie & Baxter, Glasgow
- Catherine Mary Turner — Commandant, Wall Hall Auxiliary Hospital, Hertfordshire
- Robert Reginald Johnston Turner — Secretary, Munitions Works Board
- William Walker Turner, Accountant, Stores Department, British Red Cross Society Headquarters
- S. Tweedale — Messrs. Tweedale & Smalley, Manchester
- Captain William Glenholme Tweedy — Quarter Master, No. 1 New Zealand General Hospital
- 2nd Lieutenant Arthur Henry Tytherleigh — For an act of gallantry not in the presence of the enemy
- Chief Gunner Walter Jefferey Uden RN
- Percy Umney — Clerk to the Richmond Guardians, Surrey
- Rachel Lilian May Usher — Member of the British War Mission to the United States of America
- William Le Vack — Principal, Statistical1 Branch, War Trade Department
- Sybil Vane — Private Secretary to the Director-General of National Labour Supply, Ministry of National Service
- Lieutenant Arthur Percy Vanneck — Anti-Aircraft Defences, Home Forces
- Captain Robert Arnold Vansittart — Recruiting Officer in charge of the Westminster Sub-Area, Ministry of National Service
- Lieutenant William Vaughan RN
- William John Veale — Assistant, Parliamentary and General Department, Ministry of Munitions
- James Richard Vellacott — Managing Partner, Messrs. J. R. Vellacott & Co.
- Margaret Venables — Superintendent of Typists, War Office
- Ella Margaret Venn — Superintendent of Garment Room, Central Red Cross Work Rooms, London
- Captain Charles Vickers — Master, Mercantile Marine
- Henry Frederic Vilmet Oldham-Vilmet — Assistant Secretary, Ministry of National Service, London Region
- Lieutenant George Waddingham — Australian Divisional Artillery
- Thomas Callander Wade — County Director for Stirlingshire, Scottish Branch, British Red Cross Society
- Captain William John Wade — Assistant Director of Cold Storage, Ministry of Food
- John Waghorne — Chairman, Cheltenham Local Tribunal
- Ellen Charlotte Wagstaffe — Welfare Supervisor at a National Shell Factory
- Mabel Frances Hewitt Wainwright — Honorary Secretary, Rycroft Hall Auxiliary Hospital, Audenshaw, Manchester
- James Waite — Senior Assistant Inspector of Munitions Areas; in charge of Steel Research Section, Ministry of Munitions
- William Birkbeck Wakefield — Member of the War Emergency Committee, YMCA
- Alfred John Waldegrave — Accountant-General's Department, General Post Office
- Alice Waldegrave — Secretary, Sherborne Division, British Red Cross and Order of St. John of Jerusalem; Quarter Master, Castle Auxiliary Hospital, Sherbome
- William Herbert Walden — Assistant Inspector of Medical Supplies, Army Medical Service
- Lieutenant Keith Jerome Walker — For an act of gallantry not in the presence of the enemy
- William Joseph Wall — Second Class Manager, Coventry Employment Exchange, Ministry of Labour
- Lieutenant Martin Oliver Walsh — For an act of gallantry not in the presence of the enemy
- Edna Walter — Honorary Secretary of National Economy Exhibition, Manchester
- Ada Grace Ward — Commandant, Leckhampton Court Auxiliary Hospital, Cheltenham
- Lieutenant-Colonel Edward Ward — Assistant Inspector, Sheljs (Technical), Ministry of Munitions
- John Henry Ward — Acting First Assistant Electrical Engineer, Department of Director of Dockyards and Repairs, Admiralty
- Lieutenant Tom Ward — For an act of gallantry not in the presence of the enemy
- Lieutenant Arthur Kingsley Wardroper — For an act of gallantry not in the presence of the enemy
- William Findlay Warnock — Chief Draughtsman in Shipyard of Messrs. John Brown & Co.
- Marmont Warren — Central Marine Engineering Works, West Hartlepool
- Donald Waters — Superintendent, Metropolitan Police
- Dorothy Emily Watkins — Superintendent, Young Women's Christian Association. Munition Workers' Canteen
- John Stewart Watkins — Steam Tug Owner
- Captain Ernest Alfred William Watney — For services with the British Expeditionary Force in France
- Albert Harold Joseph Watson — Naval Store Department, Admiralty
- James Watson — Foreman Turner, Messrs. David Rowan & Co., Glasgow
- John Watson JP Commander, Hull Special Constabulary
- Marguerite Audrey Watson — Voluntary Aid Detachment, Cairo
- Mildred Jane Musgrave Watson — Head of Women's Section, National War Savings Committee
- Madge Robertson Watt — Chief Organiser of Women's Institutes, Food Production Department
- Captain John William Watt — Master of a Transport
- John Watters — Manager of Iron Department, Messrs. Workman, Clarke & Co., Belfast
- Lieutenant Charles Henry Weaver — Stores Department, Red Cross Commission, Mesopotamia
- Captain Alexander Webster — Master, Mercantile Marine
- Lilian Emily Welch — Secretary, Packing Department, Queen Mary's Needlework Guild
- Lieutenant Robert Wellington MC Head of Fruit Section, Horticultural Division, Food Production Department
- Mildmay Francis Wells — Late of Mineral Resources Department, Ministry of Munitions.
- Selkirk Wells — Navy and Army Canteen Board
- Charles West DCM Recruiting Duties
- Gertrude Cleave Westbrook — Prisoners of War Information Bureau
- John Richard Westcott — Secretary, Alexandria Conference, Ministry of Shipping
- Captain Reginald Granville Westmacott — For services with the British Expeditionary Force in France
- Henry Gould Weston — Supervisor Clerk, Registry — Directorate of Mobilization, War Office
- Frederick Malcolm Wharton — Manager, The New Explosives Co., Ltd.
- Ursula Mary Wheble — Honorary Superintendent, Reading War Hospital Supply Depot
- Edward Thomas Wheeler — Chief Officer of the Fire Brigade at a National Filling Factory; for gallantry on the occasion of a serious fire and explosion
- George Frederick Whiles — Deputy Superintendent of Paper, Stationery Office
- Eileen Whitaker — Commandant, Babworth Hall Auxiliary Hospital, East Retford, Nottinghamshire
- Charles Arthur White — Principal, Aston Technical School, Birmingham
- Jessie McHardie White — Principal Matron, Australian Army Nursing Service
- Percival White — Honorary Secretary, Plymouth War Savings Committee
- Mary Catharine Whitehead — Lady Superintendent, YMCA, King's Cross Station
- Roy Drummond Whitehorn — General Secretary for Army Work in India, YMCA
- Captain Frederick Ernest Banister Whitfield — Royal Air Force (Wing Adjutant)
- Gunner Ernest James Whiting RN
- Mary Fanny Whittaker — Adjutant, Salvation Army
- Lieutenant Geoffrey Budibent Whitworth — Visiting Officer, Stores Department, Boulogne, British Red Cross Commission, France
- Lieutenant Aubrey John Graham-Wigan — For an act of gallantry not in the presence of the enemy
- Edith Marguerite Wignall — Officer-in-Charge, St. John Hospital, Tattenhall
- Norman Ward Wild — In charge of Statistical Section of Inspection Department, Ministry of Munitions
- Chief Boatswain Edward H. Wilder RN Assistant to King's Harbour Master, Gibraltar
- Margaret Mabel Wilkins — Member of the British War Mission to the United States of America
- Martin Wilkinson — Engine Works Machine Shop Foreman, Messrs. Swan, Hunter and Wigham Richardson
- Emma Christine Williams Medical Officer at a Shell Filling Factory
- Leonard Henry Williams — Ministry of National Service
- Lieutenant Percy Alec Williams — For an act of gallantry not in the presence of the enemy
- Rhoda Mary Westropp Williamson — Lady Clerk, Finance Department, War Office
- Charles Willis — Clerk, War Office
- Maud Mary Willis — Joint Honorary Secretary, Rotherham Belgian Refugees Committee
- The Rev. Michael Hamilton Gibson Willis — County Director, County Down, Irish Branch, British Red Cross Society
- Marian Margaret Wills — Organising Secretary, American Women's War Relief Fund
- Edith Annie Wilson — Superintendent at Munition Workers Canteen
- George Alexander Wilson. Steel Works Manager, The Cargo Fleet Iron Co., Ltd.
- James Wilson — Member of the Appeal Tribunal of the County of Lanark
- Margaret Rowley Wilson — Commandant and Quarter Master, Ash Auxiliary Hospital, Sandwich, Kent
- Robert James Wilson — Treasury Solicitor's Department, Law Courts Branch, Admiralty Division
- William Major Wilson — Staff Clerk, Local Government Board
- Ada Mary Winder — County Secretary, County Cork, Irish Branch, British Red Cross Society
- Captain John Travell Witts — For services with the British Expeditionary Force, Salonika
- Evelyn Wolferstan — Joint Women's Voluntary Aid Detachment Department, Devonshire House
- Gamble Ekin Vickers Wood — Sub-Section Director, Contracts Department, Ministry of Munitions
- William Stanley Woodcock — Acting Deputy Commissioner, St. John Ambulance Brigade, West Lancashire
- Walter Lee Woodhams — Organiser of Assistance to Belgian Refugees
- Nor ah Blanche Woodman — Matron, Belgian Refugees Camp, Earl's Court
- Constance Ada Woods — President of the Munitions Canteen Lady Workers at an important Munitions Centre
- Charles William Woodward — Secretary, War Office Commodities Committee, War Trade Department
- Annie Elizabeth Wordsworth — Head Mistress of the Girls' Department, Wrexham County School
- Captain William Percy Worth — Red Cross Transport Officer, Folkestone Headquarters Staff
- Nora Mary Bayley Worthington — Voluntary Aid Detachment Commandant, British Red Cross Commission, France
- Gwenyth Worthington — Commandant, Foxlowe Auxiliary Hospital, Leek, Staffordshire
- Albert Charles Wren — Clerk, London Regional Headquarters, Ministry of National Service
- Calvin Wright — Chief Special Constable, Great Grimsby Special Constabulary
- Clare Elise Ellington Wright — War Trade Intelligence Department
- 2nd Lieutenant Douglas William Wright — For an act of gallantry not in the presence of the enemy
- Florence Helena Wright — Commandant, "Balmoral " Auxiliary Hospital, Llandudno
- Mary Veronica Wright — Department of HM Procurator General, Intelligence Branch
- Major Stephen Wright — Acting Inspector of Army Catering
- Thomas Wright — Outside Engine Works Manager, Messrs. Harland and Wolff, Belfast
- Constance Wrigley — Part Founder of Timberhurst Auxiliary Hospital, Bury, East Lancashire
- Katharina Montagu Wyatt — Commandant, Lady Ridley's Hospital, Carlton House Terrace, London
- Lily Doughtie-Wylie — Limenaria Hospital and Sanatorium, Thasos
- Ellen Yeld — Chief Dairy Instructress to the Hereford County Council
- Clarence Ross Young — Clerk, Local Government Board
- Annie Youngman — Higher Grade Woman Clerk, Ministry of Shipping
- Lieutenant John Copeland Zigomala — For an act of gallantry not in the presence of the enemy

India

- Ismay Gertrude Hardy
- Mabel Alice Gracey
- Tempe Kealy — Secretary (temporarily President) of the Ladies' Red Cross Committee, North-West Frontier Province
- Dorothy Starr Jackson
- Mary Louisa Browning — Local Secretary of the Madras War Fund Ladies' Depot, Trichur, Cochin State, Madras
- Vera Fremantle. Jnanendranath GuptaJnanendra Nath Gupta, Indian Civil Service; Magistrate and Collector, Rangpur, Bengal
- Antoinette Clarke
- Hilda Mumford
- Mrs. Stennet Hemingway
- Mrs. Dutt
- Mrs. Euphan Nevill
- Florence Ida Peirse
- Mrs. Caro Playfair
- Charles Frederick Laslett — Chief Engineer, Royal Indian Marine, Bengal
- Alice Stuart Milne
- Robina Olive Sullivan — Secretary, Ganjam District Ladies' Red Cross Depot
- Dorothy Broomfield — President, Women's Branch of the War Relief Fund, Ahmedabad
- Visalakshi Narayana Ayyar
- Commissary and Honorary Major James Arbery. India Miscellaneous List, Survey of India
- Lieutenant-Commander John Chappell Ward — Royal Indian Marine; Assistant Port Officer and Deputy Shipping Master, Calcutta
- Henry John Andrews — Indian Medical Service; Medical Officer in charge of the Thomas Emery Hospital at Moradabad, United Provinces
- Prasanna Kumar Ray, Dora Stewert de Chazal. Nellore District representative of the Madras War Fund Ladies' Depot.
- Herbert Hunley Shaw — Deputy Collector and District Assistant Recruiting Officer, Bulandshahr, United Provinces
- Badu Budh -Sen — Deputy Collector. Muzaffarnagar, United Provinces
- Pandit Manmohan Nath Gurtu — Deputy Collector, Etah, United Provinces
- Babu Sardar Singh — Deputy Collector. Muttra, United Provinces
- Pandit Ganga Dutt Joshi, Tahsildar, Kham Superintendent, Garhwal, United Provinces
- Donald St. John Havock — Superintendent of Excise, 4th Grade, Burma
- Richard Robertson — Indian Telegraph Department, Deputy Superintendent Engineering
- Gwendoline Gittings
- Captain Thomas George Green VD Superintendent, Government Printing Press, and Acting Commandant, Volunteer Rifles, Nagpur, Central Provinces
- Honorary Captain Nawab Ahmed Nawaz Khan, Saddozai, Nawab of Dera, Cantonment Magistrate, Dera Ismail Khan, North-West Frontier Province
- Ernest Robert Powell — Senior Inspector of Factories, Nagpur; Central Provinces
- Rao Bahadur Shrinivasulu Naidu — Divisional Forest Officer, Nagpur, Central Provinces
- M. Narsing Rao — Divisional Forest Officer, Bhandara, Central Provinces
- William Hayward — Extra Assistant Resident, Bushire, Persian Gulf
- Thomas Gregson — Locomotive and Carriage Superintendent, Oudh and Rohilkhand Railway, Lucknow, United Provinces
- Charles James Knowles, Personal Assistant to the Adjutant-General in India
- Honorary Captain Devasahayam Sardar Bahadur — late Subedar-Major, 2nd Queen Victoria's Own Sappers and Miners; Honorary Aide-de-Camp to His Excellency the Commander-in-Chief in India
- Honorary Captain Bishan Singh Kathait — Sardar Bahadur, late Subedar-Major, 9th Gurkha Rifles
- Babu Srimanta Kumar Das Gupta — Sub-Divisional Officer of Kurigram, Rangpur, Bengal
- Nirmal Sankar Sen — Sub-Divisional Officer, Nator, Rajshahi, Bengal
- Percival James Anderson — Extra Assistant Commissioner, Ghakwal, Jielum District, Punjab
- Munshi Muhammad Zaman Khan — Extra Assistant Commissioner, Rawalpindi, Punjab
- Sardar Bahadur Khan — Extra Assistant Commissioner, Attock, Punjab
- Lala Amar Nath Extra Assistant Commissioner, Gujranwala, Punjab
- Abdul Majid Khan — Barrister-at-Law; Extra Assistant Commissioner, Attock, Punjab
- Babu Shyam Naryan Singh — Personal Assistant to the Commissioner, Bihar and Orissa
- Babu Arun Kumar Bose — Deputy Magistrate, Rauchi, Bihar and Orissa
- Babu Lakshminarayan Patnaik — Munsif, Palamau, Bihar and Orissa
- Ramchandra Moreshwar Pardhi — Extra Assistant Commissioner, Akola, Berar, Central Provinces
- Khan Sahib Ishtiak Ali — Extra Assistant Commissioner, Damoh, Central Provinces
- Rai Bahadur Bhola Nath — Extra Assistant Commissioner, Baluchistan
- U. Kmuin Manik. Siem of Mylliem, Assam
- U. Harison. Siem of Rambray, Assam
- Frances Carr Ross Alston.
- Narendra Nath Ghatak — Barrister-at-Law, High Court, Calcutta
- Pandit Daulat Ram Kalia — Barrister-at-Law, Ferozepore, Punjab
- Serene Cowasji
- Rai Bahadur Gopal Das Bhandari — Pleader, Amritsar, Punjab
- Rai Bahadur Pandit Davi Chand — Pleader, Jullundur, Punjab
- Babu Pyari Lai Dass — Pleader; Chairman Dacca Municipality, Bengal
- Babu Kamini Kumar Das. Vakil, Chittagong, Bengal
- Ram Krishna Raoji Jaywant — Pleader, Amravati, Berar, Central Provinces
- Lillian May McCaully Hayes — Secretary, Trichinopoly Ladies' Red Cross Depot
- Dr Vinayak Narayan Bhajekar, Bombay
- Surat Kunwar Chaudhuri (Lahore). Benares State Service, United Provinces
- Edwin Andrew Cuthbert Hindmarsh FRCS LRCP Officiating Civil Surgeon, Muzaffarpur, Bihar and Orissa
- May Hall-Wright
- Clement Hall Brierly — Superintendent, sub pro tem, Central Prison, Yeravda, Bombay
- Subedar Wali Muhammad Khan — 25th Punjabis, Bengal Police, Inspector of Armed Police, Malda, Bengal
- Helene Robson. Hon — Secretary, Ajmer-Merwara Branch of the British Red Cross Society and the Order of St. John of Jerusalem
- Ethel Tydeman
- Sidney Hugh Reaks — Senior Master Pilot, Officiating Assistant Port Officer and Deputy Shipping Master, Calcutta
- Khan Bahadur Chaudhuri Karam Ilahi Chaththa — Honorary Magistrate of Ahmednagar, Gujranwala District, Punjab
- Rai Sahib Lala Bam Gopal — Landowner and Honorary Magistrate and vice-president, Municipal Committee, Sirsa, Hissar District, Punjab
- Khan Sahib Chaudhri Fazal Ali — Honorary Magistrate and Sub-Eegistrar, Ajnala, Gujrat District, Punjab
- Khan Bahadur Arbab Muhammad Azam Khan, of Kotla — Honorary Magistrate, 1st Class, North-West Frontier Province
- Khan Bahadur Haji Karim Bakhsh, Sethi, of Peshawar — Honorary Magistrate, 2nd Class, North-West Frontier Province
- Lekhraj Khiomal, of Hyderabad (Sind), Bombay
- Pestan Shah Nussedwanji Vakil — Proprietor, Victoria Iron Works, Ahmedabad, Bombay
- John Howitson Wiggett — of Messrs. T. E. Thomson & Co.; Master, Trades Association, Calcutta
- Margaret Gillespie — Honorary Secretary, Bassein Branch of the British Red Cross Society and Order of St. John of Jerusalem
- Raja Mahendra Ranjan Ray Chaudhuri — Zamindar of Kakina, Rangpur, Bengal
- Babu Manindra Chandra Singh — Zamindar, Bengal
- Chaudhri Farzand Ali Khan — Landowner; Zaildar of Sohna and Honorary Magistrate, Gurgaon District, Punjab
- Norman Grant — Landowner, Sahibganj, Bihar and Orissa
- Babu Shiba Prasad Singh — of Jharia. Landowner, Bihar and Orissa
- Rai Sahib Chandra Narayan Gupta — Landowner, Bihar and Orissa
- Maurice Roberts Wilson Hart, Indian Subordinate Medical Department; Assistant Surgeon, Madras
- M. R. Ry. Tiruvadi Chidambara Ramaswami Sarma Avargal — Sub-Assistant Surgeon, Madras
- Khan Sahib Sayad Nazir Hussain. Indian Subordinate Medical Department; Civil Surgeon, Mianwali, Punjab
- Babu Upendra Nath Sen — Shipping Broker, Calcutta
- Babu Atal Chandra Ghose — Shipping Broker, Calcutta
- Jamsetji Dinshaw Antia — Audit-Department, Bombay, Baroda, and Central India Railway, Bombay
- Georgina Jessie Chisholm Davis — In charge of the Bhopal Agency Centre of the Joint War Committee, Central India
- Mary Denham Spence — In charge of the Bundelkhand Agency Centre of the Joint War Committee, Central India
- M. R. Ry. Diwan Bahadur Mandayam Ananda Pillay Parthasarathi Ayyangar Avargal, B.L. — Retired Cashier, Bank of Madras
- Gertrude Jessop — Formerly Matron, Hospital Ship, Madras
- Margaret Carrick — Nurse, Madras
- Margaret Deaken — Bombay
- Adeline Elizabeth Whitcombe — Poona, Bombay
- Lokendra Nath Palit
- Annie Ewing — Superintendent, Bible Women's Institute, Entally, Calcutta
- Khan Bahadur Mir Tawaqqul Husain — of Pirpur, Fyzabad, United Provinces
- Nawab Ahmad Saiyed Khan — of Chitari, District Bulandshahr, United! Provinces
- Chaudhri Data Ram — of Daurala, District Meerut, United Provinces
- Rai Bahadur Dharma Nand Joshi — Honorary Magistrate, Almora, United Provinces
- Pandit Maharaj Kishan — Tahsildar of Moga, Ferozepore District, Punjab
- Subedar-Major Ashaq Ali — of Kalanaur, Rohtak District, Punjab
- Mian Yar Muhammad Khan of Jahan Khelan in Hoshiarpur District, Punjab
- Resaldar. Bahadur Sahaj Ram — of Mehm, District Rohtak, Punjab
- Sardar Fateh Singh — of Sayanwala, Ferozepore District; Risaldar in the Supply and Transport Reserve, Punjab
- Raja Fateh Singh — of Lahore, Punjab
- Flora Wardle — Bihar and Orissa
- Anna Katherine Ashe — Honorary Lady Superintendent, Soldiers Home, Rawalpindi
- Babu Jagin Sangma — Laskar, Garo Hills, Assam
- Khan Sahib Maulvi Mohammad Abdul Latif — Mauzadar, Garo Hills, Assam
- Rai Sahib Lala Tirath Ram Shah
- Khatri, of Nawashahr — Honorary Secretary, Notified Area, Nawashahr, North-West Frontier Province
- Khan Bahadur Wadera Nur Muhammad — Bangalbai, Kalat State, Baluchistan
- Henry Hart — Mysore Residency
- Philippa Vores

Egypt and the Sudan

- Percy Harry East — Director of Works in the Public Works Department
- Charles Leavers Hall — Director of Works in the Public Works Department
- Arthur Henry Johnstone, Business Manager, YMCA, Egyptian Expeditionary Force
- Alexander Robertson Craig — Chief Archivist, Residency, Cairo
- Arthur Owen Williams Postmaster, Cairo
- Lieutenant George Wyman Bury RNVR
- The Rev. Samuel Hanna Kennedy YMCA, Alexandria
- Arthur Sidney Merton — Director of Commercial Section in Ministry of Agriculture
- George Ronald Storrar — Divisional Engineer, Sudan Government Railways
- Charles Craven Howell Walker — Commercial Agent, Sudan Government; His Britannic Majesty's Consul for Western Abyssinia
- John Edgar Williams — Chief Electrical Engineer, Public Works Department, Sudan Government
- Arthur Philip Bolland — Secretary, Sudan Agency

Honorary Members

- Ali Ibrahim Bey — Senior Assistant Surgeon at Kasr-el-Ainy Hospital, Cairo
- Wadih Bey Birbari — Principal Medical Officer, Nagazig Hospital
- George Bey Mishalany — Superintendent of Workshops, Department of Stores

== See also ==
- 1918 Birthday Honours - Full list of awards.
