= John Gemmill =

British businessman, private banker, storekeeper, and the first auctioneer of Singapore

John Gemmill was a British businessman, private banker, storekeeper, and the first auctioneer of Singapore. He donated the Gemmill Fountain to the public in 1864.

== Biography ==
Gemmill born in the United Kingdom, and moved to Singapore in 1828. He was originally a shopkeeper, and after the Singapore Temperance Society was formed in 1837, he released an advertisement for his shop, stating that he was selling alcohol. He later became an auctioneer, and was the first auctioneer in the colony. In January 1839, Gemmill began a private banking business, as there were no banks in the colony yet. He bought Scott's Hill, and renamed it Gemmill's Hill.

In 1864, Gemmill donated a marble drinking fountain to the government of Singapore for public use. The fountain was named Gemmill Fountain, and was largely forgotten until 1923, when it was found in a Municipal store and placed in front of the Victoria Memorial Hall. Gemmill Lane was named in honour of Gemmill after his death.
