= Gemmill Fountain =

Public drinking fountain in Singapore

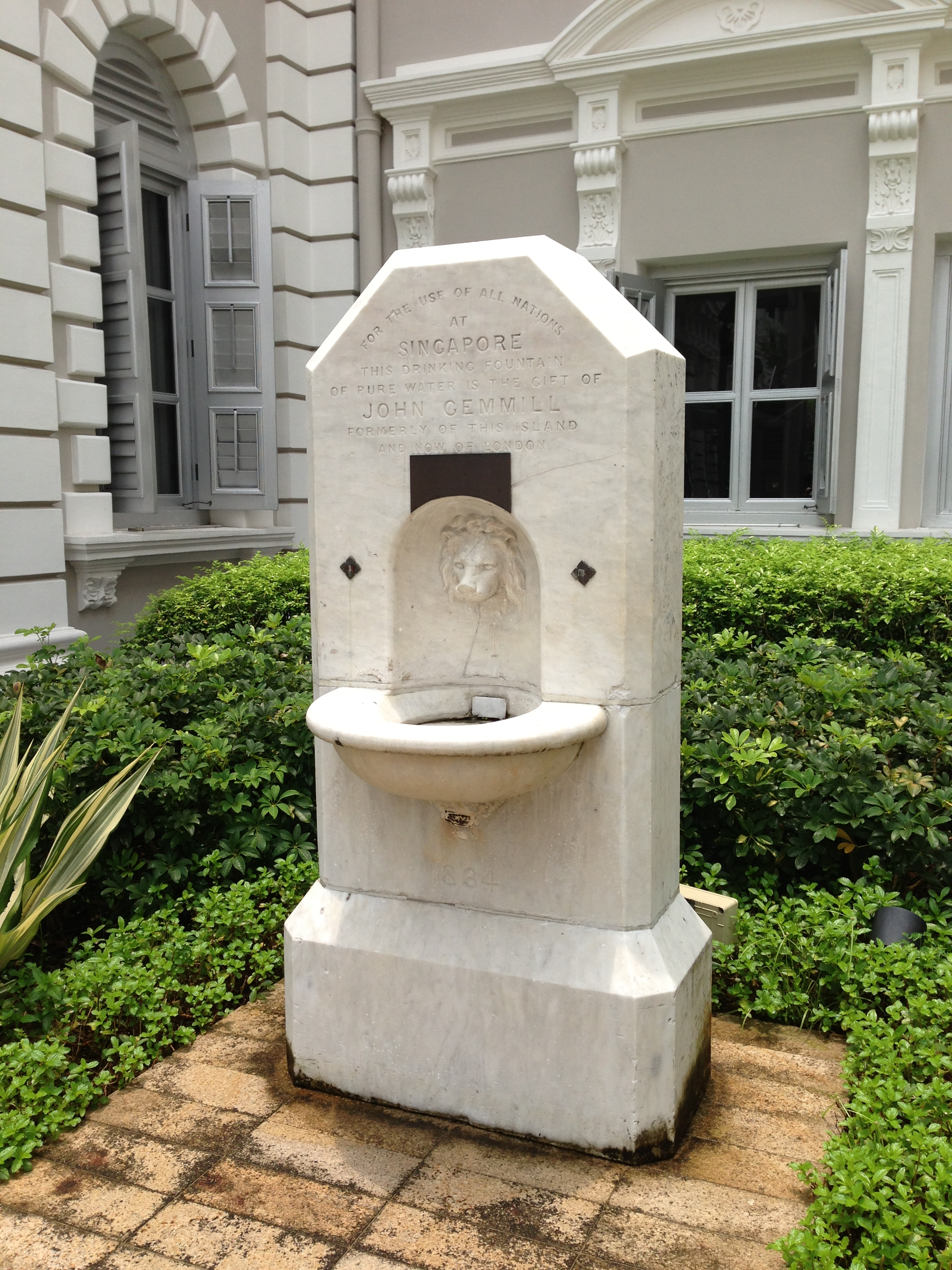
The fountain at the National Museum of Singapore

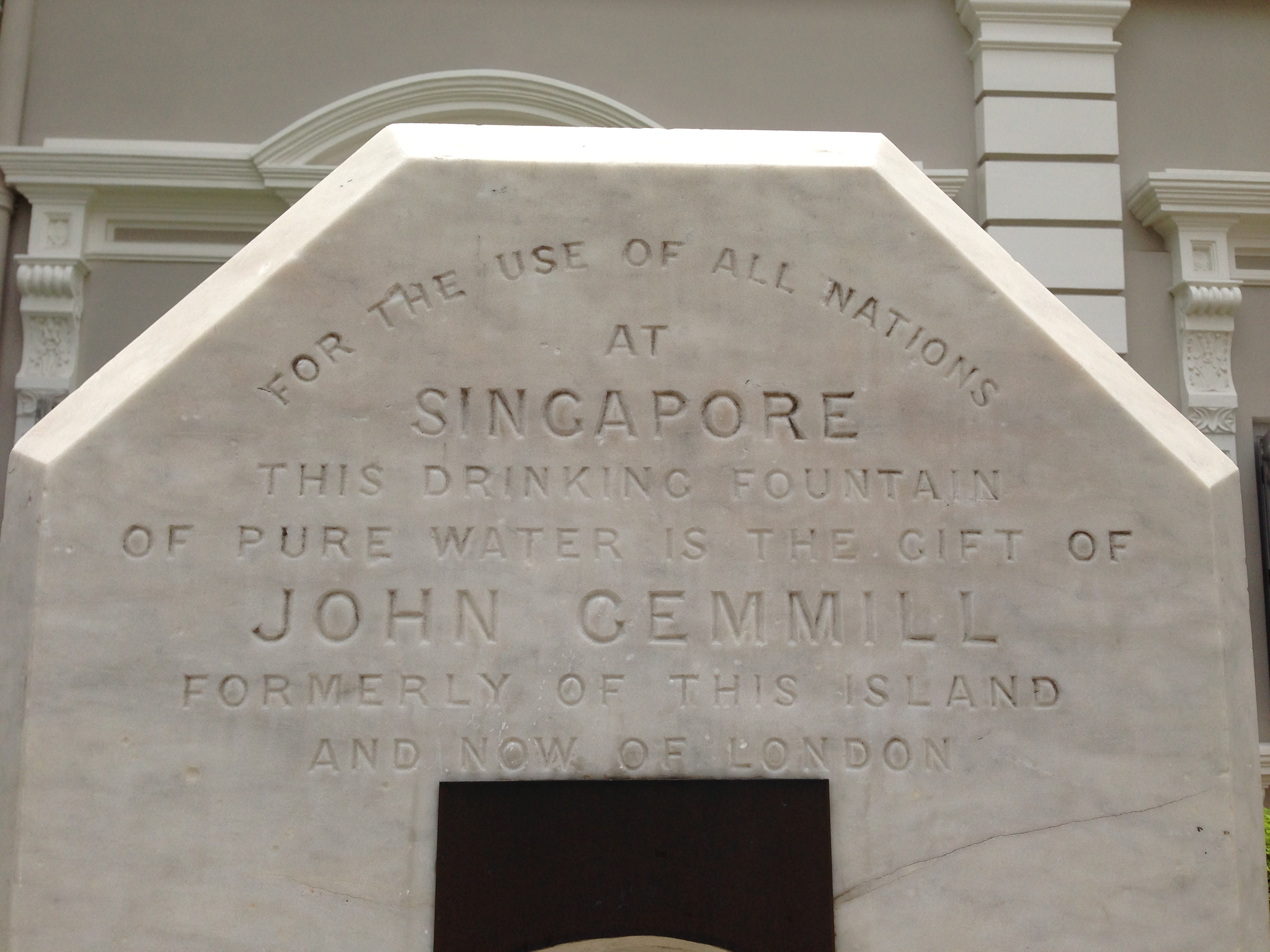
The fountain's inscription

The Gemmill Fountain was the first public drinking fountain in Raffles Place, Singapore. It was eventually relocated to the National Museum of Singapore, where it currently stands.

== History ==
The marble fountain was donated by businessman John Gemmill, the first auctioneer in Singapore, in 1864, after Gemmill had already retired to London. The fountain featured a carved lion head, through which water ran. However, by 1939, water no longer ran through the fountain. The words "FOR THE USE OF ALL NATIONS AT SINGAPORE. THIS DRINKING FOUNTAIN IS THE GIFT OF JOHN GEMMILL, FORMERLY OF THIS ISLAND AND NOW OF LONDON" are inscribed on the front of the fountain. It was placed at Raffles Place, where it remained as late as 1919 before being moved elsewhere. The fountain was largely forgotten until it was found in a Municipal store in 1923, after which it was returned to the centre of Raffles Place. By 1950, the fountain had been relocated in front of the Victoria Memorial Hall. It stood to the left of the Statue of Sir Stamford Raffles.

During World War II, the fountain's water spout was damaged. The fountain was then brought to the National Museum of Singapore for safekeeping in 1967. Sand was placed in the fountain's basin to prevent the breeding of mosquitos. By 1970s, plans were being made to restore and potentially relocate the fountain. The fountain was situated in front of the museum's Young People Gallery. It was repaired at a cost of $2,100 in 1974. By 1995, although the fountain was still operational, green algae had grown at its basin. When the museum underwent renovations in 2002, the fountain was placed in the Heritage Conservation Centre. It was restored from September to December 2009 and placed at the outdoor terrace of the National Museum of Singapore.
