= Jane Gemmill =

Scottish temperance activist

Jane Ferguson Gemmill, MBE (17 July 1855 – 20 February 1943) was a Scottish temperance activist who founded the Whiteinch Band of Hope and the Partich Branch of the Woman's Christian Temperance Union (W.C.T.U.). She was also affiliated with the British Women's Temperance Association (B.W.T.A.) and the Scottish Temperance Alliance. Gemmill was the only woman candidate in the municipal election of 1907 in the Glasgow district.

== Biography ==
Jane Gemmill was born in Glasgow, 17 July 1855. Her father was John Ferguson, a shipbuilder in Glasgow, and his wife, Margaret Ann Miller.

She was educated privately in Glasgow and London.

She became identified with the temperance cause in early life, and took an active part in temperance work ever since. She was the founder (1876) of the Whiteinch Band of Hope, the largest in Scotland, of which she served as honorary secretary until 1880.

On 17 March 1880, she married William Gemmill, a solicitor of Glasgow. William's father was Peter Gemmill of Glasgow.

She founded the Partich Branch of the W.C.T.U. in 1894, serving as honorary secretary from 1894 to 1922, and as president from the latter year to at least 1925. She was honorary secretary of the B.W.T.A., which had over 60,000 members, from 1912 to 1921; and was vice-president from 1921 to at least 1925. She served as honorary secretary (1902–13) and vice-president (1913–23) of the Glasgow District Union of the B.W.T.A., and was president since 1923. In 1913, she attended the Fourteenth International Congress Against Alcoholism held at Milan, Italy.

The only woman candidate in the municipal election of 1907 in the Glasgow district was Gemmill, who stood for the fourth ward of Partick. She was opposed by George Douglas, who proclaimed himself "against Socialism", and by George Gilchrist, Labour candidate. Gemmill conducted a vigorous campaign, addressing several open-air meetings of shipyard workers, and was invariably well received. The chief points in her programme were temperance reform, efficiency with economy, measures for the diminution of infantile mortality, and the promotion of sanitation and health. Gemmill was defeated by both opponents.

During World War I, she was a convener of two Belgian Homes House Committees; Honorary Secretary to two canteens in Munition Works; member, Committee of B.W.T.A. Soldiers' Club; chair, Partick War Savings Association; and president, Partick Infant Welfare Visitors.

She was also a member of the executive committee of the Scottish Temperance Alliance, which was formed in 1924.

Her home was at 45 Westbourne Gardens, Glasgow.

== Awards and honours ==
In the 1918 Birthday Honours, Gemmill was appointed a Members of the Order of the British Empire by King George V in recognition of her war-time services.
