= 1896 =

1896 in various calendars
- Gregorian calendar: 1896; MDCCCXCVI
- Ab urbe condita: 2649
- Armenian calendar: 1345; ԹՎ ՌՅԽԵ
- Assyrian calendar: 6646
- Baháʼí calendar: 52–53
- Balinese saka calendar: 1817–1818
- Bengali calendar: 1302–1303
- Berber calendar: 2846
- British Regnal year: 59 Vict. 1 – 60 Vict. 1
- Buddhist calendar: 2440
- Burmese calendar: 1258
- Byzantine calendar: 7404–7405
- Chinese calendar: 乙未年 (Wood Goat); 4593 or 4386 — to — 丙申年 (Fire Monkey); 4594 or 4387
- Coptic calendar: 1612–1613
- Discordian calendar: 3062
- Ethiopian calendar: 1888–1889
- Hebrew calendar: 5656–5657
- Hindu calendars
- Vikram Samvat: 1952–1953
- Shaka Samvat: 1817–1818
- Kali Yuga: 4996–4997
- Holocene calendar: 11896
- Igbo calendar: 896–897
- Iranian calendar: 1274–1275
- Islamic calendar: 1313–1314
- Japanese calendar: Meiji 29 (明治２９年)
- Javanese calendar: 1825–1826
- Julian calendar: Gregorian minus 12 days
- Korean calendar: 4229
- Minguo calendar: 16 before ROC 民前16年
- Nanakshahi calendar: 428
- Thai solar calendar: 2438–2439
- Tibetan calendar: ཤིང་མོ་ལུག་ལོ་ (female Wood-Sheep); 2022 or 1641 or 869 — to — མེ་ཕོ་སྤྲེ་ལོ་ (male Fire-Monkey); 2023 or 1642 or 870

1896 (MDCCCXCVI) was a leap year starting on Wednesday of the Gregorian calendar and a leap year starting on Monday of the Julian calendar, the 1896th year of the Common Era (CE) and Anno Domini (AD) designations, the 896th year of the 2nd millennium, the 96th year of the 19th century, and the 7th year of the 1890s decade. As of the start of 1896, the Gregorian calendar was 12 days ahead of the Julian calendar, which remained in localized use until 1923.

== Events ==
=== January ===
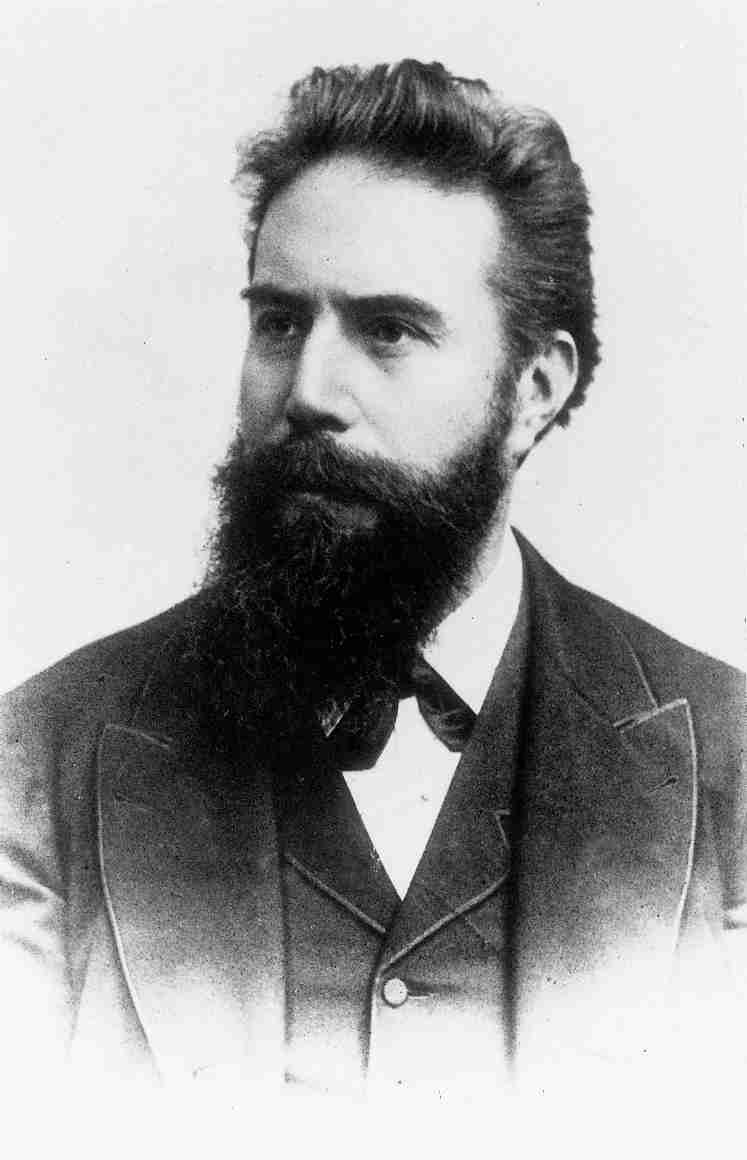
January 5: Röntgen rays.

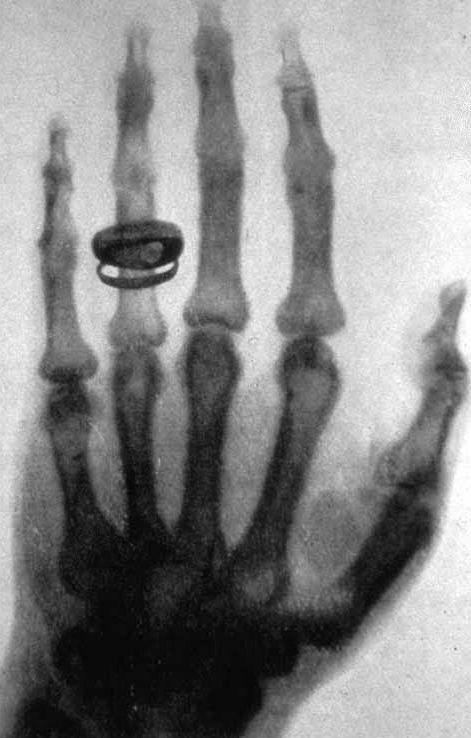
January 5: Röntgen X-ray.

- January 2 – The Jameson Raid comes to an end as Jameson surrenders to the Boers.
- January 4 – Utah is admitted as the 45th U.S. state.
- January 5 – An Austrian newspaper reports Wilhelm Röntgen's discovery, last November, of a type of electromagnetic radiation, later known as X-rays.
- January 6 – Cecil Rhodes is forced to resign as Prime Minister of the Cape of Good Hope for his involvement in the Jameson Raid.
- January 7 – American culinary expert Fannie Farmer publishes her first cookbook.
- January 12 – H. L. Smith takes the first X-ray photograph.
- January 16 – Devonport High School for Boys is founded in Plymouth (England).
- January 17 – Fourth Anglo-Ashanti War: British redcoats enter the Ashanti capital, Kumasi, and Asantehene Agyeman Prempeh I is deposed.
- January 28 – Walter Arnold, of East Peckham, Kent, England, is fined 1 shilling for speeding at 8 mph (13 km/h), exceeding the contemporary urban speed limit of 2 mph (3.2 km/h), the first speeding fine.

=== February ===
- February 1 – Giacomo Puccini's opera La bohème premieres in Turin, Italy.
- February 11 – Oscar Wilde's play Salomé (1891) has its stage premiere (while Wilde is in prison) in its original French in Paris.
- February 19 – Braamfontein Explosion: A train carrying 56 tons of dynamite explodes at Braamfontein, Johannesburg, killing more than 78 people.

=== March ===
- March 1 – Battle of Adwa: Ethiopia defends its independence from Italy, ending the First Italo-Ethiopian War.
- March 3 – Publication begins for Der Eigene, the world's first magazine with an orientation to male homosexuality, by Adolf Brand in Berlin.
- March 9 – Responding to national outrage at the defeat at Adwa, Italian Prime Minister Francesco Crispi resigns.
- March 19 – Dvořák's Cello Concerto premieres, in London.
- March 29 – The Royal College of St Patrick, Maynooth in Ireland is granted the status of pontifical university by charter of the Holy See.

=== April ===
- April 4 – The first known women's basketball game between two colleges is played between Stanford and California.

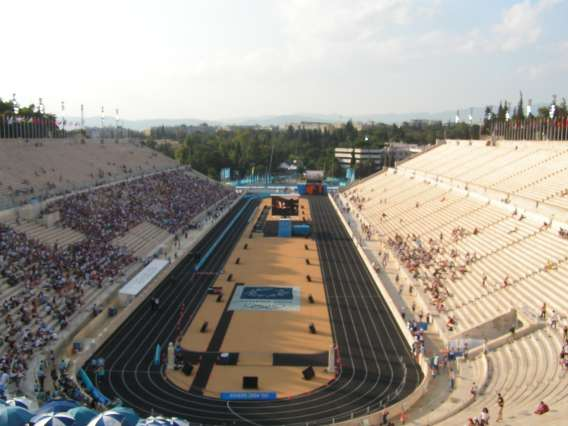
A picture of the restored Panathenaic Stadium, the site of the 1896 Summer Olympics

- April 6 – The opening ceremonies of the 1896 Summer Olympics, the first modern Olympic Games, are held in Athens, Greece.
- April 9 – The National Farm School (later Delaware Valley College) is chartered in Doylestown, Pennsylvania.
- April 23 – Blackpool Pleasure Beach, a popular English theme park ("Britain's Biggest Tourist Attraction"), is founded by Alderman William George Bean.
- April – Svante Arrhenius first publishes the "greenhouse law", becoming the first person to predict that emissions of carbon dioxide from the burning of fossil fuels and other combustion processes are large enough to cause global warming through the greenhouse effect.

=== May ===
- May 8 – Cricket: Against Warwickshire, Yorkshire sets a still-standing County Championship record in England, when they accumulate an innings total of 887.
- May 13 – The Franchise Bill is passed by the Colony of Natal's Legislative Assembly, disfranchising natives of other countries.
- May 18 – Plessy v. Ferguson: The U.S. Supreme Court introduces the separate but equal doctrine, and upholds racial segregation.
- May 26
  - Coronation of Nicholas II and Alexandra Feodorovna in the Dormition Cathedral, Moscow; this will be the last coronation of the Russian monarch. The Qing dynasty is represented at the coronation by Chinese official Li Hongzhang who through September goes on to visit Germany, Britain, Canada and the United States.
  - Eleven years after its foundation, a group of 12 purely industrial stocks are chosen to form the Dow Jones Industrial Average in the U.S. The index is composed entirely of industrial shares for the first time.
- May 27 – St. Louis–East St. Louis tornado: The costliest and third deadliest tornado in U.S. history levels a mile wide swath of downtown St. Louis, Missouri, incurring US$2.9 billion (1997 USD) in normalized damages, killing more than 255 and injuring over 1,000 people.
- May 30 – Khodynka Tragedy: a crowd crush at Khodynka Field in Moscow kills at least 1,200 of those marking the coronation year of Emperor Nicholas II of Russia.

=== June ===
- June 4 – The Ford Quadricycle, the first vehicle developed by Henry Ford, is completed, eventually leading Ford to build the empire that "put America on wheels".
- June 7 – Mahdist War: Battle of Ferkeh – British and Egyptian troops are victorious.
- June 12 – J. T. Hearne sets a record for the earliest date of taking 100 wickets in cricket, in England (it is equalled by Charlie Parker in 1931).
- June 15 – The 8.5 M_{w} Sanriku earthquake and tsunami kills 22,000 in northeastern Japan.
- June 18 – The New York Telephone Company is formed, succeeding the Metropolitan Telephone and Telegraph Company, to control telephone service within New York City.
- June 23 – Liberal leader Wilfrid Laurier defeats Charles Tupper during Canadian federal elections for the 8th Canadian Parliament, to become the first Francophone Prime Minister of Canada.
- June 28 – Twin Shaft disaster: An explosion in the Newton Coal Company's Twin Shaft Mine in Pittston, Pennsylvania results in a massive cave-in that kills 58 miners.

=== July ===
- July 9 – William Jennings Bryan delivers his Cross of Gold speech at the Democratic National Convention, which nominates him for president of the United States.
- July 11 – Wilfrid Laurier becomes Canada's seventh prime minister, and the first French-speaker to hold that office.
- July 21 – In Washington, D.C., in response to a "call to confer" issued by Josephine St. Pierre Ruffin to all women of color, the National Association of Colored Women's Clubs is organized.
- July 26 – The International Socialist Workers and Trade Union Congress opens in London.
- July 27 – A causeway is opened between the islands of Saaremaa and Muhu in Estonia.
- July 30 – Atlantic City rail crash: Shortly after 6:30 pm, at a crossing just west of Atlantic City, New Jersey, two trains collide, crushing five loaded passenger coaches, killing 50 and seriously injuring approximately sixty.

=== August ===
- August 1 – The Park Seung-jik shop, predecessor of South Korean conglomerate Doosan Group, is founded in Joseon (the kingdom of Korea).
- August 14 – The Uganda Railway Act, 1896, is approved in the United Kingdom, for construction of a railway in Africa from Mombasa to Lake Victoria.
- August 16 – Keish (often called Skookum Jim Mason), George Carmack, and Dawson Charlie discover gold in the Klondike, Yukon.
- August 17 – Bridget Driscoll is run over by a Benz car on the grounds of The Crystal Palace, London, the world's first motoring fatality.
- August 23 – The Cry of Pugad Lawin initiates the Philippine Revolution.
- August 27
  - The shortest war in recorded history, the Anglo-Zanzibar War, starts at 9:00 in the morning, and lasts for 45 minutes of shelling.
  - Britain establishes a Protectorate over the Ashanti people concluding the Fourth Anglo-Ashanti War.
- August – The 1896 Eastern North America heat wave kills 1,500 people from Chicago, Illinois to Boston, Massachusetts.

=== September ===
- September 2 – Clarkson University holds its first classes, with 17 students attending in Potsdam, New York.
- September 15 – The Crash at Crush train wreck stunt is held in Texas.
- September 22 – Queen Victoria surpasses her grandfather King George III as the longest-reigning monarch in British history up to this time.
- September 28 – Pathé Frères, a French film company and one of the oldest film companies, is founded by the brothers Charles Pathé, Théophile Pathé, Émile Pathé and Jacques Pathé.
- September 30 – Italy and France sign a treaty whereby Italy virtually recognizes Tunisia as a French dependency.

=== October ===
- October 1 – Gottlieb Daimler builds the first gasoline truck.
- October 4 – A locomotive in Bulawayo explodes and kills ten prisoners.
- October 2 – The Victorian Football League is established as Australian rules football in Australia (a predecessor of the Australian Football League).
- October 30 – The Augusta High School cornerstone is laid in Augusta, Kentucky, marking the end of the Augusta Methodist College.

=== November ===
- November 3 – 1896 United States presidential election: Republican William McKinley defeats William Jennings Bryan. The event is viewed by some as a political realignment for the United States Republican Party.
- November 21 - The Hamburg dockworkers' strike of 1896-97 is considered one of the largest labour disputes in the German Empire.
- November 27 – Richard Strauss's orchestral tone poem Also sprach Zarathustra is first performed, in Frankfurt, conducted by the composer.
- November 30
  - Udinese Calcio Association football club is founded in Udine, Italy.
  - "St. Augustine Monster": A large carcass, later postulated to be the remains of a gigantic octopus, is found washed ashore near St. Augustine, Florida.

=== December ===
- December 1 – Archaeologist Alois Anton Führer, Nepalese General Khadga Samsher Rana and an expedition rediscover the great stone pillar of Ashoka at Lumbini, traditionally the spot of the birthplace of Gautama Buddha, after using Faxian's records.
- December 10
  - The New York Aquarium opens.
  - The premiere of Alfred Jarry's absurdist play Ubu Roi in Paris causes a near-riot.
- December 14 – The Glasgow Subway, the third-oldest underground metro system in the world, opens.
- December 25 – John Philip Sousa composes The Stars and Stripes Forever which will become the national march of the United States.
- December 30 – José Rizal, Filipino scholar and poet, is executed by Spanish authorities in the Philippines.

=== Date unknown ===
Visual tour of Italy: Milan, Venice and visit with Pope Leo XIII, Summer, 1896

- France establishes an administrative post in Abengourou, Ivory Coast.
- A school of mines opens in Kimberley and will form the core of the University of the Witwatersrand.
- The pharmaceutical and healthcare company Hoffmann-La Roche in Switzerland comes wholly under the control of Fritz Hoffmann-La Roche.
- Racing Club de Lyon, a football club in France, is officially founded and becomes a predecessor of Olympique Lyonnais.
- Pope Leo XIII is filmed, making him the first ever Pope to be filmed and the earliest-born person to be captured on film. (Note: to view the event in the video above, go to timestamp 3:07)

== Births ==
=== January–February ===
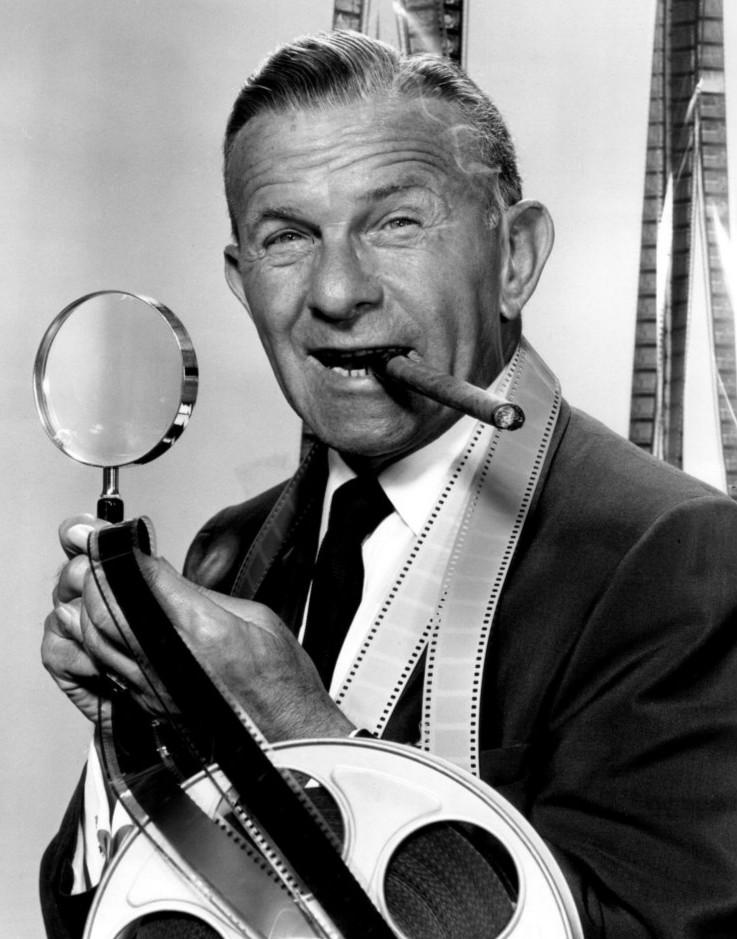
George Burns

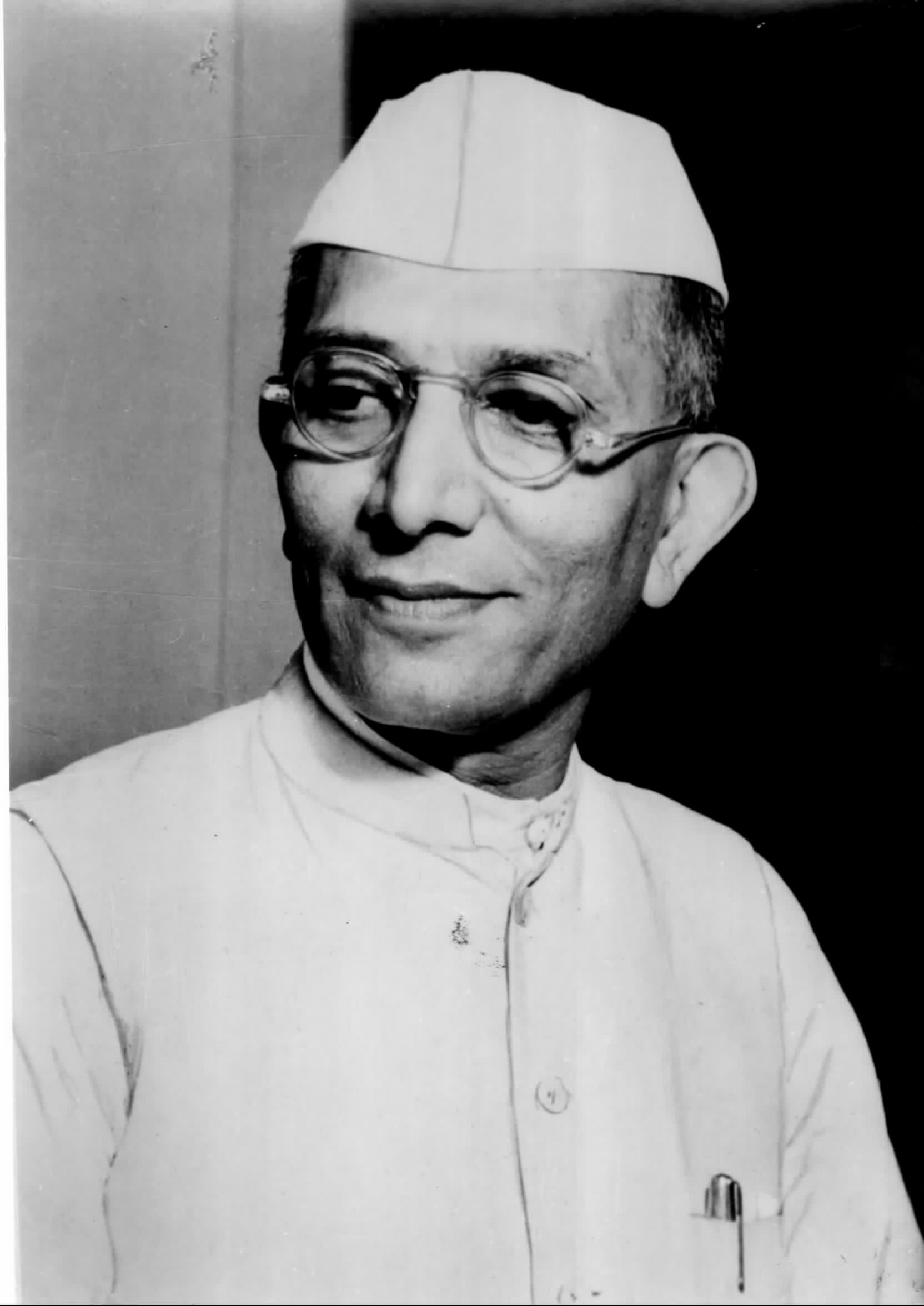
Morarji Desai

- January 2 – Dziga Vertov, Russian filmmaker (d. 1954)
- January 4
  - Everett Dirksen, American politician (d. 1969)
  - André Masson, French artist (d. 1987)
- January 8
  - Arthur Ford, American psychic spiritual medium, clairaudient (d. 1971)
  - Clifton Sprague, American admiral (d. 1955)
- January 12 – Uberto De Morpurgo, Italian tennis player (d. 1961)
- January 14 – John Dos Passos, American author (d. 1970)
- January 20 – George Burns, American actor, comedian (d. 1996)
- January 21 – J. Carrol Naish, American character actor (d. 1973)
- January 23 – Charlotte, Grand Duchess of Luxembourg (d. 1985)
- January 26 – József Kiss, Austro-Hungarian fighter pilot (d. 1918)
- February 1 – Anastasio Somoza García, 21st President of Nicaragua (d. 1956)
- February 2 – Ramón Franco, Spanish aviation pioneer (d. 1938)
- February 4 – Friedrich Hund, German physicist (d. 1997)
- February 11 – Claire Myers Owens, American author (d. 1983)
- February 18 – Li Linsi, Chinese educator and diplomat (d. 1970)
- February 19 – André Breton, French writer (d. 1966)
- February 25 – Heinrich Gontermann, German World War I fighter ace (d. 1917)
- February 28 – Philip Showalter Hench, American physician, recipient of the Nobel Prize in Physiology or Medicine (d. 1965)
- February 29
  - Morarji Desai, 4th Prime Minister of India (d. 1995)
  - William A. Wellman, American motion picture director (d. 1975)

=== March–April ===
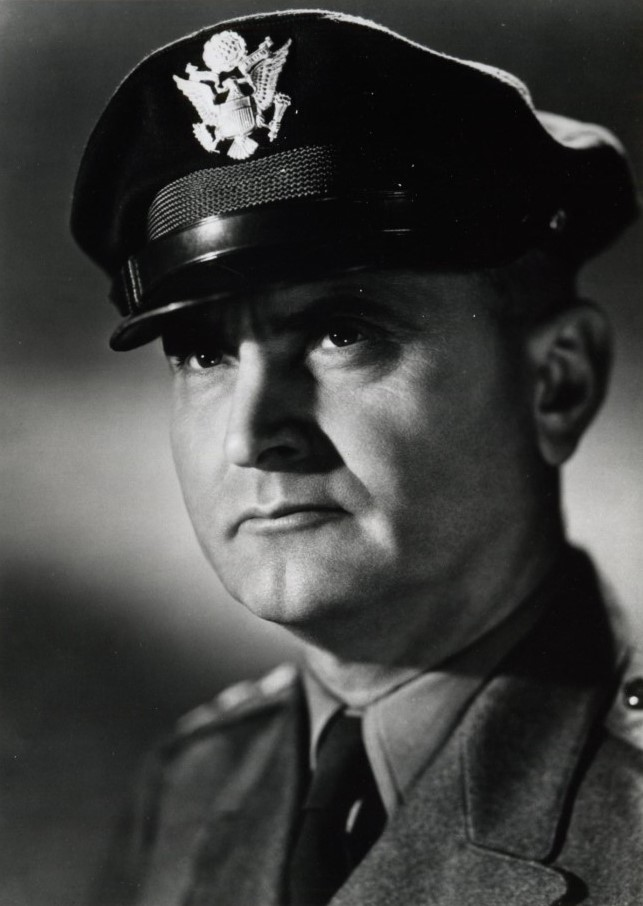
Ira C. Eaker

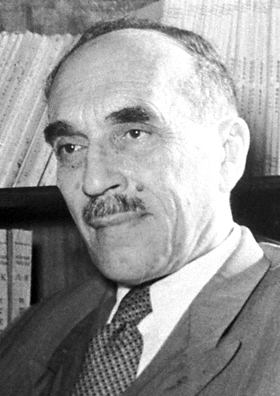
Nikolay Semyonov

- March 1 – Dimitri Mitropoulos, Greek conductor, pianist and composer (d. 1960)
- March 13 – Field Eugene Kindley, American World War I fighter pilot (d. 1920)
- March 20 – Wop May, Canadian World War I pilot (d. 1952)
- March 22 – Joseph Schildkraut, Austrian-American actor (d. 1964)
- March 29 – Wilhelm Ackermann, German mathematician (d. 1962)
- April 13 – Ira C. Eaker, World War II United States Army Air Forces general (d. 1987)
- April 15
  - Gerhard Fieseler, German World War I flying ace, aerobatics champion, aircraft designer and manufacturer (d. 1987)
  - Nikolay Semyonov, Russian chemist, Nobel Prize laureate (d. 1986)
- April 17 – Señor Wences, Spanish ventriloquist (d. 1999)
- April 21 – Geertruida Wijsmuller-Meijer, Dutch war hero, resistance fighter and humanitarian (d. 1978)
- April 26
  - Sébastienne Guyot, French aerodynamics engineer and Olympic athlete (d. 1941)
  - Ernst Udet, German World War I fighter ace, Nazi Luftwaffe official (d. 1941)
- April 27 – Rogers Hornsby, American baseball player (d. 1963)
- April 30 – Reverend Gary Davis, American musician (d. 1972)

=== May–June ===
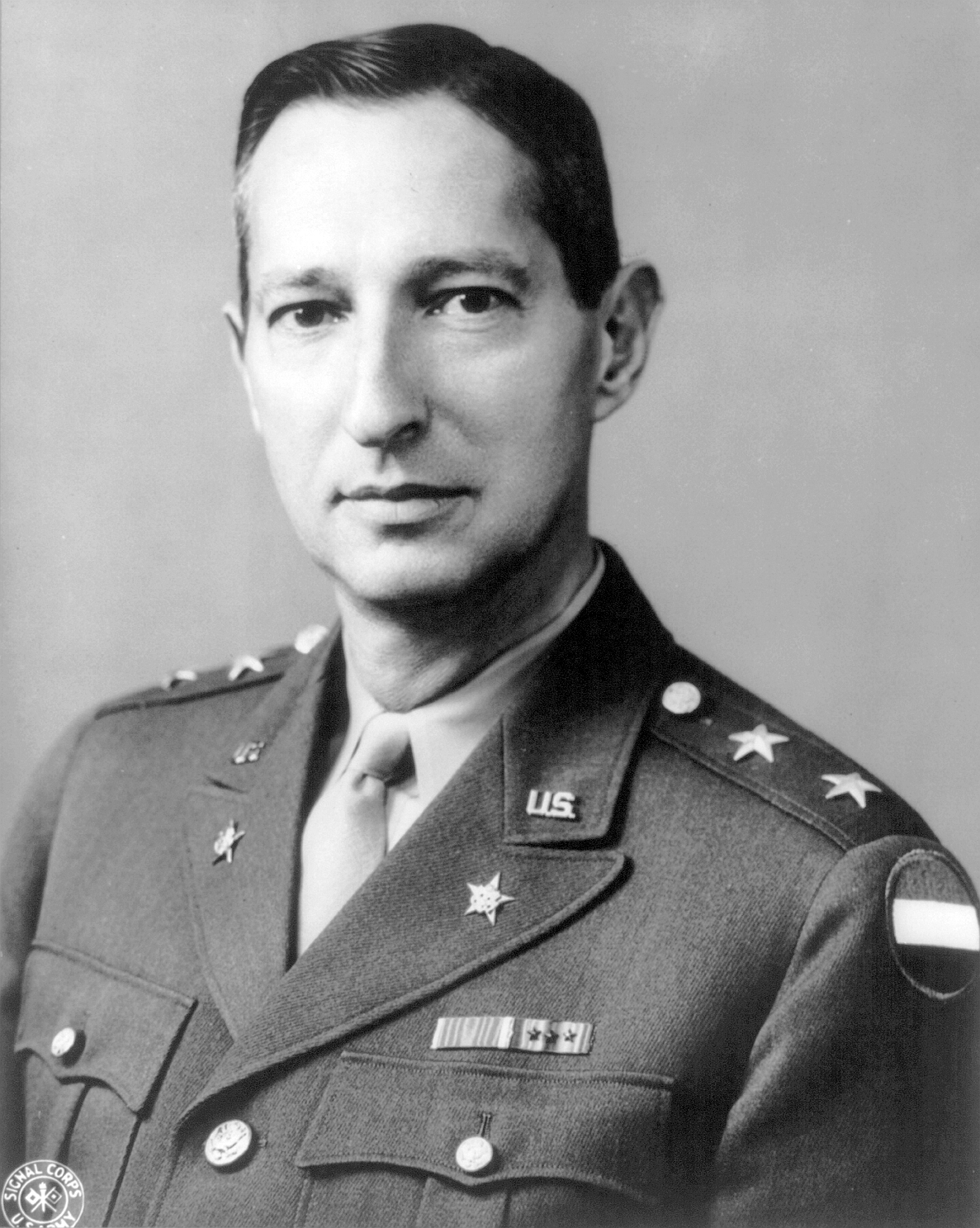
Mark W. Clark

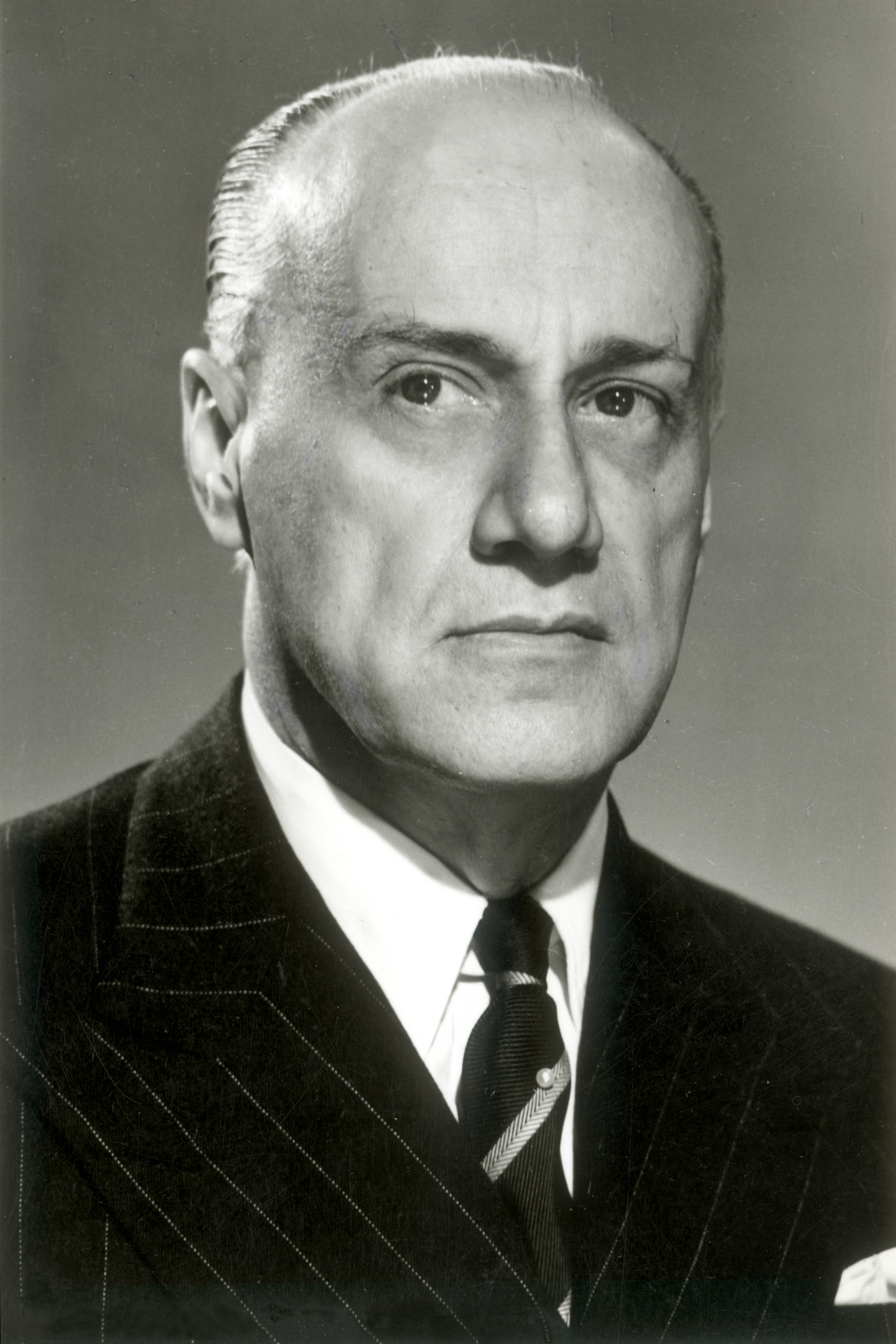
Jorge Alessandri

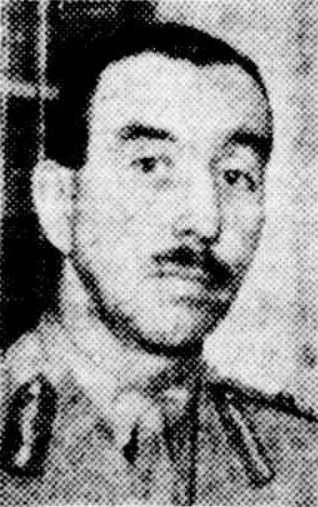
Walter Cawthorn

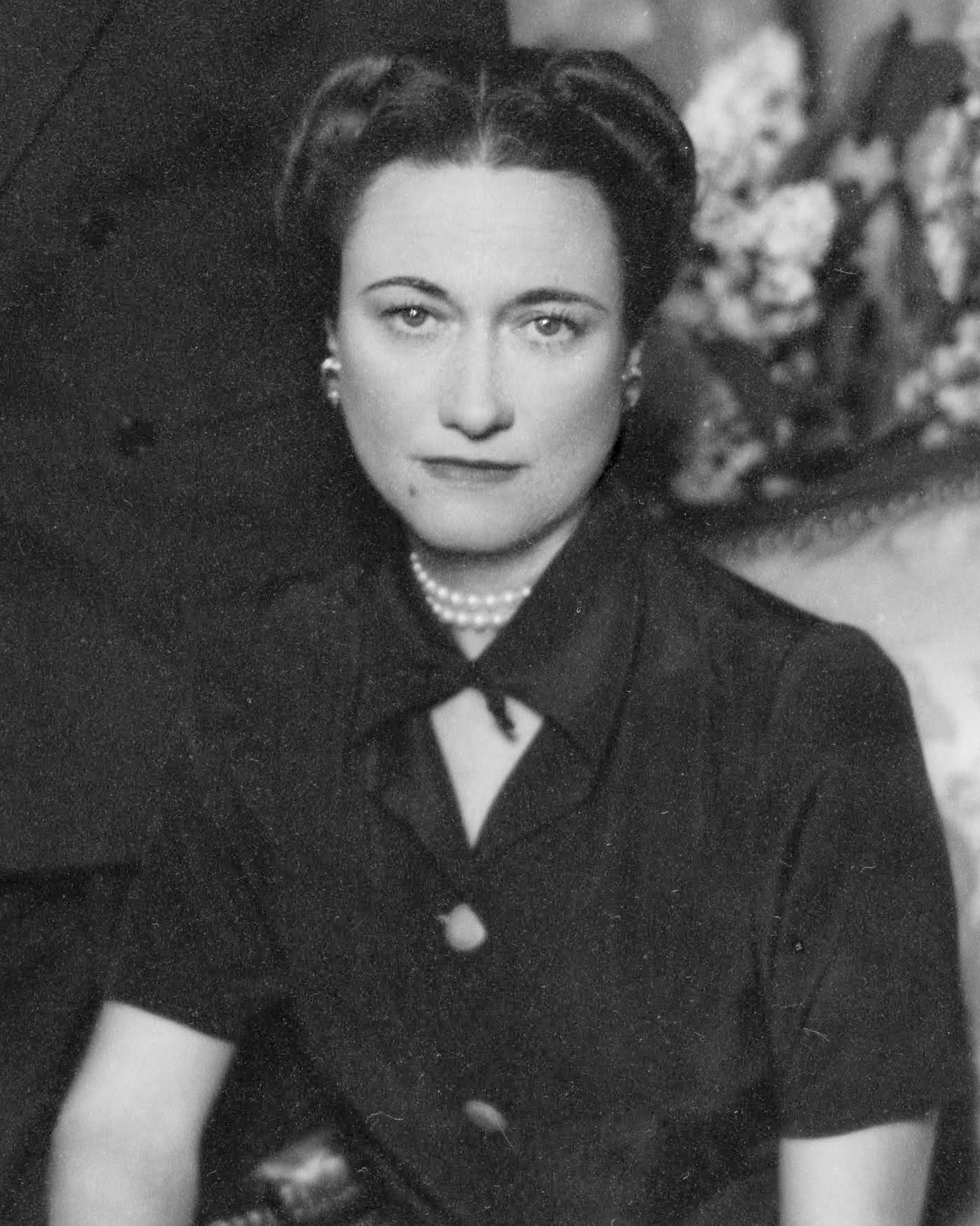
Wallis Simpson

- May 1
  - Mark W. Clark, American general (d. 1984)
  - J. Lawton Collins, American general (d. 1987)
- May 2 – Helen of Greece and Denmark, Queen Mother of Romania (d. 1982)
- May 3 – Karl Allmenröder, German World War I fighter pilot (d. 1917)
- May 5 – Kaju Sugiura, Japanese admiral (d. 1945)
- May 19 – Jorge Alessandri, 27th President of Chile (d. 1986)
- May 23 – Andor Jaross, ethnic Hungarian politician (d. 1946)
- May 29 – Luther W. Youngdahl, American politician, Governor of Minnesota from 1947 to 1951, and a United States district judge from 1951 to 1978 (d. 1978)
- May 30 – Howard Hawks, American director (d. 1977)
- May 31 – Ernest Haller, American cinematographer (d. 1974)
- June 1 – Sydney Kyte, British bandleader (d. 1981)
- June 2 – Nubar Gulbenkian, Ottoman-born Armenian-British oil trader, socialite and intelligence operative (d. 1972)
- June 4 - Anne-Marcelle Kahn, née Schrameck, first French woman engineer to graduate from l'École nationale supérieure des mines de Saint-Étienne (d. 1965)
- June 6
  - Henry Allingham, British World War I veteran, world's oldest man (d. 2009)
  - Italo Balbo, Italian Fascist leader, aviator (d. 1940)
- June 7
  - Robert S. Mulliken, American chemist, Nobel Prize laureate (d. 1986)
  - Imre Nagy, 3-time prime minister of Hungary (d. 1958)
- June 11 – Walter Cawthorn, Australian spymaster (d. 1970)
- June 19 – Wallis Simpson, American-born Duchess of Windsor (d. 1986)
- June 23 – Francisco Malabo Beosá, Equatoguinean royalty (d. 2001)
- June 29 – Boris Podolsky, Russian-American physicist (d. 1966)

=== July–August ===
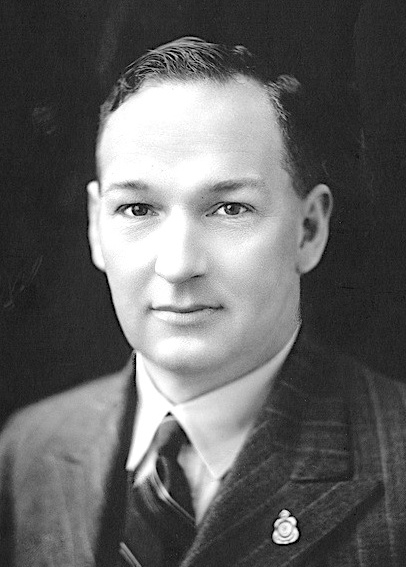
Thomas Playford IV

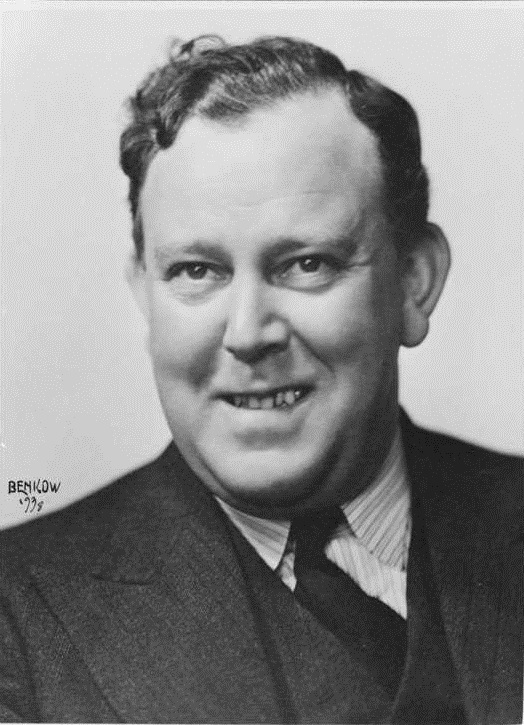
Trygve Lie

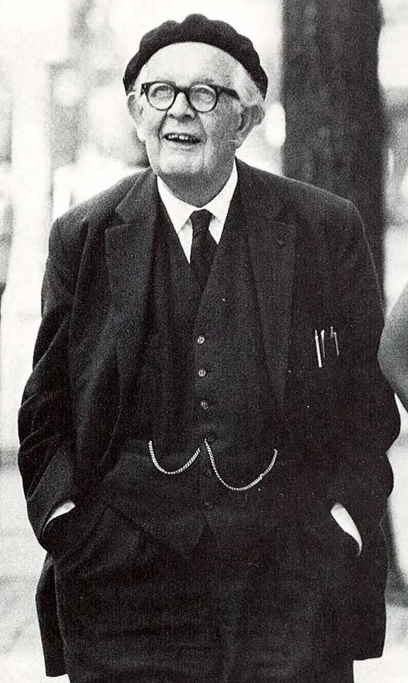
Jean Piaget

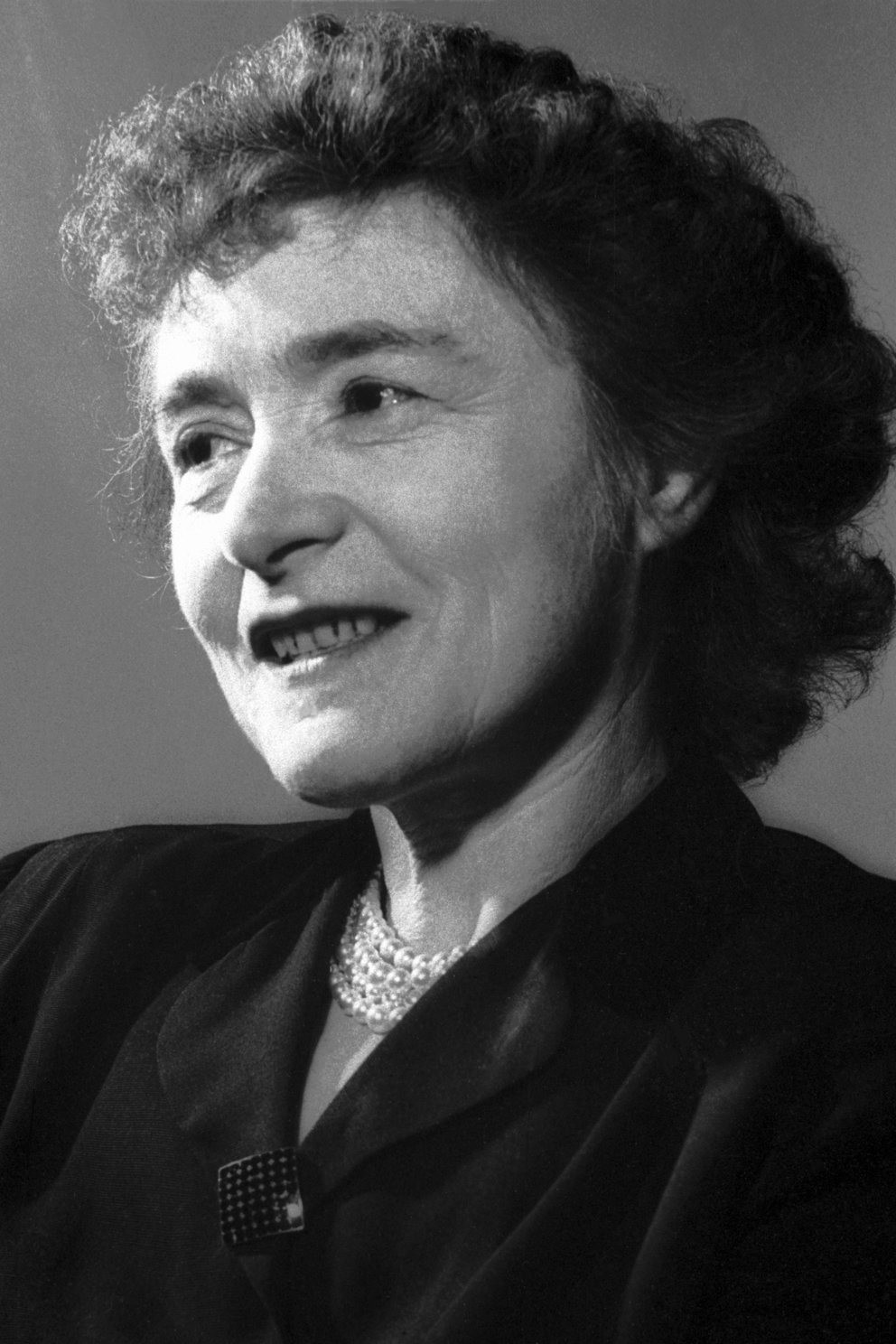
Gerty Cori

- July 2 – Quirino Cristiani, Argentine animated film director (d. 1984)
- July 4 – Mao Dun, Chinese novelist, cultural critic, and Minister of Culture (d. 1981)
- July 5 – Thomas Playford IV, South Australian politician (d. 1981)
- July 16
  - Gertrude Welcker, German actress (d. 1988)
  - Trygve Lie, Norwegian politician, 1st United Nations Secretary General (d. 1968)
- July 17 – Dumitru Dămăceanu, Romanian general and politician (d. 1978)
- July 18 – Patrick O'Boyle, American Roman Catholic prelate (d. 1987)
- July 19 – Stafford L. Warren, American physician and radiologist; inventor of the mammogram (d. 1981)
- July 28 – Barbara La Marr, American silent actress (d. 1926)
- August 7 – Ernesto Lecuona, Cuban pianist, composer (d. 1963)
- August 8 – Sivananda, Indian yoga teacher (unverified self-claimed date) (d. 2025)
- August 9
  - Erich Hückel, German physicist, physical chemist (d. 1980)
  - Léonide Massine, Russian ballet dancer, choreographer (d. 1979)
  - Jean Piaget, Swiss psychologist (d. 1980)
- August 10 – Walter Lang, American film director (d. 1972)
- August 13 – Rudolf Schmundt, German general (d. 1944)
- August 14 – Albert Ball, British World War I fighter ace, Victoria Cross recipient (d. 1917)
- August 15 – Gerty Cori, Austrian-born biochemist, recipient of the Nobel Prize in Physiology or Medicine (d. 1957)
- August 17 – Leslie Groves, United States Army general, director of the Manhattan Project (d. 1970)
- August 18 – Jack Pickford, Canadian-born American actor, film director, and producer (d. 1933)
- August 27 – Léon Theremin, Russian inventor (d. 1993)
- August 28 – Arthur Calwell, Australian politician (d. 1973)
- August 30 – Raymond Massey, Canadian-born American actor (d. 1983)

=== September–October ===
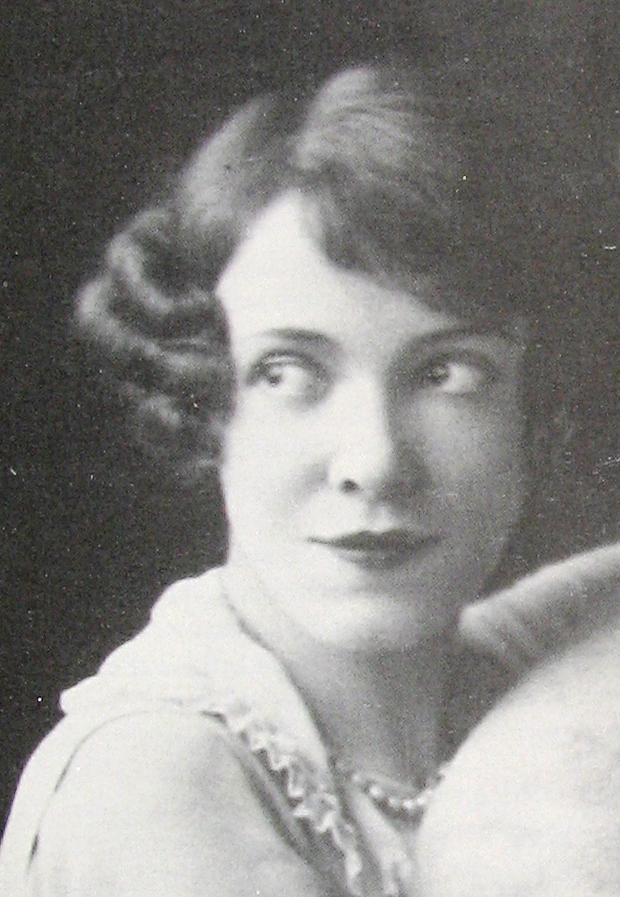
Adele Astaire

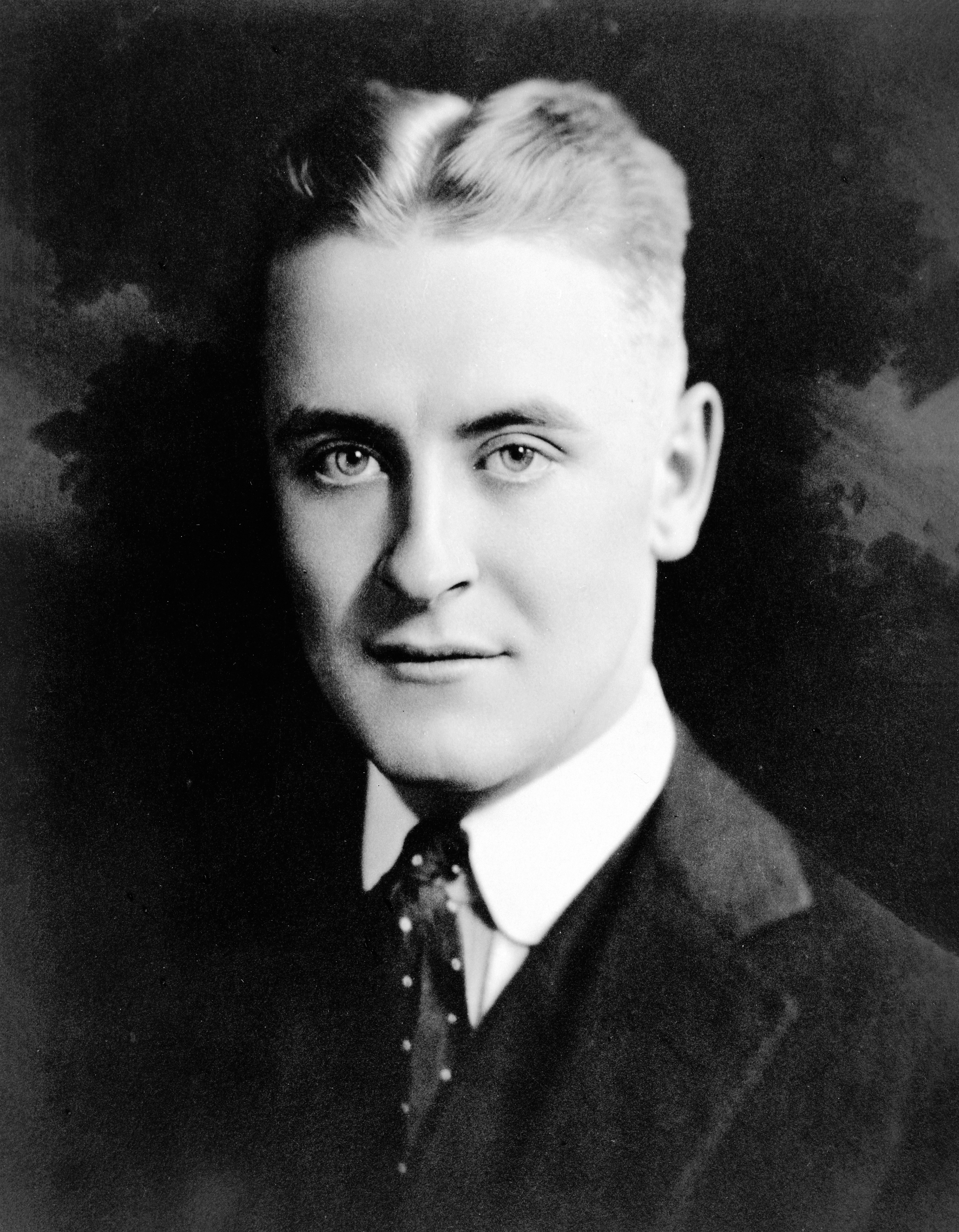
F. Scott Fitzgerald

- September 1 – A. C. Bhaktivedanta Swami Prabhupada, Indian religious leader, founder-acharya of the International Society for Krishna Consciousness (d. 1977)
- September 4 – Antonin Artaud, French stage actor, director (d. 1948)
- September 10 – Adele Astaire, American dancer (d. 1981)
- September 14 – José Mojica, Mexican Franciscan friar, tenor and film actor (d. 1974)
- September 21 – Walter Breuning, American supercentenarian, sixth-oldest verified man in history (d. 2011)
- September 22 – Uri Zvi Greenberg, Israeli poet and journalist (d. 1981)
- September 24 – F. Scott Fitzgerald, American writer (d. 1940)
- September 25 – Sandro Pertini, President of Italy (d. 1990)
- September 30 – Jolie Gabor, Hungarian-American entrepreneur, jeweler and memoirist (d. 1997)
- October 1 – Abraham Sofaer, Burmese-born British actor (d. 1988)
- October 7 – Paulino Alcántara, Filipino-Spanish soccer player (d. 1964)
- October 12 – Eugenio Montale, Italian writer, Nobel Prize laureate (d. 1981)
- October 14 – Bud Flanagan, British entertainer, comedian (d. 1968)
- October 22 – Earle Clements, American politician, governor of Kentucky (d. 1985)
- October 28 – Howard Hanson, American composer (d. 1981)
- October 30 – Ruth Gordon, American actress, screenwriter, and playwright (d. 1985)
- October 31 – Ethel Waters, American singer, actress (d. 1977)

=== November–December ===
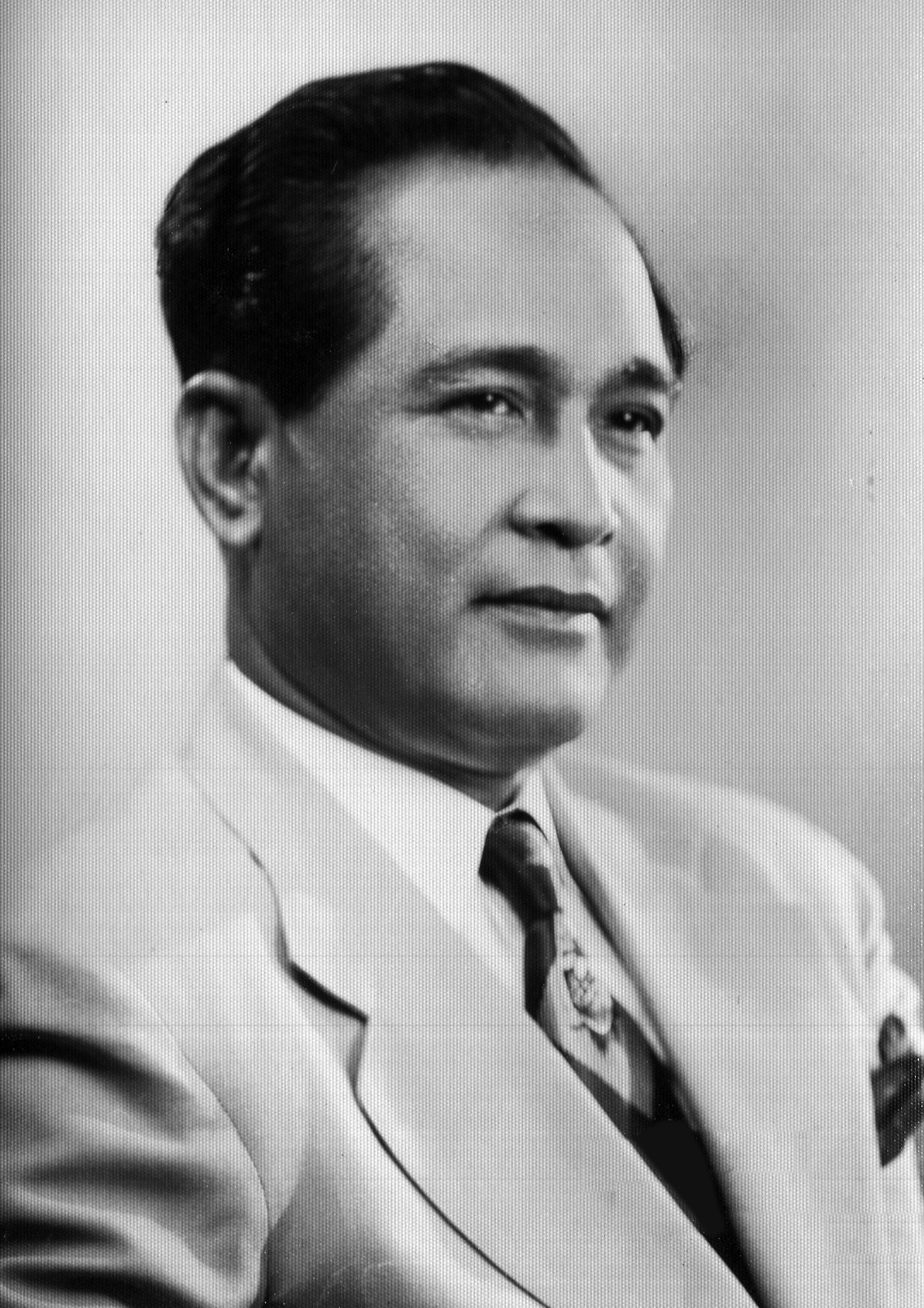
Carlos P. Garcia

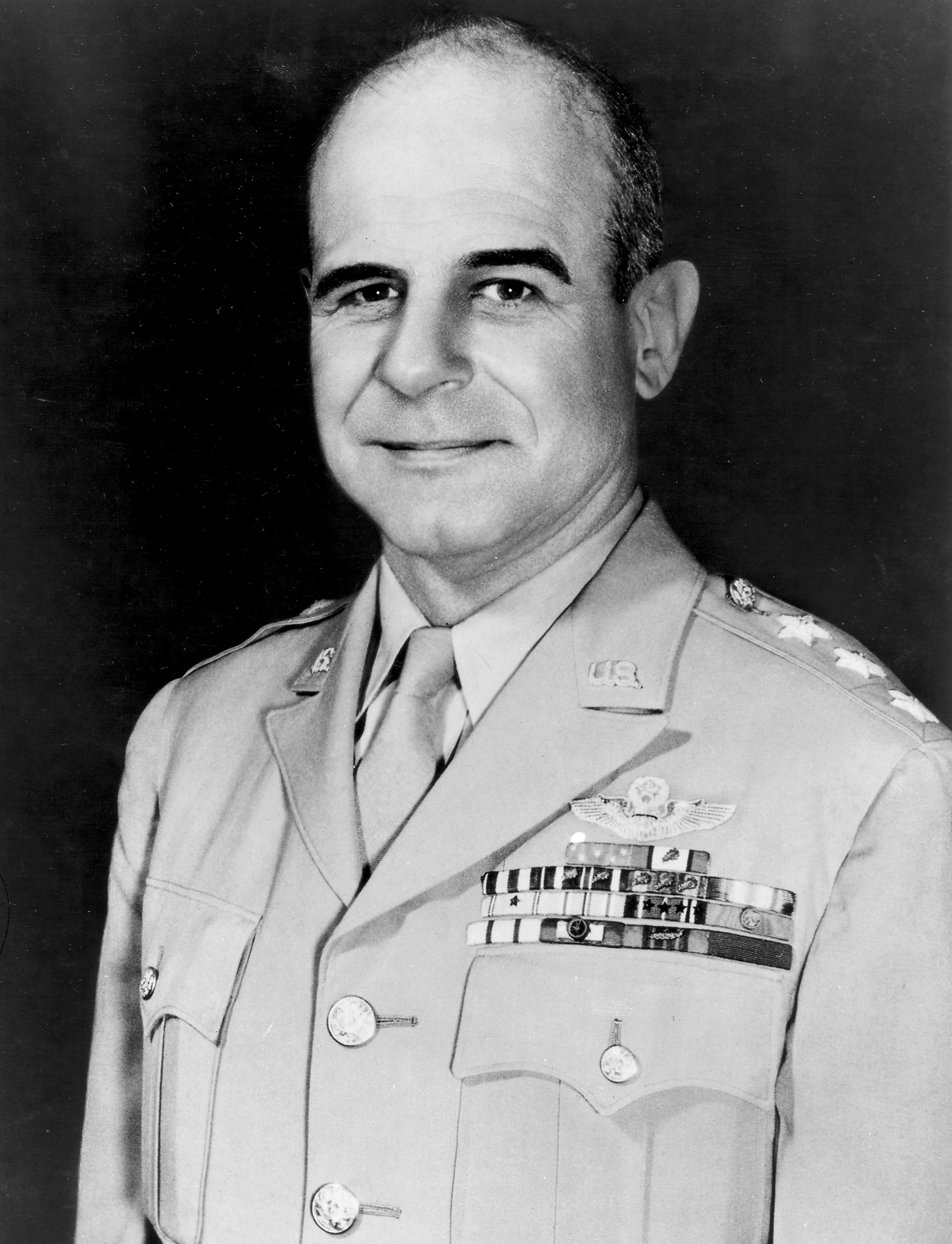
Jimmy Doolittle

- November 4
  - Carlos P. Garcia, 8th President of the Philippines (d. 1971)
  - Ian Wolfe, American actor (d. 1992)
- November 8 – Marie Prevost, Canadian-born American actress (d. 1937)
- November 10
  - Jimmy Dykes, American baseball player, manager (d. 1976)
  - Mary, Lady Heath, Irish aviator (d. 1939)
- November 13 – Nobusuke Kishi, Prime Minister of Japan (d. 1987)
- November 14 – Mamie Eisenhower, First Lady of the United States (d. 1979)
- November 15 – Giovanni Ancillotto, Italian World War I flying ace (d. 1924)
- November 16
  - Oswald Mosley, leader of the British Union of Fascists (d. 1980)
  - Lawrence Tibbett, American opera singer, actor (d. 1960)
- November 17 – Lev Vygotsky, Russian psychologist (d. 1934)
- November 23 – Klement Gottwald, Czechoslovak communist politician (d. 1953)
- November 25
  - Virgil Thomson, American composer, critic (d. 1989)
  - Jessie Royce Landis, American actress (d. 1972)
  - Priscilla Dean, American actress (d. 1987)
  - Albertus Soegijapranata, Indonesian Jesuit priest (d. 1963)
- November 26 – Manuel A. Odría, 79th President of Peru (d. 1974)
- November 28 – Lilia Skala, Austrian-American actress (d. 1994)
- December 1 – Georgi Zhukov, Soviet military leader, Marshal of the Soviet Union (d. 1974)
- December 2 – Alfons Tracki, German-Albanian priest (martyred 1946)
- December 5 – Carl Ferdinand Cori, Austrian-born biochemist, recipient of the Nobel Prize in Physiology or Medicine (d. 1984)
- December 6
  - Ira Gershwin, American lyricist (d. 1983)
  - Hermannus Reydon, Dutch journalist and Nazi collaborator (d. 1943)
- December 12 – Vasily Gordov, Soviet general (d. 1950)
- December 14 – Jimmy Doolittle, American aviation pioneer, World War II United States Army Air Forces general (d. 1993)
- December 15 – Miles Dempsey, British general (d. 1969)
- December 16 – Anna Anderson, pretender to the Russian throne (d. 1984)
- December 23 – Giuseppe Tomasi di Lampedusa, Italian writer (d. 1957)
- December 27 –
  - Louis Bromfield, American writer (d. 1956)
  - Carl Zuckmayer, German writer, playwright (d. 1977)
- December 28 – Roger Sessions, American composer (d. 1985)
- December 29 – David Alfaro Siqueiros, Mexican muralist (d. 1974)

== Deaths ==
=== January–March ===
- January 4 – Joseph Hubert Reinkens, German Old Catholic bishop (b. 1821)
- January 5 – Charlie Bassett, American sheriff (b. 1847)
- January 8 – Paul Verlaine, French lyric poet (b. 1844)
- January 15 – Mathew Brady, American photographer (b. 1822)
- January 18 – Charles Floquet, Prime Minister of France (b. 1828)
- January 20 – Prince Henry of Battenberg, Lombardy-born British royal, married to Princess Beatrice of the United Kingdom (b. 1858)
- January 26 – James Edwin Campbell, American educator, school administrator, newspaper editor, poet, and essayist (b. 1867)
- February 7 – William Hayden English, American politician (b. 1822)
- February 25 – Joseph P. Fyffe, American admiral (b. 1832)
- March 12 – Carlo Alberto Racchia, Italian admiral and politician (b. 1833)
- March 30 – Charilaos Trikoupis, 7-time prime minister of Greece (b. 1832)

=== April–June ===
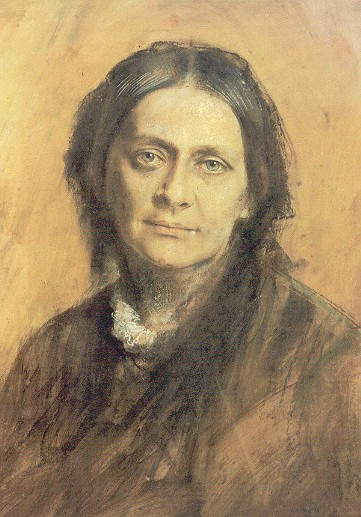
Clara Schumann

- April 9 – Gustav Koerner, German-American statesman (b. 1809)
- April 27 – Sir Henry Parkes, Australian politician, Premier of New South Wales (b. 1815)
- April 30 – Hamilton Disston, American industrialist and land developer (b. 1844)
- May 1 – Naser al-Din Shah Qajar, Shah of Persia, King of Herat (b. 1831)
- May 7 – H. H. Holmes, American serial killer (executed) (b. 1861)
- May 10 – Antti Ahlström, Finnish industrialist, founder of Ahlstrom (b. 1827)
- May 13 – Nora Perry, American newspaper correspondent (b. 1831)
- May 17 – Muhammad Al-Sabah, emir of Kuwait (b. 1831)
- May 18 – Daniel Pollen, 9th Prime Minister of New Zealand (b. 1813)
- May 19 – Archduke Karl Ludwig of Austria, father of Archduke Ferdinand (b. 1833)
- May 20 – Clara Schumann, German composer, pianist (b. 1819)
- May 24 – Luigi Federico Menabrea, Italian soldier, statesman (b. 1809)
- May 25 – Franz Kuhn von Kuhnenfeld, Austrian general and politician (b. 1817)
- June 13 – Alpheus Felch, American politician, governor and senator from Michigan (b. 1804)
- June 19 – Louis Brière de l'Isle, French general (b. 1827)

=== July–September ===
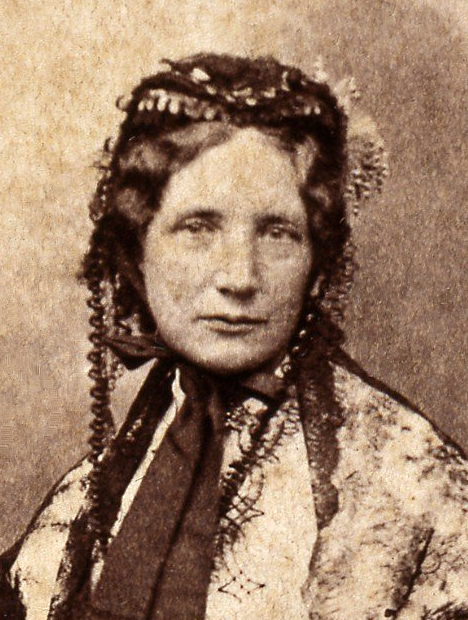
Harriet Beecher Stowe

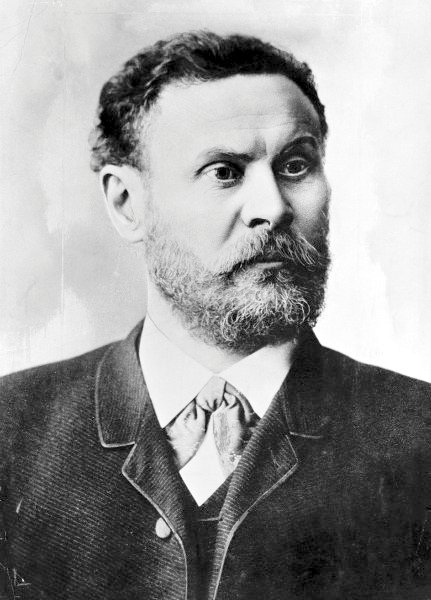
Otto Lilienthal

- July 1 – Harriet Beecher Stowe, American author (b. 1811)
- July 4 – Marcelo H. del Pilar, Filipino writer, journalist (b. 1850)
- July 11 – Ernst Curtius, German historian (b. 1814)
- July 13 – August Kekulé, German chemist (b. 1829)
- July 16 – Edmond de Goncourt, French writer, co-founder of the Académie Goncourt (b. 1822)
- July 19 – Abraham H. Cannon, American Mormon apostle (b. 1859)
- August 10 – Otto Lilienthal, German aviation pioneer (b. 1848)
- August 12 – Sir Harry Burnett Lumsden, British army general (b. 1821)
- August 13 – Sir John Everett Millais, British Pre-Raphaelite painter (b. 1829)
- August 17 – Bridget Driscoll, early British automobile fatality (b. c. 1851)
- August 18 – Richard Avenarius, German-Swiss philosopher (b. 1843)
- August 25 – Sultan Hamad bin Thuwaini of Zanzibar (b. 1857)
- September 18 – Hippolyte Fizeau, French physicist (b. 1819)
- September 22 – Pavlos Kalligas, Greek jurist, politician (b. 1814)
- September 23 – Ivar Aasen, Norwegian philologist, lexicographer, playwright, and poet (b. 1813)
- September 24 – Louis Gerhard De Geer, 1st Prime Minister of Sweden (b. 1818)

=== October–December ===
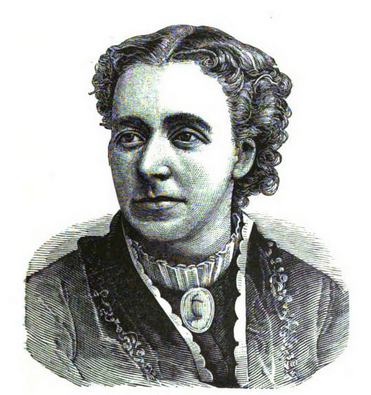
Margaret Eleanor Parker

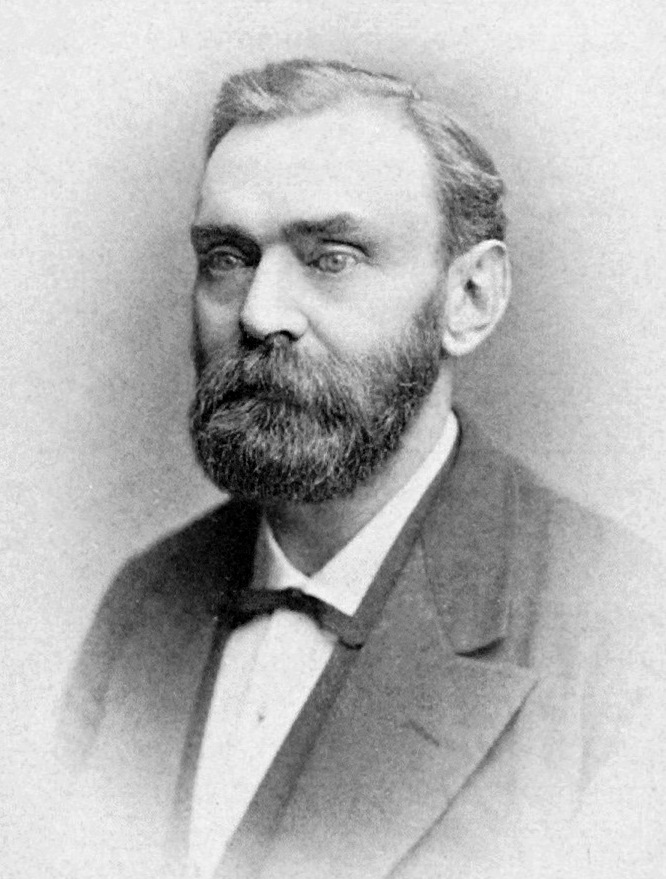
Alfred Nobel

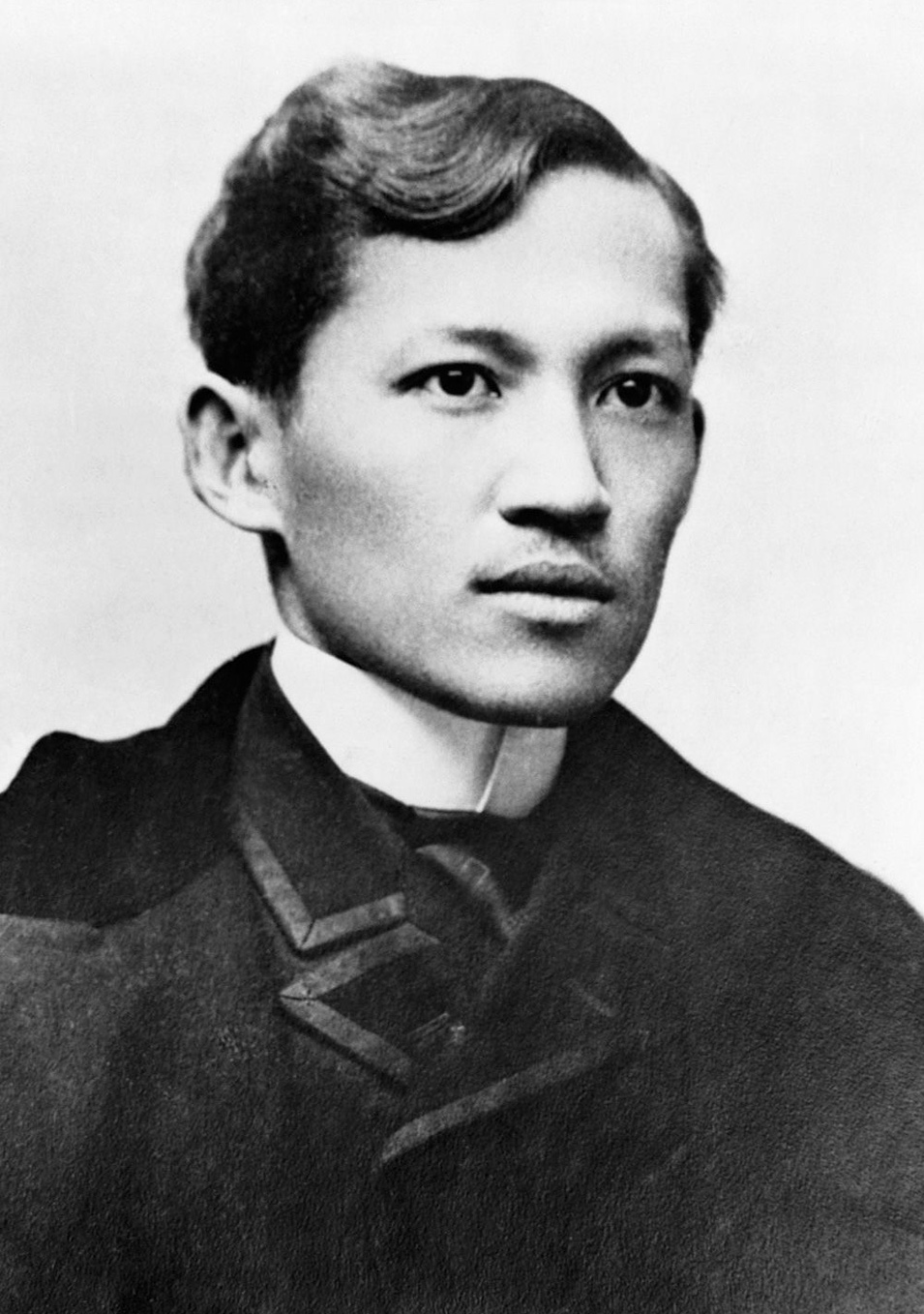
Jose Rizal

- October 3 – William Morris, English designer, poet and political activist (b. 1834)
- October 6 – Sir James Abbott, British army officer and colonial administrator in India (b. 1807)
- October 7 – Louis-Jules Trochu, French general and politician, 26th Prime Minister of France (b. 1815)
- October 8 – George du Maurier, French-born British cartoonist and writer (b. 1834)
- October 10 – Ferdinand von Mueller, German-born Australian botanist (b. 1825)
- October 11
  - Anton Bruckner, Austrian composer (b. 1824)
  - Edward White Benson, Archbishop of Canterbury (b. 1829)
- October 12 – Christian Emil Krag-Juel-Vind-Frijs, Prime Minister of Denmark (b. 1817)
- October 19 – Emmy Rappe, Swedish nursing pioneer (b. 1835)
- October 21 – James Henry Greathead, British engineer and inventor (b. 1844)
- October 23 – Columbus Delano, American statesman (b. 1809)
- October 26 – Paul-Armand Challemel-Lacour, French statesman (b. 1827)
- October 30 – Carol Benesch, Silesian and Romanian architect (b. 1822)
- November – Margaret Eleanor Parker, English social activist; first president of the British Women's Temperance Association (b. 1827)
- November 12 – Joseph James Cheeseman, Liberian politician, 12th President of Liberia (b. 1843)
- November 16 – Josip Šokčević, Croatian viceroy (b. 1811)
- November 22 – George Washington Gale Ferris Jr., American inventor of the Ferris wheel (b. 1859)
- November 23 – Ichiyō Higuchi, Japanese poet and novelist (b. 1872)
- November 26
  - Benjamin Apthorp Gould, American astronomer (b. 1824)
  - Coventry Patmore, English poet (b. 1823)
- December 10 – Alfred Nobel, Swedish inventor of dynamite, creator of the Nobel Prize (b. 1833)
- December 29
  - Jacob ben Moses Bachrach, noted Polish apologist of Rabbinic Judaism (b. 1824)
  - Sir Alexander Milne, 1st Baronet, British admiral of the fleet (b. 1806)
- December 30 – José Rizal, national hero of the Philippines (b. 1861)
