= Women's Total Abstinence Union =

- Abbreviation: WTAU
- Predecessor: British Women's Temperance Association
- Formation: 1893
- Headquarters: 4 Ludgate Hill, London
- Region served: UK
- Main organ: Wings

Women's Total Abstinence Union (WTAU) was a British women's organization active during the temperance movement in the United Kingdom. Its headquarters were at 4 Ludgate Hill, London. In addition to a president, there were 41 vice-presidents. The general committee met four times a years and consisted of members of the Executive Committee and 40 others elected annually from the council meetings of delegates. The Executive Committee consisted of the officers and 23 elected members. There was a sub-committee for junior work.

== History ==
After the British Women's Temperance Association (BWTA) held a contentious annual meeting in 1893 during which Lady Henry Somerset led the change in club policies to include the support for women's suffrage, the organization split. A new group was formed, the WTAU, which focused solely on temperance, while the BWTA was re-named the National British Women’s Temperance Association.

The organization's work included lectures, deputations, public meetings, drawing-room meetings, conferences, distribution of literature, correspondence and advice, opposing licenses at brewster sessions (magistrates' sessions for issuing liquor licenses), promoting the return of total abstainers to boards of guardians, and of members of school boards who were in favour of scientific temperance instruction in schools. It also introduced a Bill into Parliament for the abolition of grocers' licenses.

As of 1899, there were 223 federated societies, including junior and other attached branches, 249. The Nurses' National Total Abstinence League (established in 1897), and the Deaconesses' National Total Abstinence League (established in 1898) were examples of federated societies.

The official organ was a monthly entitled, Wings.

== Juvenile branch ==
In the WTAU, a Standing Committee on Junior work was elected and reported annually to the Legislative Council. The work undertaken by this Committee was the arrangement of sound scientific temperance instruction, upon which lectures were given at the WTAU Office in London, in Bristol, and elsewhere; the organization of Societies for Junior Members; and the general care and supervision of existing Societies. Women lecturers were prepared to visit the Provincial Societies and arrange for examinations when desired.

Suggested rules and work were printed for the guidance of those organizing Societies, but the Junior Societies formed their own plan of work according to the requirements of the neighbourhood. Some conducted Bands of Hope, others provided musical programmes for meetings and had working parties for such objects as helping the general funds of the WTAU, the Temperance Hospital, Temperance Orphanage, and Dr. Barnardo's Babies' Castle. Members of the Union also worked in many places in connection with the YWCA, and among young domestic servants. Circulars, with a pledge form attached, urging the importance of inculcating and strengthening temperance principles in the girls under their care were addressed to the 1,000 women visitors of the Metropolitan Association for Befriending Young Servants.

The claims of the Juniors were included in Wings, in which, month by month, appeared the "Junior Societies' Own Column" and the "Children's Column". At the Annual and Autumn Meetings of the WTAU, special Drawing Room Meetings and Conferences for Junior Members were convened.

WTAU members organized and carried on a school at the Agricultural Hall, for the children of the Travelling Showpeople during the six weeks' Annual World's Fair.

== Notable people ==
- Elizabeth Biddulph, Baroness Biddulph
- Lucy Ann Brooks
- Alice Brown Caine
- Mary Docwra
- Annie Henrietta Yorke
