= Lucy Brooks =

Lucy Brooks may refer to:

- Lucy Ann Brooks (1835–1926), English temperance advocate
- Lucy Goode Brooks (1818–1900), American slave who was instrumental in the founding of the Friends' Asylum for Colored Friends' Asylum for Colored Orphans in Richmond, Virginia
