= Copley, Ohio =

Unincorporated community in Ohio, U.S.

Coordinates: 41°05′56″N 81°38′40″W

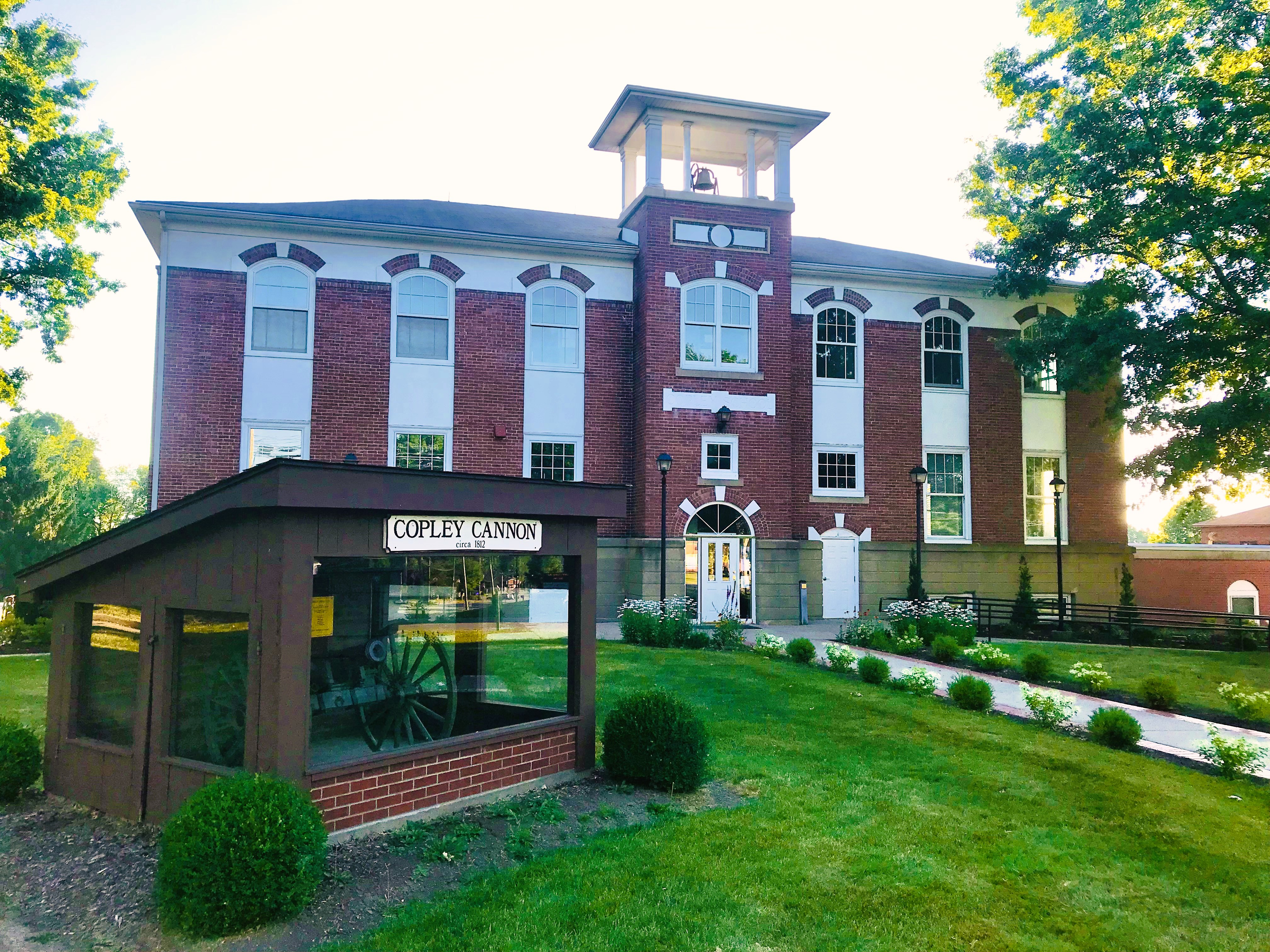
Town Hall in Copley, Ohio

Copley is an unincorporated community in Summit County, in the U.S. state of Ohio.

== History ==
Variant names were Greenfield and Copley Center. The first settlement at Copley Center was made around 1819. The community was named for its location near the geographical center of Copley Township. A post office called Copley Centre was established in 1835, the name was changed to Copley in 1841, and the post office closed in 1957.

== Notable people ==
- Delia L. Weatherby (1843—1916) social reformer and author
- Carrie Coon (born 1981) actress
