= White Ribbon Association =

British anti-drugs and gambling advocacy group

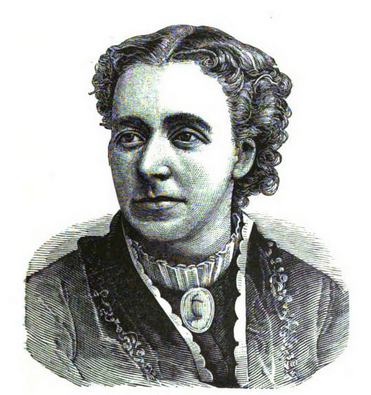
Margaret Eleanor Parker

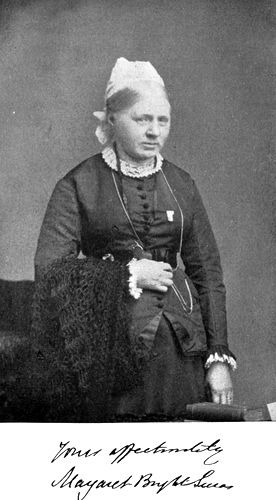
Margaret Bright Lucas

The White Ribbon Association (WRA), previously known as the British Women's Temperance Association (BWTA), is an organization that seeks to educate the public about alcohol, tobacco, and other drugs, as well as gambling.

== Founding of British Women's Temperance Association ==
The British Women's Temperance Association (BWTA) was founded following a meeting in Newcastle upon Tyne in 1876 featuring American temperance activist "Mother" Eliza Stewart. Margaret Eleanor Parker, a founding member, served as its first president. The next president was Clara Lucas Balfour. Margaret Bright Lucas, who toured with Stewart during these meetings, succeeded as BWTA president in 1878. The BWTA achieved greater success under her successor, Lady Henry Somerset, but ultimately British temperance was destined to achieve less than its American counterpart. Lady Henry was succeeded by Rosalind Howard, Countess of Carlisle, known as "The Radical Countess" for her opposition to alcohol consumption. Lucas was however, an important link in the Anglo-American women's reform networks as well as being a pioneer in British women's temperance.

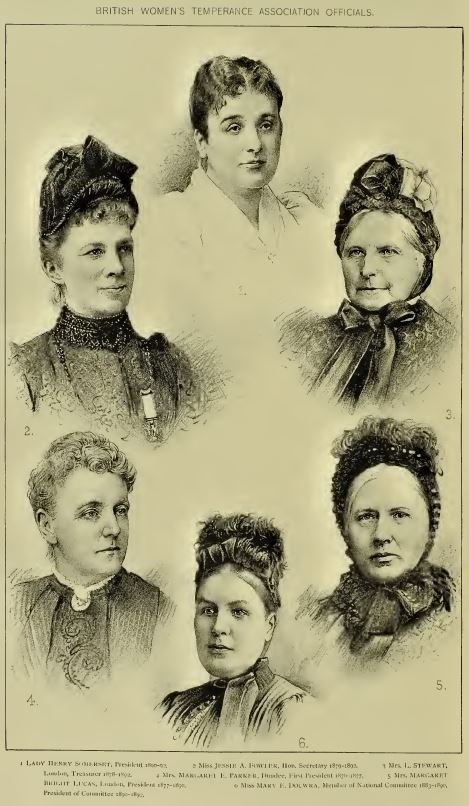
(1) Lady Henry Somerset, President 1890-92 (2) Miss Jessie A. Fowler, Hon. Secretary 1879-1892 (3) Mrs. L. Stewart, London, Treasurer 1878-1892 (4) Mrs. Margaret E. Parker, Dundee, First President 1876-1877 (5) Mrs. Margaret Bright Lucas, London, President 1877-1890 (6) Miss Mary E. Docwra, Member of National Committee 1883-1890, President of Committee 1890-1892

== Early years ==
In 1885, the association was affiliated to the World Woman's Christian Temperance Union (WWCTU), of which body Lucas was the first president. The pledge of the BWTA was, "I promise by God's help to abstain from all intoxicating drinks, and to try to induce others to do the same."

The association's internal organisation consisted of:

- National Executive Committee: National President, Vice President, Secretary and Treasurer as well as representatives from County Unions
- County Unions - to support branches in their areas and establish new ones
- Branches (throughout Great Britain) and from 1879, an autonomous but affiliated BWTA Scottish Christian Union.

The departments of the association were: Organization; Speakers' Bureau; "Y" (Young Women's) B. W. T. A.; Temperance Legions; Evangelistic; Bible Lessons and Study : Unfermented Wine at the Sacrament; Preventive; Social Purity; Social; Drawing-Room Meetings; Facts: Educational; Health and Hygiene; Adult Schools; High Schools and Private Schools; Legal; Brewster Sessions; Police Matrons; Women as Poor Law Guardians; Members of School Boards, etc.; Work Among Women Municipal Voters; Political; Literature and Press; Inebriate Women; Native Races; Traveling.

In the year 1893-94, 1,500 meetings were held by members of the National Executive Committee, and 2,000 in all were reported to headquarters; 300 new societies were formed; 8,500,000 pages of literature were issued, including the organ, The Women's Signal, which had a circulation of 16,271 per week. Temperance clubs worked to provide public drinking fountains, sometimes called a "temperance fountain" which were often placed opposite public houses to provide alternatives to alcohol. In response to a call by Lady Somerset in 1896, the White Ribbon Children's club funded the construction of a fountain with a bronze portrait of a "Cold Water Girl" mounted on a granite base. The fountain is now placed in the Eastern Victoria Gardens near to Victoria Embankment in London. During the World Wars, the branches and county unions set up kitchens, mobile canteens, recreation and refreshment rooms for military personnel.

After a contentious annual meeting in 1893 during which Lady Somerset led the change in club policies to include the support for women's suffrage, the organization split. A new group was formed, the Women's Total Abstinence Union (WTAU), which focused solely on temperance, electing former BWTA officers Lucy Ann Brooks, Docwra, and Martha Holland as WTAU officers. The BWTA was re-named the National British Women’s Temperance Association and its honorary secretary was Jane Aukland.

The Association supports a whiteribbon (publishing) company, an industrial farm home, a retreat for inebriate women, St. Mary's Training Home for Girls Alpha House, a preventive and rescue home. A Scottish Christian Union independent but affiliated to the British Women's Temperance Association was organised in 1876 -9, and had grown to 80,000 members, 332 branches by 1908. One of its members, Eliza Wigham became a vice-president of BWTA. In 1915, Christina Marshall Colville was elected president of the BWTA Scottish Christian Union.

== Activities ==
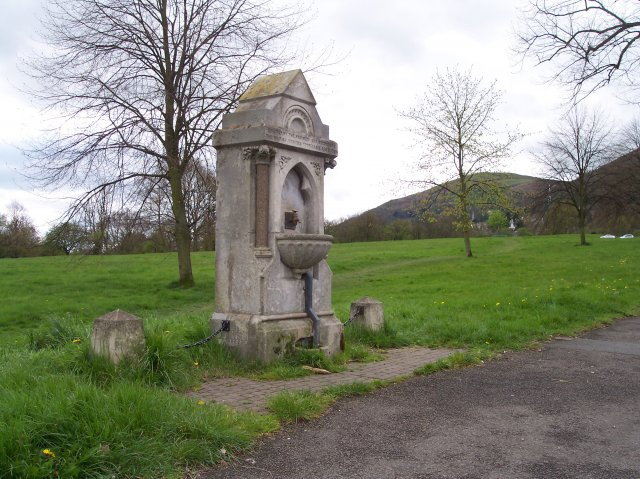
The Temperance Fountain in Malvern was erected by members and friends of the BWTA.

The BWTA ran many successful and lively girls' groups, known as Y-branches (for youth). These were often associated with Methodist and other non-conformist churches, and organised all kinds of activities as well as weekly meetings. One of their most successful was a "Masque of Noble Women", which was performed by dozens of branches all over Britain from 1915. A box of costumes was bought and lent out to branches along with copies of the script. Probably modelled on the suffragette "Pageant of Great Women", it featured popular heroines including Florence Nightingale, Queen Victoria, Boadicea and Elizabeth Barrett Browning.

After the BWTA became aroused to the fact of the alarming increase of inebriety among women, it studied the subject and, under the leadership of its president, Lady Henry Somerset, started in 1895, the Duxhurst Industrial Farm Colony, a voluntary in-patient residential treatment center for habitual alcoholic women. Situated about 4 miles (6.4 km) from Reigate railway station, the 180 acres (73 ha) "Village" contained home-like cottages, a church, the chaplain's lodge, farm buildings, a hospital, and a large dining and recreation hall.

In the 1990s a Mobile Education Unit would set up exhibits at festivals or shopping centres to raise awareness about the organization and its goals.

BWTA women often wore white ribbons as a symbol of the Temperance cause, and thus their organ was named the White Ribbon.

A permanent office for the National British Women's Temperance Association (NBWTA) opened in 1923 at 104 Gower Street, London. In 1952 the organisation moved to 23 Dawson Place in London, and in 2006 the headquarters were moved to 341 Tanworth Lane, Solihull.

== Transition to White Ribbon Association ==
In 2004, the organisation was re-named the White Ribbon Association. Today, the White Ribbon Association offers free services and resources focusing on health education and a variety of topics for children's displays. The White Ribbon Association welcomes visitors to the Archives where they have archived many products and records from the 19th and early 20th century.

== Notable people ==
- Jane Aukland
- Clara Lucas Balfour
- Florence Balgarnie
- Frances Julia Barnes
- Emily Rose Bleby
- Mary Shuttleworth Boden
- Jane Gemmill
- Rosalind Howard, Countess of Carlisle
- Mary Camilla Lawson
- Margaret Bright Lucas
- Ann Watt Milne
- Margaret Eleanor Parker
- Catherine Forrester Paton
- Lady Henry Somerset
- Delia L. Weatherby
- Agnes Weston
- Eliza Wigham
