= Delia L. Weatherby =

American social reformer, author

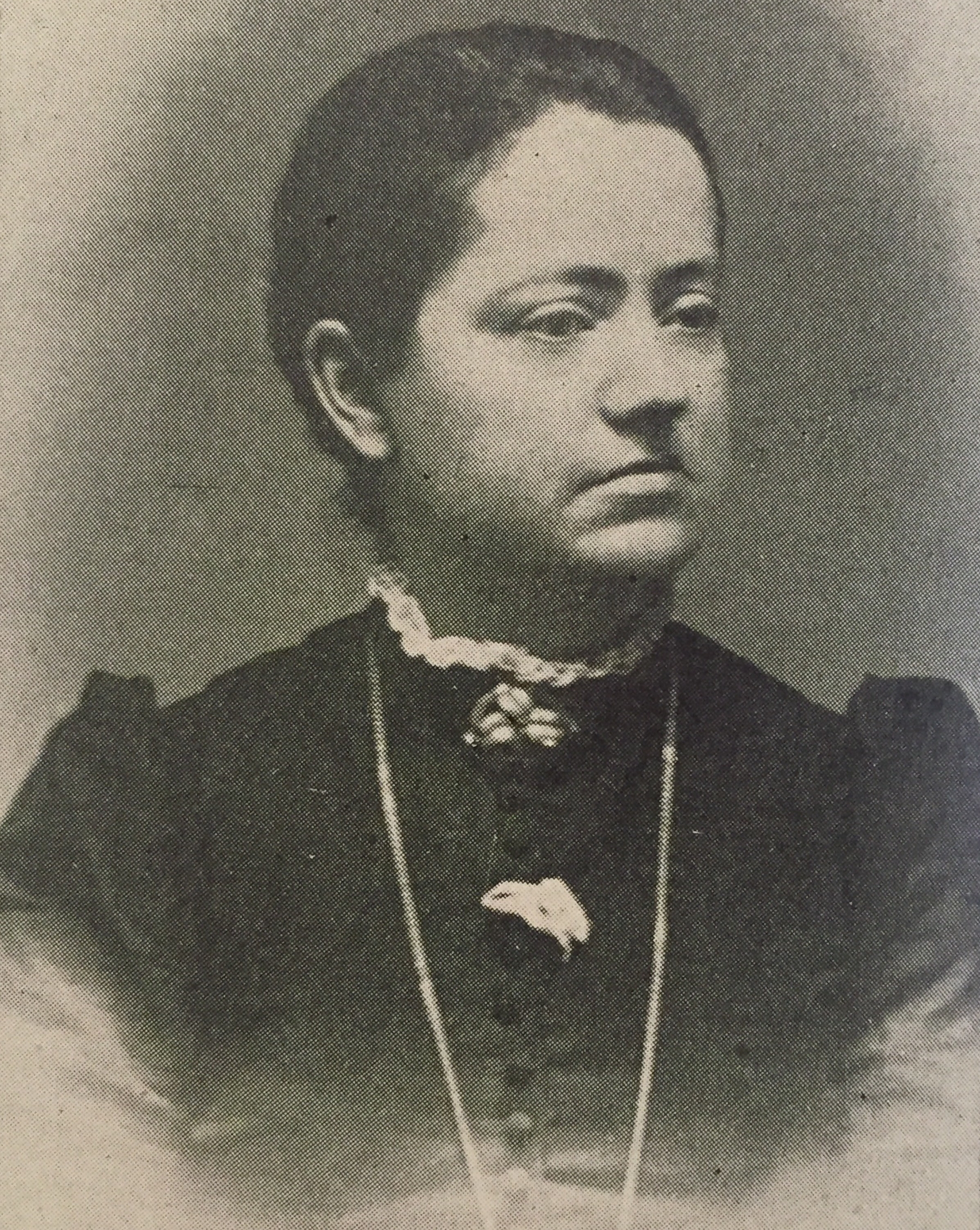
- Delia L. Weatherby, from A Woman of the Century (1893)
- Born: June 7, 1843; Copley, Ohio
- Died: November 6, 1916 (aged 73)
- Burial place: Oak Hill Cemetery (Lawrence, Kansas)
- Occupations: temperance reformer, author
- Organization(s): White Ribbon Association; Woman's Christian Temperance Union

Delia Lionia Stearns Weatherby (June 7, 1843 - November 6, 1916) was an American temperance reformer and author.

== Early life ==
Delia Lionia Stearns was born in Copley, Ohio, on June 7, 1843. Her father. Col. John C. Stearns, was an abolitionist and temperance worker.

She received an academic education and afterward taught school in her native town.

== Career ==
Delia L. Weatherby moved to Baldwin, Kansas with her husband, and was called to be the chair of mathematics at Baker University, but declined.

Inheriting the same disposition which made her father an abolitionist, she early became an active worker in the order of Good Templars. She could endure no compromise with intemperance, and wherever she lived she distinguished as an advanced thinker and a pronounced prohibitionist. She was a candidate on the prohibition ticket in 1886 for county superintendent of public instruction in Coffey County, Kansas. She was elected a lay delegate to the quadrennial meeting of the South Kansas Lay Conference of the Methodist Episcopal Church in 1888. In 1890 she was placed in nomination for the office of State superintendent of public instruction on the prohibition ticket.

She always took a great interest in the cause of education. In 1890 she was unanimously elected clerk of the school board in her home district. She was an alternate delegate from the fourth congressional district of Kansas to the National Prohibition Convention in 1892, and also secured, the same year, for the second time by the same party, the nomination for the office of superintendent of public instruction in her own county.

She belonged to the White Ribbon Association and was the president of the Coffey County Woman's Christian Temperance Union for several years. She was superintendent of the press department of the Kansas Woman's Christian Temperance Union and State reporter for The Union Signal.

She edited a temperance department in one of the country papers, and she frequently contributed to the press articles of prose and poetry, chiefly on the subject of temperance reformation.

== Personal life ==
In 1868 Delia L. Stearns became the wife of Rev. Samuel S. Weatherby (1841-1924), then a member of the North Ohio Conference of the Methodist Episcopal Church. In 1870 they moved to Baldwin, Kansas, where for nine years he served as professor of languages at Baker University. In 1880 her husband entered the ministry again, and for seven years she shared with her husband the toils and duties of an itinerant life, until failing health compelled him to retire from active work, and they moved to a country home, near LeRoy, Kansas.

She was the mother of three children: Olive Weatherby Quakenbush (1872-1920), Edward Stearns Weatherby (1876-1957), and a L.S. Weatherby, who later became a professor in a Los Angeles College.

She died on November 6, 1916, and is buried at Oak Hill Cemetery, Lawrence.
