= Ann Watt Milne =

Scottish temperance leader (1856 – at least 1928)

- Born: 1856-07-20; Fraserburgh, Scotland
- Occupation: Temperance leader
- Organization: British Women's Temperance Association
- Known for: President of the British Women's Temperance Association
- Spouse: Rev. G. C. Milne

Ann Watt Milne (1856 – no earlier than 1928) was a Scotch temperance leader who served as president of the British Women's Temperance Association (BWTA).

== Early life and education ==
Ann Watt was born at Watermill Farm, Fraserburgh, Scotland, July 20, 1856.

She was educated in the Young Ladies School at Fraserburgh and at St. Leonard's Boarding School, Banff.

== Career ==
As a young woman she became interested in the temperance cause, organizing a Women's Society for Temperance and other social reform. She was made president of the Society, which grew in power and influence until its membership reached 1,000, and took an active part in its work, also writing tracts and pamphlets in its interest. She was active in opposing the granting of new licenses in Fraserburgh and the renewal of licenses whose owners had violated the law. Her local temperance activities led to her appointment on the Agency Staff of the Scottish Permissive Bill and Temperance Association in Glasgow. She organized a Ladies’ Auxiliary to the Association, which has ever since proved a helpful adjunct to the ordinary work of that organization. After four years of active service with the Association she resigned because of her marriage to the Rev. G. C. Milne, after which she removed to Aberdeen.

Milne became associated with the temperance organizations of Aberdeen, and was a leader in the local branches of the BWTA. On the formation of the Aberdeen District Union, including the counties of Aberdeen and Banff, she was elected its first president. She also took a prominent part in the work of the National Temperance Council of Scotland. In 1901, Milne was appointed Parliamentary superintendent of the BWTA's, Scottish Christian Union (SCU) for Scotland, which office she still held in 1928. She thus rendered helpful service in connection with the enactment of the Temperance (Scotland) Act (1913).

In 1906, she was elected vice-president of the BWTA, serving until 1923, when she became president of the Association, and she was reelected in 1924. During many years, she rendered valuable service to the Association as one of its most gifted and acceptable speakers. She frequently represented that body at national and international temperance gatherings. She was also a member of the executive of the Scottish Temperance Alliance, and addressed meetings throughout England, Scotland, and Ireland. Representing Scotland, she served on the General Council and the executive committee of the World League Against Alcoholism.

During World War I, Milne was active in patriotic work. She was president of the Aberdeen Women's Patriotic Society for the wives of soldiers and sailors. She was the leader in organizing a great National Memorial with a quarter of a million signatures, asking the Prime Minister and the Government to prohibit the liquor traffic during the period of the War and six months thereafter, and she was one of the members of the committee that presented it to the Prime Minister, through the Secretary for Scotland.

== Personal life ==
She was twice married: (1) to Dr. J. L. Henderson (died soon after marriage); (2) in 1898, to the Rev. George Coates Milne, of Aberdeen. Rev. Milne served as President of the Congregational Union of Scotland.
