= Edmund Wright Brooks =

English Quaker philanthropist and cement maker (1834 - 1928)

Edmund Wright Brooks (29 September 1834 – 22 June 1928) was an English Quaker philanthropist and cement maker. He was active in the Anti-Slavery movement and also in famine relief in Russia and aid to Armenians. He was joint secretary and then chair of the Friends War Victims Relief Committee.

== Family background ==
He was born 29 September 1834 at Melksham, in Wiltshire, of Quaker parents. He was the son of Edmund Brooks (1802–1893), baker, warehouseman, farmer and Ann Wright (1799?–1884), daughter of David Wright (1774?–1857) of Bury St Edmunds, baker, and Ann Wright (1778?–1827). He had two brothers. About 1850 the family moved to Esher, Surrey, where his father was a farmer.

== Education ==
He was educated at the Sidcot School. He then entered the engineering works of John Fowler & Co., Leeds, and built up a solid position in the firm so that he was able to take a leading part in the engineering industry.

In 1860, he moved to Guildford in Surrey, where he practised as an engineer and in 1870, moved to Grays in Essex.

== Business interests ==
In the cement business, he was a partner with his sons and sons-in-law in Hilton, Anderson Brooks, & Co earlier Brooks, Shoobridge and Co. with activities at Grays in Essex and Halling, Faversham and Upnor in Kent. At one time, his company employed the largest number of staff of any company in Essex. He was fully occupied with this business until the early 1890s, when he became more involved with Quaker and philanthropic work.

== Quaker interests ==
He was treasurer the Anti-Slavery Society until his resignation in 1926. He was Secretary of the British Quaker Anti-Slavery Committee and was concerned among other things with the establishment in 1897 of a Mission in Pemba, one of the Zanzibar islands, now in Tanzania, to help freed and escaped slaves there. Slavery was finally legally abolished in Zanzibar in 1909.

Because of his knowledge of Russian and his expertise, he was asked by the Meeting for Sufferings in November 1891 to go with Francis William Fox to Russia and investigate the reported famine there. Brooks returned, reported on 15 January 1892 to the Meeting and left again with Herbert Sefton Jones, who was fluent in Russian, on 15 February with funds for a Quaker relief effort and an urgent need to distribute food before the spring thaw would make transportation difficult. The Friends concentrated their efforts on Samara but also went to Tatarstan and other adjacent regions. Some of the travel was by railway but much was by horse drawn sledge. Brooks returned home on 12 April. In the end, the Russian famine of 1891–92 killed between 375,000 and 500,000 people.

In 1895 he and Thomas William Marsh (1833–1902) waited on the Czar to plead the cause of religious dissenters in Russia, and he was later active on behalf of the Dukhobors when permission was secured for them to emigrate. In 1899 he visited Leo Tolstoy with John Bellows.

Between 1896 and 1899, he was clerk of the Friends Armenian Relief Committee, which raised £18,000.

He was a Joint Secretary, with Ruth Fry of Friends War Victims Relief Committee 1914–24, He was later chairman of its executive committee, and if needed, giving almost daily help to the small and overworked office staff. His son, Alfred, also served on this committee.

== Public service and politics ==
He had always been preoccupied with education. At Guildford he had been secretary of the British School, and at Grays, he was a governor of Palmer's Endowed School and the first chairman of the Grays School Board. He also served on the Committee of Ackworth School, a Quaker school in Yorkshire.

He was involved in local government and philanthropic undertakings, and served as a JP for 30 years.

He stood for Parliament in the Essex, South East constituency, at the General Election of 1892 as a Gladstonian Liberal, against the sitting Conservative MP, Major F C Rasch.

He was a founder of Friends of Armenia which provided relief to Armenians, in 1897, and long term honorary treasurer.

== Marriage, family and death ==
On 29 June 1859, he married Lucy Ann Marsh (1835–1926), daughter of Richard Marsh (1795–1878) of Strood, draper, and Ann Marsh (born Morris, 1793–1891).

There were four sons and six daughters, including Herbert Edmund Brooks (1860–1931), Alfred Brooks (1861–1952) and Howard Brooks (1868–1948), who succeeded him in the cement business. According to DQB and Digest Register in the Library of the Society of Friends, the children were:

- Herbert Edmund (born 18 May 1860, Kingston – died 1931)
- Alfred (born 9 November 1861, Guildford – died 1952), grandfather of Anthony Brooks
- Edith Annie (born 9 February 1863, Guildford – died 22 June 1890)
- Charles (born 1 August 1864, Guildford – died 1948)
- Lucy Ellen (born 3 September 1866, Guildford – died 1948)
- Howard (born 8 May 1868, Guildford)
- Ethel Mary (born 17 April 1870, Grays)
- Mabel Winifred (born 11 November 1872, Grays)
- Gertrude (born 12 February 1875, Grays)
- Florence (born 22 March 1877, Grays)

He died at his home, 'Duval', Grays, 22 June 1928.

Of the nine surviving children, one resigned Quaker membership in 1886 and three more in 1915. His daughter Mabel Winifred (b. 1872) remained a Friend and married, in 1897, Henry Jeffrey Simpson (1868–1938) an employee and later partner in the family cement manufacturing company, namely the British Portland Cement manufacturer limited (at one time the largest in Essex). Henry and had Mabel had three sons and Mabel died in 1911 (buried in the Friends burial ground of Wanstead).
