= Margaret Eleanor Parker =

British social activist and travel writer (1827–1896)

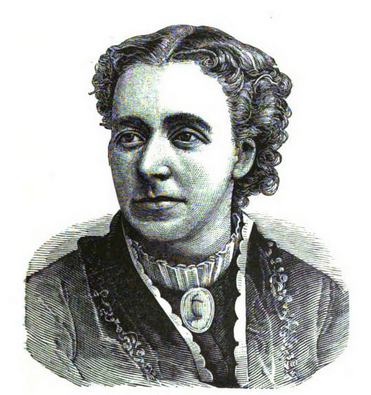
- Born: 1827; England
- Died: 1896 (aged 68–69); Dundee, Scotland
- Occupations: social activist, social reformer, travel writer
- Spouse: Edward Parker
- Writing career
- Notable work: Six Happy Months amongst the Americans
- Literary movement: temperance

Margaret Eleanor Parker (writing as M. E. Parker; 1827–1896) was a British social activist and reformer who was involved in the temperance movement. She was a founding member of the British Women's Temperance Association (BWTA) in 1876, and served as its first president. Parker was a delegate to the 1876 International Organisation of Good Templars (IOGT) meeting which led to the formation of the BWTA. She was also instrumental in founding the World Woman's Christian Temperance Union (WWCTU). In 1881, she founded another type of women's association, one which focused on horticulture and supply, but it did not flourish. Parker's travels in the Eastern United States were described in her book, Six Happy Months amongst the Americans (1874).

== Early life ==
Parker was born in England in 1827, (Note: Blocker (2003) records Parker's year of birth as 1828.) of an old Tory or Conservative line.

== Career ==
Her charitable activities began with paying off church debts and raising funds for "church extension."

She worked for woman suffrage side by side with the party of John Stuart Mill. A wife, mother, and housekeeper, she addressed the British Social Science Congress on the question of capital and labor. She marshaled a procession of 60 of her townswomen to the headquarters of the magistrate, where they presented a no-license petition with 9,000 names of women — all this in the days of the Women's Christian Temperance Union (WCTU) Women's Crusade and under its inspiration.

Parker was a great admirer of the U.S. She and her husband were converted by John B. Gough after one of his lectures in Dundee, becoming total abstainers. Concerning her appreciation of "Yankee Notions," Parker once wrote: "I have an American cook stove in my kitchen, an American sewing-machine in my sitting-room, and all the American books I can get in my library, and now I must have your wide-awake American paper, the Boston Woman's Journal."

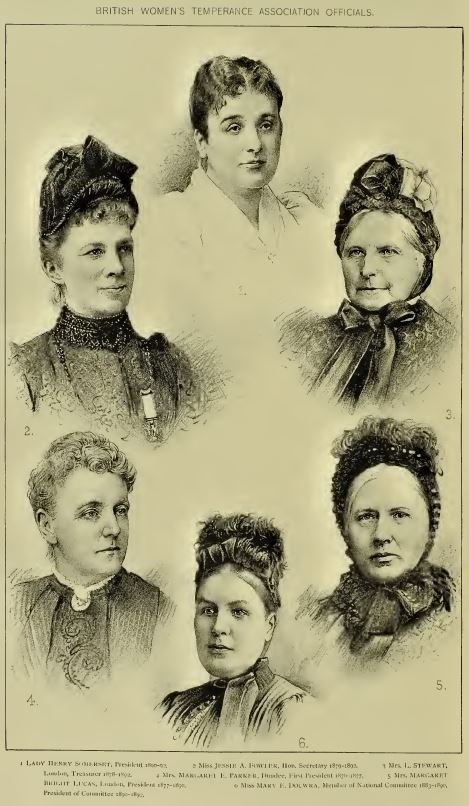
(1) Lady Henry Somerset, President 1890-92 (2) Miss Jessie A. Fowler, Hon. Secretary 1879-1892 (3) Mrs. L. Stewart, London, Treasurer 1878-1892 (4) Mrs. Margaret E. Parker, Dundee, First President 1876-1877 (5) Mrs. Margaret Bright Lucas, London, President 1877-1890 (6) Miss Mary E. Docwra, Member of National Committee 1883-1890, President of Committee 1890-1892

Active as she had always been in reforms, the Crusade movement stirred Parker as nothing else had ever done. The presentation of her temperance petition to the authorities of Dundee struck the key-note for the United Kingdom, aroused Christian women to a sense of their responsibility, and led to the organization of temperance unions in Dundee and many other towns. The press having brought to her the name of Mother Stewart of Ohio, as prominently connected with the Crusade, Parker invited her to Scotland, and arranged a temperance trip for her which greatly enlisted the public interest, and from which resulted a meeting in April 1876, at Newcastle-on-Tyne. Delegates from all parts of the UK were present. Women who had never spoken on a platform before spoke with fluency and convincing earnestness, and proceeded, with all due observance of parliamentary forms, to organize the "British Women's Christian Temperance Union." Parker was elected president of this new society, and was sent as a delegate to the Woman's International Temperance Convention which met in the Academy of Music, Philadelphia, in June 1876. There, Parker was unanimously elected President of the International WCTU, the avowed object of which was "to spread a temperance Gospel to the ends of the earth."

Twice after the Crusade, Parker visited the U.S. to study the spirit and methods of the WCTU work. A book, entitled Six Happy Weeks among the Americans, recorded her impression of the land she had so long desired to see. A reception was given her by Sorosis, and she was elected a member of that society and of the World's Congress of Representative Women.

Parker was not an orator, but her refined manners and gentle presence, combined with her strong sense and ready wit, made her one of the favorite speakers at the World's Columbian Exposition of 1893, called by the National Temperance Society, of which John Newton Stearns was Secretary.

Nowhere was her influence so great as in her own city. Twice, she was offered a place on the School Board of Dundee, which she declined only that she might give her time to the work of the local Woman's Temperance Union, of which she was President since its organization, and to the duties of her more distinguished but hardly more onerous office as President of the international temperance union.

== Personal life ==
Born in England, Parker resided in Scotland.

She married Edward Parker, proprietor of an extensive manufactory in Dundee. He was a member of a prominent Wesleyan Methodist manufacturing family of that city. They had six children: five sons and one daughter. Their residence, The Cliff, "looked off upon the German Ocean and old St. Andrew's of classic memory." It was a model Scotch home. After Margaret Bright Lucas succeeded her as president of the BWTA, Parker and her family lived in England, working side by side with her successor. Like Lucas, Parker was a Quaker. Parker died in Dundee in November 1896.
