= Jane Aukland =

British temperance campaigner

- Born: Jane Munday Langfield; 30 January 1836; Newington, Surrey, England
- Died: 24 December 1925 (aged 89); Finsbury Park, London, England
- Known for: Temperance and vegetarianism activism
- Spouse: John Loxley Aukland (m. 1865)

Jane Munday Aukland (née Langfield; 30 January 1836 – 24 December 1925) was an English temperance and vegetarianism campaigner. She was the founding honorary secretary of the British Women's Temperance Association.

== Biography ==
Aukland was born Jane Munday Langfield on 30 January 1836 in Newington, Surrey, to Mary Ann Langfield (née Raymond) and John Langfield, a greengrocer. She was baptised on 21 February.

Aukland married John Loxley Aukland on 1 January 1865. They were both supporters of the temperance movement and her husband was an underwriter at Lloyd's of London. She had first became involved after she heard talks by Samuel Bowly president of the National Temperance League, Mrs. Stewart and Mrs. Scholefield from Newcastle. She and her husband were also supporters of the Congregational church in Finsbury Park, London.

Aukland was invited to join the executive of the British Women's Temperance Association, under the presidency of Margaret Bright Lucas. Aukland was creditted with founding new branches of the Association among the British middle classes. She would speak at drawing room meetings and she encouraged people to form branches.

In February 1884, the National Temperance Federation (NTF) organised a meeting at Exeter Hall in London. Aukland and the phrenologist Jessie Allen Fowler were sent as delegates. They successfully recommended that the British Women's Temperance Association should become an NTF affiliate.

In 1893, the British women's temperance movement split over the emerging subject of women's suffrage. Some argued that the movement should support this as a related issue, while others saw this as a distraction from the movement's main mission. Aukland believed in "do everything" and in the controversial Lady Henry Somerset. Lady Somerset continued to lead the Association when it was renamed the National British Women's Temperance Association and Aukland became its honorary secretary.

Aukland also organised an organisation that provided coffee carts for workers. Four of her carts sold £500 worth of refreshments in one year.

Aukland died in Finsbury Park on 24 December 1925.
