= Mary Docwra =

British temperance activist (1847–1914)

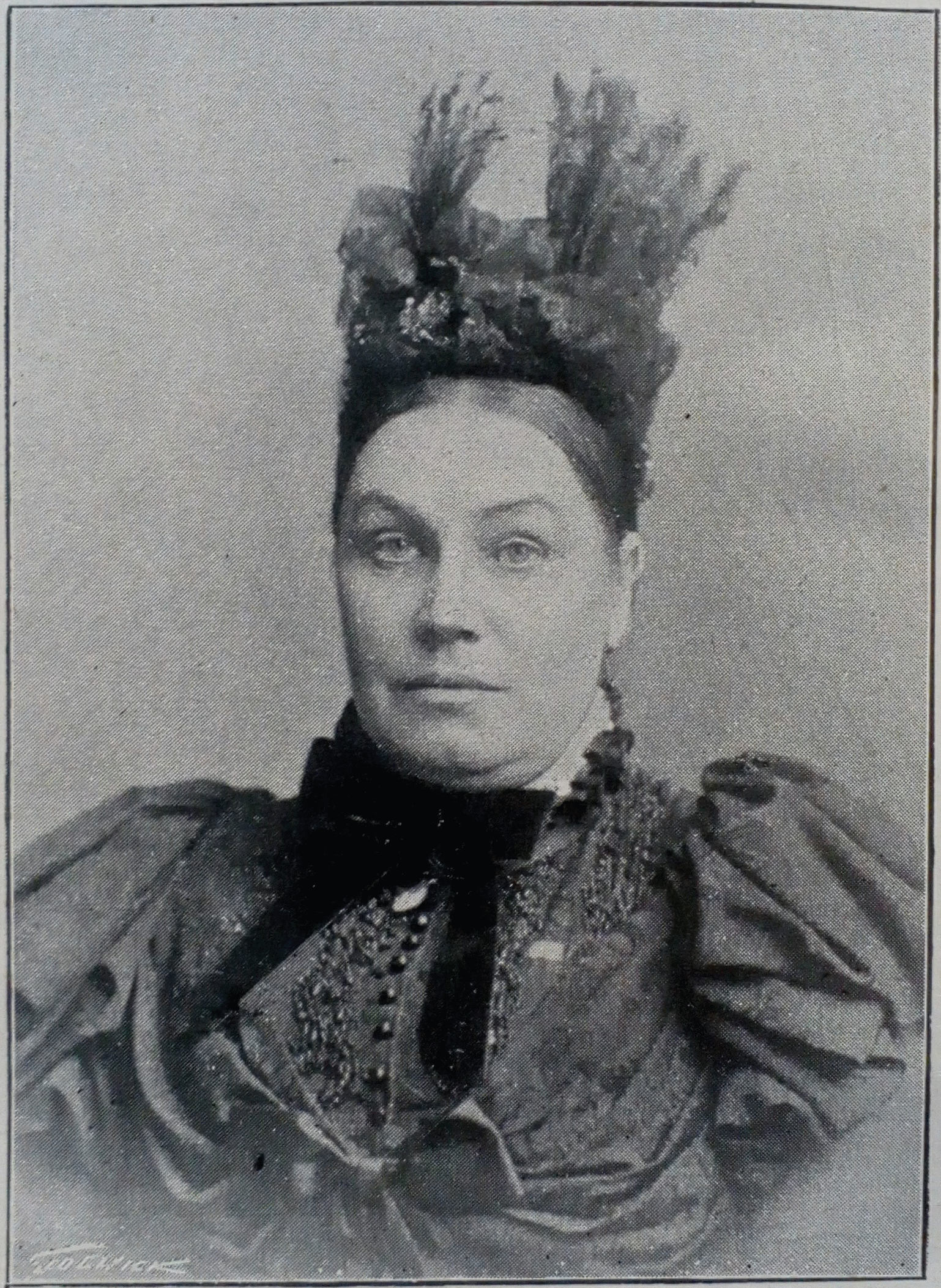
- Mary Docwra
- Born: Mary Elizabeth Docwra; 20 January 1847; Kelvedon
- Died: 1914 (aged 66–67)
- Occupation: Temperance activist

Mary Elizabeth Docwra (20 January 1847 – 1914) was a British temperance activist who was president of the British Women’s Temperance Association in 1898.

== Life ==
Docwra was born in Kelvedon in Essex in 1847 to Mary Jesup (born Knight) and George Docwra. Her parents were Quakers and she was the third of her children and they would have another four. All of their children campaigned for temperance and Mary's parents abstained from alcohol entirely although neither had when they married.

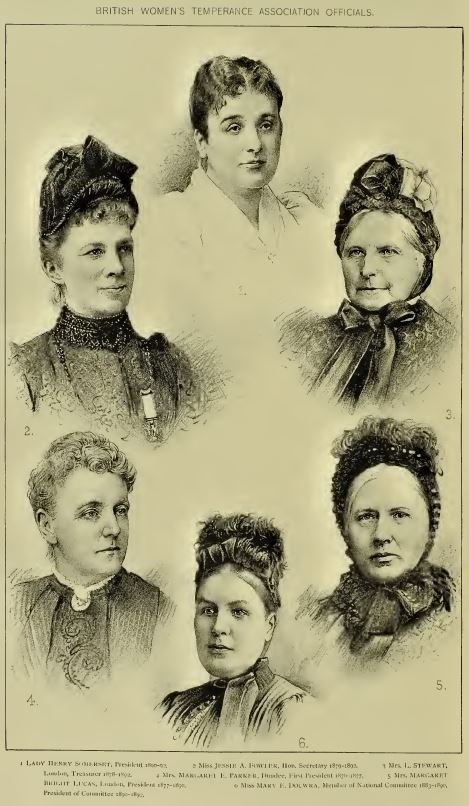
(1) Lady Henry Somerset, President 1890-92 (2) Miss Jessie A. Fowler, Hon. Secretary 1879-1892 (3) Mrs. L. Stewart, London, Treasurer 1878-1892 (4) Mrs. Margaret E. Parker, Dundee, First President 1876-1877 (5) Mrs. Margaret Bright Lucas, London, President 1877-1890 (6) Miss Mary E. Docwra, Member of National Committee 1883-1890, President of Committee 1890-1892

She was a founder member of the British Women’s Temperance Association when it was founded in Newcastle-upon-Tyne in 1847. The first minutes record that she and her sister Lucy could speak about temperance if required.

She would attend National meetings of the BWTA to represent the Kelvedon branch where her mother was the local President. In 1879 she put forward the idea of a cook book. She became the lead for the project gathering together recipes during 1879 and "The Temperance Cookery Book " was ready for publication in March 1880. It became known as "The Non-Alcoholic Cookery Book" and it was sold out within weeks. Her involvement with the cookery book mirrored her increased profile at the national level. The cookery book was updated and republished in 1890.

In 1896 she was one of three BWTA delegates who attended the Nation Union of Women Workers conference. They returned and recommended that the BWTA should affiliate to the NUWW which was an umbrella organisation. However the BWTA could not agree to join the organisation because some were worried at its political stance, however the BWTA could not make the political stand of refusing to join. It never made a decision.

She became the President of the BWTA in 1898 and served until 1900.
