= Lucy Ann Brooks =

English temperance advocate (1835–1926)

- Born: Lucy Ann Marsh; 31 May 1835; Strood, Kent, England
- Died: 25 March 1926 (aged 90)
- Occupation: Temperance advocate
- Organizations: British Women's Temperance Association; Women's Total Abstinence Union
- Spouse: Edmund Wright Brooks (m. 1859)
- Relatives: Anthony Brooks (great-grandson)

Lucy Ann Brooks (née Marsh; 31 May 1835 – 25 March 1926) was an English temperance advocate. She was an officer of the British Women's Temperance Association (BWTA) before becoming a co-founder and president of the Women's Total Abstinence Union (WTAU).

== Early life and education ==
Lucy Ann (sometimes spelled "Anne") Marsh was born at Strood, Kent, May 31, 1835. Her parents were Richard Marsh (1795–1878), of Kingston, Surrey, draper, and Ann Marsh (born Morris, 1793–1891).

She was educated in the Friends' School at Croydon.

Brooks signed the abstinence pledge at eight years of age, but while still a young girl had followed the advice of her physician and taken medicine compounded with alcohol as was prescribed in those days. It was not until she reached the age of 18 that she determined to assert herself and return to strictly total-abstinence principles in sickness as well as in health.

== Career ==
In 1859, she married Edmund Wright Brooks. For many years, the couple made their home at Grays, Essex.

Together with her husband, Brooks joined the Independent Order of Good Templars early in their married life, and both became actively enlisted in the work of the Order. It was in the lodge meetings that Mrs. Brooks first attempted to read and speak in public. Beginning with fear and trembling, she gradually acquired the ability to address the largest audiences.

In 1893, she was one of the founders of the WTAU and served successively as honorary secretary, president, and member of the executive committee. In the summer of 1897, Mr. and Mrs. Brooks held a garden party at their home "Duvals", Grays, for temperance workers and Friends which included a meeting, under the presidency of the host, at which, as far as possible, a representative from each centre was invited to speak. In 1898, Mrs. Brooks served on the Women Friends' Central Committee on Temperance.

Mr. and Mrs. Brooks, in association with a few Friends, were instrumental in starting a coffee-tavern at Grays, which proved a great boon to the people who needed it most as a welcome substitute for the pub. During the Russian famine of 1891–1892, Mr. Brooks was sent to that country by the Society of Friends to investigate and report on the situation. In subsequent visits, Mrs. Brooks accompanied him, and they extended their travels through Switzerland, Germany, France, Italy, and other countries. Their first-hand observations on the habits of the people, and the relation between poverty and drink in these foreign lands contributed much to the informing character of the addresses delivered by them before various bodies.

== Personal life ==
On 29 June 1859, she married Edmund Wright Brooks. There were four sons and six daughters, including Herbert Edmund Brooks (1860–1931), (Note: H. E. Brooks was chairman of Essex County Council in 1930 and 1931, until his death on 13 March 1931.) Alfred Brooks (1861–1952) and Howard Brooks (1868–1948), who succeeded him in the cement business. According to DQB and Digest Register at The Library of the Society of Friends, (Note: The Library of the Society of Friends, London holds a transcript of the Registers of Birth, Death and Marriage of English, Scottish and Welsh Quaker Monthly Meetings and a typescript Dictionary of Quaker Biography (DQB).) the children were:

- Herbert Edmund (born 18 May 1860, Kingston – died 1931)
- Alfred (born 9 November 1861, Guildford – died 1952), grandfather of Anthony Brooks
- Edith Annie (born 9 February 1863, Guildford – died 22 June 1890)
- Charles (born 1 August 1864, Guildford – died 1948)
- Lucy Ellen (born 3 September 1866, Guildford – died 1948)
- Howard (born 8 May 1868, Guildford)
- Ethel Mary (born 17 April 1870, Grays)
- Mabel Winifred (born 11 November 1872, Grays)
- Gertrude (born 12 February 1875, Grays)
- Florence (born 22 March 1877, Grays)

Of the nine surviving children, one resigned Quaker membership in 1886 and three more in 1915. His daughter Mabel Winifred (b. 1872) remained a Friend and married, in 1897, Henry Jeffrey Simpson (1868–1938) an employee and later partner in the family cement manufacturing company, namely the British Portland Cement manufacturer limited (at one time the largest in Essex). Henry and had Mabel had three sons and Mabel died in 1911 (buried in the Friends burial ground of Wanstead).

Lucy Ann Brooks died in March 1926, leaving effects worth just over £15,000 to her sons Herbert, Alfred and Howard.
