= Jessie Allen Fowler =

American campaigner for temperance and a phrenologist

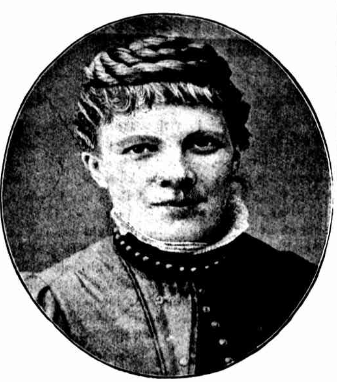
- Born: 11 July 1856
- Died: 15 October 1932 (aged 76)
- Occupation: phrenologist
- Organizations: British Women's Temperance Association

Jessie Fowler (1856–1932) was an American campaigner for temperance and a phrenologist. She was the honorary secretary of the British Women's Temperance Association. She made short animated films and published her claims about predicting the future and the character of criminals.

== Life ==
Fowler was one of the three daughters of the physician Lydia Folger Fowler and the leading phrenologist Professor Lorenzo Niles Fowler She was born in New York on 11 July 1856.

Her father and her mother were both writers and advocates for Temperance and her mother was elected as the honorary secretary of the British Women's Temperance Association in 1879 which is now known as the White Ribbon Association. In February 1884 the National Temperance Federation (NTF) organised a meeting at Exeter Hall in London. Fowler and Jane Aukland were both sent as delegates. They successfully recommended that the British Women's Temperance Association should become an NTF affiliate.

In January 1888 she was in Melbourne on a professional visit addressing people at the Melbourne Athenaeum. She was offering lectures and phrenological consultations.

Her father had a stroke and in 1896 she and her father returned to America where Jessie started to manage the Phrenological Journal Her father soon had another stroke and he died in New Jersey at his sister's house. In 1898 Jessie was writing about phrenology and “the world’s races”.

His sister was Charlotte Fowler Wells who died in 1901 when Jessie was taking a one-year course at New York University called "Women's Law". The company of Fowler and Wells now belonged to her. Two years later she was writing her claims about how phrenology could help predict the future.

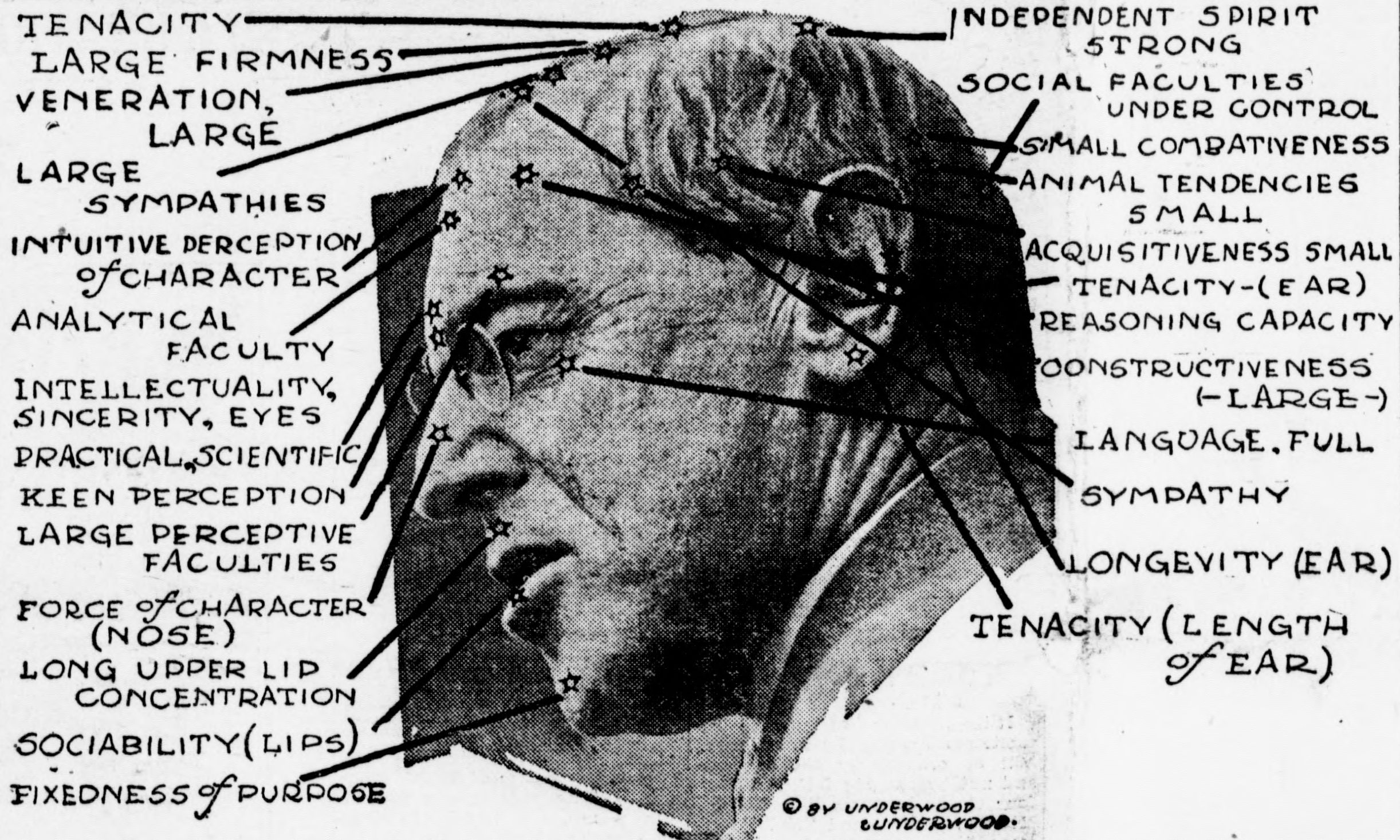
Phrenology of Woodrow Wilson

On 1912 she published her phrenological study of the American President Woodrow Wilson which included analysis of his head shape, his nose, chin and ears. Public interest in phrenology was not as high as it was but she continued to publish her writings. In 1917 several short animated films were made by Paul Terry with scripts by Fowler. They were Character as Revealed by the Ear, Character as Revealed by the Eye, Character as Revealed by the Mouth and Character as Revealed by the Nose.

In 1916 she made a phrenological study of the head of Pancho Villa and in 1922 she speculated on the future life of a child born with criminal parents.

Fowler had been born in New York and that is where she was buried after she died on 15 October 1932.
