= Brentry =

Suburb of Bristol, England

Coordinates: 51.51°N 2.61°W

- Location within Bristol
- OS grid reference: ST577792
- Unitary authority: Bristol
- Region: South West
- Country: England
- Sovereign state: United Kingdom
- Post town: BRISTOL
- Postcode district: BS10
- Dialling code: 0117
- Police: Avon and Somerset
- Fire: Avon
- Ambulance: South Western
- UK Parliament: Bristol North West

Brentry is a suburb of north Bristol, England, between Henbury and Southmead which is spread along the southern edge of the Filton to Avonmouth railway line.

== Description ==
The boundaries of Brentry are not well defined. The settlement grew around the junction of two roads, where a public house, the Old Crow, has long been established. The north–south road, Passage Road (now the A4018), was a turnpike road from Bristol to South Wales via New Passage or the Old Passage at Aust Ferry. When the new Filton By-Pass (now part of the M5 motorway) was opened in 1962, the route became an arterial road linking the new road to the centre of Bristol. The east–west route (B4057) is now of only local importance, but in the 1930s it carried A38 traffic by-passing Bristol. The through route was cut by the runway for the giant Bristol Brabazon aircraft built in 1949.

The area east of the junction was developed in the 20th century, and Brentry is now sometimes considered to extend as far as the Filton Golf Course, south of Filton Aerodrome, including an area east of Charlton Road known as Charlton Mead, named from the former hamlet of Charlton.

Brentry has a mix of private housing and former council housing. It has a primary school.

Pen Park Hole is a large cavern, to which access is strictly limited, near Brentry at the edge of Filton Golf Course.

Brentry Hospital was founded in 1898 as the Brentry Certified Inebriate Reformatory. It joined the National Health Service as Brentry Hospital in 1948. After the hospital closed in 2000, the main building was converted into residential apartments and became known as Repton Hall. The grounds, now known as Royal Victoria Park, are Grade II listed by English Heritage in the Register of Historic Parks and Gardens.

== Industry ==
Brentry is a predominantly residential area. There are however pockets of industry and commerce namely Charlton Road, Charlton Lane and Wyck Beck Road. A former hospital laundry site just off Charlton Road now sees the Pieminister Pie Factory. On Charlton Road there is a row of shops with a hairdresser, convenience grocery store and take-aways. On Wyck Beck Road there is a car repair garage, blue glass retailer and car hire business.

The closest major commercial and industrial hubs are Avonmouth Docks where there is light and heavy industry. Cribbs Causeway is the nearest major retail hub. There are also major employment sites in nearby Filton where a significant regional aerospace presence can be found.
