= 1898 in the United Kingdom =

Events from the year 1898 in the United Kingdom.

== Incumbents ==
- Monarch – Victoria
- Prime Minister – Robert Gascoyne-Cecil, 3rd Marquess of Salisbury (Coalition)

== Events ==
- 9 January – Richard Archer Prince, accused of murdering fellow actor William Terriss the previous year, appears before the Old Bailey to stand trial. He is later found guilty of murder but, because of his insanity, is sent to Broadmoor lunatic asylum.
- 12 February – the car belonging to Henry Lindfield of Brighton runs away on a hill in Purley, Surrey and hits a tree; thus he becomes the world's first fatality from an automobile accident on the public highway.
- 15 February – the World Figure Skating Championships are held in London.
- 5 April – Portsmouth F.C. founded at 12 High Street, Old Portsmouth.
- 8 April – Mahdist War: British and Egyptian victory at the Battle of Atbara.
- 19 April – Whitwick Colliery disaster: an underground fire kills 35 coal miners in Leicestershire's worst mining tragedy.
- 30 May – William Ramsay and Morris Travers make the first of their discovery of noble gases, krypton, followed on 7 June by neon and on 12 July by xenon at University College London.
- 9 June – signature of the Convention for the Extension of Hong Kong Territory with Qing dynasty China leasing Hong Kong for 99 years.
- 14 June – treaty with France establishes borders between French colonies and Nigeria and the Gold Coast.
- 16 June – Folk-Song Society founded.
- 23 June – Royal Army Medical Corps formed within the British Army.
- 6 July – Guglielmo Marconi conducts a test radio telegraph transmission for Lloyd's between Ballycastle, County Antrim, and Rathlin Island, Ireland.
- 19 July – French novelist Émile Zola arrives in London to escape imprisonment for criminal libel over his open letter J'Accuse...! on the Dreyfus affair.
- 12 August
  - The Criminal Evidence Act permits defendants in English law to give sworn evidence and removes spousal privilege in many instances.
  - Prison Act moves towards a more humane penal regime, e.g. abolishing use of the penal treadmill.
  - Inebriates Act permits inebriates to be admitted to reformatories for up to 3 years if convicted of drunkenness 4 times in one year. It is largely ineffective as few reformatories are established. Of those who are committed, more than 80% are women.
  - Elected county and district councils are established in Ireland.
- 23 August – the Southern Cross Expedition, the first British venture of the Heroic Age of Antarctic Exploration, sets sail from London.
- September – French army officer Ferdinand Walsin Esterhazy, the actual culprit in the Dreyfus affair, flees from France to England, where he will spend the remainder of his life. In interviews with Rachel Beer of The Observer newspaper he admits his treachery.
- 2 September – Mahdist War: at the Battle of Omdurman, British and Egyptian troops led by Horatio Kitchener defeat Sudanese tribesmen led by Khalifa Abdullah al-Taashi, thus establishing British dominance in the Sudan. During the battle, the 21st Lancers make what will be the last British cavalry charge and win three VCs. There are 47 deaths among the British and their allies (28 British) and at least 9,700 amongst their opponents.
- 3 September – Southampton F.C. move into their new stadium, The Dell and Nottingham Forest F.C. move into their new City Ground.
- 10 September – Sunderland A.F.C. move into their new stadium at Roker Park.
- 18 September – Fashoda Incident: A powerful flotilla of British gunboats arrives at the French-occupied fort of Fashoda on the White Nile, leading to a diplomatic stalemate until French troops are ordered to withdraw on 3 November.
- 14 October – Atlantic Transport Line's SS Mohegan sinks on The Manacles off Cornwall with the loss of 106 of the 197 on board.
- 16 November – Harrods department store in Knightsbridge install the first (stepless) escalator in the UK.

=== Undated ===
- Edward William Barton-Wright introduces Japanese martial arts to Europe, a form of jujitsu which he calls Bartitsu.
- The North Petherton Rosco Acetylene Company in Somerset may have provided gas lighting for a church.
- J. G. Palmer is established as a newspaper wholesaler in Kent.

== Publications ==
- J. Meade Falkner's children's adventure Moonfleet.
- Thomas Hardy's collection Wessex Poems and Other Verses.
- Maurice Hewlett's historical novel Forest Lovers.
- Ebenezer Howard's tract To-Morrow: A Peaceful Path to Real Reform, influencing the Garden city movement.
- Henry James' gothic horror novella The Turn of the Screw.
- Fred T. Jane's reference work Jane's All the World's Fighting Ships.
- Theodore Watts-Dunton's romantic novel Aylwin.
- H. G. Wells' science fiction novel The War of the Worlds.
- Oscar Wilde's poem The Ballad of Reading Gaol.
- Joseph Wright's English Dialect Dictionary begins publication.

== Births ==
- 9 January – Gracie Fields, singer and comedian (died 1979)
- 23 February – Lucy Morton, Olympic swimmer (died 1980)
- 28 February – Hugh O'Flaherty, Irish Catholic priest (died 1963)
- 10 March – Mary Adams, television producer and social researcher (died 1984)
- 29 March – Cecil Arthur Lewis, WWI fighter ace, broadcasting executive and writer (died 1997)
- 8 April – Maurice Bowra, classical scholar, academic and wit (died 1971)
- 26 April – John Grierson, documentary filmmaker (died 1972)
- 2 May – Henry Hall, bandleader (died 1989)
- 15 May – Tom Wintringham, soldier and politician (died 1949)
- 24 May – Kathleen Hale, children's author (died 2000)
- 6 June – Ninette de Valois, born Edris Stannus, Irish dancer and founder of The Royal Ballet, London (died 2001)
- 15 June – Thomas Armstrong, musician (died 1994)
- 18 June – Carleton Hobbs, actor (died 1978)
- 23 June
  - Lillian Hall-Davis, actress (died 1933)
  - Winifred Holtby, novelist and journalist (died 1935)
- 3 July – Donald Healey, motor engineer and race car driver (died 1988)
- 4 July – Gertrude Lawrence, actress (died 1952)
- 8 July – Alec Waugh, novelist (died 1981)
- 14 July – David Horne, actor (died 1970)
- 28 July – Alice Baker, World War I pilot (died 2006)
- 30 July – Henry Moore, sculptor (died 1986)
- 1 August – Mildred Creak, child psychologist (died 1993)
- 23 August – W. E. Butler, occultist (died 1978)
- 1 September – Violet Carson, actress and entertainer (died 1983)
- 2 September – Arthur Young, actor (died 1959)
- 9 September – Beverley Nichols, author (died 1983)
- 18 October – George Curzon, actor (died 1976)
- 1 November – Philip Ray, actor (died 1978)
- 17 November
  - Harold Bennett, actor (died 1981)
  - Mark Lubbock, composer (died 1986)
- 29 November – C. S. Lewis, author (died 1963)
- 27 December – W. C. Sellar, humorist (died 1951)

== Deaths ==
- 12 January – Sir Joseph Terry, confectioner and politician (born 1828)
- 14 January – Lewis Carroll, children's writer and mathematician (born 1832)
- 16 January – Charles Pelham Villiers, longest-serving MP in the British House of Commons (born 1802)
- 18 January – Henry Liddell, classicist, Dean of Christ Church, Oxford (born 1811)
- 1 March – George Bruce Malleson, officer in India and author (born 1825)
- 15 March – Sir Henry Bessemer, engineer and inventor (born 1813)
- 16 March – Aubrey Beardsley, artist (born 1872)
- 31 March – Eleanor Marx, socialist activist and translator, suicide (born 1855)
- 19 May – William Ewart Gladstone, Prime Minister (born 1809)
- 3 June – Samuel Plimsoll, politician and social reformer (born 1824)
- 17 June – Sir Edward Burne-Jones, painter and designer (born 1833)
- 14 July – Eliza Lynn Linton, novelist and journalist (born 1822)
- 28 September – Thomas Gee, Welsh non-Conformist preacher publisher (born 1815)
- 2 November – George Goyder, surveyor-general of South Australia (born 1826)
- 20 November – Sir John Fowler, 1st Baronet, civil engineer (born 1817)
- 17 December – Jane Cakebread, inebriate (born 1827/8)

== See also ==
- List of British films before 1920
