= Thomas Holmes (missionary) =

Thomas Holmes (25 January 1846 – 26 March 1918) was a British police-court missionary, philanthropist, author and, upon retirement, secretary of the Howard Association (now the Howard League for Penal Reform). His career as a missionary made him "a well-known figure, universally respected", in particular his interventions and friendship with the notorious Jane Cakebread. He wrote several books on criminology and London's "criminal underworld".

From the age of twelve to thirty-three, he was an iron-moulder like his father; a serious accident in 1877 forced him to find a less physical job. His friends advised him in 1885 to apply for the role of police-court missionary in Lambeth, and he was appointed. In 1889 he was transferred to North London police court.

== Career as a police-court missionary ==
Police-court missionaries were the fore-runner to probation officers, as their initial function was to "reclaim drunkards" and subsequently other offenders too. This developed into a system of releasing offenders on the condition that they would stay in touch with the missionary and accept their guidance. Police-court missionaries were managed by voluntary societies such as the Church of England Temperance Society, who would appoint missionaries to the London Police Courts, until the National Probation Service was set up in 1907.

Holmes worked as a missionary for twenty years, and dealt with thieves, drunkards, prostitutes, and other criminals. He wrote extensively about his experiences in Pictures and Problems From London Police Courts (1900), including his first day attending the police court and the extensive suffering on display:

Even as I sit and write, it is all before me and around. I hear again the horrible speech and diverse tongues. I hear the accents of sorrow and the burst of angry sound. I hear the devil-may-care laugh and the contemptuous expression. I hear the sighs and groans and bitter plaints. I see men shorn of all glory. I see womanhood clothed in shame. I see Vice rampant. I see Misery crawling.

He recalls that he went into Kennington Park, sat down and "cried like a child" at the end of his first day. He also discusses the instructions he was given by his employer, which he felt were inadequate in their focus on religious and moral deliverance:

'Rescue them,' said my employers, 'and the last day of every month a small cheque shall be your reward.' 'How am I to do it?' 'Here's a temperance pledge-book; take pledges.' 'But there are others.' 'Give them tracts.' 'But there are the hungry and homeless to feed.' 'Give them tracts.' 'But there are the poor wantons.' 'Take them to rescue homes, and let them work out their own salvation at the wash-tubs.'

However, he eventually adjusted and found that, in the procession of offenders through the court, "a field for the study of human nature is opened up, and nowhere in the wide world is there a field equal to it". There was opportunity to study "the drink question", "the social evil", the "causes of crime"; "every phase of every social problem has its place here".

== Friendship with Jane Cakebread ==
Jane Cakebread (1827/1828 – 17 December 1898) was a homeless woman notorious for her frequent arrests for public drunkenness; she appeared in court 277 times, and is credited for inspiring the Inebriates Act 1898. Holmes staged many interventions for her, providing her with clothes and money for accommodation, and she would frequently attempt to go see him whenever she was discharged from prison. Cakebread told Holmes he could inherit her (non-existent) fortune, and once proposed to him; her prized possessions were the clothes he gave her.

Their relationship has been described as "a kind of love story, a moving account of a professional relationship that became a strange friendship." Holmes described their relationship as such:

Fifty years I stood by and stood up for Jane Cakebread, and we became inseparably connected. She abused me right royally and her power of invective was superb. When she was not in prison she haunted my house and annoyed my neighbours.

== Later life ==
Holmes retired from police court work in 1905 and became secretary of the Howard Association (now the Howard League for Penal Reform), a pressure group dedicated to reform of prisons and criminal law. He worked there for ten years and provided advice to successive Home Secretaries on prison reform. As secretary, he built up a relationship between the Howard Association and the Prisons Department at the Home Office by extensively quoting and interpreting the annual reports of the Prison Commissioners in the Association reports. Arthur Gardner praised his tenure as secretary, comparing him to his predecessor Edward Grubb: "He had the same quiet faith as his predecessor, but the former's righteous anger was replaced by that understanding which converts anger into pity. A better secretary for the Howard Association could not have been found..."

In his studies London's Underworld (1912) and Psychology and Crime (1912), he pushed an environmental analysis of crime, arguing that criminals are not 'born' but created through wealth inequality, unemployment and bad housing. In 1910 he was sent to the United States as the British representative at the Penological Congress.

In 1904 he founded the Home Workers' Aid Association, which aimed to improve the working conditions of unregulated labour such as costume-sewing and artificial flower-making, which were usually done by women working up to sixteen hours a day for less than two shillings. The association provided women with annual holidays and recreational facilities.

In 1910 he set up Singholm, a guest house in Walton-on-the-Naze, where forty women at a time could relax during their fortnight's holiday. He spent much of his own time there. The house later became known as Singholm Auxiliary Hospital when it was taken over by the British Red Cross for use during World War I, then returned to the ownership of the Association, but improved social conditions and employment of women outside of the home meant there was less need for a worker's holiday house.

He died of heart failure on 26 March 1918 in London, nearly a year after his wife of forty-five years passed.

== Selected works ==
- Pictures and Problems From London Police Courts (1900).
- Known to the Police (1908).
- London's Underworld (1912).
- Psychology and Crime (1912).
