= Jane Cakebread =

British parlourmaid; inebriate; subject of medical enquiry (1830–1898)

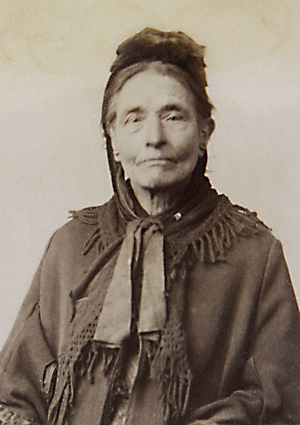
- in 1895
- Born: 1827 or 1828; Hertfordshire, England
- Died: 17 December 1898; Claybury Asylum, Woodford Bridge, London
- Occupation: Parlour-maid
- Known for: The Inebriates Act 1898 was due to her case.

Jane Cakebread (1827 or 1828 – 17 December 1898) was a 19th-century British homeless woman who gained notoriety for her frequent arrests for public "drunkenness". According to official records, Cakebread appeared in police court 277 times for her behaviour in public. She was believed to have set a record for number of court appearances, as well as number of newspaper paragraphs devoted to a woman during the reign of Queen Victoria, besides the queen herself. By the time of her death, she had achieved international notoriety, as both The London Telegraph and The New York Times claimed in her obituary that she had been "convicted 281 times". Cakebread had mental illness, alcohol intoxication, cirrhosis of the liver, and visual impairment. She lived the final three years of her life at Claybury Asylum in London, where she was placed under medical observation. Her tragic case focused public attention on the ineffectiveness of the policy of dealing with drunkenness through short-term imprisonment. She is often credited for inspiring the Inebriates Act 1898, and other legislation.

== Early life and family ==
Jane Cakebread was born in Sawbridgeworth in the English county of Hertfordshire in 1827 or 1828. (Note: One source says 1830 and according to Crothers (1904), Cakebread was born in 1829.) Her father was a carter and carpenter from Clavering, Essex; her mother was from Sawbridgeworth. The Cakebreads were a family of five sons and three daughters. She was the eldest daughter of Susan and James Cakebread to survive to adulthood. Her family was poor. According to Dr. Robert Armstrong-Jones, there was no record of mental illness or alcoholism in her immediate family.

She received some education, and is said to have been "clearly intelligent and articulate", with "a capital memory" for certain parts of the Bible. She had a brother living in the countryside whom she once stayed with for six months, when police court missionary Thomas Holmes was trying to get her off the streets of London.

== Career ==
Cakebread herself said that she had worked as "a single-handed parlour maid". As of 1851, she was a domestic servant in Newport, Essex. In 1861, she was employed by Charles Friend Hardy, who worked at the London Stock Exchange, and lived in Stoke Newington, North London.

She probably stopped working to support herself by the time she was forty. The 1871 census reported that she was unemployed and lodging in Tottenham. By 1881, the census found her in a prison cell at the Upper Street police station in Islington. According to Holmes, one of her employers left her an inheritance of £100, which had been her "undoing" and caused her to stop working. Until the end of her life, she had delusions of grandeur, constantly repeating that she was a member of the "high nobility of Bishop Stortford" and entitled to a fortune. Taking great pride in her belief that she was "a lady of high character", she was never idle, but showed no interest in earning a living.

== Street life ==
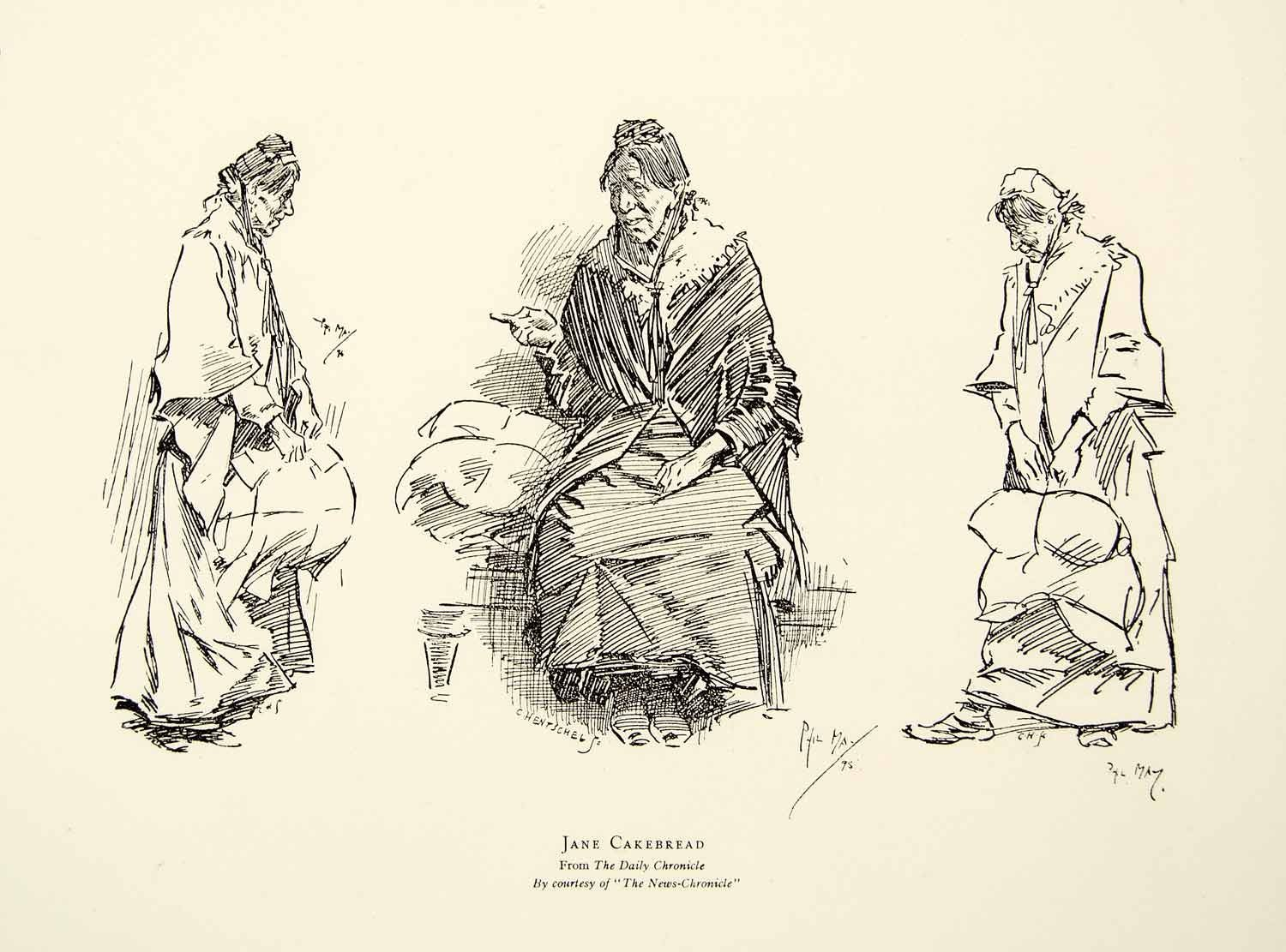
Jane Cakebread by Phil May

At some point, Jane Cakebread started living on the streets, possibly after she had squandered her windfall or had been robbed. This led to her first appearances in London police courts charged with being "drunk and disorderly".

For more than fifteen years, Cakebread was a familiar figure on Worship Street, Clerkenwell, and in the North London police courts. Homeless and penniless, she was arrested frequently, and her life became an endless cycle from police court to prison, from prison to the streets, and then back to court. A recent biographical account states that she appeared in court 277 times, while her widely cited obituary claimed that she had been "convicted" 281 times.

Medical lobbyists and moral reformers during this period drew attention to the case of Jane Cakebread to show that legislation in the 1870s and 1880s had failed to help the "poor, mainly female, inebriates" who appeared before the courts often, and "represented a growing public scandal."

=== Homelessness ===
In the weeks when Cakebread was out of jail, she stayed outdoors all day and night, unless Holmes was able to find shelter for her. Toward the end of her life, he struggled to find anyone willing to take her in, regardless of how much he was willing to pay. During the great frost of 1895, for nine weeks, Cakebread slept outdoors using a bed made from a bundle of sticks, and she washed in the icy River Lea. She was "defiant" about the cold weather, and liked to say, "Ladies always wash in cold water." She was completely sober during this time.

"Miss Cakebread", as she called herself, or "Jane", was regularly baited by boys in the street. She had memorised chapters of the Bible, including one from the Book of Job concerning the uncertainty of human life, which she often recited when quarrels broke out. Her prized possessions were three brown-paper parcels which she carried at all times, containing ten years' worth of clothing which Holmes had given to her. She took very good care of her teeth, using brick dust which she ground up herself as "tooth-powder".

=== Alcohol usage ===
Despite her reputation as an "inebriate" who was constantly drinking, in reality, Jane Cakebread was classified as a "periodic drinker". She drank alcohol only in small quantities. She went for long stretches of time without liquor; she craved it only intermittently and sometimes refused it. She did, however, have an extreme reaction to small quantities of alcohol, and was given drinks by people who knew her who wanted to "hear her talk and see the fireworks". The sale and procurement of liquor for "habitual drunkards" and "drunken people" was made illegal after Cakebread's death, when the Licensing Act 1902 was enacted by Parliament.

=== Interactions with the police and magistrate ===
Cakebread willingly gave herself up to police custody on a regular basis. She frequently chased after the police for protection, or to take her into custody, and they would often flee when they saw her coming. Some even bribed her to leave them alone. When she was unsuccessful, she would lie down and scream "Murder!" and "Police!" The police would then have no choice but to arrest her. Once arrested, she would refuse to move until she was strapped into an ambulance, which she called a "perambulator".

According to Holmes, Jane Cakebread's appearances in court were a highlight in her life. She reveled in the attention she received, and the notoriety that it gave her. In contrast to other women who ended up in the dock, Cakebread took an active interest in the proceedings, and would comment on them loudly "to the amusement and the occasional embarrassment of the court." Holmes wrote:

To hear the hum of amused wonder and scarcely suppressed laughter when 'No. 12, Jane Cakebread, your worship,' was announced by the gaoler was the very breath of life, and proved ample compensation for the discomfort of the cells... When before the magistrate, she was always at her best, and the knowledge that she was sure to be the cause of many paragraphs next day seemed to brace her up for a special effort; and oh the dear delight if she could but make the majesty of the law to unbend, and cause a smile to appear on the magistrate's face! For that smile she would cheerfully 'do' her month. 'Mr. Holmes,' she has said to me many times, 'did you see me make the magistrate laugh?' And in the cells she would hug herself, and fall to her hymns and prayers with rare enjoyment.

On one occasion, the judge discharged her, because she looked well rested, and she was ushered out of court without a chance to speak. Disappointed, the next day, Cakebread made sure the police had more evidence to present on her behalf, so she could interrupt proceedings and have her turn to speak.

Cakebread was frequently imprisoned at Millbank Prison, up to 1890. When Millbank closed, females were received into Holloway Prison. On at least one occasion, she spent one month at Cambridge Gaol.

== Newspaper coverage ==
Jane Cakebread's "courtroom antics" were covered regularly in the police-court columns of newspapers such as The Morning Chronicle, The Pall Mall Gazette, Lloyd's Weekly, and The Illustrated Police News. In the late 1880s, articles about her also appeared in The Morning Post, Reynolds's, The Leeds Mercury, and even The Times. The Daily Chronicle gave "special attention" to her case, and also commissioned the famous sketch of Jane Cakebread by caricaturist Phil May.

She was happy to be "reported" and she enjoyed being known to local police officers. She enjoyed reading news stories about herself being "reported" and this was frequent. She was considered notorious and she had the skill of supplying comments that journalists would quote in their coverage.

== Interventions ==
=== Lady Henry Somerset ===
Lady Henry Somerset opened the Duxhurst Industrial Farm Colony, Reigate in 1895 to rehabilitate alcoholics as part of the temperance movement. She brought Cakebread there to dry out, but Cakebread complained she was "buried alive". At the same time, she wrote letters about living in a beautiful country cottage, where the birds sang, the trees gave a shade, and the breeze blew.

Lady Henry found the recidivist alcoholic to be quarrelsome and spiteful and sent her back to London after three months, despite the negative press coverage for her farm colony that Cakebread's ejection produced. Cakebread returned to sleeping on Stamford Hill, begging and being inebriated.

=== Friendship with Thomas Holmes ===
She was befriended by Thomas Holmes, who was employed by the police courts as their missionary – "a forerunner of the modern probation officer". Their friendship lasted for half a century, and has been described as "a kind of love story, a moving account of a professional relationship that became a strange friendship." At one point, Cakebread proposed marriage to Holmes, who said that "she bestowed her affections on me". Holmes himself wrote:

Fifty years I stood by and stood up for Jane Cakebread, and we became inseparably connected. She abused me right royally and her power of invective was superb. When she was not in prison she haunted my house and annoyed my neighbours.

Cakebread promised Holmes that he could inherit the fortune she never had. Holmes said that when he gave her a change of clothing, she "patronised" him "most graciously".

Cakebread took advantage of the attempts by philanthropists to improve her lifestyle.

== Claybury Asylum ==
When she was arrested on 21 January 1896, she was remanded to Holloway Sanatorium, where she was declared insane.

On 31 January 1896, Cakebread, stated to be 62, but whose real age was older, was admitted into Claybury Asylum from the Hackney Workhouse, having been previously in Holloway Prison. At Claybury she was studied by Robert Armstrong-Jones. While nominally a servant, she was in reality a vagrant who had not been self-supporting for at least 30 years. Her appearance was striking; her manner was at times gracious and condescending.

She was a difficult inmate. She constantly wanted reassurance and would try to impress the doctors by arranging her hair and decorating herself with lace and ribbons trying to gain attention from anyone. She thought herself "a lady" entitled to money, and would pretend to be in charge while at the same time complaining that she was abused by the nurses. Alcohol had affected her memory and she considered herself religious.

== Death and legacy ==
Cakebread died at Claybury Asylum, 17 December 1898, of heart failure, edema and cirrhosis of the liver and kidneys. The Inebriates Act 1898, which called for inebriates to be sent to reformatories rather than prison, was due to her and similar cases. For instance, the British Medical Journal highlighted both the large number of times Cakebread had appeared before the courts and an incident where she was jailed for a month for disturbing the peace on the same day as she had been released from a month's imprisonment to support calls for "the involuntary internment of inebriates" in order to "protect the community and the wretched victims themselves from the domination of a disease which so effaces womanhood". The Inebriates Act 1898 was mainly focused on women, and they represented more than 90 percent of the people sent to reformatories for drunkenness.

In 1904 her previous doctor, Robert Armstrong-Jones, published "The Psychology of Jane Cakebread" in the Journal of Mental Science.

The 1924 edition of the Standard Encyclopedia of the Alcohol Problem: Volume Two includes her notorious case and photograph noting how her record led to a change in the law which had previously just sent inebriates to prison.
