= Duxhurst Industrial Farm Colony =

Residential institution in Surrey, England

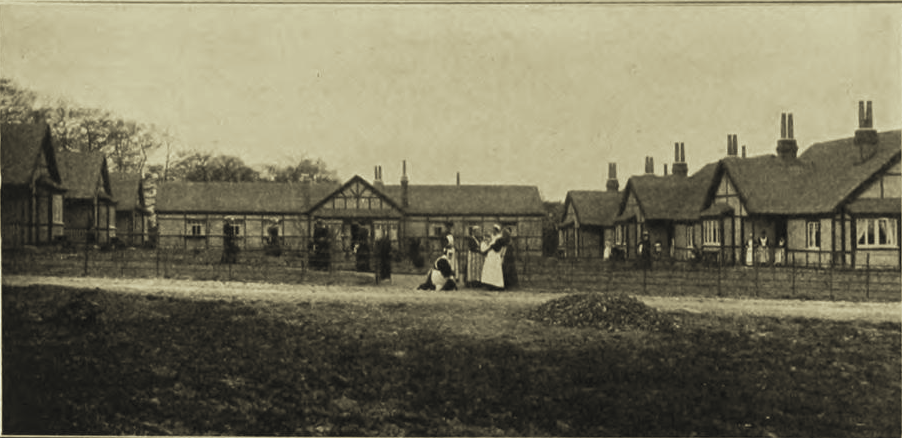
- Motto: "To comfort and help the weak-hearted, and to raise up them that fall."
- Founder: Lady Henry Somerset
- Established: 1895
- Mission: treatment and cure of habitual alcoholics
- Focus: women
- Location: Duxhurst, near Reigate, Surrey, England
- Dissolved: 1922
- Funded by: Lady Henry; National British Women's Temperance Association; World's Woman's Christian Temperance Union

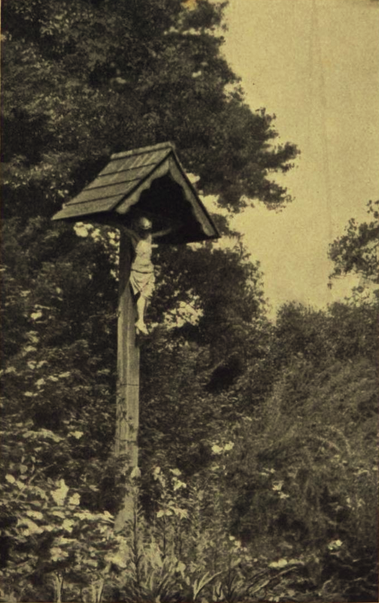
The Calvary

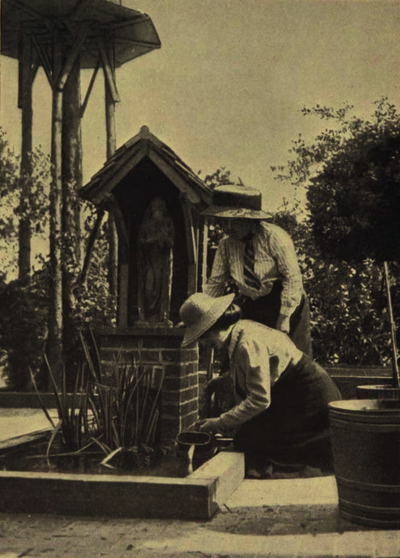
The well

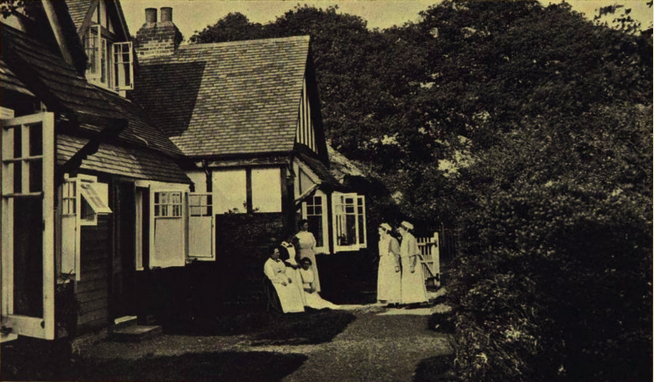
Hospital gate

Duxhurst Industrial Farm Colony (Lady Henry Somerset Homes from 1922; Princess Marie Louise Village for Gentlefolk from 1923) was a British voluntary in-patient residential institution for the treatment and cure of habitual alcoholic women. It was founded in 1895 at Duxhurst, near Reigate, Surrey, England, by Lady Henry Somerset. Lady Henry was the first woman in England to pay attention to the inebriety of women, and she founded, at Duxhurst, the first industrial farm colony for alcoholic women. Using gender-specific religious treatment, Duxhurst was the largest of the retreat institutions in England in its day. It was funded by Lady Henry with contributions from the National British Women's Temperance Association (BWTA) and the World's Woman's Christian Temperance Union (WCTU).

The colony combined the work of a retreat, under the Habitual Drunkards Act 1879 (42 & 43 Vict. c. 19), with that of a reformatory for selected cases. The experience of this colony proved that "committed" cases are usually of a type so much inferior to the "voluntary" cases that it is impossible to maintain efficient control and secure good results when they are mixed. Early in 1903, however, owing to pressure from the National Society for the Prevention of Cruelty to Children, the managers decided to admit selected cases committed under section 1 of the act for drunkenness and consequent neglect of children, the National Society undertaking to make full investigation respecting the moral character and general suitability of proposed cases.

With regard to employment, Duxhurst made a successful attempt at the steady occupation of its inmates. All cleaning and laundry work necessary for the proper conduct of the colony was done by its patients, but in addition to this, some regular industries were provided, to the educational advantage of patients and to the financial advantage of the institution. Much importance was rightly directed to garden work, which occupied many inmates in open air and under glass; they helped in fruit culture and in the subsequent picking and despatch for market; they assisted in the care of bees and in the management of poultry, and they were employed in seed sorting and the like. Dairy work also provided occupation for others. But the most interesting part of the colony was the workroom with its spinning-wheels and hand looms. Here many different forms of textile fabrics were woven with fine finish. Rug-making was a special feature, and all sorts of delicate embroidery and fancy work was made for public sale.

Documenting the work done at Duxhurst, including statistics, anecdotes and photographs, Lady Henry published Beauty for ashes (London, L. Upcott Gill & Son) in 1913. After her death in 1921, the site became repurposed. By the 1960s, all of the buildings were demolished.

== Origin ==
Many years before its inception, the attention of the BWTA was aroused to the fact of the alarming increase of inebriety among women. At one time in England, alcohol intoxication was punishable by imprisonment only. As it was considered by some to be too severe a penalty, various individuals attempted to remedy this arrangement by urging that drunkenness be prevented instead of punished. It was felt that the system of short penal sentences had the effect of sending inebriate women back to the life they had before. It was realised that they had to combat an issue that was not only moral but also physical, and that therefore, it was necessary to provide physical as well as moral remedies.

Profoundly impressed by the methods advocated by Frances Willard, Lady Henry made a special journey to the U.S. with her son, with the object of making her acquaintance. The two women became intimate friends. In 1890, Dr. Mary T. Greene received her medical degree from the University of Michigan. For the next six months, Dr. Greene was an intern in the hospital of Sherborn Reformatory Prison for Women, in South Framingham, Massachusetts. This state institution, the second of its kind to be established in the U.S., was officered entirely by women and accommodated 600. A visit to this prison, on the initiative of Willard, gave Lady Henry the inspiration to found Duxhurst on her estate, a model reformatory for women inebriates in England.

== Early history ==
After careful study of the subject, the BWTA, under the leadership of their president, Lady Henry Somerset, lifelong friend of Frances Willard, started in 1895 at Duxhurst, in Surrey, an industrial farm colony for inebriates, on lines which they believed to be sound and scientific, and which they hoped would make a sort of object lesson for the State. Lady Henry hoped to prove that there was a more reasonable and humane method of treatment. The success of the colony, which was the first institution of its kind to be opened in England for women, was extremely rapid from the day of its inauguration, and the outcome of the experiment was largely responsible for the passage of the Inebriates Act 1898 amendment to the Habitual Drunkards Act 1879, which amendment provided for the commitment of alcoholics to private institutions.

After the colony opened, Lady Henry brought Jane Cakebread there to dry out, but Cakebread complained, while at the same time, she wrote letters about living in a beautiful country cottage, where the birds sang, the trees gave a shade, and the breeze blew. Lady Henry found the recidivist alcoholic to be quarrelsome and spiteful and sent her back to London after three months, despite the negative press coverage for her farm colony that Cakebread's ejection produced.

In 1897, the village could accommodate fewer than 50 patients. The year before, 3,000 applications for admission were refused. The majority of the patients were not criminals, but alcoholism had desolated their homes. In 1900, it was reported that the colony expenses totaled £4,000 a year.

In 1901, the cost in money of each patient worked out at about nineteen shillings a week—a sum that favourably compares with the cost per head of patients in other institutions of the class in that era. But it was a sum quite beyond the means of the women who come to be helped. From five to twelve shillings a week is what most of the "villagers" paid. A few obtained slight privileges, and paid as much as fifteen. The rest of the money had to be made up out of the contributions of the public.

== Twentieth century ==
Though Duxhurst Farm Colony operated as an alcohol recovery home for several years, it was not licensed as a retreat until 1901, and, consequently, till that time, was not authorised to receive patients signing under the Habitual Drunkards Act 1879. In that year, this institution combined the work of a retreat under the Habitual Drunkards Act 1879 with that of a reformatory for selected cases under the Inebriates Act 1898 (61 & 62 Vict. c. 60). Its main object was retreat work, for which it was specially adapted. The reformatory section was added later, on the assumption that both classes could be received and treated in the same institution and thereby increase its value. When the reformatory section was first started, it was opened for the reception of cases sent from London courts under section 2 of the act, the managers reserving the right to select or refuse any case which they considered fit or unfit, as the evidence supplied by courts appeared to indicate. But this means of selection proved futile; it was found that committed cases were of a type so much below what was anticipated, and were so inferior to the voluntary cases admitted as retreat inmates, that their presence interfered with the main work of the institution. The reception of such committals was therefore discontinued, with the result that at the end of 1902, none remained under detention.

Early in 1903, however, owing to pressure from the National Society for the Prevention of Cruelty to Children (NSPCC), the managers were induced to start on other lines, and recommence their reformatory work by restricting admissions to cases committed under section 1 of the act, for drunkenness and consequent neglect of children. The NSPCC undertook to make full enquiry as to the moral character and general suitability of proposed inmates before recommending their admission. This amended scheme worked well, and in its day, was the only instance where selection before admission proved in any way satisfactory. This was accounted for by the fact that the agents of the society had exceptional means of obtaining information concerning the private life and circumstances of individual inmates.

Fifteen inmates were admitted to Duxhurst under these conditions during 1903, and none were discharged. The general circumstances under which they suffered detention were ideal in every respect, their life being made as home-like as possible. But it must be remembered, owing to the exceptional means by which these inmates were selected, that Duxhurst was dealing with the best of reformatory work, and was able to do, with mild measures, what proved impossible in other places where committals were indiscriminate in character.

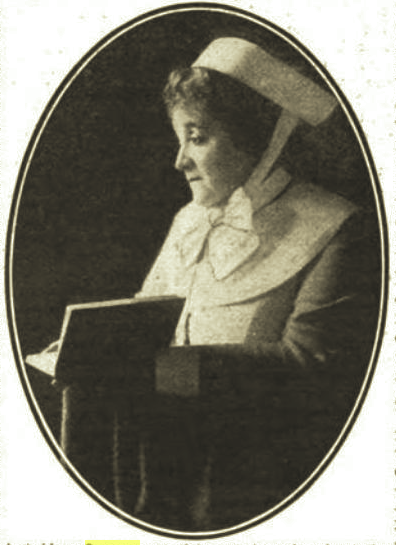
Lady Henry, in nurse uniform (Duxhurst, 1912)

Lady Somserset announced in 1907 that she intended to devote herself almost exclusively to charitable work, and would live mostly at her cottage on Duxhurst Industrial Farm Colony. When staying at Duxhurst, she wore a white cap and nurse's dress and apron, the uniform of the staff.

It was doing very well by then, numbering altogether 130 people, including 27 children from the NSPCC.

In 1915, there was a soldiers' hospital at Duxhurst.

Lady Henry died in 1921. In 1922, it was decided to change the title of the Colony to "Lady Henry Somerset Homes", in memory of the founder. In October 1923, in was named "Princess Marie Louise Village for Gentlefolk", after Princess Marie Louise of Schleswig-Holstein and became a home for poor women.

By 1926, it was estimated that approximately 70 per cent of the cures were permanent. This figure, however, included all of the cases received, such as the insane, those unfit for active treatment, and those received in a dying condition.

In 1931, the Anglo-Catholic's society of Holy Family Homes incorporated the Lady Henry Somerset Homes to provide housing for children. The site was for sale by auction in 1936, and was purchased in 1938 for use by the Alexandra Orphanage. During World War II, it was used as a military training centre as well as a prisoner-of-war camp for Italian prisoners. Thereafter, the structures were demolished in stages, all of them being gone by the 1960s.

== Location ==
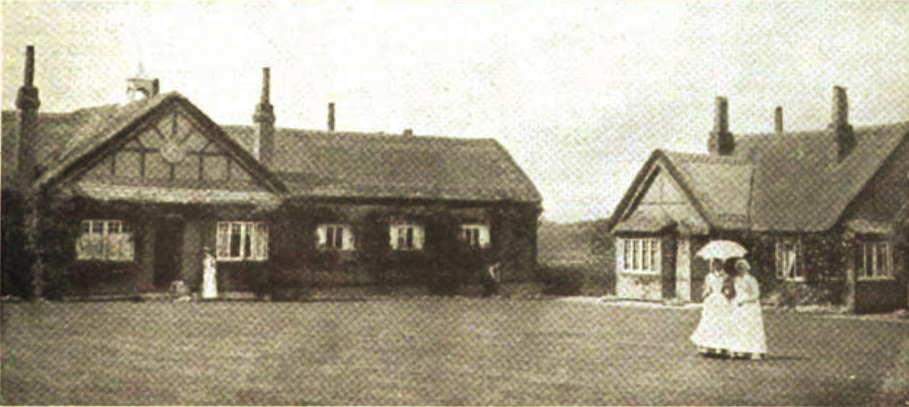
Hospital and some cottages

Duxhurst was located about 30 miles (48 km) from London and 4 miles (6.4 km) from Lady Henry's home at the Reigate Priory. It was also about 4 miles (6.4 km) from Reigate railway station by road. Constructed as a model industrial farm village, it was a home and reformatory for inebriate women. The site, a farm of 180 acres (73 ha), was situated in a green plateau surrounded by the ridge of the Surrey hills.

The "Village" consisted of home-like cottages grouped round an open quadrangle with a small church adjacent, and, at a short distance, the superintendent's cottage and the chaplain's lodge. The Village contained work rooms, farm buildings, a hospital, a church, and a hall.

== Architecture and fittings ==
=== Cottages ===
There were originally six cottages. By 1900, two more were added, one by the voluntary subscription of sailors ("Royal Navy")), the other by the town of Hastings ("Hastings"). Yet another, "Louth", was added by 1910.

Some of the cottages were situated around a central green, forming three sides of a square, with gardens in the centre. Others were scattered over the estate. The cottages were well built and simply furnished. Of English Gothic architectural style, they were one-storeyed with thatched roofs of rush. Each was artistically painted and decorated, inside and out. Each small dwelling was complete in itself, with kitchen, sitting rooms, and bedrooms, as well as a nurses' sitting-bedroom.

The cost of each cottage was approximately £350 (US$1,750), and each structure was named by or after the donor. Various branches of the BWTA contributed funds for the construction of additional cottages. One of the brightest cottages was given by the sailors of the Royal Navy, called the Agnes Weston Royal Navy Cottage.

=== Lady Henry's cottage ===
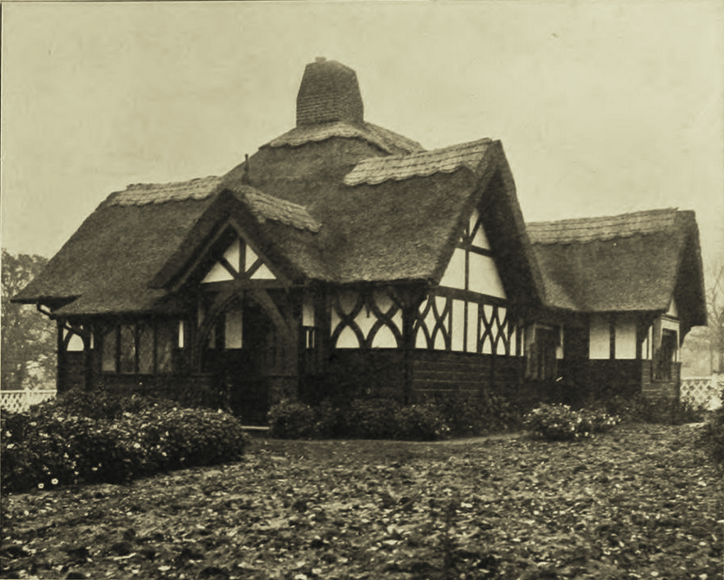
Lady Henry's cottage

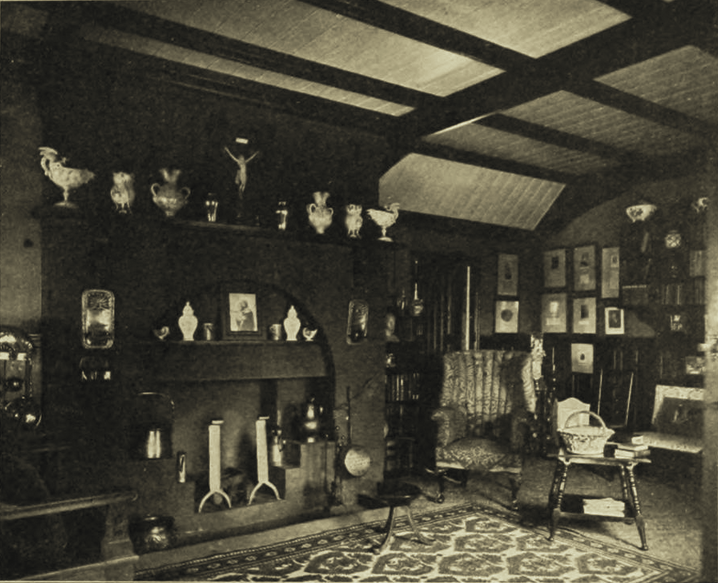
Interior, Lady Henry's cottage

Lady Henry's cottage was built by Butler & Paul, cottage house decorators of Norwich, in accordance with Lady Henry's ideas. The cottage was approached by a white wicket gate, opening on to an old-fashioned red-tiled path, lined on either side with bright flower borders. It was one story high, and was thatched with reeds from the Norfolk Broads. The entrance was from a Gothic porch, with seats on either side, and a lantern swinging from the roof. The simple wood door is opened by a latch. Straight away was the chief apartment of the cottage, a long, low room, which extended the full width of the building. The ceiling was white, with beams of oak. The floor was covered with matting, relieved by colored rugs. There were several small diamond-paned windows, with deep windowsills, whereon stood pots of musk, fuchsias and geraniums. The curtains were white spotted muslin. A grandfather clock stood in the corner and by the red-brick open fireplace, with andirons, stood the high-backed seat upon which three people could sit. The fireside seat was made out of some pieces of old wood carving which Lady Henry had picked up. The open fireplace was copied from a New England design, which Lady Henry saw at Willard's cottage in the Catskill Mountains. A set of brasses stood about the hearth, and an old brass warming pan hung by the side.

The furniture of the room was very simple. The chairs had rush-bottomed seats and high backs. The sofas and lounges were covered with William Morris's blue art chintz. There was a carved sideboard, in shape something like a kitchen dresser, with crockery shelves above, which Lady Henry brought from Brittany. The old blue China dinner service which stood upon it was purchased in Boston. It was real Chinese ware, and was probably brought to Boston by traders. It was not kept for ornament, and was always used by Lady Henry. Simply framed pictures and portraits hung upon the walls, and one corner was devoted to portraits which were presented to Lady Henry during her tour in the U.S. There hangs Whittier and Holmes, Mary Wilkins, Neal Dow, Abraham Lincoln, Julia Ward Howe, Harriet beecher Stowe, and Frances Willard and her mother. Several of the pictures had autograph inscriptions beneath them, and that of Whittier had a piece of maple from his garden framed in along with it.

The principal bedroom was brightly but simply furnished, the prevailing colors being white and pink. White painted wood fitments were fixed in two corners of the room which served to hold her toilet requisites. Further was a maid's bedroom. The remainder of the back portion of the cottage contained kitchen, pantry, servant's bedroom, and visitor's room. The prevailing woodwork of the cottage walls were plain boards, clear varnished in green, a very inexpensive, artistic, and clean style of decoration.

=== Manor house ===
Far up the road, in its own grounds, was the Manor House, which was opened for the reception of patients able to pay a larger fee. The surplus income derived from the higher fees charged for residence in this part of the retreat went far towards assisting the poorer patients received into the "Village". The gardens beyond the Manor House were managed by a professional woman gardener.

=== "The Nest" ===
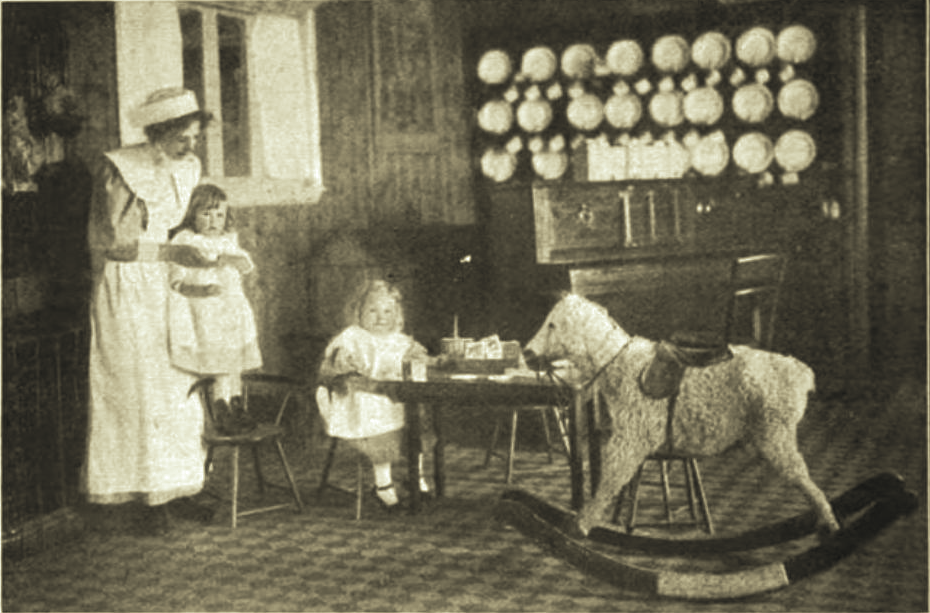
The Nest (1912)

Babies were admitted with their mothers, and a holiday home for children on the estate became a source of interest to the initial patients. Hence, in order to care for the children of the residents, one of the buildings was fitted up for them, and was called "The "Nest".

There were women consigned to the colony by the courts who were convicted of neglect of their children through drunkenness or other misdemeanors and who were sentenced to a detention which sometimes lasted three years. It meant that the child, instead of drifting into the slums, would be cared for during the years that its mother was learning new ways and entering a new life.

In 1920, "The Nest" was completely destroyed by fire, and, as the amount of insurance received was quite inadequate to cover the rebuilding, it was decided to turn the manor house into a new Nest. This reconstructed building remained as a memorial to the founder, Lady Henry Somerset, and to her sister, Adeline Marie Russell, Duchess of Bedford. The house stood in ample grounds, and a public elementary school was within the bounds of the Colony, at which the children, numbering about 50 in 1922, were taught.

=== Hall ===
There was a large dining and recreation hall, where entertainments and classes were held every evening. All meals but tea were taken in the dining room by the nurses and cottage patients. The central hall, built in the same rustic style as the cottages, was named after Willard; a portrait of Willard occupied an honoured place.

=== Church of St. Mary and the Angels ===
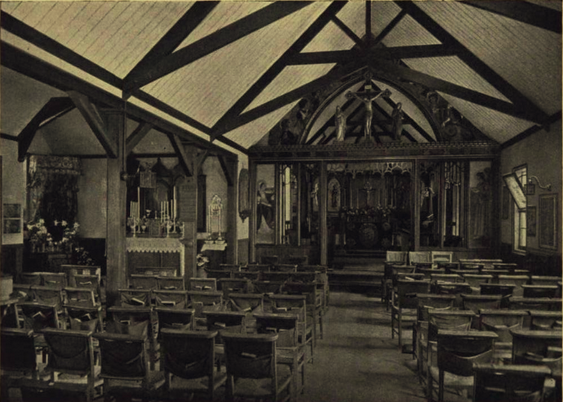
Church of St. Mary and the Angels, Duxhurst

Lady Henry relied on the chaplain and the teaching of the church to show the women the way out of fear. The chapel at Duxhurst had been built in the days when her sympathy was with the evangelical school, but the chapel changed its tone and its appearance as she herself had slowly gone back to the preference of her youth for St Paul's Church, Brighton. It was replete with gaily coloured walls, pictures, statues, lamps burning, a side chapel, flowers, candles, incense, beautiful vestments, and a confessional that may have been like no other in England in that era. Services at the chapel were often conducted by Lady Henry herself.

Lady Henry's instinct was right. The women loved the chapel. It was unlike anything they had seen before and had none of the associations bound up in their minds with the Church of England. Hardly at any time of the day was it empty; somewhere within its shelter, a woman would be found kneeling or sitting quietly looking around at everything.

== Daily life ==
"We endeavor as far as possible to make every woman who comes to the home take up some occupation in which she has not been engaged before. I lay great stress on this. It breaks off continuity with the past, it gives to the women a new idea, and it absorbs them in occupations which have no associations." (Lady Henry Somerset, 1914)

Each cottage was under the supervision of a young woman who has received special religious and medical training for her work, and the whole were supervised by an able and experienced woman. The women took their meals together, and met daily in the recreation hall where exercises were arranged. They attended temperance and gospel meetings every week. There was one rule: if a woman left the retreat, she was not allowed to come back.

In each cottage, six patients lived together under the charge of a nursing sister. They were carefully selected and grouped together, and lived quietly and naturally, not the ordinary life of an institution. The diet was good and plentiful. The duration of detention in the institution was usually for one year, as it has been proved that permanent cures could not be effected in much less than that time.

There were three classes of patients treated at the Colony: those who come of their own volition and who were able to pay in part for their accommodations; those who are wealthy enough to bear all of their expenses and who were housed in separate cottages; and those habitual inebriates who were committed to the Colony by the order of a magistrate under the provisions of the amendment to the Habitual Drunkards Act 1879.

The patients' daily work was carried on under medical advice in the open air. Flower and fruit raising in the open and under glass, seed growing, poultry and beekeeping, dairy work and fruit preserving, were carried on. The patients were paid for their work.

All of the domestic work done in and around the cottages was handled by the patients. Looms were installed on which fancy aprons, linens, and woolen dress materials could be woven. Approximately 112 cases were handled during the first two years, 55 of which were discharged at the end of that time apparently cured. At the time of the death of Lady Henry Somerset (April 1921) the colony had grown considerably, and her project had accomplished remarkable results along the line of influencing the promotion of temperance and women's work in England.

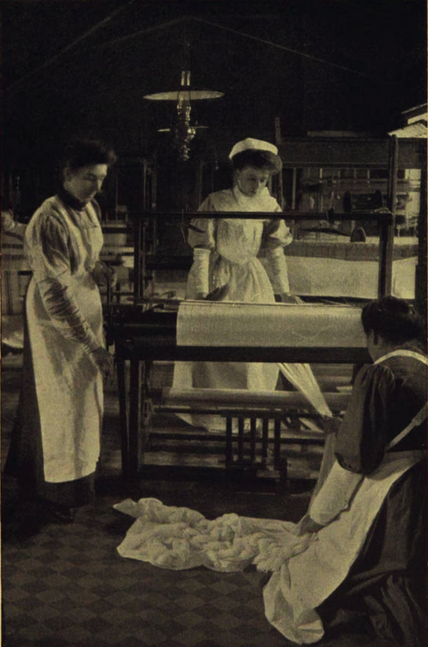
Linen looms

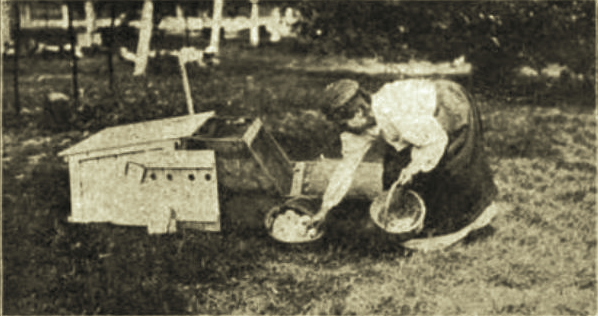
Raising chickens

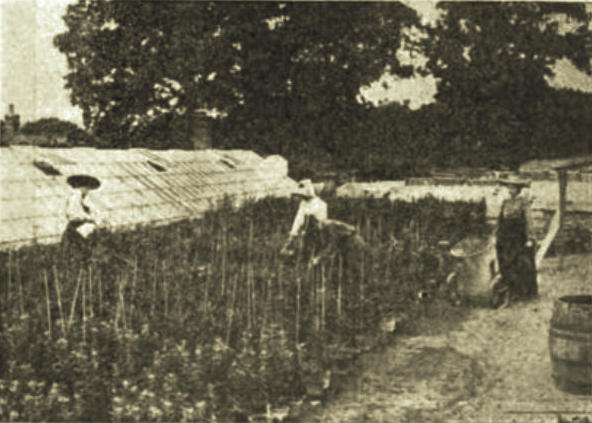
Tending the garden

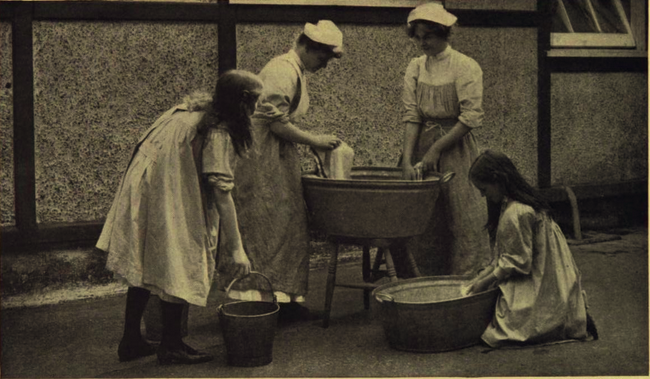
Washing clothes

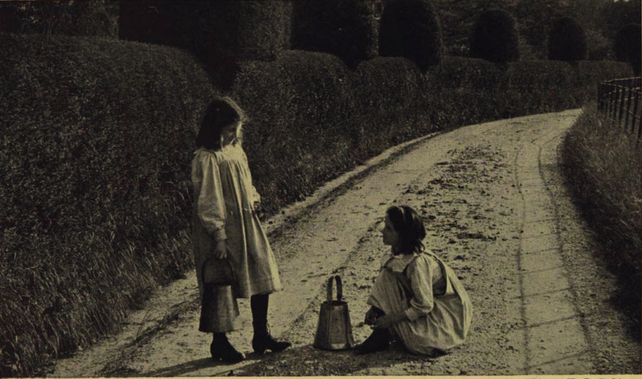
Fetching milk

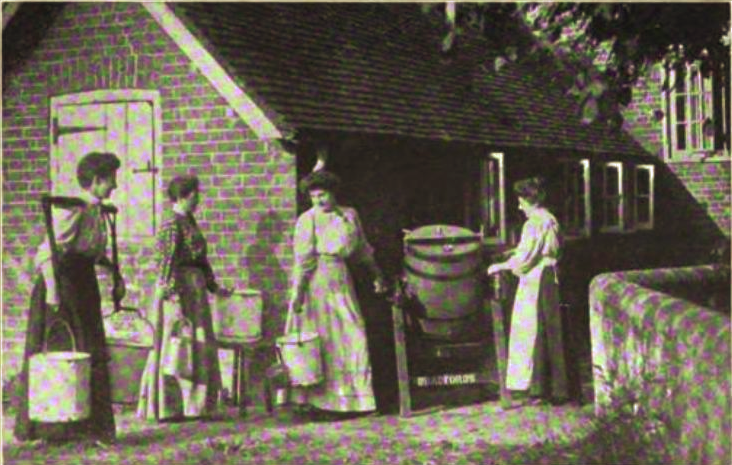
Dairy work

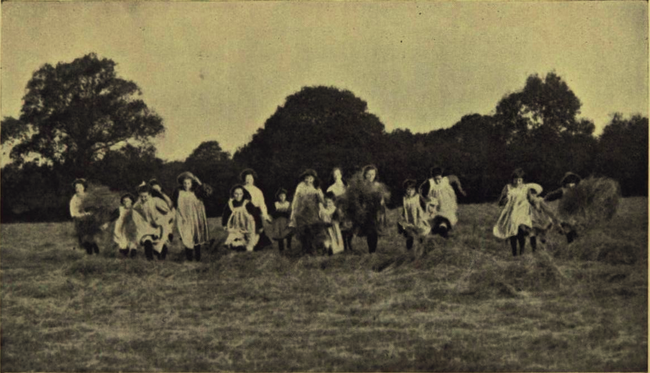
In the hay field
