= List of London workhouses =

This is a list of workhouses in London. In 1776 there were 86 workhouses in the metropolis plus about 12 pauper farms in Hoxton and Mile End

- Aldgate workhouse
- Bethnal Green workhouse
- Bow workhouse
- Camberwell workhouse
- Chelsea workhouse
- Christchurch workhouse
- City of London workhouse
- Clapham workhouse
- Clerkenwell workhouse
- Cripplegate workhouse
- Forest Gate workhouse
- Fulham workhouse
- Greenwich workhouse
- Hackney workhouse
- Hampstead workhouse
- Hanwell workhouse
- Holborn workhouse
- Islington workhouse
- Kensington workhouse
- Lambeth workhouse
- Lewisham workhouse
- Mile End Old Town workhouse
- Newington workhouse
- Poplar workhouse
- Saffron Hill workhouse
- Shoreditch workhouse
- Southwark workhouse
- St Andrew, Holborn workhouse
- St Ann's, Limehouse workhouse
- St George in the East workhouse
- St George, Hanover Square workhouse
- St George-the-Martyr workhouse
- St Giles & St George workhouse
- St Giles, Cripplegate workhouse
- St Luke workhouse
- St Margaret & St John, Westminster workhouse
- St Martin-in-the-Fields workhouse
- St Marylebone workhouse
- St Olave's Poor Law Union workhouse, Rotherhithe
- St Pancras workhouse
- St Paul, Covent Garden workhouse
- St Saviour's workhouse
- Stepney workhouse
- Strand workhouse
- Tooting workhouse
- Training Ship Goliath workhouse
- Wandsworth and Clapham workhouse
- Wapping workhouse
- West London workhouse
- Westminster workhouse
- Whitechapel workhouse
