= St Luke's Vestry =

Type
- Type: Vestry of the parish of St Luke's

History
- Founded: 1733
- Disbanded: 1900
- Succeeded by: Finsbury Metropolitan Borough Council

Structure
- Seats: 60 vestrymen
- Joint committees: 1855–1889: Appointed 1 member to Metropolitan Board of Works
- Length of term: 3 years

Meeting place
- Vestry Hall, City Road, Shoreditch

The St Luke's Vestry was the vestry of St Luke's, an urbanised parish north of the City of London, from 1733 until 1900. The vestry had growing secular authority over the parish with the relief of the poor its main responsibility. It was incorporated in 1855 as an administrative vestry within the Metropolitan Board of Works area, with local government and sanitary rights and responsibilities added over time.

== History ==
St Luke's Vestry was formed in 1733 when the Lordship division of St Giles without Cripplegate (the part outside of the City of London) was split off as a new parish of St Luke, to coincide with the building of St Luke's Church. A new church had been desired since 1663 with the Commission for Building Fifty New Churches finally providing funding.

=== Poor law ===
The vestry inherited the St Luke's Workhouse at Bunhill Fields from St Giles without Cripplegate. A local act in 1782 (Note: Saint Luke (Finsbury), Middlesex (Poor Relief etc.) Act 1782) enabled the vestry to build a new workhouse and offices just over the boundary in the parish of St Leonard Shoreditch.

In 1869 responsibility for the poor law passed to the Holborn Guardians, following the Metropolitan Poor Act 1867.

=== Incorporated vestry ===
In 1855 the parish of St Luke's came within the area of responsibility of the Metropolitan Board of Works. The St Luke's Vestry was incorporated as local government body and appointed one member to the Metropolitan Board of Works.

In 1867 a new vestry hall was completed at a cost of £6,400 (equivalent to £619,522 in 2025) on the St Luke's Workhouse site in the parish of St Leonard Shoreditch, fronting City Road.

In 1892/3 the vestry had an expenditure of £31,537 (equivalent to £3,503,772 in 2025).

The election of vestrymen was reformed by the Local Government Act 1894 with the vestry election in December 1894 the first to use the new system. The 1894 election was for all members with the third elected with the fewest votes retiring in 1896, then the next third in 1897 and the third with the most votes in 1898.

=== Abolition ===
The final vestry election was held on 17 May 1899.

St Luke's Vestry was abolished by the London Government Act 1899 with the first election to the replacement Finsbury Metropolitan Borough Council taking place on 1 November 1900.
