= Lady Henry Somerset Memorial =

Memorial in Westminster, London

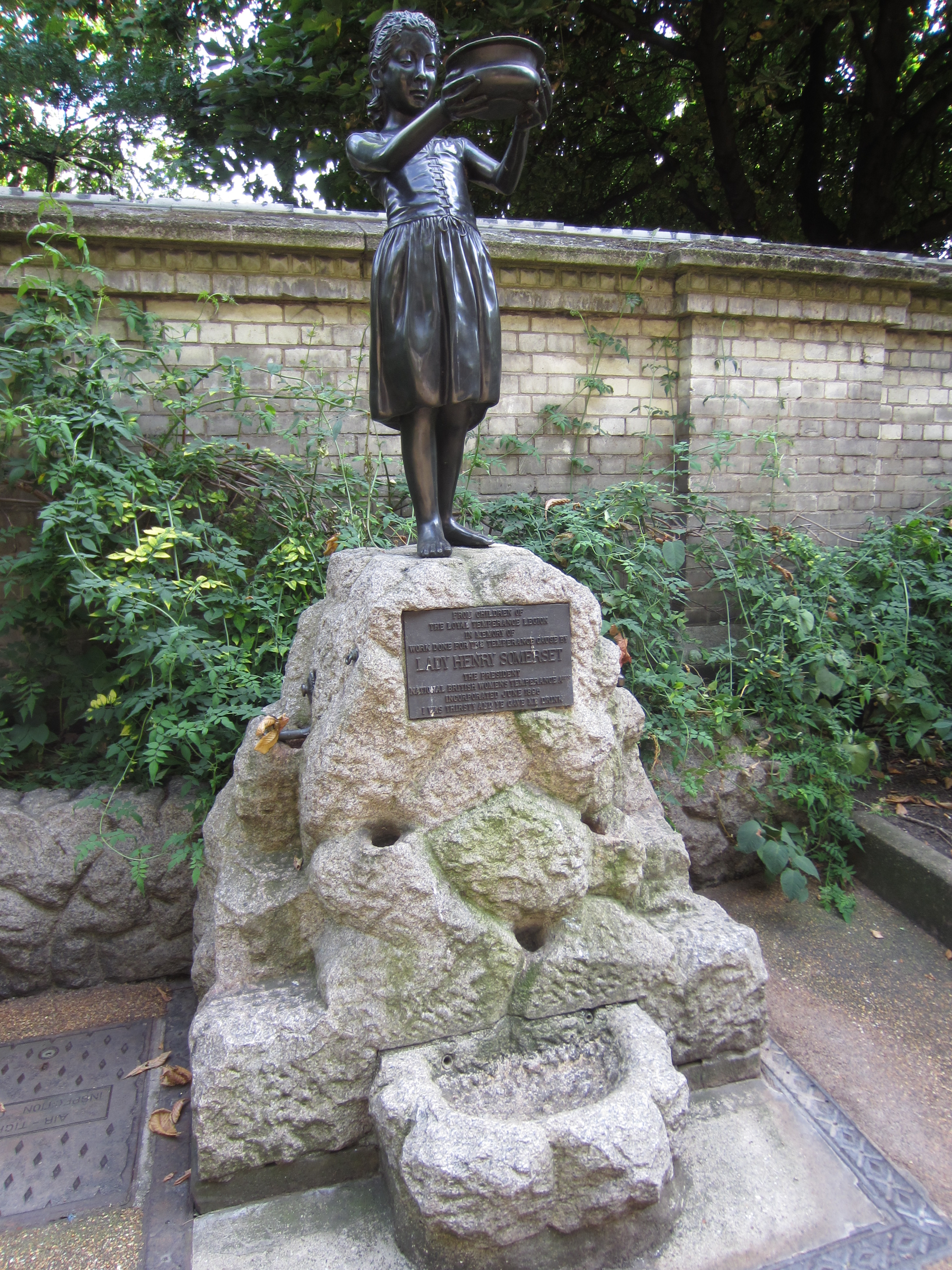
- The memorial in 2014
- Location: London, United Kingdom; 51°30′40″N 0°06′45″W

The Lady Henry Somerset Memorial, also known as the Lady Henry Somerset's Children's Fountain, is a Grade II-listed memorial to Lady Henry Somerset, in the Victoria Embankment Gardens in Westminster, London. It was listed on 24 February 1958.

== See also ==
- List of public art in the City of Westminster
