= Brentry Hospital =

Former hospital in England

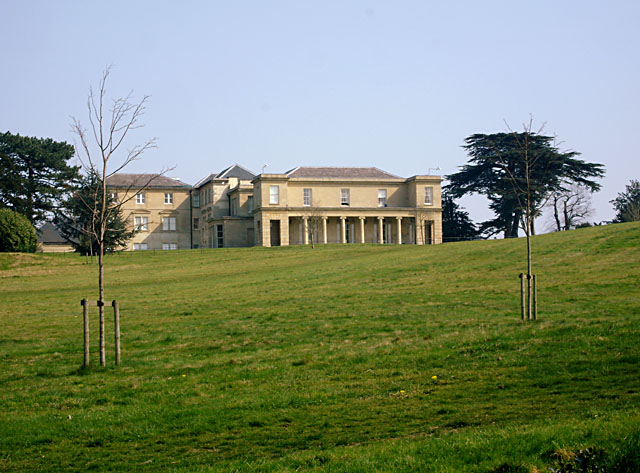
- Brentry House, one of the hospital buildings

- Shown in Bristol

Geography
- Location: Brentry, Somerset, England, United Kingdom
- Coordinates: 51.5052°N 2.6130°W

Organisation
- Care system: Public NHS
- Type: Psychiatric

History
- Founded: 1898
- Closed: 2000

Links
- Lists: Hospitals in England

Brentry Hospital was a hospital in Brentry, a northern suburb of Bristol, England. The building was constructed as a family home, one among many English country houses for the Somerset gentry. Now known as Repton Hall, after its famous architect, it has been converted into residential apartments.

== History ==
Brentry House, which was commissioned by William Payne, a Bristol merchant, and designed by Humphry Repton and his son John was completed in 1802. It was acquired by John Cave, a banker, in around 1817 and then by the Miller family in the 1850s.

The house was converted to become the main administration block for the Brentry Certified Inebriate Reformatory in 1898. The facility became an institution for the mentally ill as the Brentry Certified Institution in 1922 and was renamed the Brentry Colony in 1930. It joined the National Health Service as Brentry Hospital in 1948. After the hospital closed in 2000, the main building was converted into residential apartments and became known as Repton Hall.

The hospital site now forms a major component of the Brentry Conservation Area. The grounds, which are now known as Royal Victoria Park, are Grade II listed by English Heritage in the Register of Historic Parks and Gardens.
