= Lady Henry Somerset =

English temperance leader

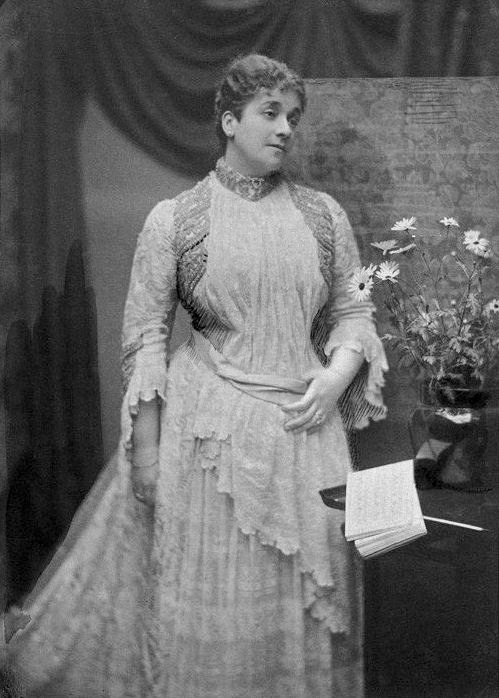
- Somerset in 1884
- Born: Isabella Caroline Somers-Cocks; 3 August 1851; London
- Died: 12 March 1921 (aged 69); London
- Burial place: Brookwood Cemetery
- Occupations: Philanthropist, temperance activist
- Spouse: Lord Henry Somerset (m. 1872)
- Children: 1
- Parent(s): Charles Somers-Cocks, 3rd Earl Somers (father); Virginia Pattle (mother)

Isabella Caroline Somerset, Lady Henry Somerset (née Somers-Cocks; 3 August 1851 – 12 March 1921), styled Lady Isabella Somers-Cocks from 5 October 1852 to 6 February 1872, was a British philanthropist, temperance leader and campaigner for women's rights. As president of the British Women's Temperance Association, she spoke at the first World's Woman's Christian Temperance Association convention in Boston in 1891.

== Early life ==
She was born in London as the first of three daughters of Charles Somers-Cocks, 3rd Earl Somers, and Virginia (née Pattle). She was maternally a niece of the photographer Julia Margaret Cameron and first cousin of the writer Virginia Woolf's mother, Julia Stephen. Lady Isabella was given a private education. As she had no brothers, she and her sister Adeline were co-heiresses to their father, the third sister, Virginia, having died of diphtheria as a child. Deeply religious, she contemplated becoming a nun in her youth.

== Marriage scandal ==
Lady Isabella married Lord Henry Somerset on 6 February 1872, and became known as Lady Henry Somerset. The match appeared to be perfect. Her husband was the second son of Henry Somerset, 8th Duke of Beaufort, and as such stood to inherit almost nothing, unlike her. On 18 May 1874, a son was born to the couple and named Henry Charles Somers Augustus. However, Lord Henry was homosexual, and the marriage failed. Male homosexual acts were a criminal offence in the United Kingdom at the time, but women were expected to turn a blind eye to every kind of infidelity. Lady Henry defied the social conventions by separating from her husband and suing him for custody over their son, thereby making his sexual orientation public. She won the court case in 1878 and started using the style of Lady Isabella Somerset, but was ostracised from society. Lord Henry departed for Italy, but the couple never divorced due to her strong religious inclinations. Lady Henry retreated to Ledbury, near her family home, where she occupied herself with charity work. Her father died in 1883, leaving her Eastnor Castle, estates in Gloucestershire and Surrey, properties in London and slums in the East End. Baptised and raised as Anglican, she became a Methodist in the 1880s.

== Temperance movement ==
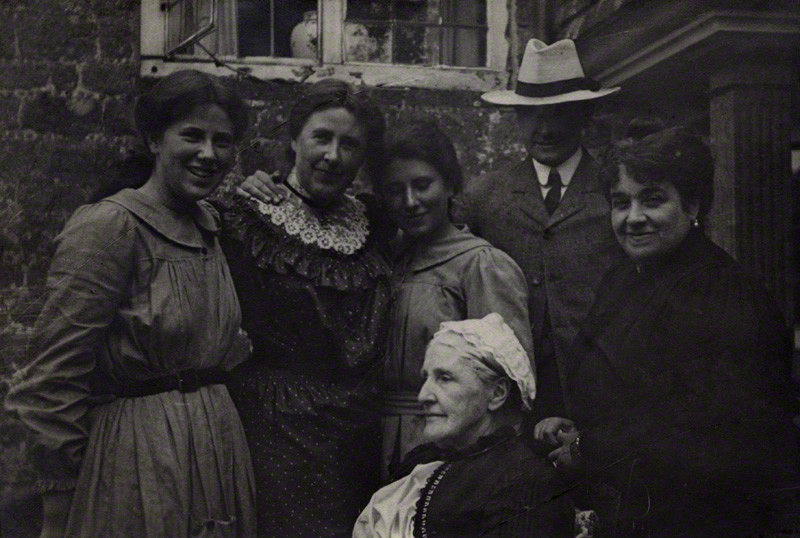
1904 photograph of Lady Henry Somerset (far right) with (from left to right) Ray Strachey, Mary Berenson, Hannah Whitall Smith (seated) Karin Stephen, and Logan Pearsall Smith

Lady Henry became interested in the temperance movement after her close friend committed suicide while intoxicated. Eloquent and compelling, she was elected president of the British Women's Temperance Association in 1890. The next year, she travelled to the United States, where she met Frances Willard, president of the World's Woman's Christian Temperance Association, and spoke at the first World's WCTA convention in Boston. Willard soon had her elected vice-president of the organisation and paid her extended visits in Britain several times. During Lady Henry's term as president of the BWTA, the organisation grew rapidly and attained great political and social influence. She allied herself with the Liberal Party, Earl Roberts and William Booth. Lady Henry promoted birth control; in 1895, she claimed that sin begins with an unwelcome child. By 1897, her friendship with Basil Wilberforce helped her reconcile with the Church of England.

Her critics claimed that Willard had too much influence on the BWTA. Though Lady Henry denied that she intended to turn the BWTA into a women's suffrage movement, she and Willard did openly advocate "emancipation" of women. From 1894 until 1899, she edited the weekly British feminist magazine The Woman's Signal. As the organisation gained more members, its president grew more ambitious. She supported licensing prostitution in parts of India as a means of dealing with the spread of sexually transmitted disease among British soldiers. The view was widespread among aristocracy, but alienated her from the rest of the BWTA. After arguments with Josephine Butler, Lady Henry was compelled to recant her views in 1898, to prevent the organisation from falling apart. Upon Willard's death the same year, Lady Henry assumed the office of president of the World's Woman's Christian Temperance Association and held it until 1906, visiting the United States for the last time in 1903. She gave up the leadership of the BWTA when her support for the Scandinavian system of public management of hotels attracted criticism. Rosalind Howard, Countess of Carlisle, succeeded her.

Lady Henry became a vegetarian in 1905. She believed a vegetarian diet would eliminate the alcohol problem. She was a follower of Joseph Wallace's diet which eschewed all fermented foods and salt.

== Later life and death ==
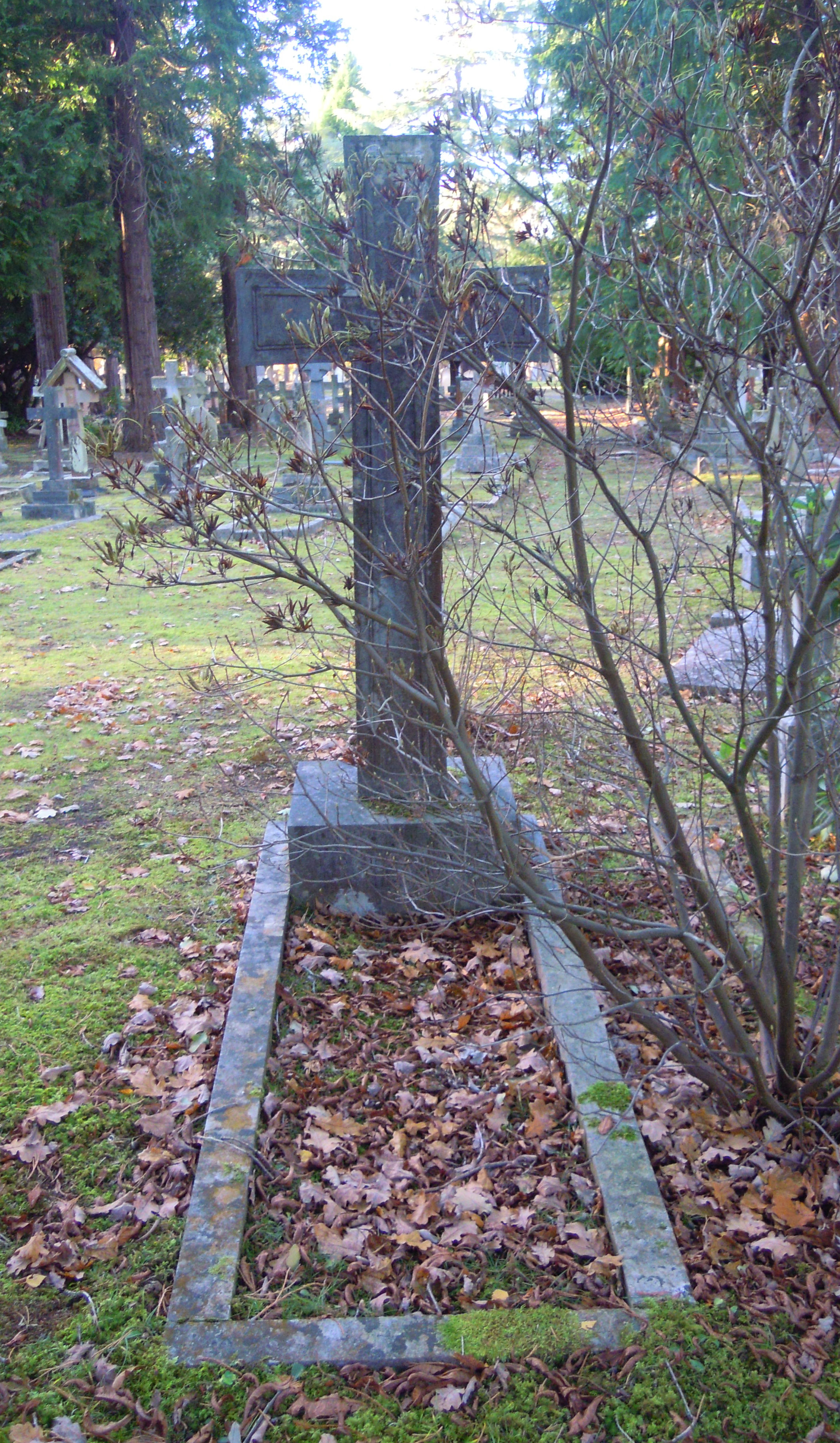
Lady Henry Somerset's grave in Brookwood Cemetery

Lady Henry devoted the rest of her life to the Duxhurst Industrial Farm Colony, in Reigate, which she had opened in 1895. It was a facility intended to rehabilitate alcoholics, which she saw as her most important task. The murderer Kitty Byron lived in this home after her release from prison in 1908.

In 1913, the readers of London Evening News voted Lady Henry as the woman they would most like as the first female prime minister of the United Kingdom. Her London flat was damaged during a Zeppelin raid in the First World War. She continued to work hard for the benefit of the poor, particularly women, using her wealth and prestige. She died in London on 12 March 1921 following a short illness. She was survived by her estranged husband and by their only child, who married Lady Katherine, a daughter of William Beauclerk, 10th Duke of St Albans. When her husband's elder brother's male line died out in 1984, Lady Henry's great-grandson David became the 11th Duke of Beaufort.

She is buried in Brookwood Cemetery.

== Gallery ==
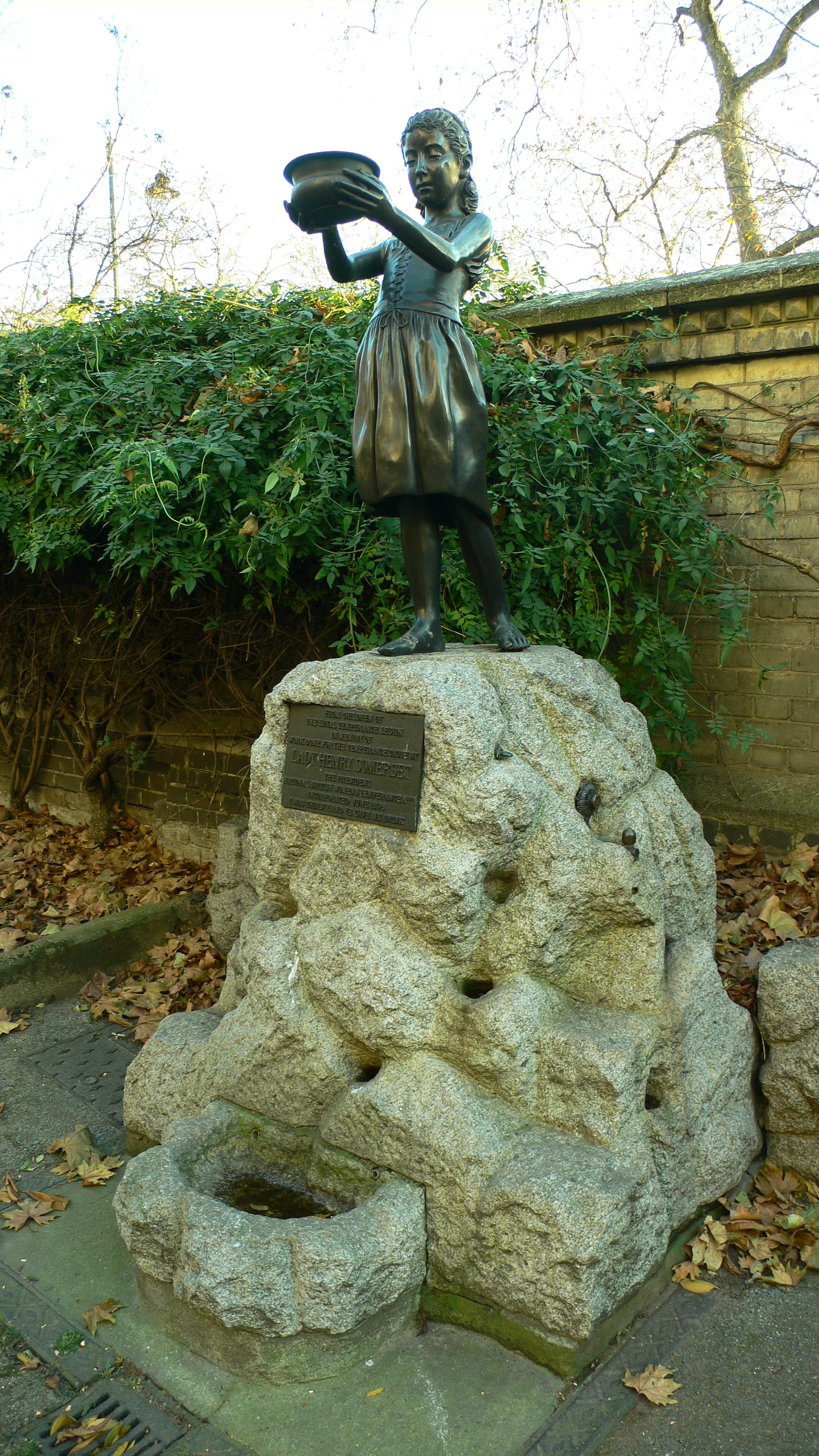
Lady Henry Somerset Memorial at Victoria Embankment, unveiled on 29 May 1897 and dedicated to Lady Henry by the Loyal Temperance Legion

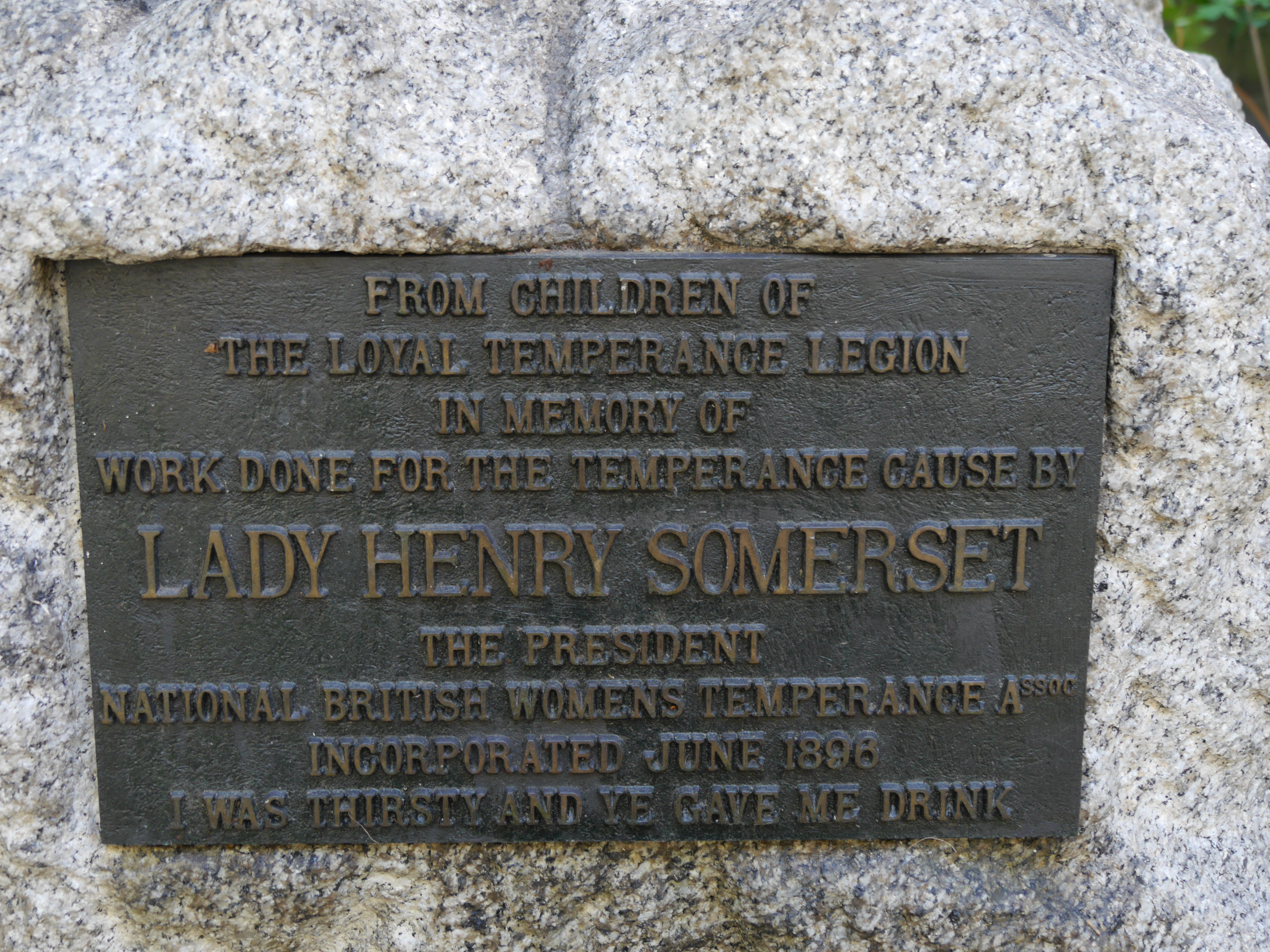
Memorial plaque

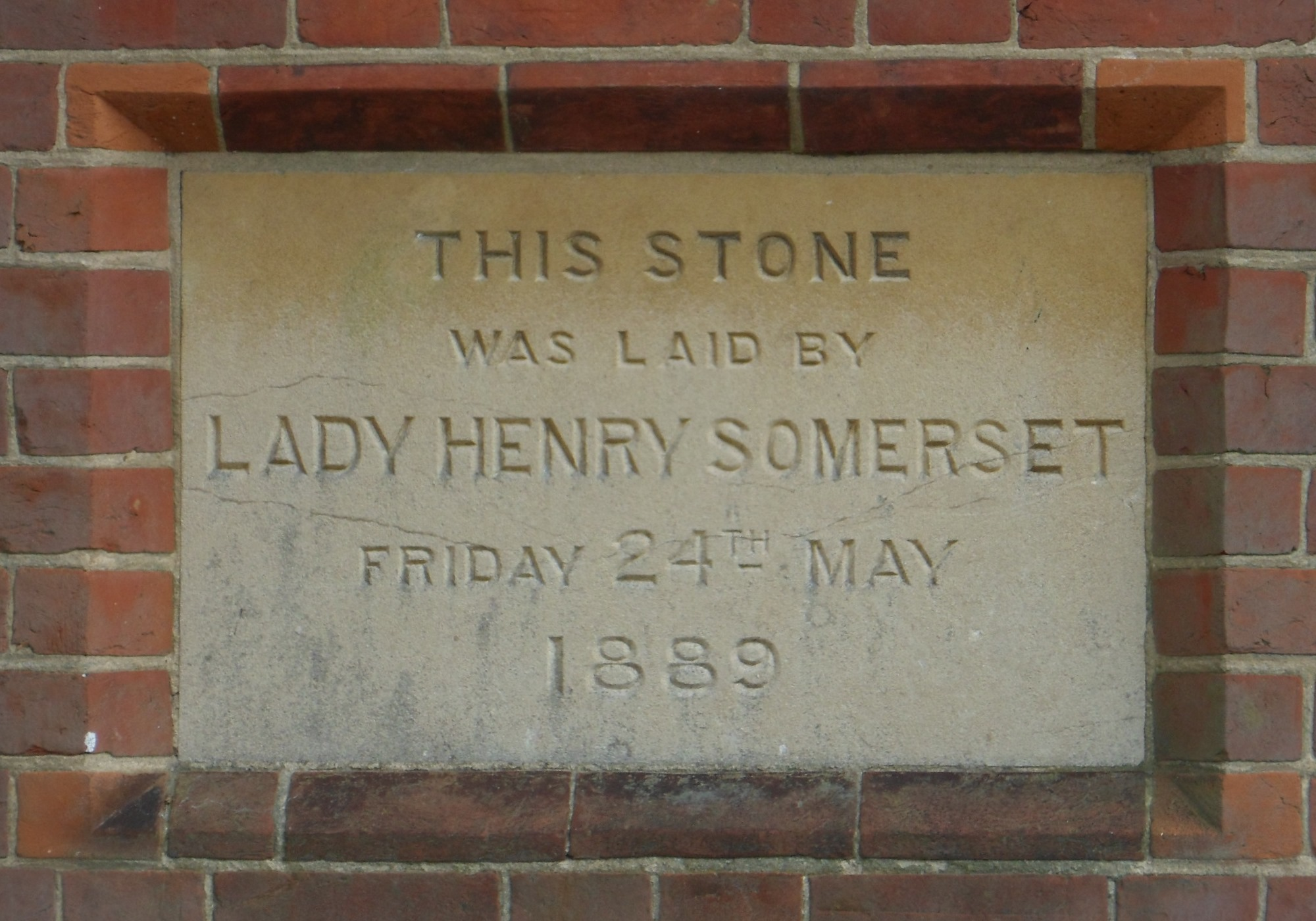
Foundation stone laid by Lady Henry at the former Congregational chapel in South Park, Reigate

Non-profit organization positions
Preceded by Margaret Lucas	President of the British Women's Temperance Association; 1890–1903	Succeeded by The Countess of Carlisle
Preceded by Frances Willard	President of the World's Woman's Christian Temperance Union; 1898–1906	Succeeded by The Countess of Carlisle
