= Pieminister =

- Company type: Private
- Industry: Food, catering
- Founded: 2003
- Founders: Jon Simon, Tristan Hogg
- Headquarters: Bristol, England
- Number of locations: 18 (2019)
- Area served: United Kingdom
- Products: Pies
- Number of employees: 300
- Website: pieminister.co.uk

Pieminister is a pie making company based in Bristol, South West England. Pieminister pies can be found in their restaurants, supermarkets and online, as well as various pubs and deli shops across the UK. As of 2022, Pieminister has restaurants and cafes in Birmingham, Bristol, Cardiff, Exeter, Leeds, Liverpool, London, Manchester, Nottingham, Oxford, Sheffield and Stoke on Trent.

== History ==
Pieminister was founded in 2003 by co-founders Jon Simon and Tristan Hogg. The company uses 100% free range British meat and Marine Stewardship Council-certified fish. All its vegetarian pies are Vegetarian Society approved.

One year after opening the first Pieminister they were invited to sell pies at London's Borough Market, and attended their first Glastonbury Festival in 2004, attending for ten years until rejection in 2015. The company now has shops in: Covered Market, Oxford; Trentham Estate; Cardiff; St Nicholas Market; Gabriel's Wharf; Boxpark; Northern Quarter (Manchester); Bold Street, Liverpool. The company opened a shop in Amsterdam in 2012.

For the year ending 31 March 2018, Bristol Live reports Pieminister has boosted sales in 2018 growing 14% to £14.3 million. "The business sold over five million pies, and served 50 tonnes of mash and 4,500 litres of gravy in its restaurants over the 12-month period."

== Charity ==
In 2013, the company launched its Cattle Drive campaign in partnership with African Development charity Send a Cow, which aims to raise £40,000 to help kick-start 30 family farms in Africa. Pieminister pledged to donate 10 pence to the campaign for every pie sold in supermarkets with a felt cow attached.

In 2022, Pieminister supported the Campaign Against Living Miserably (CALM), a suicide prevention campaign, with donations for each sale of the 'It's All Gravy' pie.
