= St Luke's Workhouse =

Workhouse in London

- Interactive map of the St Luke's Workhouse area

General information
- Status: Demolished
- Type: Workhouse
- Location: Shoreditch, England
- Coordinates: 51.5291°N 0.0925°W
- Client: St Luke's Vestry

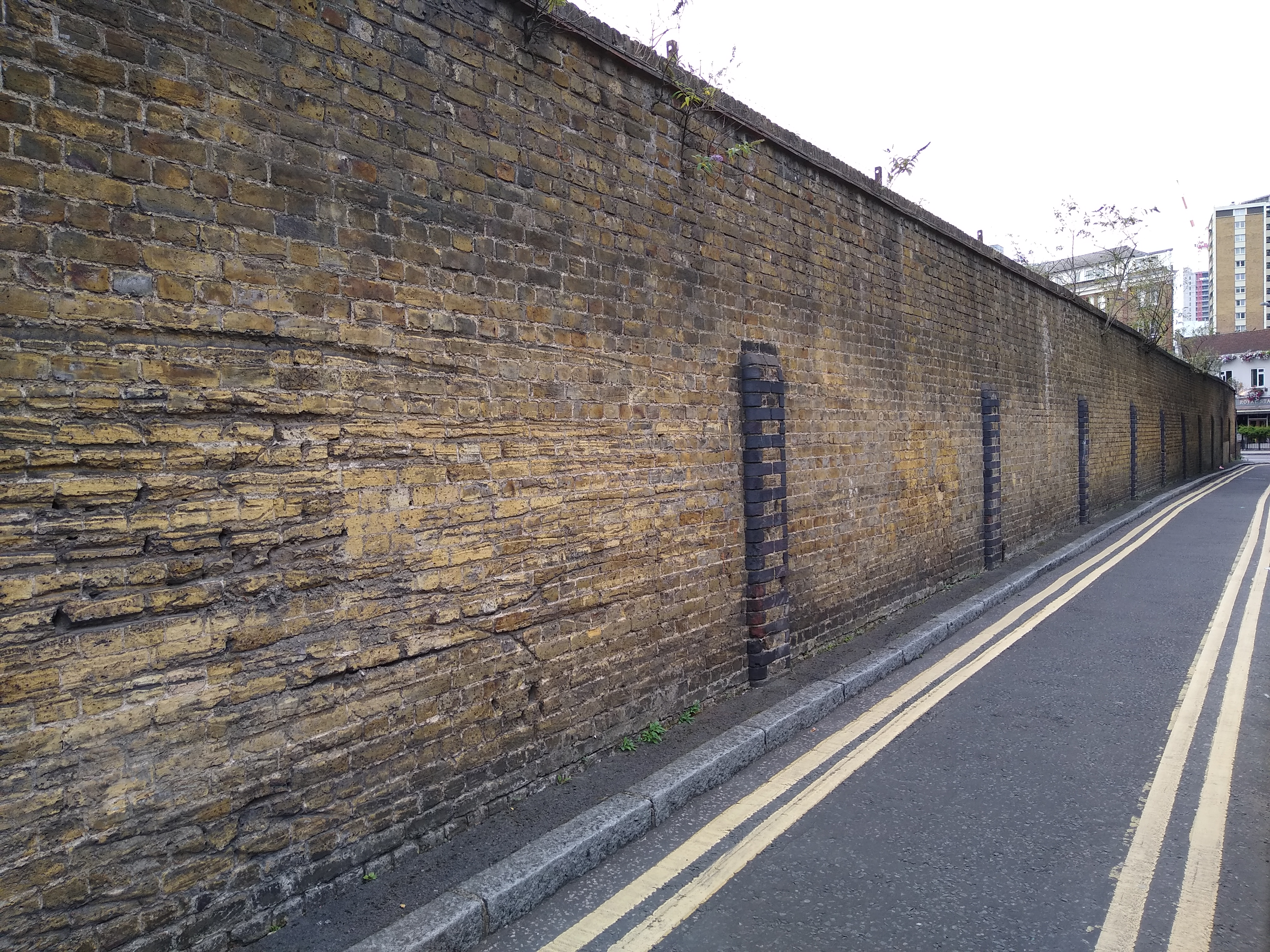
The wall surrounding the site in 2020

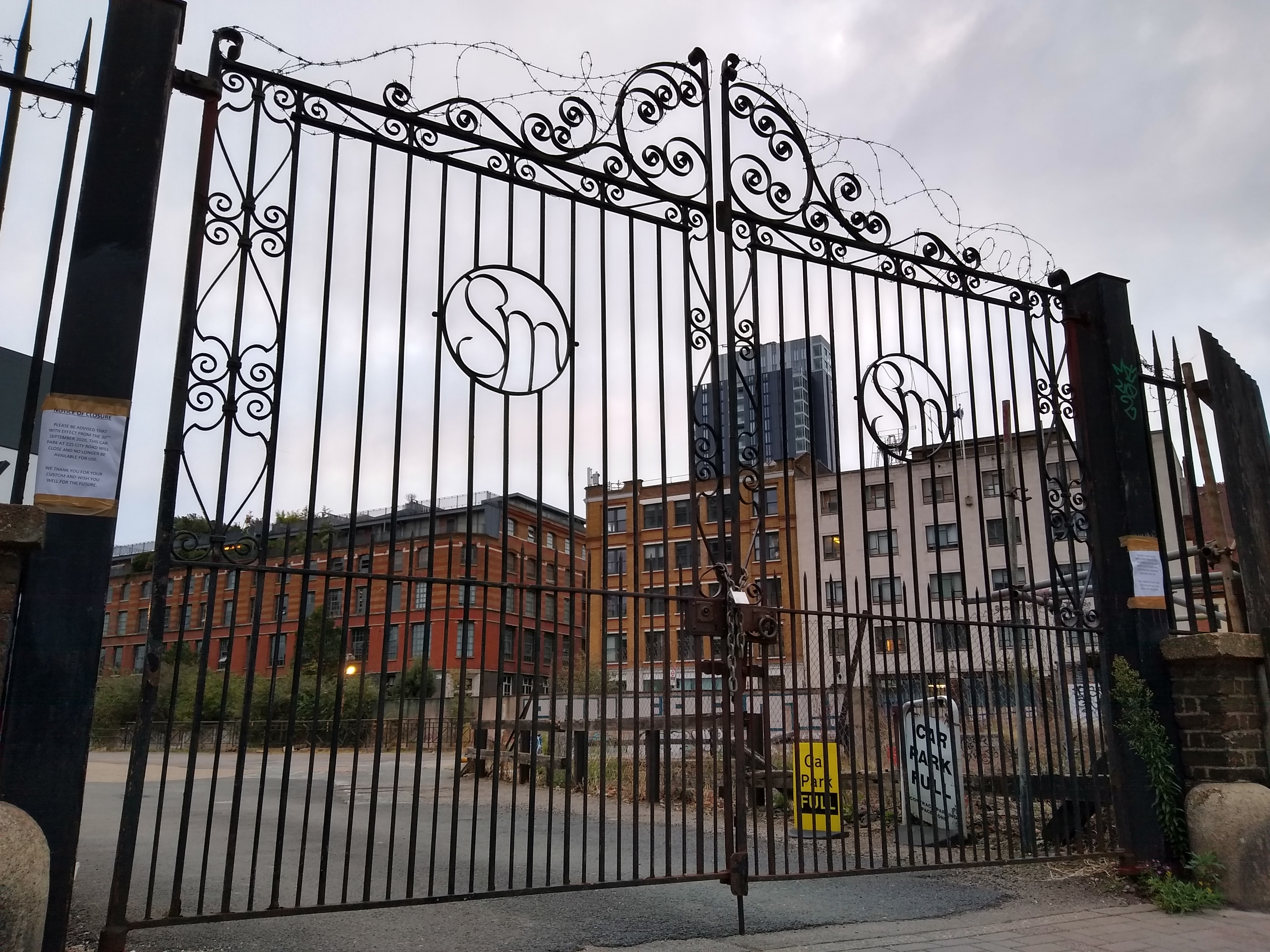
Entrance gate to what is now a carpark, with the letters 'SM' visible

The St Luke's Workhouse stood on City Road between Wellesley Terrace and Shepherdess Walk in the parish of St Leonard Shoreditch, today the London Borough of Hackney.

== Bunhill Fields site ==
Initially, the workhouse was located on the north side of Featherstone Street, Bunhill Fields, it having opened in 1724. It was in the Lordship division of the St Giles without Cripplegate parish that was outside the City of London and became the new parish of St Luke's in 1733. The lease expired in 1782.

== City Road site ==
A local act in 1782 (Note: Saint Luke (Finsbury), Middlesex (Poor Relief etc.) Act 1782) enabled the St Luke's Vestry to build the new workhouse and offices just over the boundary in the parish of St Leonard Shoreditch at a cost of £2,000 (equivalent to £279,307 in 2023).

In 1867 a new vestry hall was completed on the site, fronting City Road.

The workhouse infirmary became the Holborn and Finsbury Institution in 1916. In 1930 it was taken over by the London County Council and was renamed the St Matthew's Hospital in 1936. World War II bomb damage destroyed the southernmost block, which was never fully repaired. The hospital was closed in 1986.

The vestry hall was sold to the London and Provincial Assurance Company before being demolished in the 1960s.
