= Inebriates Act 1898 =

Act of the Parliament of the United Kingdom

Inebriates Act 1898 (Note: Section 30.)
- Act of Parliament
- Parliament of the United Kingdom
- Long title: An Act to provide for the treatment of Habitual Inebriates.
- Citation: 61 & 62 Vict. c. 60
- Territorial extent: United Kingdom

Dates
- Royal assent: 12 August 1898
- Commencement: 1 January 1899 (Note: Section 29.)
- Repealed: Scotland: 1 September 2009
Other legislation
Amends	Habitual Drunkards Act 1879
Amended by	Inebriates Act 1899; Inebriates Amendment (Scotland) Act 1900; Indictments Act 1915; Poor Law Act 1927; National Assistance Act 1948; Statute Law (Repeals) Act 1976; Licensing (Scotland) Act 1976; Licensing Act 2003
Repealed by	Scotland: Licensing (Scotland) Act 2005 (Consequential Provisions) Order 2009 (SI 2009/)248).

Status: Partially repealed

Text of statute as originally enacted

Revised text of statute as amended

Text of the Inebriates Act 1898 as in force today (including any amendments) within the United Kingdom, from legislation.gov.uk.

The Inebriates Act 1898 (61 & 62 Vict. c. 60) is an act of the Parliament of the United Kingdom, which was passed in 1898. The Inebriates Act 1898 was directly due to the Jane Cakebread case.

It allowed non-criminal inebriates to be admitted to reformatories for up to three years if they had been convicted of drunkenness four times in one year. Criminal inebriates were also included if they had been convicted of an imprisonable crime.

State inebriate reformatories could be established by the Secretary of State paid for by the government. Certified inebriate reformatories satisfying the certification process of the Secretary of State could be created on the application of the council of any county or borough or of any persons desirous of establishing an inebriate reformatory.

The Habitual Drunkards Act 1879 (42 & 43 Vict. c. 19) had allowed authorities to establish retreats for inebriates but payment by the inmate was required, thus excluding those working-class drunkards most at risk and with the least financial support.

A year after the Inebriate Act's passage, the Journal of Mental Science viewed the results as disappointing in part due to lack of funding, with no reformatories at all in Scotland or Ireland and with those in England insufficient to meet demand. The immediate need for a reformatory for men was noted.

As of December 1900, no state reformatories were built and councils did not fund any. Some councils made use of privately owned homes, such as Brentry, near Bristol, Duxhurst, near Reigate, and St Joseph's Reformatory at Ashford, Kent. A review of the Act reported "During the first year’s working of the new Act, only eighty-two patients were received, five under Section 1, upon conviction for an offence punishable by imprisonment or penal servitude; and seventy-two under Section 2, on a new conviction, after three previous convictions within a year, of an habitual drunkard. Of these, London has supplied sixty-one cases."

By 1904, women accounted for 91% of those in inebriate retreats while accounting for 20% of convictions for drunkenness. Out of the 3636 compulsory admissions between 1899 and 1910, 84% were women. By 1906, nine of the eleven reformatories in England were exclusively for women, with the other two having space for both genders.

The act was superseded by the Mental Deficiency Act 1913 (3 & 4 Geo. 5. c. 28), reclassifying many inebriates as mental defectives. The last inebriate reformatories closed by the 1920s, though many were reclassified and operated as mental institutions.

== Subsequent developments ==
The whole act except section 30 and Schedule 1, and in schedule 1, the entries relating to the Refreshment Houses (Ireland) Act 1860, the Dublin Police Act 1842 and the Licensing (Ireland) Act 1836, was repealed by section 1(1) of, and part II of schedule 1 to, the Statute Law (Repeals) Act 1976, which came into force on 27 May 1976.
