= Fishponds railway station =

Railway station building

Coordinates: 51.4777°N 2.5293°W

Fishponds
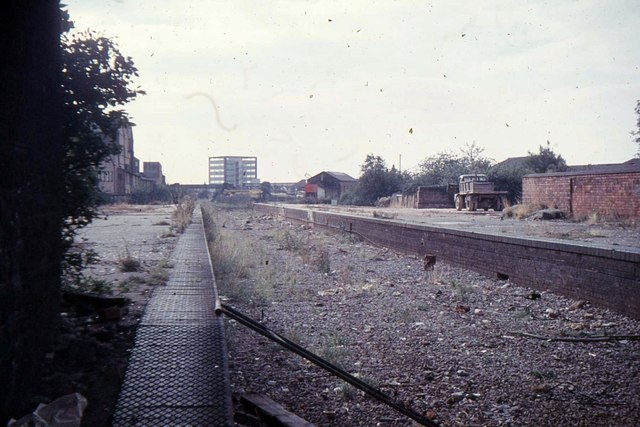
- Fishponds railway station in 1972

General information
- Location: Fishponds, City of Bristol; England
- Grid reference: ST632755
- Platforms: 2

Other information
- Status: Disused

History
- Pre-grouping: Midland Railway
- Post-grouping: London, Midland and Scottish Railway; London Midland Region of British Railways

Key dates
- March 1866: Opened as Fish Ponds
- 1 April 1866: Renamed Stapleton
- 1 January 1867: Renamed Fish Ponds
- 1 May 1939: Renamed Fishponds
- 7 March 1966: Closed
Location

Fishponds railway station was a station in Fishponds, Bristol, England, which was closed by Dr Beeching's cuts in the 1960s.

Fishponds station was just south of where Morrisons supermarket car park is today. The railway line was built in 1835 for transport of coal from Coalpit Heath to industry in the centre of Bristol. The station, originally named Fish Ponds, was opened in March 1866, and was renamed Stapleton on 1 April 1866. It was part of the Bristol to Birmingham line of the Midland Railway. The station was renamed Fish Ponds on 1 January 1867, and Fishponds on 1 May 1939. It had two platforms plus a shunting line constructed in 1905 for the Avonside Locomotive Works to move their newly built locomotives onto the main line.

== Network ==
The stations at the Bristol end of the Midland line were St Philips (where it ended within walking distance of Bristol Temple Meads), then Fishponds, Staple Hill and Mangotsfield. At Mangotsfield the lines split, and passengers could continue onto Gloucester past Parkfield Colliery and Coalpit Heath, and or through Warmley, Oldland Common and Bitton when the Mangotsfield and Bath Branch Line was opened in 1869. There was also a spur to Clifton Down, the Clifton Extension Railway, built in 1874 and closed to passenger traffic in 1941.

== Closure ==
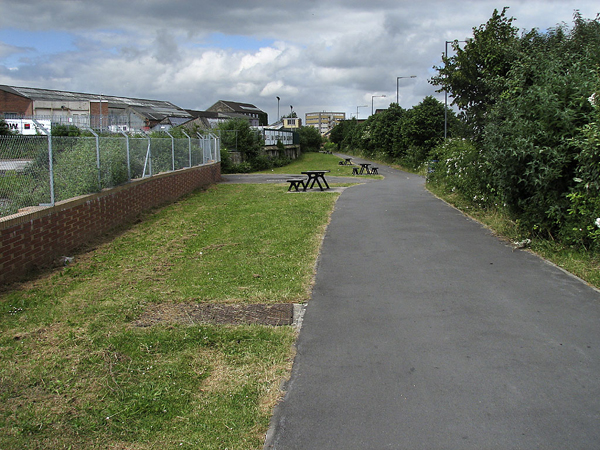
The site of Fishponds railway station in June 2006.

The line was closed in the Beeching cuts of the 1960s. Stopping passenger services on the Bristol to Gloucester line ceased on 4 January 1965; the station closed to goods traffic on 31 December 1965. However, trains continued between Bristol and Bath Green Park until 7 March 1966. The signal box remained open until 12 April 1968, when most of the station buildings were demolished. The line through the station was due to close on 3 January 1970, but a landslip at nearby Staple Hill led to its closure a week early. The tracks were later removed. There are still remains including the stairs to the footbridge on the Bristol side. The line was converted into the Bristol & Bath Railway Path which was completed in 1986, though the trail through the Fishponds station site deviates from the original rail line because of the roads associated with a supermarket on adjoining land.

== Services ==
Preceding station	Disused railways	Following station
Bristol St Philips; Line and station closed	Midland Railway; Bristol and Gloucester Railway	Staple Hill; Line and station closed
Bristol Temple Meads; Line closed, station open	Midland Railway; Bristol and Gloucester Railway	Staple Hill; Line and station closed
Montpelier; Line closed, station open	Midland Railway; Clifton Extension Railway	Staple Hill; Line and station closed
