= Warmley railway station =

Former railway station in England

Coordinates: 51.4600°N 2.4751°W

Warmley
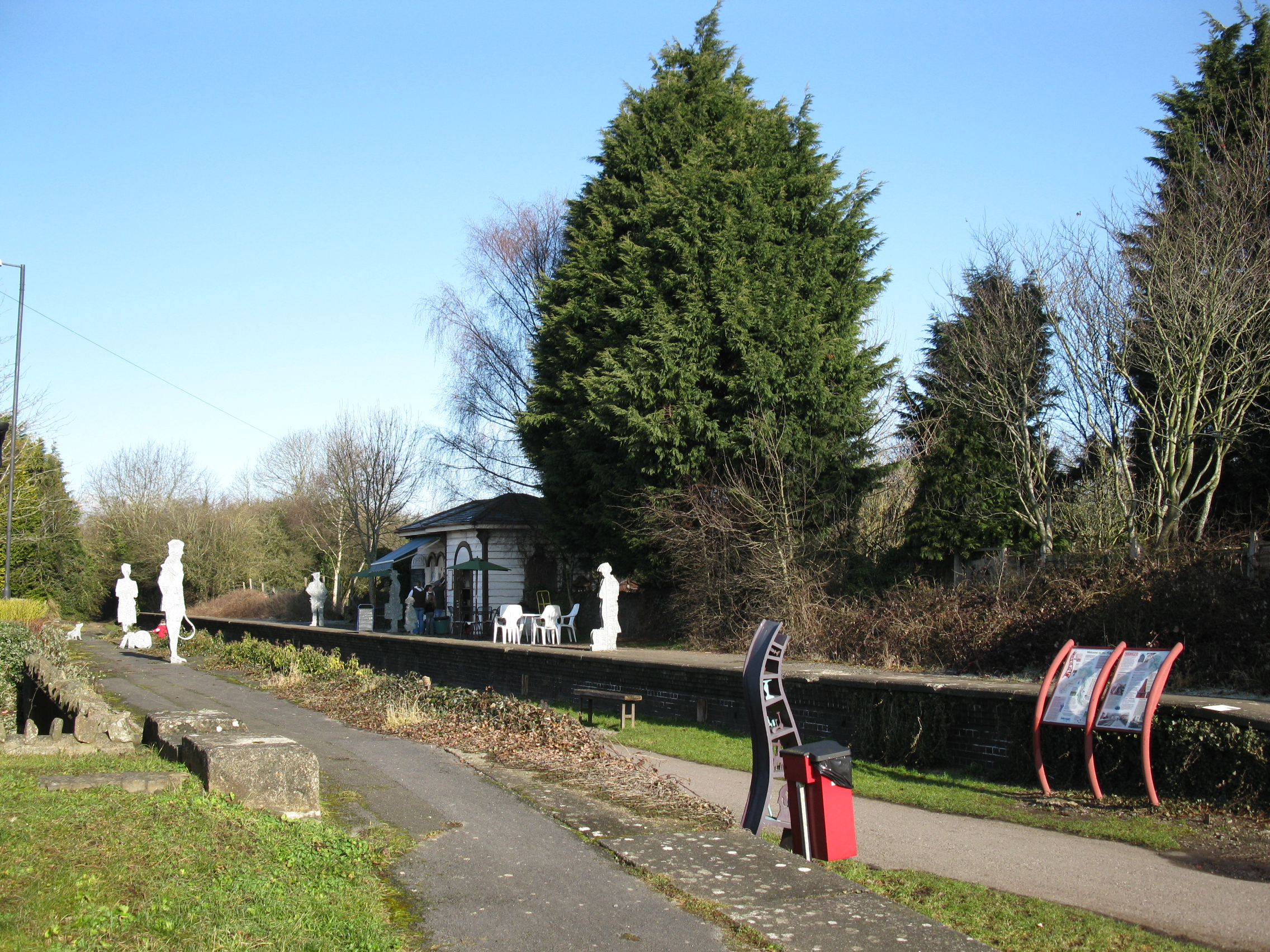
- Warmley railway station in 2010

General information
- Location: Warmley, South Gloucestershire; England
- Grid reference: ST670735
- Platforms: 2

Other information
- Status: Disused

History
- Original company: Midland Railway
- Pre-grouping: Midland Railway
- Post-grouping: London, Midland and Scottish Railway; London Midland Region of British Railways

Key dates
- 4 August 1869: Opened
- 7 March 1966: Closed
Location

Warmley was a small railway station just south of Mangotsfield on the Midland Railway Mangotsfield and Bath Branch Line. The station was sited just north of a level crossing on the A420 road through the village. It had wooden buildings: the shelter on the down platform (towards Bath) survives and is used on occasion as a refreshment stop on the Bristol & Bath Railway Path, which follows the route of the railway.

== Services ==
The station was served by stopping trains from Bath to Mangotsfield, Bristol St Philips and Bristol Temple Meads, via Bitton and Oldland Common.

Preceding station	Disused railways	Following station
Mangotsfield; Line and station closed	Midland Railway; Mangotsfield and Bath Branch Line	Oldland Common; Line closed, station open
