= Mangotsfield railway station =

Former train station near Bristol, England

Mangotsfield
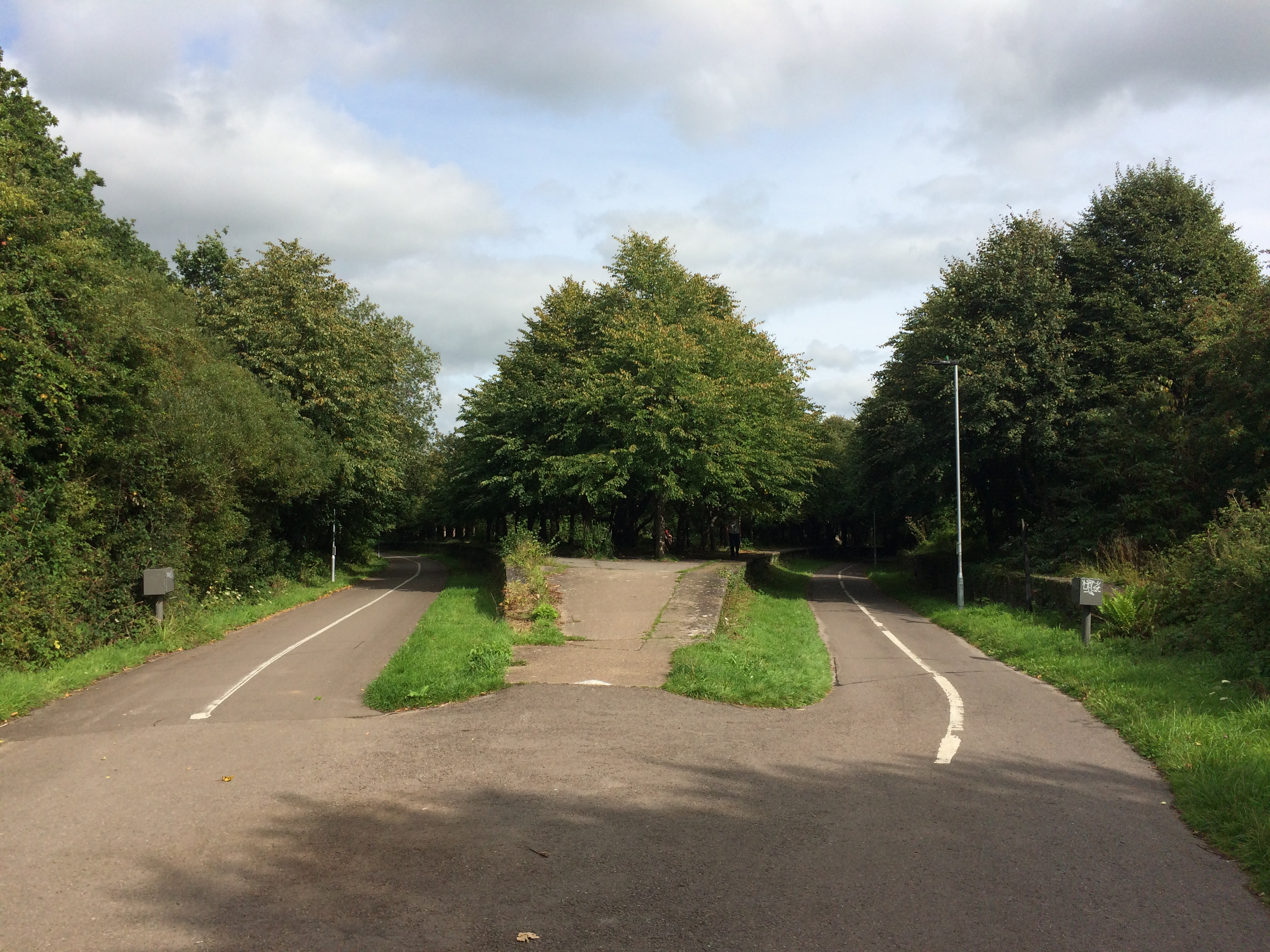
- The western end of the station in 2017

General information
- Location: Mangotsfield, South Gloucestershire; England
- Coordinates: 51.4760°N 2.4832°W
- Grid reference: ST665753
- Platforms: 6

Other information
- Status: Disused

History
- Original company: Bristol and Gloucester Railway
- Pre-grouping: Midland Railway
- Post-grouping: London, Midland and Scottish Railway

Key dates
- 1 May 1845: Opened
- 4 August 1869: Relocated further west
- 1883: Refurbished
- 10 June 1963: Closed to goods
- 7 March 1966: Closed to passengers
Location

Mangotsfield railway station was a railway station on the Midland Railway route between Bristol and Birmingham, 5 miles (8.0 km) north-east of Bristol Temple Meads and 82 miles (132 km) from Birmingham New Street, serving the village of Mangotsfield in South Gloucestershire, England. The station was opened in 1845 by the Bristol and Gloucester Railway, but had very little in the way of passenger amenities. The station was resited in 1869 to serve the new Mangotsfield and Bath Branch Line, and became an important junction station with extensive facilities and six platforms. Passenger footfall however failed to match the station's size, though at its peak eight staff were employed. The station closed in 1966 when services to Bath ended as part of the Beeching cuts, and the line through the station closed in 1969. The railway became a cycle path in the 1980s, and is a popular resting point on the route as several of the station's walls and platforms are still in situ.

== History ==
=== First station ===
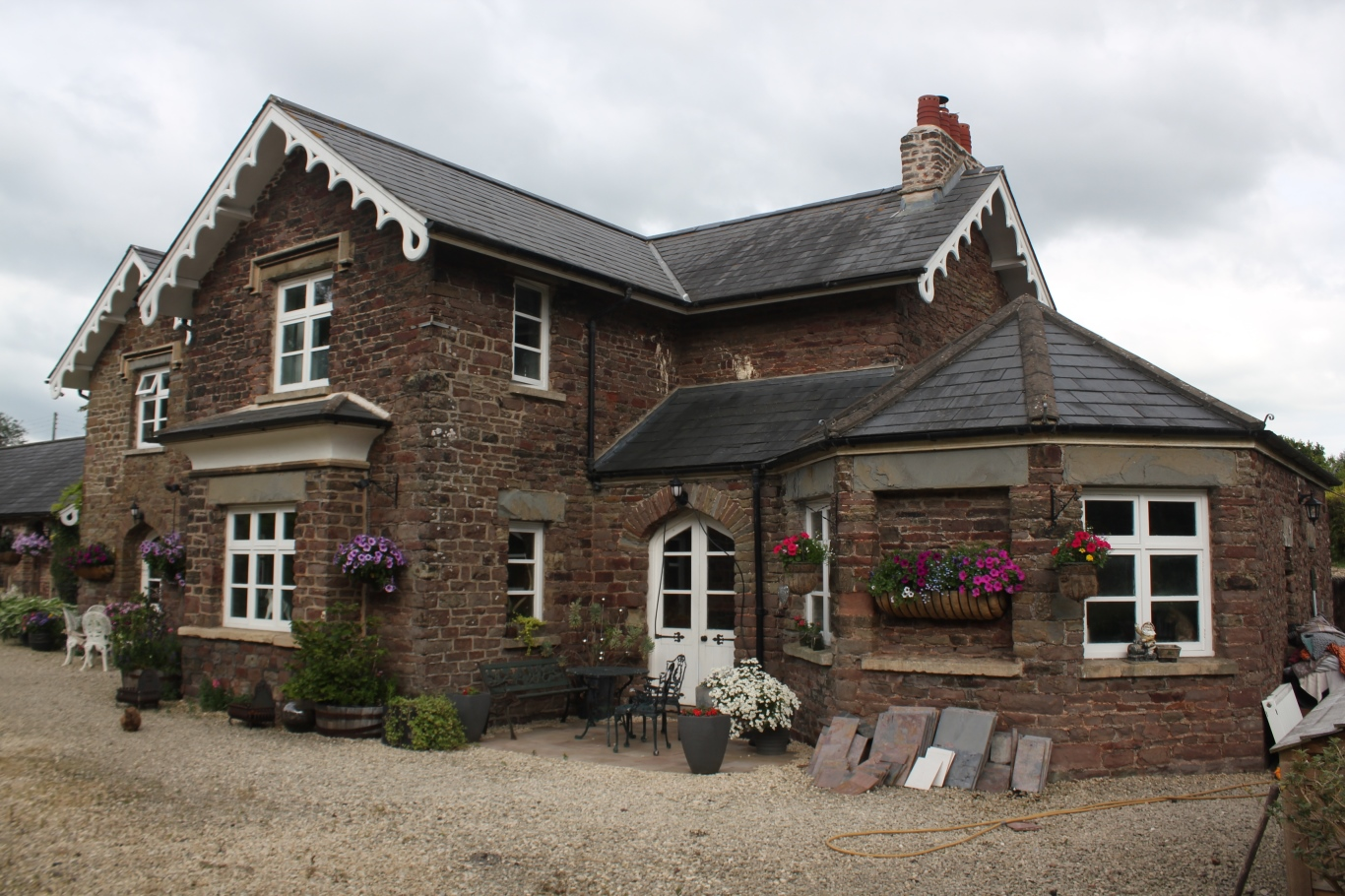
The original station building, now a private house

The first railway through Mangotsfield was the Bristol and Gloucestershire Railway, which opened in 1828. The line, which was horse-drawn, was built to convey stone and coal to Bristol Harbour. The line was built as single track 4 ft 8 1/2 in (1,435 mm) standard gauge, but with space for double track. A connecting branch, known as the Avon and Gloucestershire Railway, was built from Mangotsfield south towards the River Avon in the 1830s. The Bristol and Gloucestershire Railway was purchased by the Bristol and Gloucester Railway in the early 1840s, as part of a plan to connect Gloucester with the Great Western Railway at Bristol Temple Meads. The line was converted to locomotive operation and 7 ft (2,134 mm) broad-gauge, with services beginning in July 1844. There was initially no station at Mangotsfield, which was a small village in an area of farmland.

In March 1845, the Railways Board resolved "that a station on the cheapest scale be established at Mangotsfield". Less than two months later, on 1 May 1845, the station was opened. It was located 1/2 mile (0.8 km) east of the village, just south of what is now the B4465 Main Road in the hamlet of Shortwood, at the junction with the Avon and Gloucestershire Railway. Sited 5 miles 53 chains (9.11 km) along the line from Bristol Temple Meads and 82 miles 20 chains (132.37 km) from Birmingham New Street, it was the first station north from Temple Meads, with Yate being the next station north, 4 miles 58 chains (7.60 km) away. (Note: Railways in the United Kingdom are, for historical reasons, measured in miles and chains. There are 80 chains to the mile.) It took until 1866 for another station – Fishponds, 2 miles 45 chains (4.12 km) to the west – to be opened between Mangotsfield and Bristol.

Facilities at Mangotsfield were very limited. When the station opened there was nothing apart from a platform either side of the two running lines. The western "up" platform served trains towards Gloucester, and the eastern "down" platform served trains towards Bristol. A shelter was added to the up platform in 1848, and a brick station building was built separate from the platforms, however no electrical telegraph system was provided. There were extensive sidings north of the station.

By the time the station at Mangotsfield opened, the Bristol and Gloucester Railway had effectively become part of the Midland Railway, however the official handover was 7 May, six days after the station opened. The station had an initial passenger service of six trains per day each way between Bristol and Gloucester. Following the conversion of the line to dual broad and standard gauge in 1854, passenger trains were all standard gauge, which allowed direct services to Birmingham New Street. Occasional broad gauge goods trains operated until 1882.

Preceding station	Historical railways	Following station
Yate; Line closed, station open.	Bristol and Gloucester Railway (1845)	Bristol Temple Meads; Line closed, station open
Yate; Line closed, station open.	Midland Railway; Bristol and Gloucester Railway (1845–1866)	Bristol Temple Meads; Line closed, station open
Yate; Line closed, station open.	Midland Railway; Bristol and Gloucester Railway (1866–1869)	Fish Ponds (Note: Fishponds was opened in 1866 as Fish Ponds (two words), renamed as Stapleton the same year, reverted to Fish Ponds less than a year later, and eventually became Fishponds (one word) in 1939.); Line and station closed

=== Second station ===
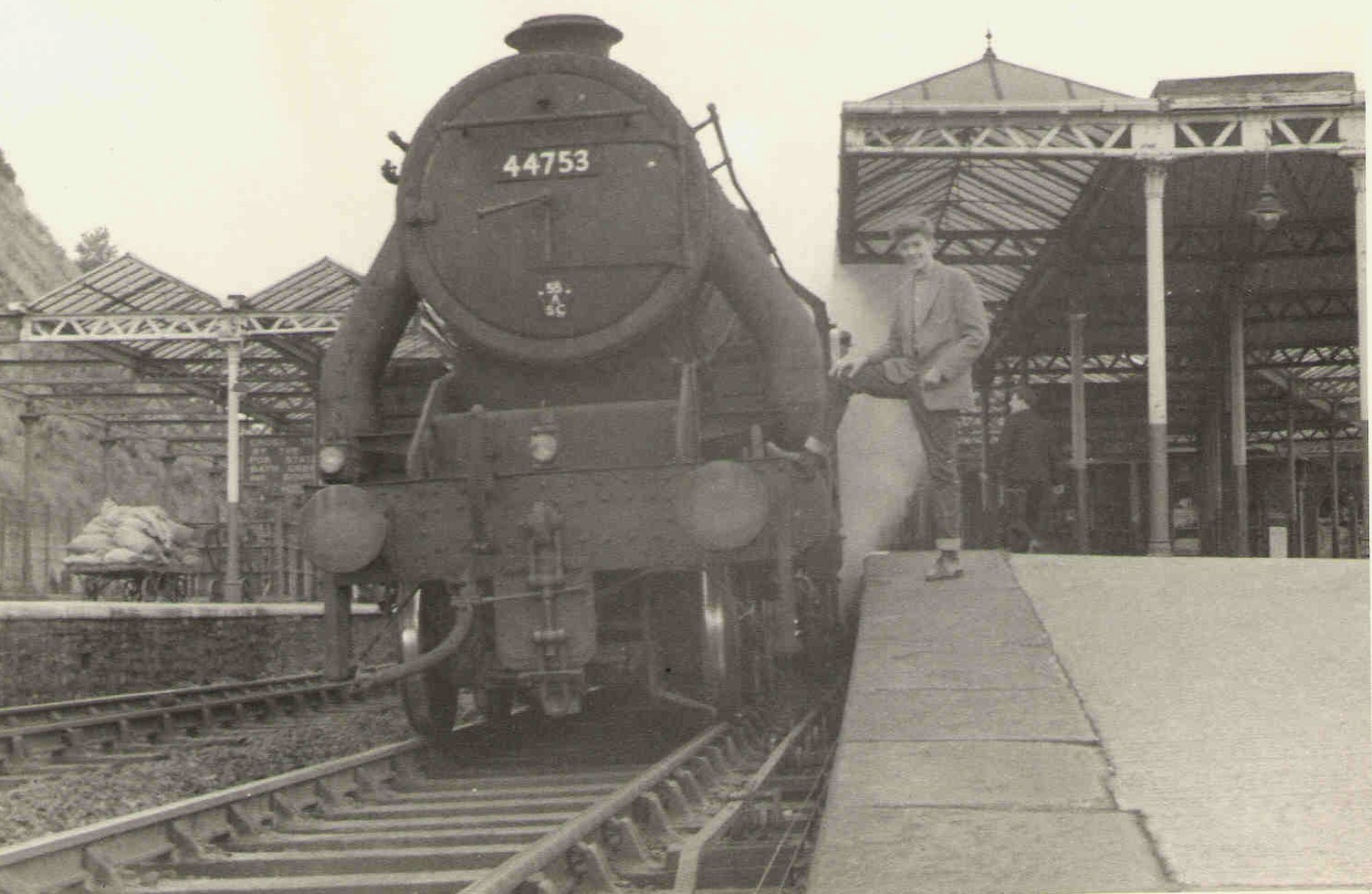
A train at Mangotsfield in 1958, working a service to Bristol from the north. The photo is taken from the western end of the station, and shows the extensive glass canopies which were built in 1883.

When the Midland Railway took over the Bristol and Gloucester in 1845, it announced plans to build a branch to Bath. While several different plans were mooted, what eventually came to pass was the Mangotsfield and Bath Branch Line, roughly following the route of the Avon and Gloucestershire Railway south from Mangotsfield to a terminus at Bath Green Park. A large triangular junction was built at Mangotsfield, and a new station constructed at the western point of the junction, 1/2 mile (0.8 km) from the centre of Mangotsfield. The branch, and with it the new station, opened on 4 August 1869. The original station was closed to passengers, but the goods facilities were retained. The new station was 42 chains (0.84 km) west of the original, 5 miles 11 chains (8.27 km) from Bristol Temple Meads, 82 miles 62 chains (133.21 km) from Birmingham New Street and 9 miles 58 chains (15.65 km) from Bath Green Park. The next station towards Bath was Warmley, 1 mile 17 chains (1.95 km) to the south, with Fishponds now 2 miles 3 chains (3.28 km) away and Yate 5 miles 20 chains (8.45 km) distant. In 1888, a station was opened at Staple Hill, 1 mile 28 chains (2.17 km) west of Mangotsfield.

The second station was much more extensive than the original. Built on the southern face of Rodney Hill, it had three platform islands, giving six platform faces, with the junction apex forming the western end of the middle island. The northern island platform had two platforms for trains going towards Birmingham: the northernmost platform was mostly used as a passing loop for goods trains, and was known as "under the rock" due to the hill; the southern side was the Up Main Line. The centre island had its western apex at the junction and was triangular in shape. The northern face was the Down Main line, for trains from Birmingham; the southern face was the Up Bath line, for trains towards Bath. The southern island's north face was the Down Bath line, serving trains from Bath towards Bristol, and its southern side was a west-facing bay platform. The south side of the bay platform had a timber windbreak due to the station's exposed site, and thus the platform acquired the name "behind the box". The station as built was sparsely furnished: there was a small building on the centre platform in a standard Midland Railway style, (Note: Sources contemporaneous with the station's reconstruction in 1883 state that the original buildings were wooden; however, a source at the time that the second station opened in 1869 describes it as "a neat little stone structure".) which housed the booking office and two waiting rooms, and also a shelter on the Bristol-bound branch platform. Passengers were required to use a level crossing to change between platforms; however, "through carriages" — whereby a carriage from one train would be transferred to a train going a different direction, without need for passengers to alight — were also used.

The initial service along the Bath branch was 9 trains per day each way, increasing to 18 each way by 1910. From 1870, most Bristol-bound trains were diverted from Temple Meads to Bristol St Philip's, which the Midland Railway had opened after noting that many travellers from Mangotsfield and other branches found the location of Temple Meads to be inconvenient and would thus take the horse-drawn omnibus instead. In 1874, services began on the Clifton Extension Railway, a joint railway operated by the Midland and Great Western railways to connect to the Bristol Port Railway and Pier. The Midland initially operated 13 trains per day between Clifton Down and Mangotsfield, terminating in the bay platform. However, by 1887 these services would mostly terminate at Fishponds rather than Mangotsfield, and the service was discontinued in 1941. 1874 also saw the opening of the Somerset and Dorset Joint Railway, which had its northern terminus at Bath Green Park, providing more passengers for the branch. Trains from the north would frequently use the eastern side of the Mangotsfield triangle and continue on south from Bath. The triangle was also used for turning locomotives when the turntable at Bath was unavailable. Main line services also increased: by 1882 there were ten trains each way between Bristol and Gloucester via Mangotsfield, with trains variously continuing to Cheltenham, Worcester and Birmingham.

Significant enhancements were made to the station in 1883, designed by Midland Railway architect John Holloway Sanders and built by John Garlick of Birmingham. The original station buildings were deconstructed and sold to local tradespeople, with new stone buildings erected. The Western Daily Press described the new building on the centre platform in extensive detail:

...a substantial building of pennant stone, with Bath stone dressings. The block, roughly speaking, takes the form a triangle. The point nearest Bristol is fitted for the ticket clerk, and also accommodates luggage. Right in the centre of the triangle is the booking-office, approached by short passages with swing doors from the down main line and the up Bath line. This booking-hall is capitally lighted, and laid with Minton tiles The walls are wainscoted to the height of three or four feet with varnished red deal, and the cement work above is tinted in light colour. The seats and woodwork generally are of the same varnished deal, and have a light and very effective appearance. Opening from this central booking-hail are three waiting-rooms for ladies, gentlemen, and third class passengers, all of which are to be suitably fitted up. The chimney-pieces are a grey Devonshire marble which abounds in fossils, the polished sections of which form geological study for waiting travellers with a fondness for that science. Forming a base to the triangle and accessible from tho platforms are the lavatories and the porters' room. The former is entered from the down main line side, laid with Minton tiles, and is constructed with improved modern appliances. The porters' room is fitted with boiler and oven for their convenience.

As part of the reconstruction, a large glass roof was built on each platform, using a total of 138 iron posts and 30,000 square feet (2,800 m^{2}) of rolled plate glass in an iron frame. The canopies were ridged along the platforms, rather than perpendicular as was the usual Midland design. Wooden shelters were built on the outer island platforms. All the platforms were lengthened, to allow the longest Midland trains to call, and all laid with asphalt. A subway, with passages and stairs of Painswick stone, was built to provide access between platforms, replacing the level crossings. The station even had its own gas works, which also supplied the neighbouring station at Warmley. There were no catering facilities, as per the stipulation of the previous landowner, who was also the owner of a local hotel. There was, however, a book stall. By this point a signal box had been constructed at the western end of the southern island.

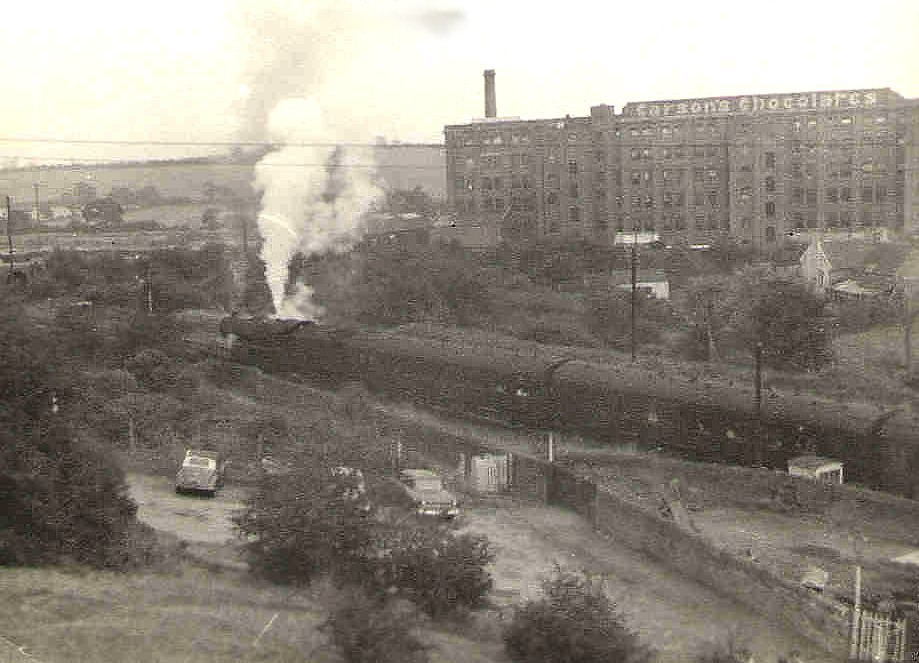
A northbound train departing Mangotsfield in 1958. The chocolate factory is visible in the background.

A Carson's Chocolate factory was opened in the middle of the Mangotsfield railway triangle in the early 1910s. (Note: Oakley states the factory had a private siding from 1912; the Western Daily Press, however, states that the factory was only completed in 1914, and local history website Living Easton states that it opened in 1913.) Served by a private siding; and with its own cricket pitch, tennis courts and bowling green; the factory became a well-known landmark for rail travellers, as well as an extra source of passengers for the station. The station also became the site of regular releases of racing pigeons.

In 1923, grouping resulted in the Midland Railway being absorbed into the London, Midland and Scottish Railway. Mangotsfield's peak usage came in the inter-war years, when the station staff consisted of a station master, two booking clerks, two foremen, and three porters; however, Mangotsfield itself never saw the large amounts of traffic it had been built for, and was considered a somewhat desolate place. Actor Arnold Ridley was once stranded at the station, and the sound of a train passing on the eastern side of the triangle, out of sight of the station, inspired him to write his play The Ghost Train. During the Second World War, the glass platform roofs were removed as a precautionary measure in the event of air raids, making the station even more unwelcoming to passengers.

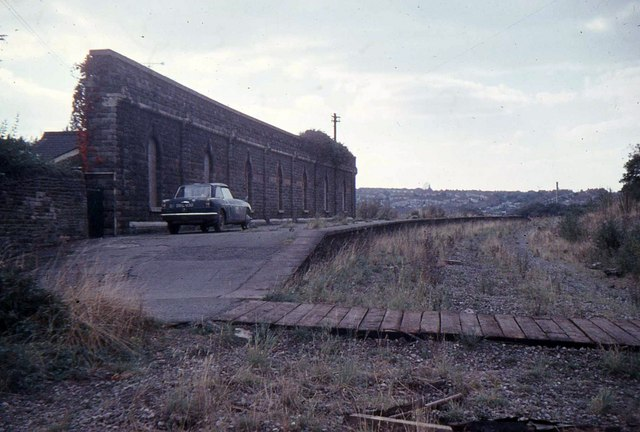
The station closed in 1966, and the tracks were lifted in 1972. This photo from that same year shows the down main line platform.

Passenger traffic declined following the war and when the railways were nationalised in 1948 – following the passage of the Transport Act 1947 – Mangotsfield came under the aegis of the London Midland Region of British Railways. The 1950s saw an increase in road travel, and rail passenger numbers declined. The eastern side of the Mangotsfield triangle closed on 18 September 1962, and, with the Great Western Main Line providing an alternative route from Bristol to Bath, the Beeching Report of 1963 recommended closure of the branch from Mangotsfield to Bath Green Park. Goods facilities at the original site of the station were withdrawn on 10 June 1963, and local stopping services between Bristol and Gloucester ended on 4 January 1965. Passenger services along the Bath branch were planned to be withdrawn from 3 January 1966, but had a temporary reprieve due to difficulties with the rail replacement bus service. The line and station eventually closed two months later on 7 March 1966. Trains continued to pass the station site non-stop for several years, however, as there were two routes between Bristol and Yate — via Filton and via Mangotsfield — it was decided to close the line through Mangotsfield as an economy measure. The line was slated to be closed on 3 January 1970, but on 26 December 1969 an embankment collapse near Fishponds blocked the line and it was never reopened.

Preceding station	Historical railways	Following station
Yate; Line closed, station open.	Midland Railway; Bristol and Gloucester Railway (1869–1888)	Fish Ponds; Line and station closed
Yate; Line closed, station open.	Midland Railway; Bristol and Gloucester Railway (1888–1922)	Staple Hill; Line and station closed
Yate; Line closed, station open.	London, Midland and Scottish Railway; Bristol and Gloucester Railway (1923–1948)	Staple Hill; Line and station closed
Yate; Line closed, station open.	London Midland Region of British Railways; Bristol and Gloucester Railway (1948–1965)	Staple Hill; Line and station closed
Warmley; Line and station closed.	Midland Railway; Mangotsfield and Bath Branch Line (1869–1888)	Fish Ponds; Line and station closed
Warmley; Line and station closed.	Midland Railway; Mangotsfield and Bath Branch Line (1888–1922)	Staple Hill; Line and station closed
Warmley; Line and station closed.	London, Midland and Scottish Railway; Mangotsfield and Bath Branch Line (1923–1948)	Staple Hill; Line and station closed
Warmley; Line and station closed.	London Midland Region of British Railways; Mangotsfield and Bath Branch Line (1948–1966)	Staple Hill; Line and station closed

=== Post-closure ===
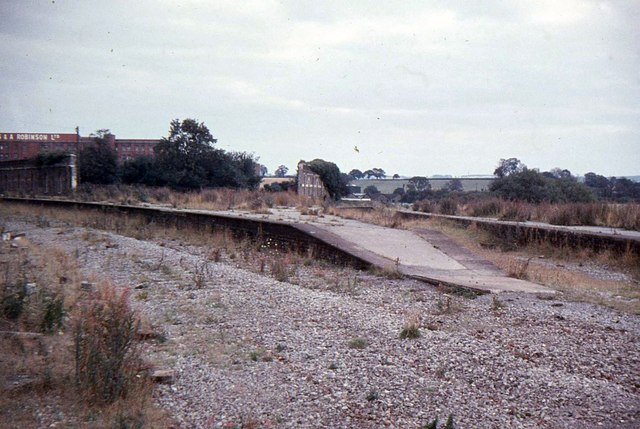
The western end of the station in 1973, after the tracks had been lifted.

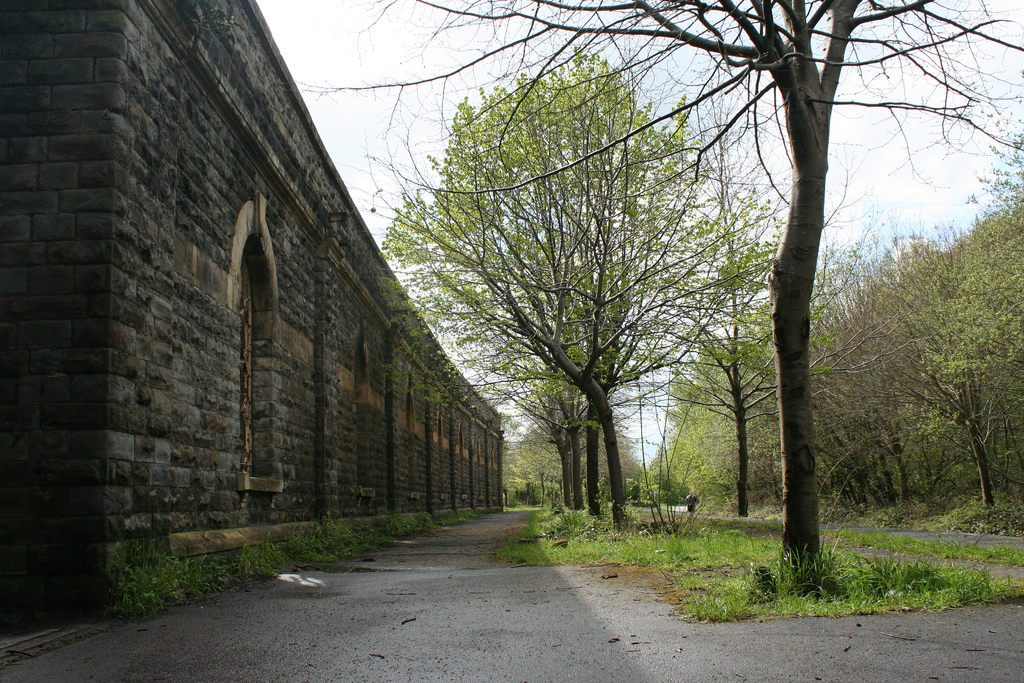
Since closure, the station has become part of the Bristol & Bath Railway Path.

Following the closure of the railway, the route fell into disuse. The buildings at Mangotsfield became derelict, with some demolition taking place. The central and southern island platforms remained in situ, as did some of the walls of the central platform buildings. The tracks were lifted in 1972, but that same year a group of local residents, aided by Robert Adley MP, set up the Bristol Suburban Railway Society, which would later become the Avon Valley Railway. The society's aim was reinstatement of the route from Bristol to Bath via Mangotsfield from a base at Bitton, however after reaching Oldland Common in 1988 further extension towards Mangotsfield became impractical due to housing and transport developments. The trackbed through Mangotsfield was disused until the late 1970s when cycling charity Sustrans began to convert the route from Bristol to Bath into a cycle path. The path, built between 1979 and 1986 and known as the Bristol & Bath Railway Path, was the first major project undertaken by Sustrans, and is the oldest part of the National Cycle Network. Part of National Cycle Route 4, the path now handles over a million travellers per year.

Mangotsfield, in its Railway Path guise, is once again a junction, as a branch from the main path now heads north along the old railway alignment towards Emersons Green. The platforms provide a resting point for pedestrians and cyclists, and replica railway tickets are inlaid in the platform surface. The iron pillars which supported the glass platform canopies have been replaced with trees planted by Sustrans volunteers. The station and cycle path are now owned by South Gloucestershire Council and Sustrans. The path is lit, but only during winter months, as the lights are turned off in summer to allow glow worms to breed.

The rest of the Mangotsfield railway area has mostly been built over. The eastern part of the Mangotsfield triangle is now part of the A4174 Bristol Ring Road. The chocolate factory in the centre of the triangle was demolished in 1998 and the area, including land directly south of the station outside the triangle, is now a housing estate with chocolate- and railway-themed road names. The original station building is now a Grade II listed private house known as "Old Station Cottage", and features a small section of track with a steam locomotive and wagon on static display.

== Incidents ==
There have been a number of collisions, derailments and fatal accidents at Mangotsfield.

On 9 March 1853, there was a fatal collision between the morning mail train and another locomotive. The mail train from Gloucester – composed of a locomotive, passenger carriage, and mail van – had stopped at the station to allow the driver to adjust a loose pin on the locomotive. In dense fog, another locomotive, travelling from Gloucester to Bristol, crashed into it from behind at 25 miles per hour (40 km/h). The carriages of the mail train were smashed to pieces, with passengers thrown about. Two passengers – Thomas Jones and William Antill (Note: Sources are inconsistent as to the victims' names. While most newspaper reports call the first passenger Thomas Jones, the London Evening Standard refers to him as Samuel Jones. Similarly most reports agree the second victim was William Antill, however the Gloucester Journal refers variously to Antill or Antil, while Bell's Life in London calls the man Huntill.) – were killed, while several others suffered severe injuries. At inquest, the deaths were attributed to neglect of duty by the mail train's guard, Abraham Perkins, and the under-guard, William Maycock, as the pair had failed to exhibit danger signals once the train had stopped. The two men were indicted on charges of manslaughter, but were acquitted at the Gloucester assizes.

On 16 January 1861, a train derailed near the site of the second Mangotsfield station. A landslide, thought to have been caused by frost, dropped a large boulder to block the line towards Birmingham, causing the entire train — locomotive, luggage van and three carriages — to come off the tracks. There were no significant injuries, and the tracks were cleared within five hours.

On 23 September 1861, another collision occurred at the station. A goods train, which was being shunted into the sidings north of the station to allow a passenger train to pass, broke down while crossing the southbound track. There was no electrical telegraph system at Mangotsfield and, although efforts were made to alert signallers at Yate, an excursion train returning from Liverpool and Manchester crashed into the goods train. Three of the goods train's wagons were derailed, and twelve passengers aboard the excursion train were injured, including one severely.

Another collision occurred on 30 August 1886, at the site of the first station. A goods train from the north had shunted onto the line towards Bath, on the eastern side of the Mangotsfield triangle. An excursion train from Cheltenham and Gloucester, heading for Weston-super-Mare, was arriving from the north and heading west into the station. As it was passing the junction, the goods train began to back out onto the main line. The locomotive and first few carriages of the excursion train, which was heavily laden, passed without incident, however after this the rear of the goods train fouled the main line. The last goods van grazed the rest of the excursion train's carriages, smashing the coaches' steps and damaging the side panels. The guard's van of the excursion train however had a projecting observatory box, in which the guard, James Quick, was sitting, and this hit the goods train. The observatory box and rear of the guard's van were ripped off. Quick suffered severe head wounds, while two passengers received minor injuries.

On 18 February 1926, a wagon examiner named Daniel Alway suffered a fatal accident in the sidings at Mangotsfield. Alway had been walking along the siding while a train was shunting, in the same direction he was walking, when he lurched towards the train "as though his ankle had given out, or that he had trodden on loose metalling". Alway was hit by the train and run over by it. He was rushed to the Bristol Royal Infirmary, where his lower legs were amputated, however he became septic and died from heart failure on 26 February. Another trackside worker lost their life at Mangotsfield in 1934: Albert Henry Noad, a platelayer of 35 years' experience, was clearing weeds from the side of the track when he was hit by a passing train. Coworkers stated Noad needed to be near the rails in order to do his job properly, but did not hear a shouted warning and misjudged the distance to the oncoming train. A verdict of accidental death was recorded. Further members of railway staff were hit and killed by trains in 1941, 1948 and 1949.

In 1935, two teenage boys were convicted of endangering the lives of railway passengers after they put a fishplate weighing 20 pounds (9.1 kg) on the tracks. The plate was subsequently run over by a train, causing damage to a sleeper and a wall.

Two passenger carriages derailed at Mangotsfield in 1936. The coaches were being shunted just west of the station when they became fouled on a set of points and derailed. Both coaches were empty, and there were no injuries.
