= Staple Hill railway station =

Former railway station in England

Coordinates: 51.4792°N 2.5138°W

Staple Hill
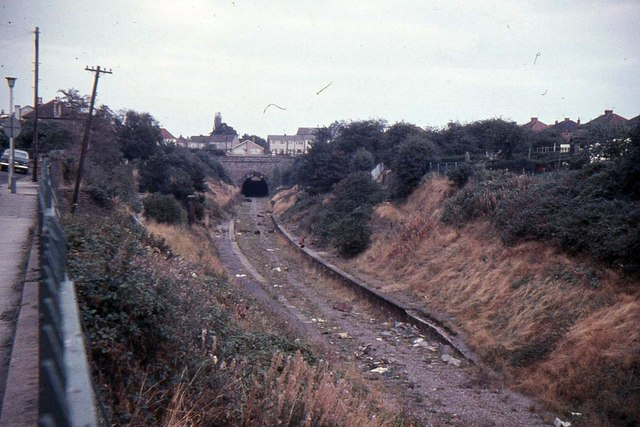
- Staple Hill railway station in 1967

General information
- Location: Staple Hill, South Gloucestershire, South Gloucestershire; England
- Grid reference: ST644757
- Platforms: 2

Other information
- Status: Disused

History
- Pre-grouping: Midland Railway
- Post-grouping: London, Midland and Scottish Railway; London Midland Region of British Railways

Key dates
- 1 November 1888: Opened
- 7 March 1966: Closed
Location

Staple Hill railway station was on the Midland Railway line between Bristol and Gloucester on the outskirts of Bristol. The station was on the Bristol and Gloucester Railway line, but opened in 1888, 44 years after the line had been opened through the site. It served the Victorian suburban developments in the area to the south of Mangotsfield.

Staple Hill was served by stopping trains between Bristol and Gloucester and also by trains between Bristol and Bath that used the Mangotsfield and Bath Branch Line. Set in a cutting and with a tunnel at the east end of the station, it had difficult access and was approach by zigzag paths down the cutting embankment. The station buildings were in Gloucestershire, but the platforms extended inside the Bristol city boundary.

No goods facilities were ever provided at Staple Hill, but the station was well-used by commuters to Bristol and north to the factories at Mangotsfield. Services between Bristol and Gloucester were withdrawn on 4 January 1965 and between Bristol and Bath on 7 March 1966, when the station closed. The line through the station was due to close on 3 January 1970, with services between Bristol and Gloucester diverted to the former Great Western Railway route via Filton Junction, but a landslip at Staple Hill a week before closure meant the diversion came into effect early. The route is now part of a cycle path and one of the platforms is still visible.

== Services ==
Preceding station	Disused railways	Following station
Fishponds; Line and station closed	Bristol and Gloucester Railway; Midland Railway	Mangotsfield; Line and station closed
