= Page Park =

Page Park may refer to:

- Page Park, Bristol
- Page Park, Florida
