= Staple Hill, Gloucestershire =

Human settlement in Bristol, England

Coordinates: 51.479755°N 2.502025°W

Staple Hill
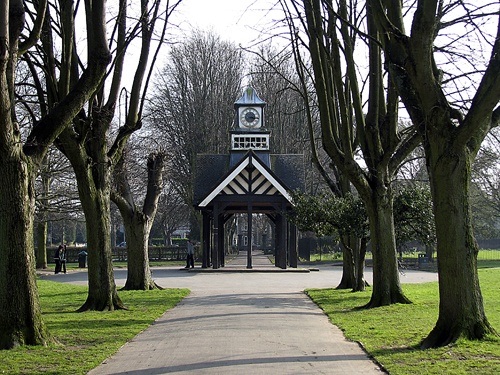
- A view of Page Park in Staple Hill

- Location within Gloucestershire
- Population: 6,823 (census 2001)
- Civil parish: Staple Hill and Mangotsfield
- Unitary authority: South Gloucestershire
- Ceremonial county: Gloucestershire
- Region: South West
- Country: England
- Sovereign state: United Kingdom
- Post town: BRISTOL
- Postcode district: BS16
- Dialling code: 0117
- Police: Avon and Somerset
- Fire: Avon
- Ambulance: South Western
- UK Parliament: Bristol North East

Staple Hill is a suburb of Bristol, England, lying outside the city boundary in South Gloucestershire, in the ceremonial county of Gloucestershire. It is directly east of Fishponds, south of Downend, west of Mangotsfield and north of Soundwell.

== History ==
Staple is a rendering of the Anglo-Saxon/Old English word stapol or staypole which meant a post in the sense of an old boundary marker.

The settlement of Staple Hill developed in the 19th century. It was a hamlet in the ancient parish of Mangotsfield. Staple Hill was once within the ancient forest of Kingswood. This prevented by law of royal privilege anyone settling within the Royal Forest of Kingswood.

=== Development of the suburb and community ===
The modern settlement of Staple Hill originated in the 18th century by when forest law had become largely anachronistic and the wild boar and wolves which once made the forest dangerous were long since extinct (see Royal Forest). Expansion of the settlement was facilitated after 1888 when the Midland Railway opened Staple Hill railway station, giving direct access to Bristol and Gloucester, and also to Bath by the Mangotsfield and Bath branch line. The Bath line of the Midland Railway involved the construction of a beautifully engineered tunnel deep under the hill at Staple Hill. After this investment, Staple Hill grew beyond a small hamlet and gained tram and bus links with Bristol that allowed it to become a residence for commuters to Bristol or Bath. The station closed in 1966.

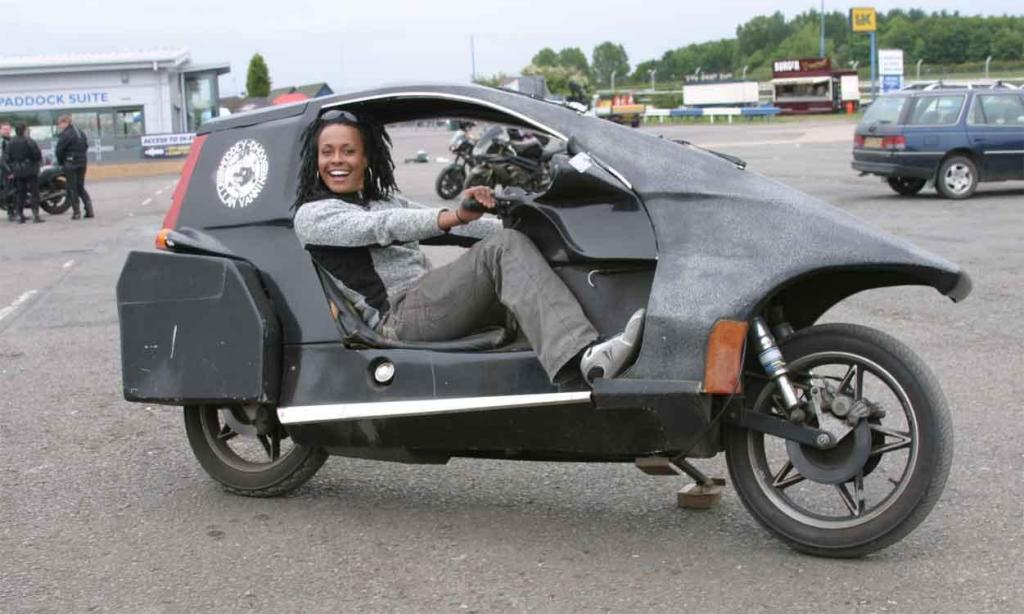
Broadcaster Jane Omorogbe in a Quasar

Staple Hill briefly became a centre for engineering, with Wilson and Sons Engineering designing and assembling Quasar (motorcycle)s. This was a recumbent motorcycle built in small numbers which is today widely recognised as the first modern feet-forward motorcycle design.

== Staple Hill today ==
Staple Hill has a wide-ranging high street, and the architecture is largely Victorian with ornate roof ridges and eaves, attractive decorative brickwork and architectural features in stonemasonry. The High Street is broad as trams originally ran along its length.

Page Park, which has been improved by volunteers from the community in recent years, celebrated its 100-year anniversary in 2010.

An event known as "Christmas on the Hill" takes place on the first Saturday in December during which entertainments along the main street take place with music, stall holders, treasure hunts and performances.

The railway line and the station site have been converted to the Bristol & Bath Railway cycle route, one of the Sustrans National Cycle routes. For a minor section in the central part of the ward, the path runs through Staple Hill tunnel as the land rises in this section, allowing for the hill above.

== Governance ==
Between 1927 and 1974 Staple Hill was part of Mangotsfield Urban District. Between 1974 and 1996 it was part of Kingswood Borough in the county of Avon when it became part of South Gloucestershire, between 1974 and 2023 it was in Mangotsfield unparished area, on 1 April 2023 it became part of Staple Hill and Mangotsfield civil parish.

The area forms the Staple Hill ward of South Gloucestershire. The elections on 7 May 2015 returned two Labour Party Councillors, Shirley Potts and Ian Boulton.
