= Midland Bridge =

Bridge in Bath, Somerset, England

Coordinates: 51°22′50″N 2°22′10″W

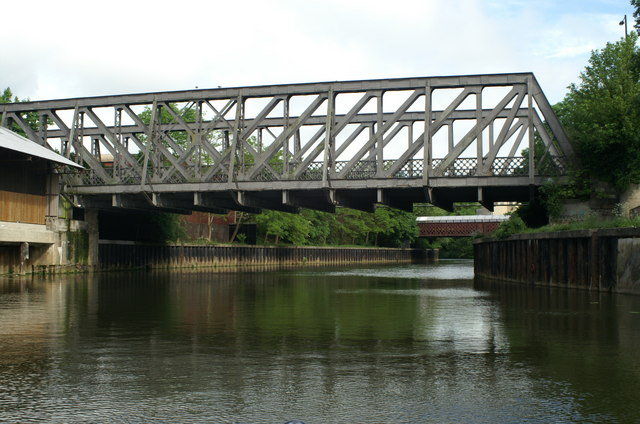
Midland Bridge over the River Avon

The Midland Bridge is a road bridge over the River Avon in Bath, Somerset, England, now carrying the B3118 road. It was originally built in 1870 by the Midland Railway Company to allow access to and from their goods station at Sydenham Field on the south bank of the river Avon, the opposite bank to the passenger Green Park terminus station and the city centre.

== History ==
The Midland Railway's Mangotsfield and Bath branch line opened to a temporary passenger terminus on the south side of the Avon on 4 July 1869; the railway bridge and the new permanent passenger station were built in the early months of 1870, and the road bridge followed by the middle of the year. The two bridges and the station were designed by John Holloway Sanders and engineered by Messrs Allport Jnr and Wilson, and the original road bridge resembled the railway bridge – which still exists – but without a central pier in the middle of the river. The railway complex on the south side of the river became more important in 1874 with the opening of the Bath extension of the Somerset and Dorset Railway. But the new bridge also provided an important road link between the centre of Bath and the late Victorian suburbs to the south and west such as Oldfield Park and Twerton.

The current Midland Bridge dates from 1905. The original bridge was replaced under a deal done between the city corporation and the Bath Electric Tramways Company, in which the tramways company paid a total of £16,400 for various road improvements around Bath that would assist the expansion and electrification of its tram system. The new bridge was built by the Derby foundry company Handyside and Co., and was 36 feet wide, against the 20 feet of the original, which also allowed two pavements to be provided where there had been only one before. The tram company's interest was in providing a new access route from Twerton and Oldfield Park to the city centre via the bridge, Kingsmead Square and Westgate Street; the bridge was built with a single line of tram tracks in place. But although the city council gave permission and the mayor was very encouraging at the bridge's opening, the tram scheme did not materialise and the single track was eventually removed.

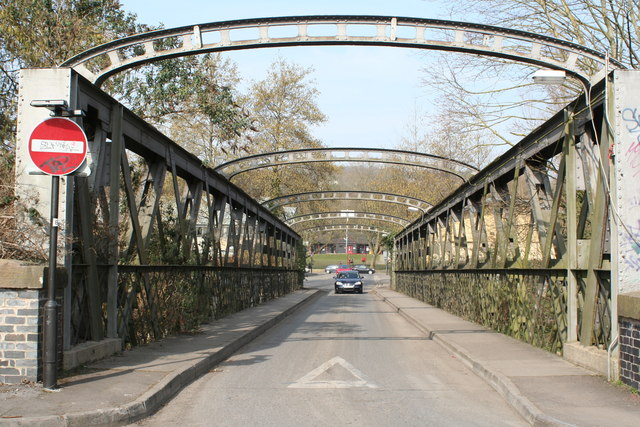
Original Midland Bridge, resited as the Destructor Bridge in Bath, as seen in 2013

The original bridge was re-used to provide a link between the old 'scavenger's yard' and the new 'Destructor' incinerator across the Avon further to the west of the city. This relocation and reconstruction was undertaken by the engineer John Cambridge. It was replaced by a new bridge in 2016, though not opened to vehicles until 2020.

The Midland Bridge now carries the B3118 road, which is one of the main inner city road crossings over the River Avon. A major refurbishment of the bridge was carried out in 2015.
