= Kingswood Borough Council elections =

Local government elections in Avon, England

Kingswood was a non-metropolitan district in Avon, England. It was abolished on 1 April 1996 and replaced by South Gloucestershire.

== Political control ==
From the first election to the council in 1973 until its abolition in 1996, political control of the council was held by the following parties:

Party in control	Years
No overall control	1973–1983
Conservative	1983–1991
Labour	1991–1996

== Council elections ==
- 1973 Kingswood District Council election
- 1976 Kingswood District Council election (New ward boundaries)
- 1979 Kingswood District Council election
- 1983 Kingswood District Council election
- 1987 Kingswood Borough Council election (New ward boundaries)
- 1991 Kingswood Borough Council election
