= Bristol and Bath Railway Path =

Footpath and cycle route in England

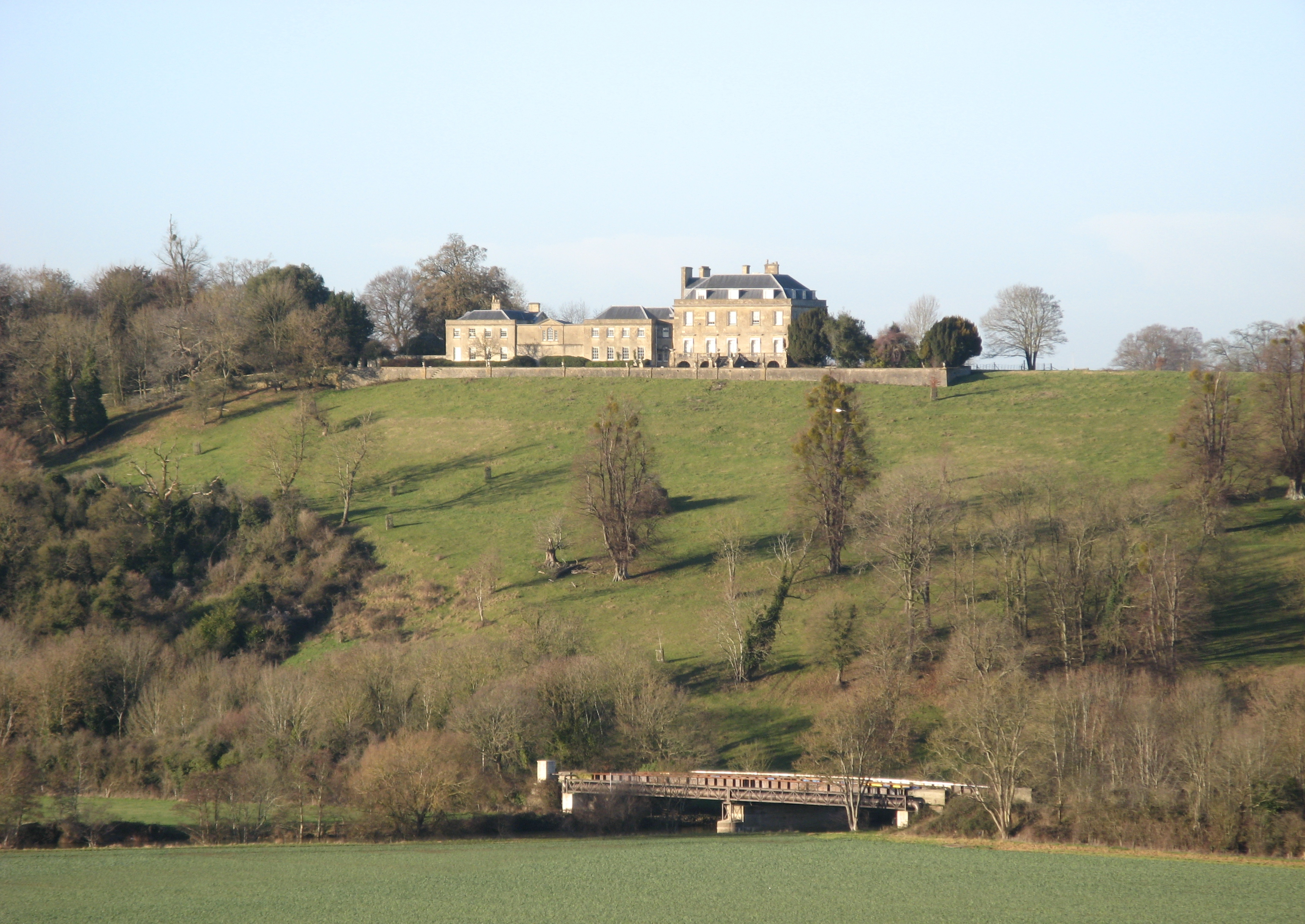
The Bristol and Bath railway path crossing the River Avon near Kelston Park

Route map of the path

The Bristol and Bath Railway Path is a 15-mile (24 km) footpath and off-road cycleway, part of National Cycle Network National Cycle Route 4. It has a 3-metre (9.8 ft) wide tarmacked surface, and was used for 2.4 million trips in 2007, increasing by 10% per year.

It was built by the cycling charity Sustrans between 1979 and 1986, which leased a five-mile (8.0 km) stretch near Saltford, with the help of the then Avon County Council, and using volunteers turned it into its first cycleway.

== Route ==
The path follows the route of the Midland Railway Mangotsfield and Bath branch line, which was closed during the Beeching Axe of the 1960s in favour of the more direct former Great Western Railway between the cities, from Lawrence Hill in central Bristol to Newbridge in Bath. It passes through the suburbs of Easton, Fishponds, and Staple Hill, then the villages of Mangotsfield, Warmley, Bitton and Saltford, before ending at Newbridge.

=== Bristol end ===
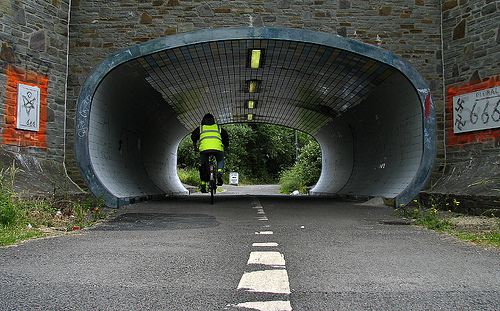
The Bristol and Bath railway path passes under Station Road in Fishponds, Bristol.

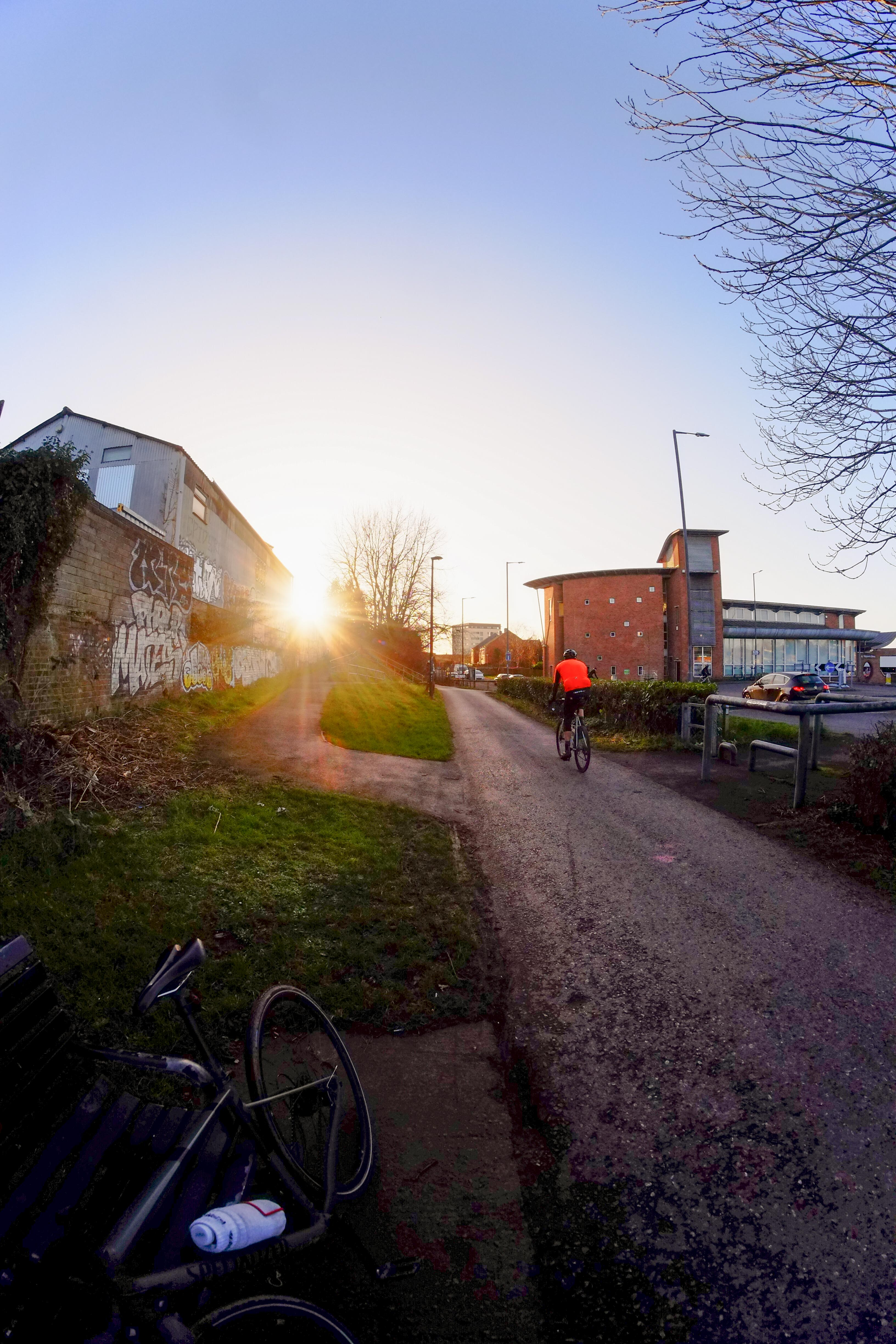
Looking down towards Bristol City Centre from the Fishponds segment of the railway path

The path starts at Trinity Street, Lawrence Hill. 51.456104°N 2.575019°W

=== Clay Bottom ===
A housing development at Clay Bottom (near the B4469) has encroached onto the alignment of the railway, and the cycleway diverts around several houses causing a blind corner. These houses would be in the way of any future use of this section as a guided busway or rail use.

=== Staple Hill ===
3.2 miles from the Bristol end, the path reaches Staple Hill station. On the remaining platform there is a modern sculptured seat. The path rises up level with the platform, and then drops back down to the track bed.

A short distance from the station is the entrance to the 0.3-mile-long Staple Hill Tunnel under Staple Hill. The west end of the tunnel is at 51.4792°N 2.51126°W, the east end at 51.4789°N 2.50439°W. The path takes up less than half the width of the tunnel, with the rest of the floor uneven rocks. The tunnel is lit all year-round, and despite the warning signs, 24 hours a day. The roof leaks in places, giving the appearance of rain, often when outside it is dry.

=== Mangotsfield station ===
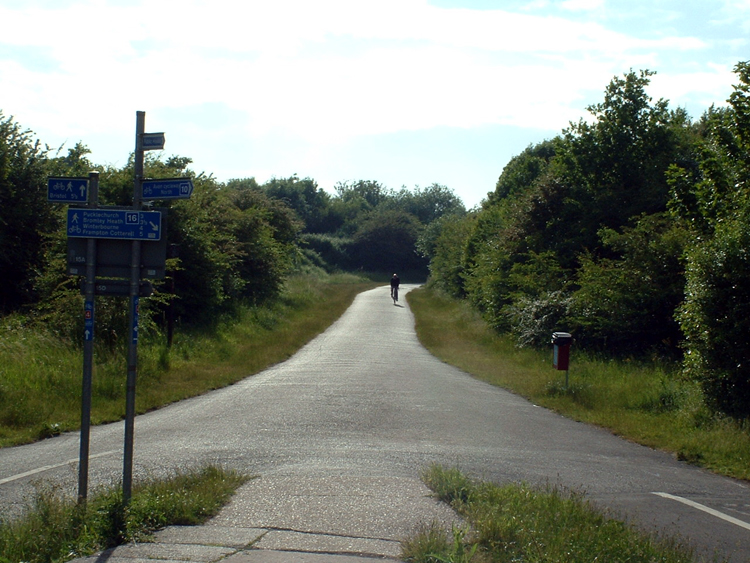
The Bristol & Bath Railway Path, looking towards Bristol from the former Mangotsfield railway station

Mangotsfield railway station 51.4757°N 2.4830°W was on the Midland Railway Bristol and Gloucester main line, the junction for the Mangotsfield and Bath Branch Line to Bath Green Park railway station. It had six platforms.

The disused Bristol and Gloucester route to Yate now provides a spur from the railway path northwest to the Bristol ring road cycle path and Emersons Green.

The remaining island platforms have railway-related sculptures between them, some depicting waiting passengers. One notable sculpture was that of a suitcase, supposedly belonging to one of the passengers. However, it disappeared in the summer of 2008.

=== Avon ring road ===
From 1999 to July 2001 South Gloucestershire Council built a new section of the A4174 Avon ring road along part of the path. While the work was being undertaken the path was diverted away from the old railway line and a new section was added around the ring road, increasing the length by 200 yards. The new section includes two bridges, several tight corners, a hill (South Gloucestershire Council describes it as a 'barely perceptible gradient'), and two cattle grids.

=== Warmley station ===
The station platform at Warmley contains a cafe, serving refreshments seven days a week year-round, and includes public toilets.

=== Avon Valley Railway ===
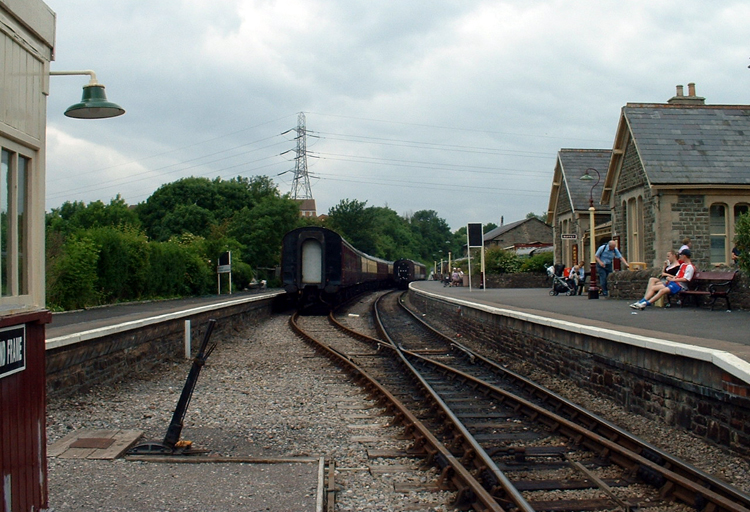
Bitton railway station taken from the path

Between Avon Riverside and Oldland Common the path shares its route with the heritage Avon Valley Railway. Along this two-mile shared section the path crosses the railway line at two level crossings. There has been opposition to the Avon Valley Railway expanding their line, demonstrated by the painting of graffiti along the path where it runs parallel with the line.

The railway's cafe at Bitton railway station is open all year round.

=== Bath end ===
The end of the path is at the Brassmill Lane trading estate in Bath. 51.385498°N 2.400456°W The west Bath riverside path continues to the city centre.

== Sculpture ==
As of 2007 there were 26 commissioned artworks along the Path.

Bristol to Bath Railway Path Sculptures
Picture	Location	Title	Artist	Notes
	St Phillips Road, Bristol	Twisted Archway	Cod Steaks	
	Lawrence Hill	Dancing Drum	Steve Joyce	
	Fishponds	Fish on its nose	Doug Cocker	
	Mangotsfield	Sentinel I&II	Jim Paulsen	
	Warmley Station	Waiting	Steve Joyce	
	Near Warmley	Gaius Sentius	Gordon Young	

== Guided busway proposal ==
In January 2008, a plan was revealed by the West of England Partnership to turn sections of the path between Emersons Green and Bristol City Centre into a Guided Busway. Sustrans have announced that they will oppose these plans, claiming that they are the "right idea, wrong route".

A petition against this proposal on Bristol City Council's website gained over 7900 signatures within the first month. A website was set up by a group opposed to the plans. In a council meeting on 1 April, plans for the busway were put on hold, but the council refused to rule out using the path for a busway later.

== Rapid transit proposal ==
It is suggested that the eastern route of a proposed Bristol rapid transit system could run as a light rail track alongside the Bristol and Bath Railway Path, which would not have to close.
