= Kingswood Borough =

Former borough in the United Kingdom

Coordinates: 51.4624°N 2.5039°W

Kingswood
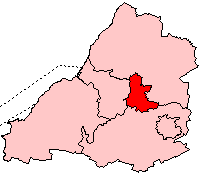
- Kingswood District within the County of Avon
- Area
  - 1974: 11,831 acres (47.88 km^{2})
- Population
  - 1973: 78,210
  - 1992: 91,200
- History
  - Created: 1 April 1974
  - Abolished: 31 March 1996
  - Succeeded by: South Gloucestershire
- Status: Borough
- Government
  - HQ: Kingswood
  - Motto: Vigilando Custodimus (We are the watchful custodians)

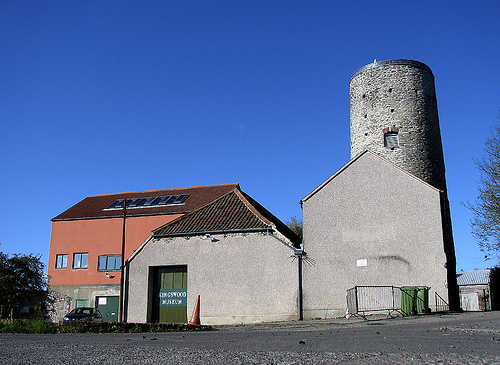
Kingswood Museum

Kingswood was, from 1974 to 1996, a non-metropolitan district of the county of Avon, England.

The district was formed by the Local Government Act 1972 on 1 April 1974 as part of a reform of local authorities throughout England and Wales. Under the reorganisation, the area surrounding the cities of Bath and Bristol was formed into a new county of "Avon", named after the river that runs through the area. The county was divided into six districts, one of which was formed from the areas of Kingswood and Mangotsfield urban districts with Warmley Rural District, all within the administrative county of Gloucestershire. On 20 May 1987 the district was granted borough status.

Following a review by the Local Government Commission for England, both the county of Avon and Borough of Kingswood were abolished on 1 April 1996. Kingswood was merged with the neighbouring Northavon district to form the unitary authority of South Gloucestershire.

== See also ==
- Kingswood Borough Council elections
