= Bristol and Gloucestershire Railway =

Railway line in England

The Bristol and Gloucestershire Railway was an early mineral railway, opened in two stages in 1832 and 1834, which connected collieries near Coalpit Heath with Bristol, at the river Avon. Horse traction was used. It was later taken over by the Bristol and Gloucester Railway, and much of the route became part of the main line between Birmingham and Bristol, though that was later by-passed and closed. Part of it now forms the Bristol and Bath Railway Path.

== Origins ==
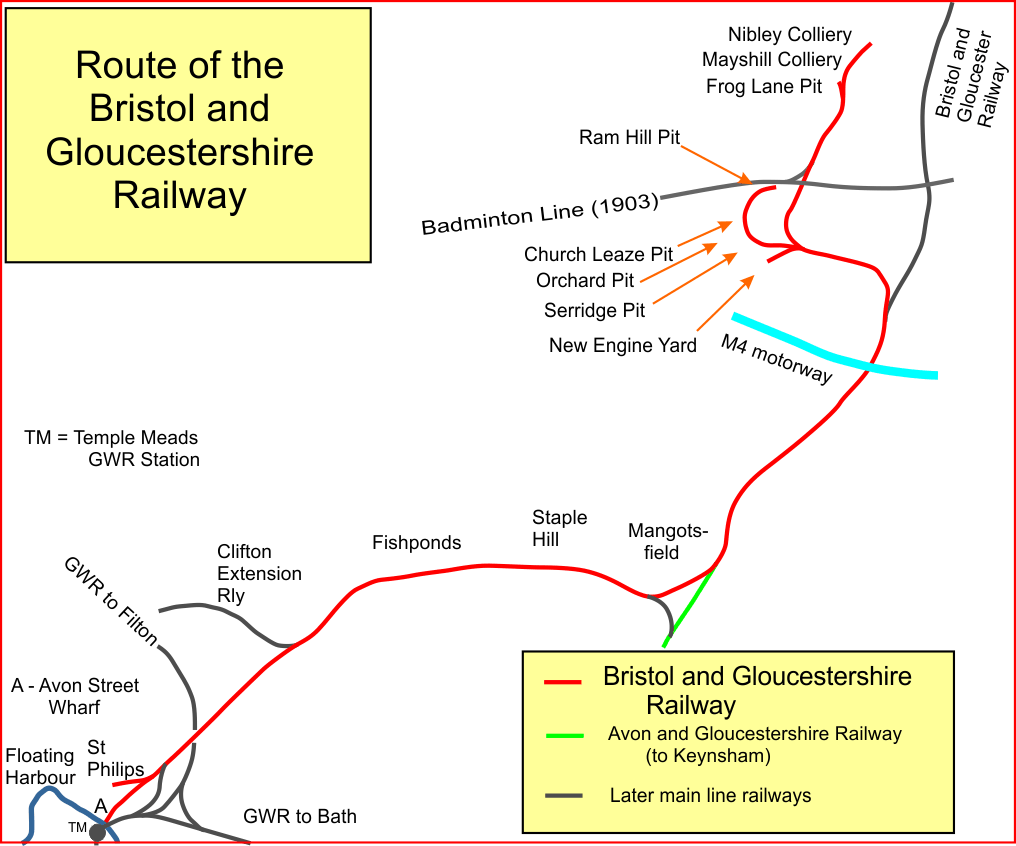
Bristol and Gloucestershire Railway Route Diagram

As a large and flourishing city, Bristol had a huge demand for coal, for domestic use and industrial purposes, in the latter part of the eighteenth century; although there were some limited coal resources in the immediate area, a more fruitful source of coal was in the district called Coalpit Heath, north-east of the city. Before the era of reliable roads, transport of the mineral to Bristol was difficult and expensive, and this seriously limited commercial activity.

A number of attempts were made over several years to have a form of guided transport—a wooden wagonway or a tramway—built, but nothing was successful until on 27 October 1827 a meeting of interested businessmen resolved to form a company to build a double line of railway between Bristol and Coalpit Heath. The cost was considered to be £49,727; a single line would be about £9,000 less. The meeting adopted a proposal from the Kennet and Avon Canal Company that a branch should be added to the River Avon (with which the canal connected) near Keynsham. It appears that the meeting decided to make the Keynsham line a separate undertaking, heavily sponsored by the Canal company, and that line became the Avon and Gloucestershire Railway.

The line was to be called the Bristol and Gloucestershire Railway, but in the early days it seems to have been referred to also as the Coalpit Heath Railway. The engineer W. H. Townsend was appointed as surveyor and engineer, and he prepared a formal estimate for a single line from Cuckold's Pill in Bristol to Orchard Pit at Coalpit Heath, in the sum of £41,819 14s 2d. (In fact the construction cost about double that sum.)

Bristol and Gloucester Railway Act 1828
- Act of Parliament
- Parliament of the United Kingdom
- Long title: An Act for making and maintaining a Railway or Tram Road from or near the City of Bristol to Coalpit Heath in the Parish of Westerleigh in the County of Gloucester.
- Citation: 9 Geo. 4. c. xciii

Dates
- Royal assent: 19 June 1828

Text of statute as originally enacted

The scheme received the royal assent for its act of Parliament, the Bristol and Gloucester Railway Act 1828 (9 Geo. 4. c. xciii), on 19 June 1828, with a share capital of £45,000 and borrowing powers of £12,000. By now the Avon and Gloucestershire Railway was being actively promoted, forming a separate connection from the Avon near Keynsham, and the branch that had been suggested earlier was dropped from the Bristol proposals.

The Bristol and Gloucester Railway Act 1828 laid down maximum tolls for conveying minerals and other goods on the line, wharfage and cranage.

== Construction ==
At this late time it was decided to build the line for double track, while only single track. Tenders for the earthworks were advertised in January 1829 and by August 1830 the route was ready for tenders for the trackwork to be invited.

The northern half of the line, from Mangotsfield to Coalpit Heath, was opened in July 1832; this enabled the Avon and Gloucestershire Railway to convey coal from the mines to the River Avon; it had been a condition of some of the subscription that priority would be given to this section.

By now the available money was nearly exhausted, and a further act of Parliament, the Bristol and Gloucester Railway Act 1834 (4 & 5 Will. 4. c. ii), authorised the raising of a further £20,000, and work continued on the southern section of the line.

This opened on 6 August 1835 with a gala procession by horse-drawn train, which covered the nine miles in three hours.

== Track ==
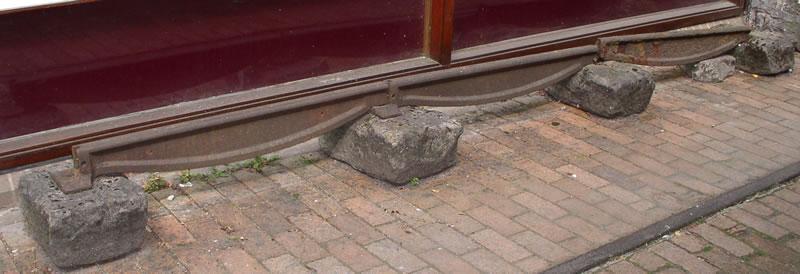
Fishbelly rail from the Cromford and High Peak line

The track gauge was 4 ft 8 in (1,422 mm) (Note: Apparently not the later 4 ft 8 1/2 in (1,435 mm) standard gauge.) The edge rail was in 15-foot (4.57 m) sections of malleable cast iron at 35 pounds per yard (17.4 kg/m), with five fish-belly webs. (Note: Not a parallel section as with modern rail; each 15 ft (4.57 m) rail had five fish-belly segments, each one between the support points) The rails were supported on stone blocks, being held in iron chairs. Some of the stone blocks were obtained from the Avon and Gloucestershire company's quarry near Keynsham.

== Operations ==
The railway was operated as a toll highway, with private carriers and traders operating on the line and paying a toll based on tonnage and distance. Toll rates and distance posts had to be provided. Regulations specified the general dimensions of permitted wagons. Neighbouring proprietors were permitted to make siding connections to the railway, subject to certain regulations.

As a horse-operated railway, there was no signalling system, and the level crossings did not have gates. There were several passing places—known as turnouts—on the single line, and the uphill direction was given a straight path, the downhill taking the deviation onto the turnout. There were regulations as to which "train" should have priority when opposing movements met; if two trains met at a turnout, the downhill one (Note: Maggs refers to the movements towards Bristol; at the northern end of the line the gradient rises towards Bristol, and it is not certain whether the rules took this into account, if there was a turnout on this section) destined for Bristol took the turnout; if they met between turnouts, the uphill train set back to the previous turnout. Horse drawn trains generally had to give way to steam-hauled trains, and to go into a turnout to be overtaken by them.

In 1835 the company had discussed whether to provide steam locomotives, but there is no evidence that they actually did so. (The independent hauliers provided their own horse traction, so if the company had provided motive power, this would have changed the nature of the railway.) A letter written by a colliery proprietor suggests a toll rate for locomotives, but the primitive technology available at the time made this a daunting proposition and it is not known whether any locomotive actually ran.

== Route description ==
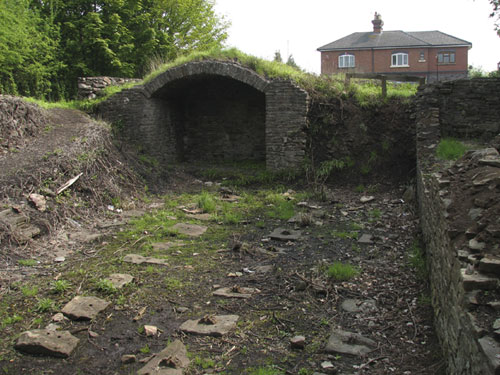
Stone block track remains at Ram Hill Colliery

The railway was designed to bring coal down from an area described as "Coalpit Heath" to Bristol. As its name suggests, Coalpit Heath was a district with several actual pits. There was a northern group, which included Nibley Colliery, Mayshill (or Mays Hill) Colliery and Frog Lane Pit. Although coal had been extracted from this area well before the B&GlosR was built, it appears (Note: Maggs does not show their connecting branch line on his route diagram at all; "Kingswood Coal" implies on pages 13 and 14 that they were enlarged from 1852, having previously been small-scale workings.) that they were small scale workings when the B&GlosR was built, and that the line was extended to serve them after 1852 when they were enlarged.

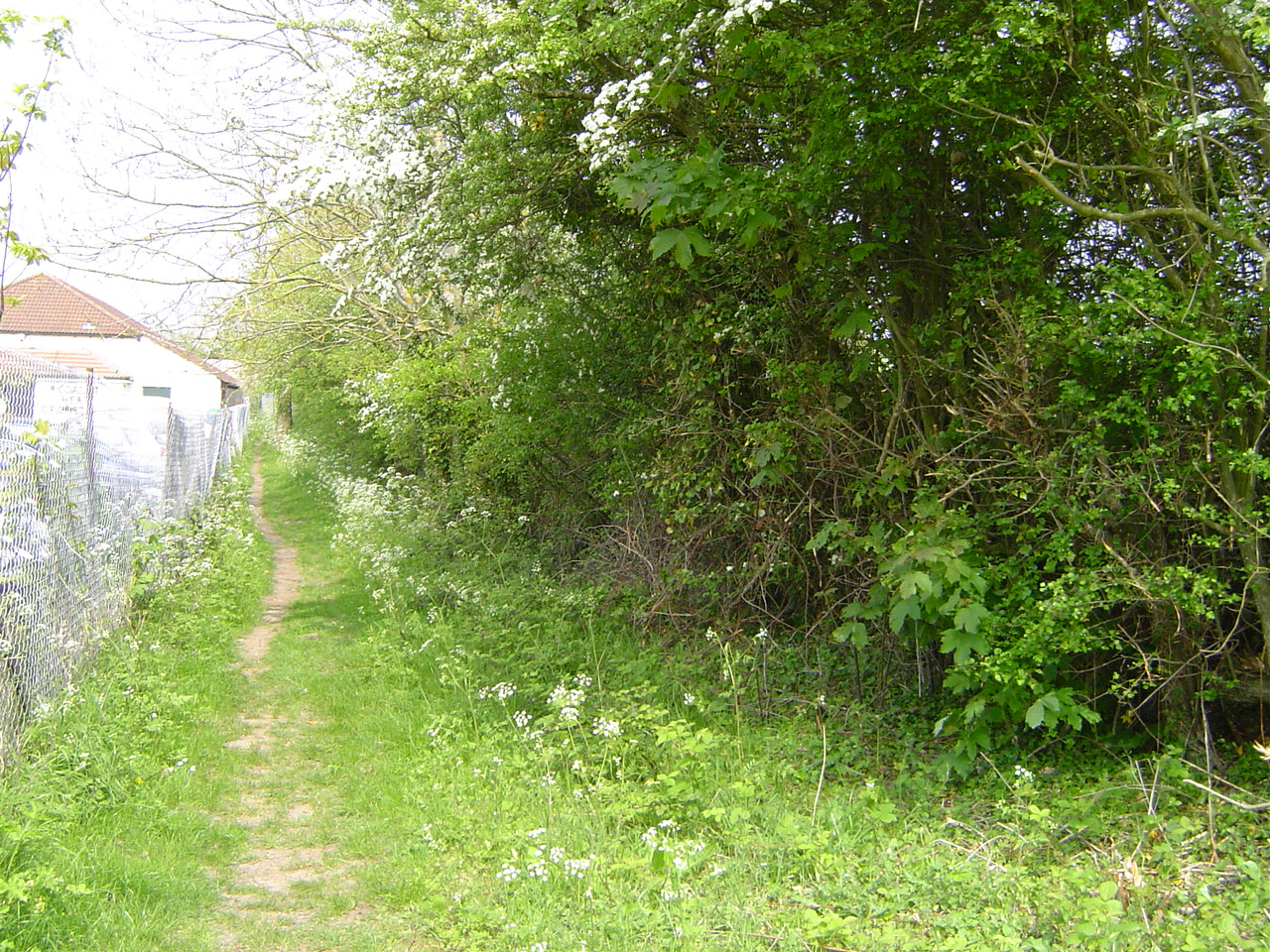
The route of the railway passing Coalpit Heath Cricket Club premises

A southern group consisted of Ram Hill Pit, Church Leaze Pit, Serridge Pit and New Engine Yard to the south, and these were served by the northern extremity of the original line. Having connected all these pits, the line ran east to maintain a steady gradient, and then south to the point that became Mangotsfield North Junction, and then west to Staple Hill, where there was a tunnel, 518 yards long. It then passed through Fishponds, then turning south-west passing Lawrence Hill to Avon Street Wharf, on the Floating Harbour at Bristol. The location was called Cuckold's Pill, but on late nineteenth century maps it is called Avon Street or Avonside Wharf. The location of this terminal was immediately west of the point at which the Great Western Railway crossed the Floating Harbour, at the eastern end of the later Temple Meads station, and on the north side of the Floating Harbour. The line crossed Avon Street on the level, and fanned into wharf sidings.

There was a diverging branch to St Philips shortly before arrival at the Avon Street wharf.

The original specification of the line had Orchard Pit as its northern point. By the period 1891–1893, the northernmost pit served was Nibley Colliery, with a total of seven pits served in the vicinity.

== Collieries ==
=== Ram Hill group ===
Coal was being extracted in the Coalpit Heath area as early as 1620. A deep drainage shaft was sunk at Ram Hill (see diagram) in 1783, at National Grid Reference (NGR) ST676802; a beam engine raised ground water; the shaft was eventually extended to 55 fathoms. Another drainage shaft was sunk at Serridge (47 fathoms, NGR ST675796) at what became called Serridge Engine Pit. A winding shaft was sunk at Orchard (or Middle Whimsey) at NGR ST673796, and later another at Ram Hill, NGR ST679802.

Later, about 1825, New Engine shaft was sunk at NGR ST678794, and this later became a supply and maintenance are for the whole group of collieries, taking the name New Engine Yard. This was followed by the shaft at Church Leaze, NGR ST676798.

This group of pits closed in the 1860s, leaving New Engine Yard as a maintenance and supply depot for the more northerly collieries.

=== Nibley group ===
Somewhat to the north of this group were Nibley, at NGR ST692820, and a later development at Frog Lane at NGR ST687816 in about 1852. Mays Hill at NGR ST690819 is believed to have been sunk in about 1780 but was enlarged in 1847. These pits became considerably more productive from the 1860s, and were connected to the mineral line after its takeover by the Midland Railway. Frog Lane production peaked about 1891 and the pit was drowned out in 1949.

=== The Parkfield group ===
In the area south of the present M4 motorway, there were several abandoned 18th century shafts. From 1851 Handel Cossham reopened some pits he believed had reserves; these were Brandybottom, at NGR ST682771 and Cooks at NGR ST692777. He also developed a new engine pit at Parkfield, NGR ST689778, from 1858. This was followed by the re-opening of Brandybottom at NGR ST682771. All of these were apparently connected to the B&GlosR line.

A little further south was Shortwood Colliery at about NGR ST680763, which had a branch line to serve it, about half a mile (800 m) long. Between these was a system called South Parkfield, also with a siding system.

== Expansion and takeover ==
Notwithstanding the limitations of the line, the proprietors' thoughts turned to an extension to Gloucester; at this time a Birmingham and Gloucester Railway was under consideration, and there was the attractive prospect of through communication to the manufacturing districts of that city. The Bristol and Gloucestershire company issued a prospectus proposing the extension, but its bill failed in Parliament in the 1838 session.

Bristol and Gloucestershire Railway Act 1839
- Act of Parliament
- Parliament of the United Kingdom
- Long title: An Act for altering and extending the Line of the Bristol and Gloucestershire Railway and for amending the Acts relating thereto.
- Citation: 2 & 3 Vict. c. lvi

Dates
- Royal assent: 1 July 1839

Text of statute as originally enacted

The Great Western Railway (GWR) considered the project to be complementary to its network, and put £50,000 towards the scheme, and a new bill was presented to Parliament, this time getting approved; the Bristol and Gloucestershire Railway Act 1839 (2 & 3 Vict. c. lvi) was given royal assent on 1 July 1839; this established a Bristol and Gloucester Railway Company, which was authorised to absorb the Bristol and Gloucestershire Railway, and to extend its line from a junction at Westerleigh, 2 miles south of Coalpit Heath, and to run from there to Standish Junction, a distance of 21 1/2 miles. At Standish the route would join a line from Swindon to Gloucester and Cheltenham, the Cheltenham and Great Western Union Railway (C&GWUR); that railway, friendly to the GWR, was already under construction.

The C&GWUR was a broad gauge (7 ft 0 1/4 in) railway, and the Bristol and Gloucester Railway would have to negotiate with that company to add a third rail from Standish to Gloucester to enable standard gauge trains to run. However, section 3 of the Bristol and Gloucestershire Railway Act 1839 repealed the mandatory use of the 4 ft 8 in gauge on the Bristol and Gloucestershire company's route.

On 11 July 1839 the Bristol and Gloucester Railway held its first meeting, taking over the affairs of the Bristol and Gloucestershire company.

== Subsequent history ==
=== Main line ===
The new Bristol and Gloucester Railway company continued to operate the original line, while constructing its new line, which opened on 8 July 1844. At the insistence of the GWR, the gauge was changed to the broad gauge throughout, obviating the laying of the third rail from Standish, but creating a vexatious break of gauge at Gloucester, where goods had to be physically transshipped between wagons of the respective gauges.

The line was later converted back to standard gauge, and the Midland Railway took over the route, which became part of their main line between Bristol and Birmingham.

Rationalisation of the main Bristol and Gloucester line followed in the 1960s; an alternative route between Bristol and Yate existed and it was developed as the sole main line towards Gloucester; practically all of the original Bristol and Gloucestershire route was closed.

=== Connecting collieries near Coalpit Heath ===
The gauge change to broad gauge required the B&GlosR colliery connections to be converted too. This was done in 1847 at a cost of £1,450. However the section from New Engine to Ram Hill was never converted, having probably been closed before that date. A weighbridge near New Engine Yard (at NGR ST683795) was broad gauge, with a third rail bolted on to deal with standard gauge wagons. It survived in situ until 1960.

The northernmost end of the B&GlosR line to Nibley Colliery was crossed by the Great Western Railway's direct line between Swindon and Patchway (the "Badminton Line"). A connection was provided from the new Coalpit Heath station to the Nibley mineral line. Siding accommodation on the up side at Coalpit Heath was provided for the purpose. An agreement was concluded on 8 October 1903 between Dame Emily Francis Smith and Charles Colston, owners of the Coalpit Heath Colliery Company. A gate separated the colliery sidings from the (former B&GlosR) mineral line.

Robertson and Abbott give more detail:

The name "Coalpit Heath Coal Co." (Note: Robertson and Abbott give "Colliery Co" in the text and "Coal Co." in a footnote on the same page.) (Ltd. from 1900 to 1926) collectively applied to three collieries, Froglane, Mayshill, and Nibley, which are known to have been producing coal prior to 1832. A mile-long branch from the MR to the workings was provided in 1846. [This must mean from near New Engine Yard northwards.]

At least five private locomotives are known to have worked the colliery lines as follows:

- 0-4-0T built by Fletcher Jennings in 1866
- 0-6-0ST built by Fox Walker in 1876
- Lord Roberts, 0-6-0ST built by Peckett in 1900
- Lord Salisbury 0-6-0ST built by Peckett in 1906
- Four-wheel diesel mechanical built by Ruston Hornsby in 1946

There is no record that any of these engines were registered to work over GWR metals at Coalpit Heath station for shunting or access purposes. Similarly it is not known if any private owner wagons existed.

Mitchell and Smith show a photograph of the bridge, which had two spans: one for the through line and one for a siding. The National Coal Board closed Frog Lane pit and Mayshill Colliery by 1949.

The other mine (Nibley) continued to have rail access until 1953 and the branch was used for wgon storage until 1956.

== Modern leisure use ==
Much of the route, including Staple Hill Tunnel, has been made a cycle path and footpath, the Bristol and Bath Railway Path.

Parts of the northern end of the route have also been converted into a footpath, referred to as the Dramway

== The word dramway ==
In his book, Lawson refers throughout to both the Bristol and Gloucestershire Railway and the Avon and Gloucestershire Railway as "the Dramway", and he also uses the word generically, still with capitalisation, for example, "With the metamorphosis of the B&GR from a horse-drawn Dramway to a full-blown steam-driven broad-gauge railway ..." Nowhere in the book does he explain the origin of the word. The council use the word on signage locally. There are many theories about the origin and usage of the word, but few of these have documented proof.
