= Pines Express =

Former passenger train between Manchester and Bournemouth, England (1910-67)

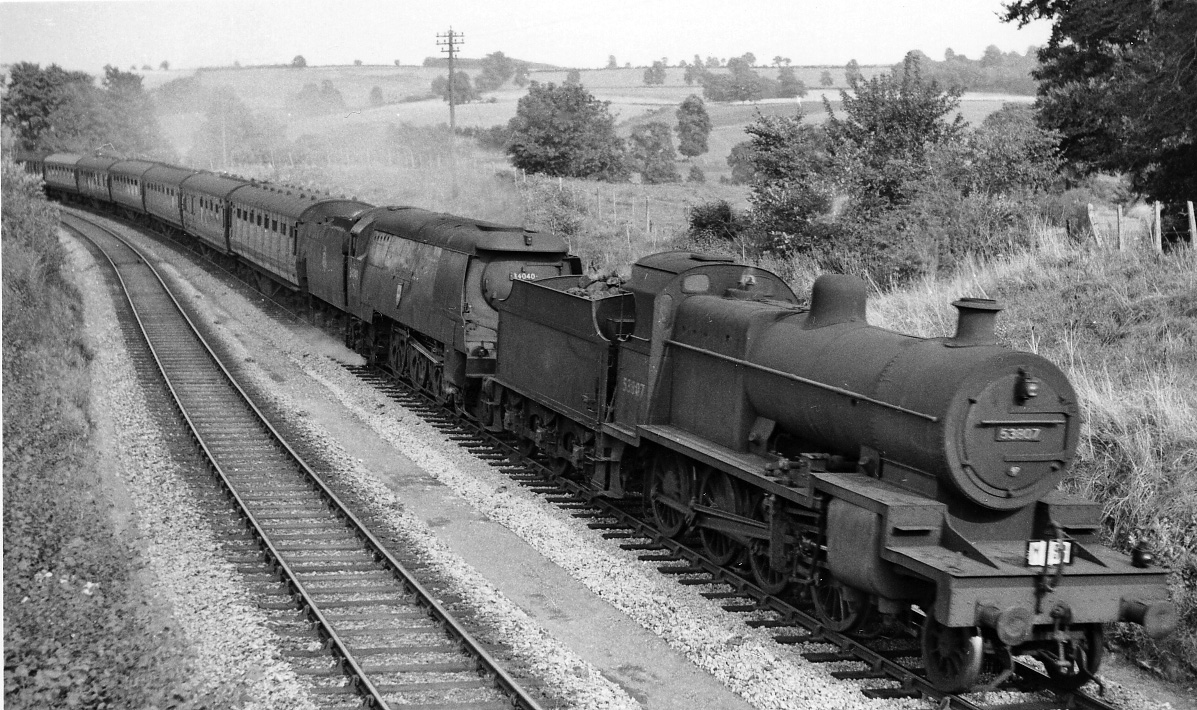
Pines Express relief in 1959 hauled by a 7F 2-8-0 and a West Country 4-6-2

The Pines Express was a named passenger train that ran daily between Manchester and Bournemouth in England between 1910 and 1967.

It ran for the first time under the name Pines Express on 26 September 1927; and is believed to have been named after the pine trees growing in the Chines in the Bournemouth area. When the service first ran, unnamed, on 1 October 1910, it was run jointly by the Midland Railway and LNWR; and was introduced in response to a LSWR/GWR service between Birkenhead and Bournemouth.

InterCity (British Rail) revived the Pines Express name for several years as part of the CrossCountry network.

== Route ==
The two termini used were nominally Manchester Piccadilly (then 'London Road') and Bournemouth West stations. However, for many years before the demise of the service, the northbound Pines terminated at the adjoining Mayfield station. This practice probably arose because the arrival time coincided with the evening rush hour when the London Road platforms were fully occupied. During the late 1950s this was the sole use of Mayfield station for passenger services.

=== Somerset and Dorset Joint Railway ===
The Pines Express became known as the top express to use the Somerset and Dorset Joint Railway (S&DJR); a steeply-graded railway line through photogenic hilly countryside between Bath Green Park and Bournemouth West station, much loved and sorely missed by enthusiasts. On this line, trains often had to be double-headed due to gradients, producing spectacular photographs and film footage. Ivo Peters, in particular, took many amateur photographs and cine films of the S&DJR.

=== Diversion of the service ===
The last Pines Express to run over the S&DJR was on 8 September 1962, hauled by 9F 92220 Evening Star. Subsequent services ran via Oxford, Reading, Basingstoke and Southampton, on the line originally built by the GWR.

In 1964 a Pines Express was the last passenger service that used the Didcot, Newbury and Southampton Railway before the line closed to all traffic by 1967.

From 4 October 1965 it was extended to Poole, but the last train was run on 4 March 1967.

=== Revival of the Pines Express name ===
InterCity (British Rail) revived many of the named trains running on what would now be called CrossCountry, although these were rerouted and timed to fit into the standard hourly service pattern through Birmingham New Street. Specifically, the 1990s Pines Express consisted of a pair of services from Bournemouth to Manchester and return, via Reading and Coventry. All named CrossCountry trains finally lost their names as part of Virgin CrossCountry's Operation Princess in 2002.
