= Bristol St Philip's railway station =

Disused railway station in England

Coordinates: 51.45455°N 2.57851°W

Bristol St Philip's
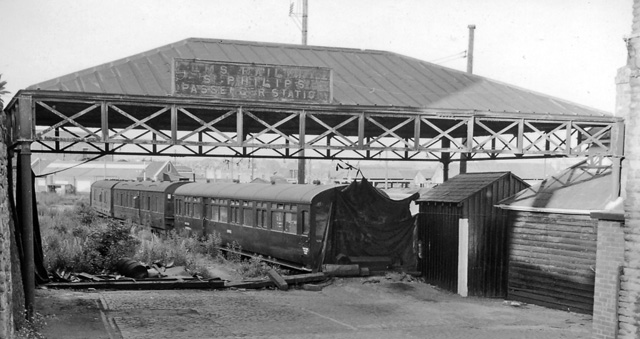
- The station in 1962, after closure to passengers

General information
- Location: Bristol; England
- Grid reference: ST599730
- Platforms: 1

Other information
- Status: Demolished

History
- Pre-grouping: Midland Railway
- Post-grouping: London, Midland and Scottish Railway

Key dates
- 6 August 1835: Opened to goods
- 2 May 1870: Opened to passengers
- 21 September 1953: Closed to passengers
- 1 April 1967: Closed to freight
Location

St Philip's railway station was the Midland Railway's small terminus in Bristol. The passenger station was opened in 1870 to relieve pressure on the city's main station at Bristol Temple Meads.

== History ==
The first railway at St Philip's was the Bristol and Gloucestershire Railway in 1835, a tramway that brought coal down to a wharf on the upper reaches of Bristol Harbour. A short branch left the main route near the harbour to a coal depot at St Philip's. The tramway was rebuilt as the Bristol and Gloucester Railway in 1844. This retained the original routes for goods traffic but took its passenger trains into the Great Western Railway's (GWR) terminus at Temple Meads on the other side of the harbour.

The Midland Railway bought the Bristol and Gloucester Railway in 1846. It continued to share the GWR terminus but in 1858 moved all its goods traffic to the yard in St Philip's and erected a large goods shed on the site in 1866. The Midland Railway opened a branch from Mangotsfield to Bath in 1869 which increased the number of trains that the GWR's terminus needed to handle. The local trains were diverted into a new station adjacent to the goods yard in St Philip's from 2 May 1870.

The station was sited close to the shops on Old Market and attracted commuter traffic for the city centre. The area was badly bombed during World War II, and Bristol's shopping district was rebuilt closer to the city centre.

The passenger trains were rerouted into Temple Meads and the passenger station closed on 21 September 1953. Goods traffic continued until the goods station closed on 1 April 1967. The site was later redeveloped for light industrial units.

== Description ==
The passenger station had a single platform with an entrance from Midland Road. There was a wooden building with a .ridge and furrow' canopy protecting the platform.

The goods yard had 20 sidings. The goods shed was 180 by 133 feet (55 m × 41 m) and included a cellar that could store 15,000 hogsheads of beer to accommodate traffic from the breweries in Burton-on-Trent. The main shed had 15 hydraulic cranes which were later supplemented by additional electric cranes. There was stabling for 50 horses.

== Services ==
St Philip's was used principally by the local services between Bristol and Bath Green Park. Long distance services ran from Bristol Temple Meads. There were 13 trains on weekdays in the 1950s.

Preceding station	Disused railways	Following station
Terminus	Bristol and Gloucester Railway (Midland Railway)	Fishponds
