= Page Park, Staple Hill =

Park in South Gloucestershire, England

Coordinates: 51.482°N 2.498°W

Location of Page Park in Gloucestershire

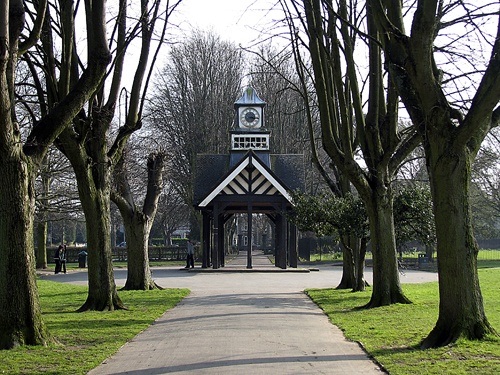
View of the clock tower

Page Park is a park in the Staple Hill area of South Gloucestershire.

In 1910, the park was donated to the people of Staple Hill by Arthur William Page, the same year he was elected Alderman of the county of Gloucestershire.

The land on which the park was formed was originally part of the Hill House estate. The road to the east of the park is named Hill House Road. Nineteen acres of land from the estate were set aside for the park. An official opening took place on 14 December 1910. The National Anthem was sung whilst an oak sapling was planted.

In the centre of the park stands an impressive pavilion, known locally as the clock tower because of the four-faced clock upon its roof. The clock tower remains to this day and gives its image as the symbol of the park.

The park contains other features:

- a drinking fountain donated in 1912
- seating
- public toilets
- a band stand donated in 1927, restored in 2013
- tennis courts donated in 1929
- a tennis pavilion in 1930
- bowling green in 1948

The park has a selection of sports fields, accommodating football and cricket teams. It was the start and finish place for the Kingswood Festival marathon in 1985.

The park underwent a transformation to become the green heart of Staple Hill around 2015. With help from South Gloucestershire Council, the Big Lottery Fund, and the Heritage Lottery Fund. The creation of a new cafe and community spaces are amongst the improvements.

The park is the venue for the Big Lunch; a community event designed to bring together the people of Staple Hill with music, children's rides and family entertainment.

== Friends of Page Park ==
The Friends of Page Park are a non-profit making, voluntary group of local residents and park users whose aim is to protect and improve the park and its facilities for the community and future generations. The group is a registered charity. The friends have worked on a number of projects to help fundraiser for the park and to implement improvements and events for the benefit of the local community.

The Friends charity website is http://www.friendsofpagepark.co.uk/home.html
