= Mangotsfield =

Village in Gloucestershire, England

Coordinates: 51.48°N 2.49°W

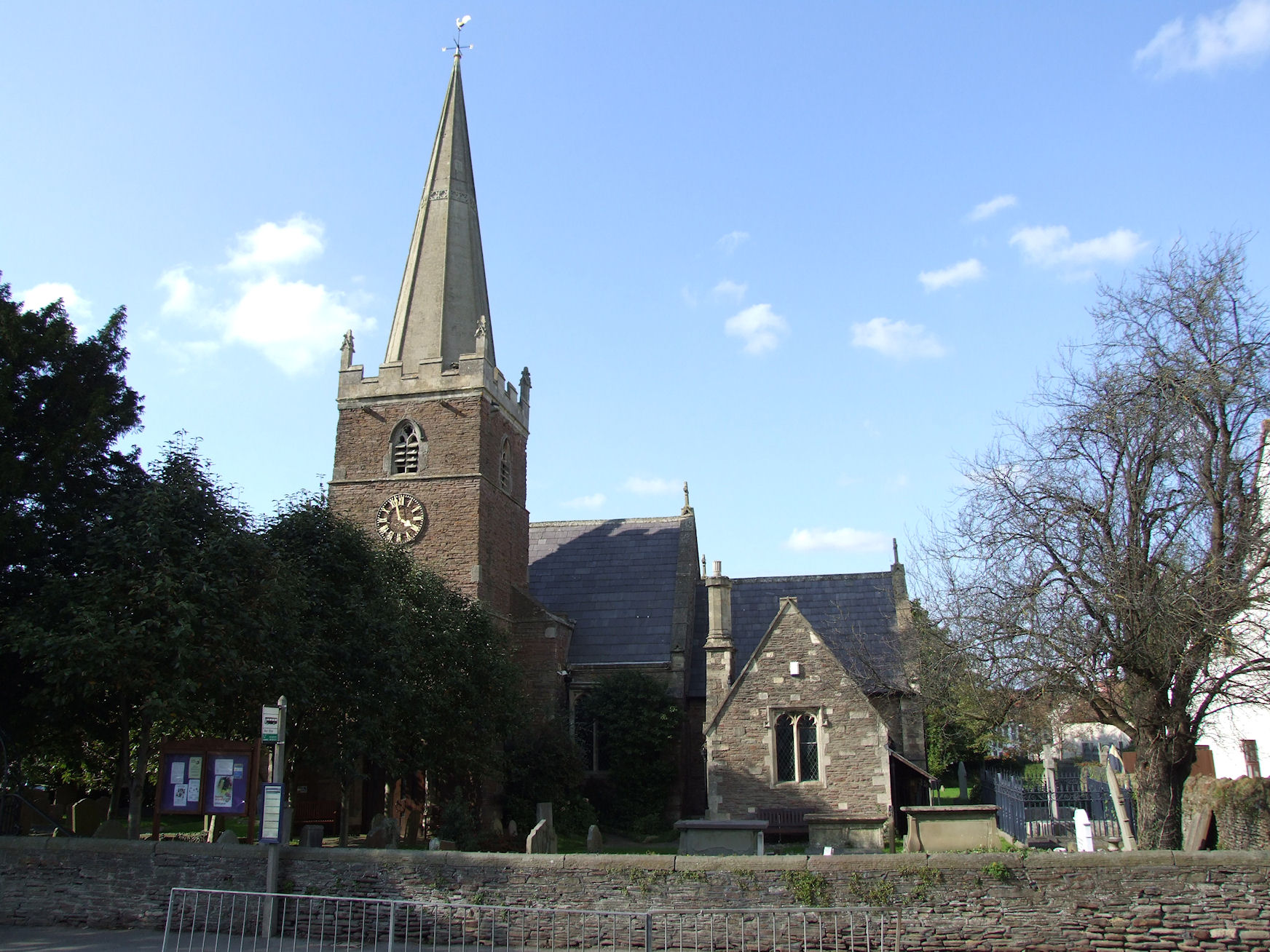

- Location within Gloucestershire
- OS grid reference: ST661764
- Civil parish: Staple Hill and Mangotsfield
- Unitary authority: South Gloucestershire
- Ceremonial county: Gloucestershire
- Region: South West
- Country: England
- Sovereign state: United Kingdom
- Post town: BRISTOL
- Postcode district: BS16
- Dialling code: 0117
- Police: Avon and Somerset
- Fire: Avon
- Ambulance: South Western
- UK Parliament: Bristol North East

Mangotsfield is a village and former civil parish in the unitary authority area of South Gloucestershire, in the ceremonial county of Gloucestershire, England, to the north-east of Bristol.

The village was mentioned in the Domesday Book in 1086 as Manegodesfelle, and as Manegodesfeld in 1377.

Between 1845 and 1966 the village was served by Mangotsfield railway station.

== Parish ==
Until the 19th century Mangotsfield was the principal settlement in a large ancient parish, which also included the hamlets of Downend and Staple Hill to the west of the village, and Emersons Green, Vinny Green, Blackhorse and Moorend to the north. The parish became the civil parish of Mangotsfield in 1866.

In the early 20th century Downend and Staple Hill were developed into suburbs of Bristol and outgrew the village of Mangotsfield. In 1921 the parish had a population of 10,720. In 1927 the civil parish was abolished and divided into two. Downend, Staple Hill and Mangotsfield village became Mangotsfield Urban District (and the civil parish of Mangotsfield Urban), and the rural eastern parts of the parish became the new civil parish of Mangotsfield Rural. Mangotsfield Urban District was itself abolished in 1974 and became part of Kingswood Borough in the new county of Avon. When Avon was abolished in 1996 the whole of Kingswood Borough joined South Gloucestershire. The civil parish of Mangotsfield Rural continued until 2015, when it was renamed Emersons Green.

== Church ==
The parish church of St James dates from the 13th century, but was rebuilt and altered in the 19th century. It is a Grade II* listed building.

== Sport and leisure ==
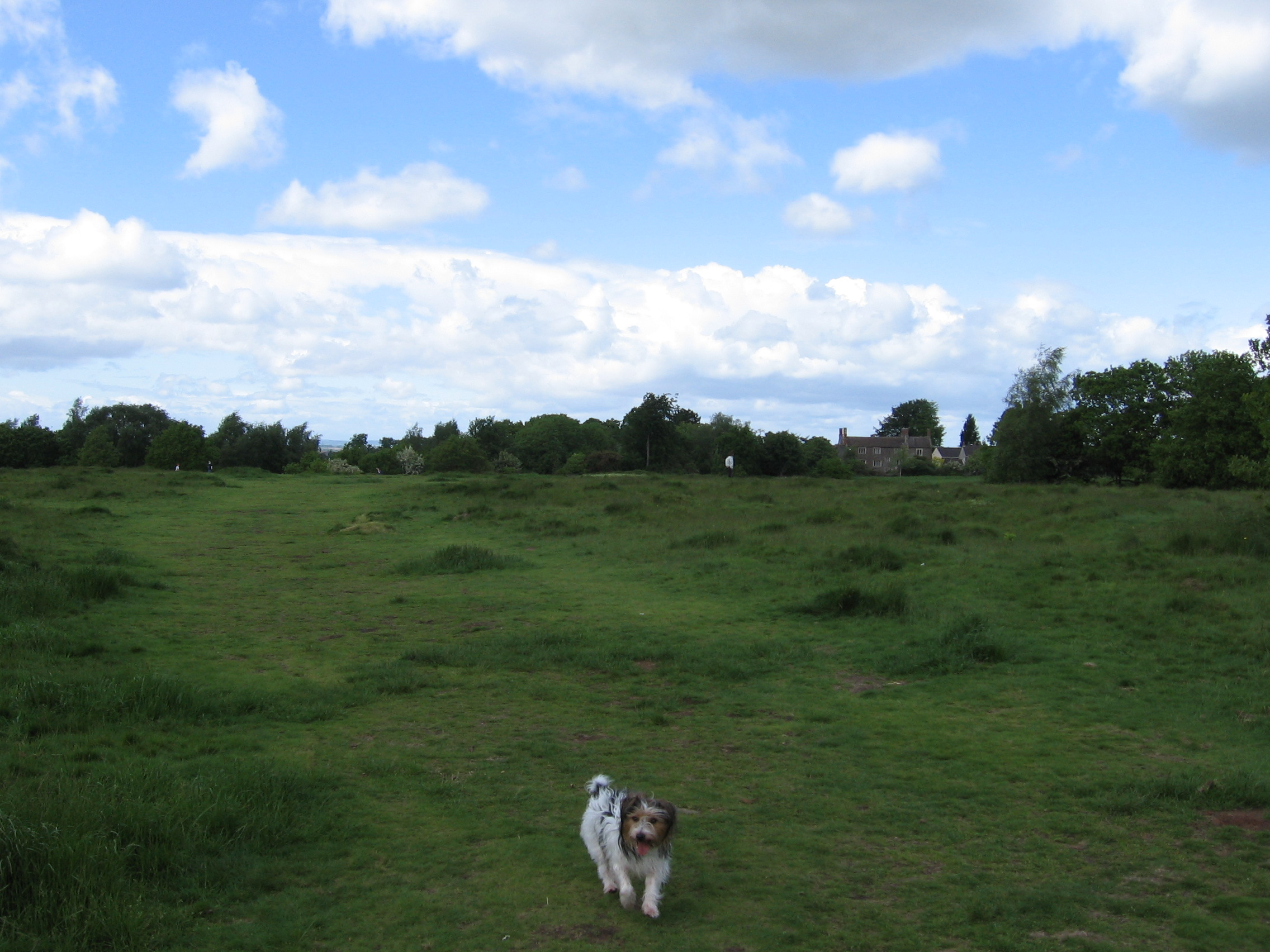
Rodway Hill, Mangotsfield.

Mangotsfield is the home of Mangotsfield United F.C. and Cleve R.F.C. Rodway Hill is a favourite spot for dog walkers and the starting point of many pigeon races.

== Education and schools ==
There is one secondary school in Mangotsfield: Mangotsfield School (a Specialist College in Engineering and Science). There is also a primary school in the area, Mangotsfield C of E Primary School, however this is sited in the sister village of Emerson’s Green next door.
