= Bath Green Park railway station =

Former railway station in England

Bath Green Park
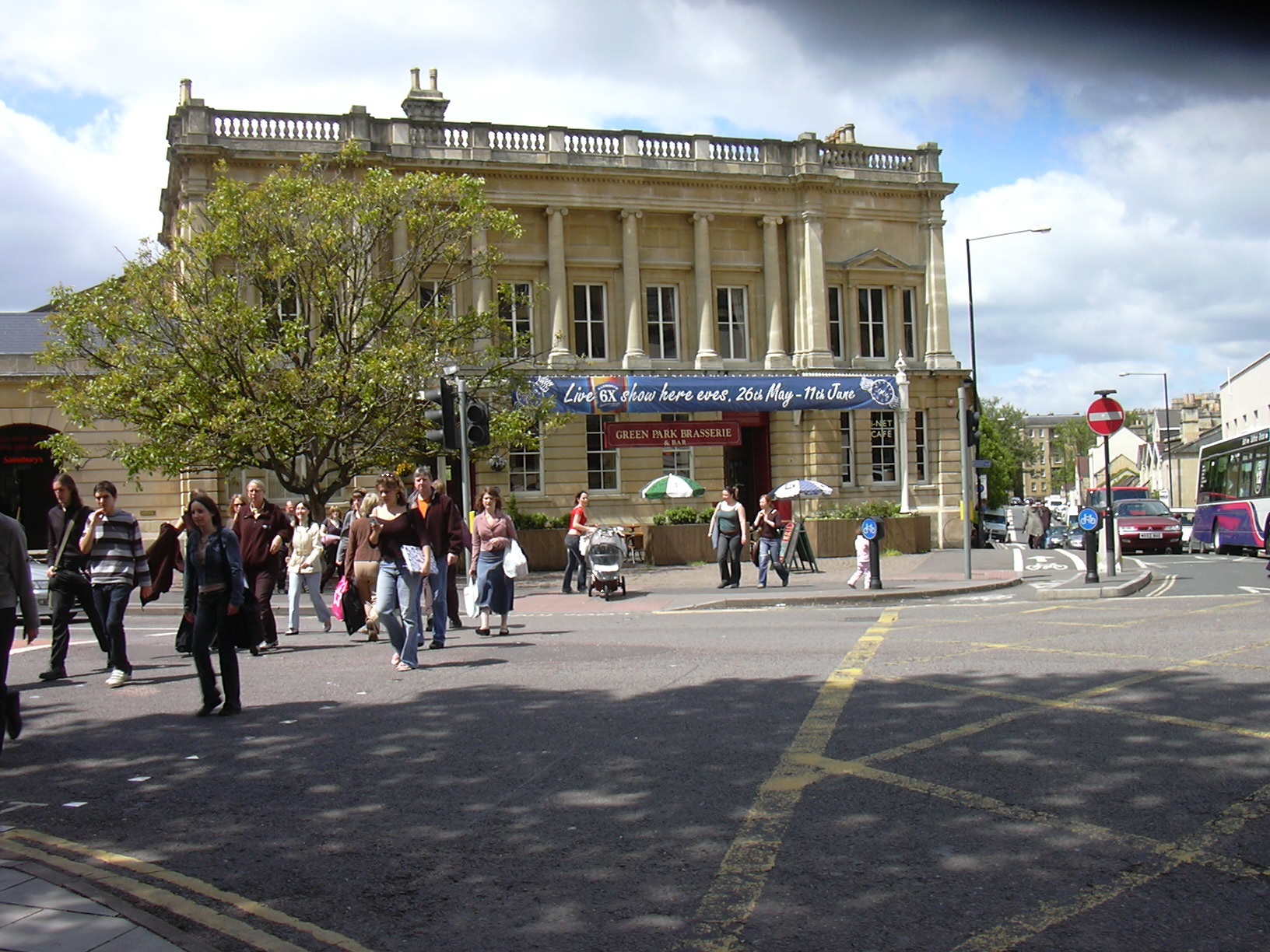
- Bath Green Park station from James Street West

General information
- Location: Bath, Bath and North East Somerset; England
- Coordinates: 51.3815°N 2.367°W
- Grid reference: ST745647
- Platforms: 2

Other information
- Status: Disused

History
- Original company: Midland Railway
- Pre-grouping: Midland Railway
- Post-grouping: London, Midland and Scottish Railway

Key dates
- 7 May 1870: Station opened as Bath
- 18 June 1951: Renamed Bath Green Park
- 7 March 1966: Station closed
Location

Green Park railway station is a former railway station in Bath, Somerset, England. It was unofficially known as Bath Queen Square until 1951 when it was given the name Bath Green Park.

== Architecture and opening ==
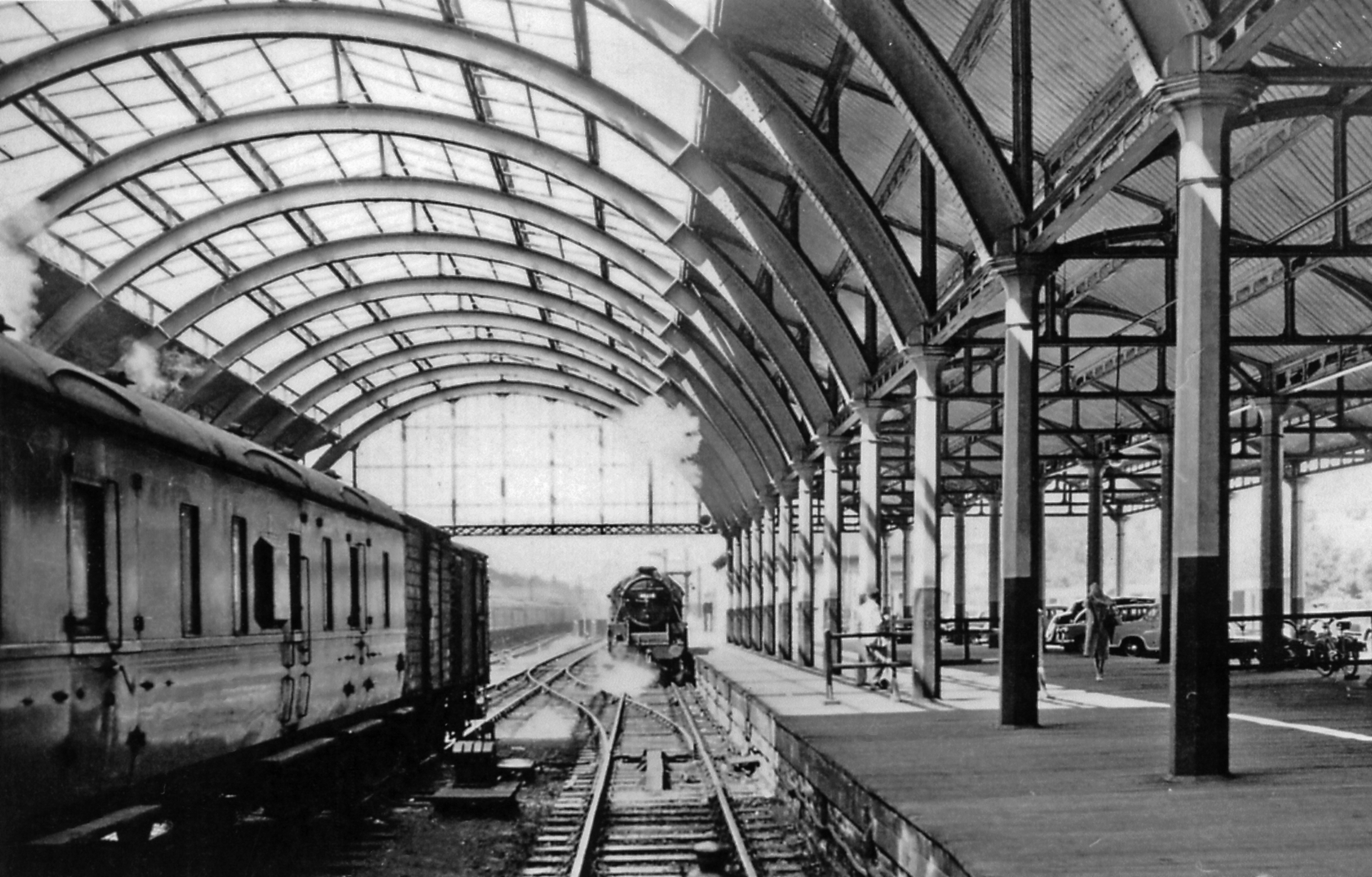
Bath Green Park railway station in 1962

Green Park station was opened on 7 May 1870 as the terminus of Midland Railway's Mangotsfield and Bath Branch Line The bridge over the River Avon was not ready when the railway was opened on 5 August 1869 so a temporary terminus was provided on the west bank of the river.

The station buildings were designed by the Midland Railway architect John Holloway Sanders. It was built in an elegant style which blends well with the Georgian buildings around it and includes a vaulted glass roof in a single-span wrought iron arch structure. The platform accommodation in the station was modest, having an arrival platform and a departure platform, with two sidings between them. The siding adjacent to the arrival platform was equipped with ground frame points to release an arriving train engine.

The station is on the north bank of the River Avon. The locomotive shed was about half a mile from the station to the north side of the main tracks. The goods yard was on the opposite side of the tracks from this. Access to the goods yard from central Bath was via the newly constructed Midland Bridge.

== The Avon Bridge ==
Immediately outside the station, trains crossed a bridge over the river Avon.

There was a second no longer existent bridge which connected the Midland Railway to the now demolished Bath Gas Company's works manufactured by Stothert & Pitt of Bath.

== The Somerset & Dorset Railway ==
When the Somerset and Dorset Railway completed its Bath extension line on 20 July 1874, they connected into the Midland line at Bath Junction a half mile outside the station, and used the station. This created considerable additional through traffic, and as well as heavy volumes of freight, through passenger journeys from the Midlands to the South Coast were created. Through trains had to reverse at Bath, and the most famous of these was the named Pines Express from Manchester (and at times other northern originating points) to Bournemouth West.

=== Motive power depots ===
Both the Midland Railway and the Somerset and Dorset Joint Railway opened locomotive depots near the station on the west side of the river Avon. The Midland Depot opened in 1869 and the SDJR in 1874. Both closed in March 1966.

== Subsequent history ==
It was operated by the Midland Railway. At the grouping it passed to the London, Midland and Scottish Railway. For almost all of its life, it was usually referred to as Bath Queen Square station, after the prestigious square about a quarter of a mile away. It was Bath Green Park by British Railways from18 June 1951.

Parts of the distinctive glass roof were damaged during bombing raids in April 1942, and the glazing was not re-instated during railway usage after the war.

Ordinary services were local Midland trains to Bristol St Philips and Clifton Down, later to Bristol Temple Meads, and S&D trains to Templecombe and beyond.

== Closure ==
Following the Beeching Report, passenger trains ceased from 7 March 1966 and goods train from 31 May 1971.

== Current uses ==
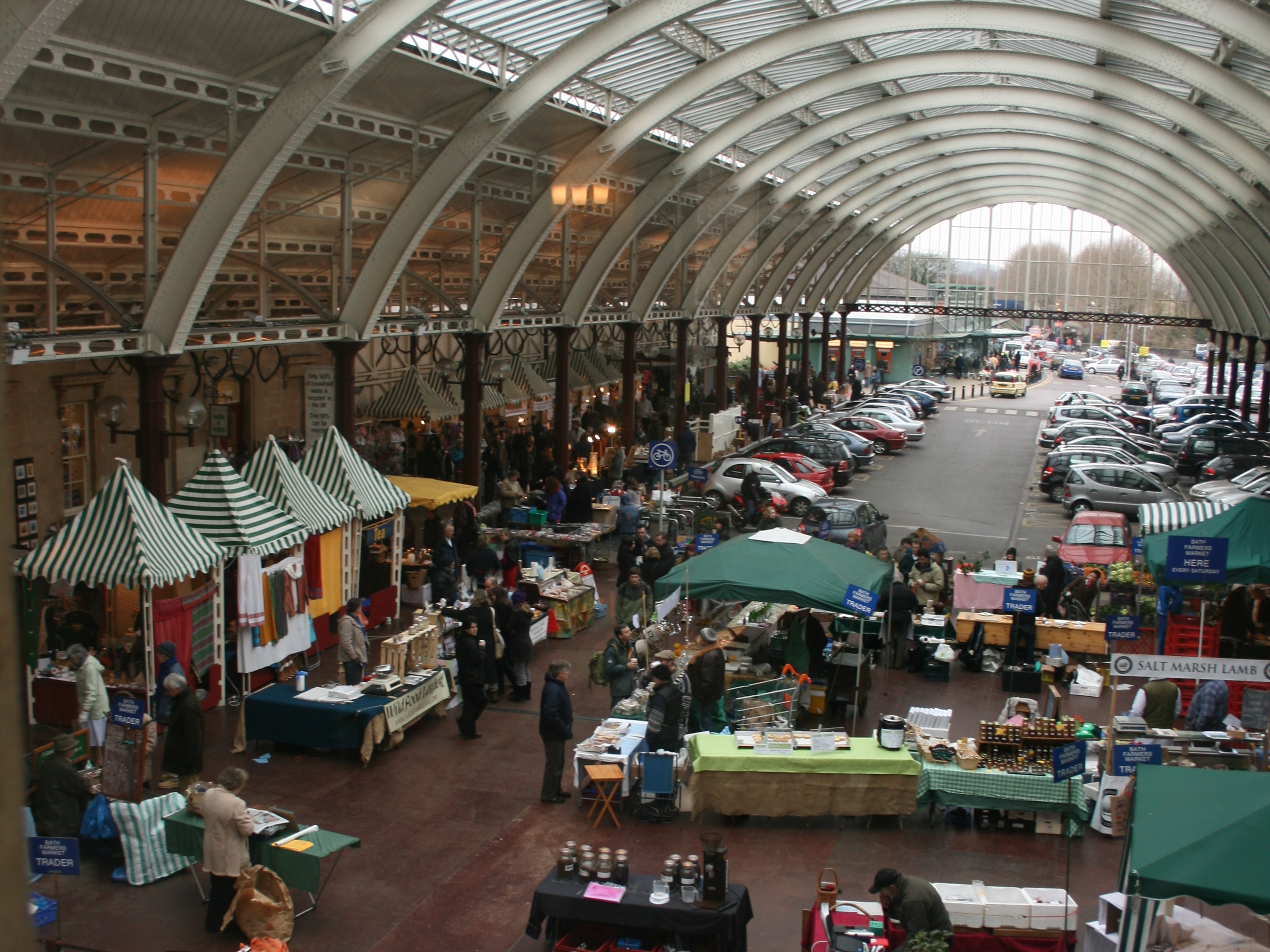
Saturday markets at Green Park Station

In the 1980s the rail approaches to the station were redeveloped as a Sainsbury's supermarket which opened on 1 December 1982. The station itself is used as a pedestrian route between the city and the supermarket. There are small shops in the former station buildings and the platform area is used for events.

The station is a Grade II listed building, Green Park Station has become an active retail and events space.

Run for many years by Envolve Partnership, a local sustainability enterprise, The Ethical Property Company took over management in November 2008, and now manage all activity on the site, beyond the car park and the Sainsbury's supermarket. The former booking hall is now Green Park Brasserie.

The old station concourses are used as a covered market and events space, with a farmers' market, and other regular Saturday traders operating in the market square. Local events and performances are scheduled throughout the year as well, and have included performances for the Bath Fringe Festival. Green Park Station also includes office space in the converted vaults of the station's lower floor, now the base to several local charities and social businesses.

Since the early months of 2021, significant parts of the station have been cordoned off to allow restorative works to take place on the roof. During and before these works took place, large glass panels came loose from the main structure, falling to the floor below. These repairs are scheduled to finish for summer 2022.

In April 2023, the station was damaged by a fire. It started in one of the wooden sheds housing local businesses, and spread to the roof.

== Services ==
Preceding station	Disused railways	Following station
Weston (Bath); Line and station closed	Midland Railway; Mangotsfield and Bath Branch Line	Terminus
Midford; Line and station closed	Somerset and Dorset Joint Railway; LSWR and Midland Railways	Terminus

== See also ==
- List of lattice truss bridges in the United Kingdom
