= Mangotsfield and Bath branch line =

Railway line in south-west England

The Mangotsfield and Bath branch line was a railway line opened by the Midland Railway Company in 1869 to connect Bath to its network at Mangotsfield, on its line between Bristol and Birmingham. It was usually referred to as "the Bath branch" of the Midland Railway.

The line never achieved great importance, but for many years it carried heavy summer holiday traffic from Midlands cities to Bournemouth over the Somerset and Dorset line, which connected to it at Bath. In the 1960s these trains, and the daily "Pines Express", became famous among railway enthusiasts, as did the station at Bath, by then named "Green Park".

The line closed in 1966 except for a minimal coal delivery to Bath which continued until 1971.

Much of the route now forms the Bristol and Bath Railway Path, and the Avon Valley Railway operates a heritage steam railway activity at Bitton.

== Beginnings ==
The Midland Railway, based in Derby, had operated a main line linking Bristol to Birmingham since 1845. (The section between Bristol and Gloucester had had complicated origins, starting as a simple mineral line serving the South Gloucestershire coalfield, and becoming the Bristol and Gloucester Railway, absorbed by the Midland company in 1845.). Bath was a significant destination for visitors and as a city of considerable size, was a source of demand for inwards manufactured goods from the Midlands, and a route to Bath would also capture some of the colliery traffic.

In July 1864 the Midland Railway obtained parliamentary authority in the Midland Railway (Bath and Thornbury Lines) Act 1864 (27 & 28 Vict. c. clxiv) to construct a branch line to Bath, and the line was duly opened on 4 August 1869. At first the Bath station was a temporary building west of the River Avon, but in 1870 the extension was opened to the splendid terminus at Queen Square in the city; the Great Western Railway had opened its main line between London and Bristol in 1840, and had its own Bath station on the other side of the city.

The branch connected with the Bristol to Gloucester line at Mangotsfield by a triangular junction allowing through running direct from the north towards Bath.

== The route ==
Mangotsfield is approximately seven miles (11 km) North East of Bristol. The Bristol to Gloucester line ran north-easterly, with a Mangotsfield station on the Shortwood Road. The Bath line formed a junction about 1 mile (1.6 km) closer to Bristol, and facing Bristol; a new Mangotsfield station was opened when the Bath branch opened, replacing the earlier station. The station was very extensive with four wide platforms and large canopies, to cater for considerable passenger interchange volumes.

From Mangotsfield the line descended with a ruling gradient of 1 in 121 (8.3 ‰), east and then south-eastwards with stations at Warmley, Oldland Common and Bitton; all of those settlements were in those days remote from the suburban areas of Bristol. From Bitton the line followed the valley of the River Avon south-easterly into Bath on flatter gradients, but the Great Western Railway main line already occupied the easiest route, and the new Midland alignment ran further north, crossing the River Avon six times. Although the line skirted the northern margin of the town of Saltford, there was no station there, but there was one at Kelston, across the river. Some tickets were printed "Kelston for Saltford"; there was a ferry there. Next station was Weston, then Bath. The goods yard and engine shed at Bath were west of the final river crossing, and the station was east of it.

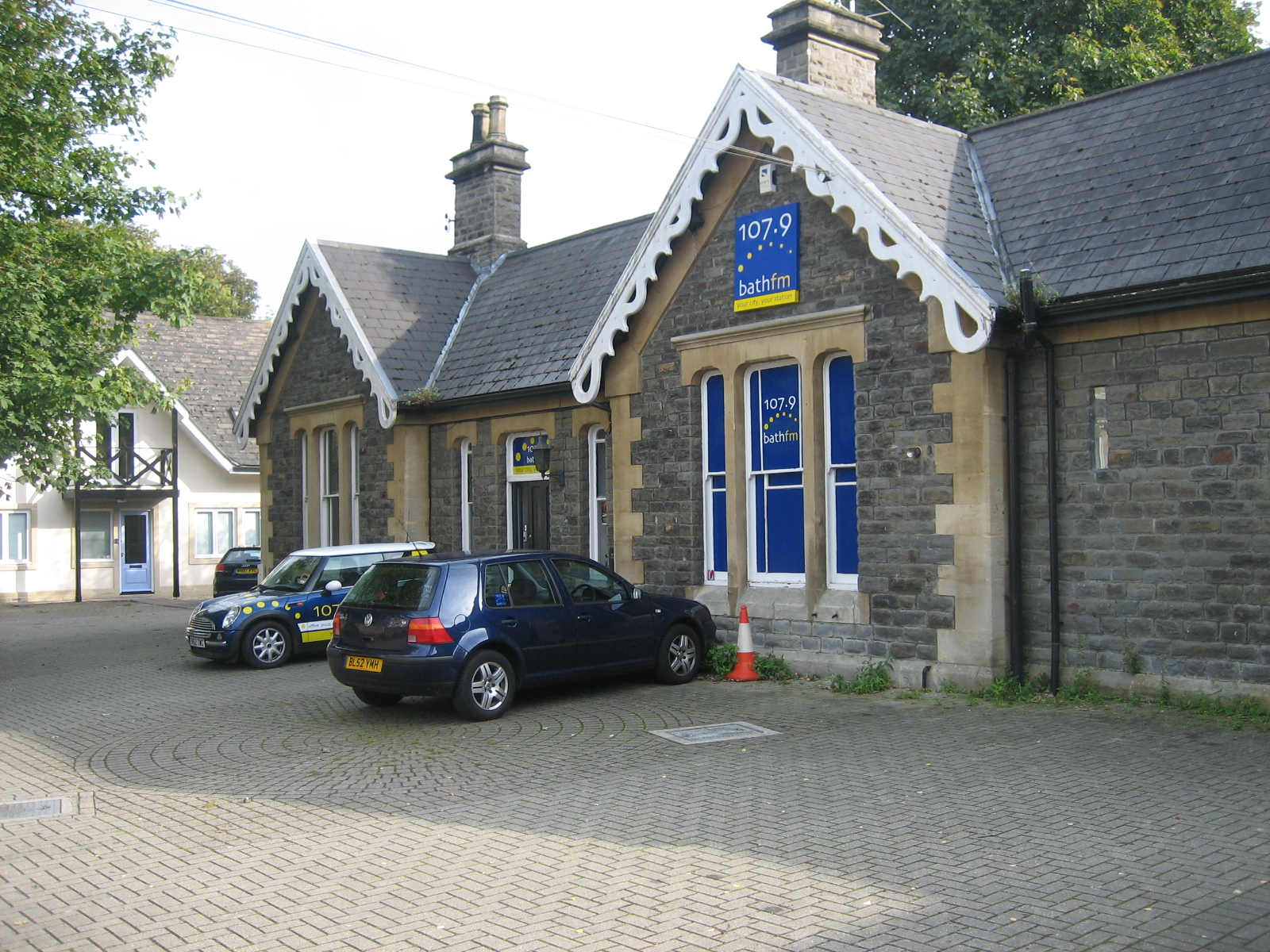
Weston station, September 2007

The line was double track from the start; the station at Bath had a large all-over roof, covering two platforms in the then-traditional format of a departure platform and an arrival platform, with two carriage sidings between them. (In later years the platforms were used for both arrivals and departures, and one of the carriage sidings was altered to become an engine-release road.) The station at Bath was called simply "Bath" although timetables sometimes indicated "Queen Square -- about 1 mile to G.W. station". It seems that the description Queen Square was never formally used by the railway. After nationalisation of the railways in 1948, it was no longer appropriate to refer to "Midland station" and the title Bath Green Park was applied from 18 June 1951.

An east chord line, forming a triangle, was made at Mangotsfield, enabling trains to run direct between Bath and Gloucester; this opened in 1873.

Weston station was renamed Weston (Bath) on 1 October 1934 because of confusion with Weston-super-Mare.

== Train services ==
The line had a service of nine passenger trains daily at first, all to Bristol (St Philips). On the opening of the connection to the Avonmouth line, some trains ran there from Bath.

In 1895 there were 14 departures from Bath, of which most ran to Bristol St Philips. Several connections at Mangotsfield to Avonmouth are shown; it is impossible to tell from Bradshaw whether these were through carriages.

== The Somerset and Dorset line arrives ==
Two local railways, the Somerset Central Railway (opened 1854) and the Dorset Central Railway (opened 1860) had been built as purely coal concerns; they had combined in 1862 as the Somerset and Dorset Railway, forming a route from the English Channel at Poole to the Bristol Channel at Burnham-on-Sea. They soon directed their ambitions to a more northerly connection, and extended their line to Bath, joining the Midland Railway's Bath branch just outside the Bath station. This line opened on 20 July 1874; allying itself with the Midland company, the Somerset & Dorset Railway used the Bath passenger station and goods facilities.

However the S&D company's financial resources were exhausted and they were forced to lease their line to a wealthier sponsor, and in August 1875, they leased their line for 999 years jointly to the Midland Railway and the London and South Western Railway (to which they connected further south). Operated jointly by the lessees, the line became known as the Somerset & Dorset Joint Railway.

In consequence the Bath station became much busier, and through trains were operated, reversing at Bath, between Bristol and destinations on the S&D line.

== Later years ==
In the second half of the twentieth century, the line settled down to providing a basic stopping train service between Bath and Bristol; the St Philips station at Bristol was usually used until its closure in 1953, when the trains transferred to Temple Meads, generally using the original Brunel terminus there. Many of the trains formed through services to and from Templecombe or Bournemouth. The star service was the Pines Express, a through train between Manchester and Bournemouth, and on Friday nights and Saturdays in the summer, a huge volume of trains from Midlands and Yorkshire places to the south coast resorts. There was also a nightly mail and parcels train between Bath and the Midlands.

Considered as effectively an extension of the Somerset and Dorset line, the branch suffered from poor loadings and high operating costs and the report "The Reshaping of British Railways", sometimes referred to as the Beeching Axe, cited the line for closure; this duly took place for passengers on 7 March 1966. Coal workings to Bath gas works continued over the line, which was reduced to a single line, until 1971.

== After closure ==
The route of the former railway has remained largely intact, although the former rural villages have become absorbed into a developing conurbation incorporating Bath and Bristol.

A footpath and cycleway was formed over much of the route (and continuing into Bristol); it is described at Bristol and Bath Railway Path. A roundabout and part of the carriageway of the A4174 road occupy the alignment near Siston and northwards.

After closure of the Bristol–Yate line in 1970 (trains were diverted via Filton between Bristol and Yate) the Bristol Suburban Railway Society was formed, announcing plans to operate a commuter service over the lines independently, but this failed to attract the necessary resources. Instead, much of the route was converted to use as a footpath and cycle route; this has become the Bristol and Bath Railway Path.

However a railway preservation group, the Avon Valley Railway, based at Bitton, is operating heritage steam trains over part of the route.

At Bath, the passenger station remains intact, and is in use as a retail and exhibition space; a major supermarket (Sainsbury's) and its car park occupy the railway lands immediately to the west of the river bridge.
