= Kelston (disambiguation) =

Kelston is a village in the United Kingdom. It may also refer to:

- Relating to the UK village:

- Kelston Lock, a lock on the River Avon
- Kelston railway station, a former railway station
- Kelston Park, a listed house and its gardens

- Kelston, New Zealand, a suburb of Auckland

- Kelston Boys' High School, a school in the Auckland suburb
- Kelston Girls' College, a school in the Auckland suburb
- Kelston Deaf Education Centre, a residential special school in the Auckland suburb
- Kelston (New Zealand electorate), a parliamentary electorate

- Lucy Kelston (born 1922), American operatic soprano
