= Kelston toll road =

Former toll road in Somerset, England

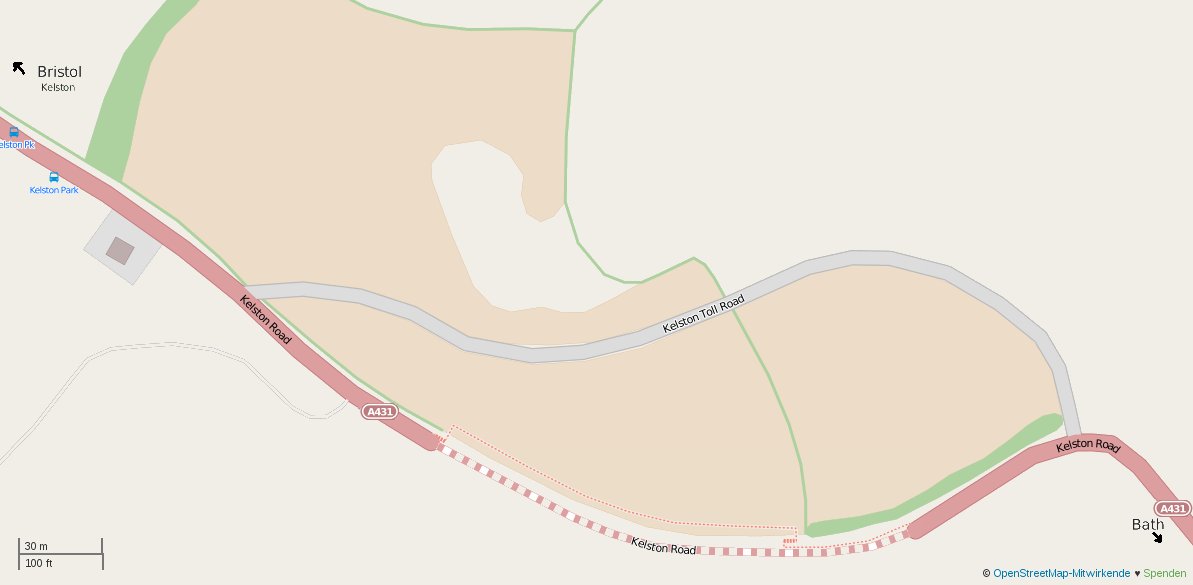
- A map of the road on OpenStreetMap in November 2014

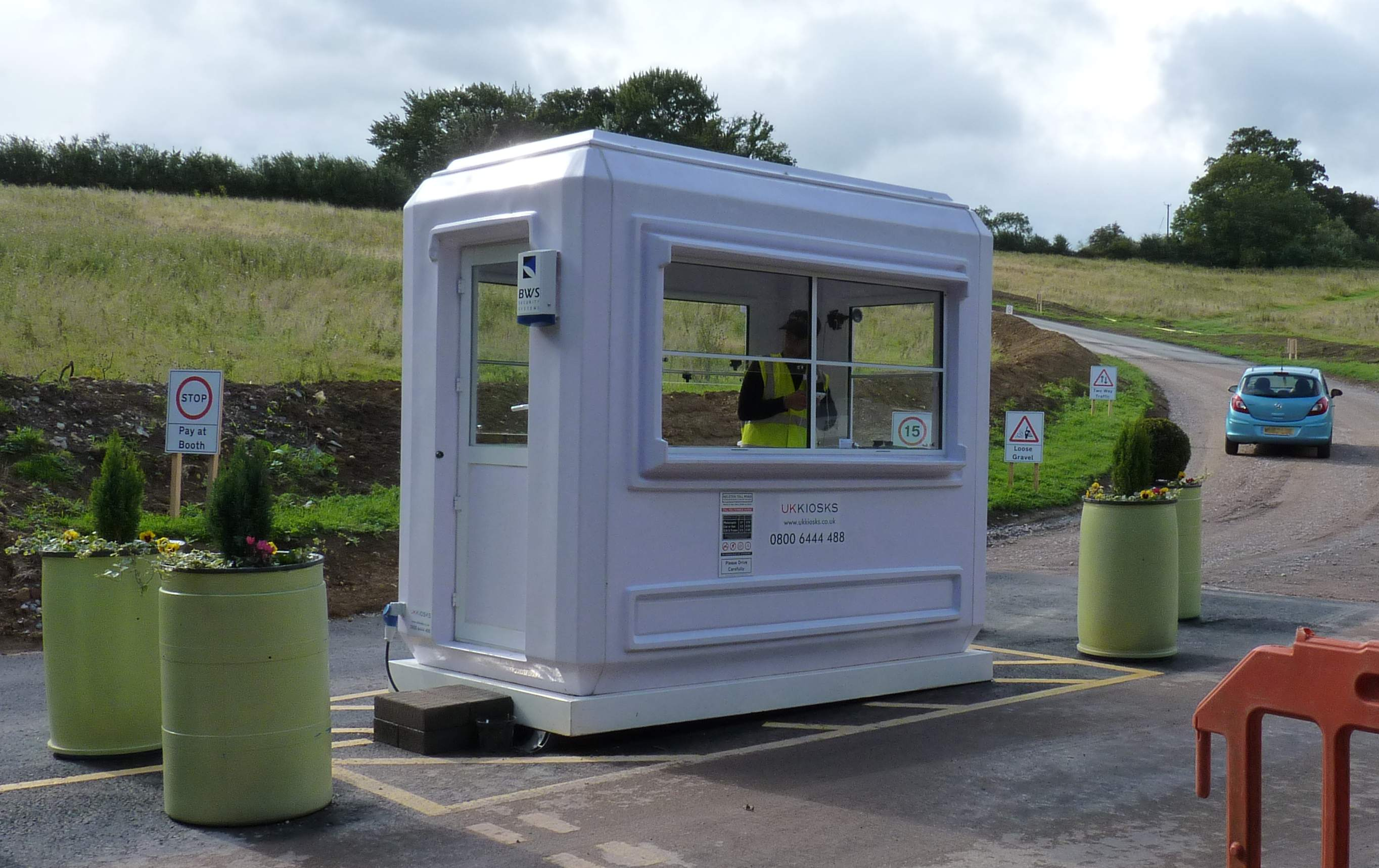
- The toll booth at the eastern end of the road

Route information
- Length: 0.365 km (0.227 mi; 1,200 ft)
- Existed: 1 August 2014–17 November 2014

Major junctions
- East end: 51°23′45″N 2°25′03″W
- West end: 51°23′47″N 2°25′20″W

Location
- Country: United Kingdom
- Constituent country: England
- Counties: Somerset

Road network
- Roads in the United Kingdom; Motorways; A and B road zones

The Kelston toll road was an unofficial temporary toll road in the village of Kelston, Somerset, England. The road was 1,198 feet (365 m) in length; it ran across a field adjacent to a closed section of the A431 road, circumventing the council's suggested detour of 14 miles (23 km). The road was built as an unofficial toll road without planning permission, which the council later forced the operator to apply for retroactively.

The A431 was closed through Kelston due to fears of a landslip on 17 February 2014, and the council said it would not build a temporary road to replace it. Due to the impact of the closure on local businesses and journey times, local entrepreneur Mike Watts and his partner Wendy Race decided to construct the toll road at a price of £150,000, meaning that 1,000 cars would have to use the road daily for them to break even on their costs. The toll cost £2 for cars.

The toll road opened on 1 August 2014; despite the public largely being in support of the toll, the council forced Watts to apply for retroactive planning permission, which was delayed until after the road closed. After 14 weeks of operation, the toll road closed on 17 November in conjunction with the reopening of the affected section of the A431; this was four weeks earlier than the council had originally promised. Because of this, Watts estimates that he had an overall shortfall of £10,000 despite the road having over 163,000 journeys. The road was returned to fields in February 2015.

== Background ==
The A431 is an A road which runs between the cities of Bristol and Bath in South West England. On 17 February 2014, cracks that had been found in the road near the village of Kelston led to fears of a catastrophic landslip. Bath and North East Somerset Council, the council responsible for the road through Kelston, reported that the ground underneath the road had slipped up to 7 m (23 ft), leading to fears around public safety. Because of this, the decision was made by the council to close the road. This closure severed the connection between Bath and many villages, including Kelston.

The council designed an official detour for drivers to be able to avoid the closure; it was reported by the media as both 10 miles (16 km) (Note: Multiple sources.) and 14 miles (23 km) (Note: Multiple sources.) in length. This discrepancy was due to the fact that the detour between Kelston and Bath was 10 miles (16 km), but the detour between one side of the closed road and the other was 14 miles (23 km), which took drivers one hour to travel.

In contrast to the closure, the toll road was only 1,198 feet (365 m) long when it opened, and took approximately 1 1/2 minutes to travel. The council said at the time that they would not be considering a temporary public road to replace the closed section. There were also suggestions that the army be used to help repair the road, but the council dismissed it as an impractical solution.

In March 2014, the council claimed that the road closure would last at least another six months, and that engineers were utilising CCTV, ground-penetrating radar technology, engineering experts and drilling rigs in order to find the cause of the damage to the road. The local council also asked utility companies to complete any necessary works while the road was closed, in order to prevent any future disruption to the road.

In June 2014, the council estimated that the closure would last until the end of the year at a cost of £1.5 million. The council also claimed that building a temporary road would take sixteen weeks and use the land needed to repair the damaged stretch of road. The council also claimed that the extended length of the closure was due to works only being able to begin in July; this was because the ground had only stopped moving in May, a prerequisite for any repairs to take place.

== Creation of the toll ==
The closure severely impacted local businesses due to the lost traffic through villages on the A431 route such as Kelston, as well as business owners' inability to travel into the village from nearby. One example of this was local retailer and entrepreneur Mike Watts, who was aged 62 at the time. He was living on the Bristol side of the landslip with his wife and business partner Wendy Race; the pair owned multiple businesses in Bath.

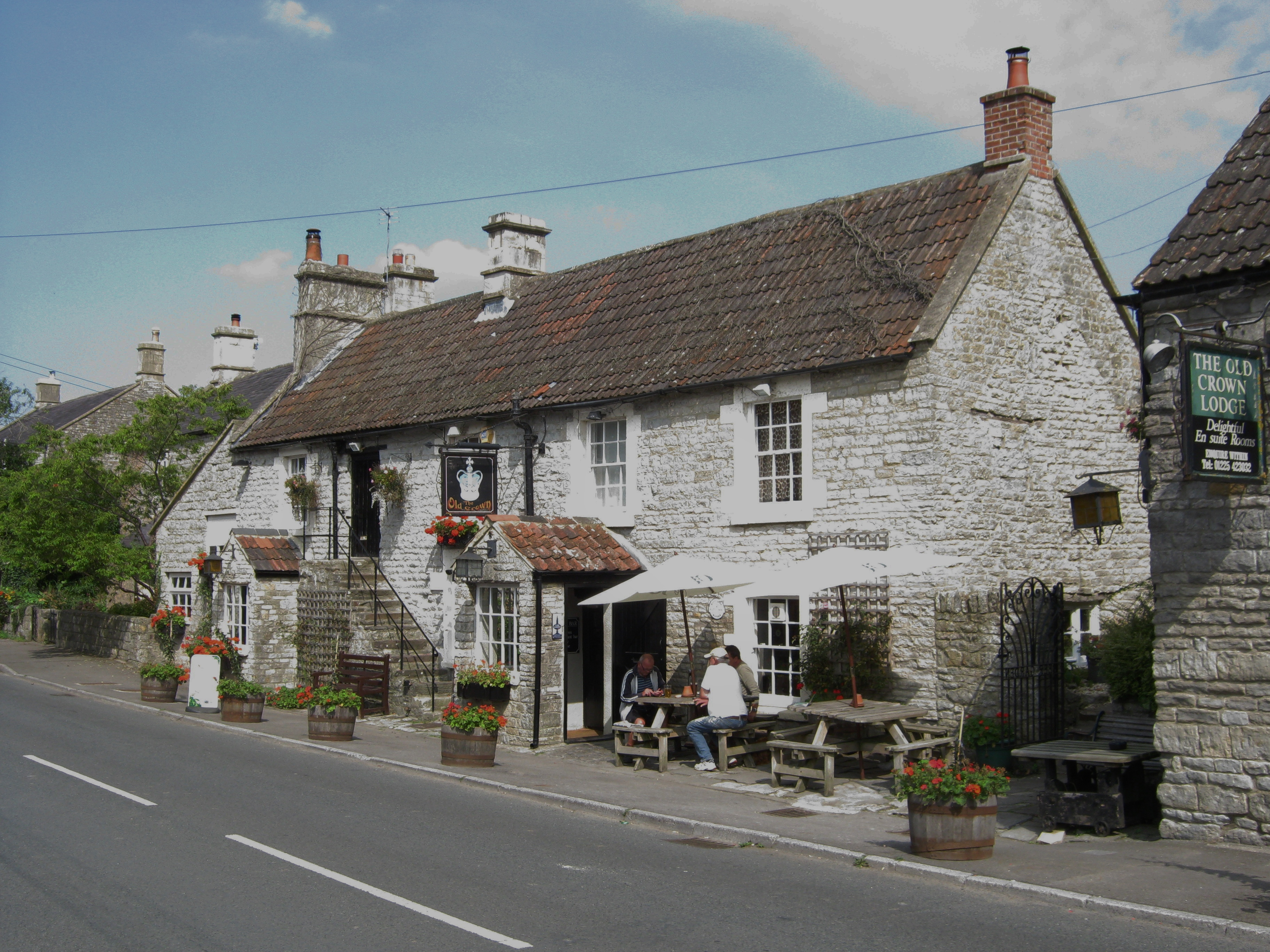
The Old Crown pub in Kelston, where the idea for the toll road was conceived.

In order to avoid the closed road, local four-wheel drive owners had resorted to driving off-road through an adjacent field; this became problematic after a tweet caused non-locals and drivers of two-wheel drive cars to attempt to do this. The owner of that field, John Dinham, told Watts and Race that drivers were doing this during a visit in May 2014 to The Old Crown, Kelston's local pub. Race suggested to Watts that they build a toll road over the field to circumvent the road closure as a community initiative. In order to get contractors to commit to building the road, the couple had to use their house as collateral. Kelston Toll Road Limited was officially incorporated on 27 May to act as the official operators of the road; Watts was its sole director.

=== Construction ===
The route of the road simply ran parallel to the closed road through an adjacent hilly field. Watts did not expect to make any profit, but he said that if he did it would be shared with John Dinham, the farmer whose land the road was built upon. The road was built unofficially as a private toll, and Watts did not apply for planning permission at the time. The road was built by the local firm R. M. Penny of Ston Easton; it took three men ten days to complete the work, which was delivered on-time and in-budget. The construction of the road cost £150,000 and a further £150,000 to operate.

In order to save money, Watts decided not to build the road to full standard. His original plan to build it as an aluminium track was abandoned for safety reasons in favour of building a conventional road. To ensure the work was quick, it was decided to instead build the road out of sub-base but with no tarmac on top or kerbs. The road was 23 feet (7.0 m) wide, which allowed it to accommodate two-way traffic. The road had toll booths without boom barriers at both ends. The stones for the road came from the local Wick Quarry in Wick, Gloucestershire.

== Operation ==
External media
- Driver's view of the road in November 2014
- A timelapse view of the toll booth

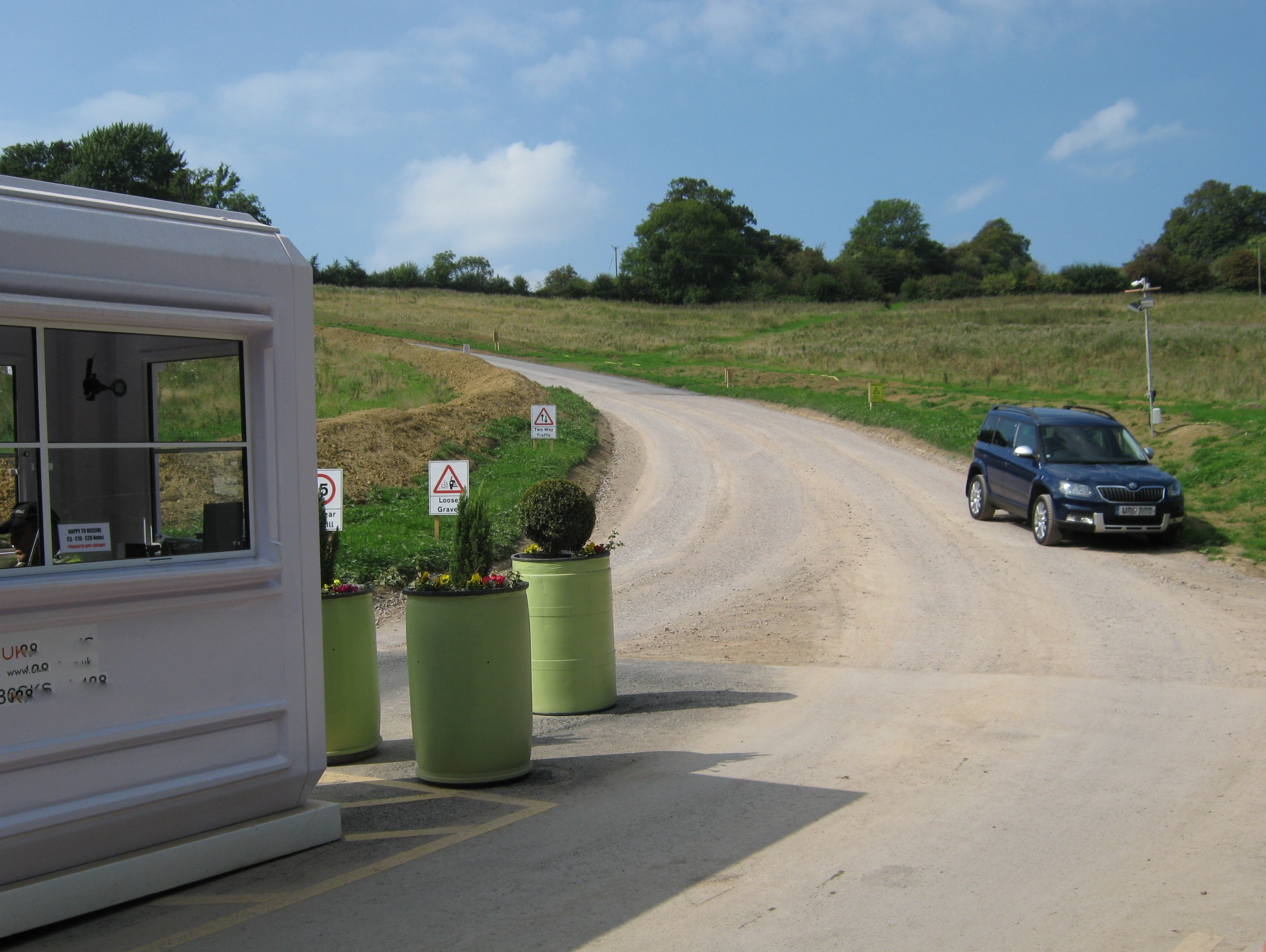
The toll road in operation in September 2014.

The toll road officially opened on 1 August 2014, at which point the A431 road had been closed for six months. When it opened, it was the first private toll road in the United Kingdom to be built in over 100 years, and was the only extant toll road of its kind at the time. Watts' original estimate when building the road was that 150,000 cars would have to use the road in order for him be able to make back his costs; this was roughly equivalent to 1,000 cars using the road every day. The road was open twenty-four seven, and Watts estimated the daily operating cost of the toll at £1,000.

The toll road cost £2 for cars, which was slightly less than the petrol cost at the time for driving the diversion. (Note: The standard petrol price per mile of 25p multiplied by the 14 mile diversion gives a price of £3.50, above the £2 for the toll.) The toll was reduced to £1 for motorbikes, Kelston villagers and the parents of local schoolchildren; emergency service vehicles were allowed to use the toll road for free. Only vehicles under 3.5 tonnes (3.4 long tons; 3.9 short tons) were allowed to use the road, and cyclists were not permitted at all. The toll road also offered discounts to drivers who bought tickets in bulk, in an attempt to help local residents. During the annual Kelston Fete festival, which in 2014 was on 25 August, a special concession was made to allow people coming to the fete from Bath use the toll road for free.

By 7 August, the road had been added to Google Maps as a toll road, allowing drivers to be navigated via the road. The 25,000th journey was achieved on 29 August, and the 100,000th journey on 5 October. By 8 October, 2/3 of the necessary revenue had been raised, and Watts claimed that he would be able to break even if the usage of the toll road remained at its current rate. The number of journeys had reached 125,000 by 13 November.

=== Reaction ===
The public response to the road was primarily in support of the toll road, and critical of the council for the length of the closure. The toll road also had a 24-hour CCTV broadcast which livestreamed to the internet, which helped to publicise the toll road.

== Opposition from the council ==
On 16 July, before the toll road opened, the council issued a statement saying that they could not offer any support for the toll road because they had "not been provided with any evidence/information to support the application", meaning that there was no way of ensuring the road was safe. This was due to Watts' failure to submit planning permission before he started building the road. The council elaborated that "in view of public concerns the Council's Planning Enforcement team are currently investigating this matter".

The council forced the operator to apply for retrospective planning permission, claiming that they were unsure if construction and the use of the field as a road could delay the repair works. Watts complied and applied for retrospective planning permission on 13 August, and although a decision had been expected on 3 October, it was delayed until the end of the month. At the request of the council, the road was given a basic health and safety inspection, which it passed; it was also covered by public liability insurance. On their website, they explained that "such a road would have required various statutory permissions which would have taken time to achieve" and that "it would therefore have only been a partial and temporary solution which would have delayed the main repair programme".

The council refused to remove road signs notifying drivers of the A431 closure, which the couple accused the council of hampering traffic. The council claimed the road signs were required by national regulations and could not be removed, but offered to help put up additional signs notifying drivers of the toll. This was done on 14 August, when signs were placed notifying drivers of the toll road's existence were placed alongside the 'road closed' signs in place for the A431. Watts explained that the signs were necessary due to the traffic on the toll road being too low for him to cover his costs.

Despite Watts' efforts, the council continually withheld its decision on the planning permission for the road, with no final result being published by the time the road closed. On the other hand, the council did not make any active attempts to stop the road from remaining open. Watts claimed that the cost of applying for the retroactive planning permission was £25,000, and that it had increased the necessary number of vehicles from 1,000 a day to 1,200, impeding on his ability to break even on his costs.

The council additionally insisted on the completion of an archaeological report on the site, which the toll road accused the council of attempting to bankrupt them for. The council justified this as being due to the toll's route being part of an area with medieval strip lynchets and field boundary earthworks, which meant the toll road could risk damaging ancient archaeology. In response to the council's demand, Race wrote an open letter criticising what she called a "complete lack of support" for the toll road. In response to criticism, the council claimed they had "made a considerable effort to work with Mr Watts and various officers and members have met with him several times. The Council has provided expertise, advice and our ground investigation results free of charge".

== End of operations ==
=== Closure and destruction ===
By September 2014, Bath and North East Somerset Council had already borrowed £2 million to fund the repair works, and received a further £600,000 to support the project. This was due to "more comprehensive works" being needed to repair the road; the council still claimed the road would be finished on time by the end of 2014. The roadworks finished earlier than expected, and the road was ready to open a month ahead of the original schedule. This meant that Watts' revenue would be significantly lower and he would be unable to break even on his costs.

On Friday 14 November, Watts was officially informed by the council that the A431 would reopen the following Monday, and the council released a public statement on their website confirming this; the reopening date was four weeks earlier than what the council originally promised. After 14 weeks of operation, the toll road closed on Monday 17 November in conjunction with the reopening of the repaired section of the A431 at 6:00 am. In that time, a total of 163,000 crossings were made over the toll; this left Watts with a shortfall of £10,000 despite surpassing his original estimate for how many cars would be necessary.

In February 2015, the road was turned back into fields by its original constructors, who did not make Watts pay for the work. HMRC also agreed to waive a shortfall in the balance of VAT due from the revenue of toll fees, which Watts credited to support from Jacob Rees-Mogg, who was the local MP at the time. As of February 2015, Bath and North East Somerset Council still had an outstanding business rates demand of £3,500 against the company. Watts argued that this demand should be dropped as the toll never officially existed as a road, because of which it was not provided with any council services. Kelston Toll Road Limited was officially dissolved on 14 July 2015, having only existed for thirteen months.

=== Legacy ===
People from around the world came to Kelston to use the road as a tourist experience, having seen it online or on TV, and Watts received postcards from around the world congratulating him for building the road. Watts claims that despite his losses, he would do it again due to the fun and positive feedback. Watts also received cakes, chocolates, and whisky from thankful locals when they heard that the toll road was closing. In February 2015, Watts claimed he was planning to produce limited edition memorabilia to remember the road. When the road closed, Race collected stones from the road and painted eyes on them before proceeding to sell them as souvenirs.

In February 2021, the Institute of Economic Affairs used the Kelston toll road as an example of a successful toll road in order to promote its view that private toll roads should be allowed en masse as part of a more liberal planning system.

== See also ==
- List of toll roads in the United Kingdom
