= Weston railway station (Bath) =

Former railway station in England

Coordinates: 51.3835°N 2.3864°W

Weston (Bath)
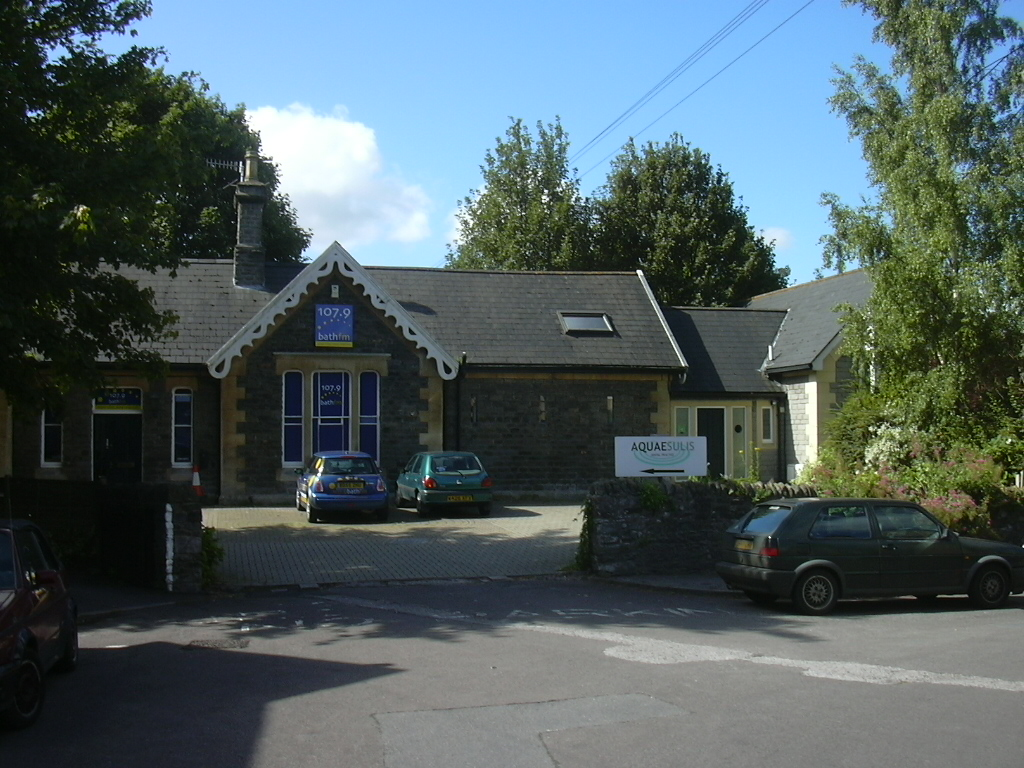
- Weston (Bath) station frontage

General information
- Location: Weston, Bath and North East Somerset; England
- Grid reference: ST731650
- Platforms: 2

Other information
- Status: Disused

History
- Pre-grouping: Midland Railway
- Post-grouping: London, Midland and Scottish Railway; London Midland Region of British Railways

Key dates
- 4 August 1869: Opened (Weston)
- 1 October 1934: Renamed (Weston (Bath))
- 21 September 1953: Closed
Location

Weston (Bath) was a small railway station in Bath, England, about a mile west of Bath Green Park railway station on the Midland Railway line.

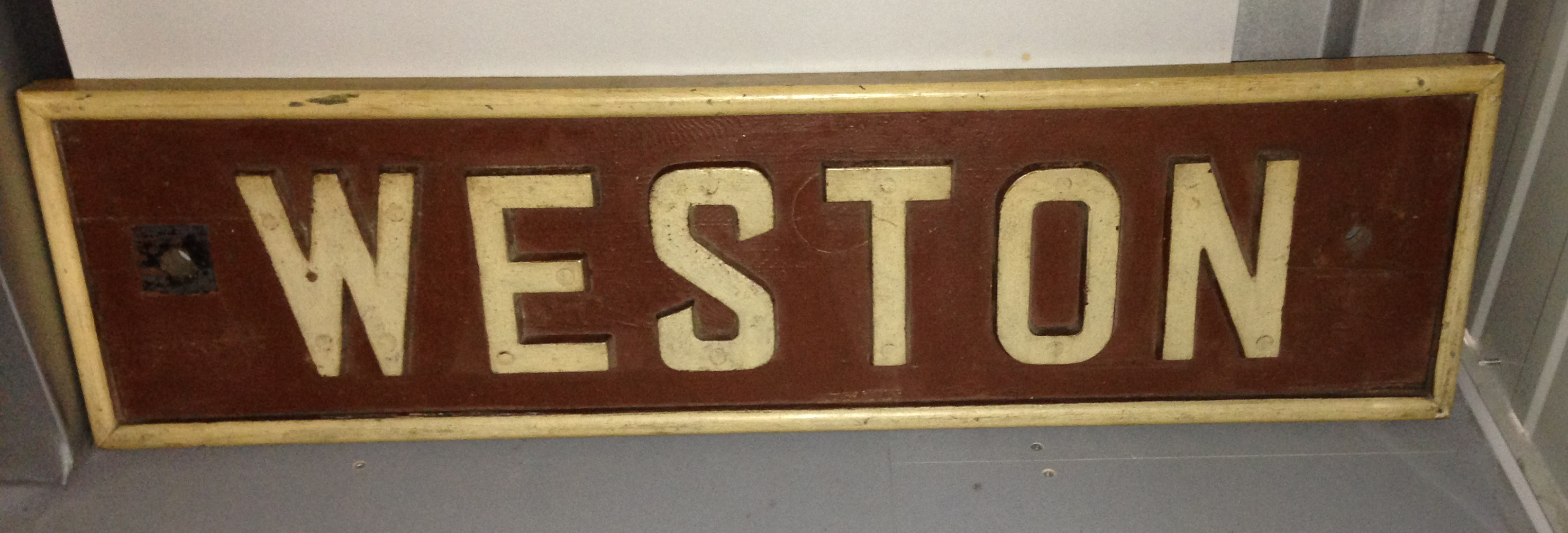
Signalbox nameplate from level crossing box at Weston (Bath) railway station

It was opened in 1869 when the Midland Railway's Bath branch was opened. It was served by stopping trains to Mangotsfield and the Bristol Midland Railway terminus at St Philips or Bristol Temple Meads, via Bitton and Oldland Common.

Originally called just Weston, its name was altered to Weston (Bath) in 1934 to avoid confusion with Weston-super-Mare (usually referred to by local people as just "Weston"). The station closed in 1953, killed by competition from bus services, though the railway line through the station did not close until 1966 for passengers and 1971 for goods trains. The next station to the west on the same line, Kelston (for Saltford), had closed at the end of 1948. The line into St Philips closed on the same day as Weston.

The station was named after the Weston suburb of Bath, but was some distance from Weston village in the area called Lower Weston that now forms part of the Newbridge area of Bath.

The station building still exists and is used as offices, formerly including the studio of the now defunct Bath FM radio station. A signal box at the level crossing on Station Road was demolished when the line was shut.

== Services ==
Preceding station	Disused railways	Following station
Kelston; Line and station closed	Midland Railway; Mangotsfield and Bath Branch Line	Bath Green Park; Line and station closed

== See also ==
- Avon Valley Railway
