= Kelston railway station =

Former railway station in England

Coordinates: 51°24.3245′N 2°27.0143′W

Kelston for Saltford

General information
- Location: Kelston, Bath and North East Somerset; England
- Grid reference: ST688671
- Platforms: 2

Other information
- Status: Disused

History
- Pre-grouping: Midland Railway
- Post-grouping: London, Midland and Scottish Railway; London Midland Region of British Railways

Key dates
- 1 December 1869: Opened
- 1 January 1949: Closed
Location

Kelston was a small railway station about four miles west of Bath on the Midland Railway's Mangotsfield and Bath Branch Line.

== History ==
Kelston Station was opened in 1869 when the Midland Railway opened its Mangotsfield to Bath branchline. The station was located a short distance across some fields from the village of Kelston and closer to the village of Saltford on the other side of the River Avon, which it was connected to by a footpath that ran alongside the railway on the bridge over the river. For many years the station was known as "Kelston (for Saltford)", although Saltford had its own station on the Great Western Main Line.
The station generated little traffic apart from race days at Bath Racecourse, which could be reached by a three-mile trek over the fields, mostly uphill, or regatta days at Saltford.
The station closed at the end of 1948, although the line remained open for passenger traffic until March 1966 and for goods to Bath Gasworks until 1971.

The station was destroyed by fire in 1882.

== Services ==
The station was served by local trains between Bristol St Philips or Bristol Temple Meads and Bath Green Park via Mangotsfield and Bitton.

Preceding station	Disused railways	Following station
Bitton; Line closed; station open	Midland Railway; Mangotsfield and Bath Branch Line	Weston (Bath); Line and station closed

== Future ==
The Avon Valley Railway plans to reopen Kelston station as part of their southern extension to Bath.

Preceding station	Heritage railways	Following station
Proposed extension
Avon Riverside towards Oldland Common Halt	Avon Valley Railway	Bath Newbridge Terminus
