= Bath railway station =

Bath railway station may refer to one of the following railway stations in Bath, England:

- Bath Green Park railway station, former Somerset & Dorset Railway station closed in 1966
- Bath Spa railway station, current Great Western Main Line station
- Weston railway station (Bath), former Somerset & Dorset Railway station closed in 1955
