= The Old Crown, Kelston =

Grade II listed pub in Kelston, Somerset

The Old Crown Inn
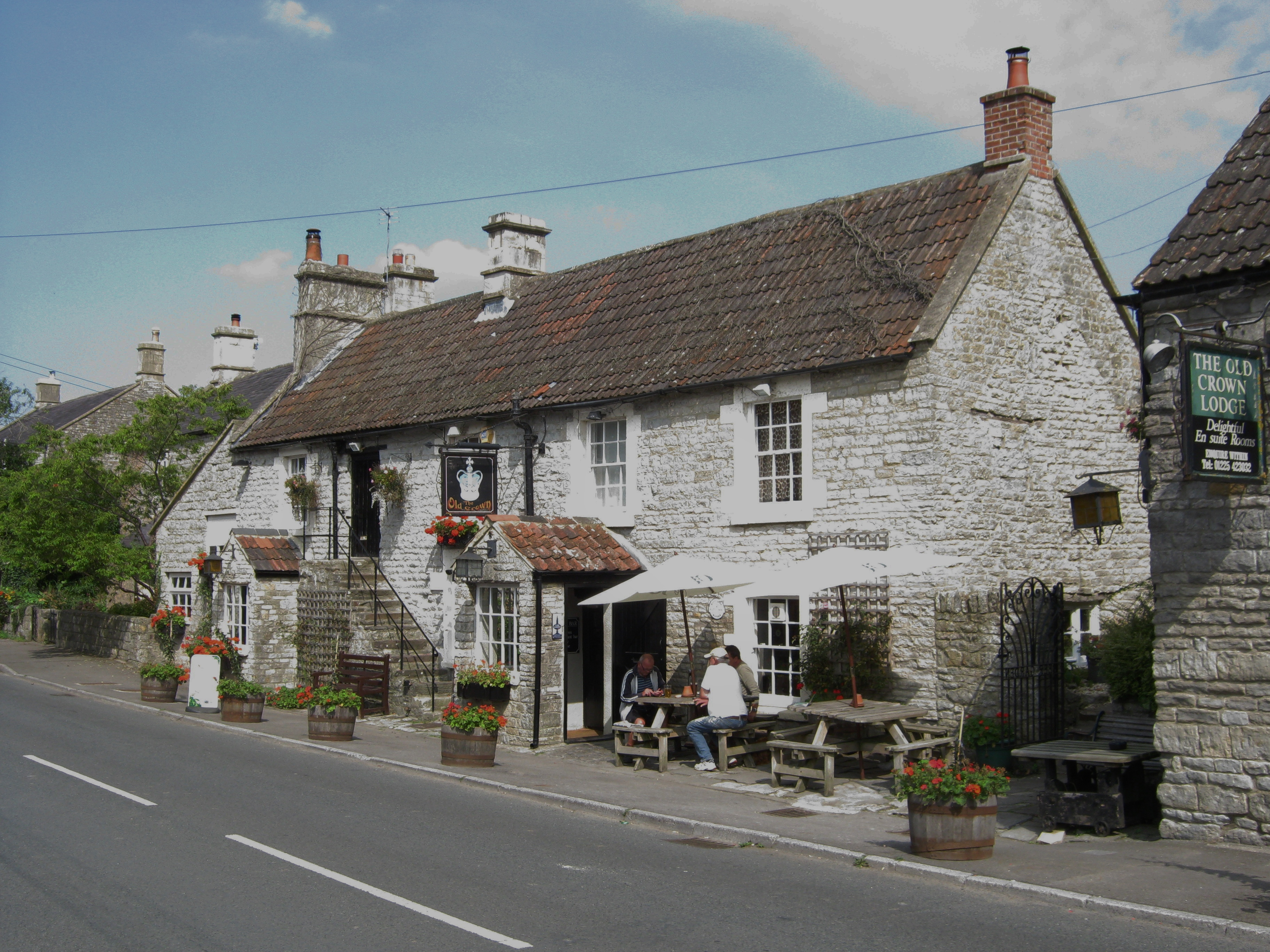
- The pub as it appeared in 2014
- Interactive map of the The Old Crown Inn area

General information
- Location: Kelston, Somerset, United Kingdom
- Coordinates: 51.4035°N 2.4322°W

Website
- oldcrownkelston.com

Listed Building – Grade II
- Official name: The Old Crown Inn
- Designated: 14 August 1984
- Reference no.: 1288463

The Old Crown is a pub in Kelston, Somerset. It is featured in the Good Beer Guide by the Campaign for Real Ale and is Cask Marque accredited. The pub is owned by the St Austell Brewery. It is regularly cited as one of the best places visitors to Kelston should visit. As of November 2025 it is temporarily closed while it awaits new management.

== History ==
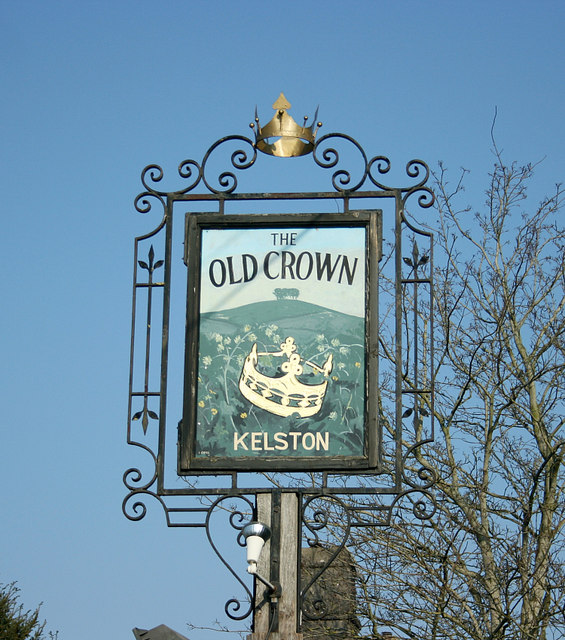
The pub's sign

The pub building is an old coaching inn from the late 1700s; it has been grade II listed since 1984. On 14 March 2018, the pub received a two-star food hygiene rating by the Food Standards Agency due to its non-hygienic handling of food. However, the landlord claimed in April that the issues had been resolved and that the pub remained busy. The pub closed temporarily due to the COVID-19 lockdown but had opened again by July 2020.

=== Kelston toll road ===
It was in The Old Crown in May 2014 that entrepreneur Mike Watts created the idea of building a temporary toll road to circumvent the A431 closure through Kelston. The closure had affected local businesses, including the pub whose revenue was reported to be down 30–40% due to the lost traffic. The toll road operated for 14 weeks, and the pub promised to pay the toll fee for its customers. In November 2025, the pub suddenly closed to customers as its tenants decided to leave for personal reasons. The pub remains temporarily closed while its owners search for a new leaseholder to run it.

== Facilities ==
The pub has two bars, and until January 2016 it was the only pub to have working cash register handpumps still in use. The pub has a car park situated across the A431 road and is served directly by bus. The pub is dog-friendly.
