= Avon Riverside railway station =

Railway station near Bitton, England

Avon Riverside
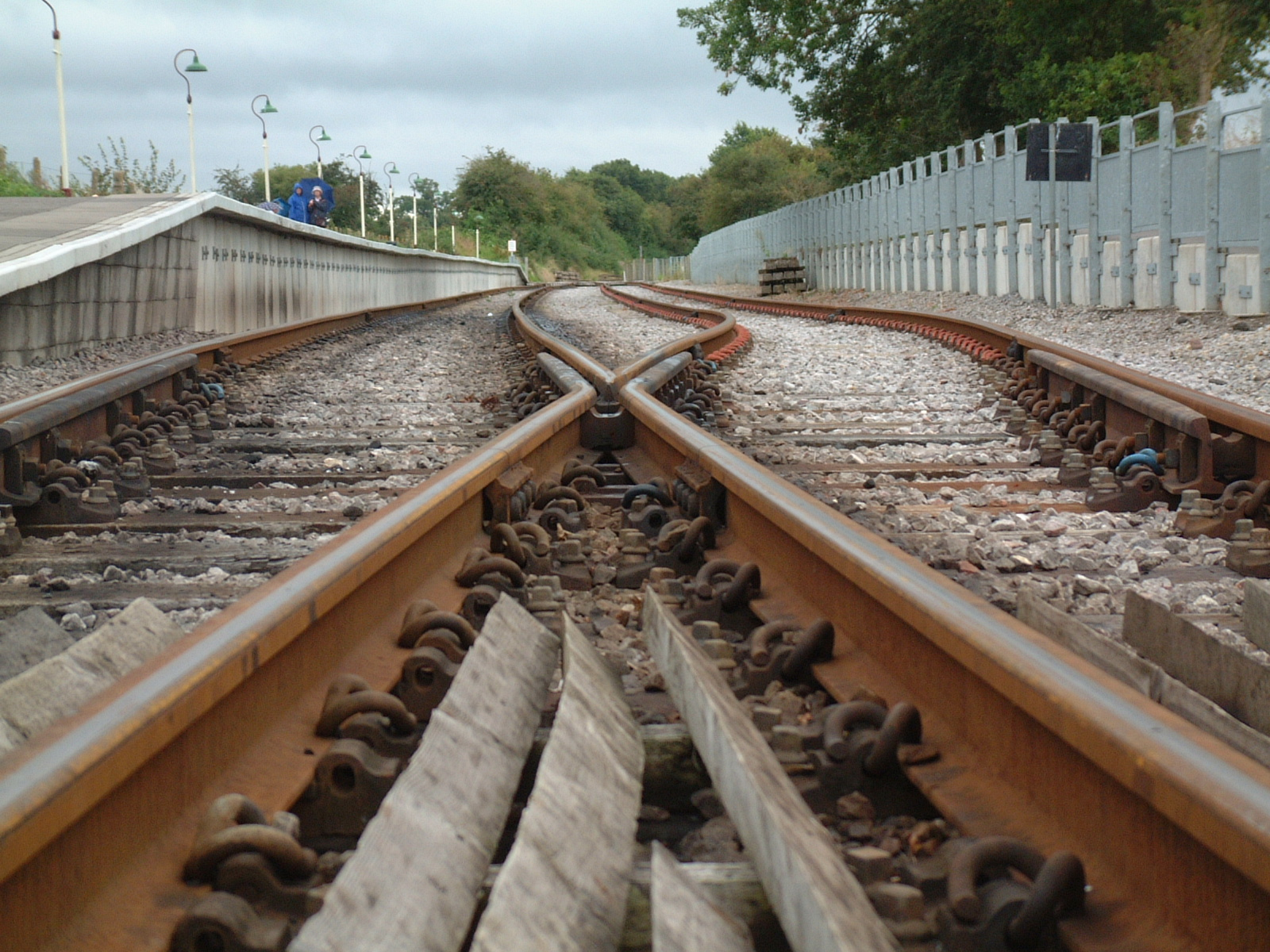
- Avon Riverside railway station, viewed from the level crossing

General information
- Location: Bitton, Bath and North East Somerset; England
- Coordinates: 51.416373°N 2.458526°W
- Grid reference: ST682686
- System: Station on heritage railway
- Owner: Avon Valley Railway
- Platforms: 1

Key dates
- 1 May 2004: Opened as station on the Avon Valley Railway
Location

Avon Riverside is the newest station (and current terminus) of the Avon Valley Railway. It opened on 1 May 2004.

Unlike the other two stations on the railway, there was no original mainline station here.

The station was built in 2004 by the AVR, to allow connections to the local country park and the river landing stage.

There is no vehicle access to Avon Riverside. Access is provided for cyclists and walkers by the Bristol and Bath Railway Path, and by train from Bitton.

== River boats ==
Passengers can leave the train at Avon Riverside for a scenic boat trip on the River Avon. This is timetabled to link up with the railway service in both directions.

== Services ==
Preceding station	Heritage railways	Following station
Bitton towards Oldland Common Halt	Avon Valley Railway	Terminus
Proposed extension
Bitton Line and station open towards Oldland Common Halt	Avon Valley Railway	Kelston Line and station closed towards Bath Newbridge
