= A431 road =

Road in Western England

Coordinates: 51.42332°N 2.45553°W

A431

Major junctions
- From: Bristol
- A4 A4175 A4174 A420
- To: Bath

Location
- Country: United Kingdom
- Constituent country: England

Road network
- Roads in the United Kingdom; Motorways; A and B road zones

The A431 is an A road running from Bristol to Bath in England. It runs parallel to, and about 3 miles (4.8 km) to the north of, the A4, the principal route between Bristol and Bath on the south side of the River Avon.

== Route ==
The A431 begins at a junction with the A420 road to Chippenham at St George, about 1 mile (1.6 km) east of central Bristol. From there it runs through Hanham, Longwell Green, Bitton and Kelston. It passes around the edge of Kelston Round Hill, and past the estate of Sir John Hawkins to Newbridge, Bath, where it joins the A4 which continues to central Bath. Some of the road runs on the alignment of a Roman road between Bristol and Bath.

== History ==
What is now the A431 was the upper turnpike between Bristol and Bath, north of the River Avon (the lower turnpike, south of the Avon, being the A4). Both roads were turnpiked by the Bath Trust in 1707. The Bristol Trust attempted to turnpike the western half of the upper road, but faced opposition from colliers at Kingswood, and it was not fully completed until the 1740s. By the 19th century, the Upper Bristol Road to Kelston was described as a "pleasing and nearly level ride".

When roads were first numbered in 1923, the A431 formed the full extent of the upper Bristol – Bath turnpike as far as the old Post Office at the corner of George Street and Milsom Street. In 1935, the Ministry of Transport rerouted the A4 along this route towards Bristol and Avonmouth, curtailing the A431 to its current eastern point at Newbridge.

=== Kelston Park landslip ===
In February 2014 the road was closed near Kelston Park due to a landslip. The closure lasted until 17 November 2014 as the ground continued to move.

Deeper pilings were found necessary as the works progressed, taking total repair costs to about £2 million.

Local entrepreneur Mike Watts created a private toll road over agricultural land to bypass the closed section, which opened in August 2014.

== See also ==
- British road numbering scheme
