= Bitton railway station =

Disused railway station in Bitton, Gloucestershire

Bitton
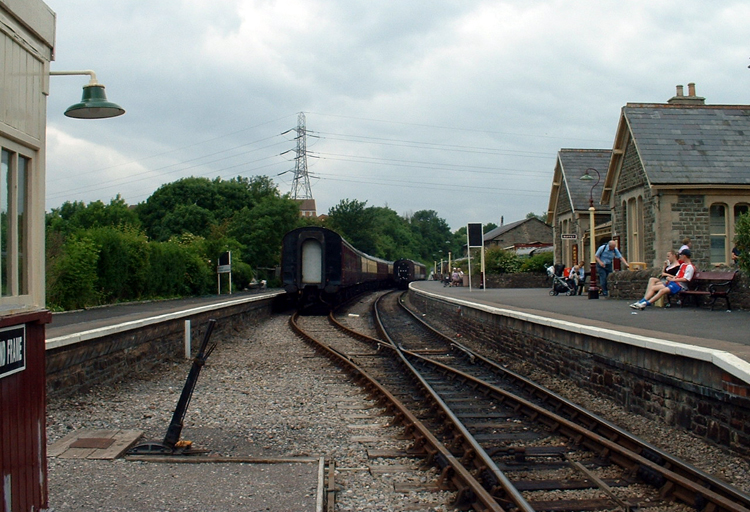

General information
- Location: Bitton, South Gloucestershire; England
- Coordinates: 51.431048°N 2.476366°W
- Grid reference: ST669703
- System: Station on heritage railway
- Operator: Avon Valley Railway
- Platforms: 2

History
- Original company: Midland Railway
- Pre-grouping: Midland Railway
- Post-grouping: London, Midland and Scottish Railway; London Midland Region of British Railways

Key dates
- 4 August 1869: Opened
- 5 July 1965: Closed to freight
- 7 March 1966: Closed to passengers
- 1972: Reopened as heritage station
Location

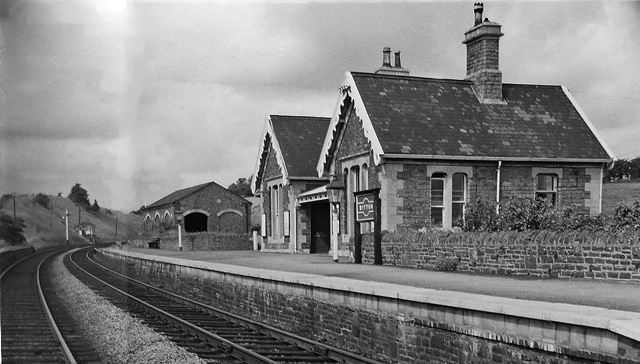
View NW, towards Mangotsfield in 1963

Bitton railway station is the main station (and headquarters) of the Avon Valley Railway. It is located near the village of Bitton, South Gloucestershire.

The station was opened on 4 August 1869, however was shut due to the Beeching cuts, closing to freight trains on 5 July 1965, and to passengers on 7 March 1966. However, it was reopened by the Avon Valley Railway heritage railway in 1972.

The station was served by the Midland Railway-operated Mangotsfield and Bath branch line, which now has become the Bristol and Bath Railway Path cycle route.

== Facilities ==
Bitton station contains a booking office, gift shop and buffet - as well as a large outdoor seating area. These facilities are available to cyclists as well as railway visitors.

On 3 September 2007, work began on the construction of a new buffet and toilet block.

== Services ==
Regular services to Oldland Common and Avon Riverside stations run from April to October, mainly on weekends and school holidays.

Preceding station	Heritage railways	Following station
Oldland Common Halt Terminus	Avon Valley Railway	Avon Riverside Terminus
Disused railways
Oldland Common Halt; Line and station open	Midland Railway; Mangotsfield and Bath Branch Line	Kelston; Line and station closed
