= Kelston =

Village in Somerset, England

Coordinates: 51.4020°N 2.4318°W

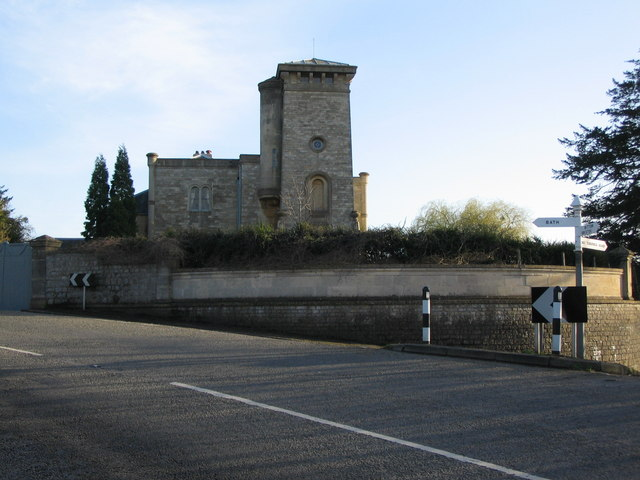
- The Tower House

- Location within Somerset
- Population: 248
- OS grid reference: ST705675
- Unitary authority: Bath and North East Somerset
- Ceremonial county: Somerset
- Region: South West
- Country: England
- Sovereign state: United Kingdom
- Post town: BATH
- Postcode district: BA1
- Police: Avon and Somerset
- Fire: Avon
- Ambulance: South Western
- UK Parliament: Bath

Kelston is a small village and civil parish in Somerset, 4 miles (6.4 km) north west of Bath, and 8 miles (12.9 km) east of Bristol, on the A431 road. It is situated just north of the River Avon, close to the Kelston and Saltford locks. The parish has a population of 248.

== History ==
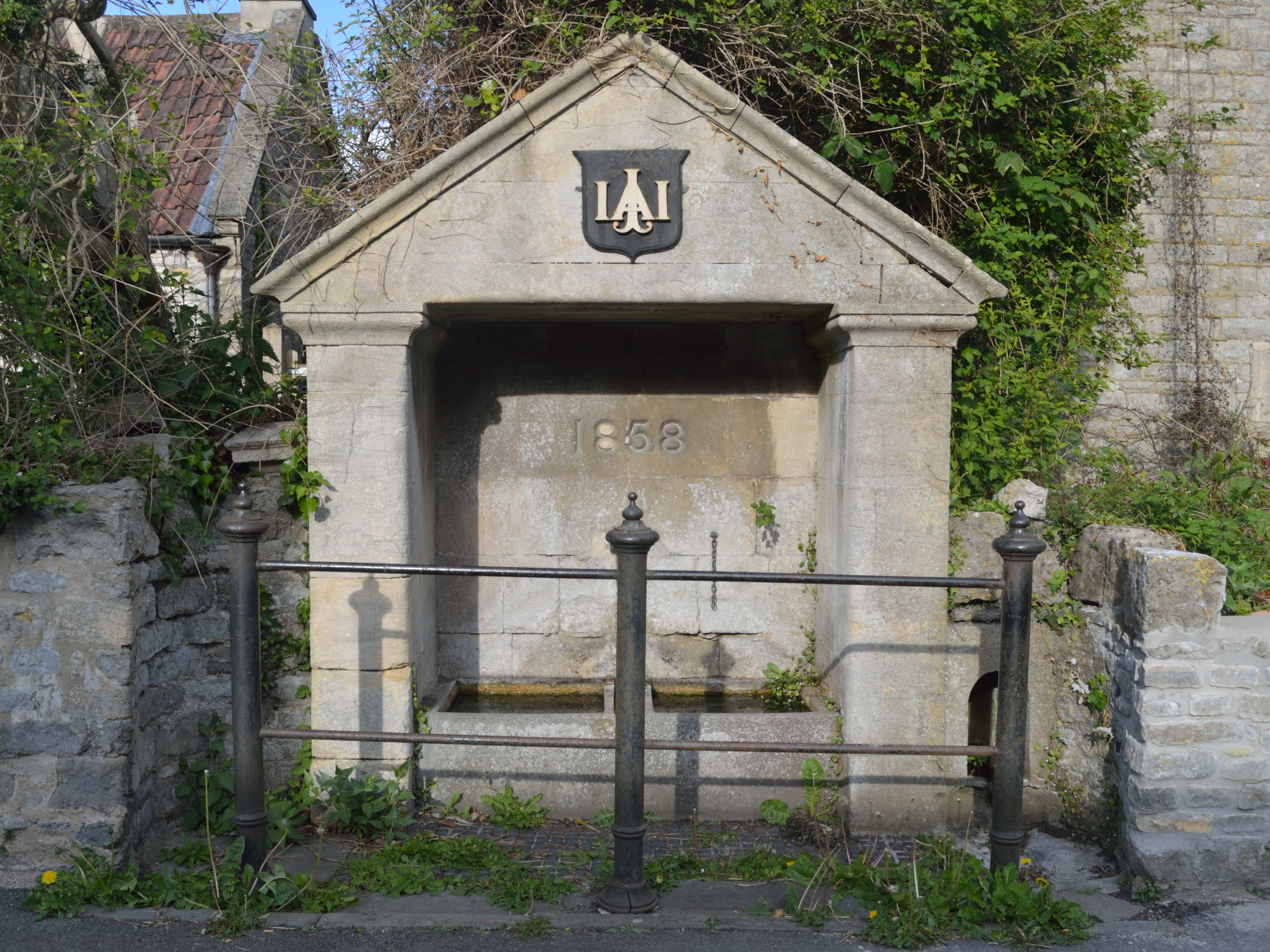
The village pump and trough, bearing the symbol of the Inigo-Jones Estate at Kelston Park, which carried out works in the village in the mid-1800s

Kelston was part of the hundred of Bath Forum. The name of the village was recorded as Calveston in 1178. The familiar -ton ending indicates farmstead or estate. The first part of the name may mean "belonging to a person, possibly Celf or Caelf". However, it may mean a place where calves were reared.

It is the site of the Elizabethan Kelston Manor House, built by the Harington family and demolished in the 18th century.

Kelston railway station was on the now-closed Midland Railway line between Bath Green Park and Mangotsfield. The station was three-quarters of a mile across the fields from the village, near the bridge that carried the line and a footpath across the Avon to Saltford. It was known in railway timetables as "Kelston (for Saltford)". It opened four months after the railway line opened in 1869 and closed at the end of 1948. Trains continued to use the line until its closure in 1966 under the Beeching Axe. The track is now used for the Bristol & Bath Railway Path.

== Governance ==
The parish council has responsibility for local issues, including setting an annual precept (local rate) to cover the council's operating costs and producing annual accounts for public scrutiny. The parish council evaluates local planning applications and works with the local police, district council officers, and neighbourhood watch groups on matters of crime, security, and traffic. The parish council's role also includes initiating projects for the maintenance and repair of parish facilities, such as the village hall or community centre, playing fields and playgrounds, as well as consulting with the district council on the maintenance, repair, and improvement of highways, drainage, footpaths, public transport, and street cleaning. Conservation matters (including trees and listed buildings) and environmental issues are also of interest to the council.

The parish falls within the Newbridge ward of the unitary authority of Bath and North East Somerset Council which was created in 1996 (as per the Local Government Act 1992). It provides a single tier of local government with responsibility for almost all local government functions within their area including local planning and building control, local roads, council housing, environmental health, markets and fairs, refuse collection, recycling, cemeteries, crematoria, leisure services, parks, and tourism. They are also responsible for education, social services, libraries, main roads, public transport, Trading Standards, waste disposal and strategic planning, although fire, police and ambulance services are provided jointly with other authorities through the Avon Fire and Rescue Service, Avon and Somerset Constabulary and the Great Western Ambulance Service.

Bath and North East Somerset's area covers part of the ceremonial county of Somerset but it is administered independently of the non-metropolitan county. Its administrative headquarters are in Bath. Between 1 April 1974 and 1 April 1996, it was the Wansdyke district and the City of Bath of the county of Avon. Before 1974 that the parish was part of the Bathavon Rural District.

The parish is represented in the House of Commons of the Parliament of the United Kingdom as part of the Bath constituency. It elects one member of parliament (MP) by the first past the post system of election.

== Landmarks ==
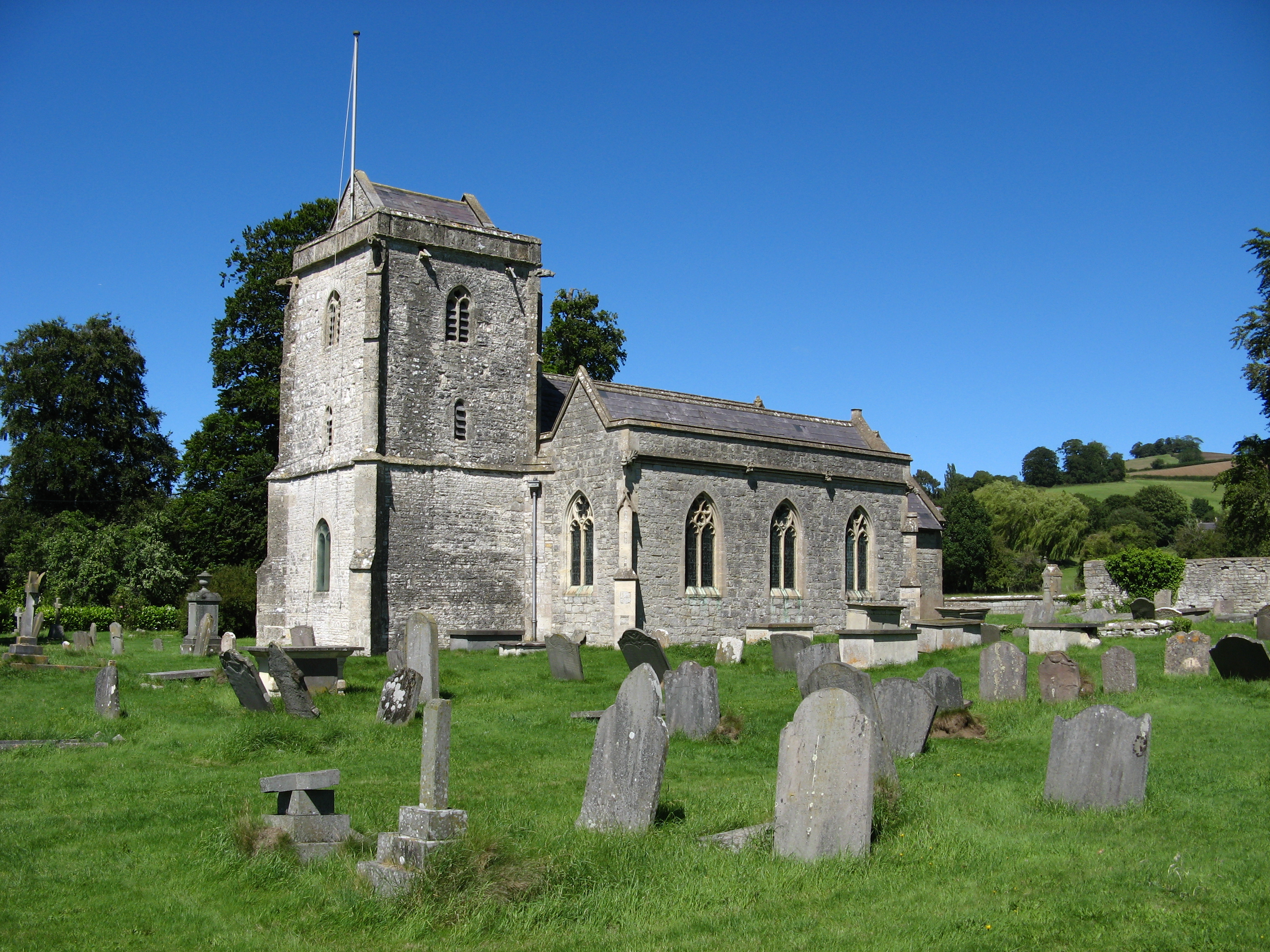
Church of St Nicholas

The churchyard at Kelston is the burial place of Sir John Harington, author, epigramist and inventor of the flush toilet (water closet), the first model of which he installed at Richmond Palace for his godmother, Queen Elizabeth I.

Kelston Park was built around the 1760s by John Wood, the Younger, for Sir Caesar Hawkins, who was the physician to the King. It has been designated as a Grade II* listed building. Kelston also has an 18th-century Village lock-up.

== Religious sites ==
The Anglican parish Church of St. Nicholas dates from the 13th and 14th century although it was heavily restored and rebuilt in 1860 by Benjamin Ferrey.

== See also ==
- Kelston toll road
- Kelston Knoll
