= Oldland Common Halt railway station =

Heritage railway station in England

Oldland Common Halt
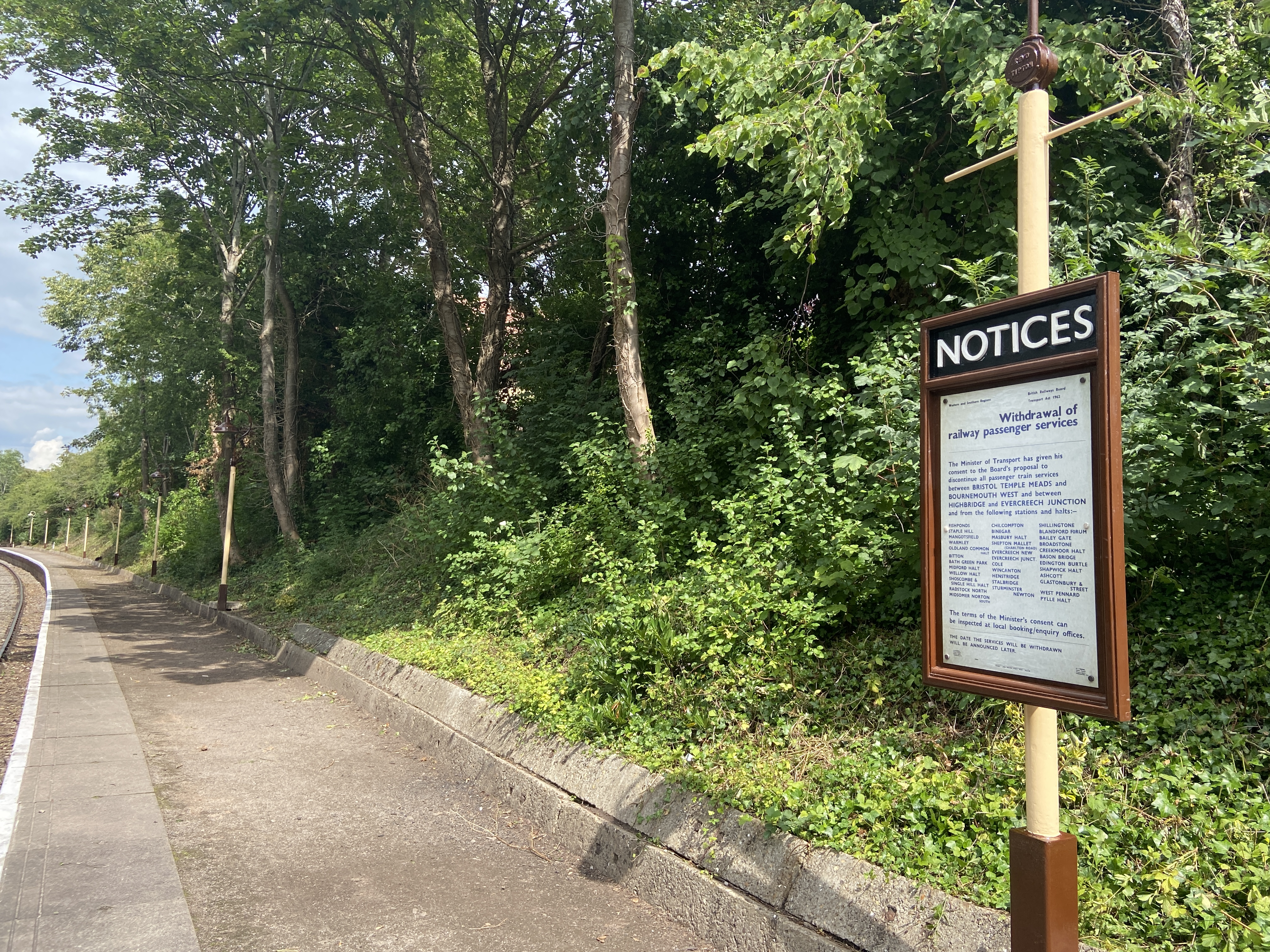

General information
- Location: Oldland Common, South Gloucestershire; England
- Coordinates: 51.443447°N 2.467646°W
- Grid reference: ST676717
- System: Station on heritage railway
- Owner: London, Midland and Scottish Railway; London Midland Region of British Railways; Western Region of British Railways; Avon Valley Railway
- Platforms: 1

Key dates
- 2 December 1935: Opened (Oldland Common)
- 7 December 1964: Renamed (Oldland Common Halt)
- 7 March 1966: Closed
- 6 March 1991: Line reopened with run around loop
- 6 December 1997: Platform reopened on the site
Location

Oldland Common Halt is a railway station on the Avon Valley Railway. The station is on the same site as a previous station which was on the-then LMS Bath branch from Mangotsfield. Then, paths led down to the platforms from North Street, with one now providing access to the Bristol & Bath Railway Path. However, until 1966 there were two platforms, one for each direction of travel.

== Original station ==
Oldland Common's first station opened on 2 December 1935 on the LMS branch line that had been originally opened by the Midland Railway through this site in 1869. The station was intended to serve the growing suburban development in the area. It had platforms built of railway sleepers, and a small ticket office on the footpath that led down from the top of the cutting in which it was sited. In its last years before closure with the line on 7 March 1966, it was designated as an unstaffed halt. Due to its simple construction, it was quickly demolished and swept away after closure.

== Present station ==
The line to the site of Oldland Common was reopened by the Avon Valley Railway on 6 March 1991. A new platform was constructed and opened on 6 December 1997. Passengers are invited to leave the train to watch the engine run round its train.

In 2022, the charitable trust launched a project dubbed the ‘Oldland Common Project’, pioneered by young volunteers within the railway. This was to see the station returned to 1960s when BR Western Region controlled the line, with a chocolate and cream colour scheme. The project saw a successful crowdfunder raise £2,500 towards restoration and repainting of the lamps into their new Western guise, installation of a replica closure poster, fixing of new totem railway and construction of a replica running in board. The project is currently ongoing.

The station lies adjacent to the Bristol and Bath Railway Path.

== Services ==
Preceding station	Heritage railways	Following station
Terminus	Avon Valley Railway	Bitton towards Avon Riverside
Disused railways
Warmley; Line and station closed	Midland Railway; Mangotsfield and Bath Branch Line	Bitton; Line and station open
