= Kelston Park =

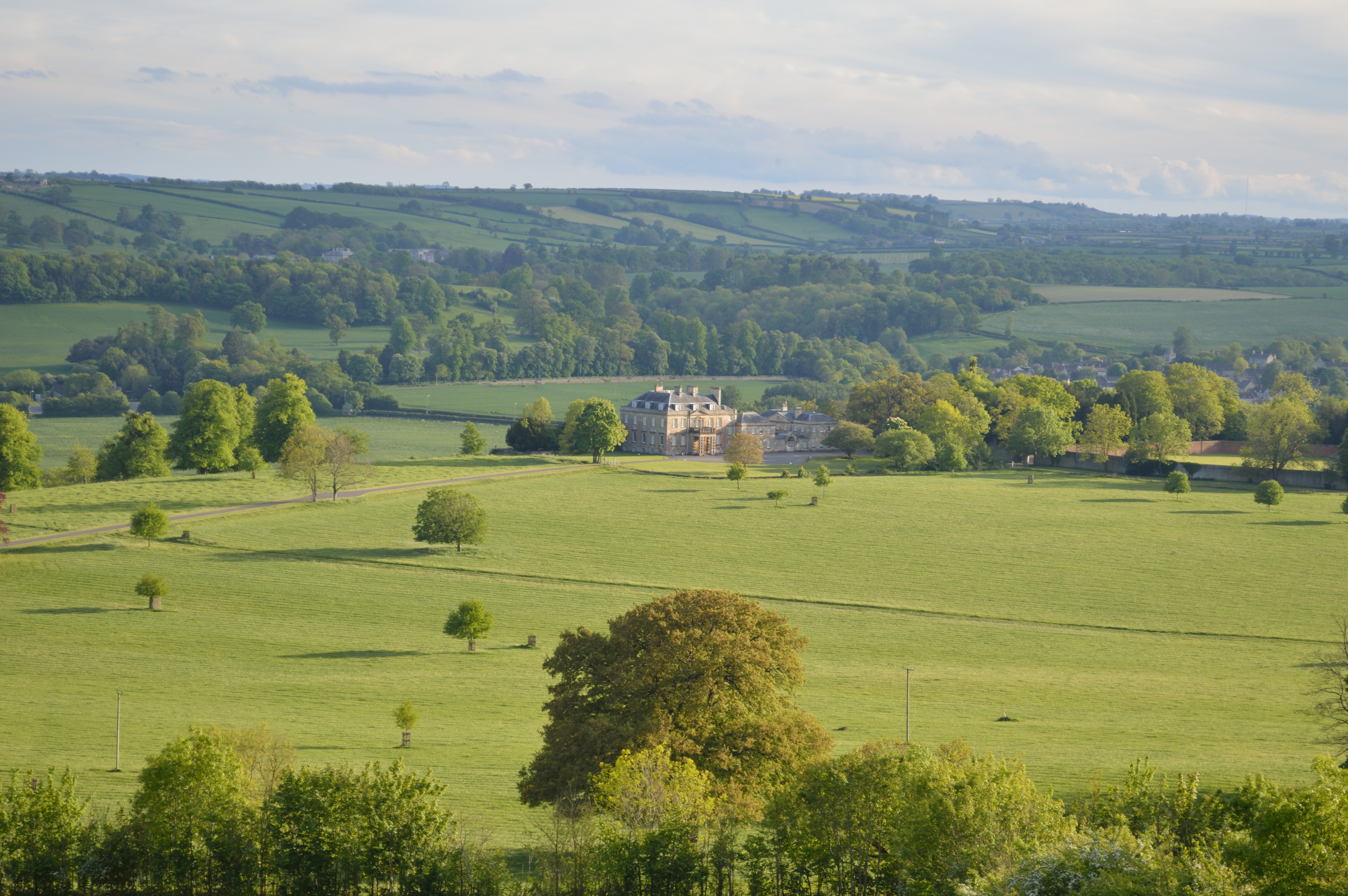

- Location within Somerset
- 51°23′38″N 2°25′47″W
- Location: Kelston, Somerset, England

History
- Built: c. 1760s

Site notes
- Architect: John Wood, the Younger

Listed Building – Grade II*
- Official name: Kelston Park
- Designated: 1 February 1956
- Reference no.: 1215080

Kelston Park is an 18th-century country house in the village of Kelston, approximately 3 miles from Bath in North East Somerset, England. Altogether the house and gardens of Kelston Park cover an area of approximately 75 hectares (190 acres). The house has been designated as a Grade II* listed building, and the garden is Grade II* listed in the National Register of Historic Parks and Gardens.

The River Avon, Bristol & Bath Railway Path, the A4 and the railway track between Bristol and Bath can be viewed from the rear of the building, which is now primarily used as offices.

== History ==
The first house on the site was north of the current building, beside the village church, where a walled courtyard and terraced earthworks are all that remains above ground. The original manor house was built between 1567 and 1574 by John Harington and was later finished by his son, Sir John Harington. It was intended to be one of the grandest houses in the county.

The Tudor mansion was demolished in the mid 18th century, and the current house at Kelston Park was built on a ridge overlooking the Avon River, on the site of the Haringtons' summerhouse. It covers 13,202 square feet (1,226.5 m^{2}) on three floors, and was built around the 1760s by John Wood, the Younger for Sir Caesar Hawkins, who was Serjeant-Surgeon to Kings George II and III. Sir Caesar Hawkins commissioned Capability Brown to lay out the park in 1767–8.

In 1828 the Hawkins family sold the estate to Joseph Neeld, who built many of the outhouses. It passed down through the family to the Inigo-Jones family, who added an entrance lodge and the porch over the main entrance. In 1967 the house was leased to the Methodist Church for use as a training centre.

In 1992 the property was purchased to become the headquarters of the Andrew Brownsword Collection, which made greeting cards; in 1994 the company was acquired by Hallmark Cards. Some of the businesses that have used the offices include McMullen Commercial Property Consultants, R. D. Owen & Co. Chartered Accountants, Harrington Wood Chartered Financial Planners, bzb IT, Steel Media, and Hart Greaves.

By 2019, the use as offices was no longer affordable, in part due to the need for extensive maintenance and renovation work, and a planning application was made to convert the buildings into a hotel. Approval for a 30-bedroom hotel was granted in 2021.

== Description ==
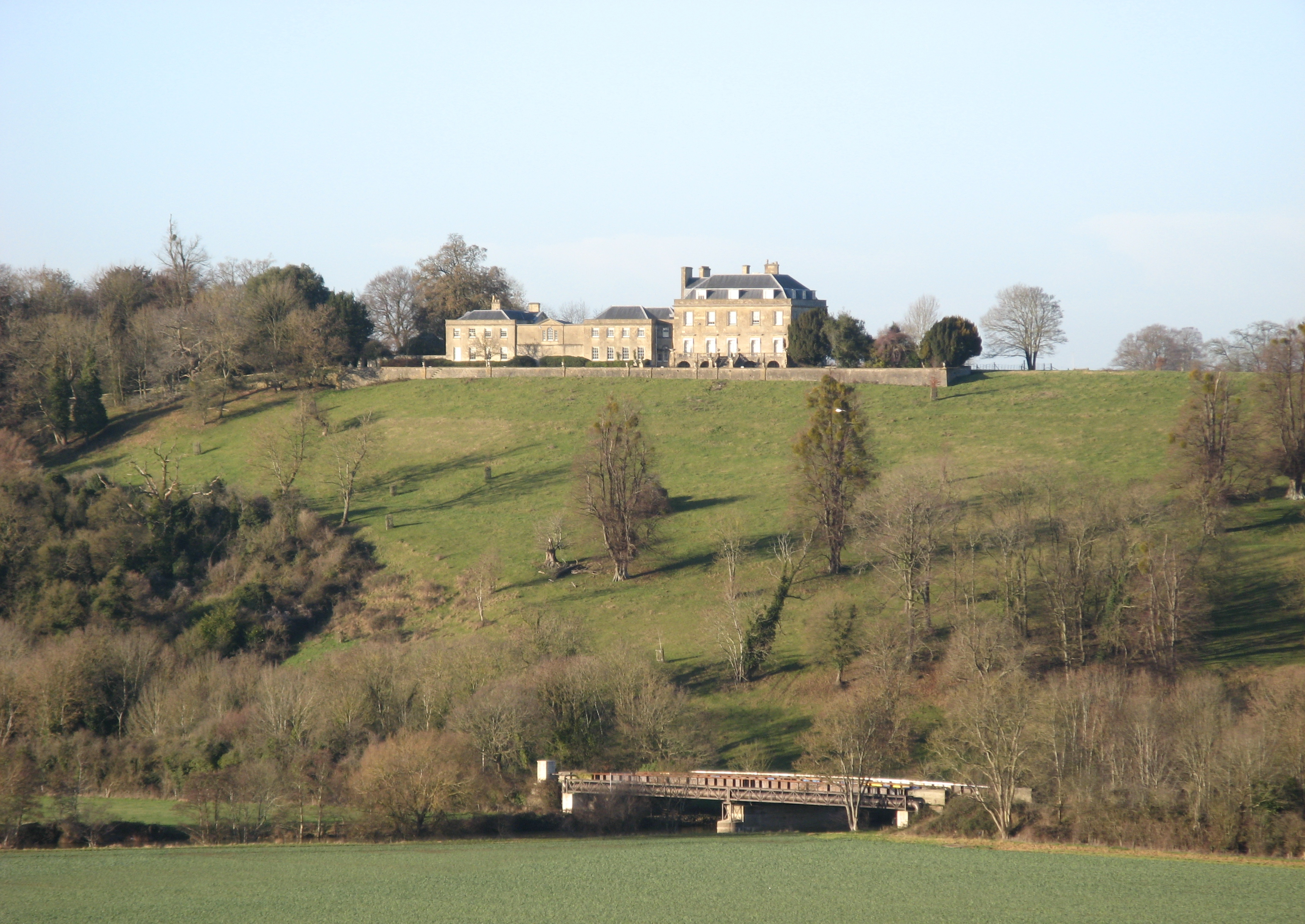
The rear of Kelston Park, from across the River Avon

The mansion house has two storeys and an attic level with a mansard roof, on an almost-square footprint five window bays wide. The front elevation is to the north, with a pediment and open porch with two heavy Tuscan columns. Adjacent to the west is a service yard surrounded by service buildings including kitchens, stables and a coach house. Further to the north-west is a walled garden and former farm buildings.

On the south of the house and service buildings is a wide terrace enclosed by stone walls, with views south and east over the River Avon valley and toward Bath.
