= Avon Valley Railway =

Heritage railway in England

Coordinates: 51.43699°N 2.48477°W

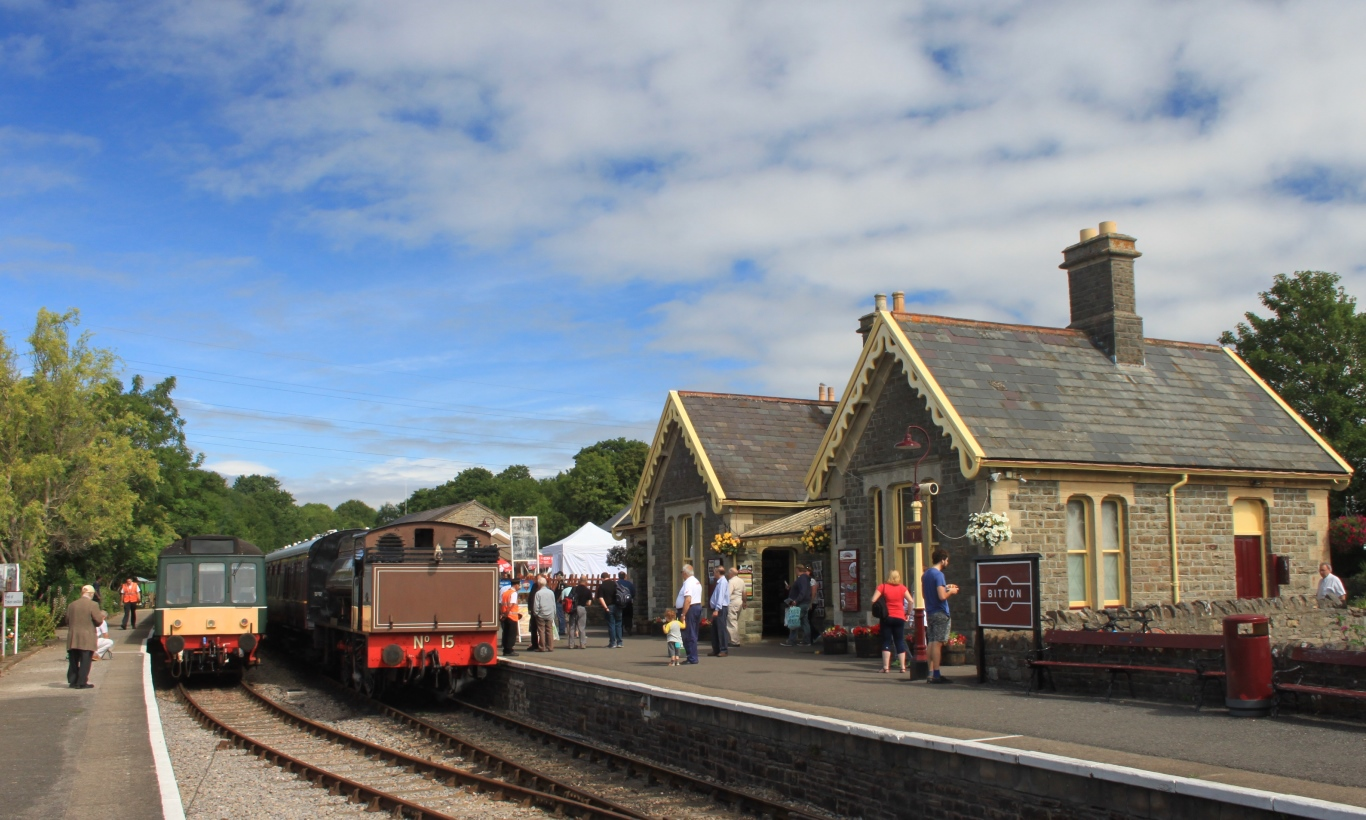
- Bitton railway station and yards from a level crossing with the Bristol and Bath Railway Path
- Locale: Gloucestershire

Commercial operations
- Name: Mangotsfield and Bath Branch Line
- Built by: Midland Railway
- Original gauge: 4 ft 8 1/2 in (1,435 mm) standard gauge

Preserved operations
- Operated by: The Avon Valley Railway Company Ltd.
- Stations: 3
- Length: 3 miles (4.8 km)
- Preserved gauge: 4 ft 8 1/2 in (1,435 mm) standard gauge

Commercial history
- Opened: 1869
- Closed: 1966

Preservation history
- 1974: Reopened
- 1991: Oldland Common Station re-opens to the public, line extended northwards
- 2004: Avon Riverside Station opens to the public, line extended southwards
- Headquarters: Bitton Station

Website
- https://www.avonvalleyrailway.org/

The Avon Valley Railway (AVR) is a standard gauge heritage railway in Gloucestershire, England, operated by a local group, the Avon Valley Railway Company Ltd. The 3-mile (5 km) heritage line runs from Oldland Common to Avon Riverside. It follows the Avon Valley southeast from Oldland Common to Bitton and then it runs alongside the River Avon from Bitton towards Saltford.

The railway shares its route with the Sustrans cycleway and footpath, the Bristol and Bath Railway Path.

Avon Valley Railway shown within Gloucestershire
(grid reference ST664710)

== History ==
=== Commercial history ===
The railway is part of the otherwise-dismantled Midland Railway Mangotsfield and Bath branch line, which was closed in 1966 as a result of the Beeching cuts, due mainly to the Great Western Railway, which also connected Bristol and Bath, being just a few miles to the south.

The railway is perhaps best known for connecting the former Somerset and Dorset Joint Railway (S&DJR), whose northern terminus was at Bath Green Park station, with the London, Midland and Scottish Railway (LMS). The Midland Railway lines along the Avon Valley thus opened up the S&D lines to travellers from the British industrial Midlands. This was particularly so during summer Saturdays when families flocked south to the beaches of Dorset and the English south coast. Many extra trains thus had to be added to the schedule to accommodate this increased demand. Although owned and run by the Midland Railway, many S&D locomotives were often seen working trains along this line.

After the lines were removed, from 2000 the northern section from Mangotsfield to Warmley was used to build a dual carriage development of the A4174 road, although both station sites currently still exist. The remainder of the line was passed from the British Railways Board to Sustrans, who in co-operation with the local councils developed the Bristol and Bath Railway Path. Further development of the heritage railway is wholly dependent on a usage agreement with Sustrans.

=== Heritage railway ===
The Bristol Suburban Rail Society was formed in 1972 by a group of local people including MP Robert Adley with the aim of restoring commuter and weekend steam use to the Bristol–Mangotsfield–Bath and Mangotsfield–Yate railway routes.

Bitton station and its yard, including some trackbed, was leased from British Railways Board by the Bristol Suburban Railway Society. Work progressed slowly over the years restoring the heavily vandalised buildings and laying track north towards Oldland Common and Warmley. Weekend steam-hauled 'brake van' train rides progressed to proper passenger services along the ever-lengthening line in restored 1950s British Railways Mark 1 carriages.

In 1979, the Bristol Suburban Railway Society was incorporated into the Bitton Railway Co. Ltd. and the laid track reached Oldland Common in 1988. By 1992, however, the city of Bristol had expanded greatly, with houses encroaching upon the former railway line, and expansion north to Warmley and Mangotsfield was no longer considered practical. The line thus began to expand south out into the valley of the River Avon. By 2004, it had crossed the Avon and a new station was built to service the Avon Valley Country Park – a large picnic and recreation site – along with a river wharf to provide visitors with connections to river barges and river boat trips.

Building of a new buffet and toilet facility at Bitton station began in 2007 to replace the current buffet and toilets and to increase space for the railway's gift shop. 2024 marked the 50th anniversary since the first trains ran.

== Preservation ==
=== Operations ===
As a tourist attraction, the Avon Valley Railway now handles 80,000 visitors per year. The AVR provides round-trip steam train travel from Bitton Station north to Oldland Common then south to Avon Riverside station. The line is open to travellers on most weekends.

=== Signalling ===
Warmley Signal Box is now used as a community garden on the cycleway with a short section of track that has been used to display locomotives and wagons.

=== Incidents ===
On 24 July 2018, during a shunting operation at Bitton station, two empty coaches ran away for 43 yards (40 metres) on a down gradient until they collided with a level crossing gate closed across the track. The coaches, which had no handbrakes, overrode chocks placed against two wheels. There were no injuries.

== Stations ==
=== Current stations ===
- Oldland Common Halt, although the line was relaid in 1988 the station was not in use until 1991.
- Bitton Railway Station, is the headquarters of the railway. There is a yard, cafe, shop and a goods shed converted in to a workshop where locomotives are maintained and restored.
- Avon Riverside Railway Station, opened in 2004, with access to the riverside picnic area & Riverboat trips. This is a new station and not part of the original infrastructure.

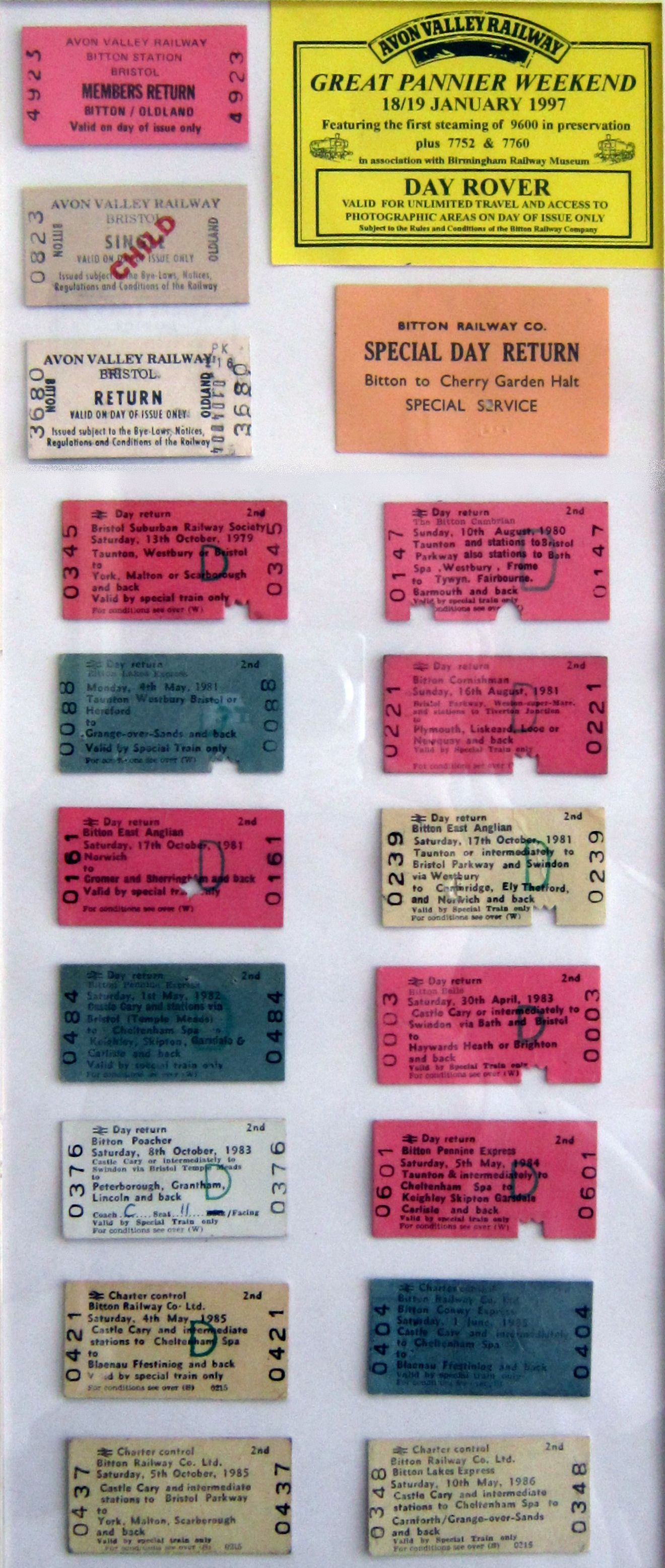
Exposition of AVR Edmondson tickets from 1979—1986

=== Former stations ===
- Mangotsfield Railway Station
- Warmley Railway Station
- Bath Green Park Railway Station

== Extensions to the railway ==
=== Northwards ===
After reopening the station at Oldland Common, focus shifted to extending the line southeast towards Bath.

=== Southwards ===
Work continues to extend the railway south-east towards Bath (potentially as far as Newbridge).

== Rolling stock ==
Avon Valley Railway is home to a number of preserved steam and diesel locomotives as well as a variety of carriages, wagons and cranes.

=== Steam locomotives ===
- GWR 5600 Class no.6695
- TKh49 No. 4015 Karel
- Avonside 0-6-0ST Edwin Hulse
- Fry's Sentinel No. 7492
- Robert Stephenson Hawthorn 0-6-0T No 7151
- Manning Wardle 0-6-0ST No 2015 Littleton No 5
- Fowler 4F 0-6-0 No 44123

=== Diesel locomotives ===
- British Rail Class 31 nos.31101 and 31130 Calder Hall Power Station
- Andrew Barclay 0-4-0DM no.70043

=== Diesel multiple unit ===
- British Rail Class 117 nos. W51339 & W51382 (moved from the Colne Valley Railway in 2026)

== In Media ==
Avon Valley Railway was used as a filming location for BBC medical TV drama Casualty. It has been used for the BBC series The Spartical Mystery and German drama series.

In 2023, the Avon Valley Railway was used as a filming location for the BBC series A Good Girl's Guide to Murder.
