= Research-intensive cluster =

Regions with a high density of research-oriented organizations

Research-intensive clusters (RICs) are regions with a high density of research-oriented organizations. These regions may be informally designated, or may be represented by a formal association. Member organizations are often universities, businesses, and non-profit research institutes.

Closely related concepts include research associations (in general), research parks, technology clusters, and economic clusters. RICs differ from generic research associations in that the member organizations must be geographically close to one another. RICs differ from research parks in that the member organizations are in separate locations within a geographical region, and are not sharing the same exact location. RICs differ from technology and economic clusters because they focus on more research rather than on economic development per se, though for-profit businesses may certainly be members of both types of groups.

Other similar concepts include technology alliances and business parks. Technology alliances focus on economic development, often regardless of research-intensity or geographic density. Business parks provide infrastructure and facilities to businesses, but there is no requirement for research-intensity and all the member organizations share facilities in exactly the same location.

== List of research-intensive clusters ==
Name	Location	Nation	Anchor Universities/Institutes (or Companies)
315 Research Corridor	Columbus, OH	U.S.	Ohio State University, Battelle Institute, etc.
BioValley	Basel, Freiburg, Illkirch	Switzerland, Germany, France	Innovation Center, Unicampus, Research Park, Technology Center
Edinburgh Science Triangle	Edinburgh	Scotland	(many)
Eindhoven-Leuven-Aachen triangle (ELAt)	Eindhoven-Leuven-Aachen	Netherlands, Belgium, Germany	(many)
Global Medical Excellence Cluster	South East England and East Anglia	England	Many, including the University of Oxford, the University of Cambridge, Imperial College London, King's College London (KCL), Queen Mary University of London (QMUL)and University College London (UCL)
Golden triangle	Oxford, London and Cambridge	England	Many, including the University of Oxford, the University of Cambridge, Imperial College London, King's College London (KCL), the London School of Economics (LSE) and University College London (UCL)
Innovation Crescent	Atlanta, GA and Athens, GA	U.S.	Georgia Institute of Technology, Emory University, University of Georgia, etc.
MedCity	London	England	Imperial College London, King's College London (KCL) and University College London (UCL)
Medicon Valley	Öresund Region	Denmark and Sweden	University of Copenhagen, Lund University, etc.
Michigan Life Sciences Corridor	Michigan	U.S.	Michigan State University, Wayne State University, University of Michigan, Van Andel Institute
OstWestfalenLippe Maschinenbau	East Westphalia	Germany	(many)
Oklahoma Research Corridor	Oklahoma	U.S.	University of Oklahoma (OU), OU Health Sciences Center, Oklahoma State University (OSU), University of Tulsa (TU)
Oulu Region	Oulu	Finland	University of Oulu, Technopolis Plc
Paris-Saclay	Paris, Ile-de-France	France	Université Paris-Saclay (2014), Etablissement public Paris-Saclay and Paris Region Economic Development Agency
Pittsburgh Quantum Institute	Pittsburgh, Pennsylvania	U.S.	Duquesne University, Carnegie Mellon University, and the University of Pittsburgh
Red River Valley Research Corridor	North Dakota	U.S.	North Dakota State University (NDSU) and University of North Dakota (UND)
Research Triangle	Raleigh-Durham-Cary-Chapel Hill, North Carolina	U.S.	North Carolina State University, Duke University, University of North Carolina at Chapel Hill
Salzburg Wood Cluster	Salzburg	Austria	(many)
Silicon Fen (or the Cambridge Cluster)	Cambridge	England	University of Cambridge
Silicon Valley	southern San Francisco Bay Area	U.S.	(many)
Styrian Autocluster	Styria	Austria	AVL List, Magna Steyr, Lear Corporation, Johnson Controls, etc.
University Research Corridor	Michigan	U.S.	Michigan State University, Wayne State University, University of Michigan
