= Education in Bristol =

Overview of education in the British city

Bristol is the largest city in South West England, and as such is a centre for culture, research and higher education in the region. The city is home to a prestigious "red brick university" (University of Bristol) and a high-ranking "new university" (University of the West of England). The city is also noted for its investment in the sciences and engineering, particularly its ties to the aerospace industry.

== Compulsory education ==
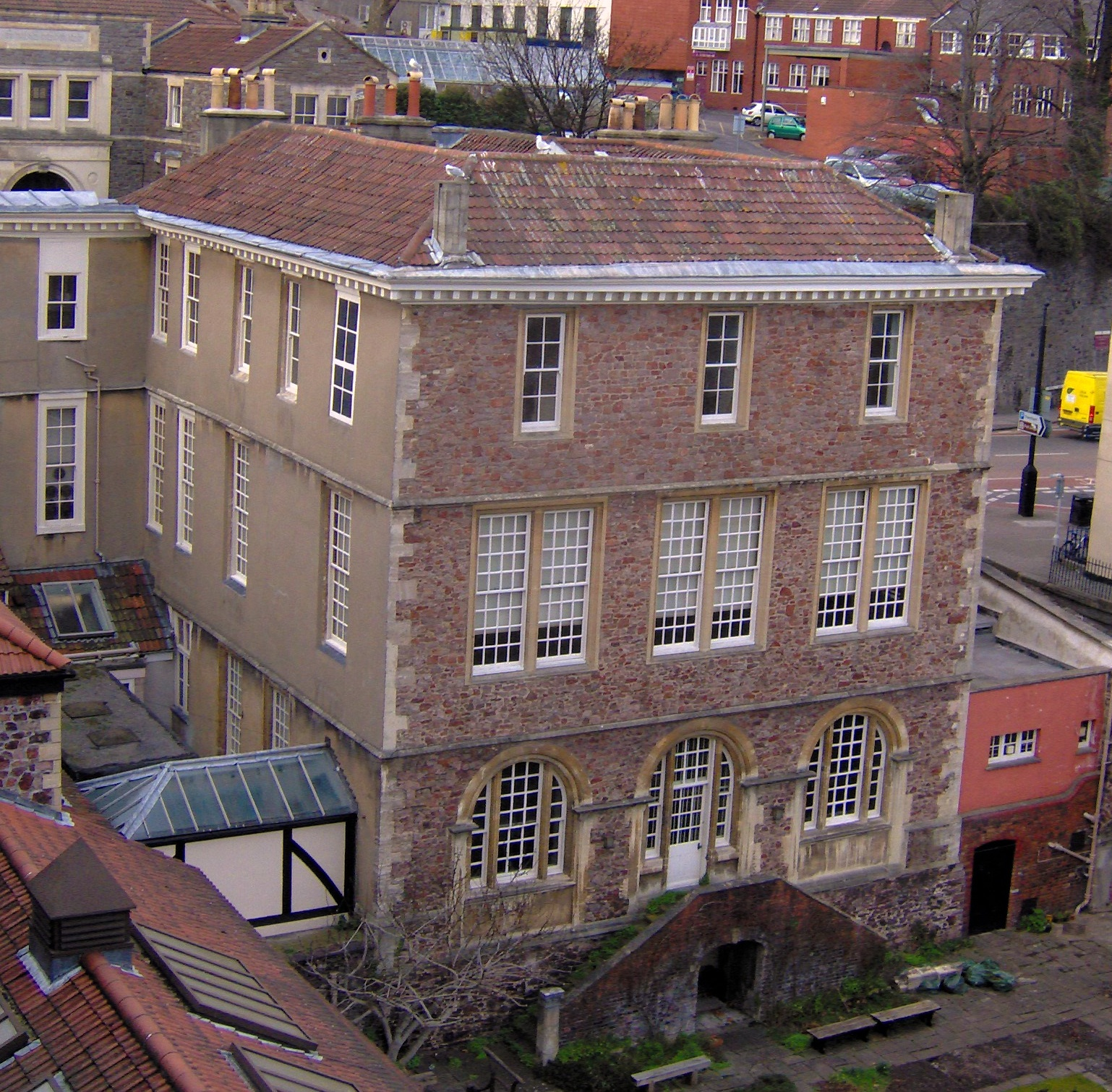
Red Lodge.

A reform school was set up in 1854 by Mary Carpenter, with the financial help of the poet Lord Byron's widow, at Bristol's Red Lodge.

In 1838, the Violet Wills School, an approved school for girls, opened in Brunswick Square, and was later renamed the Bryanston House School. It closed in the 1940s to make way for a new road scheme.

The city has 129 infant, junior and primary schools, 17 secondary schools, and three learning centres. After a section of north London, Bristol has England's second-highest number of private-school places. Independent schools in the city include Clifton College, Clifton High School, Badminton School, Bristol Grammar School, Queen Elizabeth's Hospital (the only all-boys school) and the Redmaids' High School (founded in 1634 by John Whitson, which is England's oldest surviving girls' school).

== Further education ==
=== Sixth forms ===
Bristol has three main sixth forms, they are St. Brendan's Sixth Form College, North Bristol Post 16 Centre and Redcliffe Sixth Form Centre. St. Brendan's Campus is located in Brislington just off the main route through; Redcliffe Sixth Form is, however, located closer to the centre of Bristol, and is to the west of Bristol Temple Meads station and close to St Mary Redcliffe Church to the north.

=== Colleges ===
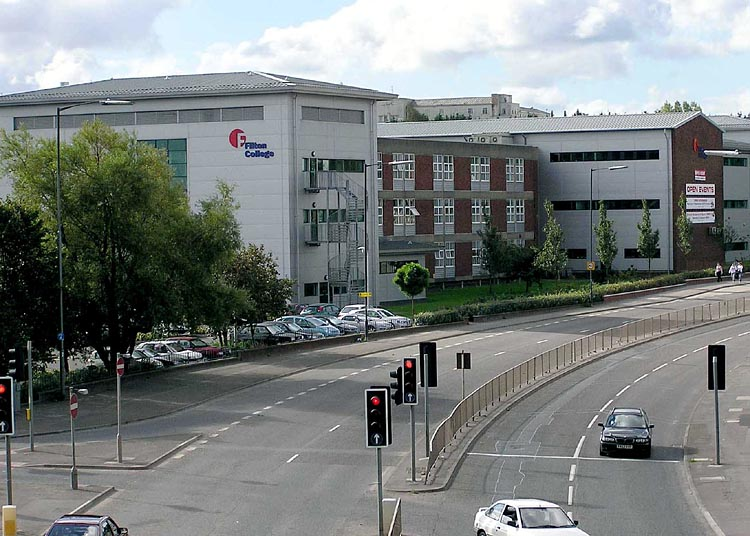
The main Filton College building

Bristol has two main colleges, the City of Bristol College, located on St George's Road, near College Green, with smaller sites across the city, and South Gloucestershire and Stroud College, which has sites in central Bristol, and in Stoke Gifford and Filton in South Gloucestershire, as well as other campuses in the Gloucestershire region.

== Higher education ==
Bristol has two major institutions of higher education: the University of Bristol, a "redbrick" chartered in 1909, and the University of the West of England (formerly Bristol Polytechnic), which received university status in 1992. The University of Law also has a campus in the city. Bristol has two further education institutions (City of Bristol College and South Gloucestershire and Stroud College) and three theological colleges: Trinity College, Wesley College and Bristol Baptist College. Wesley College closed in 2012.

Bristol University, a member of the Russell Group, has 15,000 students, many who come from independent schools and middle-upper-class homes. Its particular strengths lie in Mathematics, Medicine, Engineering, Psychology, Economics, Biology, Chemistry, Management, Politics and Law. The University usually ranks in the top ten of British universities in newspaper league tables and was ranked 49th in the world in 2006, rising to 37th in the world in 2008 and again to 30th in 2013.

The post-1992 UWE, previously known as Bristol Polytechnic, has around 35,000 students and 3,000 academic staff, UWE is the larger of the two universities in the city. 86% of students at UWE are from state schools.

In September 2008, the Bristol Institute of Modern Music opened as an offshoot of the Brighton Institute of Modern Music. BA (Hons) courses awarded by the institute are validated by the University of Sussex.

In September 2021, South Gloucestershire and Stroud College opened a University Centre at its WISE Campus in Bristol, offering degrees within the college's SGS Sport and Bristol Institute of Performing Arts.

== Science ==
In 2005 Chancellor of the Exchequer Gordon Brown named Bristol one of six English "science cities", and a £300 million Bristol and Bath Science Park was planned at Emersons Green. Research is conducted at the two universities, the Bristol Royal Infirmary and Southmead Hospital, and science is demonstrated at At-Bristol, the Bristol Zoo, the Bristol Festival of Nature and the CREATE Centre.

As well as research at the two universities and Southmead Hospital, science education is important in the city, with At-Bristol, Bristol Zoo and Bristol Festival of Nature being prominent educational organisations.

The city has produced a number of scientists, including 19th-century chemist Humphry Davy (who worked in Hotwells). Physicist Paul Dirac (from Bishopston) received the 1933 Nobel Prize for his contributions to quantum mechanics. Cecil Frank Powell was the Melvill Wills Professor of Physics at the University of Bristol when he received the 1950 Nobel Prize for, among other discoveries, his photographic method of studying nuclear processes. Colin Pillinger was the planetary scientist behind the Beagle 2 project, and neuropsychologist Richard Gregory founded the Exploratory (a hands-on science centre which was the predecessor of At-Bristol). and is home to Adam Hart-Davis, presenter of various science related television programmes, and the psychologists Susan Blackmore, Richard Gregory, and Derren Brown.

Initiatives such as the Flying Start Challenge encourage an interest in science and engineering in Bristol secondary-school pupils; links with aerospace companies impart technical information and advance student understanding of design. The Bloodhound SSC project to break the land speed record is based at the Bloodhound Technology Centre on the city's harbourside.
