= Flying Start =

Flying Start may refer to:

- Flying Start (song), a song by Mike Oldfield
- Flying Start (album), an album by The Blackbyrds
- Flying Start Challenge, a contest run by aerospace businesses and organisations in the South West of England
