= MedCity =

MedCity may refer to:

- MedCity (London), a collaboration of London's Mayor and the health centres of the three academic institutions in the capital
- Med City, a nickname of Rochester, Minnesota
