= SEPnet =

British association of physics departments

The South-East Physics Network, or SEPnet, is an association of physics departments at universities in the South-East of England.

In 2008 it received a grant of £12.5 million from the Higher Education Funding Council for England. and in 2013 received an additional grant of £2.75m

The South East Physics Network is better known as SEPnet, a consortium of physics departments in nine universities.

Its partners are, alphabetically:

- The University of Hertfordshire (joined 2013)
- The University of Kent (Founding member)
- The Open University (joined 2013)
- The University of Portsmouth (joined 2010)
- Queen Mary University of London (Founding member)
- Royal Holloway, University of London (Founding member)
- The University of Southampton (Founding member)
- The University of Surrey (Founding member)
- The University of Sussex (Founding member)

Its associates are:

- University of Oxford
- The University of Reading
- Rutherford Appleton Laboratory

== History and background ==
Until around 2005 there had been a long-term decline in the numbers of students nationally enrolling on Undergraduate degree courses in Physics and Astronomy. As a result, Physics departments and provision in universities was at risk with departments closing. Physics departments ran at a loss and required subsidies to maintain their undergraduate provision. Even universities in the UK's Russell Group were failing to attract enough students to be viable. The Universities in England's South East were felt to be particularly vulnerable and the decision by the University of Reading to close its Physics Department was a call to arms to these universities to take action to prevent closure and bolster their Physics departments. The result was a proposal from six universities to form a network of physics departments and seek funding from the Higher Education Funding Council for England to invest in sustaining Physics in the South East of England. Led by the University of Surrey, the network consisted of the Physics departments at Kent, QMUL, RHUL, Southampton, Surrey and Sussex and was granted a £12.5m grant in 2008 for five years.

SEPnet Phase Two from 2013 onwards is based on an expanded consortium of nine Physics Departments of Universities in the South East of England – with the founding SEPnet members Kent, Queen Mary, Royal Holloway, Southampton, Surrey and Sussex being joined by Portsmouth, Hertfordshire and the Open University with University of Reading joining as an associate. This phase of SEPnet is led by the University of Southampton.

In 2008 SEPnet received a £12.5m grant over five years from the Higher Education Funding Council for England, to support innovative research, a collaborative Graduate School, lectures using video conferencing, regional employer engagement and a schools outreach programme.

In 2013 it received a further £2.75m grant from the Higher Education Funding Council for England and £10.3m from its members to continue programmes from the first phase, to maintain and expand the network, to establish a dedicated regional graduate training programme for physics postgraduate students and address physics specific issues of student participation and diversity.

== Research ==
SEPnet research ranges from investigations into the most fundamental physics (from the smallest matter to the origins of the universe), to the physics of new materials, quantum computing, low temperature physics, nuclear medicine and space science Its research collaboration integrates resources across the region for four main research themes: Atomic & Condensed Matter Physics, Particle Physics, Astrophysics, and Radiation Detection & Instrumentation LOFAR-UK, the first internationally significant new radio telescope in the UK for 40 years, would not have been possible without SEPnet funding and researchers.

== Outreach ==
The SEPnet outreach programme has enabled all partners to engage with more schools, more conferences, more members of the public than individually they could have achieved. This has been a clear case of the whole being greater than the sum of the parts and the network has demonstrably punched above its weight via the central coordination. The more than doubling of undergraduate applications to the network since 2008 and over 115% growth in UG population since 2007 (against a national increase of 30% over that period and nearly 50% above the base case projection in the original SEPnet business plan), the raising of the tariff points required for entry and the high growth in applications for entry in most of the partners accepted to be related to the outreach programme, building on the national interest in physics but surpassing it.

Further evidence of impact in undergraduate provision in the region is the establishment of the entirely new “Applied Physics” course at Portsmouth University. Due to the high numbers of students wanting to do physics in the South East region, a consequence of the SEPnet outreach efforts, Portsmouth have been enabled to start up their new course. This novel programme is targeted at a different set of students from the other partners and is intended to strengthen links with employers and local schools. Having put this in place, the case for Portsmouth to join the consortium as a seventh full member became overwhelming and this was agreed in 2010.

== SEPnet Summer Placement Scheme ==
Each year, SEPnet arranges for undergraduates in their 2nd and 3rd year to conduct eight week placements. The scheme not only provides a transfer of knowledge across the South East of England, it increases the employability of physics students too.

The scheme is highly rewarding to both students and employers. It introduces students to the scientific workplace, and acts as an invaluable resource for employers looking for a fresh perspective on their business challenges.

The programme has been successful at reaching out to employers and in giving undergraduate students real experience of work, and employers experience of the value of physics graduates. The scheme is an exemplar and its value is recognized by students and employers. The programme of internships has been oversubscribed both by students and employers (considerably so in the 2012 scheme). The majority of employers continue to take students in following years and give excellent feedback on students and on the scheme itself.

== The SEPnet Graduate Network ==
The SEPnet Graduate Network (GRADnet) brings together the research strengths of nine leading University Physics Departments that make up the SEPnet consortium in the south east of England to create the largest Physics post graduate school in England. GRADnet works closely with employers to offer a coordinated and bespoke skills training programme for its students designed to meet the needs of students, employers and University researcher groups alike.
