= Elmlea Junior School =

Elmlea Junior School may refer to:

- Elmlea Junior School, Rexdale, Canada: see Rexdale#Schools.
- Elmlea Junior School, Bristol, England: see Education in Bristol.
