= Oxbridge =

Universities of Oxford and Cambridge

Arms of the University of Cambridge (left) and the University of Oxford (right)

Oxbridge is a portmanteau of the universities of Oxford and Cambridge, the two oldest, wealthiest, and most prestigious universities of the United Kingdom. The term is used to refer to them collectively, in contrast to other British universities, and more broadly to describe characteristics reminiscent of them, often with implications of superior social or intellectual status or elitism.

== Origins ==
Although both universities were founded more than eight centuries ago, the term Oxbridge is relatively recent. In William Makepeace Thackeray's novel Pendennis, published in 1850, the main character attends the fictional Boniface College, Oxbridge. According to the Oxford English Dictionary, the first recorded use of the word was by Virginia Woolf, who, citing Thackeray, referenced it in her 1929 extended essay A Room of One's Own. The term was used in the Times Educational Supplement in 1957, and the following year in Universities Quarterly.

When expanded, the universities are almost always referred to as "Oxford and Cambridge", the order in which they were founded. A notable exception is Tokyo's Cambridge and Oxford Society; this probably arises from the fact that the Cambridge Club was founded there first, and also had more members than its Oxford counterpart when they amalgamated in 1905.

== Meaning ==
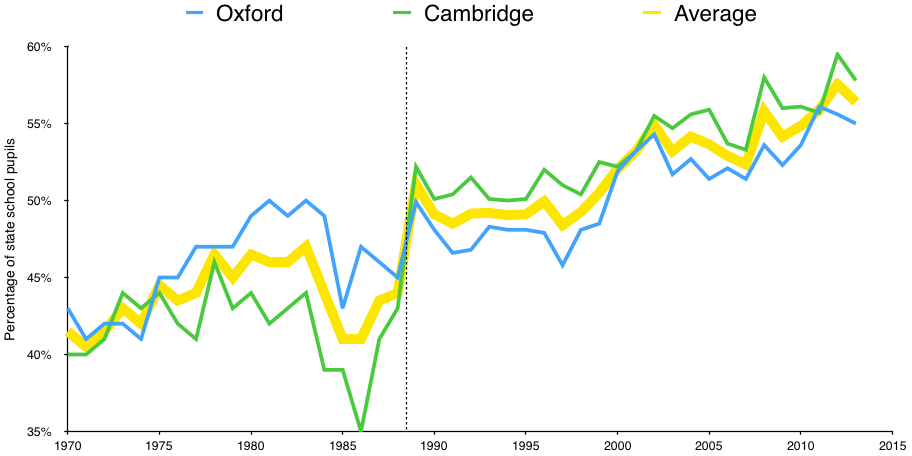
Percentage of state school students at Oxford and Cambridge

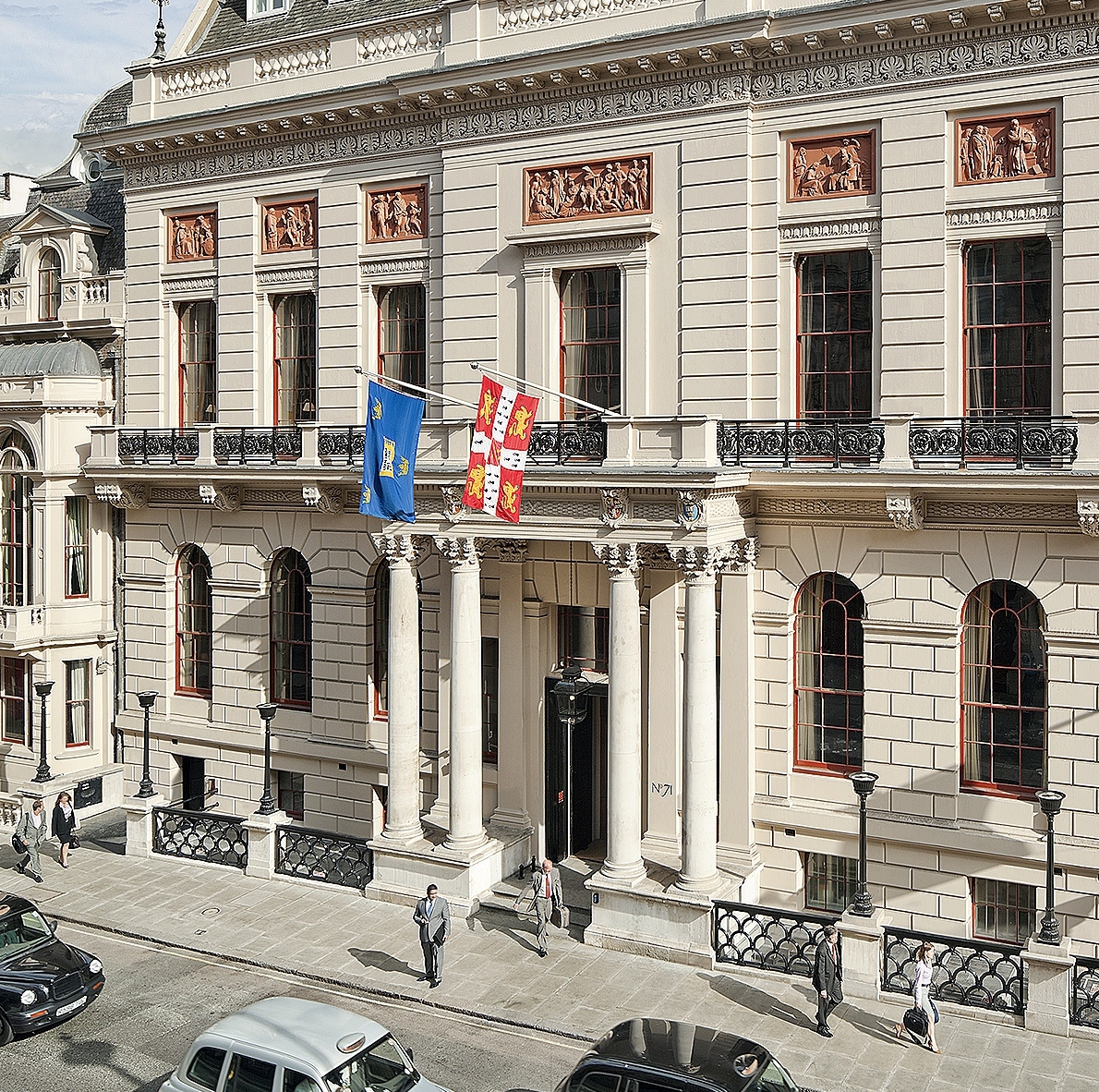
Oxford and Cambridge Club

In addition to being a collective term, Oxbridge is often used as shorthand for characteristics the two institutions share:

- They are the two oldest universities in continuous operation in the UK. Both were founded more than 800 years ago, and remained England's only universities until the 19th century. This duopoly was actively protected, with both universities until the 1820s requiring their graduates to swear not to teach at any other universities in England, and lobbying royalty to close down establishments at Northampton, Stamford and Durham. Between them, they have educated a large number of Britain's most prominent scientists, writers, and politicians, as well as noted figures in many other fields.
- Each has a similar collegiate structure, whereby the university is a cooperative of its constituent colleges, which are responsible for supervisions/tutorials (the main undergraduate teaching method, unique to Oxbridge), accommodation and pastoral care.
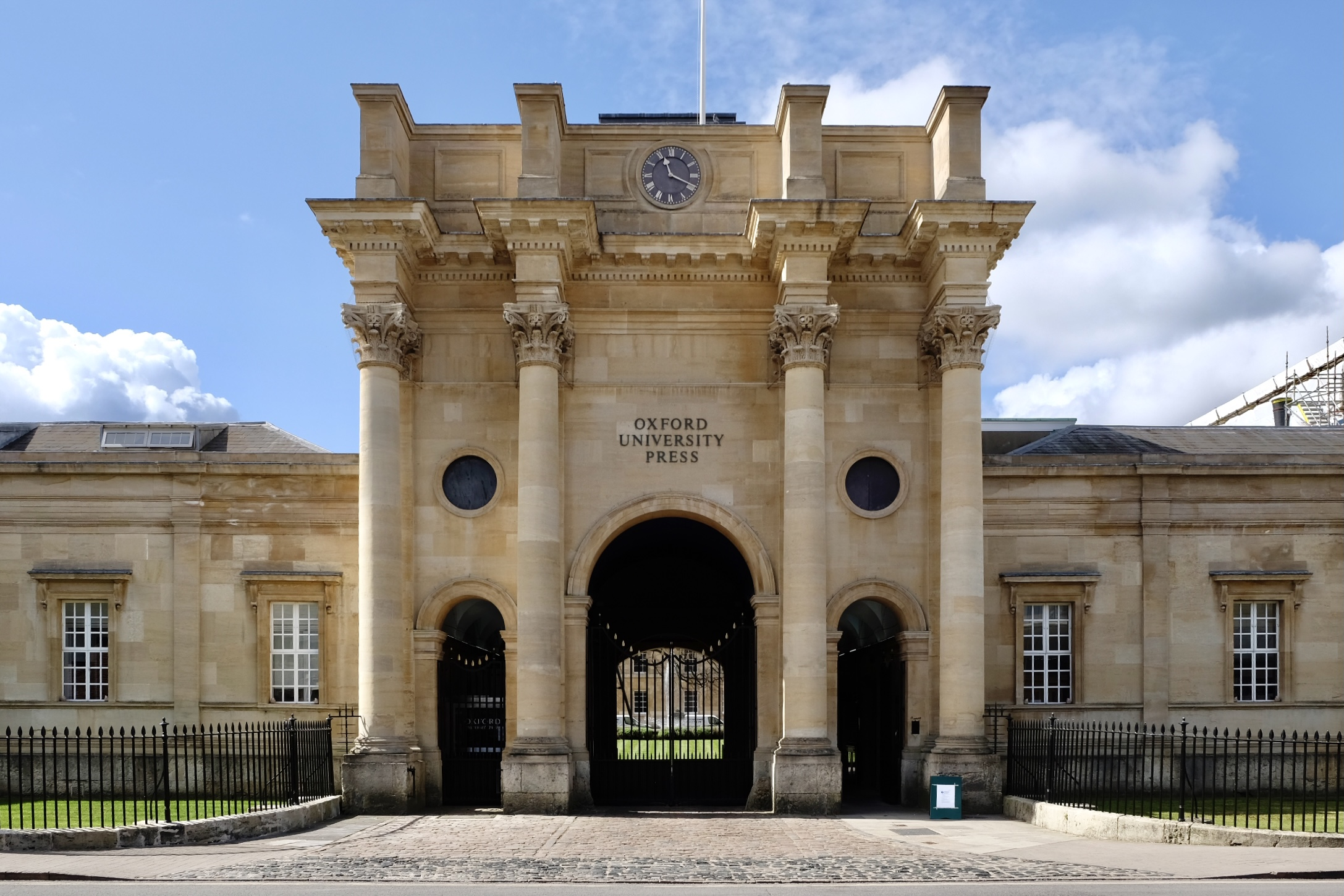
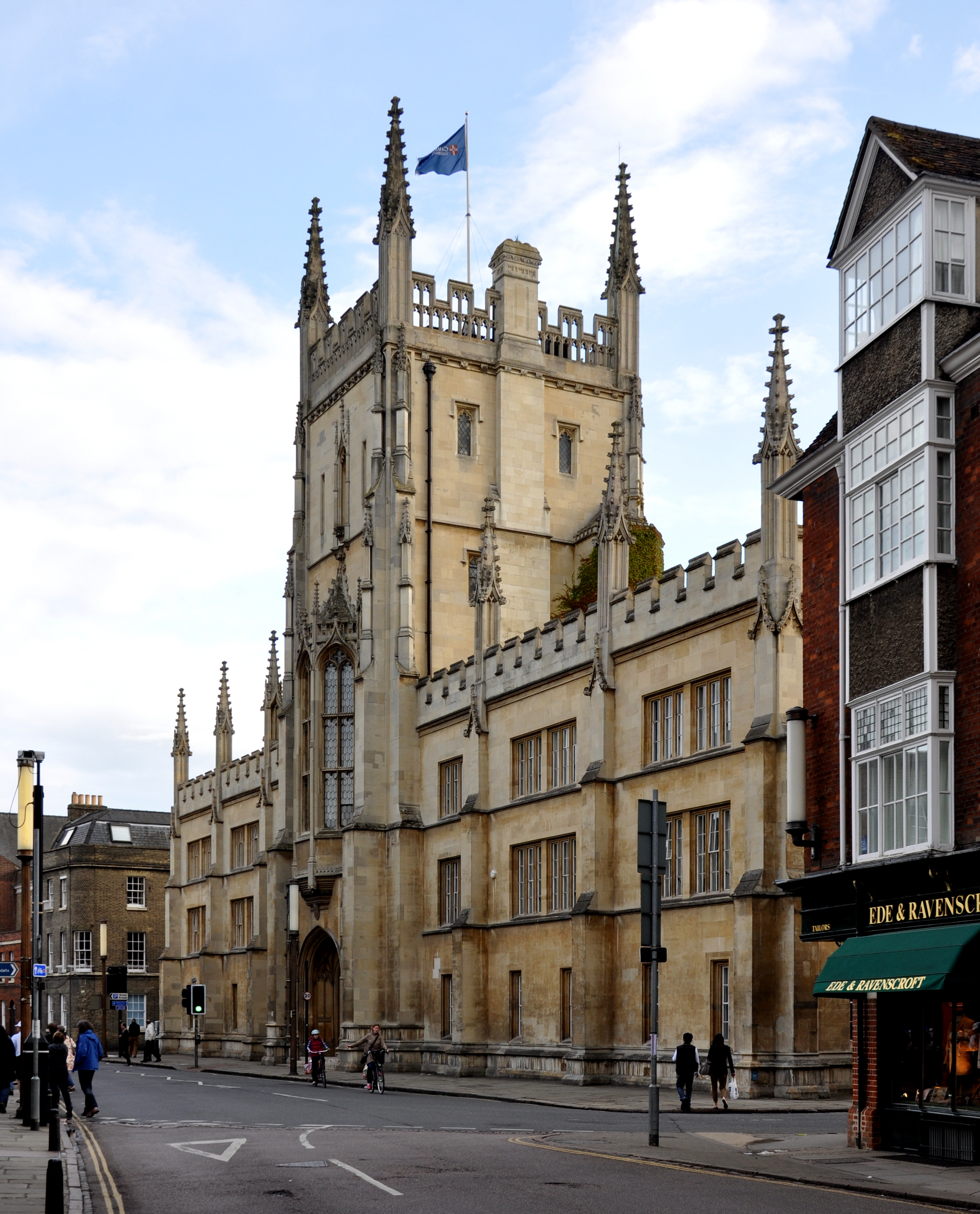
  Oxford and Cambridge University Presses
  They have established similar institutions and facilities such as publishing houses (Oxford University Press and Cambridge University Press), botanical gardens (University of Oxford Botanic Garden and Cambridge University Botanic Garden), museums (the Ashmolean Museum and the Fitzwilliam Museum), research libraries (the Bodleian Library and the Cambridge University Library), students' unions (Oxford University Student Union and the Cambridge Students' Union), debating societies (the Oxford Union and the Cambridge Union), and comedy groups (The Oxford Revue and The Cambridge Footlights).
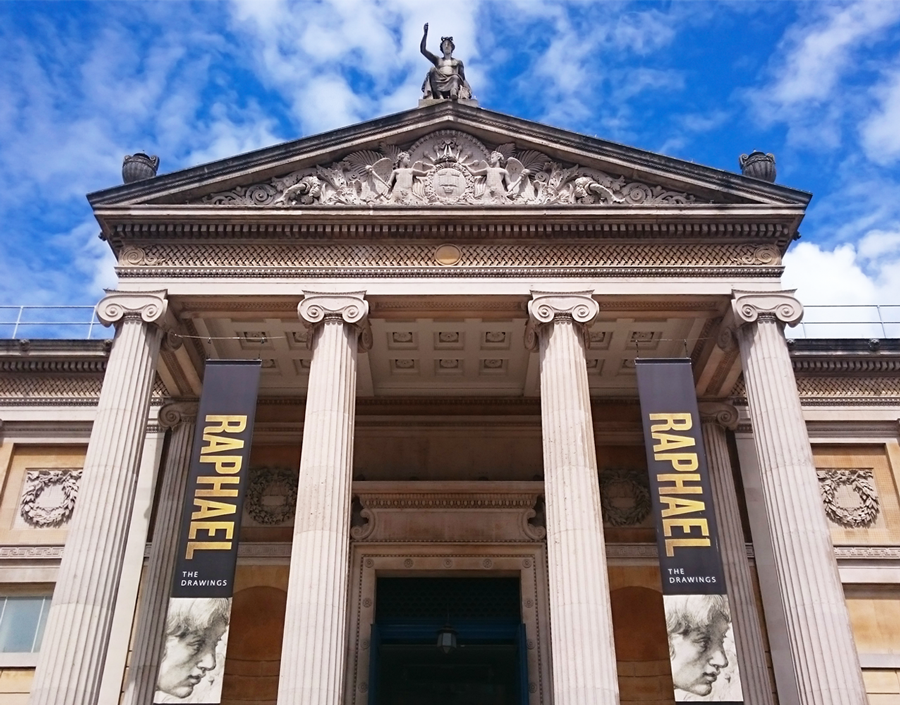
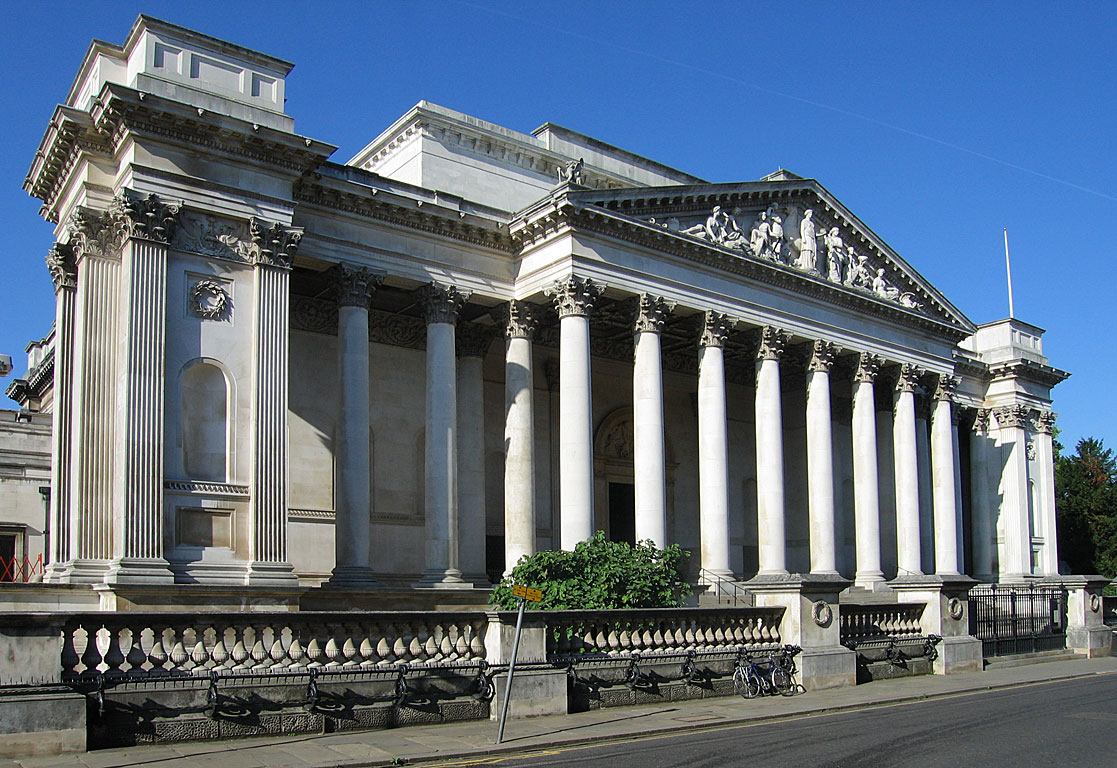
  Ashmolean and Fitzwilliam Museums
- Rivalry between Oxford and Cambridge also has a long history, dating back to around 1209, when Cambridge was founded by scholars taking refuge from hostile Oxford townsmen, and celebrated to this day in varsity matches such as The Boat Race.
- They are usually the top-scoring institutions in cross-subject UK university rankings, so they are targeted by ambitious pupils, parents and schools. Entrance is extremely competitive and some schools promote themselves based on the achievement Oxbridge offers. Combined, the two universities award over one-sixth of all English full-time research doctorates.
- Oxford and Cambridge have common approaches to undergraduate admissions. Until the mid-1980s, entry was typically by sitting special entrance exams. Applications must be made at least three months earlier than to other UK universities (the deadline for applications to Oxbridge is mid-October whereas the deadline for all other universities, apart from applicants for medicine, is in January). Additionally, candidates may not apply to both Oxford and Cambridge in the same year, apart from a few exceptions (e.g. organ scholars). Most candidates achieve, or are predicted to achieve, outstanding results in their final school exams, and consequently interviews are usually used to check whether the course is well suited to the applicant's interests and aptitudes, and to look for evidence of self-motivation, independent thinking, academic potential and ability to learn through the tutorial system.
- Membership of the Oxford and Cambridge Club is largely restricted to those who are members of the Universities of Oxford and Cambridge.

== Criticism ==
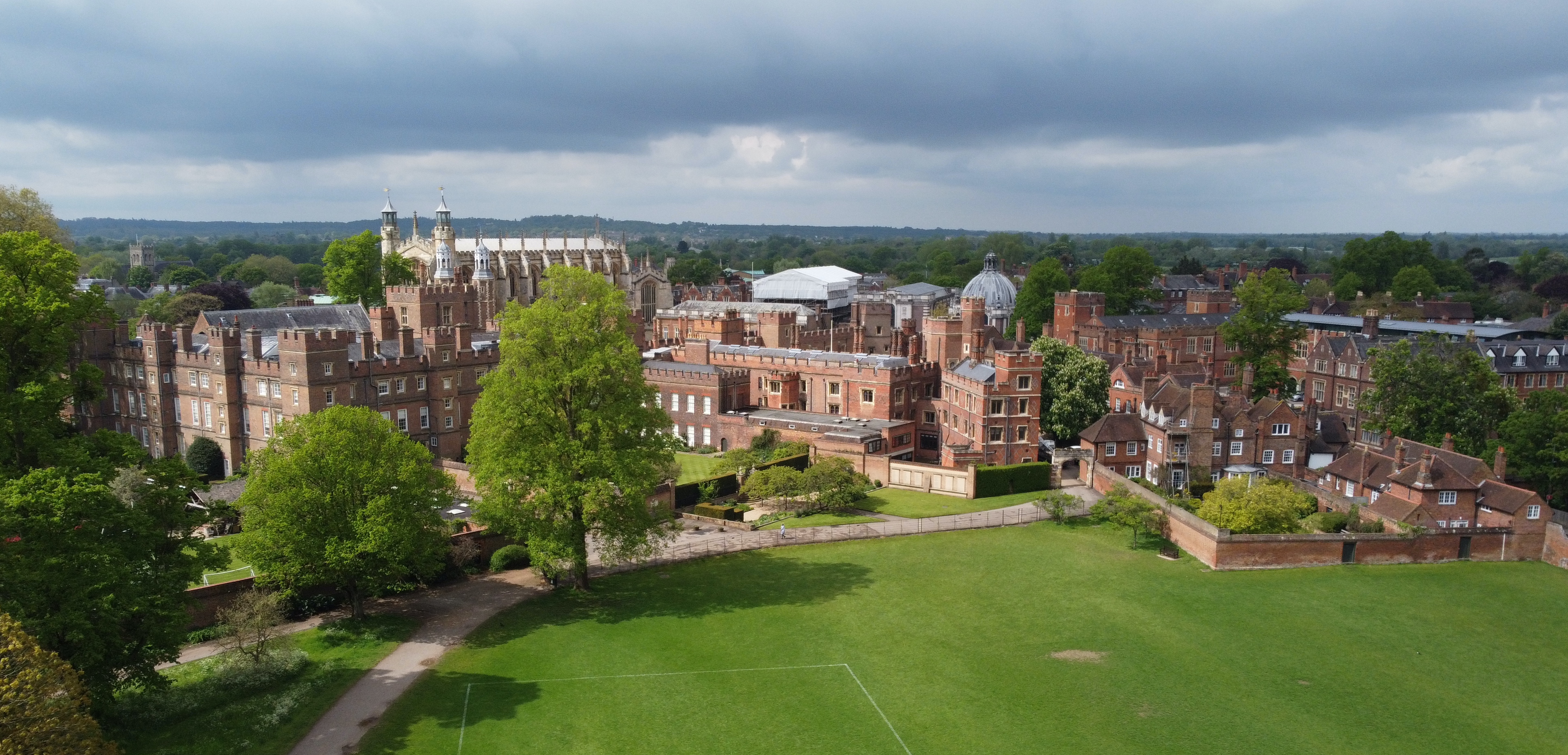
Eton College is one of several schools that send a disproportionately large percentage of its students to Oxbridge.

The word Oxbridge may also be used pejoratively: as a descriptor of social classes (referring to the professional classes who dominated the intake of both universities at the beginning of the twentieth century), as shorthand for an elite that "continues to dominate Britain's political and cultural establishment" and a parental attitude that "continues to see UK higher education through an Oxbridge prism", or to describe a "pressure-cooker" culture that attracts and then fails to support overachievers "who are vulnerable to a kind of self-inflicted stress that can all too often become unbearable" and high-flying state school students who find "coping with the workload very difficult in terms of balancing work and life" and "feel socially out of [their] depth".

The Sutton Trust maintains that the University of Oxford and the University of Cambridge "recruit" disproportionately from eight schools (Westminster School, Eton College, Hills Road Sixth Form College, St Paul's School, Peter Symonds College, St Paul's Girls' School, King's College School, and Magdalen College School). They examined published admissions data from 2015 to 2017 and found that, out of the 19,851 places during the three years, the eight schools accounted for 1,310, whereas 2,900 other schools with historically few admissions to Oxbridge accounted for 1,220.

== Related terms ==
Other portmanteaus have been coined that extend the term Oxbridge, with different degrees of recognition:

The Loxbridge term is also used referring to the golden triangle of London, Oxford, and Cambridge. It was also adopted as the name of the Ancient History conference now known as AMPAH.

Doxbridge is another example of this, referring to Durham, Oxford and Cambridge. Doxbridge was also used for an annual inter-collegiate sports tournament between some of the colleges of Durham, Oxford, Cambridge and York.

Woxbridge is the name of the annual conference between the business schools of Warwick, Oxford and Cambridge.

When the University of St Andrews topped the 2023 UK universities ranking in The Guardian, the top three institutions were labelled Stoxbridge to reflect the new order.

Thackeray's Pendennis, which introduced the term Oxbridge, also introduced Camford as another combination of the university names – "he was a Camford man and very nearly got the English Prize Poem" – but this term has never achieved the same degree of usage as Oxbridge. Camford is, however, used as the name of a fictional university city in the Sherlock Holmes story The Adventure of the Creeping Man (1923).

== See also ==
- Armorial of British universities
- Golden triangle, sometimes referred to as Loxbridge: an unofficial grouping of Oxford, Cambridge and certain elite universities in London
- Ivy League, a grouping of eight elite universities in the United States
- Oxford–Cambridge rivalry
- Russell Group, a grouping of twenty four elite universities in the United Kingdom
