= Doxbridge =

Portmanteau of Durham, Oxford, and Cambridge universities

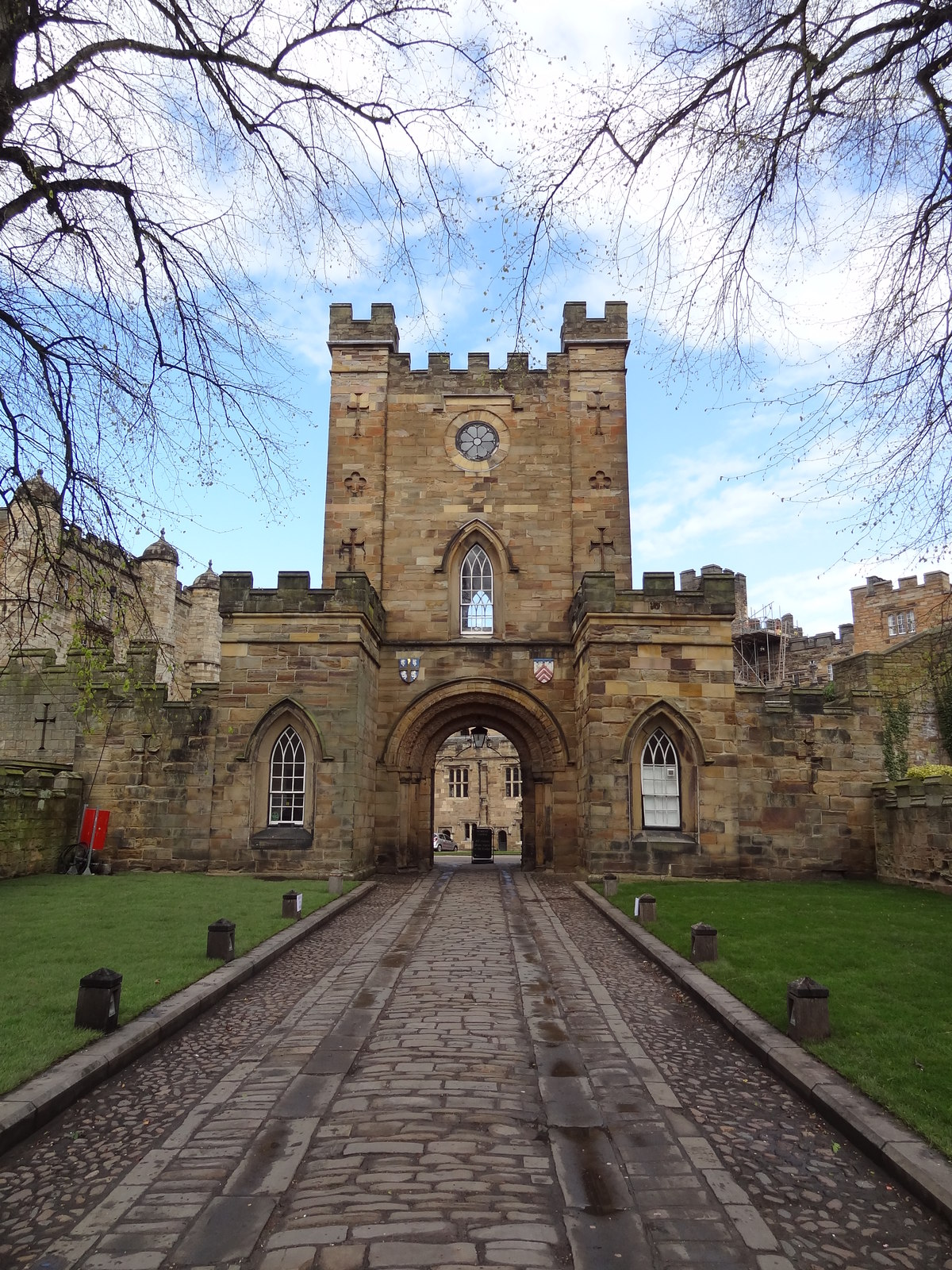
Entrance to Durham's University College (Castle)

Doxbridge is a portmanteau of Durham, Oxford, and Cambridge, referring to the universities of those names. It is an expansion of the more popular portmanteau Oxbridge, referring to Oxford and Cambridge universities and similar to the portmanteau Loxbridge, referring to London, Oxford and Cambridge.

The Doxbridge portmanteau has failed to gain widespread recognition and is usually used tongue-in-cheek. Nonetheless, many of the characteristics used to identify Oxford and Cambridge as distinct from other British universities are also identifiable to varying extents in Durham, and the term has been used seriously in analysis of the legal jobs market.

== Origin and use of the term ==
Durham University was founded in 1832, ending a period of over 600 years in which (apart from the short-lived 13th-century University of Northampton) Oxford and Cambridge were England's only recognised universities. (Note: University College London had been founded in 1826 under the name "London University" but was unable to obtain government recognition; see third oldest university in England debate) It was intended to serve as a northern complement to them, offering "that system of domestic discipline and instruction which has been found to be so efficacious in the Universities of Oxford and Cambridge".

The early university followed a model similar to the two older universities in its links to the Church of England, in its collegiate structure and in its BA course. Examiners were brought in from Oxford University to help with setting and marking exams and to ensure that comparable standards were maintained – the origin of the external examiner system which is now standard across all UK universities. However, it broke from Oxbridge in having professorial teaching by university professors rather than tutorials given by college tutors (professorial teaching would not be revived at Oxbridge until later in the 19th century), in pioneering the university teaching of theology and of engineering, and in the use of university matriculation examinations. Durham was rebuffed in its attempts in the first couple of decades of its existence to have its degrees recognised in the mutual ad eundem system which existed between Oxford, Cambridge and Trinity College Dublin, whereby holders of a degree in one institution could be admitted to the same degree in the others.

George Edwin MacLean, in his 1917 report "Studies in Higher Education in England and Scotland" for the United States Department of the Interior, produced one of the first groupings of UK universities, and grouped Durham with Oxford and Cambridge. He wrote,

Several Englishmen have been surprised that Durham should be grouped with Oxford and Cambridge, rather than with the newer English universities, since it was founded in 1832. In fact, in its Durham division (Note: From 1909 the university comprised two divisions, Durham and Newcastle. In 1963, the Newcastle division - described by MacLean as "an inchoate newer university, anticipating all the other new universities" - became the University of Newcastle upon Tyne, while the Durham division continued as the University of Durham.) it is an inchoate Oxford or Cambridge, the third of the ancient universities in England, brought forth after an interval of 700 years as one born out of due time.

The three institutions share, or are claimed to share, various characteristics used to justify the addition of Durham to Oxbridge to form Doxbridge:

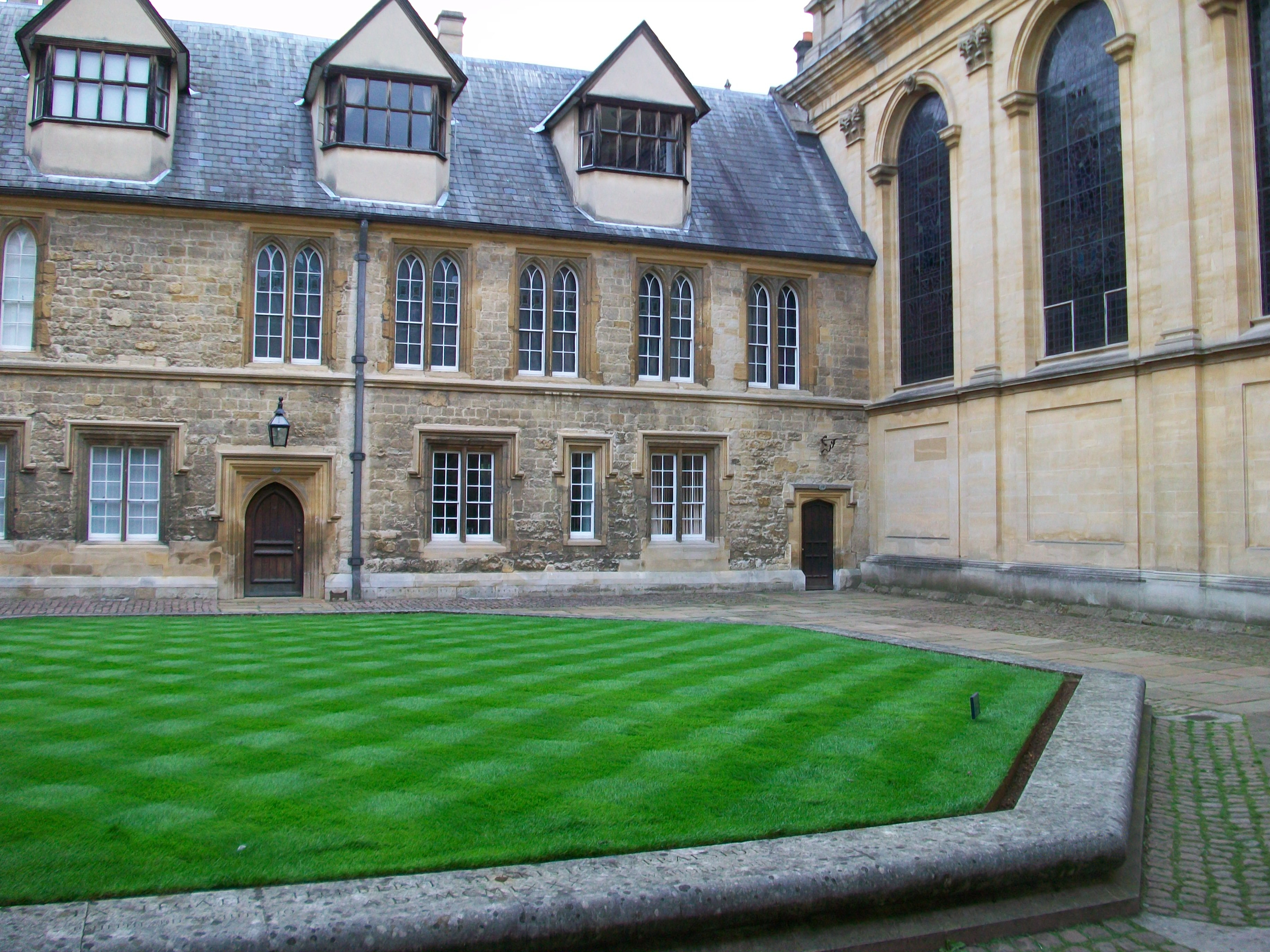
Surviving buildings of Durham College, Oxford, now the Durham Quadrangle of Trinity College

- They are the three oldest universities in England. – Durham University was founded in 1832, following two earlier attempts under Henry VIII in 1541 and Oliver Cromwell in 1657, and three Oxford colleges were founded from Durham: University College, Balliol College and Durham College. The last of these was run directly from Durham Cathedral and was suppressed at the reformation, its revenues being passed to the cathedral (while its buildings were used to found Trinity College, Oxford), leading to claims that Durham University was the legitimate successor to the college.
- All three are collegiate universities, where the collegiate system is a key aspect of the university experience. – Ted Tapper and David Palfreyman of the Oxford Centre for Higher Education Policy Studies write that "Oxford and Cambridge continue to be the two English universities that offer the best examples of the collegiate model of the university but there is some substance in Durham's claim that it also belongs to that club".
- All three are academically excellent, with a "proud and distinguished history of high achieving and high performing". – In the 2020 Complete University Guide subject rankings, Durham, Oxford, and Cambridge collectively represent three of the four universities (along with Imperial College London) to have over 90 per cent of their subjects ranked in the top 10 in this ranking.
- All three have distinguished alumni.
- They are the three most represented universities in trainee cohorts for the "Magic Circle" and other large law firms.
- All three have high fractions of their student body drawn from fee-charging schools.

Against this it has been argued that:

- Durham has its own identity and is different in character to Oxbridge.
- Durham is not as academically intense as Oxbridge, leaving more time for clubs and societies and other non-academic activities.
- Durham is no better represented among partners at major law firms or in barristers' chambers than other top Russell Group universities.
- Durham does not have teaching in the colleges, apart from at Cranmer Hall.

=== Sport ===
The Doxbridge Tournament is the name of an unofficial inter-collegiate sports competition, held annually in Dublin. This was founded in 1998 and was originally contested by colleges from Oxford, Cambridge and Durham, later expanding to include colleges of the University of York.

The Doxbridge Cup is a golf tournament held between teams from Oxford, Cambridge and Durham since 2008 as a prelude to the Varsity Match.

== See also ==
- Golden Triangle — informal grouping of universities in London and southeast England, sometimes called Loxbridge
- Russell Group — formal grouping of 24 leading public research universities in the UK
- Third-oldest university in England debate
