= Global Medical Excellence Cluster =

Global Medical Excellence Cluster (GMEC) describes the business cluster model formed by premier UK academic institutions with medical centres in biomedical and related technologies and patient care with a view of forging resources and strengths towards medical innovation and healthcare improvement research. Currently, GMEC represents the largest life science bio-cluster in the world.

GMEC was founded by five universities, namely: University of Cambridge, University College London, Imperial College London, King's College London and University of Oxford. It was then joined by Queen Mary University of London in 2012.

GMEC is the UK's answer to the biomedical clusters that is trending in the US, Europe and Asia, where academia and industry collaborate to deliver medical innovation and generate economic value.

== Gallery ==
Global Medical Excellence Cluster Universities
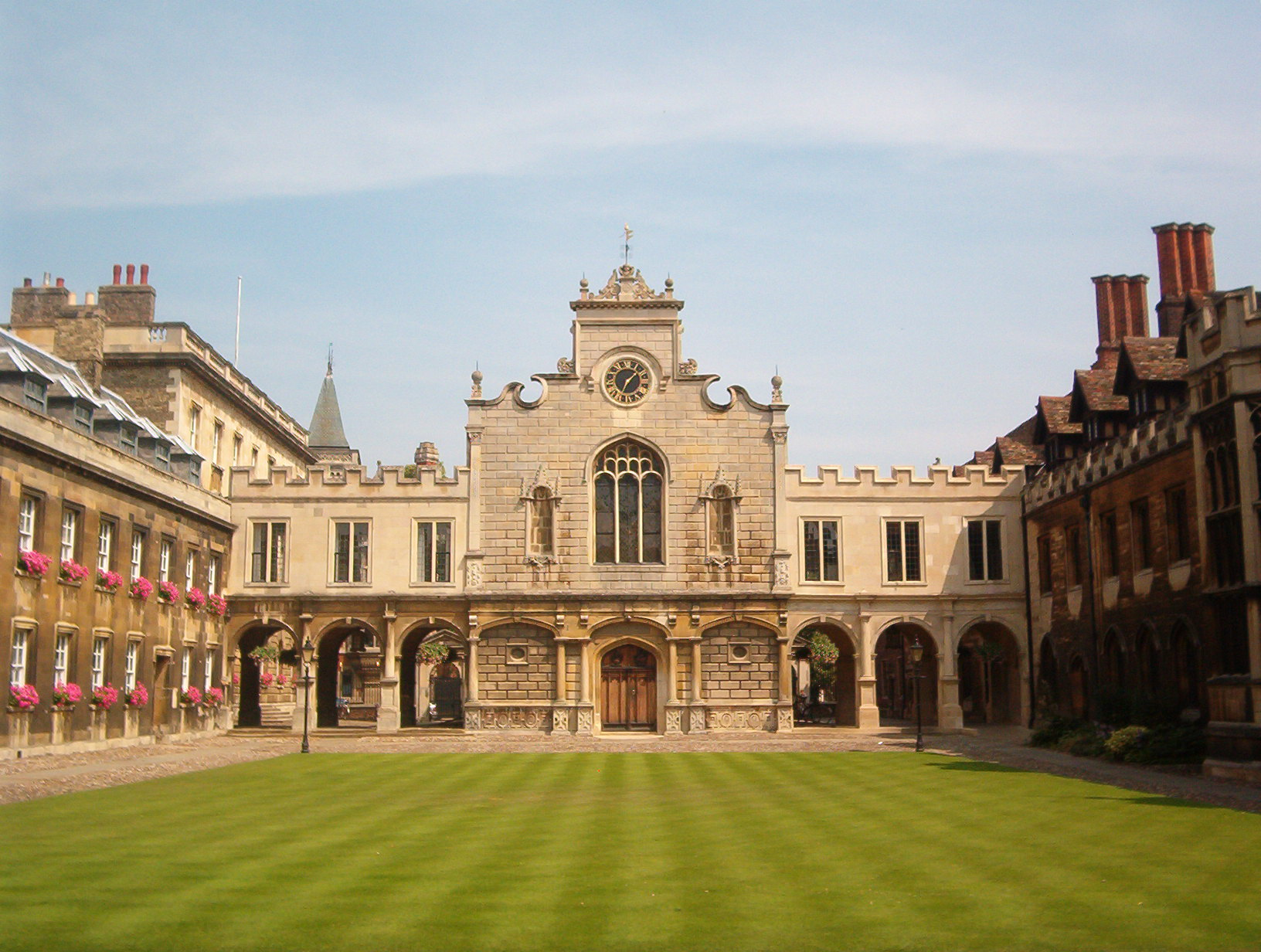
University of Cambridge
(Peterhouse)

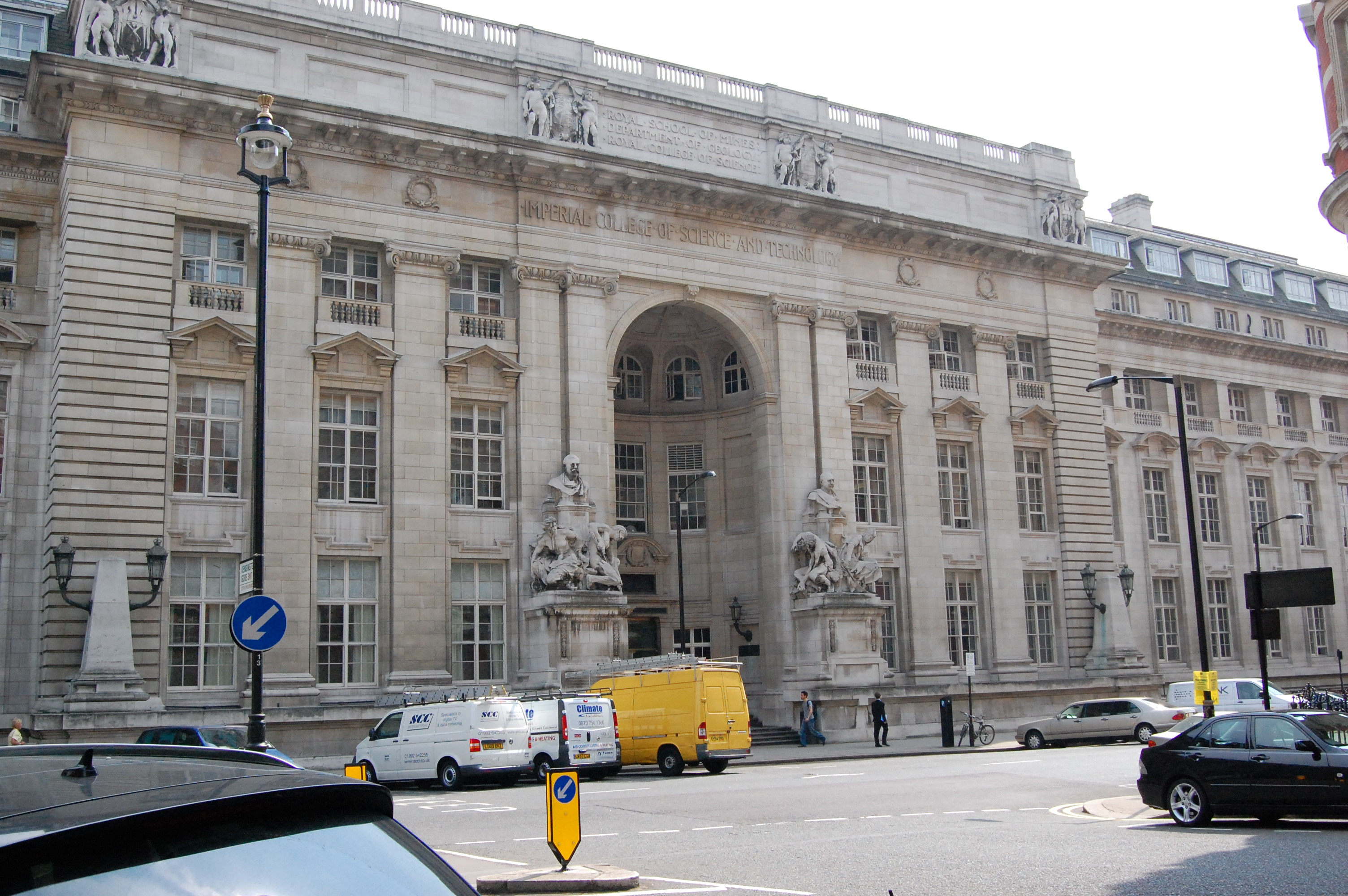
Imperial College London
(Royal School of Mines)

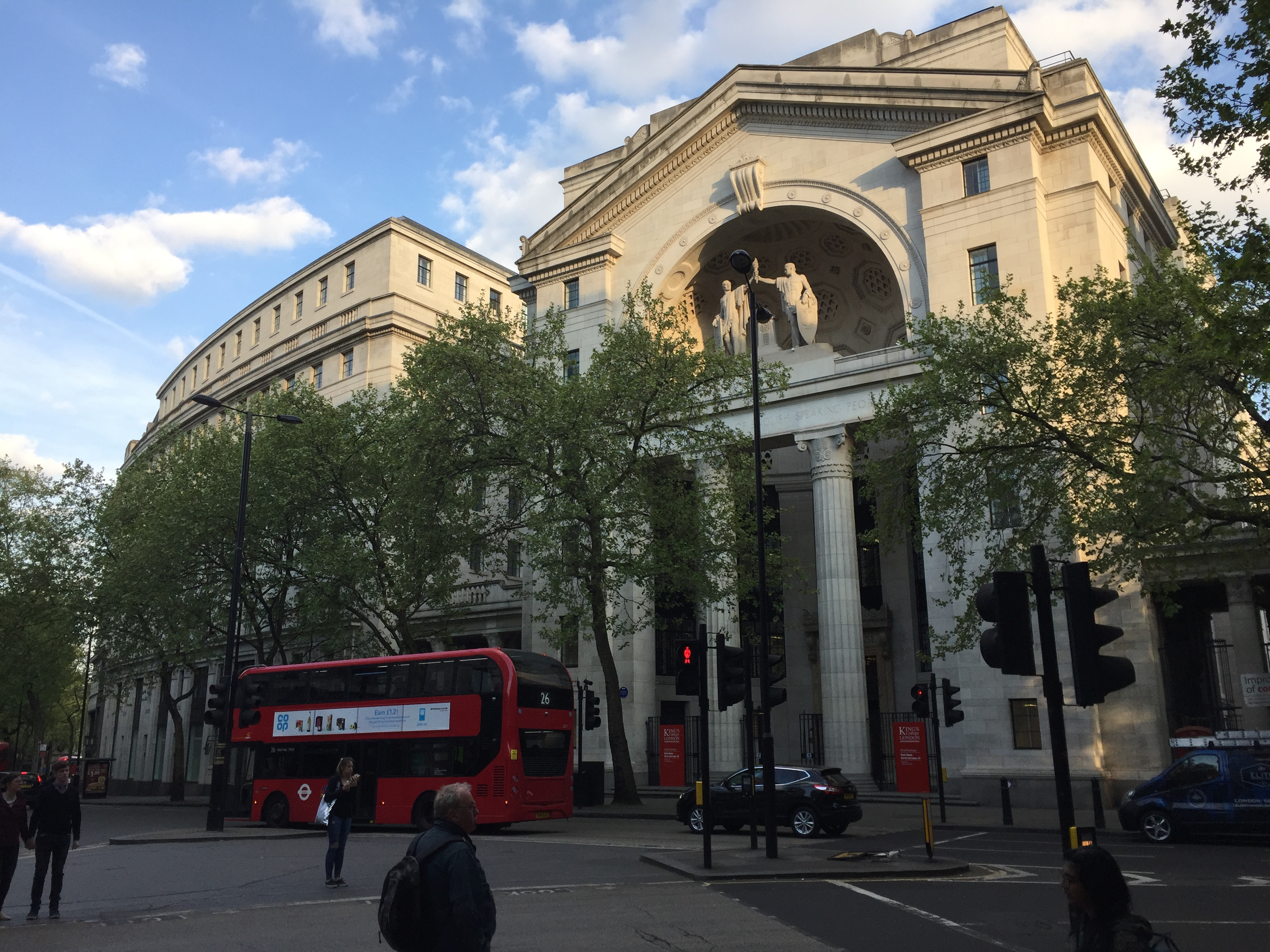
King's College London
(Bush House)

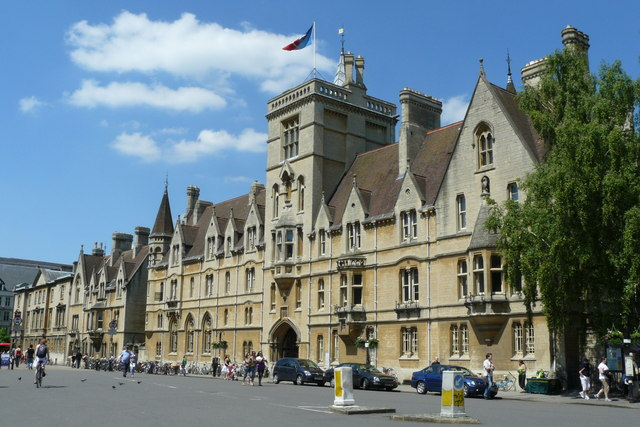
University of Oxford
(Balliol College)

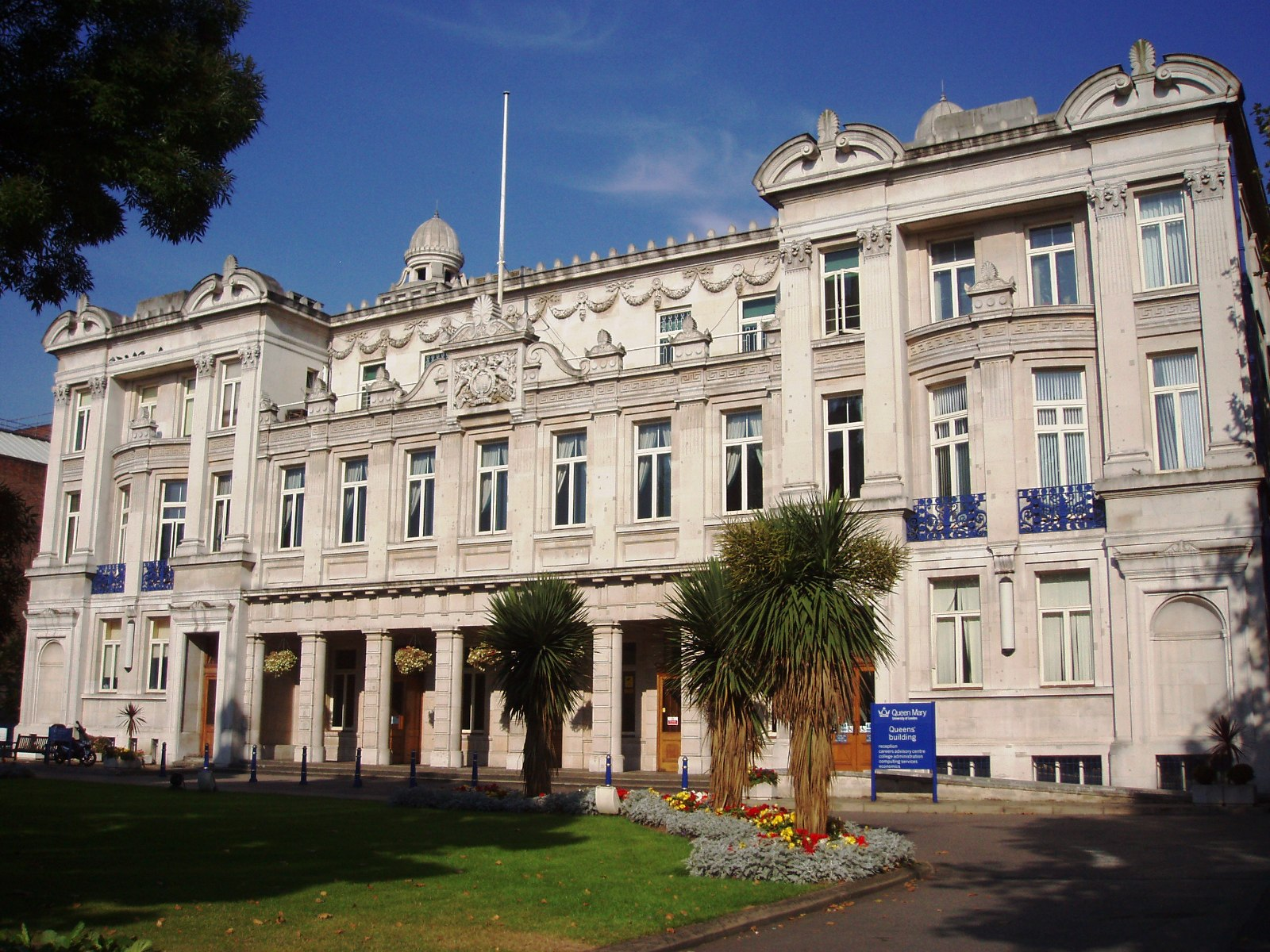
Queen Mary University of London
(The Queens' Building)

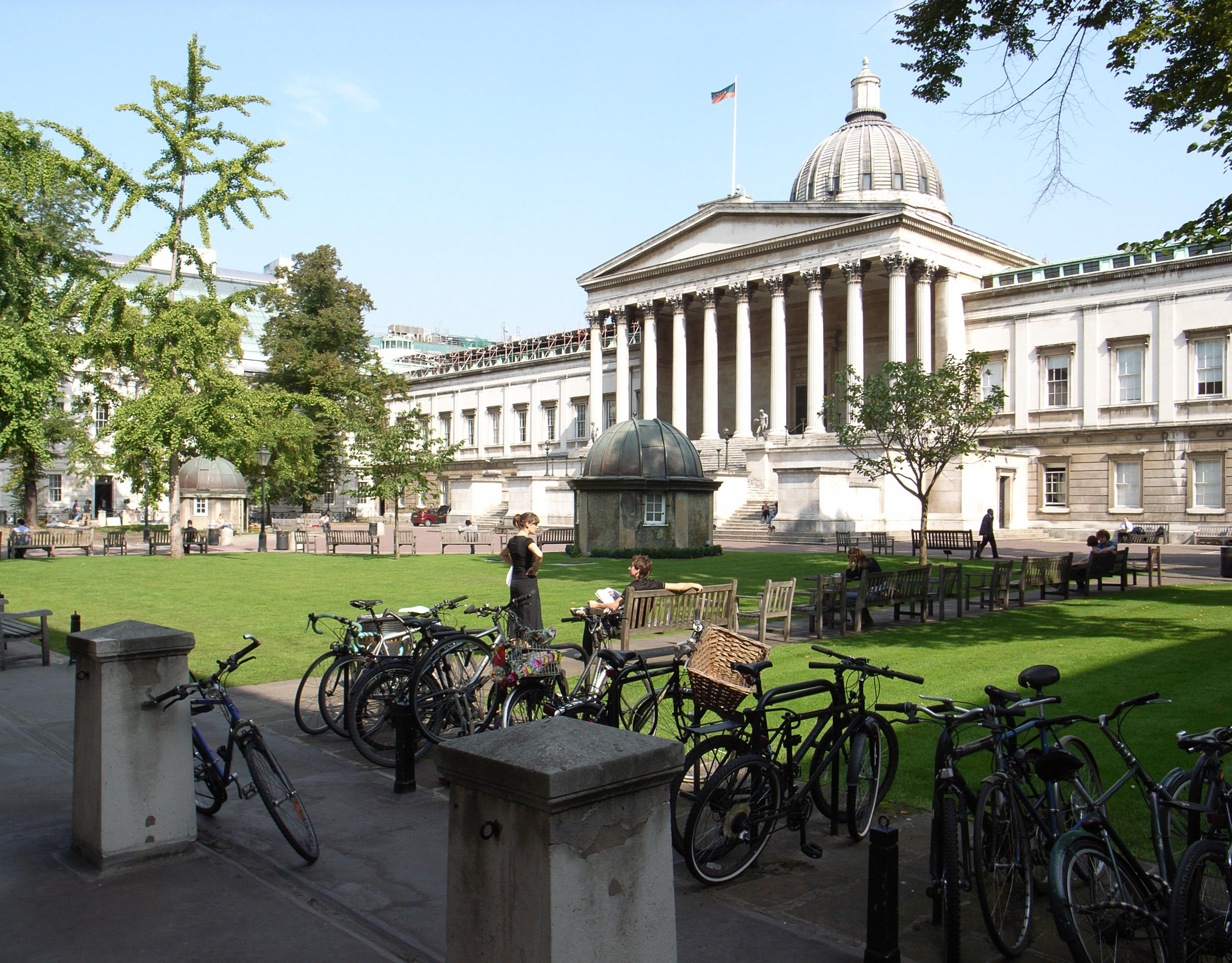
University College London
(Wilkins Building)

== See also ==
- Golden triangle (universities)
- MedCity (London)
- University of Cambridge
- University College London
- Imperial College London
- King's College London
- University of Oxford
