= Golden triangle (universities) =

Unofficial grouping of universities in England

The university cities in the south east of England which form the 'golden triangle'.

The golden triangle is the triangle formed by the university cities of Cambridge, London, and Oxford in the south east of England in the United Kingdom. (Note: Multiple sources state the golden triangle is formed around Oxford, Cambridge and London.) The triangle is occasionally referred to as the Loxbridge triangle, a portmanteau of London and Oxbridge or, when described as including five institutions, the G5.

The list of universities considered to be members of the golden triangle varies between sources, but typically comprises the University of Cambridge, the University of Oxford, Imperial College London, King's College London, the London School of Economics and University College London. (Note: Multiple sources confirm the membership, although some omit either King's or LSE, as noted under their entries.) Some sources omit either or both of King's College London (Note: King's College London is not included by) and the London School of Economics; (Note: LSE is not included by) while occasionally other universities are included, e.g. the London Business School and the London School of Hygiene and Tropical Medicine, or all of the higher education institutions in the three cities.

== Members ==
The universities typically considered members of the golden triangle are amongst the longest established universities in England and possess some of the largest financial endowments across the United Kingdom. Total enrolments for the 2024/25 academic year range from about 12,900 at LSE to 51,400 at UCL, with UCL being the second-largest university in the United Kingdom by total enrolment.

Institution	Est.	Undergr.	Postgr.	Endow.	Ac. Staff	Motto
University of Cambridge	1209	13,345	9,220	£7.134^{†} (Note: Colleges £4,665M, University (Group) £2,469.1M)	6,180	Hinc lucem et pocula sacra (From this place, we gain enlightenment and precious knowledge)
Imperial College London	1907	12,080	10,440	£0.235	4,730	Scientia imperii decus et tutamen (Knowledge is the adornment and protection of the Empire)
King's College London	1829	23,200	17,670	£0.325	6,355	Sancte et Sapienter (With Holiness and Wisdom)
London School of Economics	1895	5,785	7,160	£0.256	1,935	Rerum cognoscere causas (To Know the Causes of Things)
University of Oxford	1096	14,355	11,865	£8.708 (Note: Colleges (group) £6,795.6M, University (consolidated) £1,912.4M)	8,005	Dominus Illuminatio Mea (The Lord is my Light)
University College London	1826	25,705	25,610	£0.175	10,400	Cuncti adsint meritaeque expectent praemia palmae (Let all come who by merit deserve the most reward)

Notes:
^{†} Only 2022/23 endowment figures available for Cambridge

== Research income ==
With the exception of the LSE, the five other institutions typically considered members of the golden triangle have among the highest research incomes of all British universities, ranking in the top seven of British universities by research grant and contract income (along with Manchester and Edinburgh) and in the top six of English universities by Research England recurrent funding (along with Manchester). These five institutions all have significant fractions of their research grant and contract income from clinical medicine, varying (in 2021/22) from 41.7% (Cambridge) to 63.6% (King's College London), compared to an average across the UK of 34.4%. Overall, 50.9% of the 2020/21 research grant and contract income of the five institutions (50.0% if the LSE is included) came from clinical medicine research, and they accounted for 34.7% of all research grant and contract income of UK universities in 2020/21 (35.2% if the LSE is included). Each university receives millions of pounds in research fundings and other grants from the UK government, criticised by leaders of some other universities as disproportionate and not in the best interests of the country as a whole. In 2013/14, universities in Oxford, Cambridge and London received 46% of research funding in the UK, up from 42.6% a decade earlier.

Following the 2021 Research Excellence Framework (REF), the golden triangle universities saw a fall in their share of Quality Research funding (recurring funding based on the REF results rather than grants or other sources) from Research England. Analysis by Times Higher Education showed that the share of funding going to the golden triangle (not including the LSE in this analysis) fell from 35.36 per cent in 2020/21 under the previous REF to 33.05 per cent in 2021/22, although the actual funding the institutions received increased due to an overall increase in funding levels and the five universities remained (with Manchester) the top six institutions by share of funding. The LSE saw a decrease in actual funding of 9.03 per cent, leading to a 0.28 percentage point fall in its share of funding to 0.85 per cent, placing it below the post-92 Northumbria University.

In 2004, the G5 universities consisting of Cambridge, Imperial, LSE, Oxford and UCL were accused of secretly coordinating bids for an increased share of any extra money made available in the government's summer 2004 spending review. The objective was to secure extra state funding above the £3,000 student top-up fees planned in England from 2006 to cover the full costs of home and European Union undergraduates on their courses. This has been attributed to the universities stating they are offering no cheap courses, and that they would have to reduce their intake of UK students without the additional income.

The balance of funding between the 'golden triangle' and the rest of the UK has been questioned, and was specifically included in the terms of reference for an enquiry in 2018 by the House of Commons Science and Technology Select Committee. According to defenders of the level of funding going to the golden triangle institutions, "The apparent concentration of research in the golden triangle is little more than a reflection of the distribution of people in the UK". Analysis of grant proposals to Research Councils UK between 2012–13 and 2016–17 has shown that golden triangle institutions do not have unusually high success rates (two are actually below the expected range), but that the northern universities of Durham, Lancaster and York do. In February 2022, the UK Government announced as part of its "Levelling Up" white paper that public investment outside of the south east would increase by 40% by 2030, despite warnings from leaders of research-intensive universities that this could reduce the importance of scientific excellence in funding decisions. A report by the Higher Education Policy Institute in 2024 found that research quality was no higher in the golden triangle than elsewhere, concluding that the higher funding levels in the golden triangle "may reflect a retained and somewhat toxic historical and cultural bias towards particular institutions", with lower levels of research activity outside of the southeast reflecting lower levels of investment.

Recurrent Quality Research funding from Research England for golden triangle universities (out of English universities, year 2022/23)
Rank	University	QR funding (£m)	QR funding share (%)
1	University of Oxford	164.2	8.32
2	University College London	159.2	8.06
3	University of Cambridge	141.5	7.78
4	Imperial College London	106.5	5.45
6	King's College London	81.2	4.11
31	London School of Economics	16.8	0.85

Research grant and contract income (excluding recurring Quality Research funding from funding councils) for golden triangle universities (out of British universities, year 2020/21)
Rank	University	Research income			
Rank	University	Total (£m)	Clinical medicine		Total as proportion of total income (%)
Rank	University	Total (£m)	(£m)	As proportion of total research income (%)	Total as proportion of total income (%)
1	University of Oxford	653.3	363.5	55.6%	26.9%
2	University of Cambridge	588.6	245.4	41.7%	27.0%
3	University College London	476.9	256.9	53.9%	29.6%
4	Imperial College London	363.0	169.8	46.8%	33.6%
7	King's College London	187.9	119.5	63.6%	18.8%
41	London School of Economics	34.9	0.0	0.0%	8.8%

== Academic profiles ==
=== Admissions ===
UCAS Admissions Statistics (2025)
University	Applications	Offer Rate (%)	Accepted	Average Entry Tariff (2022)	
University	Applications	Offer Rate (%)	Accepted	Overall	Top 3 exams (Note: The maximum tariff score for three exams is 168: the equivalent of A*A*A* at A-Level, 777 at HL for the IB Diploma Programme, or AAA at Advanced Higher)
Cambridge	23,105	21.4%	3,670	206	166 (A*A*A*)
Imperial	33,350	25.3%	3,495	202	164 (A*A*A–A*A*A*)
King's	75,835	50.5%	8,375	168	151 (A*AA)
LSE	29,425	15.8%	2,060	187	161 (A*A*A)
Oxford	24,400	16.1%	3,340	203	165 (A*A*A*)
UCL	89,680	44.2%	11,470	173	158 (A*A*A)

All six universities are consistently designated as 'high-tariff' institutions by the Department for Education, with the average undergraduate entrant to the universities in 2022 amassing between 151–166 UCAS Tariff points in their top three pre-university qualifications – the equivalent of A*AA to A*A*A* at A-Level. With the exception of King's, the remaining members placed within the top eight in the country by this metric (the others being 4th-placed St Andrews, 6th-placed Edinburgh and 7th-placed Durham). Based on 2022/23 HESA entry standards data published in domestic league tables, which include a broad range of qualifications beyond the top three exam grades, the average student at the six institutions amassed between 168–206 points.

For the 2022 undergraduate admissions cycle, the universities made up six of the eight British universities by lowest offer rates (the others being 4th-placed St Andrews and 7th-placed Edinburgh). All of the universities reported offer rates, including conditional and unconditional offers, below 40 per cent.

=== Rankings and reputation ===
Golden triangle universities generally do well on international rankings, which strongly reflect research performance. Some global rankings, such as those produced by Times Higher Education (THE) and QS, correct for the sizes of institutions in calculating their results but others, such as the Academic Ranking of World Universities (ARWU), make no such adjustment. The golden triangle universities generally do well on British university league tables, with Cambridge, Imperial, the LSE and Oxford ranked in the top five by all compilers in the 2027 tables. King's College London and UCL, however, are ranked outside of the top ten in all of the major rankings.

University	ARWU 2025 (Global)	QS 2027 (Global)	THE 2026 (Global)	Complete 2027 (National)	Guardian 2026 (National)	Times/Sunday Times 2027 (National)
University of Cambridge	4	6	3=	1	2	4
Imperial College London	26	2	8	5	5	3
King's College London	61	37	38	16	19	29
London School of Economics	151–200	62	52	3	3	2
University of Oxford	6	4	1	2	1	5
University College London	14	8=	22	13=	13	14

== Student demographics ==
=== Social class ===
Students from private education are over-represented at the six institutions. With the exception of King's, the remaining universities reported over 30% of their UK-domiciled student body in 2020-21 composed of private school students. This places the universities among the nine highest UK providers with more than 10,000 students for the proportion of private school students with Imperial in 5th at 32.4% (behind Durham, St Andrews, Edinburgh and Exeter) followed by UCL (32.4%), Oxford (31.4%), LSE (30.4%) and Cambridge (30.0%). Nationally, around 6% of school-aged pupils attend education in the private sector, although this figure increases to 18% for pupils aged 16–19 in England.

=== Domicile and ethnic background ===
In the 2024–25 academic year, 176,450 students were enrolled at the six institutions: 96,960 were from the United Kingdom (55%), 12,285 from the European Union (7%) and 67,175 were from overseas countries outside of the European Union (38.1%).

Among mainstream British higher education institutions, the LSE had the highest proportion of non-UK students in 2024–25 at 63.5% (followed by Hertfordshire and University of the Arts London), Imperial at fourth at 52.9% and UCL in fifth at 51.9%.

Domicile and ethnic background (2024/25)
University	British White (Note: Not to be confused with solely White British)	British Asian	Black British	British Mixed Heritage	Other/ not known	International	
University	British White	British Asian	Black British	British Mixed Heritage	Other/ not known	EU	Non-EU
Cambridge	44.1%	12.2%	2.8%	5.6%	3.2%	6.3%	25.9%
Imperial	19.2%	18.2%	2.7%	3.7%	3.3%	8.7%	44.2%
King's	26.5%	19.1%	6.8%	4.5%	4.8%	5.8%	32.6%
LSE	15.2%	12.1%	2.5%	3.4%	3.4%	13.6%	50.0%
Oxford	44.6%	8.3%	2.2%	4.7%	3%	7.7%	29.5%
UCL	22.5%	14.5%	3.6%	4%	3.5%	5.3%	46.5%
England	81.0%	9.6%	4.2%	3.0%	2.2%	—N/a	—N/a
England	82.6%					6.3%	11.1%

== Gallery ==
Golden Triangle (Universities)
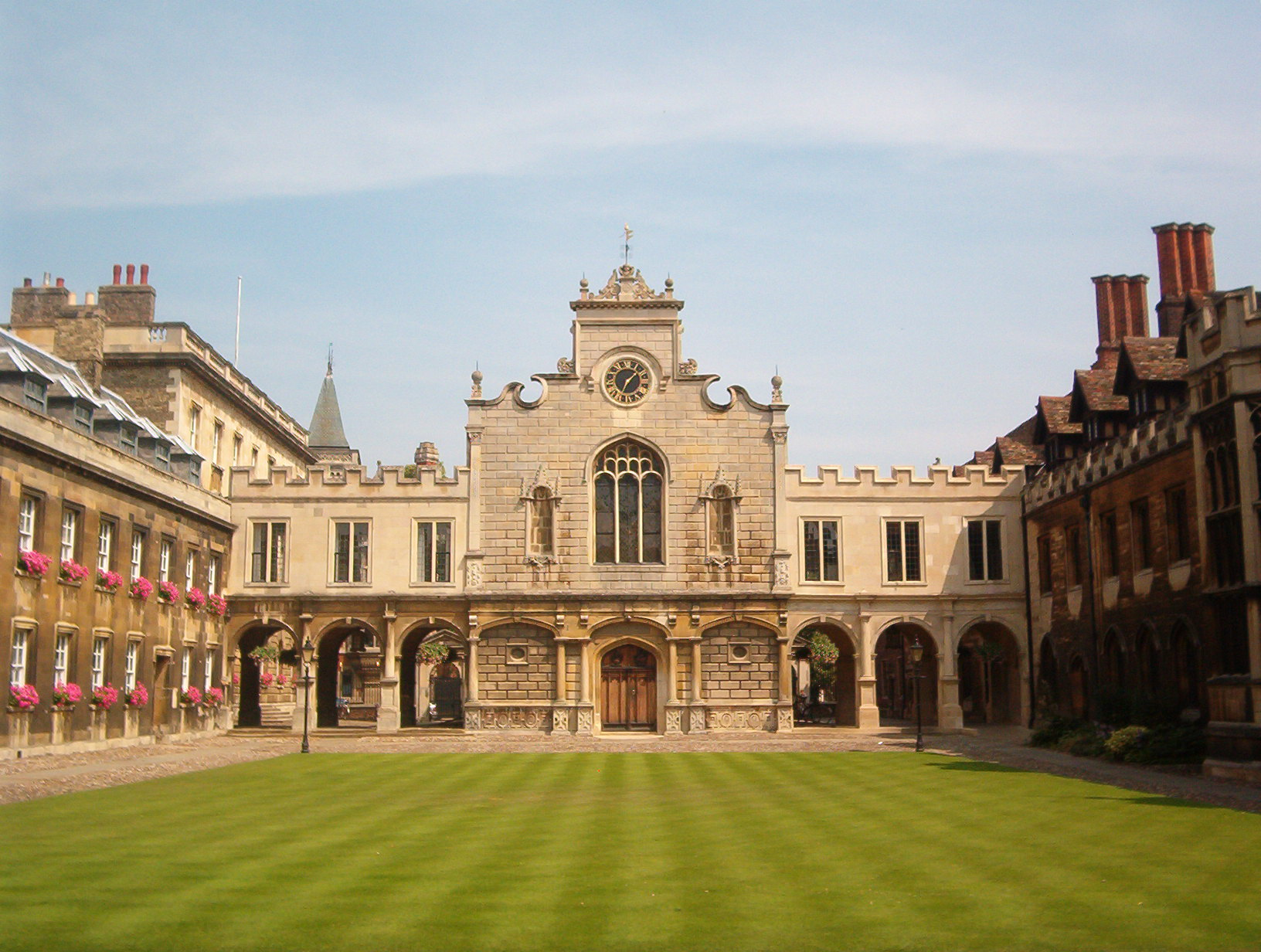
University of Cambridge
(Peterhouse)

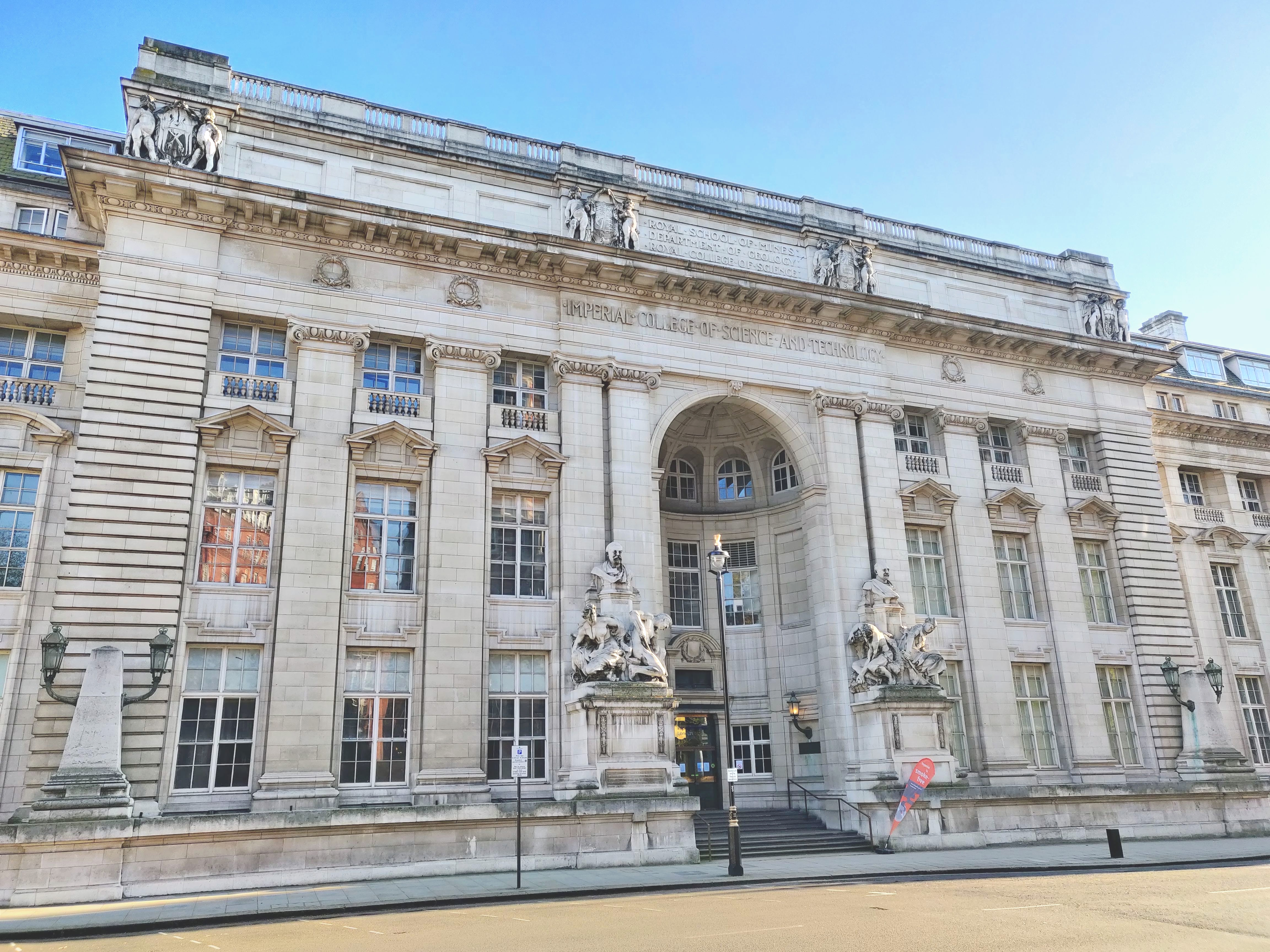
Imperial College London
(Royal School of Mines)

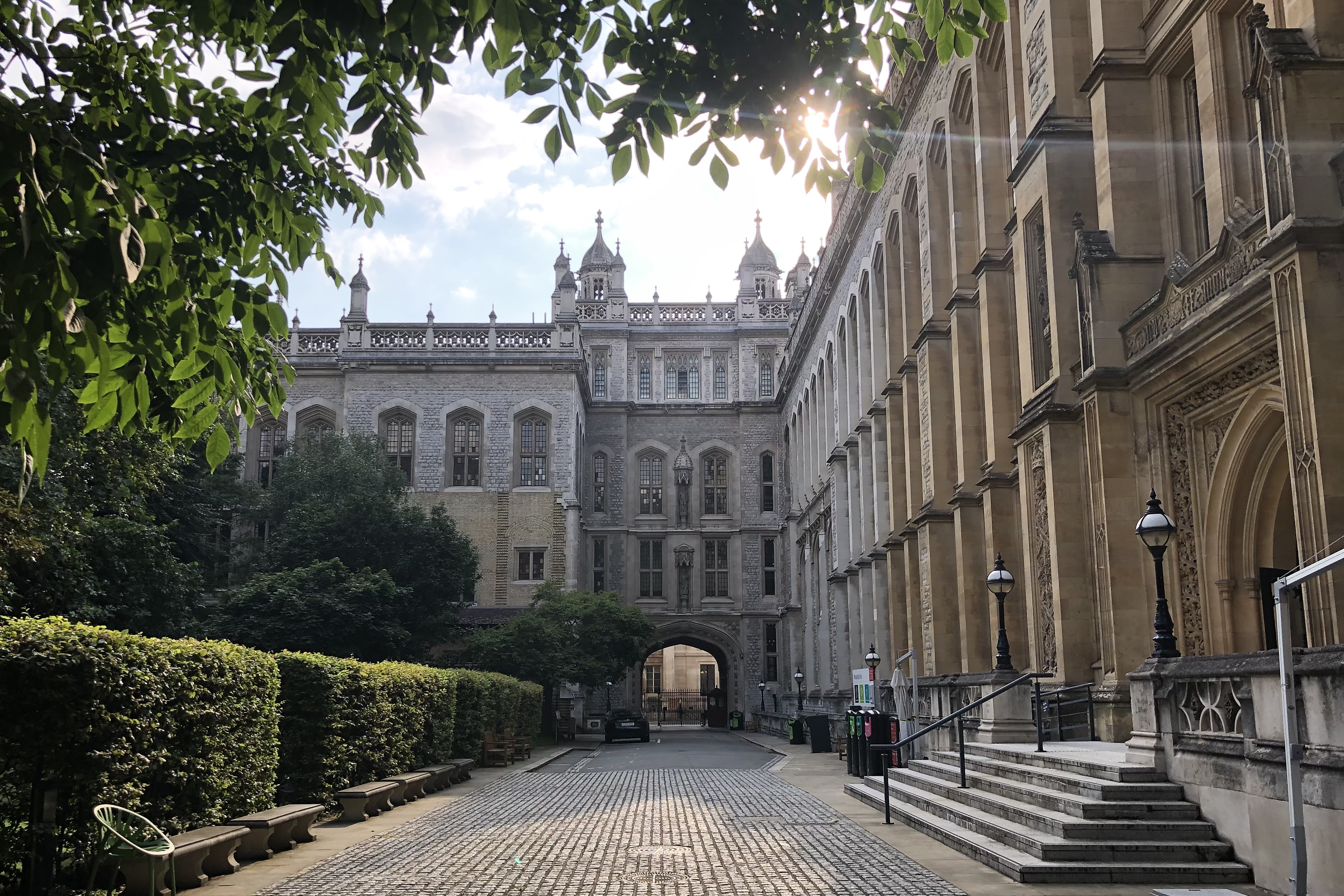
King's College London
(Maughan Library)

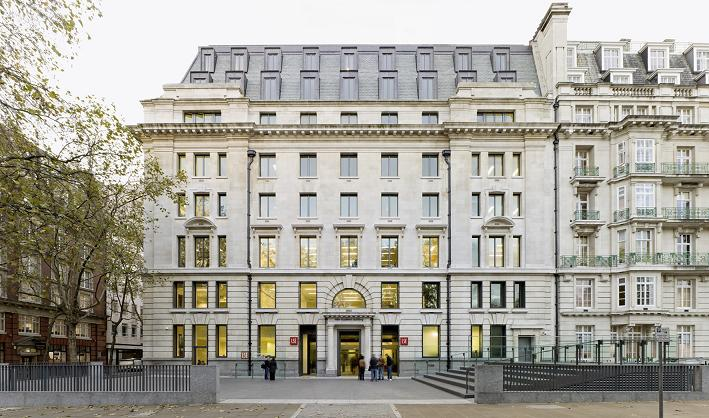
London School of Economics
(New Academic Building)

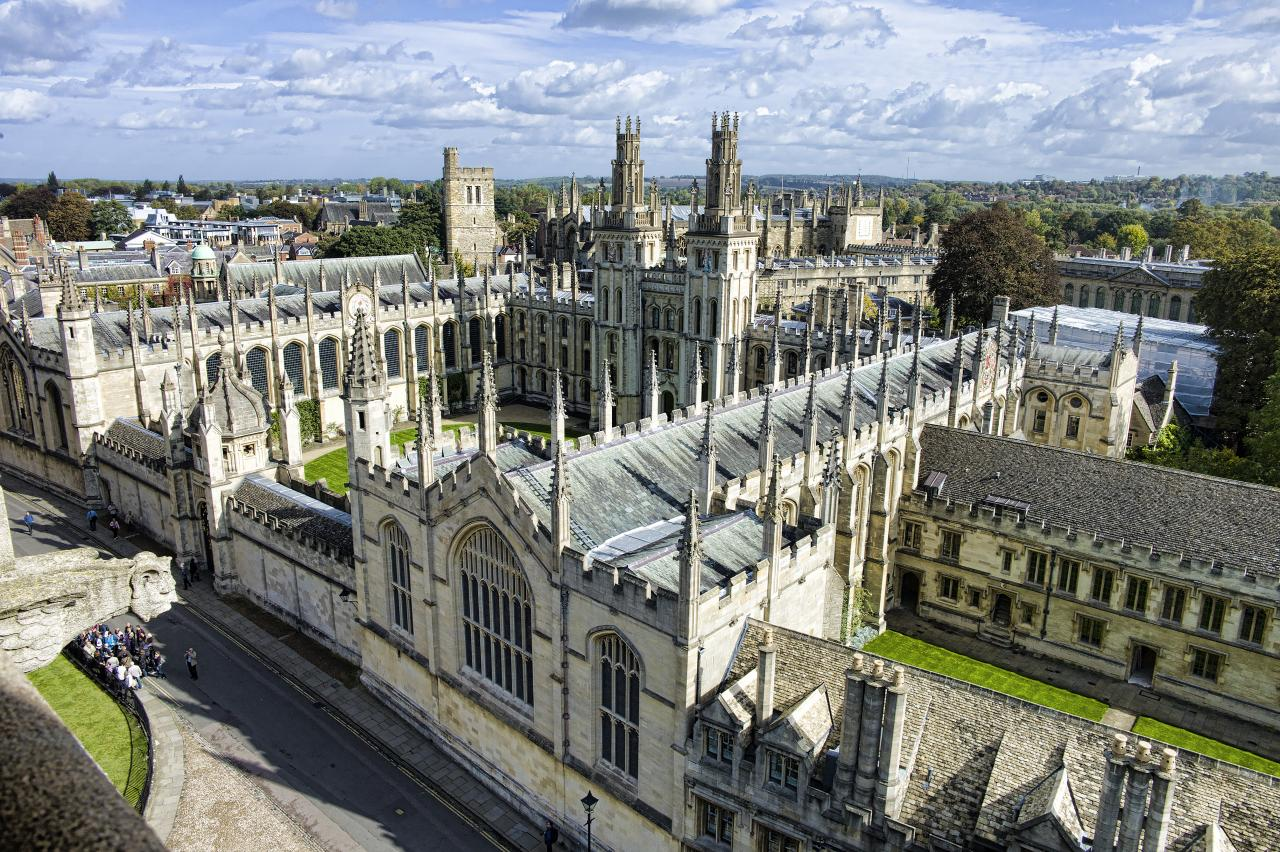
University of Oxford
(All Souls College)

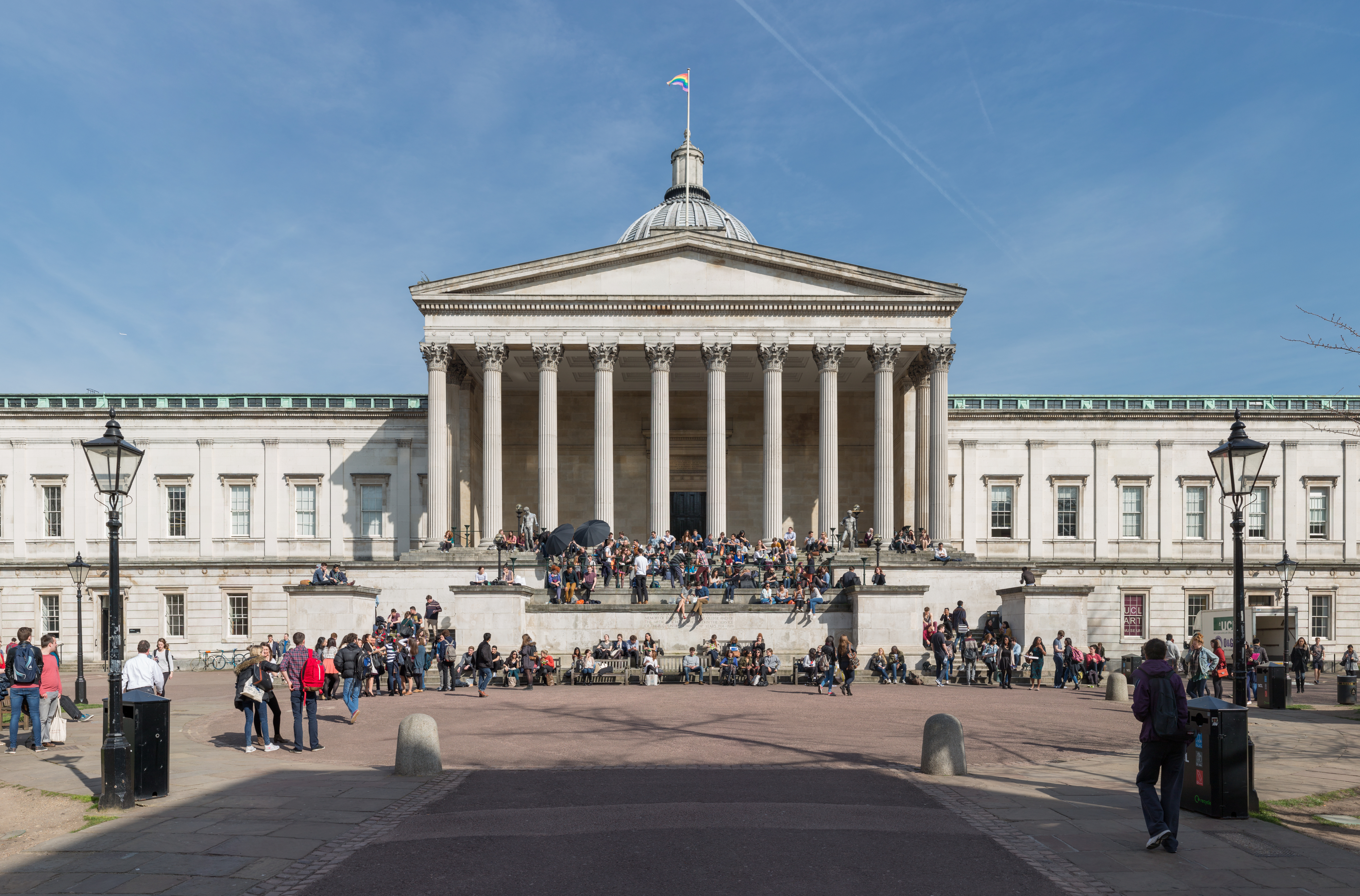
University College London
(Wilkins Building)

== See also ==
- Ivy League (older private universities in the United States)
- Imperial Universities (Japan)
- C9 League The Chinese Ministry of Education's formal grouping of elite universities in China
- SKY (universities) (Korea)
- Institutes of National Importance (India)
- National Institutes of Technology – 30 leading public engineering universities in India
- Research-intensive cluster
- Global Medical Excellence Cluster
- MedCity (London)
- Russell Group A formal grouping of research universities in the UK
- SES-5 A formal grouping of universities in the South East of the UK
- Group of Eight A formal group of eight universities in Australia
- Doxbridge, a portmanteau for a combination of Oxbridge and Durham University
- Ancient universities Oxbridge, Scottish, and Irish Universities formed before the year 1600 with unique undergraduate MA awarding powers
