= Festival of Nature =

Science festival in the West of England

- Locations: Bristol, Bath
- Years active: 2003 – present
- Organiser: The Natural History Consortium
- Website: www.festivalofnature.org.uk

The Festival of Nature is an annual science festival in the UK which describes itself as the UK's largest free celebration of the natural world. The festival takes place in June across Bristol, and Bath. Featuring events, including lectures, tours and film screenings on subjects of science, natural history and the environment.

The festival, run by Natural History Consortium, has taken place across the region since 2003.

Historically, the festival has held events at, We The Curious, Bristol Museum & Art Gallery, Bristol Zoo, the University of Bristol and the University of the West of England, though there are many other events across the cities, such as at Blaise Castle Estate and Leigh Woods National Nature Reserve.

Notable past speakers include broadcasters David Attenborough and David Bellamy, geneticist Steve Jones and primatologist Jane Goodall.

The Natural History Consortium also organises 'Communicate', a conference of scientists, environmentalists, broadcasters and journalists, who meet to discuss the issue of communicating conservation issues to the public, as well at the UK's BioBlitz network.
