= Flying Start Challenge =

The Flying Start Challenge is a contest run by Aerospace businesses and organisations in the South West of England for local secondary schools which aims to help develop science and engineering skills in young people whilst promoting careers in engineering. The Challenge, which has been running for more than a decade, involves upwards of 500 students from 30+ schools annually.

The sponsoring companies throughout the years of the challenge have included Safran Landing Systems, Airbus, Atkins, GE Aerospace, MBDA, Dowty Propellers and Leonardo.

The Challenge is open to pupils in Years 7 to 9 who are organised into teams of 4 with the aim of "designing and building a hand-launched glider to fly as far and as straight as possible". Each team is supported by graduates, apprentices and trainees from the sponsor companies, with lessons on flight dynamics, design, manufacture, and testing, in addition to some practical advice on their glider designs.

Teams selected to represent their schools have the opportunity to compete at a Regional Final where they are judged on the distance their gliders fly as well as a poster presentation where they explain the design decisions. Each of the 3 regions (Bristol, Gloucestershire, and Yeovil) host their own Regional Finals.

The winning teams from the Regional Final progress to the Grand Final where they take part in a series of engineering challenges organised by the companies involved and compete to be named the best team. Past Grand Finals have been held at the Fleet Air Arm Museum at Yeovilton, the University of Bristol, and the University of the West of England. The winning team receive free glider flights with the winning school awarded a voucher for £1000 of Science, Technology, Engineering and Mathematics (STEM) equipment. Second place receives £500, third place £250.
