= Russell Group =

British association of universities

- Formation: 1994; 32 years ago
- Type: Association of United Kingdom-based universities
- Headquarters: Acre House; 11/15 William Road; London; NW1 3ER
- Region served: United Kingdom
- Members: 24: University of Birmingham; University of Bristol; University of Cambridge; Cardiff University; Durham University; University of Edinburgh; University of Exeter; University of Glasgow; Imperial College London; King's College London; University of Leeds; University of Liverpool; London School of Economics; University of Manchester; Newcastle University; University of Nottingham; University of Oxford; Queen Mary University of London; Queen's University Belfast; University of Sheffield; University of Southampton; University College London; University of Warwick; University of York
- Key people: Libby Hackett (Chief Executive); Evelyn Welch (Chair)
- Website: russellgroup.ac.uk

The Russell Group is a self-selected association of twenty-four public research universities in the United Kingdom. The group is headquartered in Cambridge and was established in 1994 to represent its members' interests, principally to government and parliament. It was incorporated in 2007. Its members are often perceived as being the UK's best universities, which has been widely disputed.

As of 2017, Russell Group members receive over three-quarters of all university research grant and contract income in the United Kingdom. Russell Group members award 60% of all doctorates gained in the United Kingdom. In the 2021 Research Excellence Framework, Russell Group universities accounted for 65% of all world-leading (4*) research conducted in the UK, and 91% of the Russell Group's research was judged to be world-leading (4*) or internationally excellent (3*). In the 2023 Teaching Excellence and Student Outcomes Framework (TEF), of the 20 English Russell Group universities which were assessed, 7 hold gold awards (35%) and 13 silver (65%). This compares to proportions across 128 higher education institutions of which 29% hold gold, 62% silver, and 9% bronze. Their graduates hold 61% of all UK jobs that require a university degree, despite being only 17% of all higher education graduates.

The Russell Group is named after the location of the first informal meetings of the Group, which took place at the Hotel Russell in Russell Square, London.

== History ==
The Russell Group of universities was formed in 1994 by 17 British research universities – Birmingham, Bristol, Cambridge, Edinburgh, Glasgow, Imperial College London, Leeds, Liverpool, London School of Economics, Manchester, Newcastle, Nottingham, Oxford, Sheffield, Southampton, University College London and Warwick, who originally met at Hotel Russell shortly before meetings of the Committee of Vice-Chancellors and Principals (now Universities UK) in nearby Tavistock Square, close to the University of London buildings and, particularly, Senate House. With the exception of Warwick (established in the 1960s), the founder members of the group were all universities or university colleges prior to World War I, including most of Britain's ancient universities and "redbrick universities". In 1998, Cardiff University and King's College London joined the group.

In March 2001, the Russell Group decided against selecting a preferred option for the future funding of higher education, stating that endowments, a graduate contribution, increased public funding and top-up fees should all remain options. In December 2005, it was announced that the Russell Group would be appointing its first full-time director-general as a result of a planned expansion of its operations, including commissioning and conducting its own policy research. In November 2006, Queen's University Belfast was admitted as the twentieth member of the group. In the same month Wendy Piatt, the then deputy director in the Prime Minister's strategy unit, was announced as the group's new Director General and chief executive.

In March 2012, it was announced that four universities – Durham, Exeter, Queen Mary University of London; and York – would become members of the Russell Group in August of the same year. All of the new members had previously been members of the 1994 Group of British universities.

In January 2013, it was announced that the Russell Group would establish an academic board to advise the English exams watchdog Ofqual on the content of A-Levels. In 2019, the group launched the website "Informed Choices" to advise school children on which A-level subject choices were useful for various degree courses, replacing an earlier teachers' guide of the same name from 2011 that had identified a list of "facilitating subjects'.

== Organisation ==
Locations of Russell Group universities

=== Objectives ===
The Russell Group states that "its aim is to help ensure that our universities have the optimum conditions in which to flourish and continue to make social, economic and cultural impacts through their world-leading research and teaching".

It works towards this by lobbying the UK government and parliament; commissioning reports and research; creating a forum in which its member institutions can discuss issues of common concern; and identify opportunities for them to work together.

=== Leadership ===
The Russell Group is led by Chief Executive Libby Hackett and chaired by Evelyn Welch, Vice-Chancellor of the University of Bristol.

Russell Group chairs 2000–2029
Name	Dates	Institution
Colin Lucas	2000–2003	Oxford
Michael Sterling	2003–2006	Birmingham
Malcolm Grant	2006–2009	UCL
Michael Arthur	2009–2012	Leeds
David Eastwood	2012–2015	Birmingham
David Greenaway	2015–2017	Nottingham
Anton Muscatelli	2017–2020	Glasgow
Nancy Rothwell	2020–2023	Manchester
Chris Day	2023–2026	Newcastle
Evelyn Welch	2026–2029	Bristol

== Members ==
The Russell Group currently has twenty-four members, of which twenty are from England, two from Scotland, and one from each of Wales and Northern Ireland. Of the English members, five are from Greater London; three from the Yorkshire and the Humber region; two from each of the North East, North West, West Midlands, South West and South East regions; and one from each of the East Midlands and East regions. Four Russell Group members are constituent colleges of the University of London and a fifth London institution, Imperial College London, was part of the University of London until 2007.

The table below gives the members of the group, along with when they joined, their student and staff numbers, and their latest Teaching Excellence Framework overall rating (non-English universities were not assessed).

University	Nation	Year of joining	Undergraduate students (2021/22)	Postgraduate students (2021/22)	Total students (2021/22)	Total academic staff (2022/23)	TEF award
University of Birmingham	England	1994	25,150	12,840	37,990	3,195	Silver†
University of Bristol	England	1994	23,055	8,425	31,485	2,830	Silver
University of Cambridge	England	1994	13,645	8,960	22,610	4,935	Gold*
Cardiff University	Wales	1998	23,765	10,220	33,985	2,540	—N/a
Durham University	England	2012	17,395	4,835	22,230	1,745	Silver
University of Edinburgh	Scotland	1994	26,000	15,245	41,250	4,200	—N/a
University of Exeter	England	2012	23,755	8,710	32,465	2,320	Gold*
University of Glasgow	Scotland	1994	23,460	19,520	42,980	3,155	—N/a
Imperial College London	England	1994	11,740	9,730	21,470	3,715	Gold
King's College London^{‡}	England	1998	23,225	18,270	41,490	3,850	Silver
University of Leeds	England	1994	27,015	10,175	37,190	3,040	Silver†
University of Liverpool	England	1994	22,265	6,415	28,680	2,440	Gold
London School of Economics^{‡}	England	1994	5,575	7,400	12,975	1,095	Silver
University of Manchester	England	1994	30,900	15,505	46,410	4,195	Silver
Newcastle University	England	1994	20,760	6,520	27,280	2,525	Silver†
University of Nottingham	England	1994	28,690	8,570	37,260	2,870	Silver
University of Oxford	England	1994	15,685	11,610	27,290	6,005	Gold*
Queen's University Belfast	N. Ire.	2006	17,970	7,325	25,295	1,775	—N/a
Queen Mary University of London^{‡}	England	2012	17,430	8,615	26,045	2,065	Silver†
University of Sheffield	England	1994	20,040	10,820	30,860	2,855	Silver
University of Southampton	England	1994	15,110	8,685	23,795	2,060	Silver
University College London^{‡}	England	1994	23,800	23,030	46,830	6,460	Silver
University of Warwick	England	1994	18,955	9,870	28,825	2,270	Gold*
University of York	England	2012	15,350	8,070	23,420	1,810	Gold

Notes:
^{‡} Member institution of the University of London, awarding its own degrees
^{*} Achieved 'Gold' rating in all three categories of the assessment
^{†} Achieved overall 'Silver' rating with one category rated 'Bronze'

== Status ==
=== Research ===
In 2022/23, following the 2021 Research Excellence Framework (REF), the English universities of the Russell Group saw their share of recurring research funding from Research England drop by 2.71 percentage points from the 2021/22 funding (based on the previous 2014 REF) to 68.21 per cent, although most institutions saw a rise in actual funding levels due to an overall increase in funding. The top 19 English institutions in terms of funding continued to all be from the Russell Group, with the top 20 being rounded off, as before, by Lancaster. The LSE was, as in previous REF rounds, the exception, ranking 31st in terms of funding (down from 23rd in 2021/11) and seeing a nine per cent fall (£1.7 million) in its allocation.

In 2015/16, following the 2014 REF, the 19 English universities with HEFCE research funding allocations (excluding transitional funding) in excess of £20 million were all members of the Russell Group. The only English Russell Group institution to receive an allocation below £20 million was the LSE (£18.6 million), which ranked 22nd behind the Universities of Leicester and Lancaster (both on £19 million).

In 2010/11, 19 of the 20 UK universities with the highest income from research grants and contracts were members of the Russell Group. In terms of total research funding allocations from the Higher Education Funding Council for England (HEFCE) in 2007/8, the top 15 universities were all Russell Group institutions. LSE was 21st, due to its focus on less costly social sciences research. Queen's University Belfast, Cardiff, Glasgow and Edinburgh, were not included in this table, as they are not English institutions. The Russell Group institutions received 82% of the total HEFCE research funding allocation.

The research funding figures depend on factors other than the quality of research, in particular there are variations due to institutional size and subject spread (e.g. science, technology and medicine tend to attract more money).

In 2008, 18 of the then 20 members were positioned in the top 20 of Research Fortnight's Research Assessment Exercise 'Power' Table. The other two places were occupied by Durham University and Queen Mary University of London, which were not then Russell Group members but have since joined. The two Russell Group institutions outside the top 20 were QUB (21st) and the LSE (27th), while the other two universities to have since joined were York (22nd) and Exeter (25th). In the equivalent table for the 2014 Research Excellence Framework, the 24 Russell Group members occupied the top 24 positions, with the University of Lancaster in 25th being the highest-ranked non-Russell Group university.

=== Rankings ===
In 2023, all eight UK universities in the ARWU top 100, seventeen of the eighteen in the QS top 100 (the other place being occupied by the University of St Andrews), and all ten in the THE top 100 are members of the Russell Group. The Russell Group provides seven of the top ten in the Complete, Guardian, and Times/Sunday Times.

University	ARWU 2024 (Global)	QS 2026 (Global)	THE 2026 (Global)	Complete 2025 (National)	Guardian 2025 (National)	Times/Sunday Times 2024 (National)
University of Birmingham	151–200	76	98=	12	36	22
University of Bristol	97	51	80=	16	16	16
University of Cambridge	5	6	3=	1	3	3
Cardiff University	151–200	181	201-250	27	46	25
Durham University	301–400	94=	175	6	6	7
University of Edinburgh	40	34	29	15	15	13
University of Exeter	151–200	155=	170=	14	18	11
University of Glasgow	101–150	79	84	29	14	12
Imperial College London	25	2	8	5	5	5
King's College London	53	31	38	24	28	27
University of Leeds	151–200	86	118	23	37	24
University of Liverpool	101–150	147=	143	18=	27	29=
London School of Economics	151–200	56	52	3	4	4
University of Manchester	52	35	56	22	31	23
Newcastle University	201–300	137	144	26	63	37
University of Nottingham	101–150	97	145=	30	62	32
University of Oxford	6	4	1	2	1	2
Queen Mary University of London	201–300	110=	134=	50	74	46
Queen's University Belfast	301–400	199=	198	25	43	31
University of Sheffield	151–200	92	108=	18=	20	18
University of Southampton	151–200	87	129	20	22	17
University College London	16	9	22	9	9	6
University of Warwick	101–150	74	122=	10	8	9
University of York	301–400	169	154=	17	25	15

=== Selectivity ===
All but two of the universities in the Russell Group are part of the Sutton Trust's group of 30 highly selective universities, the Sutton 30 (the absent members being Queen Mary University of London and Queen's University Belfast). The Sutton 13 group of the 13 most highly selective universities only includes one non-Russell Group member, the University of St Andrews.

The top 10 by average UCAS points of new undergraduate students in 2021–22 included three non-Russell Group universities: St Andrews (1st: 212 points), Strathclyde (2nd: 210 points), and Aberdeen (joint 10th with Durham: 185 points). The top 10 by lowest offer rate to new undergraduate students in 2024-25 included three non-Russell Group universities: St Andrews (4th; 30.0%), St George's (7th; 42.0%) and University of the Arts London (10th; 48.4%). The average offer rate, including conditional and unconditional offers, across 'higher tariff' UK institutions (as defined by UCAS) was 63.3% in 2024.

University	Average Entry Tariff^{a}	Offer Rate (%)^{b}
University of Birmingham	158	69.6
University of Bristol	174	67.6
University of Cambridge	209	24.5
Cardiff University	153	73.4
Durham University	185	67.6
University of Edinburgh	197	43.6
University of Exeter	164	85.1
University of Glasgow	209	66.5
Imperial College London	206	32.8
King's College London	171	44.3
University of Leeds	162	59.9
University of Liverpool	147	73.2
London School of Economics	195	21.0
University of Manchester	167	57.7
Newcastle University	151	80.2
University of Nottingham	154	70.1
University of Oxford	205	20.3
Queen Mary University of London	151	64.5
Queen's University Belfast	156	73.5
University of Sheffield	157	77.7
University of Southampton	156	76.5
University College London	190	35.2
University of Warwick	173	70.8
University of York	157	79.3

Notes:
^{a} The average UCAS tariff achieved by new undergraduate students entering the university in 2021–22. This is based on qualifications achieved, for example A-levels: A* = 56, A = 48, B = 40 UCAS points; IBO Certificate in Higher Level: H7 = 56, H6 = 48, H5 = 32.
^{b} The average offer rate for June deadline undergraduate applicants (all ages) in 2024.

=== Finances ===
The Russell Group accounted for 49.1% of the income of the higher education sector in the UK in 2013–14, having risen from 44.7% of the total in 2001–02. Over the same period the total income of Russell Group universities rose by 69.9% in real terms, compared to a sector average of 54.4%. Russell Group universities are also seen as "particularly creditworthy" due to their membership of the group, allowing them to borrow money at low interest rates.

The total annual income for Russell Group members for 2023/24 was £25.31 billion (2020/21 – £20.30 billion) of which £5.67 billion (2020/21 – £4.77 billion) was from research grants and contracts, with an operating surplus of £6.50 billion (2020/21 – £1.15 billion). Russell Group universities hold a total endowment value of £6.66 billion excluding colleges (2020/21 – £6.18 billion) and net assets of £41.08 billion (2020/21 – £31.52 billion). The table below is a record of each Russell Group member's financial data for the 2023/24 financial year.

University	Government funding body grants (£m)	Teaching income (£m)	Teaching income as % of total income	Research income (£m)	Research income as % of total income	Total income (£m)	Operating surplus (£m)	Surplus as % of total income	Endowment value (£m)	Total net assets (£m)
University of Birmingham	109.5	456.3	49.3%	205.2	22.2%	926.0	199.5	21.5%	155.8	1,309.7
University of Bristol	119.0	459.9	43.4%	294.1	27.7%	1,060.1	291.4	27.5%	98.7	1,580.8
University of Cambridge^{‡}	202.5	394.9	16.1%	568.8	23.2%	2,449.4	387.5	15.8%	2,259.0	7,254.7
Cardiff University	83.2	328.3	51.5%	126.6	19.8%	638.0	137.6	21.6%	53.1	852.6
Durham University^{‡}	48.2	301.9	58.8%	60.7	11.8%	513.4	120.4	23.5%	106.6	544.3
University of Edinburgh	208.7	527.2	38.0%	365.2	26.4%	1,385.8	400.1	28.9%	580.4	3,002.6
University of Exeter	72.8	350.6	52.6%	129.2	19.4%	666.6	186.1	27.9%	51.6	616.6
University of Glasgow	182.7	387.8	40.8%	221.1	23.2%	950.0	291.4	30.7%	262.4	1,409.0
Imperial College London	165.4	507.5	38.8%	396.2	30.3%	1,309.3	258.1	19.7%	235.2	2,081.8
King's College London	144.9	630.5	49.6%	256.9	20.2%	1,270.7	326.7	25.7%	324.8	1,670.9
University of Leeds	101.8	563.8	53.8%	190.9	18.2%	1,047.8	299.7	28.6%	94.8	1,264.6
University of Liverpool	93.4	367.1	52.1%	123.3	17.5%	705.3	189.5	26.9%	193.8	885.6
London School of Economics	26.8	316.4	60.2%	41.4	7.9%	525.6	181.2	34.5%	255.5	1,008.8
University of Manchester	151.0	714.3	52.3%	287.9	21.1%	1,365.2	340.0	24.9%	240.2	2,214.7
Newcastle University	88.7	307.4	49.6%	126.1	20.4%	619.8	144.8	23.4%	94.8	627.2
University of Nottingham	120.7	437.5	52.4%	141.6	17.0%	834.7	219.4	26.3%	78.1	783.5
University of Oxford^{‡}	224.7	524.7	18.6%	777.8	27.5%	2,829.1	766.6	27.1%	1,198.7	6,250.5
Queen Mary University of London	86.9	390.0	54.8%	146.8	20.6%	712.2	189.7	26.6%	48.0	859.2
Queen's University Belfast	107.5	160.0	33.7%	105.2	22.2%	474.2	128.3	27.1%	70.9	658.0
University of Sheffield	109.1	401.8	45.3%	185.8	20.9%	887.9	236.5	26.6%	55.2	1,885.7
University of Southampton	84.0	369.7	49.8%	136.5	18.4%	742.4	220.1	29.7%	12.4	929.3
University College London	228.1	971.2	47.9%	538.8	26.6%	2,028.6	558.2	27.5%	174.8	2,186.4
University of Warwick	74.4	459.6	54.0%	146.5	17.2%	850.5	290.9	34.2%	7.3	733.3
University of York	54.8	260.1	50.5%	100.4	19.5%	515.5	136.1	26.4%	7.8	472.7
Overall	2,888.8	10,588.5	41.8%	5,673.0	22.4%	25,308.1	6,449.8	25.7%	6,659.9	41,082.5

Notes:
^{‡} exclusive of colleges

== Criticisms ==
=== Protectionism ===
The Institute of Economic Affairs has argued that the Russell Group acts out of protectionist interests. It is claimed that this will "restrict competition, discourage innovation and encourage inefficiency, thereby depriving students of lower prices and/or greater choice".

=== Sustainability ===
The twenty-four universities in the Russell Group are responsible for around half of the Scope 1 and 2 carbon emissions of the UK university sector. The Group as a whole has been criticised for an inconsistent and inadequate response to the need to identify emissions and take reduction measures. An Environmental Sustainability Network was announced by the Russell Group in December 2019; as of November 2021 no outcomes from this had been announced.

=== Widening access ===
Analysis by the Labour Party in 2018 found that the number of students from disadvantaged areas has only increased by one percentage point since 2010.

In 2015, Durham academic Vikki Bolívar published a paper, Lies, damned lies, and statistics on widening access to Russell Group universities, criticising the statistical analysis in the Russell Group publication Opening Doors. This had said that "real progress has been made over the last few years" in widening access, but Bolívar highlighted four areas where the statistics used to justify this claim were misleading. She also pointed out that there was "a growing body of statistical research evidence which indicates that one important barrier to widening access at Russell Group universities is that applicants from less advantaged social backgrounds are less likely to be offered places at these universities than comparably qualified applicants from more advantaged social groups" that had not been mentioned in the Russell Group report.

UCAS statistics on offers to applicants from low/high participation neighbourhoods (2022)
	POLAR4 Q1 (lowest participation 20% neighbourhoods)			POLAR4 Q5 (highest participation 20% neighbourhoods)		
University	Offer rate difference^{a}	Flag^{b}	% of all offers	Offer rate difference^{a}	Flag^{b}	% of all offers
Birmingham	+2.3	+	9.2	+0.9	+	39.8
Bristol	+5.6	+	7.3	-1.9	-	48.3
Cambridge	+1.2		5.4	-0.2		50.2
Cardiff	-1.6		9.4	+0.6	+	37.4
Durham	+37.4	+	12.3	-12.7	-	38.4
Edinburgh	+6.8	+	6.1	-1.4	-	49.9
Exeter	+7.9	+	6.9	-3.2	-	46.3
Glasgow	+3.2	+	5.8	+0.3		47.6
Imperial	+6.8	+	7.4	-2.1	-	44.0
King's	+6.6	+	7.1	-1.4	-	41.3
Leeds	+8.9	+	10.4	-2.2	-	42.1
Liverpool	+1.0		10.9	+0.7	+	37.9
LSE	+21.6	+	9.0	-4.3	-	44.0
Manchester	+4.9	+	10.3	-0.4		40.2
Newcastle	-0.2		9.3	+0.4		41.5
Nottingham	+1.0		8.6	+0.6	+	42.8
Oxford	+8.3		8.2	-2.2	-	47.2
Queen Mary	+1.0		5.0	-0.2		37.5
Queen's Belfast	-3.5	-	9.4	+0.8		38.5
Sheffield	-1.6	-	10.8	+0.9	+	37.7
Southampton	-0.4		7.9	+0.9	+	41.3
UCL	+4.9	+	6.3	-0.2		48.9
Warwick	+2.0	+	7.0	+0.5		43.8
York	+0.8		10.3	+0.1		37.9
All higher tariff providers	+4.4	+	8.6	-1.0	-	42.1
All UK providers	0.6		11.6	-0.2		32.0

^{a} – difference between the actual offer rate and the offer rate expected if predicted grades and subject choice were the only factors
^{b} – indicates significantly higher (+), significantly lower (-) or no significant difference from expected rate (blank)

== See also ==
- Association of American Universities – group of US research universities
- Imperial Universities – group of older universities in Japan
- Institutes of National Importance – premier universities in India
- National Institutes of Technology – 31 leading public engineering universities in India.
- Golden Triangle – informal grouping of universities in London and southeast England
- Doxbridge - informal grouping of older collegiate universities in England
- SKY (universities) – group of Korean universities
- C9 League – The Chinese Ministry of Education's formal grouping of elite universities in China
- TU9, alliance of nine leading Technical Universities in Germany
- Group of Eight (Australian universities), formal group of eight universities in Australia
- Ancient universities Oxbridge, Scottish, and Irish Universities formed before the year 1600 with undergraduate MA awarding powers
- Armorial of UK universities
