= MedCity (London) =

MedCity (London) describes the collaboration between the Mayor of London and the capital's health science centres of Imperial College London, King's College London and University College London comprising the London part of the 'golden triangle'. MedCity was launched in 2014 to increase collaboration between Imperial College, King's College and University College London — the capital's three main science universities — and promote the broader 'golden triangle' between London, Cambridge and Oxford to investors. This collaboration is supported by HEFCE and London & Partners and works with the life sciences sector across the greater south-east of England.

MedCity is funded by King's Health Partners, Imperial College Academic Health Science Centre, UCL Partners and the Mayor of London.

== Main areas of work ==
MedCity is positioned in the centre of academic research, industry, investors and the London authority to facilitate and enable various services with a focus on providing a front door service, promote the region, develop an entrepreneurial environment and explain the market.

=== Front door service ===
MedCity acts as a ‘front door’ for businesses, entrepreneurs, investors and academics to come to when they are confused by the complex environment across the region. MedCity welcomes, directs and supports large pharmaceutical companies to digital entrepreneurs, businesses seeking research collaborations and investors looking for investment and considering setting up new funds. Tightly involved with its partners, MedCity provides signposting and relationship formation within and across the region. MedCity also provides help in finding lab, office, shared or co-located work spaces or for specialist laboratories and equipment as the greater south east offers a wide variety of options.

=== Promote the region ===
Promoting the region as a base for life science investment and growth, MedCity is London's life science representative at business, academic and charity conferences and aims at developing a wide stakeholder base for communications to attract international, trade and media interest.

=== Develop an entrepreneurial environment ===
MedCity is actively encouraging and enabling entrepreneurialism by understanding and addressing entrepreneurial barriers as well as supporting entrepreneurial activities. These include business plan competitions, angel investment workshops, pitching events for early stage funding of startups and work with various capital groups to attract funding into the greater south east.

=== Explain the market ===
MedCity enables academic/business interaction at the early stages of idea development by bringing stakeholders together to develop collaborations. Furthermore, an active field is in promoting and explaining the wide and professional clinical trial environment that London and the greater south east offers.

== Gallery ==
MedCity Funders
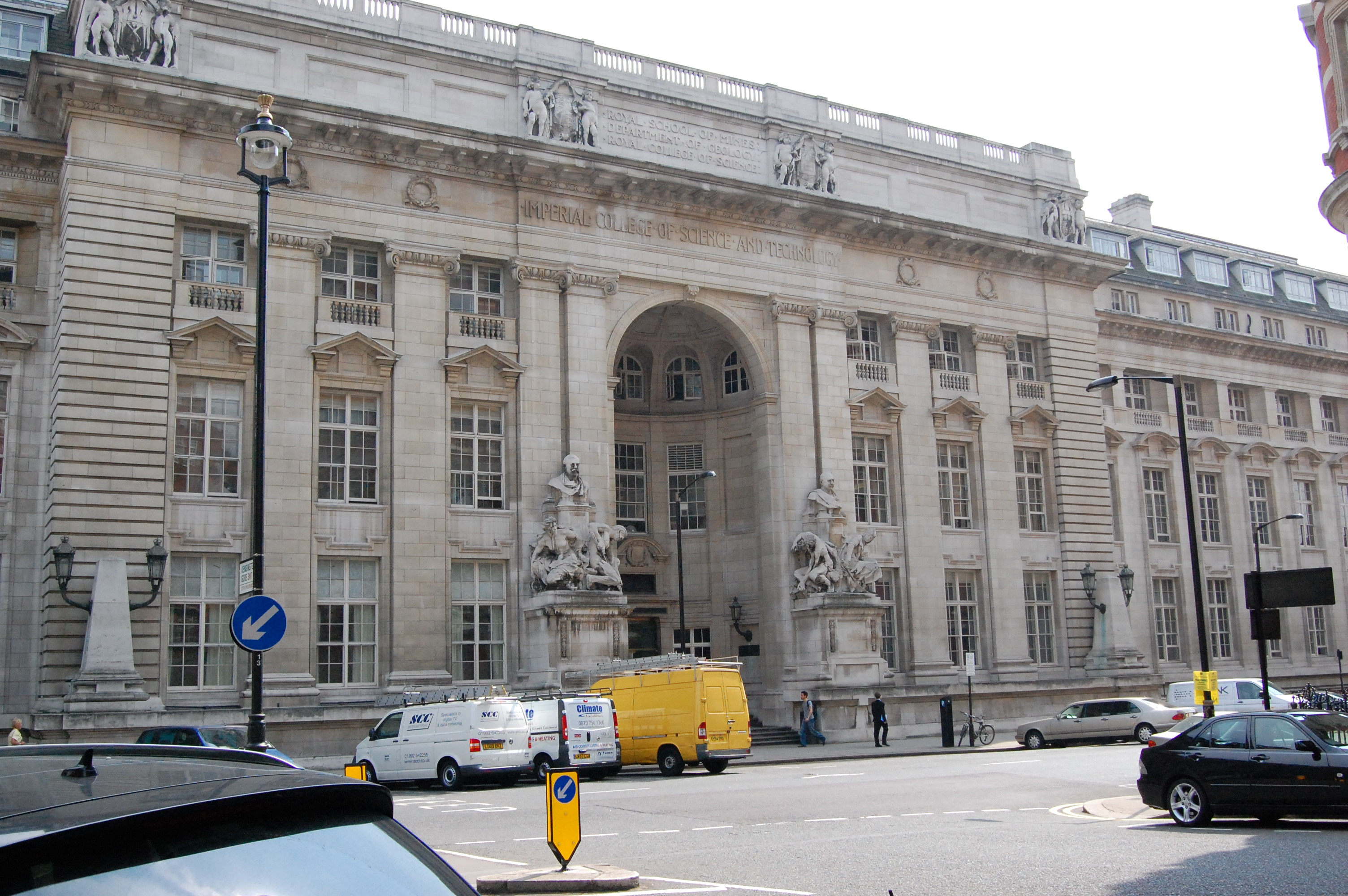
Imperial College London
(Royal School of Mines)

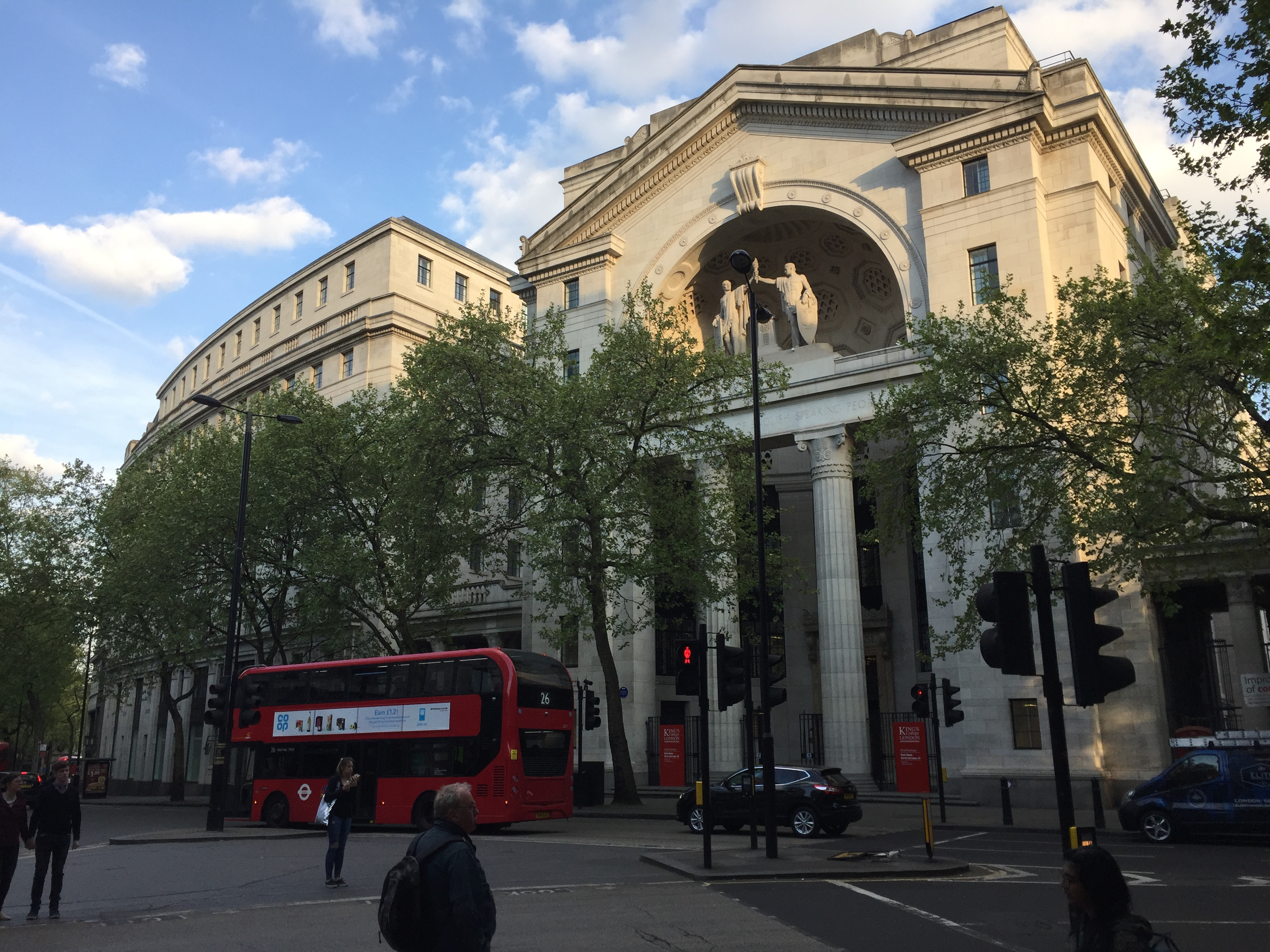
King's College London
(Bush House)

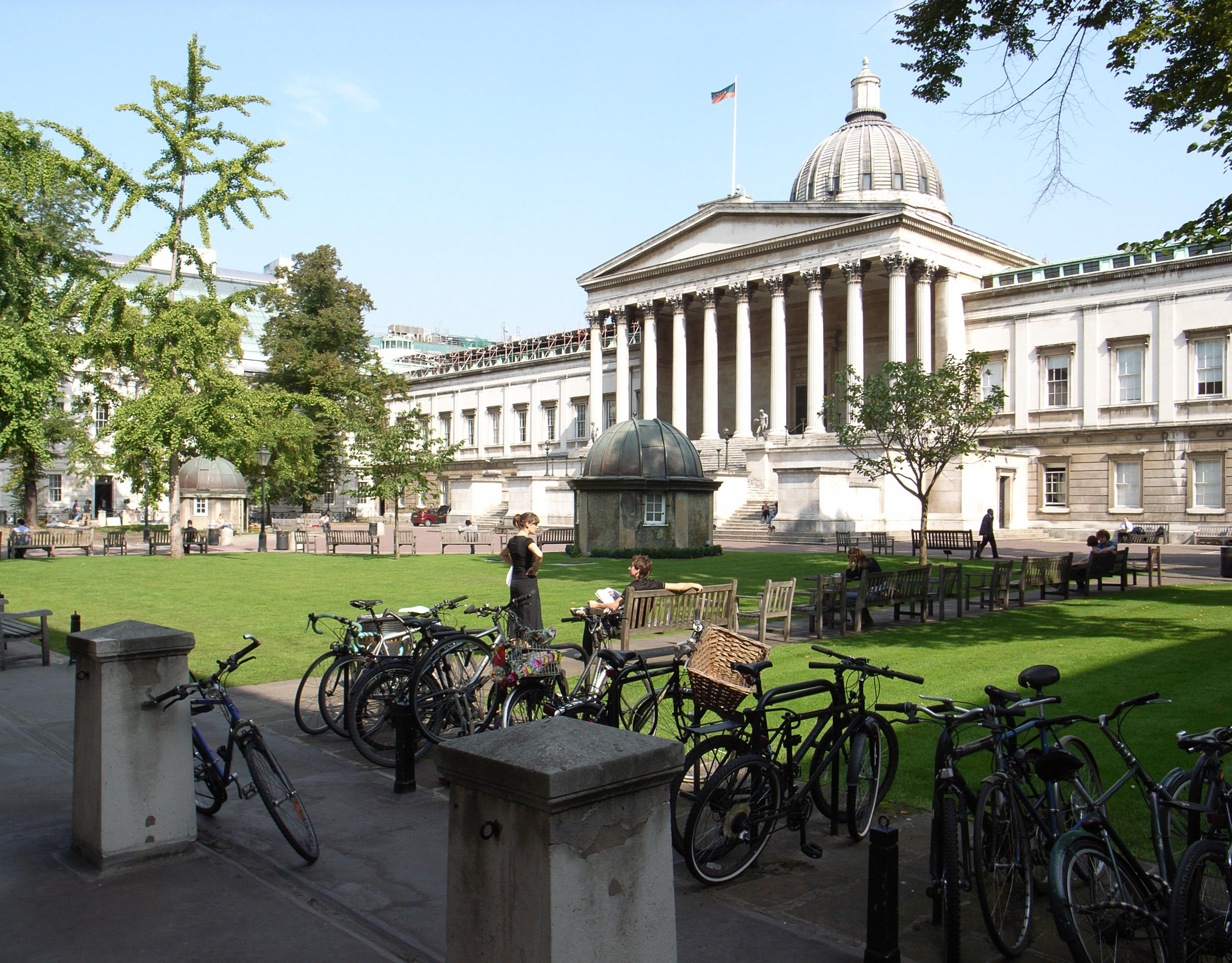
University College London
(Wilkins Building)

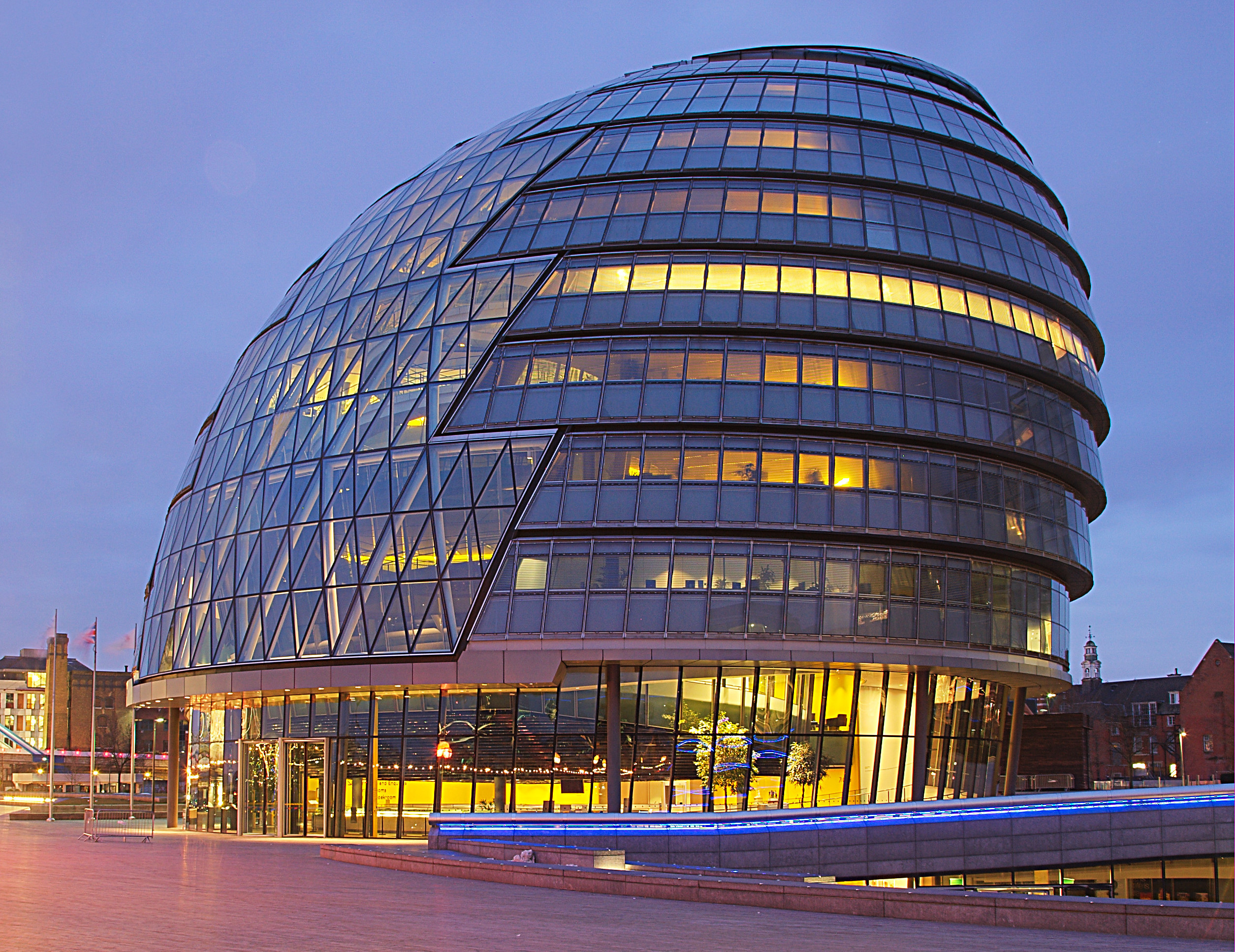
Office building of the Mayor of London

== See also ==
- Golden triangle (universities)
- King's College London
- Imperial College London
- University College London
