= List of schools in Bristol =

This is a list of schools in Bristol, England

== State-funded schools ==
=== Primary schools ===
- Air Balloon Hill Primary School
- Ashley Down Primary School
- Ashton Gate Primary School
- Ashton Vale Primary School
- Avanti Gardens School
- Avonmouth CE Primary School
- Badock's Wood E-ACT Academy
- Bannerman Road Community Academy
- Barton Hill Academy
- Begbrook Primary Academy
- Bishop Road Primary School
- Blaise Primary School
- Brentry Primary School
- Bridge Farm Primary School
- Bridge Learning Campus
- Broomhill Infant School
- Broomhill Junior School
- Brunel Field Primary School
- Cabot Primary School
- Cathedral Primary School
- Cheddar Grove Primary School
- Chester Park Infant School
- Chester Park Junior School
- Christ Church CE Primary School
- Compass Point Primary School
- Cotham Gardens Primary School
- The Dolphin School
- Easton CE Academy
- Elmlea Infant School
- Elmlea Junior School
- Evergreen Primary Academy
- Fair Furlong Primary School
- Fairlawn Primary School
- Filton Avenue Primary School
- Fishponds CE Academy
- Fonthill Primary Academy
- Four Acres Academy
- Frome Vale Academy
- Glenfrome Primary School
- Greenfield E-Act Primary Academy
- Hannah More Primary School
- Hareclive E-Act Academy
- Headley Park Primary School
- Henbury Court Primary Academy
- Henleaze Infant School
- Henleaze Junior School
- Hillcrest Primary School
- Holy Cross RC Primary School
- Holymead Primary School
- Horfield CE Primary School
- Hotwells Primary School
- Ilminster Avenue E-Act Academy
- The Kingfisher School
- Knowle Park Primary School
- Little Mead Primary Academy
- Luckwell Primary School
- May Park Primary School
- Merchants' Academy
- Minerva Primary Academy
- Nova Primary School
- Oasis Academy Bank Leaze
- Oasis Academy Connaught
- Oasis Academy Long Cross
- Oasis Academy Marksbury Road
- Oasis Academy New Oak
- Our Lady Of The Rosary RC Primary School
- Parson Street Primary School
- Perry Court E-Act Academy
- Redfield Educate Together Primary Academy
- St Anne's Infant School
- St Bernadette RC Primary School
- St Bernard's RC Primary School
- St Bonaventure's RC Primary School
- St John's CE Primary School
- St Joseph's RC Primary School
- St Mary Redcliffe CE Primary School
- St Nicholas of Tolentine RC Primary School
- St Patrick's RC Primary School
- St Peter's CE Primary School
- St Teresa's RC Primary School
- St Ursula's E-Act Academy
- St Werburgh's Primary School
- Ss Peter and Paul RC Primary School
- School Of Christ The King RC Primary
- Sea Mills Primary School
- Sefton Park Infant School
- Sefton Park Junior School
- Shirehampton Primary School
- Southville Primary School
- Stoke Bishop CE Primary School
- Stoke Park Primary School
- Summerhill Academy
- Summerhill Infant School
- Two Mile Hill Primary School
- Upper Horfield Primary School
- Victoria Park Primary School
- Wansdyke Primary School
- Waycroft Academy
- West Town Lane Academy
- Westbury Park School
- Westbury-On-Trym CE Academy
- Whitehall Primary School
- Wicklea Academy
- Willow Park CE Primary School
- Woodlands Academy

=== Secondary schools ===
- Ashton Park School
- Bedminster Down School
- Blaise High School
- Bridge Learning Campus
- Bristol Brunel Academy
- Bristol Cathedral Choir School
- Bristol Free School
- Bristol Metropolitan Academy
- City Academy Bristol
- Cotham School
- Fairfield High School
- Merchants' Academy
- Montpelier High School
- Oasis Academy Brightstowe
- Oasis Academy Brislington
- Oasis Academy Daventry Road
- Oasis Academy John Williams
- Oasis Academy Temple Quarter
- Orchard School Bristol
- Redland Green School
- St Bede's Catholic College
- St Bernadette Catholic Secondary School
- St Mary Redcliffe and Temple School
- Trinity Academy, Bristol

=== Special and alternative schools ===
- Briarwood School
- Bristol Gateway School
- Bristol Hospital Education Service
- Claremont School
- Elmfield School for Deaf Children
- Kingsweston School
- Knowle DGE Academy
- Lansdown Park Academy
- New Fosseway School
- Notton House Academy
- St Matthias Academy
- Snowdon Village
- Soundwell Academy
- Venturers' Academy
- Woodstock School

=== Further education ===
- Access Creative College
- City of Bristol College
- North Bristol Post 16 Centre
- St Brendan's Sixth Form College
- South Gloucestershire and Stroud College

== Independent schools ==
=== Primary and preparatory schools ===
- Bristol Steiner School
- Carmel Christian School
- Cleve House School
- Elmtree Grove School (used to be Gracefield School)

=== Senior and all-through schools ===
- Badminton School
- Bristol Grammar School
- Clifton College
- Clifton High School
- Collegiate School
- Queen Elizabeth's Hospital
- Redmaids' High School

=== Special and alternative schools ===
- Belgrave School
- Grace Garden School
- LPW Independent School

== Sources ==
- "List of all school establishments in Bristol".
