= Bristol Academy =

Bristol Academy may refer to

Education

- Bristol Academy of Sport, now SGS Sport Bristol, based at the WISE Campus - part of South Gloucestershire and Stroud College in North Bristol
- Bristol Brunel Academy, a school in Speedwell, Bristol
- The City Academy Bristol, a school in Easton, Bristol

Sport

- Bristol Academy W.F.C., a women's football team based at the Bristol Academy of Sport

Entertainment

- O2 Academy Bristol, a music venue in the centre of Bristol
