= Ashton Park School =

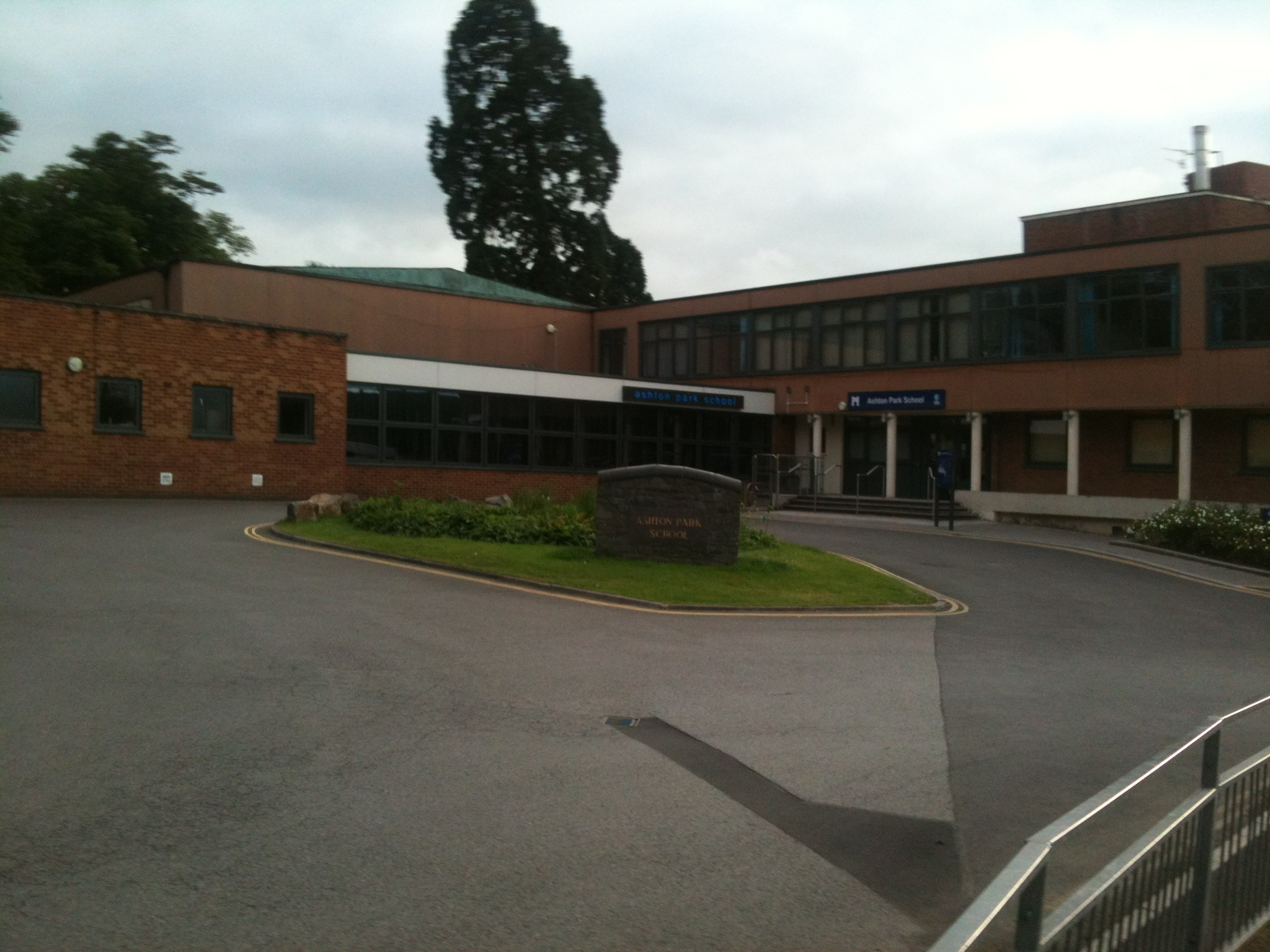
- School entrance

Location
- Blackmoor's Lane, Bower Ashton; Bristol, BS3 2JL; England; 51.44029°N 2.630167°W

Information
- Type: Academy
- Established: 1955; 71 years ago
- Local authority: Bristol City Council
- Trust: Excalibur Multi Academy Trust
- Department for Education URN: 145398 Tables
- Ofsted: Reports
- Head teacher: Richard Uffendell
- Gender: Coeducational
- Age: 11 to 18
- Enrolment: 1203 (Data from January 2016)
- Capacity: 1155 (Data from January 2016)
- Website: www.ashtonpark.net

Ashton Park School is a coeducational secondary school and sixth form located in the Bower Ashton area of Bristol, England.

== History ==
The school opened on 8 September 1955 as Ashton Park Secondary Modern School, built in the grounds of Ashton Court.

Students come from primary schools including Ashton Gate, Hotwells, Southville, Compass Point, Hillcrest Primary School and Luckwell Primary. The school has a sixth form centre which has some of the freedoms of college, but the support of a school, intended to prepare students for the next stage in their life. The school was formerly a specialist Sports College. Ashton Park has many extracurricular clubs for a wide variety of team sports, performing arts and sciences.

Previously a foundation school administered by Bristol City Council, in July 2018 Ashton Park School converted to academy status. The school is now a member of Excalibur Multi Academy Trust.

=== Building ===
The 1950s teaching accommodation was demolished in 2009/2010 and replaced by a new 39-classroom teaching block which opened in September 2010. It is fitted with toilets on every floor (but not in the outlying blocks), CCTV, a recording studio for music students and specialist art classrooms and science labs. There is also a new canteen as well as the old one with a biometric system, so no money is exchanged at the counter.

== Academic achievement ==
The table below shows the school's Progress 8 score.

2016
-0.6

== Ashton Park Sixth Form ==
The Sixth Form Centre is located just behind Ashton Park Secondary School its main intake is students from Ashton Park School, along with students from Bedminster Down, Oasis Academy Brightstowe, Bridge Learning Campus and Merchants' Academy.

They offer a range of A Levels, Vocational A Levels, BTEC First Diplomas and NVQ Courses, as well as GCSE Mathematics and English retakes.

== Notable former pupils ==
- Andy Parfitt, Former controller of BBC Radio 1
- Gareth Chilcott, rugby union player
- Lloyd James, footballer
- Yann Thomas, rugby union player
