= Cotham, Bristol =

Area of Bristol, England

Coordinates: 51.4653°N 2.6012°W

Cotham
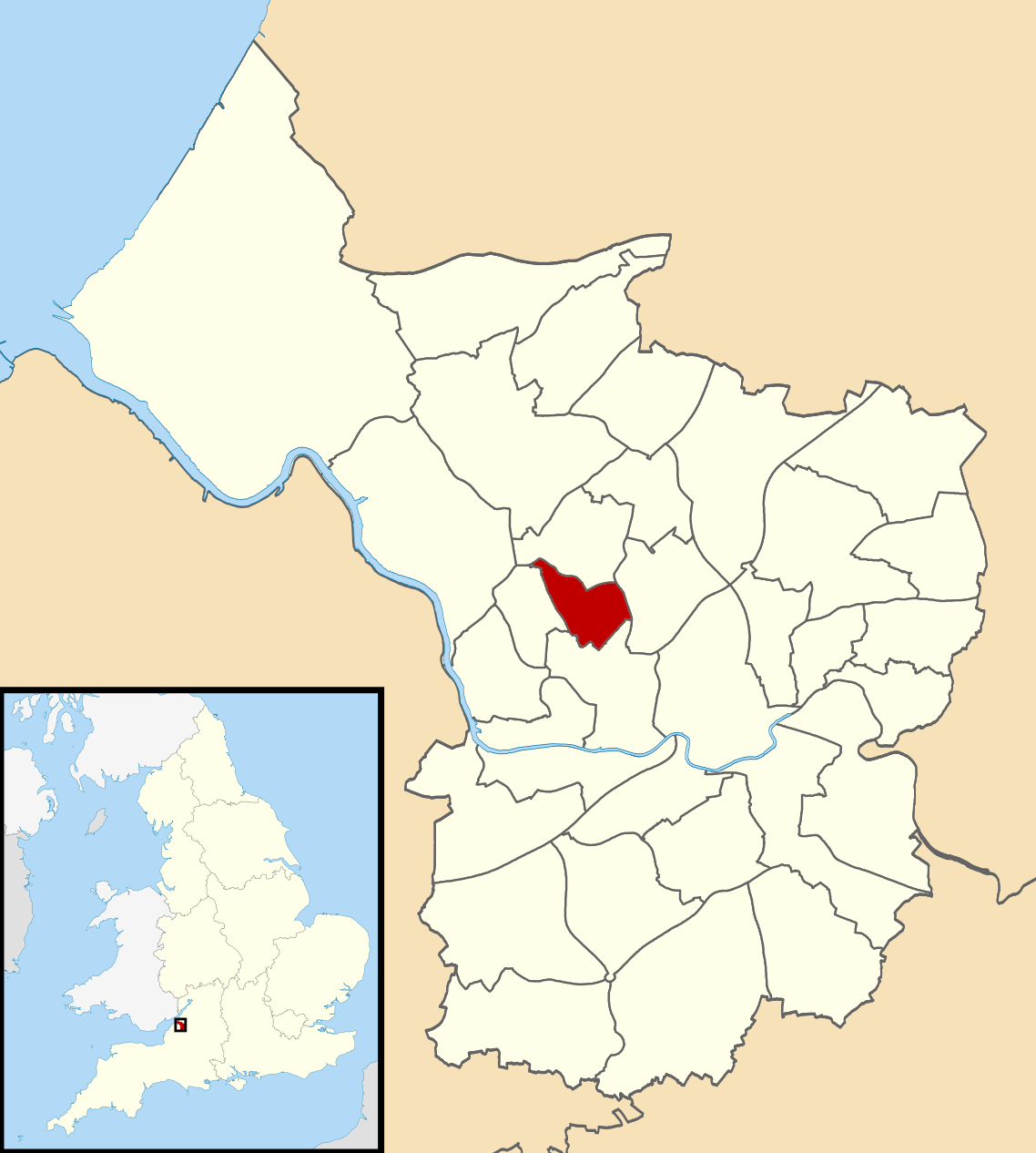
- Boundaries of the city council ward since 2016
- Population: 12,554 (2011)
- OS grid reference: ST583742
- Unitary authority: Bristol
- Ceremonial county: Bristol
- Region: South West
- Country: England
- Sovereign state: United Kingdom
- Post town: BRISTOL
- Postcode district: BS6
- Dialling code: 0117
- Police: Avon and Somerset
- Fire: Avon
- Ambulance: South Western
- UK Parliament: Bristol Central

Cotham /ˈkɒtəm/ is an area of Bristol, England, about one mile (1.5 kilometres) north of the city centre. It is an affluent, leafy, inner city suburb situated north of the neighbourhoods of Kingsdown and St Paul’s.

Cotham is closely related to the neighbourhood of Redland to the north, with the Severn Beach Railway Line broadly marking where Cotham ends and Redland begins, though Ward boundaries show Cotham extending to Redland Road. Redland’s boundaries is usually taken to extend to Coldharbour Road. To the north lies Bishopston and Westbury Park, and Durdham Down to the west. Cotham and Redland together make up the Bristol City Council's Cotham and Redland Conservation Area.

It is also the name of a council ward of the city, which also includes other areas.

== The suburb ==
Cotham is characterised by its individually developed urban streets, dominated by a high-quality Victorian townscape, in conjunction with its spacious, leafy character as a product of the individual gardens and areas of public landscape, both larger than average for an inner city suburb, generally handed down from earlier estate layouts of parklands. Over-arching these two elements is a dramatic local topography, which contributes greatly to the quantity and quality of views and panoramas.

The local architecture is typified by its use of Pennant and Brandon Hill stone and limestone in the form of Bath stone, with brick and render are also found. The hilly topography gives emphasis to roofs, bay windows and chimneys emphasising the scale and substance of victorian villa construction. The escarpments and hillside nature of development has also given rise to a variety of natural stone retaining walls, typical of the area.

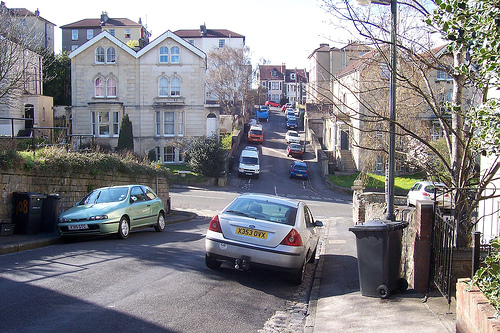
A street scene in Cotham.

It is a cosmopolitan residential area with large old houses, many of which are used as hotels and bed and breakfast accommodation, or divided into flats, and a selection of small independent shops. It also contains the comprehensive Cotham School (formerly Cotham Grammar School).

The top of Saint Michael's Hill in Cotham was one of the historical city limits of Bristol, and the traditional location for hangings. Between 1555 and 1557 three Marian martyrs were burned to death here for their religious beliefs. The gallows form one quarter of the badge of the local Rugby club, Cotham Park RFC.

Cotham Church was built in 1842–1843 by William Butterfield in a Gothic Revival style, as Highbury Congregational Chapel. It was Butterfield's first commission, obtained through his family's connection with William Day Wills of the tobacco firm W. D. & H. O. Wills. The apse, tower, south transept and school were added in 1863 by Edward William Godwin. Since 1975 it has been an Anglican church.

== Demographics ==
Cotham ward had an estimated resident population of 11,693 according to mid-2019 estimates, based on changes to the ward definition in 2016. Using the same data, according to the Census of 2011, following 2016 ward changes, the resident population in mid-2011 was 11,715. The 2011 Census gave the ward a population of 12,554 according to the definition of Cotham ward in 2011.

Mid-2019 estimates gave the population of Cotham ward by age as being 9.0% aged 0–5 years; 33.2% aged 16–24 years; 31.6% aged 25–39 years; 11.7% aged 40–54 years; 6.1% aged 55–64 years; and 8.4% aged 65 years or older.

In the 2011 Census, 81.5% of residents considered themselves as being White British, 1.2% White Irish, 0.1% White Gypsy or Irish Traveller, 6.6% Other White, 3.4% Mixed, 1.6% Indian, 0.3% Pakistani, 0% Bangladeshi, 1.7% Chinese, 1.0% Other Asian, 0.9% Black African, 0.5% Black Caribbean, 0.4% Other Black, 0.4% Arab and 0.4% as Other ethnic group. Overall, 10.5% of residents considered themselves to be from a Black or Minority Ethnic group compared with 16% for Bristol as a whole. 85.1% or residents were born in the UK, with China, Germany and 'Other EU countries' being the top three countries of birth outside of the UK.

In the 2011 Census, the largest group by religious belief was 51.8% considering themselves to have no religion, followed by 35.2% Christian, 8.4% Religion not stated, 1.3% Muslim, 0.9% Buddhist, 0.9% Hindu, 0.8% Other religions, 0.5% Jewish and 0.2% Sikh. Only the proportion of Cotham residents stating as themselves as having No religion (51.8% versus 37.4%) or being Jewish (0.5% versus 0.2%) was significantly higher than Bristol overall and only the proportion stating themselves as being Christian significantly lower (35.2% versus 46.8%).

== Electoral ward ==
The Cotham ward comprises Cotham, Kingsdown, and a large part of Redland, between Cheltenham Road (A38) to the east, and Hampton Road to the west. This follows extensive changes in 2016, when Kingsdown and more parts of Redland were added to the ward.

=== Politics ===
Cotham is part of the parliamentary constituency of Bristol Central. Since 2024 the Member of Parliament is Carla Denyer, a Green Party of England and Wales member.

Cotham is represented by two councillors on Bristol City Council. Currently, these are Mohamed Makawi and Guy Poultney. They are both members of the Green Party.

== Health ==
The Family Practice is a local general practice with a 70 year history. It provides primary care services to over 15,000 locally residents. In 1993 the practice moved to its current building, Western College. The College was designed by the Bristol architect, Henry Dare Bryan, in the Arts and Crafts style and is a Grade II listed building. It was opened in 1906 as a Theological Training College for the Congregational Church. From 1968 to 1990 it served as the offices of the Southern Universities Joint Examination Board. The Family Practice is a teaching practice for both GP specialist training and for teaching medical students from the University of Bristol.

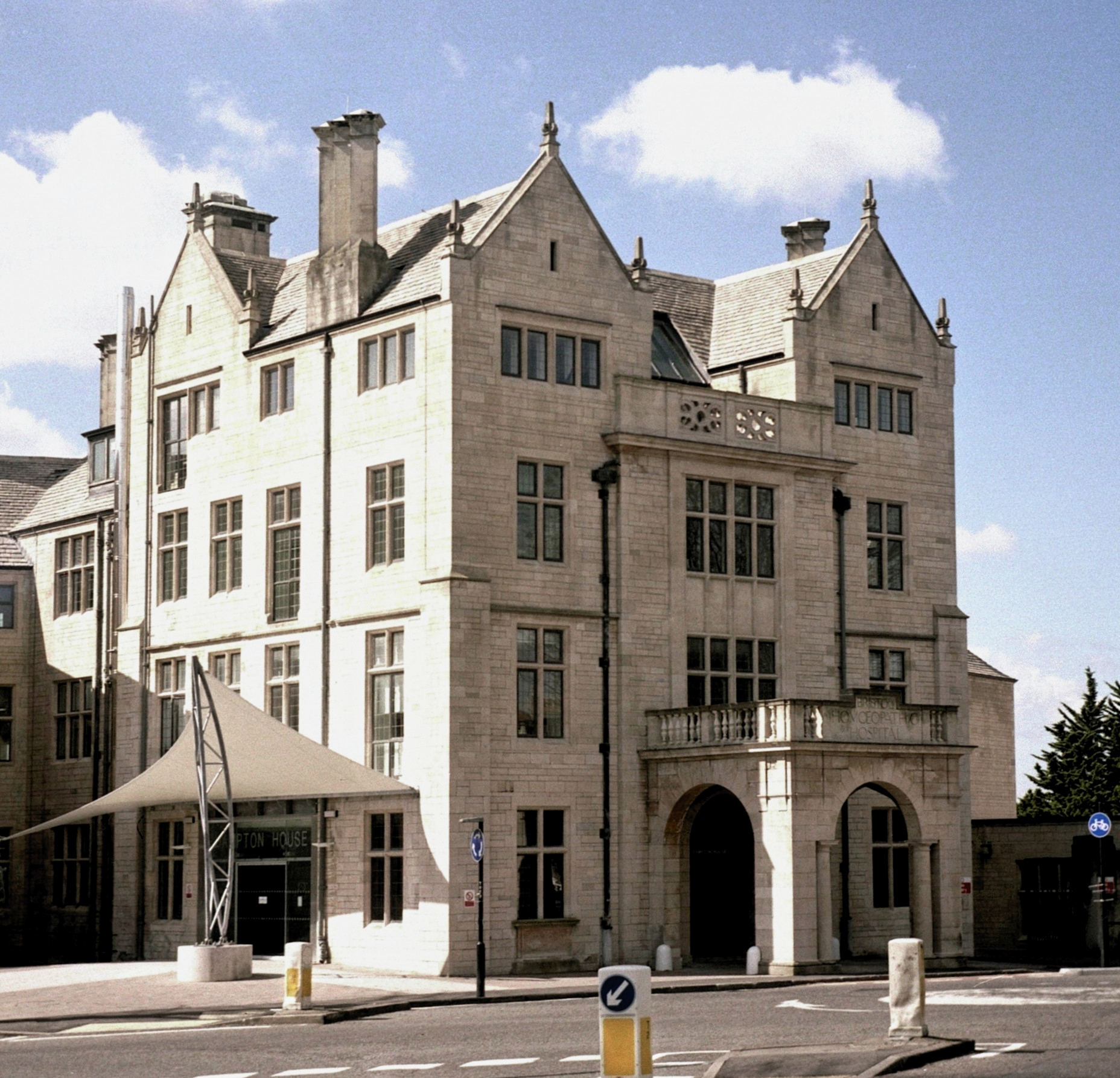
Bristol Homeopathic Hospital, Hampton House, Cotham, Bristol.

The University of Bristol Student Health Service is a separate general practice located at Hampton House Health Centre, opposite Western College, providing primary care service to students of university their families with over 6,000 registrations a year. The Grade II listed Hampton House building itself is the former site of the Bristol Homeopathic Hospital, built in 1925 in the Jacobethan Cotswold vernacular style by George Oatley, a local Bristol architect renowned for the design on many buildings locally, most notably the nearby Wills Memorial Building. Homeopathic treatments had been available in Bristol since 1854. As homeopathy services developed and expanded over time, its popularity required the building of a specialist hospital. Following his appointment as president of the Bristol Homeopathic Hospital in 1916, Walter Melville Wills commissioned the construction of the new hospital at the site, moving from its former location, a building in Brunswick Square. The commission was a gift to the city in remembrance of his son, killed in action in 1915 in the First World War. The Wills family owned a successful Bristol tobacco company and bequeathed the city a number of prominent buildings. Construction began in 1921 with the engraved foundation stone laid by Edward, Prince of Wales. The building ceased use as a homeopathic hospital in 1986 following the defunding of homeopathic services on the NHS.

Life expectancy at birth for Cotham residents is 87.5 years for females and 84.1 years for males. Both are significantly better than Bristol as a whole, where the life expectancy is 82.8 years for females and 78.5 years for males.

All cause premature mortality (defined as the directly age standardised rates of people dying of all causes before the age of 75 years) was 228.6 premature deaths per 100,000 population for Cotham ward, significantly better than the Bristol average of 381.2 people per 100,000 population. For selected causes of premature deaths, the directly age standardised rates of deaths under 75 years were 100.1 cancer deaths per 100,000 people, 25.1 deaths per 100,000 people due to cardiovascular disease and 15.5 deaths per 100,000 people due to respiratory causes. For Bristol as a whole, these rates were 151.6 cancer deaths per 100,000 people, 74.5 deaths per 100,000 people due to cardiovascular disease and 40.0 deaths per 100,000 people due to respiratory causes, with only the rate of premature death due to cardiovascular disease significantly different between Cotham residents and Bristol as a whole.

According to the Bristol Quality of Life survey, 94.0% of Cotham residents consider themselves to be in ‘good health’ compared with 87.6% for Bristol. 16.2% reported having an illness or health condition limiting day-to-day activities at least a little (25.7% for Bristol as a whole). 29.2% were overweight or obese (45.0% Bristol overall). 2.5% were classed as physically ’inactive’ (6.8% Bristol average). 85.7% did enough regular exercise each week (71.2% Bristol average). 5.6% were smokers (9.5% Bristol overall) and 0.6% reported living in households where someone regularly smokes in the house (3.9% Bristol overall).

13.9% were at ‘higher risk of alcohol related health problems’ (16.1% Bristol average). 7.8% were classed as having ‘above average mental wellbeing’ (9.9% Bristol average), whilst 8.0% were reported as having ‘below average mental wellbeing’ (14.7% Bristol average). 2.1% felt ‘lonely because they don’t see family enough’ (3.4% Bristol average). 75.7% reported being ‘satisfied with life’ (75.3% Bristol average) and 25.1% reported ‘very high life satisfaction’ (23.5% Bristol average). 6.1% reported a ‘low life satisfaction’ (9.0% Bristol average).

== Education ==
Cotham School is a secondary school with co-operative academy status, with a capacity for 1480 students between the ages of 11 and 16 years (Years 7 to 11). It is closely associated with nearby Redland Green School. Together the two schools collaboratively feed into North Bristol Post 16 Centre, a sixth form centre also based in Cotham. Cotham School was formally the Trade and Mines School from 1856 to 1885 and the Merchant Venturers' School until 1920.

Cotham School, through its former evolutions, has educated two Nobel Laureates, Paul Dirac (graduated 1918) and Peter Higgs (1946). Dirac, born in Bristol and growing up to the north of Cotham and Redland in the neighbourhood of Bishopston, made fundamental contributions to the early development of both quantum mechanics and quantum electrodynamics. Among other discoveries, he formulated the Dirac equation which describes the behaviour of fermions and predicted the existence of antimatter. Dirac shared the 1933 Nobel Prize in Physics with Erwin Schrödinger "for the discovery of new productive forms of atomic theory". He also made significant contributions to the reconciliation of general relativity with quantum mechanics.

Peter Higgs, born in Newcastle upon Tyne but raised in Bristol, is known for the theoretical discovery of a mechanism (known as the Higgs mechanism) that contributes to our understanding of the origin of mass of subatomic particles, and which recently was confirmed through the discovery of the predicted fundamental particle (known as the Higgs boson), by the ATLAS and CMS experiments at CERN's Large Hadron Collider. Following the discover of the predicted Higgs boson, Higgs was awarded the 2013 Nobel Prize in Physics along with François Englert. Higgs himself was inspired by the work of Paul Dirac whilst at the school. Higgs is recognised by the school through its science centre, the Dirac Higgs science, opened by Higgs himself in 2012.

Cotham Gardens Primary School (formerly Colston's Primary School) is a primary school taking children from the ages of 5 to 11 years.

Although there are no public access libraries in the neighbourhood itself, the area is served by the nearby Redland Library to the west on Whiteladies road, Clifton; Bishopston Library on Gloucester Road to the east; and Bristol Central Library in the city centre to the south.

== See also ==
- Cotham Marble
