= Bedminster, Bristol =

District of Bristol, England

Coordinates: 51.4397°N 2.6037°W

Bedminster
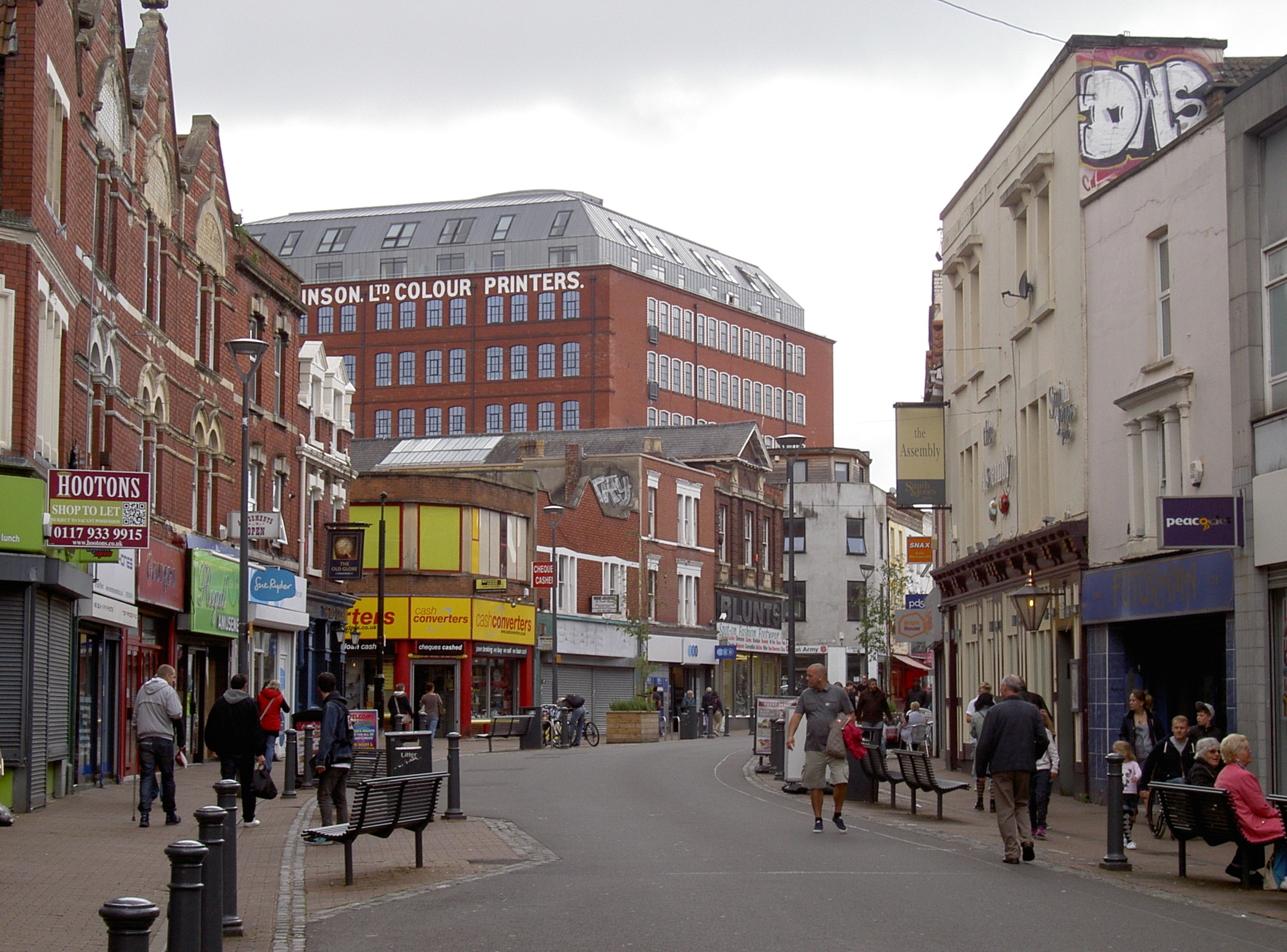
- A view of East Street in Bedminster

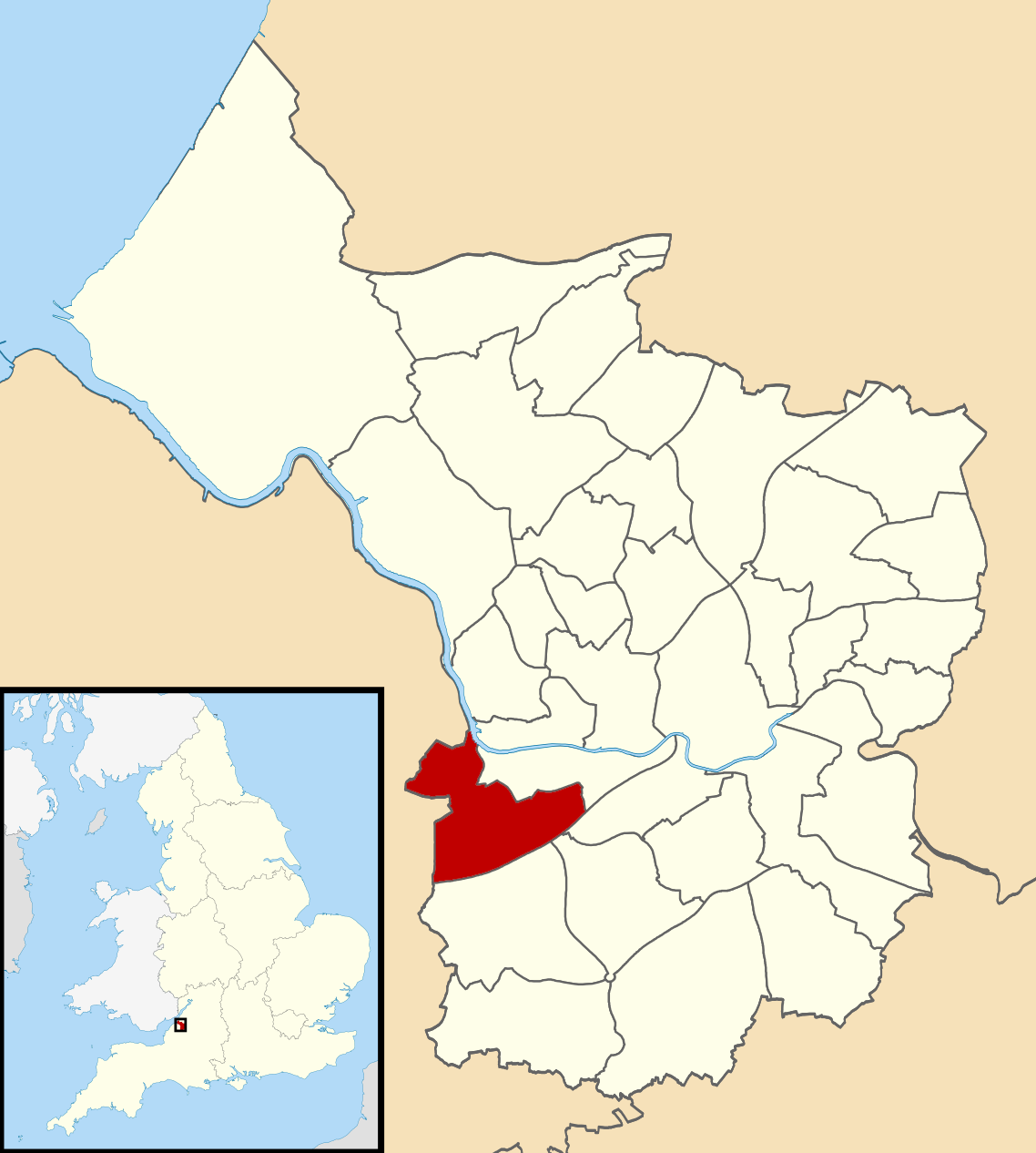
- Boundaries of the city council ward since 2016
- Population: 12,916 (2021, ward)
- OS grid reference: ST580713
  - London: 110 mi (180 km)
- Unitary authority: Bristol
- Region: South West
- Country: England
- Sovereign state: United Kingdom
- Post town: Bristol
- Postcode district: BS3
- Dialling code: 0117
- Police: Avon and Somerset
- Fire: Avon
- Ambulance: South Western
- UK Parliament: Bristol South

Bedminster, colloquially known as Bemmy or Bedmo, is a district of Bristol, England, on the south side of the city. It is also the name of a council ward which includes the central part of the district.

The eastern part of Bedminster is known as Windmill Hill. To the south is Bedminster Down. Southville ward is also part of Bedminster.

== History ==
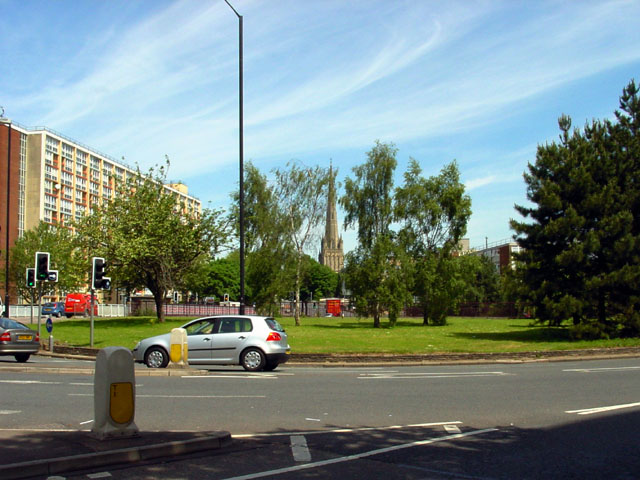
Looking across Bedminster Bridge roundabout

Bedminster was once a small town in Somerset. The town's origins seem to be Roman, centred on the present East Street and West Street. Finds here have been interpreted as an enclosed rural farmstead, dating between the 2nd and 4th centuries, but with possible Iron Age origins. Excavations on the former Mail Marketing International site, West Street, revealed multi-period activity, but with the excavator believing that for the Romano-British period, the archaeological evidence suggested "a rural agricultural settlement encompassing the wider West Street area, with a series of large fields and enclosures extending alongside the reputed minor Roman road atop the ridge".

The river Malago runs through Bedminster to join the Avon, but there is no evidence whatsoever to support the suggestion that it was an early Christian place for baptisms. Historian Anton Bantock proposed that Bedminster's name might derive from a Brittonic word for baptism, beydd. However, academic research linguist Richard Coates disputes this toponymy, stating "the Welsh for 'baptism' is bedydd; this word never even appears in Welsh placenames and it cannot be the source of the medieval spellings of Bedminster".

Substantial Roman remains have also been found at Bedminster Down, including plaster, tesserae (indicating mosaic floors), sandstone roof tiles, coins and pottery. The site is thought to be a Romano-British villa, but its exact nature is very poorly known and despite fieldwork by the University of Bristol Speleological Society in the mid-1920s, it seems never to have been properly recorded prior to being subsumed within housing in the inter-war period. Indeed even its exact position now appears to be problematic, although the Bristol Historic Environment Record (reference 1731M) places it at a location towards the north-eastern end of Brunel Road.

By the late Anglo-Saxon period Bedminster was a manor held by King Edward the Confessor in the 11th century, and in the Domesday Book of 1086 was still in royal hands. The Royal Manor of Bedminster comprised all the land south of the Avon, from the Avon Gorge to Brislington, and in the Domesday Book had 25 villeins, 3 slaves and 27 smallholders. In 1154 it was given to the Lords of Berkeley, who kept it for 300 years. In 1605 it was purchased by the Smyth family of Ashton Court who remained the Lords of the Manor until the 19th century.

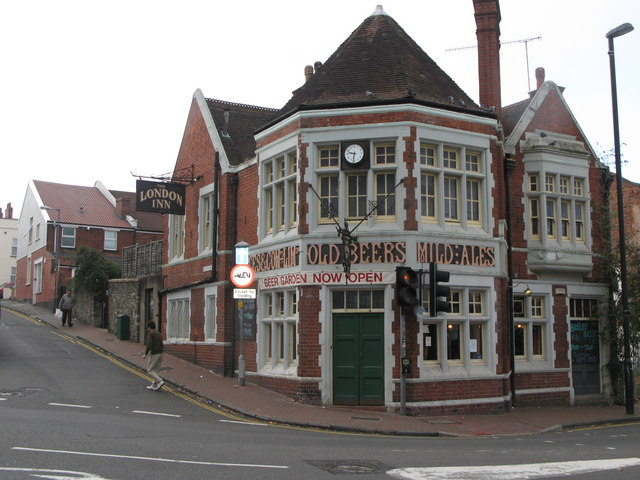
The London Inn, a landmark pub, is at the junction of Cannon Street, East Street and British Road

In 1644, during the English Civil War, Bedminster was sacked by Prince Rupert. When John Wesley preached there in the 1760s, it was a sprawling, decayed market town, with orchards next to brickworks, ropewalks and the beginnings of a mining industry.

Open cast coal mining had been done on a small scale since the 1670s, but in 1748 the first shafts were sunk by Sir Jarrit Smyth at South Liberty Lane. By the end of the century there were eighteen coal-pits operating in the Bedminster and Ashton Vale coalfield. On 10 September 1886, Bedminster's Dean Lane Colliery was the site of an explosion caused by firedamp, probably ignited by a naked flame, killing 10 miners.

Between 1804 and 1809 the New Cut was excavated through the northern part of the parish from Temple Meads to Hotwells, providing a new course for the River Avon, enabling the original course to be held at a constant level so that shipping could stay afloat in Bristol Harbour, now known as the Floating Harbour. In addition to removing the tides, the new cut also helped with reducing silting in the harbour.

In 1840 the shipbuilder Acramans, Morgan and Co opened the Bedminster Yard on the New Cut, to build a number of steam ships including two large vessels for the Royal Mail Steam Packet Company, the 2,000 tonne Avon and Severn in 1842. In 1862 John Payne Ltd took over the yard, then known as the Vauxhall Yard, and continued to build coastal cargo ships, and small craft such as tugs. They closed in 1925, and the site was taken over by Bristol Metal Welding and Spraying Company, who are still in business there today.

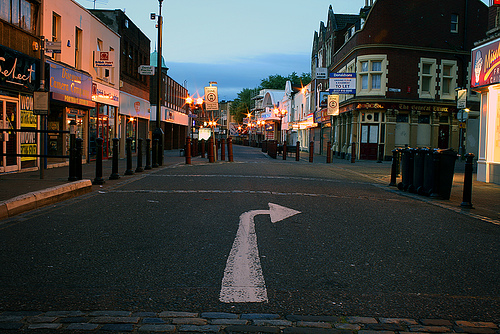
A nocturnal view along East Street

The population of Bedminster increased rapidly, from 3,000 in 1801 to 78,000 in 1884, mostly as a result of the coalfield and industries such as smelting, tanneries, glue-works, paint and glass factories. In the 1880s two major employers moved there – E. S. & A. Robinson (paper bag manufacturers) and W.D. & H.O. Wills (cigarette and cigar makers). The population overflowed to Windmill Hill, Totterdown, Southville, the Chessels and Bedminster Down. During this time, churches, pubs, shops and businesses were built, some of which still survive.

St Catherine's Place was a shopping centre on East Street in Bedminster. By 2024, all of its retail units had closed, and the site formed part of the wider Bedminster Green redevelopment area.

Victoria Park was laid out at the north of Bedminster in the late 1880s to provide recreational facilities for the new housing development. Bedminster Town Hall was erected in 1891.

In World War II, Bedminster was one of several areas of Bristol that were heavily bombed during the Bristol Blitz. Post-war town planning relocated most of the heavy industry to the rural areas to the south of the parish, and new estates grew up in Withywood, Hartcliffe and Highridge.

Bedminster, New Jersey, chartered by King George II in 1748, was named after Bedminster in Bristol.

=== Administrative history ===
The parish of Bedminster was part of the hundred of Hartcliffe. The parish anciently extended north up to the original course of the River Avon at Bristol Bridge, in what is now the city centre of Bristol. Several early chapelries were created within the parish covering where the urban area of Bristol was growing south of the river, including Temple Church by 1147, St Mary Redcliffe by 1158, and St Thomas the Martyr by 1200. These chapelries subsequently became separate civil parishes, and were transferred from Somerset to Bristol when it was made a county corporate in 1373. The ancient parish of Bedminster also extended westwards into a rural area which subsequently became the parish of Abbots Leigh. Although treated as separate civil parishes from the Middle Ages, Abbots Leigh, St Mary Redcliffe and St Thomas the Martyr remained part of the ecclesiastical parish of Bedminster until 1852.

Having lost Abbots Leigh and ceded the three former chapelries in the Redcliffe area to Bristol in the Middle Ages, the boundaries of the civil parish then remained essentially unchanged, and entirely in Somerset, until the nineteenth century. In 1803 the Act of Parliament authorising the construction of the New Cut of the River Avon transferred the northern strip of Bedminster parish, as lay between the old course of the river and the proposed New Cut, from Somerset into the city and county of Bristol, but left the parish boundary unaffected. In 1836 a further area lying south of the New Cut, including the village (as it was then described) of Bedminster itself, was also brought within Bristol's city boundaries. (Note: The northern part of the parish had been added to the Bristol constituency under the Parliamentary Boundaries Act 1832. The Municipal Corporations Act 1835 directed that from 1 January 1836, the municipal boundaries were adjusted to match the enlarged constituency.)

After 1803 the civil parish of Bedminster therefore straddled Somerset and the city and county of Bristol, until the Local Government Act 1894 directed that parishes could no longer straddle county boundaries. The parish was then split into two parts; a reduced Bedminster parish covering the parts within the city of Bristol and a parish called "Bedminster Without" covering the parts outside the city. Bedminster Without ceded further territory to Bristol in 1898 and was renamed Bishopsworth shortly afterwards, which in turn was abolished as a parish in 1951, mostly being absorbed into Bristol. Within the city, the parish of Bedminster was abolished on 30 September 1896, becoming part of a short-lived civil parish called South Bristol before all the parishes in the city were united into a single civil parish called Bristol in 1898. In 1891 the parish had a population of 54,194.

== Education ==
There is one children's nursery and five primary schools in Bedminster:

- North Street Nursery
- Holy Cross RC Primary School
- Parson Street Primary School
- Victoria Park Primary School
- Compass Point: South Street School and Children's Centre (known as South Street Primary School before April 2010)
- Oasis Academy Marksbury Road

And one secondary school, Bedminster Down School.

== Transport ==
The two main shopping streets in Bedminster, East Street and North Street, form part of the A38 road, extending from Bedminster Bridge over the New Cut to Bedminster Down.

The Bristol to Exeter railway line passes through Bedminster, and there are two railway stations, Bedminster and Parson Street. The former Ashton Gate station used to serve the Ashton area and Bristol City F.C.

== Sport and recreation ==
Bedminster is home to many sports teams, including Broad Plain Rugby Club, who play in the Bristol Combination league, and Bedminster Cricket Club, which was founded in 1847 and has historical links with W. G. Grace, who play in the West of England Premier League. Broad Plain RFC are based at Bristol South End, off St Johns Lane, which was the home of Bristol City Football Club before they moved to Ashton Gate Stadium, and later the sports and social club associated with E. S. & A. Robinson.

Bedminster is home to one of Bristol's two city farms, below Windmill Hill, and also the national headquarters for the Federation of City Farms.

A greyhound racing track called the Magnet Racecourse was opened on 9 June 1928, on South Liberty Lane, Long Ashton. The racing was independent (not affiliated to the sports governing body the National Greyhound Racing Club) known as a flapping track, which was the nickname given to independent tracks. The NGRC refused to license the Magnet Greyhound Racing Company because the district already had licensed tracks at Eastville Stadium and Knowle Stadium. Racing was held as many as five times per week on what was described as a horse-shoe shape with the main distance being 475 yards. The track closed on 26 August 1932.

== Council ward ==
The Bedminster council ward does not include the northern part of Bedminster, which is in Southville ward. Nor does it include the area east of the railway line, which is in Windmill Hill ward. Bedminster Down is in Bishopsworth ward. Bedminster ward does include the district of Ashton Vale, to the south of Bedminster.

=== Ashton Vale ===
Ashton Vale includes an area of housing centred on Ashton Drive and South Liberty Lane, served by Ashton Vale Primary School. The northern part of Ashton Vale, adjacent to the Portishead Railway line, is mixed light industrial and retail outlets.

=== Politics ===
The Bedminster council ward elects two members of Bristol City Council. Ellie Freeman (Green Party) and Emily Jade Clarke (Labour Party) are the current ward councillors.

Bedminster is part of the Bristol South constituency, whose MP is Karin Smyth of the Labour Party since 2015.

== Notable people ==
- Alfred Dancey, murderer at the age of fourteen, transported to Australia.
- Princess Caraboo, impostor, lived as a widow in Bedminster. She died on 24 December 1864 and was buried in the Hebron Road.
- Florence Mary Taylor, pioneering Australian architect and aviator, born in Bedminster in 1879.
- Jayde Adams, British comedian, actress, writer and singer, was born in Bedminster in 1984.
- John James was born at 96 Philip Street, Bedminster in 1906.
- Thomas Edward Rendle, Victoria Cross recipient, born in Bedminster in 1884.
