= Cotham School =

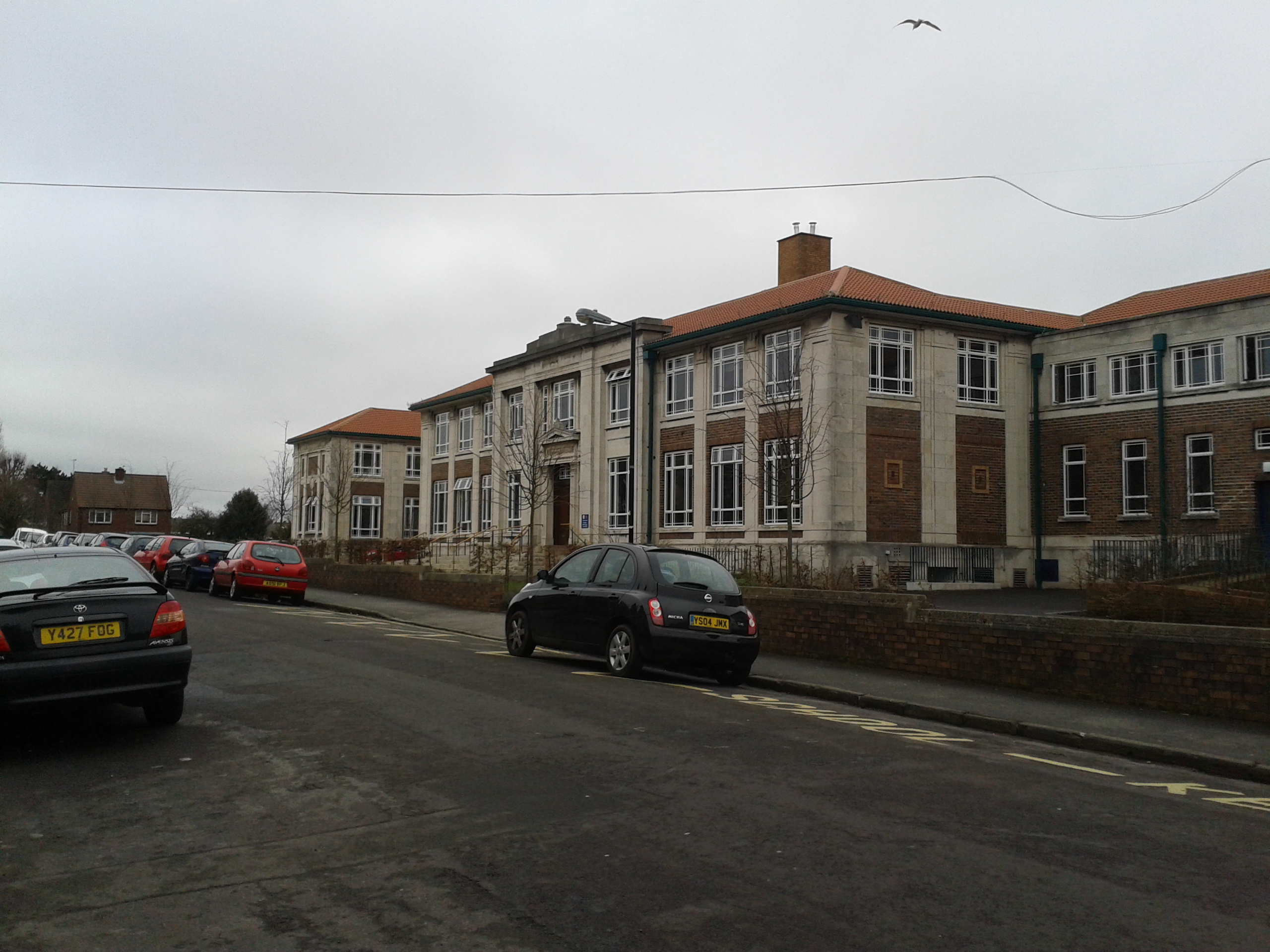
- Cotham School's entrance on es = 51.4636°N 2.6020°W

Location
- Cotham Drive; Bristol, BS6 6DT; England

Information
- Type: Secondary Academy
- Established: 1856; 170 years ago (as the Merchant Venturers' School)
- Local authority: Bristol City Council
- Department for Education URN: 137440 Tables
- Ofsted: Reports
- Head teacher: Joanne Butler
- Gender: Mixed
- Age: 11 to 18
- Enrolment: 1487 (data from April 2018)
- Capacity: 1480 (data from April 2018)
- Houses: Delta, Gamma, Sigma, Omega
- Website: www.cotham.bristol.sch.uk

Cotham School is a secondary school with academy status in Cotham, a suburb of Bristol, England. The catchment area for this school is Cotham, Clifton, Kingsdown, Southern Redland, Bishopston, St Paul's and Easton.

The school shares a sixth form, the North Bristol Post 16 Centre, with nearby Redland Green School. The Cotham campus is situated in Charnwood House, although sixth form lessons also take place at the main school site. Construction on a new teaching and dining block was finished in 2018 and increased the school's capacity significantly.

Cotham School is one of the few schools in the UK to have educated two Nobel laureates: Paul Dirac, who received the Nobel Prize in Physics in 1933, and Peter Higgs, who received the same award in 2013.

== History ==
Cotham School was established in 1856. Its predecessor was the Merchant Venturers' School. Until the academic year 2000/01, Cotham was a grammar school. It became a comprehensive in 2001, and an academy in September 2011. A £20m redevelopment and expansion was completed in 2012, using funding from the Building Schools for the Future programme.

The BBC drama Thirteen was filmed here in 2015.

== Notable pupils ==
- Jacob Anderson, Actor
- Tony Badger, Master of Clare College, Cambridge, 2003–14; Paul Mellon Professor of American History, University of Cambridge, 1992–2014.
- Paul Dirac, Lucasian Professor of Mathematics from 1932 to 1969 at the University of Cambridge, who won the 1933 Nobel Prize in Physics with Erwin Schrödinger for work on quantum mechanics.
- Wallace Fox, Professor of Community Therapeutics from 1979 to 1986 at the Cardiothoracic Institute, Royal Brompton Hospital; did important work on tuberculosis
- David Garmston, journalist
- Peter Higgs, Professor of Theoretical Physics from 1980 to 1996 at the University of Edinburgh; received the 2013 Nobel Prize in Physics with François Englert for his work on subatomic particles including the Higgs boson;
- Maya Jama, TV presenter
- John James, businessman and philanthropist
- Martyn Jarrett, Bishop of Beverley 2000–2012; Bishop of Burnley from 1994 to 2000
- Laya Lewis, actress
- Gary Mabbutt, professional footballer for Bristol Rovers F.C., Tottenham Hotspur F.C. and England
- Arthur Milton, cricketer and footballer
- John Mortimore, cricketer
- Michael Parsons, designer of bridges including the Severn and Humber Bridges
- John Perry, musician and author. Guitarist The Only Ones
- Greg Poole, artist
- Derek Robinson, novelist
- John Saxbee, Bishop of Lincoln 2001–2011; Bishop of Ludlow from 1994 to 2001
- Julian Sedgwick, actor
- John Tidmarsh, journalist
- Amy Willerton, contestant on I'm a Celebrity 2013 and contestant in Miss Universe
- Russell Wood, cricketer

== See also ==
- Education in England
