= Harmony School (Indiana) =

Location
- 909 East 2nd Street; Bloomington, Monroe County, Indiana 47401; United States
- Coordinates: 39.161584°N 86.521637°W

Information
- Type: Private school
- Motto: Education For Life
- Established: 1974
- Director: Steve "Roc" Bonchek
- Faculty: 28
- Grades: PreK-12
- Enrollment: 177 (2015-2016)
- Website: Official Website

Harmony School is a private, democratic school located in Bloomington, Indiana in the historic Elm Heights School building, one block from Indiana University. The school is a single-building establishment, housing all ages—from preschool through high school. The Parenting Harmony Education Center also includes the National School Reform Faculty, which operates from the lower level of the school.

Harmony focuses on individual learning experiences, encouraging students' creative and critical thinking and fostering students' social and emotional development. Teachers put care and effort into opening the curriculum to students' diverse interests and backgrounds. Together, the teachers and students develop a supportive school culture that promotes both independent exploration and constructive relationships among the student body. The school's low teacher-to-student ratio further allows faculty to provide each student with individual help and a level of challenge tailored to their learning needs.

Because of this holistic approach to personalized instruction, Harmony is able to have students share classes within and between PreK–K, K–2, 3–4, 5–6, 7–8, and 9–12 with 2–4 teachers per group. This not only affords students opportunities for advanced instruction in areas in which they excel, it also enables younger students to receive support from their older classmates and older students, in turn, to refine and expand upon their knowledge as they share it.

== See also ==
- List of high schools in Indiana
- Sallyann J. Murphey
