= Dancey =

Dancey is a surname. Notable people with the surname include:

- Alfred Dancey, English murderer
- David L. Dancey (1917–2008), American politician and jurist
- George Henry Dancey (1865–1922), Australian artist
- Ryan Dancey (born 1968), American game designer

== See also ==
- 4021 Dancey, a main-belt asteroid
