= The Chessels =

Area of Bedminster, Bristol, England

Coordinates: 51.43798°N 2.60903°W

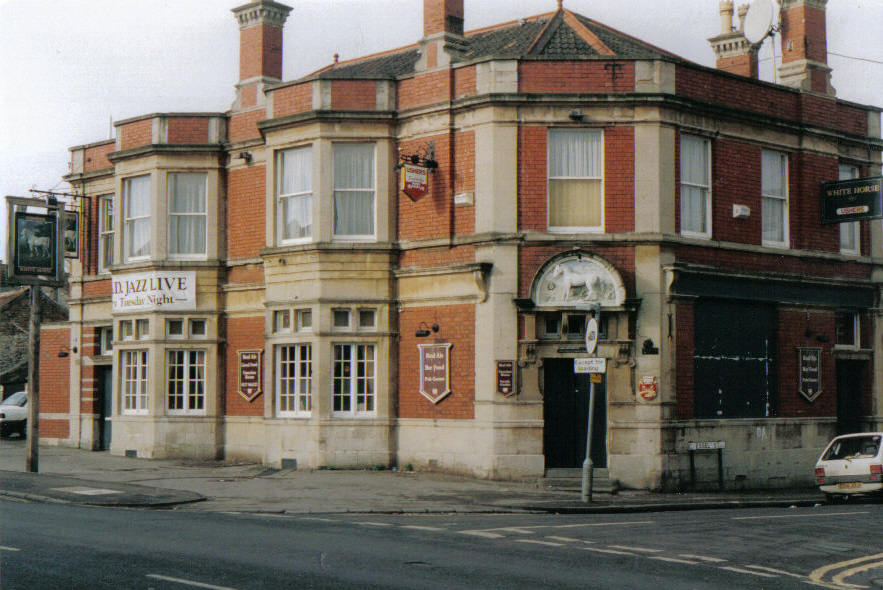
- The corner of Chessel Street and West Street is home to the former White Horse pub (shown here in 1999).

- Location within Bristol
- OS grid reference: ST577712
- Civil parish: Bedminster
- Unitary authority: Bristol
- Region: South West
- Country: England
- Sovereign state: United Kingdom
- Post town: BRISTOL
- Postcode district: BS3
- Dialling code: 0117
- UK Parliament: Bristol South

The Chessels is an area of Bedminster, Bristol, England, that runs from the midsection of Luckwell Rd to the former White Horse pub on West Street. Chessel Street is the main road. The name Chessel is taken from the name of a field, recorded in 1350. The White Horse was redeveloped into flats by 2013, but was once used as a location for the fictional Nags Head pub in the BBC television series Only Fools and Horses.

Chessel Street has a number of streets on either side that are named after gemstones, including Ruby Street, Pearl Street, Beryl Road, Jasper Street and Garnet Street. At the West Street end Chessel Street also turns off into British Road, and at the Luckwell Rd end there is a moderately sized Anglican church, St Aldhelms (built 1906), which is part of the Bedminster Team Ministry.

Until as recently as 1980 there was a shop on every corner of the entire street – over 10 shops. These included a bakery, general store, sweet shop and newsagent, a cooker and electrical shop, and a dry cleaner. As of September 2016 there is now just a funeral directors at the West St end and a hair and beauty salon at the Luckwell Rd end, which was the former post office. The post office counter (named The Chessels) was closed as part of Post Office Ltd's post office closure plan. The post office was described in June 2008 by Councillor Mark Wright as "a focal point for the local community in the Chessels since before anyone can remember." In April 2008, (then) MP for Bristol South Dawn Primarolo objected to the proposed closure of both The Chessels and Bedminster Road branches, noting their high importance to the local communities.
