= Redland Green School =

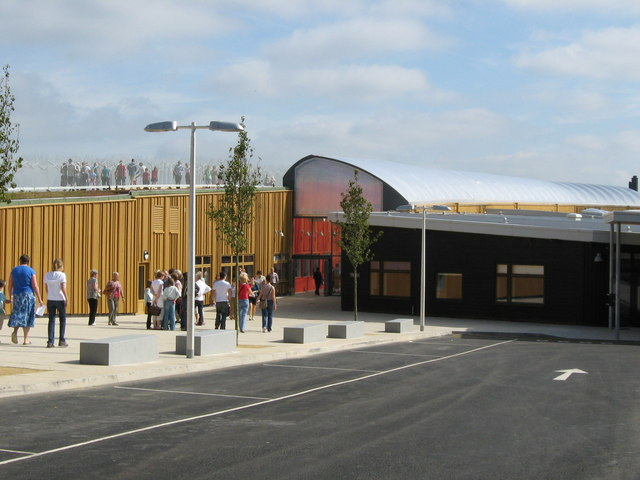
- Main entrance

Location
- Redland Court Road; Bristol, BS6 7EH; England; 51.4734°N 2.6023°W

Information
- Type: Secondary Academy
- Motto: Respect, Ambition, Responsibility
- Established: 2006; 20 years ago
- Local authority: Bristol City Council
- Trust: Excalibur Academies Trust
- Department for Education URN: 138855 Tables
- Ofsted: Reports
- Headteacher: Ben Houghton
- Gender: Mixed
- Age: 11 to 16
- Enrolment: 1,395
- Capacity: 1,395
- Houses: Ducks, Geese, Larks, Warblers
- Colours: Cyan, Blue
- Website: www.redlandgreen.excalibur.org.uk

Redland Green School (RGS) is a secondary school in Bristol, England, with a sixth form. It has facilities for 1400 students aged 11 to 16, 450 post 16 students, and facilities for 50 students with learning difficulties in its partner school Claremont Secondary School. The school is part of the Excalibur Academies Trust. and the North Bristol Post 16 Centre.

== History ==
The school was built in 2006 at a cost of £36 million: nearly £6 million higher than the original budget. After the overspend the Bristol Evening Post stated "Spending rules on major city council projects are being tightened up to try to ensure blunders such as at Redland Green School are never repeated".

There were several suggestions for the name of the school. These included Paul Dirac, which was portrayed in the local press as the probable name for the school. Previously the school was known as New North Bristol School.

In September 2015 it was announced that a number of new buildings would be constructed to increase the size of the school and its capacity. In September 2016 the intake at year 7 level increased from 189 pupils to 216, making it an eight-form entry.

== Location ==
The school is located on Redland Court Road, in the ward of Redland.

=== Catchment area ===
The effective catchment area of the school is small as a result of its continuing popularity. For the 2016 intake the furthest distance from the school that places were offered to children in the 'area of first priority' was 1.145 km. In 2015 it was 0.832 km, in 2014 it was 1.137 km, in 2013 it was 1.491 km and in 2012 1.271 km.

== Post 16 Centre ==
The school's Sixth Form, North Bristol Post 16 Centre, opened in September 2007. It is made up of two 'learning communities', at Redland Green, and at Cotham School. It is the sixth form for both schools, as well as its feeder schools: Fairfield School, Henbury School, Orchard School Bristol, and Oasis Academy Brightstowe. It also accepts a limited number of applicants from other schools.

== See also ==
- List of schools in Bristol
- North Bristol Post 16 Centre
