= John Tidmarsh =

British broadcaster and journalist (1928–2019)

John Tidmarsh OBE
- Born: 13 August 1928; Camberwell, London, England
- Died: 30 May 2019 (aged 90); Bexhill-on-Sea, East Sussex, England
- Education: Cotham School
- Occupation: Broadcaster • journalist
- Employer: Western Daily Press • BBC
- Partner: Anne Lount
- Children: 2

John Alan Tidmarsh OBE (13 August 1928 – 30 May 2019) was a British broadcaster and journalist who spent ten years with domestic radio and television and more than thirty years with the BBC World Service magazine programme Outlook.

== Biography ==
Tidmarsh was born in 1928 in Camberwell, an area of South London.

An evacuee during the early years of the Second World War, Tidmarsh went to three different grammar schools before joining his parents in Bristol for his final school years at Cotham Grammar School. He left school at 16 to become a junior reporter with the Western Daily Press. At 18 he left to do two years of National Service and spoke into a microphone for the first time when he became a radio operator in the Royal Air Force (RAF), serving one year at RAF Seletar in Singapore.

Back in Bristol with the Western Daily Press in the autumn of 1948, Tidmarsh began to specialise in sport, reporting each week on Bristol Rovers. After doing a "live" commentary one Saturday for the newly created Hospital Radio Service, the BBC Controller in West Region, the former war correspondent Frank Gillard, offered him a job, initially as a resident freelance, reporting and presenting the regional magazine The Week in the West. He later joined the staff as the regional organiser of coverage for national television news.

After four years in Bristol, Tidmarsh was invited to join the reporting staff at Broadcasting House in London and within two months was sent on a four-month assignment at the United Nations in New York.

Back in England, Tidmarsh worked at Alexandra Palace, the headquarters of BBC Television News, and presented the daily news magazine for South East England, Town and Around. Occasionally he presented the national news and later joined Gerald Priestland to present the first ever two-handed news presentation, which was on the newly created BBC2.

For most of his remaining years on the staff he worked out of Broadcasting House, where from time to time he stood in for Jack de Manio, presenting the popular Today programme. Most of the time he was reporting on foreign news, often in France during the crisis over Charles de Gaulle and independence for Algeria. He covered the final talks for Algerian independence at Évian-les-Bains and was actually in Algiers on Independence Day.

Tidmarsh had many more overseas assignments, including the revolt in Lebanon in June 1958 to overthrow Camille Chamoun, the two wars between India and Pakistan in 1962 and 1965, a three-month assignment in Vietnam in 1965, and the 1965 Selma to Montgomery marches, led by Martin Luther King Jr., in the United States.

In 1966, Tidmarsh resigned from the staff and set himself up as a correspondent for the BBC in Brussels (a "stringer"). From there he flew to London every Thursday morning, back again on Friday night, after presenting Outlook, a new current affairs and magazine programme which he had been asked to join on BBC World Service. He thus became the BBC's first European commuter, before returning to Britain in 1968.

Traditionalists said that Outlook would not last six months. The formula was all wrong, particularly with the inclusion of star guests "live" in the studio. When John finally retired in 1998, shortly after his 70th birthday, he had been with the programme for more than 30 years. For much of that time he took over three days a week and, as the senior presenter, made many special editions from every continent except Antarctica.

Tidmarsh was made an Officer of the Order of the British Empire for services to broadcasting in 1997, the same year he signed off from regular presenting. His autobiography was published in 2010, entitled Horrid Go-ahead Boy: A Broadcaster's Life.

Tidmarsh died on 30 May 2019 at the age of 90 and was survived by his partner Anne Lount, and two children, Patrick and Emma.
