= John Payne Ltd =

- Company type: Private company
- Industry: Shipbuilding, Towage Shipowner, millwright, engineer, iron founder, steam boiler maker
- Founded: 1859
- Defunct: 1925
- Fate: Closed
- Successor: Site taken over by Bristol Metal Spraying & Welding Company
- Headquarters: River Avon, Bristol, UK
- Key people: John Payne Snr. (founder), John Payne Jnr. (son), Amelia Payne, John Towers, Harry Payne

John Payne Ltd was a shipbuilder in Bristol, England, who built coastal colliers and cargo ships, and small craft such as tugs, during the 19th and 20th centuries.

== History ==
=== Origins ===
In around 1850, John Payne established himself as a millwright, engineer, iron founder and steam boiler maker, inland from the River Avon at Tower Hill in Bristol. In 1859, he branched out into shipbuilding, a natural expansion of his marine business, firstly completing the Jane, a small wooden steam tug. This had to be launched into Bristol Harbour after transportation by truck, and she was used by the company to tow barges with machinery from the wharf near the workshops. Her small size once enabled her to save the crew of a stricken barque in Bristol Harbour. The company built three wooden tugs at Tower Hill, likely including the diminutive 11 t Merrimac, and later built up the towing fleet over a number of years.

=== Expansion ===
Following some initial success with wooden-hulled tugs, in 1862 John Payne acquired the former Acraman Yard in Bedminster in order to build iron vessels. A number of these ships were fitted with steam engines built in his own foundry in Tower Hill. The first iron tug was the Emma of 1862, and several new construction orders followed for several iron-hulled vessels for local operators. In 1864 the company moved away from the traditional tug building business and built the first coastal collier, the Isca a sloop-rigged steamer of 65 t.

Having built in iron for some years, an experimental composite-hulled design was built in 1865, the 77-foot (23 m) Cardiff Castle, a paddle steamer tug of 62 t, later converted to a yacht in 1880 with an unusual dandy rig and wrecked on Cardiff Grounds on 15 April 1897. The same year the Kate was completed, and these were the first paddle vessels built at the Acraman's Yard by John Payne. The Kate was a double-ended design which later operated from Penarth beach.

The Harlequin of 1868 was the first tug design with twin screws, which provided superior towage control and had advanced engine arrangements for their day. The same year, John Payne completed two river steamers for Brazil, the Corruipe and Mondahu, steel twin-screw vessels of 200 t and the largest vessels yet built by the yard. These appear to have been the companies only exports. The steamer Henry Allen, completed in 1874, was even larger at 225t.

=== A new chairman ===
In 1880, John Payne Snr. died, and his son also called John took over the running of the firm. By the close of the decade the first steel-hulled vessel was built, the steamer Teal of 131 t and launched in 1889, although the company continued to also build in iron until 1893. Under John Payne Jnr.'s leadership the company continued to build a steady stream of cargo ships, tugs and a barge Bristol Safe, later rebuilt in 1912 to be the 129 t twin-screw ketch-rigged steamer Garthavon.

=== Lean years ===
Things changed in 1910 when John Payne Jnr. died, leaving the company to be run by Mrs. Amelia Payne, who set up a limited company as John Payne Ltd, to run both the shipyard and towage business. The tug Bristol Scout was the only order before World War I, when three of the company's tugs were requisitioned by the Port Examination Service, with the larger John Payne seeing service in the Dardanelles in Turkey. A large tug of 134t was ordered by the Admiralty late in the war, and was completed after the armistice as the West Winch and bought by the company. Both the John Payne and West Winch were later sold to C.J. Kings, who operated a fleet of tugs from Avonmouth.

=== James Towers Shipbuilding Company ===
With new orders in the early 1920s for two large coasting vessels, the company was sold to new owners James Towers Shipbuilding Co. in 1924. These vessels, the largest built by John Payne, were completed that year, with the Reedham being the largest at 483 t. The steel cargo ships were later sold to Coast Lines Ltd. and the other to an operator in Canada.

Unfortunately the new owners joined the industry at the wrong time, as the post-war depression hit the area quite badly, and in 1925 the yard closed itself to shipbuilding, and was reopened by Harry Payne as the factory for Bristol Metal Spraying and Welding Company.

=== John Payne built vessels ===
The company built more than 40 vessels. Known ships include:

Coastal colliers and cargo ships

- Isca (1864), 65t iron steam screw sloop
- Enid (1867), 88t iron steam screw sloop
- Monmouth (1869), 65t iron steam screw sloop
- Ethel (1870), 100t iron steam screw sloop
- Pendragon (1870), 59t iron steam screw sloop
- Henry Allen (1874), 225t iron steam twin-screw schooner
- Ibis (1881), 169t iron steam schooner
- Teal (1889), 131t steel steam screw ketch
- Reedham (1924), 483t steel screw steamer
- Smitham (1924), 447t steel screw steamer

River steamers

- Corruipe (1868), 200t iron twin-screw river steamer
- Mondahu (1868), 200t iron twin-screw river steamer

Coastal and harbour tugs

- Jane (1859), 27t wooden steam screw tug
- Emma (1862), 22t iron steam screw tug
- Kate (1865), 30t iron steam paddle sloop-rigged tug
- Cardiff Castle (1865), 62t composite steam paddle dandy-rigged tug
- Dolphin (1866), 42t iron steam screw tug
- Harlequin (1868), 58t iron steam twin-screw tug
- Leo (1871), 95t iron steam paddle tug
- Merlin (1871), 19t iron steam paddle tug
- Oberon (1871), 56t iron steam screw sloop-rigged tug
- Queen Mab (1872), 48t iron steam screw tug
- Star (1875), 40t wooden steam screw tug
- Oberon (1876), 56t iron steam twin-screw tug
- Elf (1876), 53t wooden steam screw tug
- Kimberley (1878), 54t iron steam screw tug
- Fawn (1878), 29t iron steam screw tug
- Stag (1883), 41t iron steam screw tug
- Columbine (1886), 60t iron steam screw tug
- Staghound (1892), 39t iron steam screw tug
- Antelope (1893), 36t iron steam screw tug
- Brunel (1895), 36t steel steam screw tug
- Cabot (1899), 61t steel steam screw tug
- Gazelle (1901), 57t steel steam screw tug
- Contract (1907), 38t steel steam screw tug
- John Payne (1909), 145t steel steam screw tug
- Bristol Scout (1911), 54t steel steam screw tug
- West Winch (1920), 134t steel steam screw tug

Barges

- Bristol Safe (1904), 106t steel barge

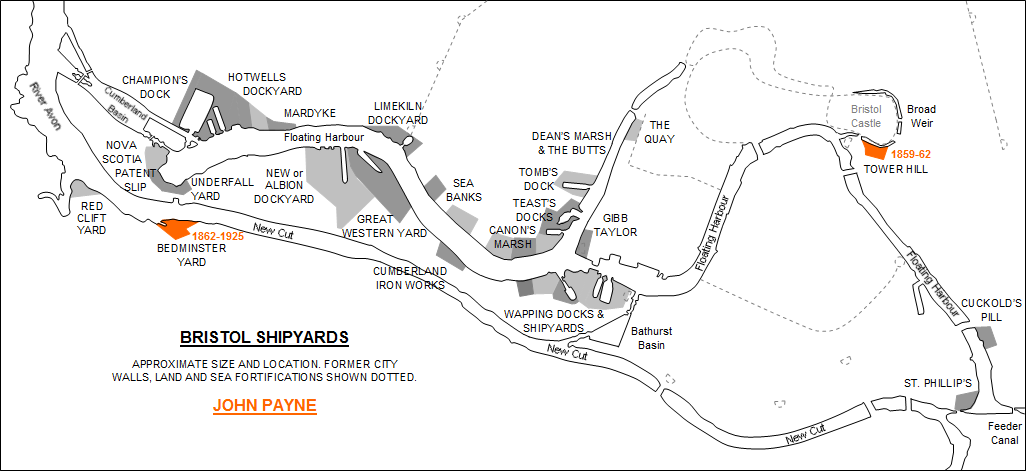
Bristol Shipyards with the various locations of John Payne and later John Towers Shipbuilding Co. highlighted.
