= Bedminster Town Hall =

Municipal building in Bedminster, Bristol, England

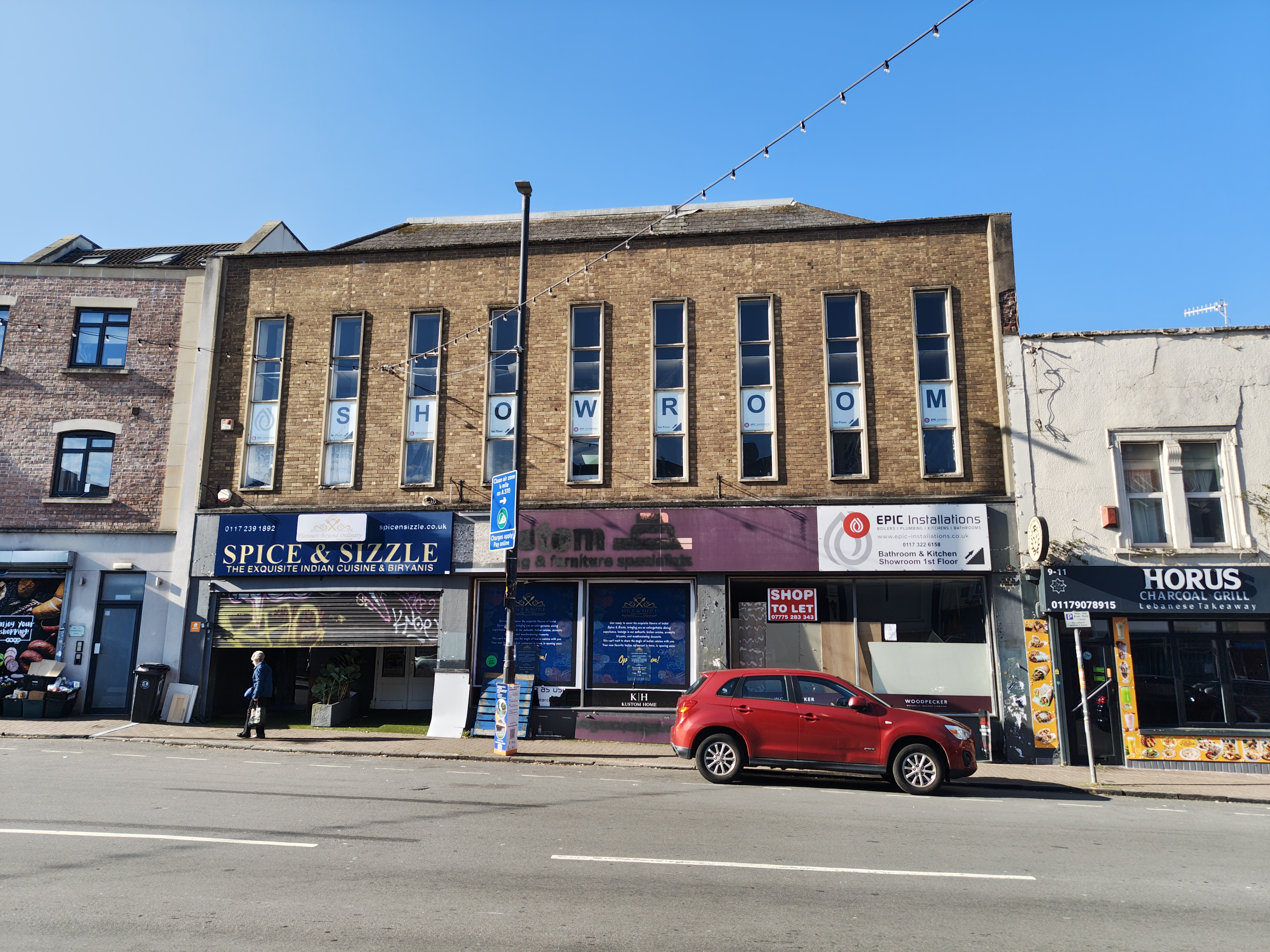
- The building, in 2025

- Shown in Bristol
- 51.4410°N 2.6014°W
- Location: Cannon Street, Bedminster

History
- Built: 1891

Site notes
- Architectural style: Italianate style

Bedminster Town Hall is a former events venue in Cannon Street in Bedminster, a suburb of Bristol in England. The building is currently in use as a furniture shop.

== History ==
In the late 19th century, a group of local businessmen decided to form a company, to be known as the Bedminster Town Hall Company, to finance and commission a new public hall for the parish. The site they selected was on the southwest side of Cannon Street.

The new building was designed in the Italianate style, built in brick at a cost of nearly £6,000 and was completed in 1891. The design involved a symmetrical main frontage of four bays facing onto Cannon Street. The central two bays on the ground floor featured round headed openings flanked by half-height columns with imposts supporting architraves. The outer bays on the ground floor and all the bays on the first floor were fenestrated by bi-partite round headed windows with tracery. There were pilasters separating the bays on the first floor and, at roof level, there was a modillioned cornice. Internally, the principal room was the main hall which was 67 feet (20 m) long and 51 feet (16 m) wide. It had seating for 750 people on the ground floor, 450 in the gallery, and standing room for another 350 people. An adjoining building, erected at the same time, housed a liberal club.

The building was extensively used as a venue for concerts hosted by the Bristol South Musical Society. Performers included the contralto, Dame Clara Butt, who appeared in April 1893 and again in December 1894. However, the venture was not financially successful and the company which had developed the building was wound up in 1898. In 1909, the building was leased to the cinema pioneer, Ralph Pringle, who converted it into a cinema. It remained an independent cinema until 1954, when it was closed and was converted into a shopping mall. It was officially reopened as the "Bedminster Shopping Hall" on 11 February 1954. It was described two years later in the Estates Gazette as a "unique arcade" with "28 shops".

The façade was later rebuilt in the modern style with a shop front on the ground floor and a series of nine tall casement windows on the first floor. By the early 21st century, it accommodated a furniture store, trading since around 2001 as Bedmaker, and since around 2009, as Kustom Floors.
