= Outlook (radio programme) =

Radio programme produced by BBC World Service

- Genre: Human Interest and factual
- Country of origin: United Kingdom
- Language: English
- Home station: BBC World Service
- Hosted by: Jo Fidgen, Mobeen Azhar, Asya Fouks, Saskia Collette and others
- Edited by: Munazza Khan
- Recording studio: Broadcasting House
- Original release: 4 July 1966
- Website: Outlook
- Podcast: Outlook Podcast Archives (2006-2016)

Outlook is a radio programme on BBC World Service that broadcasts human interest stories from across the globe. It broadcasts from Monday to Friday from 1206 to 1250 GMT.

== History ==
This programme was first broadcast on 4 July 1966 by BBC. It began as a straightforward magazine programme and was presented for more than thirty years by John Tidmarsh. More recently, it has been praised for a consistent ability to uncover fascinating stories. It was credited with bringing solace to Terry Waite after his abduction by Islamic extremists in Beirut in 1987.

Corruption of any kind is a favourite topic on the show and it has achieved recognition for its high production values alongside other BBC radio programmes.

The programme previously had a weekend edition titled Outlook Weekend which formerly aired on Saturdays from 2332 to 2359 GMT. It has since been replaced by an extra weekday edition of Outlook on Fridays starting on 5 April 2024 known as the Outlook Mixtape.

== Presenters ==
The first presenters were former BBC war correspondent Bob Reid, John Tidmarsh and Colin Hamilton. Other regular presenters have included John McCarthy, Barbara Myers, John Waite, Mike Bullen, Janet Trewin, Frank Partridge, Caroline Wyatt, Frederick Dove (between 1997 and 2008), Heather Payton, George Arney, Lucy Ash, Rajan Datar and Matthew Bannister (between 2008 and 2018). As of November 2024, it is presented by Jo Fidgen, Asya Fouks, Mobeen Azhar, India Rakusen and Emily Webb from BBC Broadcasting House in London.

In June 2020, Abdulmalik Fahd and Helen Oyibo were listed as presenters based in Lagos, Nigeria.

== Producers ==
Although presenters are more publicly visible, Outlook has been shaped by a number of notable producers and journalists over the years.

Sallyann J. Murphey worked as a producer on Outlook early in her career before moving into senior roles within the BBC and later television production.

Vibeke Venema is a journalist and producer who has worked extensively on Outlook, contributing to its reputation for intimate and globally diverse storytelling.

Andrea Rangecroft has produced reports and programmes for Outlook alongside other BBC World Service documentary output.

Beatrice Guzzardi has been involved in production and digital journalism for the programme, helping adapt its storytelling for online and podcast audiences.

Peter Shevlin was a producer for Outlook between 2006 and 2008 and went on to win the AIB for journalism with Larry Madowo in 2019 for 'Raha: The Joy of the Train'. Raha: The Joy of the Train

== Past theme music ==
Throughout the 1970s and 1980s its theme music was "The Hellraisers" by Syd Dale.
