= Yann Thomas =

English rugby union player

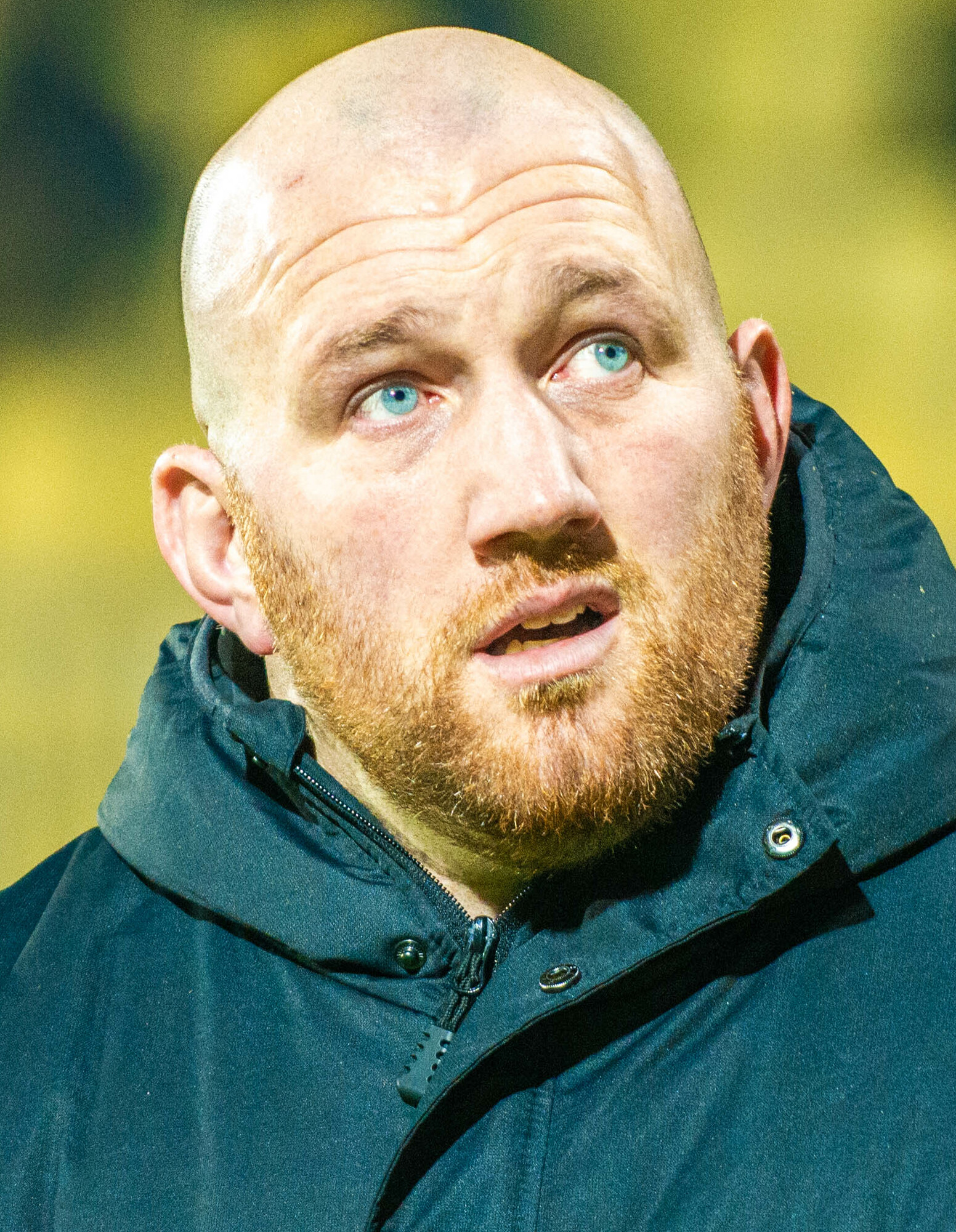
- Born: 16 April 1990 (age 36) Bristol, England
- Height: 1.88 m (6 ft 2 in)
- Weight: 120 kg (18 st 13 lb; 265 lb)
- School: Ashton Park School
- Occupation: = retired

Rugby union career
- Position: Loosehead Prop
Senior career
Years	Team	Apps	(Points)
2009–2017	Gloucester	111	(10)
2017–2018	Rouen	17	(0)
2018–2025	Bristol Bears	100	(15)

Yann Thomas (born 16 April 1990) is a rugby union footballer, most recently playing in the Gallagher Premiership for Bristol RFC. He plays as a prop.

Thomas joined the Gloucester Rugby Academy from West Country rivals Bristol before the 2008–09 season and impressed enough to earn a senior deal.

Made his full senior debut for the club in the LV= Cup in 2009–10, and has also played as a dual-registered player for Moseley. On 2 April 2013, it was announced that Thomas had signed a two-year contract extension to keep him at Gloucester until the end of the 2014–15 season. On 25 April 2015, Thomas has agreed a new contract extension with Gloucester.

On 7 June 2017, after a nine-year stay with Gloucester, it was announced that Thomas has signed for third division French club Rouen in Federale 1 on a one-year contract, option for a further year. On 20 January 2018, Thomas moves back to England to join hometown club Bristol ahead of the 2018–19 season.
