= St John the Baptist, Bedminster =

Ruined Church in Bedminster, Bristol

Coordinates: 51.4400°N 2.5982°W

Church of St John the Baptist
- Church of St John the Baptist, Bedminster
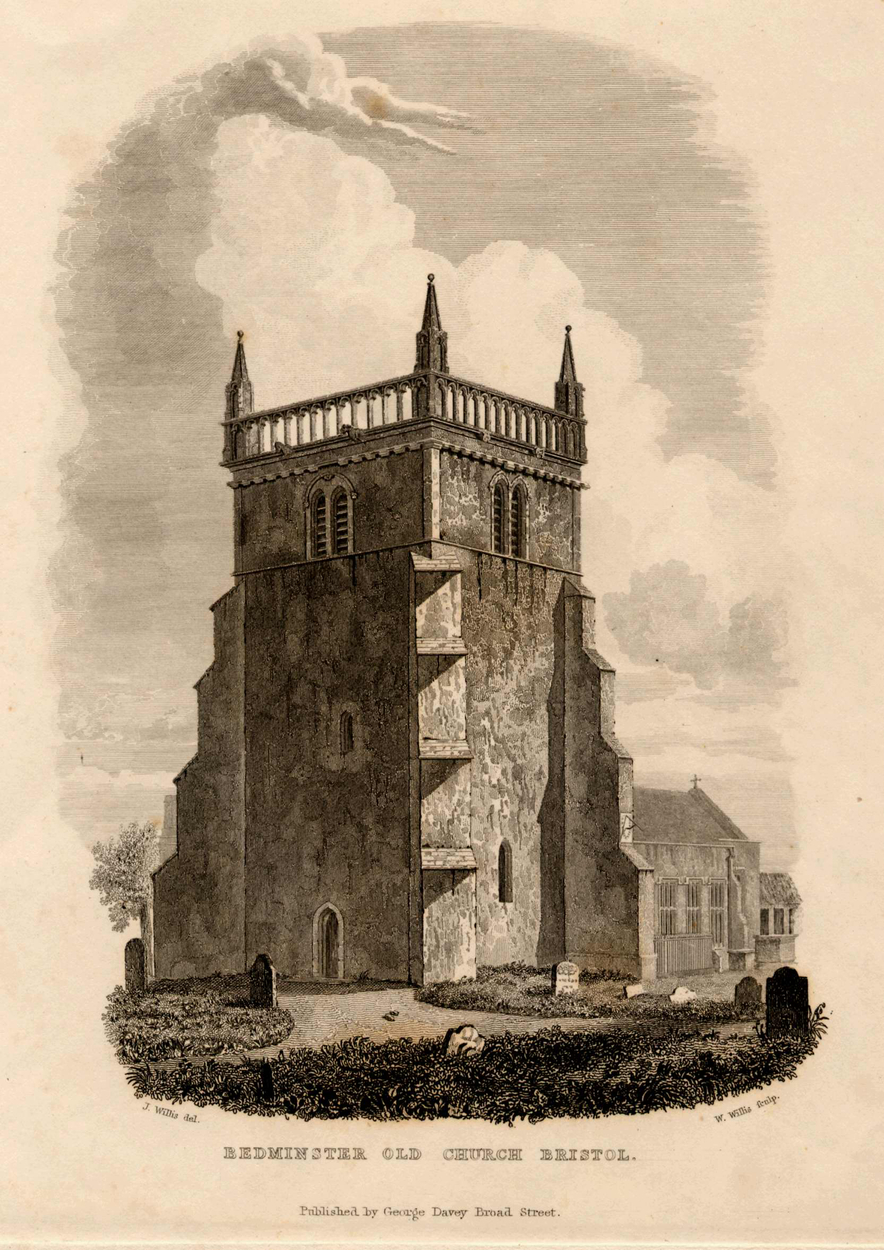
- The church before its destruction
- Location: Bedminster, Bristol
- Country: England
- Denomination: Anglican

History
- Founded: before 1003
- Dedicated: before 1003

Architecture
- Style: Gothic
- Years built: c. 1003; 1663; 1854–1855
- Closed: 1940
- Demolished: 1940 (Interior), 1967 (Exterior)

Administration
- Diocese: Diocese of Bristol

The Church of St John the Baptist was an Anglican Church located in Bedminster, Bristol. Built in 1003, it served as the parish church of Bedminster until its destruction during the Bristol Blitz in 1940, and its demolition in 1967. It was one of the city’s oldest churches.

== History ==
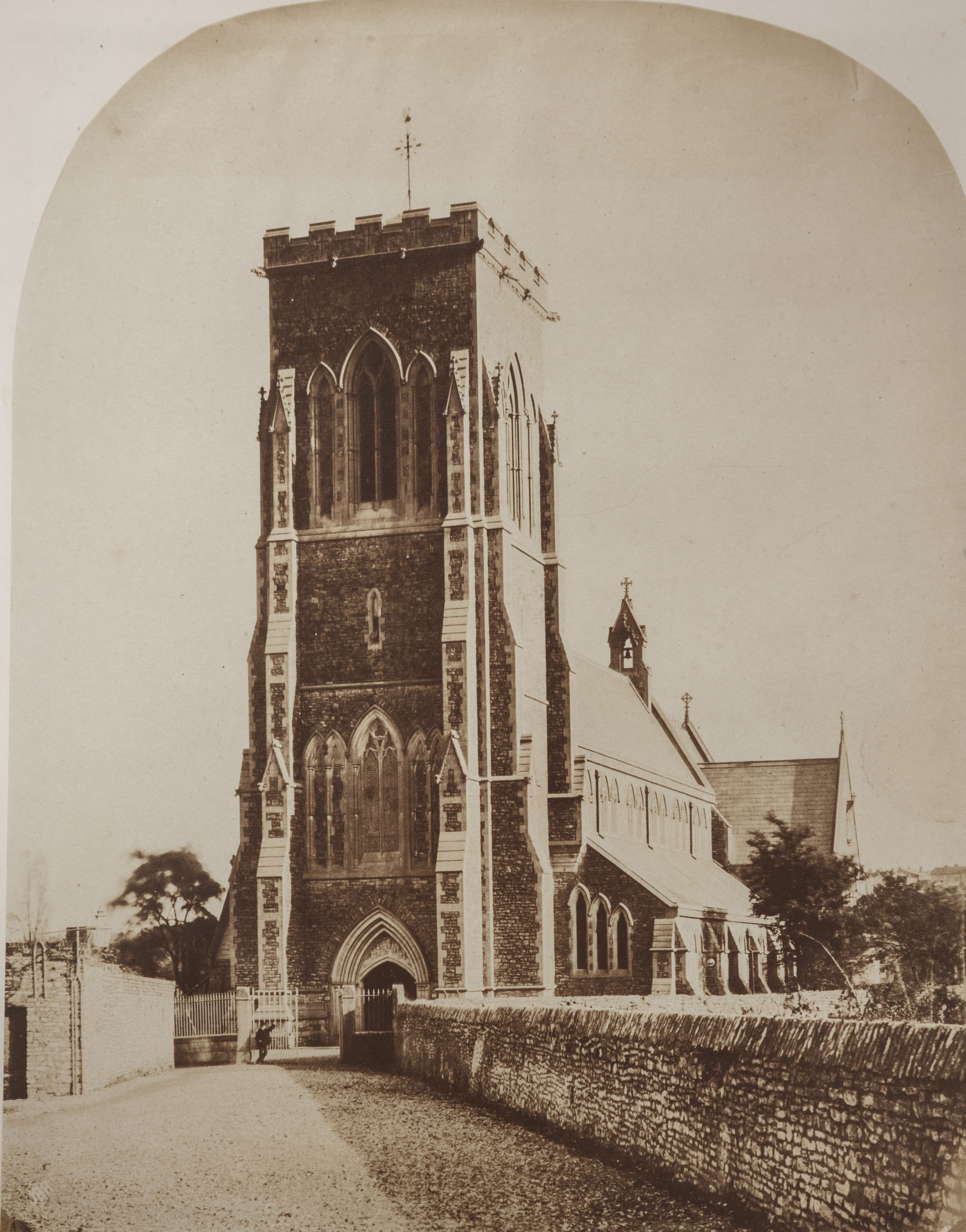
The church in 1854, before its 1855 reconstruction

The church was first attested in 1003, and was listed in the 1068 Domesday Book. Throughout the Middle Ages, it was the centre of the parish of Bedminster, and of the nearby St Mary Redcliffe, which was (at the time) a small chapel. In 1644, the church and Bedminster were sacked by Prince Rupert. In September 1645, Prince Rupert ordered that the church be burned down. It was rebuilt in 1663, and was rebuilt re-using the previous structure and was in a poor state. On 25 June 1854, the church was demolished in favour of building a more grand structure. The church was consecrated on 30 October 1855, although construction concluded earlier, and was the first church in Bristol to have a surpliced choir. On 24 November 1940, the church was gutted during the Bristol Blitz, with only the exterior walls surviving. For nearly 30 years the church stood in ruins before the City Council approved its demolition in 1967. The area where the church once stood is now a park.

== Architecture ==
The final church of St John the Baptist was a Gothic Revival building designed by the English architect John Norton and completed in 1855. Constructed in stone, it replaced an earlier seventeenth-century church while occupying the historic site of the medieval parish church. The building comprised a nave with aisles, a chancel, and a prominent western tower, reflecting the principles of the Victorian Gothic Revival movement.
