= John James (businessman and philanthropist) =

British businessman and philanthropist (1906 – 1996)

John James CBE
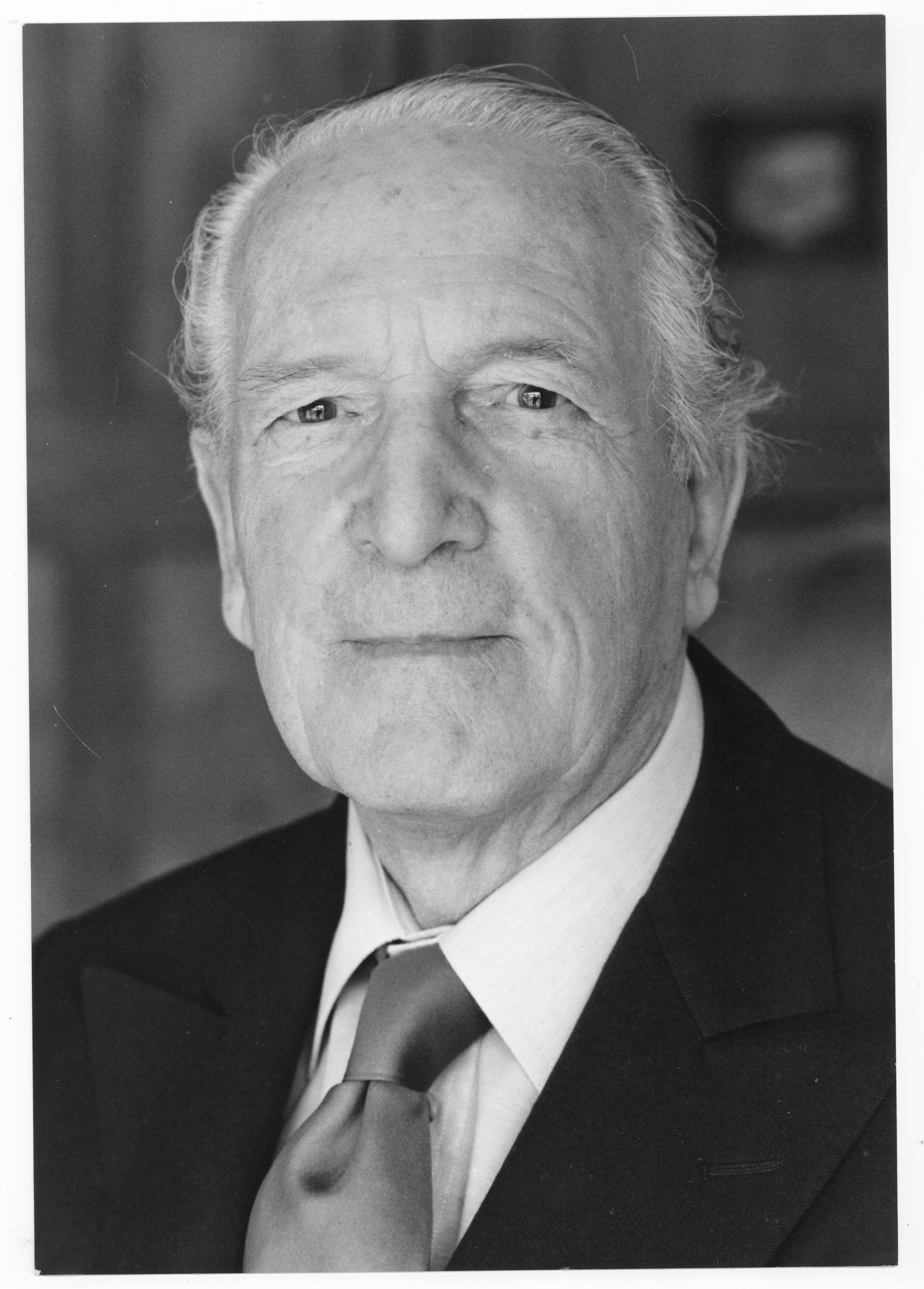
- Born: 25 July 1906; Bedminster, Bristol, England
- Died: 31 January 1996 (aged 89); Clifton, Bristol, England
- Spouse: Mollie Stevens (m. 1932–1971) Margaret Parkes (m.1972-1991)
- Children: 4
- Website: johnjames.org.uk

John James CBE (25 July 1906 – 31 January 1996) was an English businessman and philanthropist.

== Early life and education ==
James was born at 96 Philip Street, Bedminster, Bristol. In 1918, James won a scholarship to study at the Merchant Venturers' Technical College (now known as Cotham School where he excelled academically.

== Career ==
In 1923, he lied about his age to join the RAF and was posted to Malta where he developed his skills as a wireless operator. He had a brief spell as a salesman before he joined the Royal Aircraft Establishment in 1938 and became a Squadron Leader working on the development of radar at Farnborough during World War II.

On demob in 1946, he bought his first shop in Broadmead, Bristol and went on to develop the Broadmead Wireless Company. The company expanded rapidly and by 1952 there were 115 shops and 750 employees, having branched into television as well.

His management skills were commented on in Harry Miller's analysis of 21 post war British firms written for the Institute of Economic Affairs.

In 1957, James bought the John Murdoch chain of 90 shops. In December 1959, he sold the business to Charles Hayward's Firth Cleveland Industrial Holdings for £5.8 million.

The John James Group, a publicly quoted company, was set up in 1964 as a holding company for small companies in the South West, Midlands and South Wales concentrating on light engineering, building and manufacturing, including footwear. The group was sold in 1979 to Wolseley Hughes for £23.7 million.

James was also a member of Harlech Television which made a successful bid for Independent Television's contract for Wales and West in 1968.

== Philanthropy ==
James made numerous private donations and was actively involved in the Dawn James Charitable Foundation, a charity set up in 1966, following the death of one of his daughters. The most notable activity funded by the Foundation was the Bristol Old Folks' Festival which ran from 1963 to 1980 and provided a week of free entertainment for anyone over 70 within the greater Bristol area for a week during May.

In 1980, James donated £300,000 to Harefield Hospital to maintain their transplant programme and £500,000 to the creation of St Peter's Hospice in Bristol. In 1985, £1 million was donated to purchase the first MRI machine for Bristol at Frenchay Hospital and three years later, a further £1 million to buy a shock wave lithotripter machine for Southmead Hospital. £1 million donations were also made to purchase an ultra sound scanner for the ante natal clinic at Southmead and towards the creation of the new Bristol Children's Hospital.

Following the cessation of the direct grant scheme in 1976, he made significant donations to all of the ex direct grant schools in Bristol to provide bursaries or assisted places to enable children of similar backgrounds to his own to have the same start in life and he also provided funding for bursaries for the existing three independent schools. He challenged the ten comprehensive schools to raise up to £100,000 each which he would match to create enrichment funds to support worthwhile activities and develop the personal qualities of every pupil.

The John James Bristol Foundation was set up in December 1983 and following his death was merged with the Dawn James Charitable Foundation in 1998. Its main areas of philanthropy follow James' wishes and are the elderly, education and health.

== Honours and recognition ==
A five-part profile about James was published in the Bristol Evening Post under the banner 'Men of Fortune' by their London editor Don Hatwell in 1977. In 1974 his life was the subject of a BBC West programme 'The Quiet Millionaire', later shown on BBC Two as part of the 'Network' series. In 1981 he was awarded the CBE for services to charity and in 1983 awarded an Honorary Doctorate by the University of Bristol. In 1987 he became an Honorary Member of the Society of Merchant Venturers and in 1987 became the first Honorary Member of the Guild of Guardians.

In 1999 the readers of the Bristol Evening Post were invited to vote for the Person of the Century. James gained 59% of the votes, with his nearest rival only taking 5%. In 2006 a blue plaque was erected in his memory on the walls of Windmill Hill City Farm.
