= Kenny Stephens =

English footballer

Personal information
- Full name: Kenneth John Stephens
- Date of birth: 14 November 1946 (age 79)
- Place of birth: Bristol, England
- Position: Winger

Youth career
- Broad Plain
- Phildown Rovers
- 1962–1964: West Bromwich Albion

Senior career*
Years	Team	Apps	(Gls)
1964–1968	West Bromwich Albion	22	(2)
1968–1970	Walsall	7	(0)
1970–1977	Bristol Rovers	225	(11)
1977–1980	Hereford United	60	(2)
1982–?	Hanham Athletic		
Total		314	(15)

Managerial career
- Hanham Athletic
- * Club domestic league appearances and goals

Kenneth John Stephens (born 14 November 1946) is a former professional footballer, who played in 314 Football League games for West Bromwich Albion, Walsall, Bristol Rovers, and Hereford United.

== Career ==
Stephens began playing for Speedwell School in his home town of Bristol, before going on to play in the Bristol Downs League as a teenager.

He joined West Brom as an apprentice in 1962, before turning professional with them in 1964. He went on to play 22 League games for The Baggies, scoring twice. After playing seven games for Walsall, who he joined in 1968, he retired from football to become a newsagent in the West Midlands, but was tempted out of retirement to join his home town club Bristol Rovers in 1970. He went on to play in 225 League games for Rovers and scored eleven goals in a seven-year spell with the club. He ended his League career with Hereford United, for whom he made 60 appearances between 1977 and 1980, then made 35 appearances for Gloucester City in the Southern Football League before dropping down to non-League football to join Hanham Athletic in 1982. He later managed Hanham and also went on to become their chairman.
