= Kingsweston School =

Location
- Napier Miles Road and Penpole lane Bristol, BS11 0UT; BS11 0EB; England
- Coordinates: 51.4951°N 2.65822°W

Information
- Type: Community special school
- Motto: Learning together, achieving together
- Local authority: Bristol City Council
- Department for Education URN: 109386 Tables
- Ofsted: Reports
- Acting headteacher: Emma Richards
- Deputy Headteacher: Jordan Bool
- Gender: Coeducational
- Age: 4 to 19
- Enrolment: 209 as of February 2012
- Colour: Blue
- Website: http://www.kingsweston.bristol.sch.uk

Kingsweston School is a school for children with severe learning difficulties and Autism. It is located across 3 campuses in north west Bristol. The largest campus is located in an old manor near Lawrence Weston, in the City/County of Bristol. It is a rapidly expanding school, with three sites and caters to a wide range of pupils in both terms of age (Reception to post-16) and ability. It has a well-established autistic provision and is keen on strengthening the links with the wider community it already enjoys.

In 2014 Ofsted rated the school as Good.
