= Michael Parsons (engineer) =

Bridge designer (1928–2021)

Michael Francis Parsons (1928–2021) was a civil engineer who designed major elements of large suspension bridges including the Severn Bridge; Forth Road Bridge; Humber Bridge and Bosphorus Bridges.
