= Sallyann J. Murphey =

Sallyann J. Murphey is an author.

== Producer ==
At the age of 23 she became a producer for the BBC World Service, producing the current affairs program 24 Hours and the magazine program, Outlook. A year later, she moved over to BBC Radio 4 and was appointed a producer to their flagship news and current events program, The World At One. During her five-year tenure there, she rose to the position of program editor, specializing in the inner workings of Great Britain’s Labour Party and in the coverage of the United States. In 1982, she joined BBC1 Television as a news and current affairs producer, working on the daily evening news program, Nationwide, and then on the team who developed Britain’s first-ever morning show, Breakfast Time.

In 1984, Murphey was invited by ITV to establish their American news operation for Good Morning Britain, the then-sister program to Good Morning America. She moved to New York City in 1985, where she met her husband, photographer Greg Murphey, a year later. The couple moved to Chicago, Illinois at the end of her contract. Murphey continued to work as a British journalist, writing investigative features for the London Observer, the Daily Mail and IPC Magazines. She also served as contributing editor on The Chicago Times Magazine and was published in The Utne Reader.

== Writer ==
In 1991, she moved to Brown County, Indiana, where she wrote her first book, Bean Blossom Dreams - A City Family’s Search for a Simple Country Life, which was published by William Morrow in 1994. The book received national acclaim and, a year later, she was selected to write the first work of original fiction ever commissioned by Hallmark and Better Homes and Gardens, who published her short story, "Emma’s Christmas Wish," in 1996. Indiana University Press will be publishing an updated edition of Bean Blossom Dreams in Spring 2008.

Two years later, Putnam Berkley published The Zen of Food - a Philosophy of Nourishment, a collection of essays which uses our attitudes to food as a metaphor for our attitudes to life. Murphey’s work, The Metcalfe Family Album - Six Generations of Traditions and Memories, was published by Chronicle Books in 1999. Nominally a work of fiction in which six generations of women from the same family keep a record of their lives, it is tightly tied to American & Indiana history from 1835 to 1996.

Ms Murphey has appeared on Oprah, Good Morning America, and National Public Radio.
