= North Bristol Post 16 Centre =

Sixth Form College in Bristol, England

Location
- Bristol; England; 51.46495°N 2.59988°W

Information
- Type: Community
- Established: 2007
- Local authority: City of Bristol
- Department for Education URN: 135589 Tables
- Gender: Coeducational
- Age: 16 to 19
- Website: http://www.nbp16c.org.uk/

North Bristol Post 16 Centre is a Sixth Form centre in Bristol, England. It is made up of two 'learning communities' at Cotham School and at Redland Green School. It opened in September 2007, one year after Redland Green School opened for Year 7 pupils. It is the sixth form for both schools, as well as its partner schools: Fairfield School, Henbury School, Orchard School Bristol, and Oasis Academy Brightstowe. It also accepts applicants from other schools across the wider Bristol area.

== Learning communities ==
Pupils choose at the start of Year 12 to be based at either Cotham, or Redland Green. Each has its own 'student services team' which aims to look after the welfare of pupils, and each community is led by an assistant headteacher. Pupils are both students of the centre and pupils of the school they choose as their learning community.
