= Bristol Gateway School =

Location
- Long Cross; Lawrence Weston; Bristol, BS11 0QA; England
- 51.5039°N 2.6566°W

Information
- Type: Special school; Academy
- Established: 2001
- Local authority: Bristol City Council
- Trust: North Star Academy Trust
- Department for Education URN: 148322 Tables
- Ofsted: Reports
- Head: Kaye Palmer-Greene
- Gender: Mixed
- Age: 11 to 19
- Enrolment: 80
- Capacity: 80

Bristol Gateway School is a special needs school located in Lawrence Weston, Bristol, England. The head teacher is Kaye Palmer-Green. The school used to be located in St Werburghs, but moved to Lawrence Weston due to growing demand. The school offers GCSEs like mainstream schools in Bristol.

The school is an EBSD/ASD school for pupils with emotional, behavioural and social difficulties. The school was assessed as needing improvement, however by 2015 it was rated as good.

In 2014 the school was awarded the Youth Sports Trust Goldmark Partner Status Award.

Previously a community school administered by Bristol City Council, in January 2021 Bristol Gateway School converted to academy status. The school is now sponsored by the North Star Academy Trust.
