= Russell Wood (cricketer) =

English cricketer

Personal information
- Full name: Russell Brown Wood
- Born: 15 December 1929; Bristol, England
- Died: 1 July 2015 (aged 85)
- Batting: Right-handed
- Role: Wicket-keeper

Domestic team information
- Years: Team
- 1950–1951: Gloucestershire

Career statistics
Competition	First-class
Matches	8
Runs scored	110
Batting average	12.22
100s/50s	–/–
Top score	48
Balls bowled	144
Wickets	–
Bowling average	–
5 wickets in innings	–
10 wickets in match	–
Best bowling	–
Catches/stumpings	1/1
- Source: Cricinfo, 30 July 2011

Russell Brown "Rusty" Wood (12 December 1929 – 1 July 2015) was an English cricketer. Wood was a right-handed batsman who fielded as a wicket-keeper. He was born in Bristol.

Wood made his first-class debut for Gloucestershire against Cambridge University in 1950. He made 7 further first-class appearances, the last of which came against Glamorgan in the 1951 County Championship. In his 8 first-class matches, he scored 110 runs at an average of 12.22, with a high score of 48. This score came on debut against Cambridge University in 1950.

He died on 1 July 2015.
