= Bridge Learning Campus =

Location
- William Jessop Way; Bristol, BS13 0RL; England; 51.4071°N 2.5907°W

Information
- Type: Academy
- Established: 1958
- Trust: Trust in Learning
- Department for Education URN: 139049 Tables
- Ofsted: Reports
- Chief Executive: Mark Davies
- Gender: Mixed
- Age: 3 to 16
- Enrolment: 1006 (Data from January 2016)
- Capacity: 1395 (Data from January 2016)
- Houses: Redcliffe, Pero, Temple, Clifton
- Colours: Red, Yellow, Green, Blue
- Website: http://www.bridgelearningcampus.org.uk

Bridge Learning Campus is a mixed gender all-through school located in the Whitchurch Park area of Bristol, England.

== History ==
Its construction was completed in December 2008, opening to students the following January. It was officially opened by The Princess Royal in October 2009. BLC, as an all through school, enjoys a rare identity as one of only a handful of schools in the UK where a child can begin and end their entire school career within the same establishment. There are many potential benefits to this approach, both operationally for the school and ultimately for the educational progress of the pupils.

BLC has incorporated the secondary school formerly known as Hartcliffe Engineering Community College, and also the former Teyfant Community Primary School. BLC (or "The Bridge" as it has become known) has been constructed as part of the former Labour Government's Building Schools for the Future programme (since scrapped). Additionally, New Fosseway Special School also re-located to the new site in 2009, joining the campus organisation.

One of the key drivers for the establishment of BLC is the need to improve educational standards in the Hartcliffe area, particularly at secondary school levels. There is little doubt that standards have increased for the school, as GCSE results have risen year-on-year for Bridge Learning Campus Secondary since 2005.

The staff within the new campus are determined to innovate. There is still a distinction between the primary and secondary areas of the campus, however due to an introduction of a phasing system, pupils are no longer educated based on their age. Rather, pupils in all phases will be in classes based on their ability. The adoption of this phasing system has been recognised by Ofsted in their most recent inspection of the secondary phases as a positive development, and also during a visit by former Secretary of State Ed Balls.

The original Hartcliffe School was built in the late 1950s and was home to over 2200 students on the site now occupied by BLC. The original school was built to serve new housing which replaced bomb damaged properties during the post-World War II period and at the time it was one of the largest schools in the country. The original buildings have since been demolished as part of the rebuild.

== Future ==
It was proposed to convert to an academy on 1 November 2012. This was pushed back to 1 December 2012, followed by 1 January 2013, then 1 February 2013, then again until 1 March 2013.
