= City Academy Bristol =

The City Academy Bristol

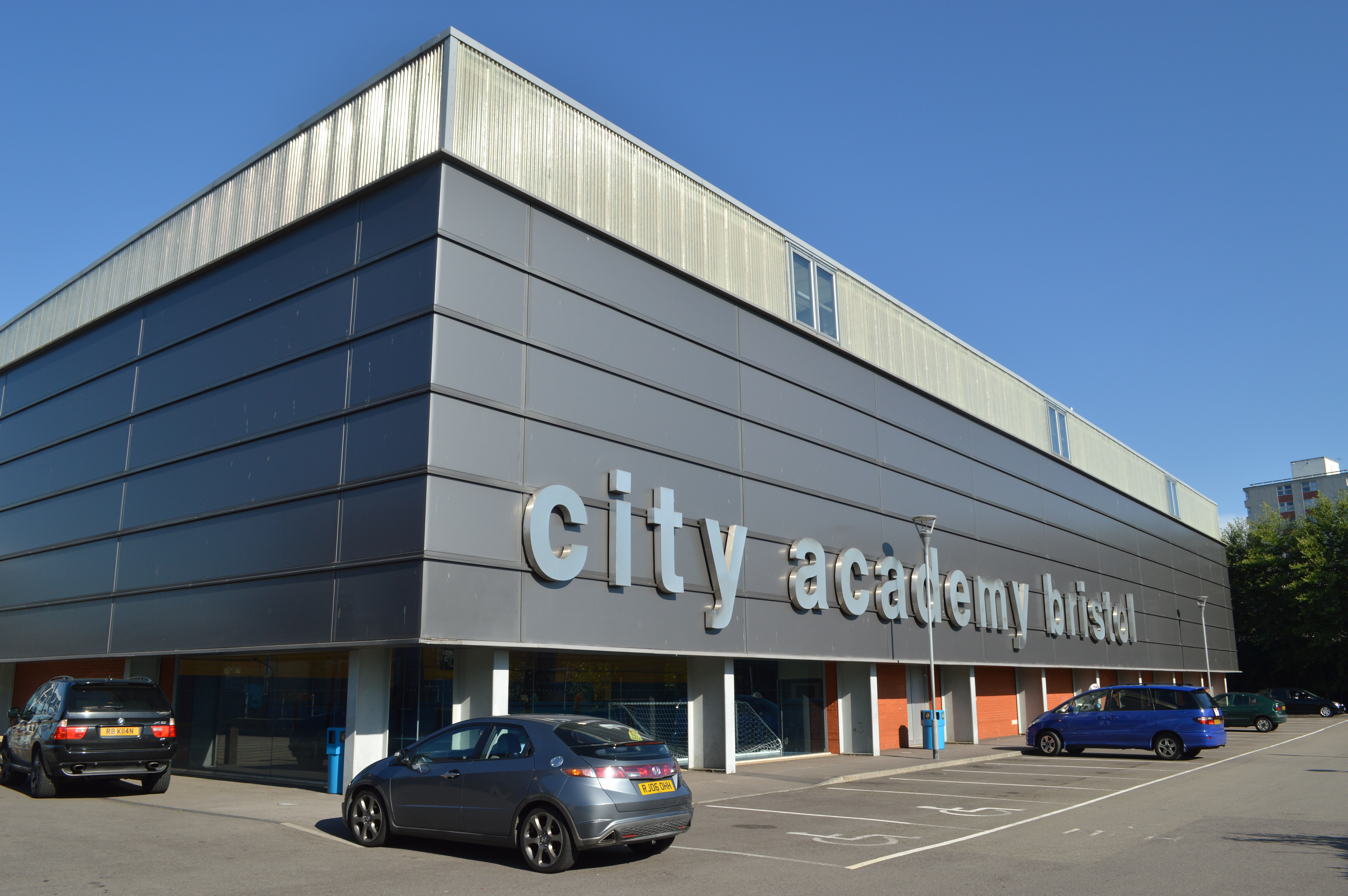

Location
- Russell Town Avenue; Bristol, BS5 9JH; England; 51.4602°N 2.5624°W

Information
- Type: Secondary Academy
- Established: 2003
- Trust: Cabot Learning Federation
- Department for Education URN: 144509 Tables
- Ofsted: Reports
- Principal: Ben Tucker
- Gender: Mixed
- Age: 11 to 16
- Enrollment: 992 (as of 2024)
- Website: cityacademybristol.clf.uk

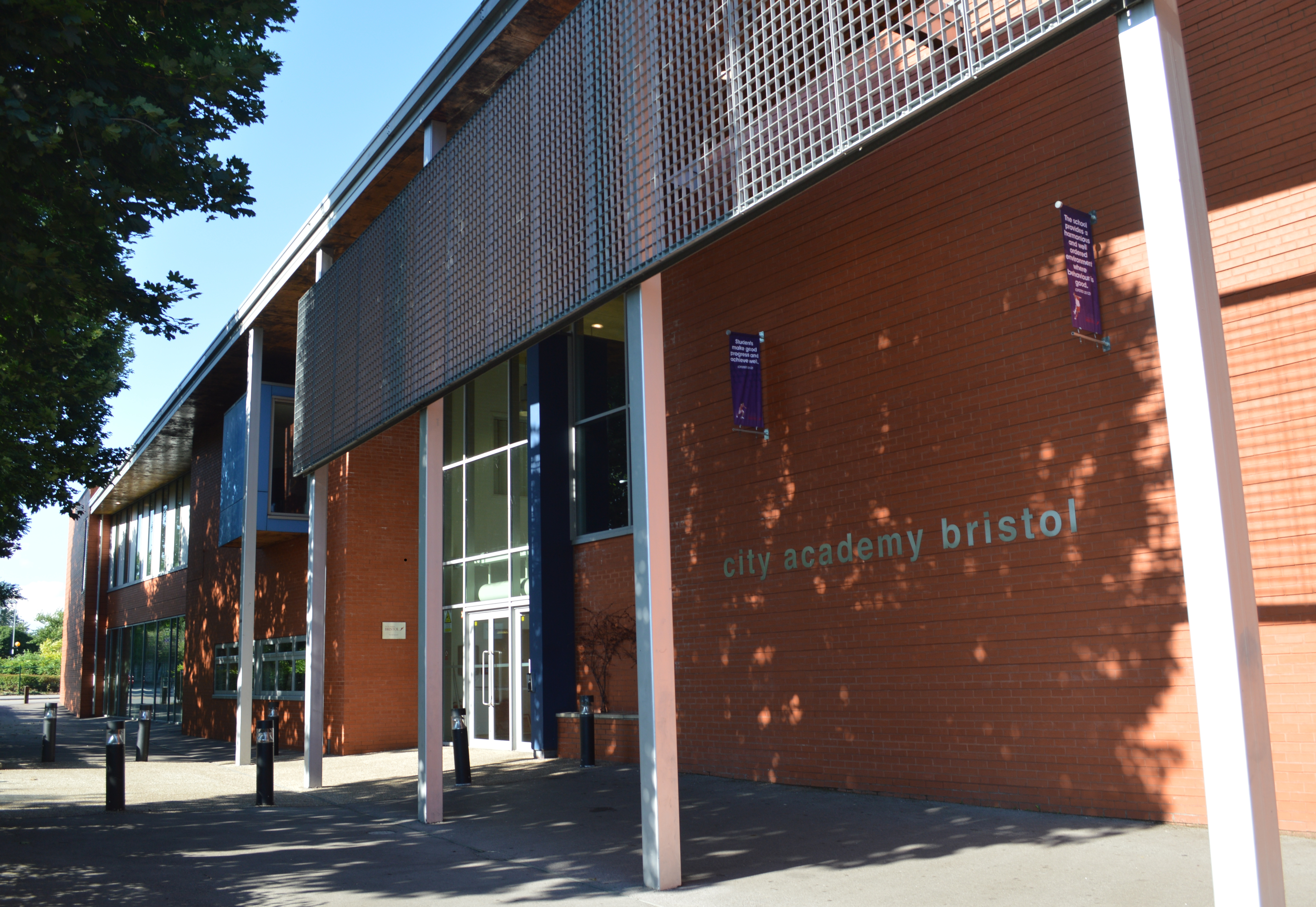
Main building

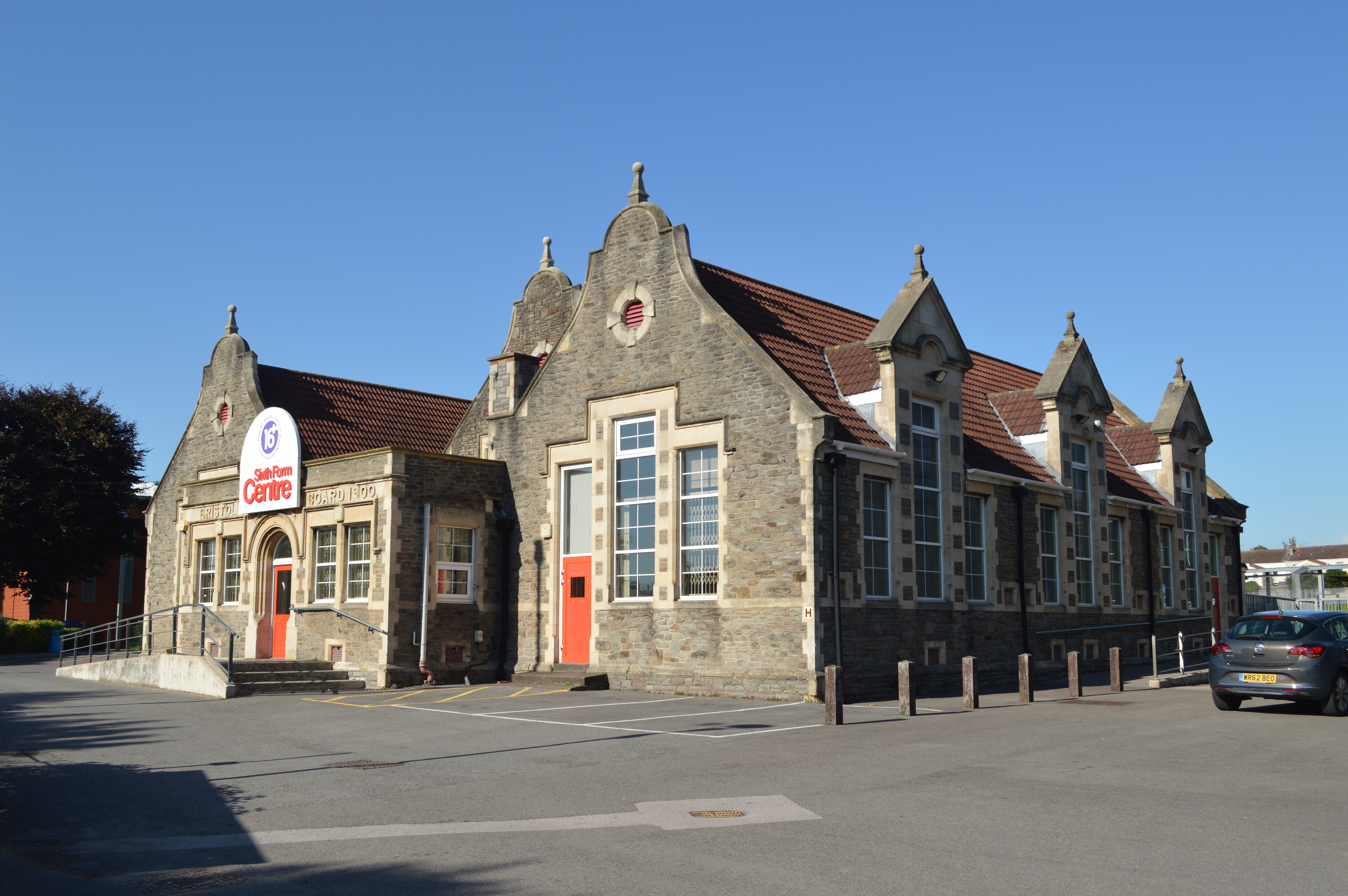
Sixth form centre

The City Academy Bristol is a mixed gender secondary school with Academy status, located in the Easton area of Bristol, England.

== History ==
The school opened in September 2003. It formed part of the Labour government's scheme for schools in deprived areas, and was the first Academy in South West England.

Built on the site of St George Community College which closed in 2003, it is housed in buildings within a new £25 million complex designed by architects Fielden Clegg Bradley. The school also provides adult education to about 1,200 people.

Both the University of the West of England and Bristol City Football Club are partners with the school and helped fund the school's buildings and equipment.

The school operates a house system for pupils, with four houses: Leopards, Lions, Panthers and Tigers. The school is designated as a specialist Sports College, and runs a Performance Sport programme for netball, basketball, football, boxing and cricket.

In October 2013 One World Learning Trust, the academy's operator, was issued with a "pre-warning notice letter" by the Department for Education because the academic performance of the academy was unacceptably low.

In 2014 the school lost a racial discrimination employment tribunal case for repeatedly overlooking a black employee for promotion. Investigation showed that other black staff had been overlooked when appointing three white managers. The academy said "We are deeply sorry and extending our sense of sorrow to those involved".

During 2014 the school had two incidents of losing or failing to submit coursework required for external exams, causing pupils to have to retake a year of their education. In March 2015 the school announced a partnership with the Cabot Learning Federation, a major operator of Academies in Bristol, after Ofsted had issued an inadequate rating in an inspection report in January 2015, and the school was placed into special measures status.

In 2016 the Cabot Learning Federation, a multi-academy trust, took over as the operator of the school. The school remained in special measures.

Following an inspection in April 2019, the school is now rated as 'Good' in all areas, with Ofsted noting that "strong leadership" had "led to rapid improvement over the past three years".

In April 2024, staff started part-time strike action over the handling of bullying and harassment allegations by Special Education Needs and Disabilities staff. This later expanded to 11 issues, four relating to teachers and seven to support staff, including back pay, staff grading levels and pay for monitoring pupil's break periods. In July the National Education Union announced that 10 of the 11 issues had been resolved with the Cabot Learning Federation.

== Academic achievement ==
The table below shows the percentage of students hitting the key measure of 5+ A*-C GCSEs including English and Mathematics.

Year	2008	2009	2010	2011	2012	2013	2014	2015	2016
City Academy	24%	34%	36%	34%	40%	35%	29%	42%	40%
Bristol average	36%	40.2%	46.2%	50.2%	51.6%	52.3%	55.2%	54.0%	n/a
