= Alfred Dancey =

Alfred Dancey was convicted of the murder of nineteen-year-old William Braund on Bedminster Bridge, Bristol in 1849. At the time of the murder William was working for a local wine merchant. Alfred was also working - the newspapers say he was an errand boy but his prison records describes him as a porter and later a bricklayer. Alfred was a miller's son from Bathwick, he was 4 foot 10 and 3/4 inches tall with dark brown hair and grey eyes. His sentence was 10 years’ transportation. In March 1850 he was transferred from Bristol city jail to Gloucester County Prison and from there he was transferred to Parkhurst boys' prison on the Isle of Wight. He was there for the census of 1851. He left for Van Diemen's Land (Tasmania) on the Equestrian in 1852. His life after this remains to be uncovered.
