= Bristol Brunel Academy =

Location
- Speedwell Road; Bristol, BS15 1NU; England; 51.4680°N 2.5278°W

Information
- Type: Secondary Academy
- Established: 2007
- Trust: Cabot Learning Federation
- Department for Education URN: 135300 Tables
- Ofsted: Reports
- Principal: Jen Cusack
- Gender: Mixed
- Age: 11 to 19
- Enrolment: 1189
- Capacity: 1180 (Data from January 2016)
- Website: https://bristolbrunelacademy.clf.uk

Bristol Brunel Academy is a mixed sex Secondary Academy, located in Speedwell in the ward of Hillfields, Bristol, England. The academy is named after Isambard Kingdom Brunel. The Academy is part of the Cabot Learning Federation which is sponsored by the University of the West of England and Rolls-Royce.

== History ==
The site was originally the location of 2 single sex schools which became a mixed sex school called Speedwell Secondary School in the 1960s. A large part of the school burnt down in the mid 1970s, temporary classrooms were used while the school was rebuilt. The school became the first specialist school in Bristol when it changed to a technology college in 1997. The original buildings were in use up to July 2007 after which all the old school was completely demolished. Building for the new academy was undertaken on the site of the existing school in early 2006 by the construction company Skanska. The academy was officially opened in September 2007 by the then Prime Minister Gordon Brown and Ed Balls. The main school building was designed by Wilkinson Eyre Architects.

Brigid Allen was the former Principal of the Academy. Guy Keith-Miller is the Chair of the Council.

== Academic achievement ==
The school has improved its results over the period from 2008 and achieved its best ever GCSE score in 2014. The table below shows the percentage of students gaining 5 A*-C including English and Mathematics. The results of other LEA schools in the Bristol area are, on average, 10% higher than this.

2008	2009	2010	2011	2012	2013	2014	2015	2016
35%	25%	45%	41%	45%	45%	48%	44%	55%

== Controversy ==
In September 2025, a planned visit to the academy by Damien Egan, the Labour Member of Parliament for Bristol North East, was cancelled. According to reports in The Telegraph, the visit was withdrawn following objections raised by the Bristol branch of the Palestine Solidarity Campaign, alongside concerns reportedly expressed by staff representatives affiliated with the National Education Union.

The cancellation attracted national political attention. Steve Reed, the Secretary of State for Environment, Food and Rural Affairs, described the decision as "an outrage" in comments to Jewish News, stating that an elected MP had been prevented from visiting a school in his own constituency. Prime Minister Keir Starmer said "We will be holding to account those who prevented this visit to this school."

The Bristol Palestine Solidarity Campaign publicly welcomed the cancellation, describing it in a social media post as “a win for safeguarding”, citing concerns from parents, staff and community members regarding the proposed visit.

As of January 2026, Bristol Brunel Academy, the National Education Union and Egan had not publicly commented on the circumstances of the cancellation.

Ofsted carried out a snap inspection of the school's day-to-day operation and the carrying out of statutory duties on political impartiality, curriculum breadth and pupil personal development. Inspectors found "no evidence of partisan political views", that parents and staff were "overwhelmingly positive" about the school, and that the he school covered different cultures, religious beliefs and geographical locations, including racism and Holocaust Memorial Day, appropriately. Inspectors found no evidence that the visit was postponed due to co-ordinated pressure from staff and external groups and Egan's visit was rearranged.

== Notable alumni ==
- Kenny Stephens a former professional footballer.
- Justin Lee Collins a television presenter/comedian.
