= Merchants' Academy =

Merchants Academy

Location
- Gatehouse Avenue; Bristol, BS13 9AJ; England; 51.4108°N 2.6120°W

Information
- Type: Academy
- Established: 2008
- Trust: E-ACT
- Department for Education URN: 135597 Tables
- Ofsted: Reports
- Head teacher: Fiona Chapman (acting)
- Gender: Mixed
- Age: 3 to 18
- Enrolment: 1084
- Capacity: 1410
- Houses: Castle (yellow); Frome (green); Lawfords (blue); Temple (red); Bristol City Robins Foundation (red and white)
- Website: http://www.merchantsacademy.org/

Merchants' Academy is an independent academy in Withywood, Bristol, England. The school is funded by Bristol City Council and sponsored by the Society of Merchant Venturers and the University of Bristol.

The sponsors provided an initial £2 million towards new school buildings and facilities, and continue to provide additional revenue support.

== History ==
Merchants' Academy opened on 15 September 2008, replacing the former Withywood Community School. It is housed in a £30 million new build, which was erected on the site of the predecessor school.

The new build consists of seven separate buildings laid out around a central courtyard and the school was awarded the 2009 RIBA (Royal Institute of British Architects) regional award for architectural excellence.

The founding Principal was Stephen Kings, and the founding Chair of Governors was Denis Burn. Anne Burrell was appointed as Principal in 2010.

The academy was officially opened by Princess Anne on 9 February 2011, and an Ofsted Inspection in June 2011 concluded "Merchants' Academy is a good school where all students achieve well".

The academy opened its Army Cadet Force, in spring 2011 in its own purpose-built facilities, one of the very few in a state school in the country. The cadet force is part of the vision of the Society of Merchant Venturers to provide character-building activities to students. It was officially opened by Education Secretary Michael Gove and former Chief of the General Staff General Lord Dannatt on 28 February 2014.

The academy is sponsored by the Society of Merchant Venturers and Bristol University. It has links with various partners, such as Burges Salmon and The Bank of Ireland, who help deliver work experience and enterprise programmes.

In July 2017 the school received media attention for its policy of requiring pupils to wear a sign if their uniforms infringed strict rules.

In 2017 Ofsted placed the school in special measures due to racist incidents and "that pupils were not always respectful and tolerant of those of different faiths and need to be better information about the dangers of extremism and radicalisation".

In 2023 Bristol council forced a take over by E-ACT of Venturers Trust after years of failure which has been delayed until late 2024. Head teacher Brendan Hesketh led the school into its latest Ofsted inspection, March 2024, leaving two weeks before the inspection. Merchants academy received a full set of 'Inadequate', the second 'Inadequate' result Hesketh earned a school within a year. In May 2026, head teacher Katy Reeves resigned for personal reasons.

== Academic achievement ==
The school has had variable results on the measure of the percentage of students obtaining 5 A*-C GCSEs including English and Mathematics. The school achieved its best ever GCSE scores in 2013. The academy works closely with Bristol University to provide opportunities and support for students to continue to university. In 2014 it received an award for being in the top 20% for progress students had made in the five years from entry to GCSE.

	2009	2010	2011	2012	2013	2014	2015	2016
5 A*-C GCSEs including English and Maths	17%	25%	32%	40%	51%	45%	48%	29%

== Community ==
The academy run the Merchants' Academy Sports Centre adjacent to the school site, which is open to the general public, providing outdoor sports pitches, gym facilities and sports hall hire.
