= Orchard School Bristol =

Location
- Filton Road; Bristol, BS7 0XZ; England
- Coordinates: 51.4991°N 2.5801°W

Information
- Type: Secondary Academy
- Motto: Inspire Today, Empower for Life
- Established: 2012
- Trust: Trust in Learning
- Department for Education URN: 138448 Tables
- Ofsted: Reports
- Head teacher: Melanie Sweet
- Gender: Mixed
- Age: 11 to 16
- Enrolment: 925
- Houses: Avalon, Dorchester, Butterfield, Wisley
- Website: http://www.orchardschoolbristol.co.uk/

Orchard School Bristol is a secondary school with academy status, located in Horfield in Bristol, England.

== History ==
The school first opened in 1957 as Monks Park Secondary School. The name of the school as much of the nearby area belonged to the Monk Family. The school began teaching with just 24 students and 12 members of staff.

The original buildings of the school faced Filton Road. As the intake of students increased, plans were made to extend and the Northwick End was built. The new building was opened by the then Lord Mayor of London Sir Bernard Waley-Cohen in 1961. As the school continued to grow, it took over the buildings of the Upper Horfield Girls School.

The 1990s saw the pupil numbers in nearby schools drop. Pen Park School closed in 2000 with Lockleaze School closing in 2004. The students were therefore sent to Monks Park School for their secondary education.

As part of an £80m plan to restore confidence in Bristol schooling, Monks Park was one of four schools in the city to be rebuilt. The new building was opened in 2006.

In 2007, the school celebrated its Golden Jubilee.

In 2009, the then headteacher Dr Helen Holman made the decision to rename the school to Orchard School Bristol. The rebranding was to represent a fresh start owing to a bad reputation the school had.

In 2012, the school became an academy.

== Uniform ==
Orchard School's student uniform consists of a white shirt with house tie, school blazer, black trousers or skirt and plain black shoes. House ties are smart black stripes on a red, blue, yellow or green tie.

== Ofsted inspection ==
The school's latest inspection took place in May 2019 and was confirmed as Good in all areas.

Area	Grade
Effectiveness of leadership and management	Good
Quality of teaching, learning and assessment	Good
Personal development, behaviour and welfare	Good
Outcomes for pupils	Good

== Notable alumni ==
- Adie Allen - actor
- Chris Lines – professional footballer
- Robert del Naja - British artist, musician, singer and songwriter. Founder of Massive Attack
- Roni Size - English DJ and music producer
- Ruth Pitter - British poet
