= Bedminster Down School =

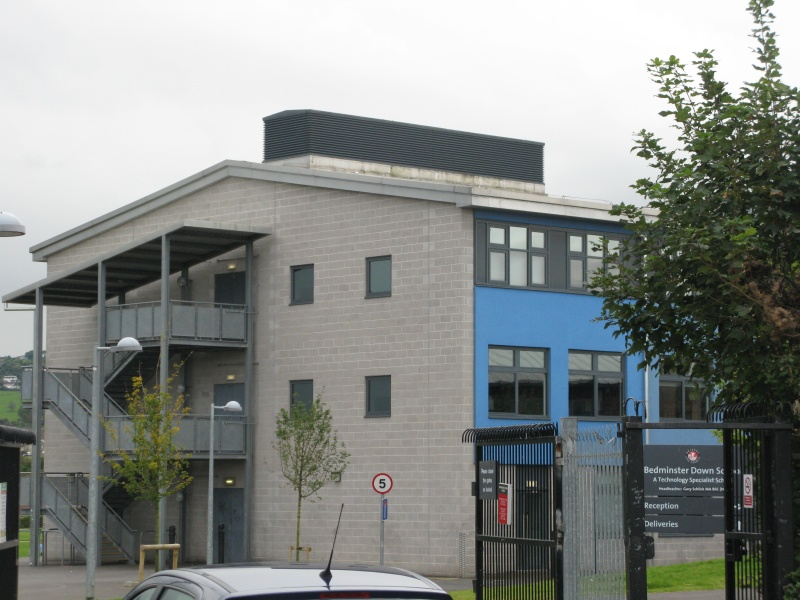
- View from Tyntesfield Road

Location
- Donald Road; Bristol, BS13 7DQ; England; 51.421652°N 2.619526°W

Information
- Type: Secondary Academy
- Motto: Belief, Determination, Success
- Established: 2012
- Trust: Futura Learning Partnership
- Department for Education URN: 138204 Tables
- Ofsted: Reports
- Head teacher: Louise Davies
- Gender: Mixed
- Age: 11 to 16
- Enrolment: 1,047
- Capacity: 1,080
- Houses: Southey, Blackwell, James, Moore
- Colours: Red, Blue, Purple, Green
- Publication: Bedminster Down Load
- Website: www.bedminsterdown.org.uk

Bedminster Down School is a mixed gender secondary school with academy status, located in the Bishopsworth area of Bristol, England.

== History ==
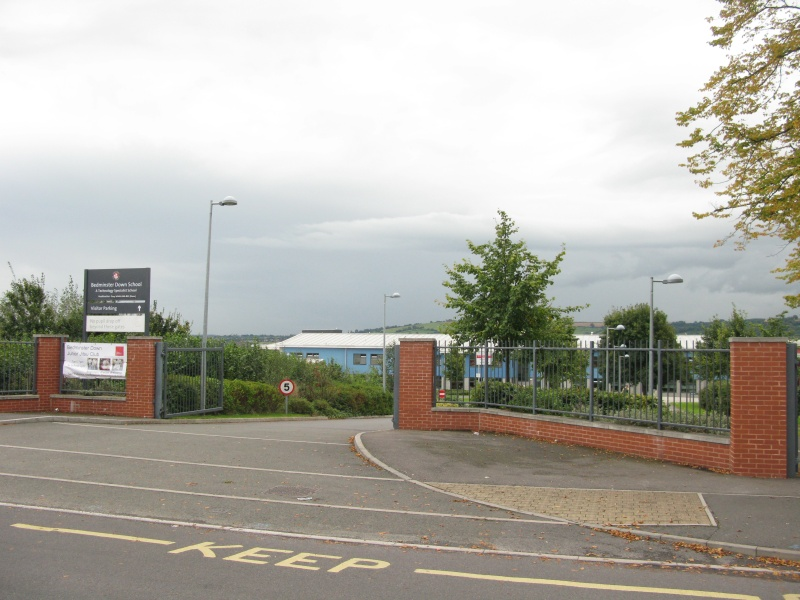
Main entrance on Donald Road

The school originally opened in 1955 as a comprehensive, although it was technically reestablished on 1 June 2012 upon officially becoming an academy. This switch was initially planned for September 2011, but was delayed.

In the 1960s, the school benefited from Bristol's "Schools' Art Collection", and ceramics by noted potters were displayed at the school.

In 2010, the head teacher of ten years, Marius Frank, left the school to become CEO of ASDAN, an education charity also based in Bristol.

The school was part of The Malago Learning Partnership (MLP). MLP was a collaboration between Bedminster Down, Cheddar Grove Primary, Greenfield Primary, Headley Park Primary, Parson Street Primary, Victoria Park Primary and St Peters CofE Primary.

In 2024 former headteacher Gary Schlick was selected as Chief Executive of the Futura Learning Partnership, a multi-academy trust which operates 27 schools in the West Country, which the school is a part of. The current head teacher is Louise Davies.

=== Building ===
In 2003, the school was selected as one of four schools in Bristol to be completely rebuilt through the PFI programme. Work began on the new school building in 2004, which opened in Easter 2006.

== Academic achievement ==
The school has improved its results year on year and achieved its best ever GCSE scores in 2016, the table below shows the percentage of students hitting the key measure of 5 A*-C (9 – 4 from 2017 onward) including English and Mathematics over the last 5 years.

2012	2013	2014	2015	2016	2017	2018
40%	36%	49%	37%	50%	56%	65%

== Ofsted ==
The school received a 'Good' rating following its last full Ofsted inspection, which took place on 6 and 7 November 2014. In specific areas, it received the following ratings:

Area	Grade
Overall Effectiveness	2 – Good
Achievement Of Pupils	2 – Good
Quality Of Teaching	2 – Good
Behaviour And Safety Of Pupils	2 – Good
Leadership And Management	2 – Good

A follow-up inspection on 29 and 30 November 2023 concluded that there was no change to the previous 'Good' rating.
