= New Room (disambiguation) =

New Room may refer to:

- New Room, song by American rock band Chavez (band)
- New Room, Bristol, the first Methodist chapel, built by John Wesley
- The New Room, 1989 novel by Canadian philosopher Jan Zwicky
