= Gloucester Road =

Gloucester Road may refer to:

- Gloucester Road tube station
- Gloucester Road, Bristol, the A38 through Horfield
- Gloucester Road, Hong Kong
- Gloucester Road, London
