= Bishopston and Ashley Down =

Electoral ward of Bristol, England

Coordinates: 51°29′01″N 2°35′13″W

- ward Bristol City Council
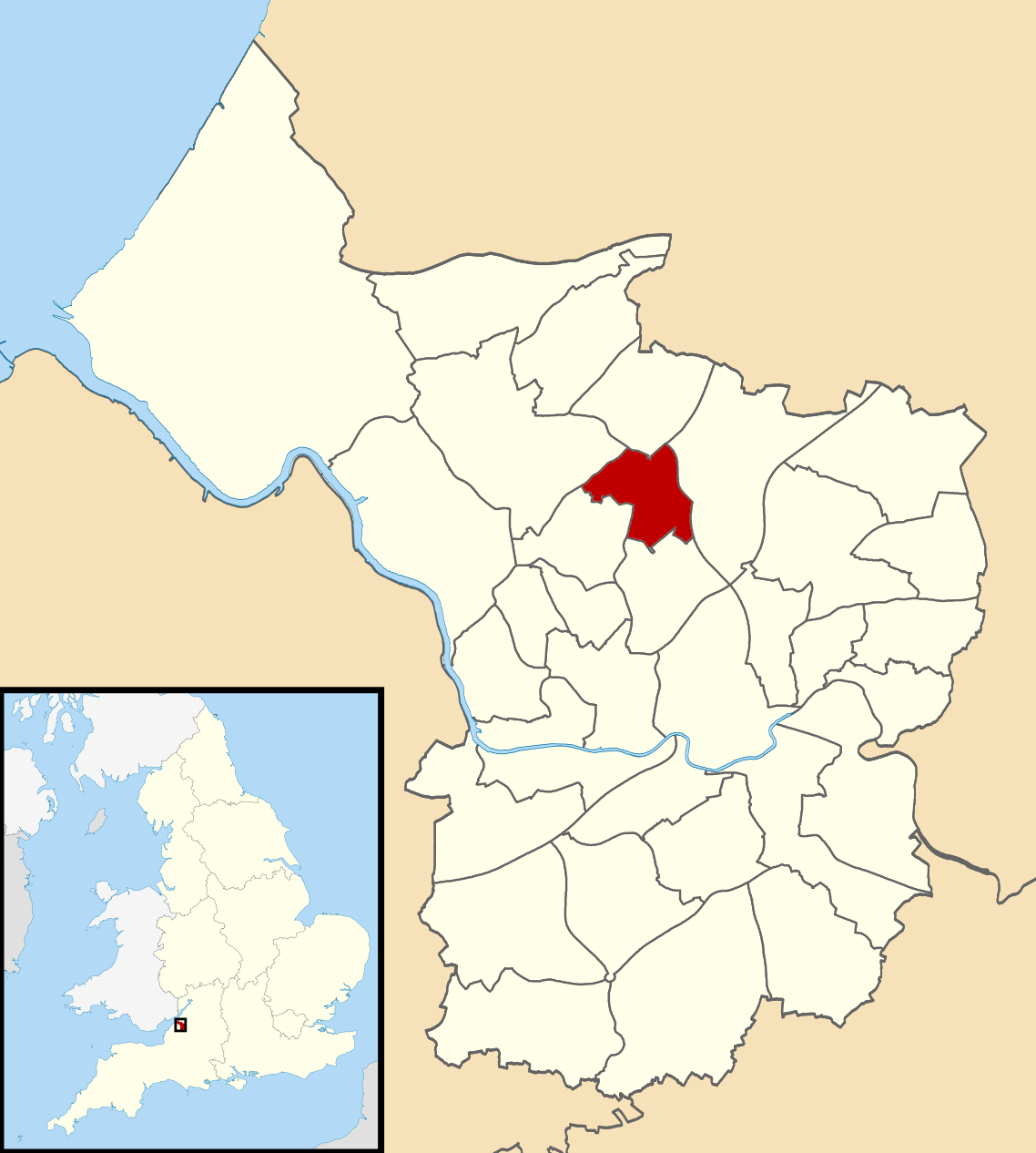
- Ward boundaries since 2016.
- County: Bristol
- Population: 13,304
- Electorate: 8,954

Current ward
- Created: 2016
- Councillor: Emma Edwards (Greens)
- Councillor: James Crawford (Greens)
- Created from: Bishopston
- UK Parliament constituency: Bristol North West

Bishopston and Ashley Down is one of the thirty-four electoral wards in the city of Bristol in the Southwest of England, United Kingdom. It is represented by two councillors on Bristol City Council, which as of 2024 are Emma Edwards and James Crawford, both members of the Green Party.

Bishopston and Ashley Down ward was created in May 2016 following a boundary review. It incorporates much of the area of the former Bishopston ward.

== Area profile ==
The ward covers all of Ashley Down as well as parts of Bishopston and Horfield. Notable places in the ward include Gloucester Road, Bristol County Ground, HMP Bristol, City of Bristol College (Ashley Down Centre) and Memorial Stadium.

Bishopston and Ashley Down has a greater than average number of young people living in the ward. As of 2020, over 18% of the population is aged 16–24, compared to the Bristol average of 16%. Nearly 30% of the population is aged 25–39, higher than the Bristol average of 27%.

For elections to the Parliament of the United Kingdom, Bishopston and Ashley Down is part of the Bristol North West constituency. Before the 2024 boundary changes, it was in Bristol West constituency.

== Council elections ==
=== 2024 election ===
Bishopston & Ashley Down (2 seats)
Party	Candidate	Votes	%	±%
Green	Emma Edwards	2,615	59.87	+7.19
Green	James Crawford	2,405	55.06	+9.45
Labour	Andrew Milton	1,432	32.78	+5.68
Labour	Eileen Means	1,316	30.13	+3.81
Liberal Democrats	Laura Barry	190	4.35	−8.10
Liberal Democrats	Barry Cash	190	4.35	−7.13
Conservative	Samuel Williams	159	3.64	−2.76
Conservative	Edward Yates	139	3.18	−3.08
Turnout		4,368	49.00	−6.88
Green hold				
Green hold				

=== 2023 by-election ===
A by-election was held on 24 August 2024 following the resignation of Cllr Lily Fitzgibbon.

Bishopston & Ashley Down (1 seat)
Party	Candidate	Votes	%	±%
Green	James Crawford	1,294		
Labour	Andrew Milton	981		
Liberal Democrats	Barry Cash	184		
Conservative	Roddy Jaques	91		
TUSC	Amy Sage	26		
Turnout		2,576	29.2%	
Green hold				

=== 2021 election ===
Bishopston & Ashley Down (2 seats)
Party	Candidate	Votes	%	±%
Green	Emma Edwards	2,766		
Green	Lily Fitzgibbon	2,395		
Labour	Eileen Means	1,423		
Labour	Joe Rayment	1,382		
Liberal Democrats	Becky Lockyer	654		
Liberal Democrats	Phil Kemp	603		
Conservative	Tony Holdsworth	336		
Conservative	Adam Brown	329		
Turnout		5,251	55.68	
Green gain from Labour		Swing		
Green hold		Swing		

=== 2016 election ===
Bishopston & Ashley Down (2 seats)
Party	Candidate	Votes	%	±%
Labour	Tom Brook	1,833	36.57	
Green	Eleanor Jane Combley	1,755	35.02	
Green	Daniella Elsa Radice	1,745	34.82	
Labour	David John McLeod	1,278	25.50	
Liberal Democrats	Rebecca Anne Lockyer	937	18.70	
Liberal Democrats	Kate Alexandra Bowman	905	18.06	
Conservative	David Thomas Harrison Lewis	423	8.44	
Conservative	Pat Wyatt	343	6.84	
Turnout		5,012	56.95	
Labour win (new seat)				
Green win (new seat)				
