= United Methodist Church, Berkeley Road, Bristol =

United Methodist Church, Berkeley Road, Bishopston
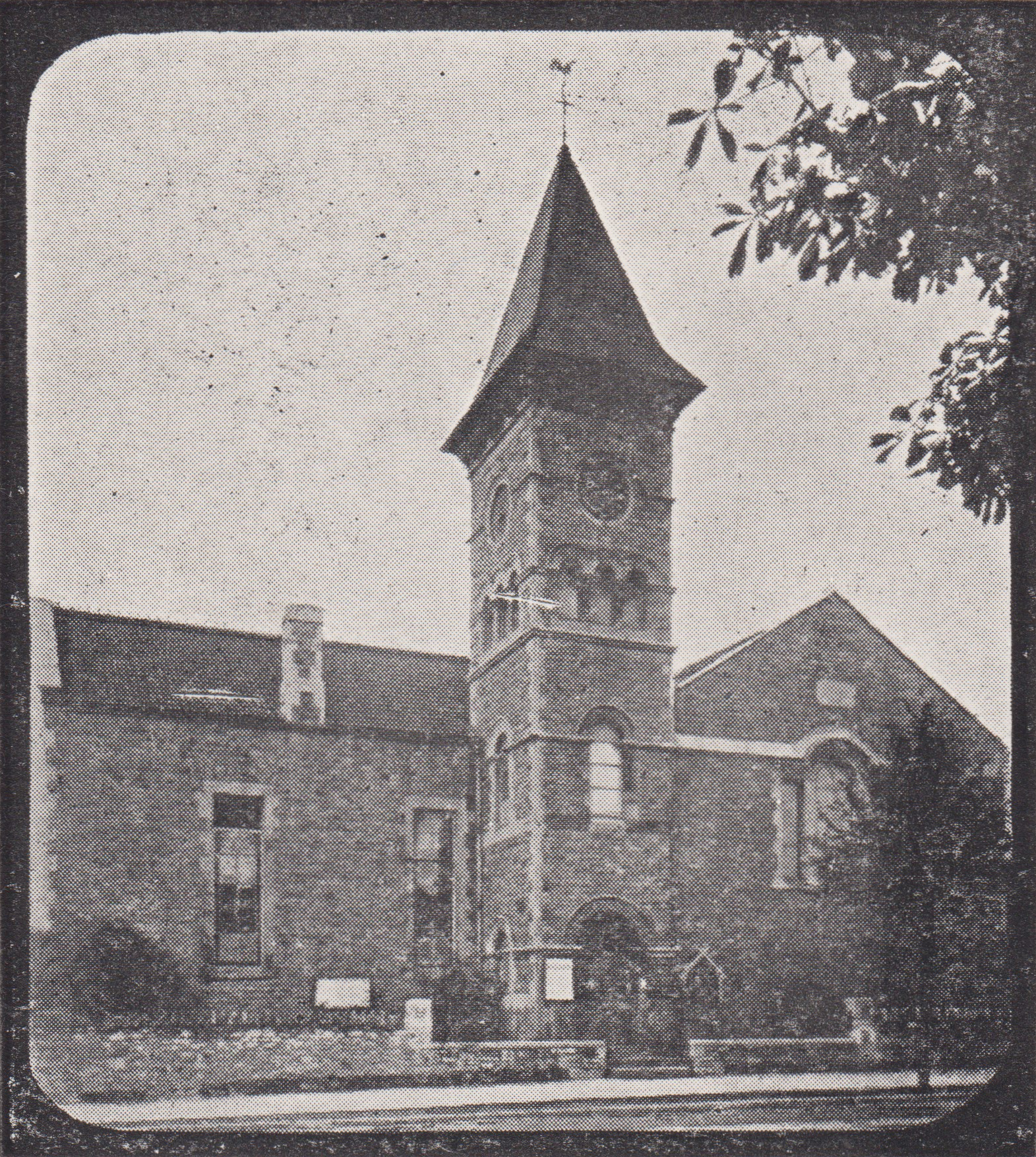
- Church in 1915

- shown within Bristol
- 51°28′31″N 2°35′29″W
- Address: 102 Gloucester Road, Bishopston, Bristol
- Country: England
- Denomination: Methodist

History
- Founded: 1865

Architecture
- Closed: 1959

The United Methodist Church, Berkeley Road, Bristol is a former Methodist church in Bishopston, in the city of Bristol, England.

== History ==
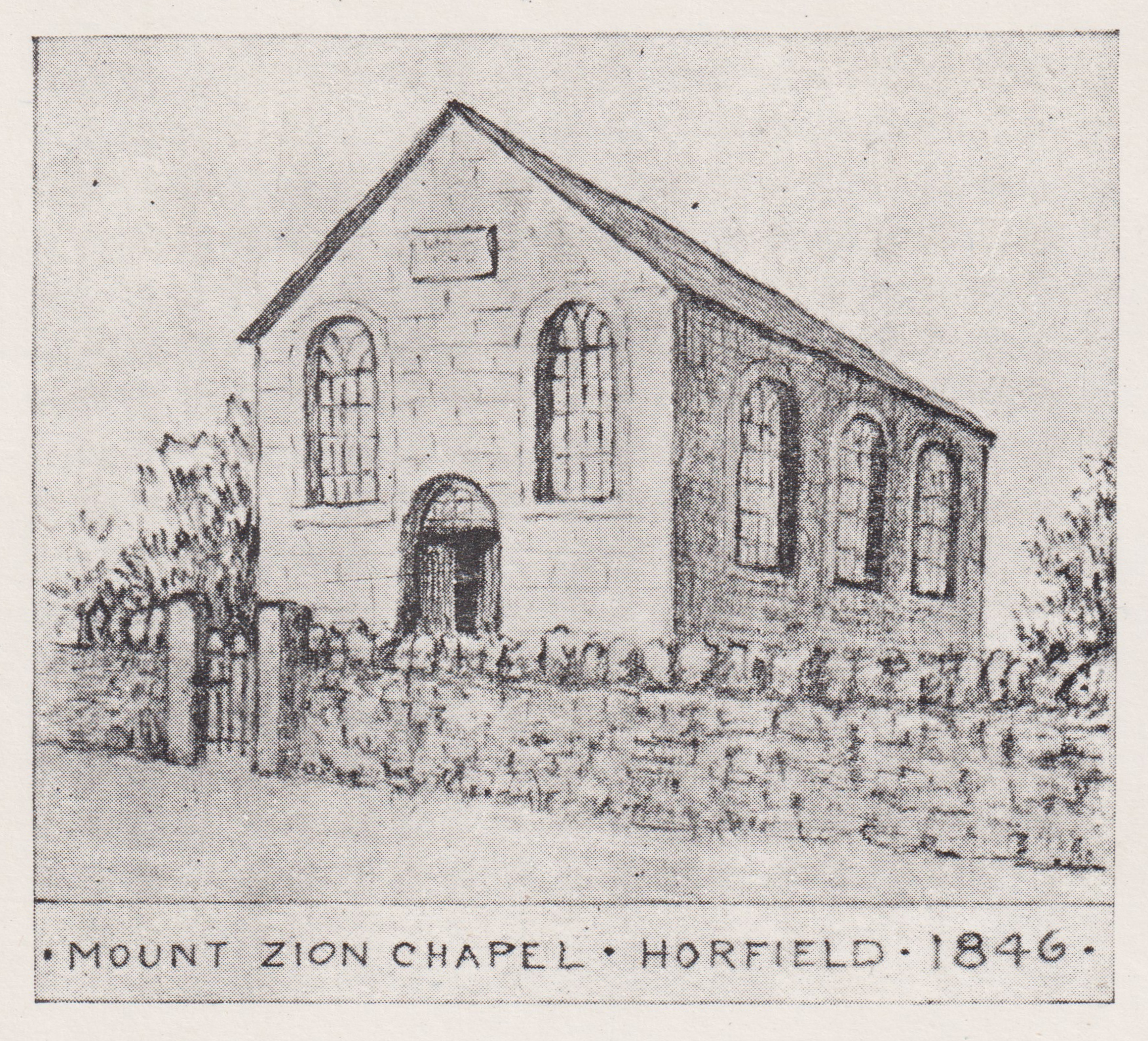
Mount Zion Chapel, 1846. Located on the east side of Gloucester Rd, opposite the start of what became Bishop Rd.

The church was built in 1865 to replace the Mount Zion Chapel, which was located 400m further north up Gloucester Road. Methodism had been popular in Bristol since 1739, when John Wesley preached in the city and opened the New Room in the centre. It was the first purpose-built Methodist meeting house.

The Mount Zion Chapel, built in 1846, was the earliest Methodist hall in Horfield, an area that Bristol was expanding towards. However, the owner of the site had forbidden the construction of ancillary buildings, such as a school house. That encouraged the chapel's members to find a new site. At the same time, following a schism in the Methodist movement, the Mount Zion Chapel became part of the United Methodist Free Church.

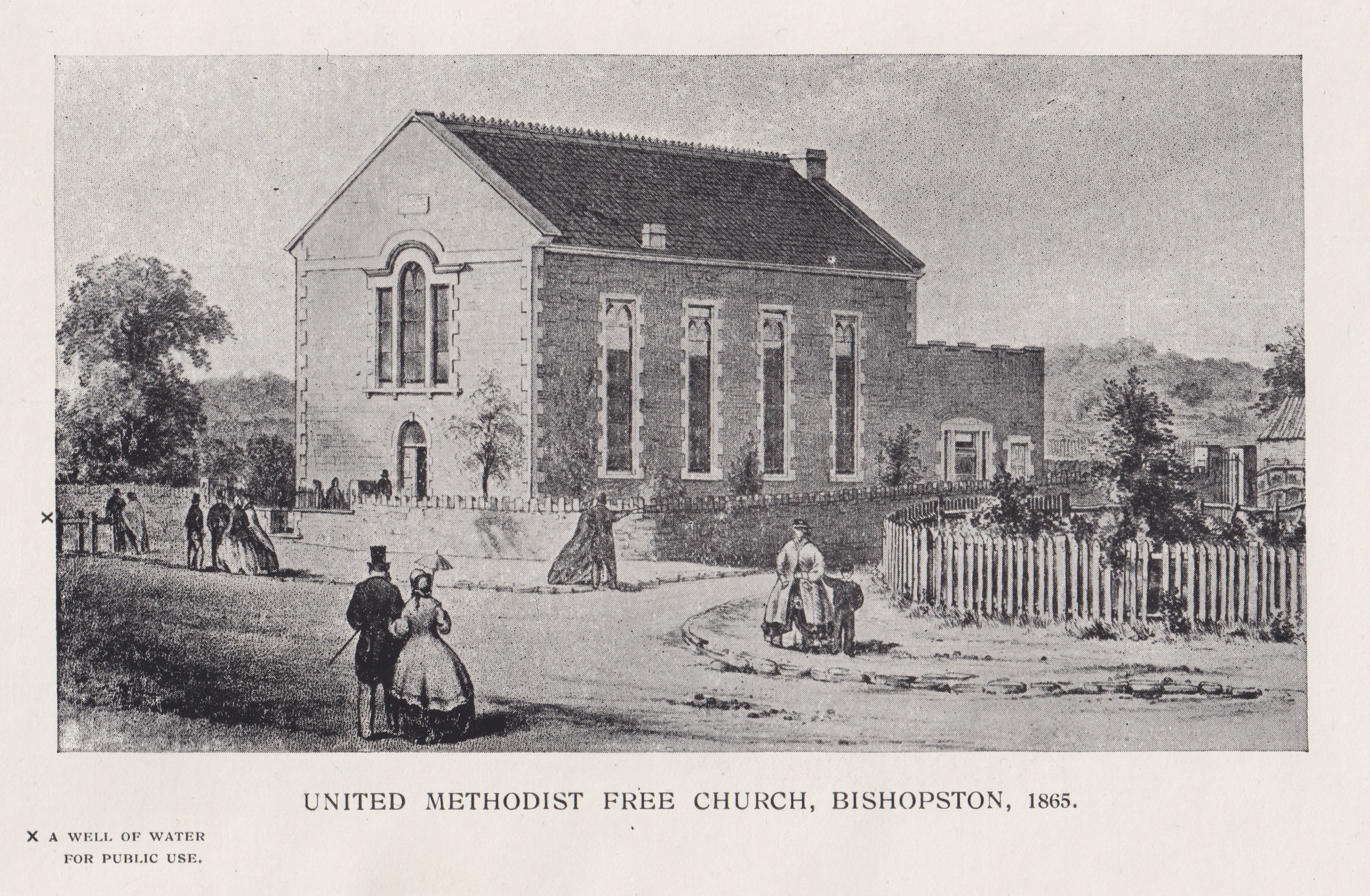
United Methodist Hall in 1865, seen from Gloucester Rd, with Berkeley Rd branching off.

The new church site was acquired on the main road from Bristol to Gloucester, in an area that was then undergoing extensive residential and commercial development. The chapel was built in 1865 for an initial outlay of £663, using stone from the quarry behind 'Horfield Pleasure Ground', 600 metres north, where HM Prison, Bristol was later built. The initial church consisted of a simple hall on the corner of Gloucester Road and the newly laid Berkeley Road. The foundation stone was laid at ceremony on Good Friday, 14 April 1865 by the Bristol tobacco magnate, Henry Overton Wills. It was opened on 28 September, with a seating capacity of 250. The church's first minister was the Rev. J. Garside, who had previously been the minister at Mount Zion Chapel.

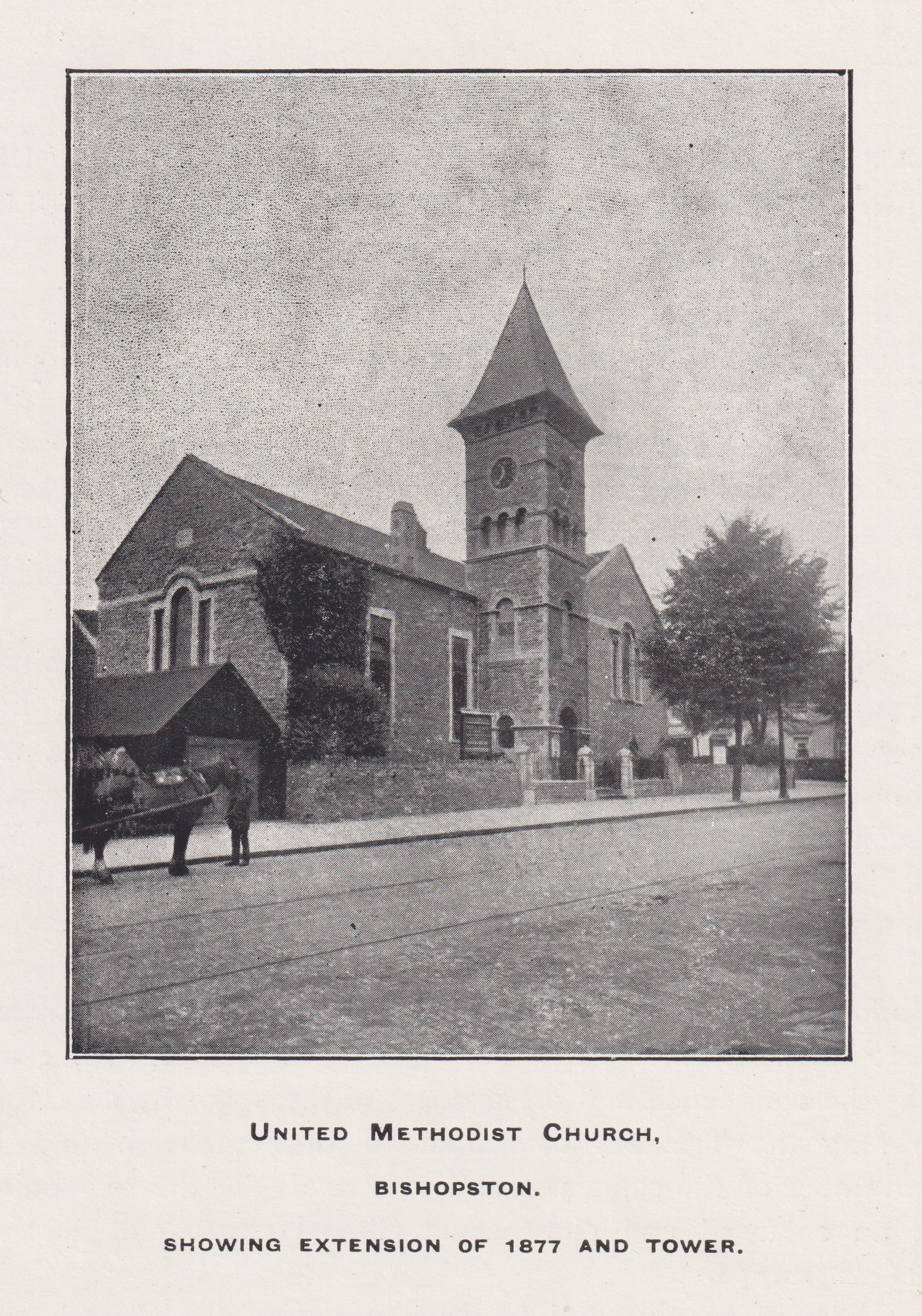
Church in 1877, Gloucester road frontage

The church grew rapidly in its early years. A day school was established by 1867 located in an ancillary building fronting on to Berkeley Road. In 1877 a tower was added on the Gloucester Road side, with an entrance at its base. Another hall was added to the south on the Gloucester Road, to increase the capacity of the church to 500. This development also led to the appointment of the church's first resident minister: Rev. E. Craine.

By 1900 the church was said to be looking 'old, dirty and dust begrimed...neglected and decayed.' A newly-appointed pastor, Rev. J Percival, oversaw its extensive modernisation and refurbishment. This included the replacement of 'old fashioned' pews, the installation of electric lighting and central heating, as well as the addition of cathedral glass windows donated by members of the congregation. Fixing the broken clock, which 'was a great convenience to the residents of the rapidly increasing neigbourhood', was felt to be particularly important, resulting in a local campaign to fund the repairs. It was the only public clock in the area and said to have long 'hastened many a laggard southward to the city, and in other directions relieved or quickened many a passer-by.' When the clock broke down again in 1956, there was a similar public appeal to repair this 'Public Clock', followed by a ceremonial restarting on 5 November 1956.

In 1907 the church became part of the amalgamated United Methodist Church, comprising the United Methodist Free Church, the Bible Christian Methodists and the Methodist New Connexion churches. A new lecture hall was added in 1911 to expand the school's teaching capacity.

Following the Methodist Union of 1932, the United Methodists merged with the Primitive Methodists and the Wesleyan Methodists to form a new church, known simply as the "Methodist Church". The merger led to some Methodist churches being closed down where there was overcapacity in a given area.

== Closure and redevelopment ==
The Berkeley Road church closed in 1959 with its records being transferred to Bristol Archives. Methodists in the area continued to be served by Bishopston Methodist Church, established in 1890 as a Wesleyan Methodist church. It was a much larger church, situated just 350m further up Gloucester Road. The organ from the Berkeley Road church, along with some of its members, went to Horfield Methodist Church, which lies 1300m north of the Berkeley Road church.

By 1966 the church had been converted into a furniture showroom while the pointed roof on the tower was removed. In 1969 the old church was serving as a furniture sales room for Newbery and Spindler. The site and its buildings were later acquired by Nailsea Electrical, which sold large electrical appliances. The buildings were used as a shop and warehouse until the business went into administration in 2024.

In 2023, plans were submitted to Bristol City Council convert the site into apartments. This prompted local opposition centred on concerns about the lack of parking spaces, traffic and congestion. The initial application was rejected in May 2023 but then approved a month later following advice that the developers would probably win if the matter went to court, 'costing the taxpayer thousands'. In November 2024 the council approved a revised planning application to convert the site into 17 residential apartments, with commercial units at ground floor. Parts of the old school buildings on Berkeley Road were to be demolished in the process to allow the construction of new apartments.
