= Bishop Road Primary School =

Location
- Bishop Road; Bristol, BS7 8LS; England

Information
- Type: Community school
- Established: 1896
- Department for Education URN: 109116 Tables
- Ofsted: Reports
- Headteacher: Gillian Powe
- Gender: Mixed
- Age: 4 to 11
- Enrolment: 800
- Capacity: 840
- Colour: Purple
- Website: http://www.bishoproad.bristol.sch.uk/

Bishop Road Primary School is a primary school in Bristol, England. It is on Bishop Road in the Bishopston area of Bristol. The school opened in 1896. It is the largest primary school in Bristol, notable for having educated Cary Grant and Paul Dirac. The headteacher is Joe Emissah.
