= Horfield Common =

Area of open space in Bristol, England

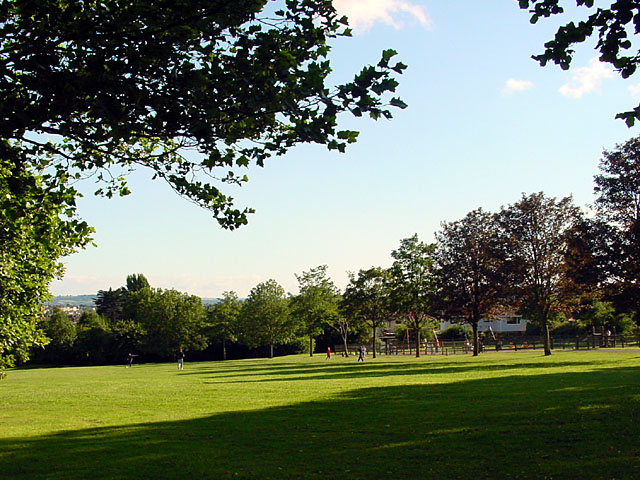
- View of the Horfield Common

- Location within Bristol
- Type: public open space
- Location: Horfield, Bristol, England
- Coordinates: 51°29′08″N 2°35′31″W
- Area: 79 acres (32 ha)
- Created: 1908
- Operator: Bristol City Council
- Open: All year

Horfield Common is an area of public open space and parkland located in Horfield, Bristol. Covering approximately an area of 32 hectares (79 acres), it is one of the city's largest public parks and is one of Bristol's highest points of land above sea level. It provides facilities for recreation and natural conservation, and is often used for leisure, walking, team sports and sightseeing.

== History ==
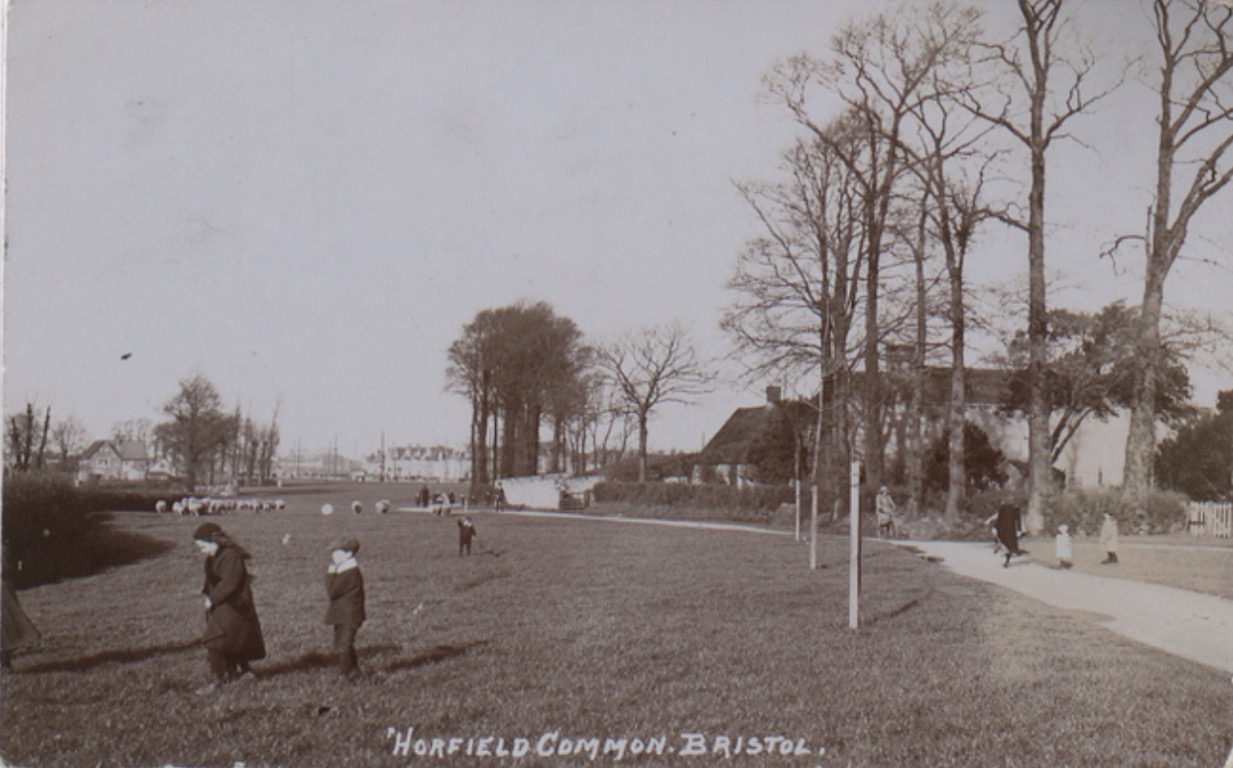
Horfield Common in 1915

Horfield Common has its origins as medieval land belonging to the parish of Horfield, where local inhabitants exercised traditional grazing and other land rights. During the nineteenth century, increasing urban development threatened the survival of the common. Following campaigns to preserve it for public use, the land was acquired by Bristol Corporation in 1908 and has remained a public open space ever since. Throughout the twentieth century the common was developed with recreational facilities, while retaining much of its open character. Tree planting, sports facilities and footpaths were introduced, and parts of the site have since been managed to encourage biodiversity. It is currently maintained by the Bristol City Council.

== Features and recreation ==
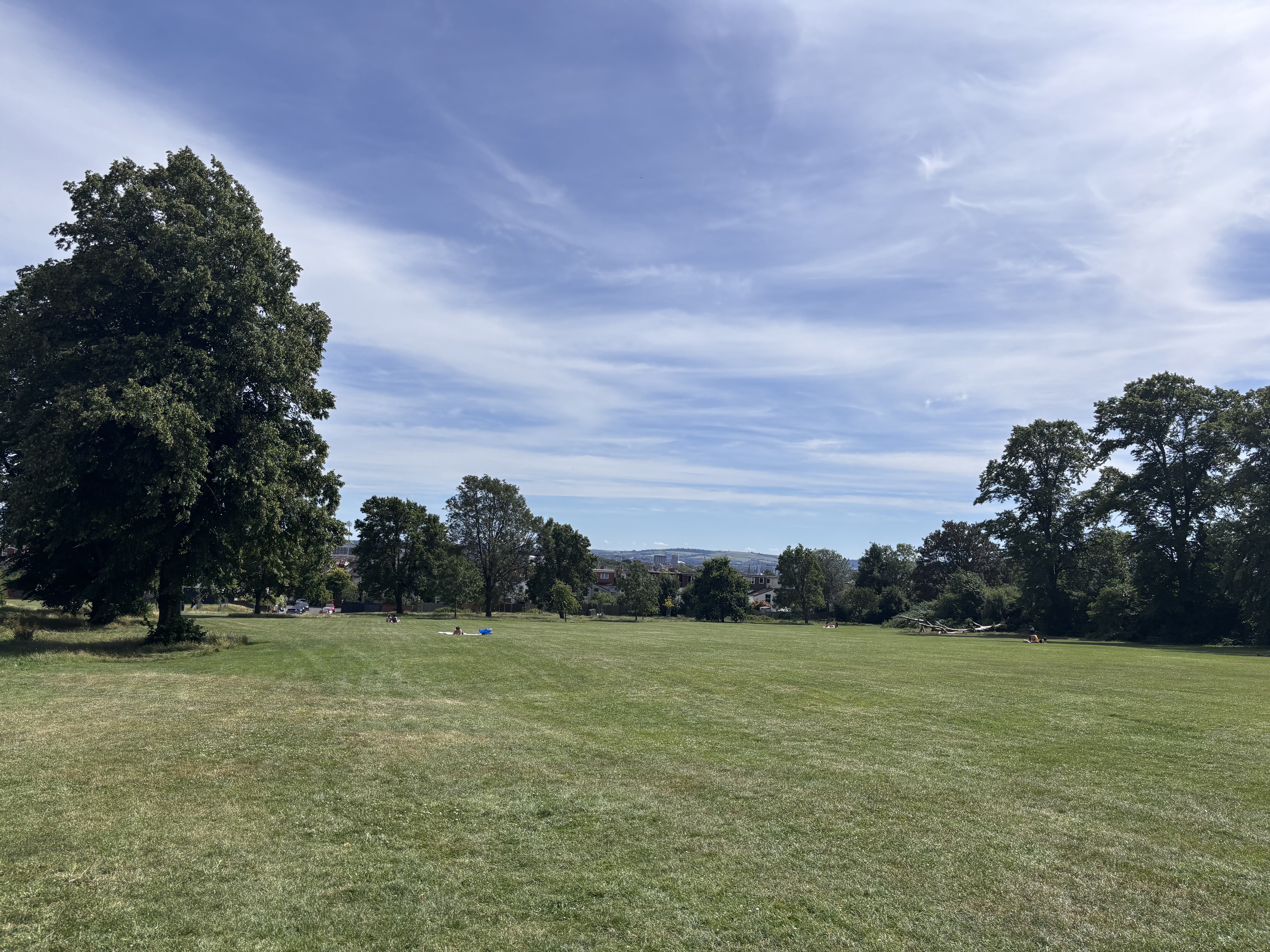
Horfield Common in 2026. In the distance the Castlemead and Castle Park View towers can be seen.

Horfield Common consists of open grassland, trees and informal walking paths. Its facilities include a wildlife pond, children's play areas, tennis courts, bowling greens and several football pitches. The common also contains areas managed as wildflower habitat, supporting a range of birds, insects and other urban wildlife. Horfield Common is used for walking, jogging, dog walking and informal recreation. Its football pitches are regularly used by local amateur clubs, while the tennis courts and bowling greens are open to the public. The common also hosts occasional community events and outdoor activities.
