= Bishopston, Bristol =

Suburb in Bristol, England

Coordinates: 51.47693°N 2.59751°W

Bishopston
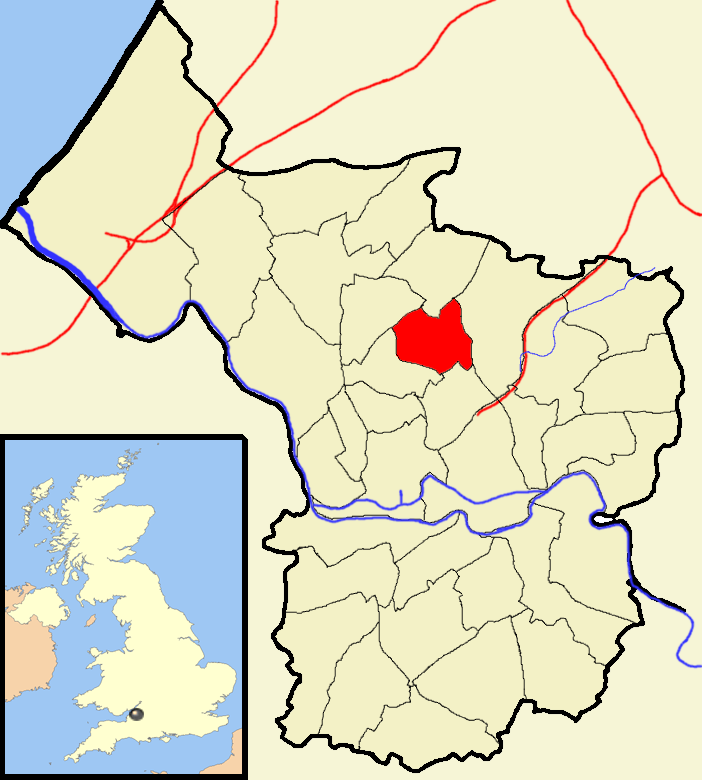
- Boundaries of the Council Ward, shown within Bristol.
- Population: 13,871 (2011.Ward)
- OS grid reference: ST586755
- Unitary authority: Bristol
- Ceremonial county: Bristol
- Region: South West
- Country: England
- Sovereign state: United Kingdom
- Post town: Bristol
- Postcode district: BS7
- Dialling code: 0117
- Police: Avon and Somerset
- Fire: Avon
- Ambulance: South Western
- UK Parliament: Bristol West

Bishopston is a suburb of the city of Bristol in south-west England. Bishopston is around Gloucester Road (A38), the main northern arterial road in the city and Bishop Road.

== History ==
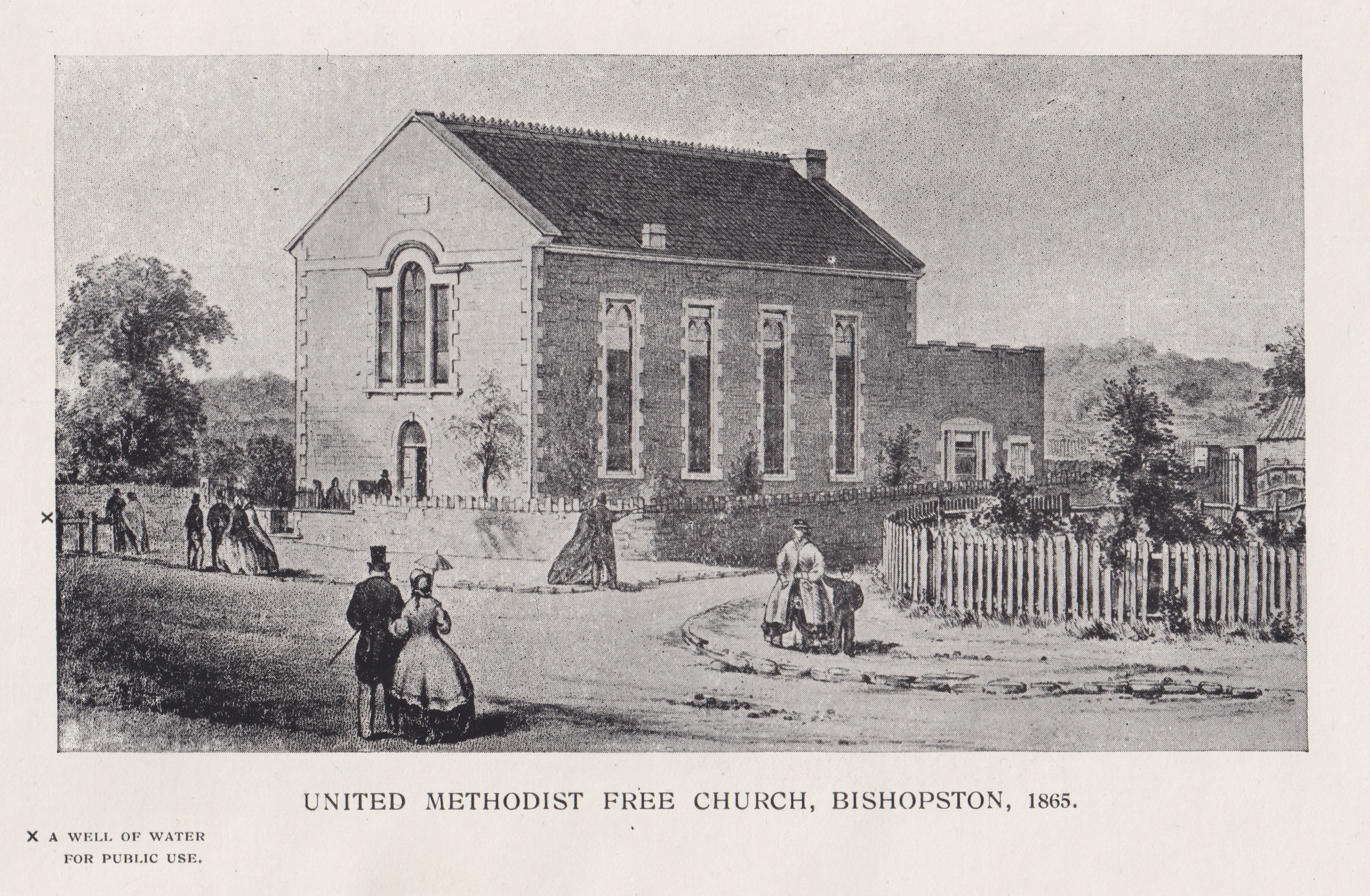
United Methodist Church at the junction of Gloucester Rd and Berkeley Rd in 1865

Bishopston is named after the bishop of the local diocese who controversially sold off the church's land to private developers in the early 19th century. The sale was raised as an issue in the House of Commons. The parish of Bishopston was then created in July 1862 with a population of 1300, expanding to 9140 in the 1901 census.

== Demographics ==
In the 2001 census Bishopston registered a resident population of 11,996. The district is part of the Bristol built-up area, running directly into the surrounding districts of Redland, Ashley Down, Horfield and Henleaze.

The area has a relatively large student population, with 21% of the over-16 population in education compared to 8.4% in Bristol and 5.1% in England and Wales.

== Politics ==
For elections to Bristol City Council, it is split between the electoral wards of Redland and Bishopston and Ashley Down. The boundary between the two wards runs along Gloucester Road and then the southern perimeters of HMP Bristol and the playing fields of Bishop Road Primary and Redland Green School, with areas to the southwest in Redland ward.

For elections to the UK Parliament, Redland ward is in Bristol Central constituency, and the Bishopston and Ashley Down ward is in Bristol North West constituency.

Before boundary changes in 2016, Bishopston was itself an electoral ward.

== Facilities ==
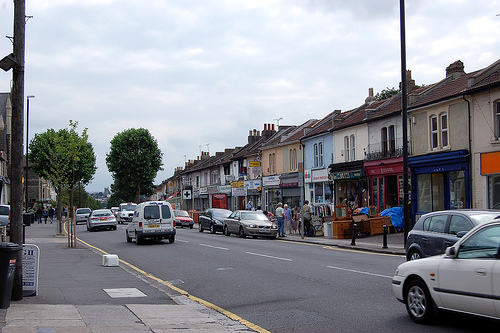
Gloucester Road, the main route through Bishopston

The main artery, Gloucester Road, is a traditional high street.

== Education ==
The area has two primary schools, St. Bonaventure's Catholic Primary School and Bishop Road Primary School, which opened in 1900. and is the largest primary school in Bristol,

== Sport ==
Bishopston is home to Gloucestershire County Cricket Club, off Nevil Road. The ground's capacity has been increased to hold international cricket matches.

== Architecture ==
The David Thomas Memorial church, in neighbouring St Andrews, was erected between 1879 and 1881 but was demolished in 1987, destroying most of a Gothic fantasy by Stuart Coleman. The building still retains a thin octagonal spire and west front but the massive halls, apse and rib vaults have now gone, and have been replaced by flats by Stride Treglown.

== Notable residents ==
Bishopston was the home of two Nobel Prize–winning physicists. In 1933 Paul Dirac, who attended Bishop Road Primary School, a few hundred metres from where he lived on Monk Road, won the prize after his contributions to quantum mechanics. In 1950 Cecil Frank Powell won the award for contributions to physics. Television presenter Adam Hart-Davis and psychologist Susan Blackmore lived in the area.

The film star Cary Grant attended Bishop Road School in Bishopston. As a child he lived nearby in Hughenden Road next to Horfield Common, where there is a blue plaque to commemorate him.

== Filming ==
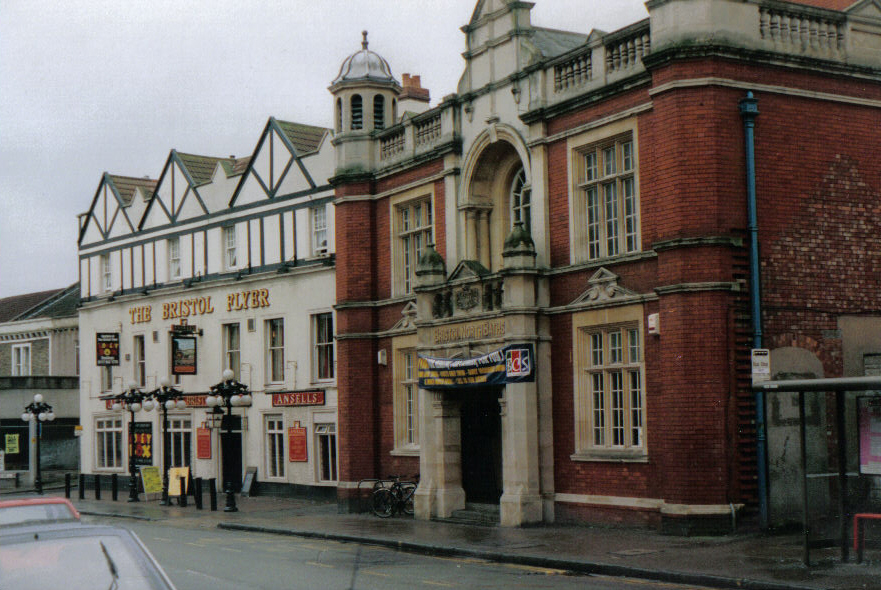
Bristol North swimming baths and The Bristol Flyer Pub

Some of the location filming for the cult BBC sitcom The Young Ones was done in Codrington Road and elsewhere. The external shots for the "bank-robbing" scene in the last episode were filmed outside the now closed Bristol North Swimming Baths on Gloucester Road.

Bishopston appeared in aerial shots on the BBC's Secret Life of Gardens TV show.

== See also ==
- United Methodist Church, Berkeley Road, Bristol
