= St Andrews, Bristol =

Suburb of Bristol, England

Coordinates: 51.47267°N 2.58878°W

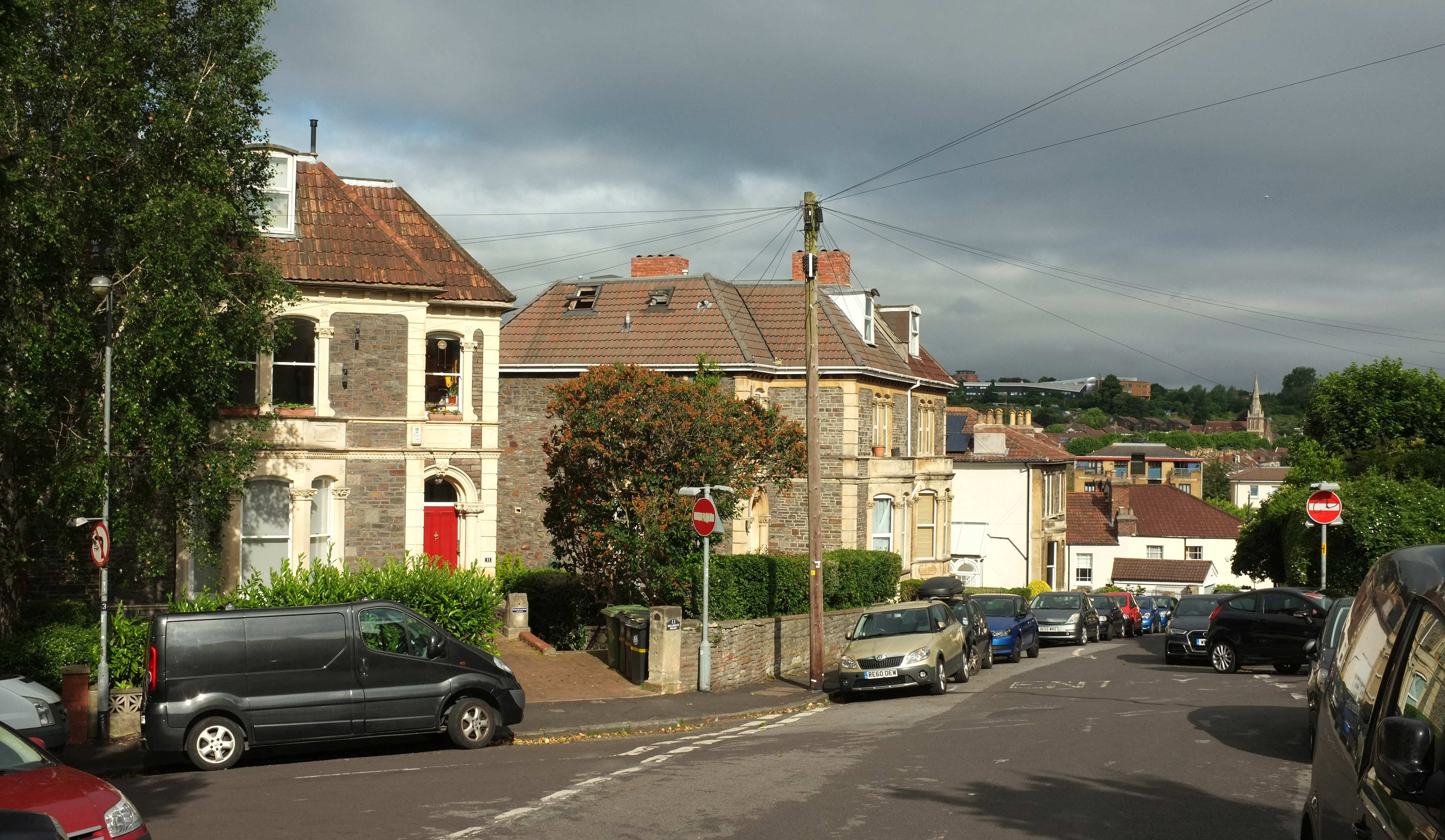
Belvoir Road, St Andrews, 2018

St Andrew's is a suburb of Bristol situated about 3 km (1.8 miles) north of the city centre.

The area is roughly bounded by the Severn Beach Railway Line, Gloucester Road, Somerville Road and Cromwell Road; however the boundary is unclear, as the Ordnance Survey map labels this area as Montpelier, whereas according to the National Gazetteer of 1868, Montpelier is a hamlet within the Parish of St Andrew's. St Andrew's Church, which gave the area its name, was located on St Andrew's Road, Montpelier. It was consecrated in January 1845, declared disused in October 1963 and was demolished in 1969.

The area was developed in the late 19th century as St Andrew's Park Estate, and consists mostly of large Victorian villas, with some inter-war housing and some minor rebuilding in Cromwell Road and Belvoir Road following enemy action in World War II.

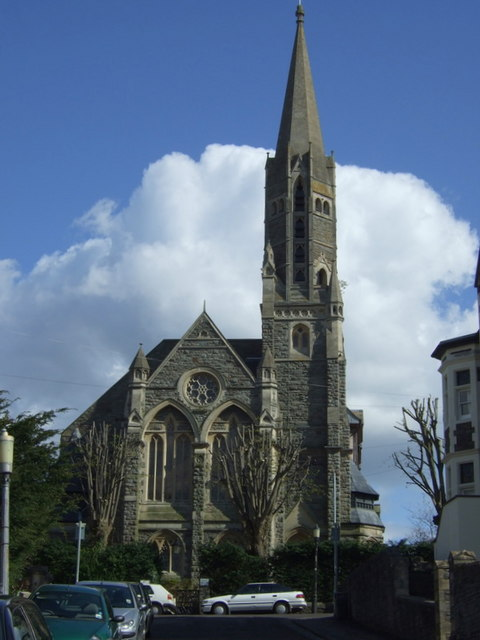
David Thomas House, viewed from Overton Road, formerly the David Thomas Memorial Church

The David Thomas Memorial church was erected on Belmont Road 1879–1881 and was designed in the gothic style by Stuart Colman. The building still retains a thin octagonal spire and west front but the halls, apse and rib vaults have been demolished and replaced by sheltered accommodation in 1988. The church contained a stained glass window called the "Bools Memorial Window", designed by Arnold Wathen Robinson to commemorated the deaths of the four Bools brothers. The Bools brothers were all members of the RAF, and died in test flights and operations during the Second World War. The stained glass window was donated to the Royal Airforce Museum by the Bools' sister, Mrs Elizabeth Woods, when the building was converted.

St Andrew's is well served by public transport, with frequent buses to all parts of the city from Gloucester Road, buses to University of West England's Frenchay Campus and a local train service from Montpelier to Bristol Temple Meads, Clifton and Avonmouth on the Severn Beach Line.

== St Andrew's Park ==
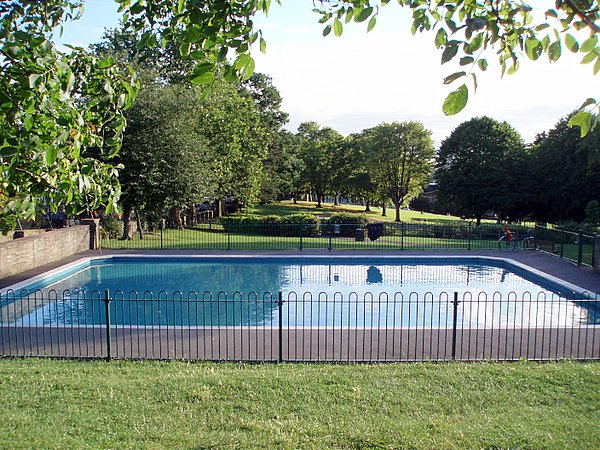
The paddling pool in St Andrews Park

St Andrew's Park is in the centre of the area. The park was laid out in 1895, originally with bandstand, paved paths, flowerbeds and the lower area "laid out like an ornamental pleasure ground". These features are no longer present, and the park now has a well-sized children's play area, permanent paddling pool (serviced and used only in the summer months) and public toilets (limited opening hours).

A bowling green was constructed in St Andrew's Park by Bristol Corporation in 1914–15 following requests from local residents. The six-rink green was formally opened on 1 May 1915 by Alderman J. Boyd, who threw the first jack. The bowling green remains in use.

On 30 April 1941 an RAF Wellington bomber on a night training flight crashed in the park after hitting barrage balloon cables, killing three of the six crewmen. The crash was not reported at the time for fear of lowering morale. A memorial plaque was installed after John Clarke, the descendant of one of the deceased, researched into the crash and brought it to the attention of the Friends of the Park who applied for lottery funding.
