= John Wesley's New Room =

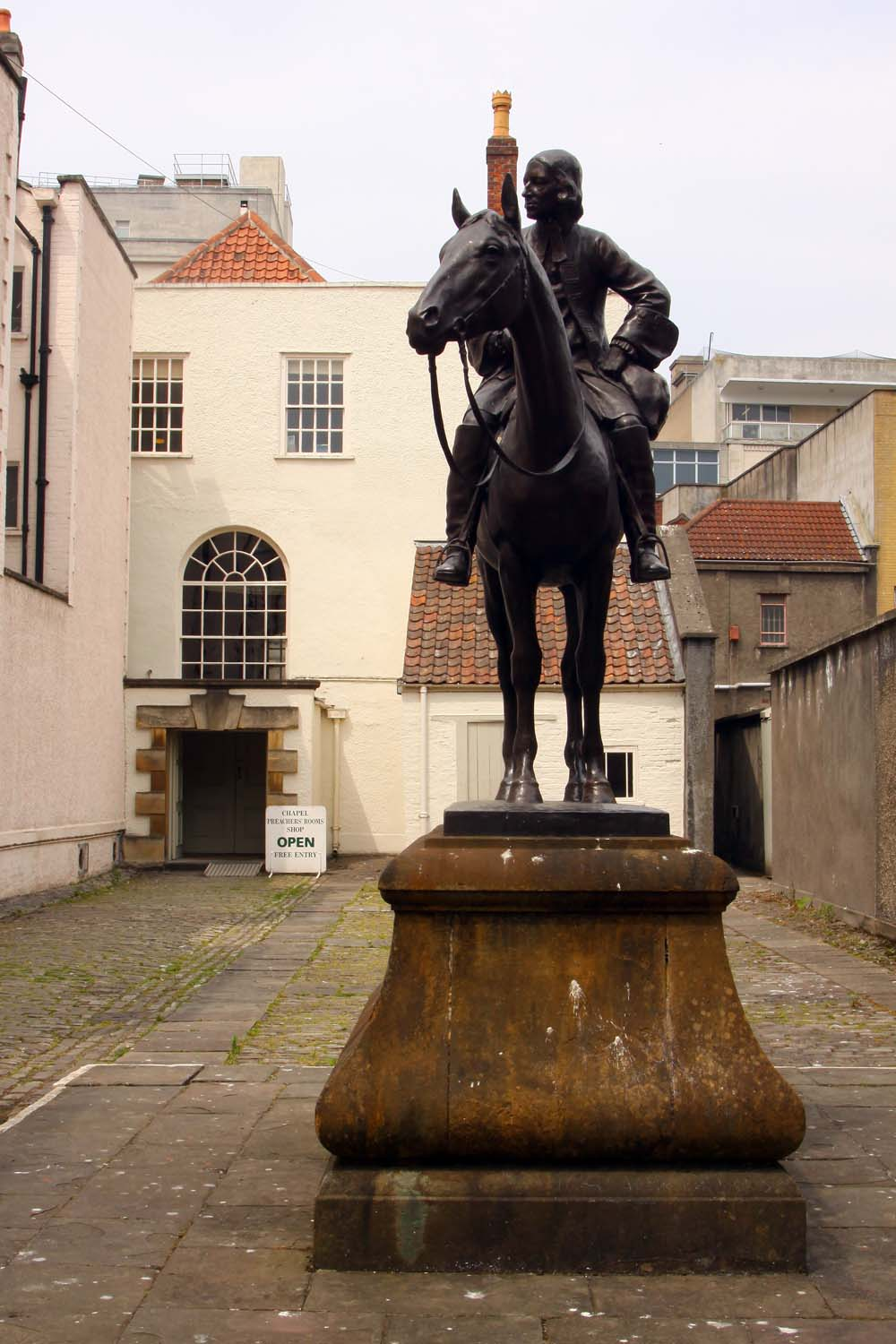
- Statue of John Wesley, with the New Room behind, off the Broadmead entrance
- John Wesley's New Room
- 51.4579°N 2.5901°W
- Location: 36 The Horsefair, Bristol, England,
- Denomination: Methodist

History
- Founder: John Wesley

Architecture
- Completed: May 1739

John Wesley's New Room is a historic building located between The Horsefair and Broadmead, Bristol, England. Opened in June 1739, it housed the earliest Methodist societies, and was enlarged in 1748. As the oldest purpose-built Methodist preaching house (chapel), it has been designated by Historic England as a Grade I listed building.

A Methodist museum is housed in the preachers' rooms above the chapel. The courtyards around the building contain statues of John Wesley and his brother Charles.

== History ==
On 2 April 1739 John Wesley began preaching in the open fields at Bristol, and founded societies there. Under Wesley's direction, the building followed two months later, making it the oldest purpose-built Methodist chapel in the world. He called it "our New Room in the Horsefair". Most of the funding for the materials and construction of the New Room came from William Seward, who contributed substantially, and through the solicitations of George Whitefield, a very popular preacher in the mid 18th century.

The chapel was built with a double-decker pulpit, which was common at the time, and is lighted by an octagonal lantern window to reduce the amount paid in window tax. In addition to meetings and worship, the New Room was used as a dispensary and schoolroom for the poor people of the area. The pews and benches were made from old ship timber. The Baldwin and Nicholas Street Methodist societies combined to form the United Society, which met at the New Room from 3 June 1739. Wesley insisted that meetings at the New Room should only be held outside of Anglican church hours as he wanted Methodism to complement rather than compete with Anglican worship.

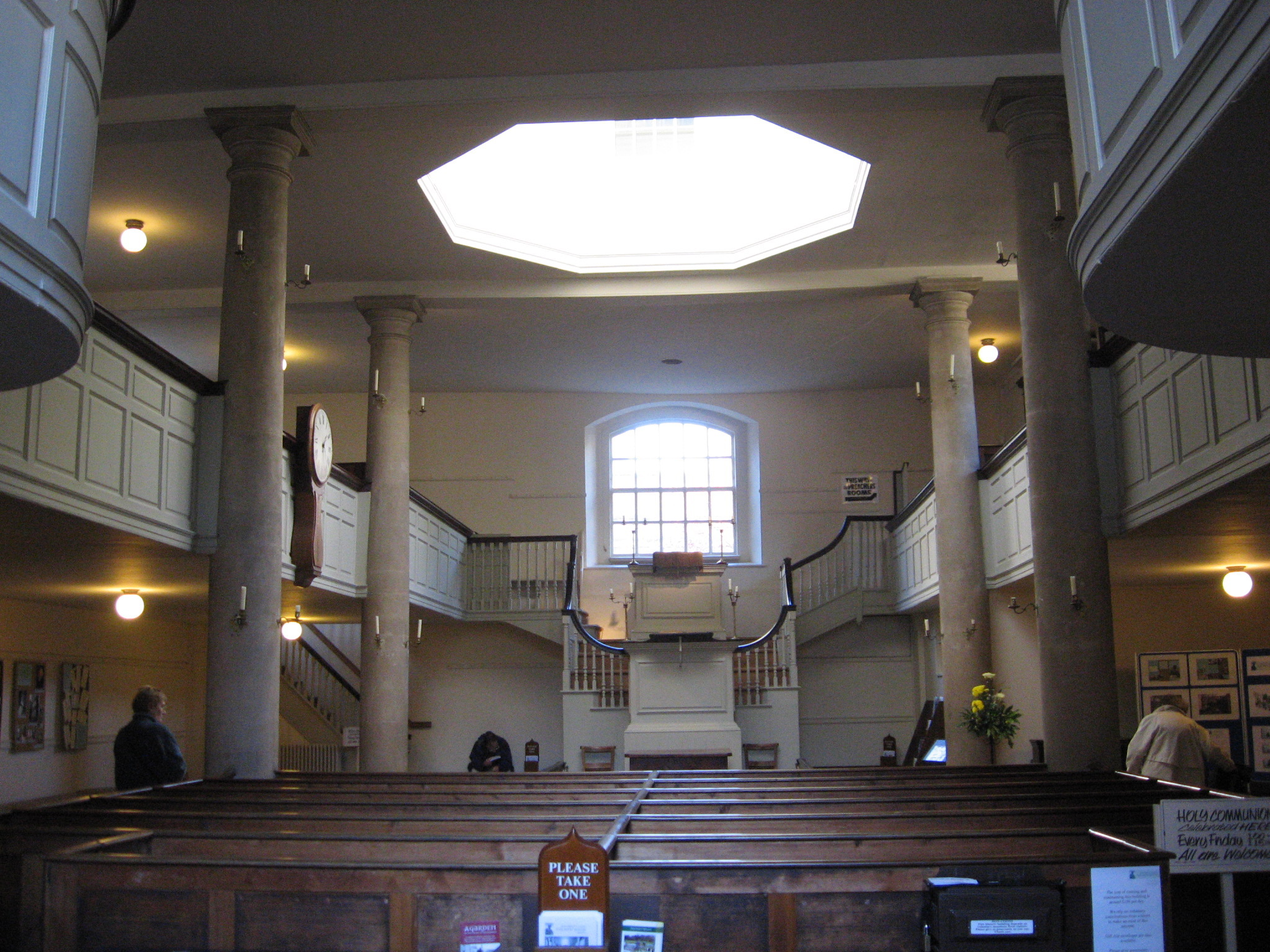
New Room interior

In 1748 it was extended, possibly by the Quaker architect George Tully in view of the stylistic similarities with the Friends' Meeting House at Quakers Friars of the same period. John Wesley believed that liturgical worship should be carried out in churches, and only reluctantly allowed the enlarged New Room to comply with the Toleration Act 1688, making it a formal place of worship. Rooms were built above the chapel, in which Wesley and other itinerant preachers stayed. Wesley lived at the New Room from 1748 to 1771 and administered Holy Communion there when his brother Charles was away. Wesley added to the Methodist offer in Bristol by selling his published works from a bookstore in the New Room. Analysis of the complete printed output of Bristol between 1695 and 1775 shows that over half was written by Methodists. Wesley published a medical handbook, Primitive Physick; the New Room housed one of Bristol's first medical dispensaries.

After Wesley's death, in 1808 the property passed into the hands of the Welsh Calvinistic Methodists. In 1929 it was bought back by the Wesleyan Methodist Church. The John Snetzler Chamber Organ of 1761 is a 20th-century addition following the restoration of the building in 1929 by Sir George Oatley.

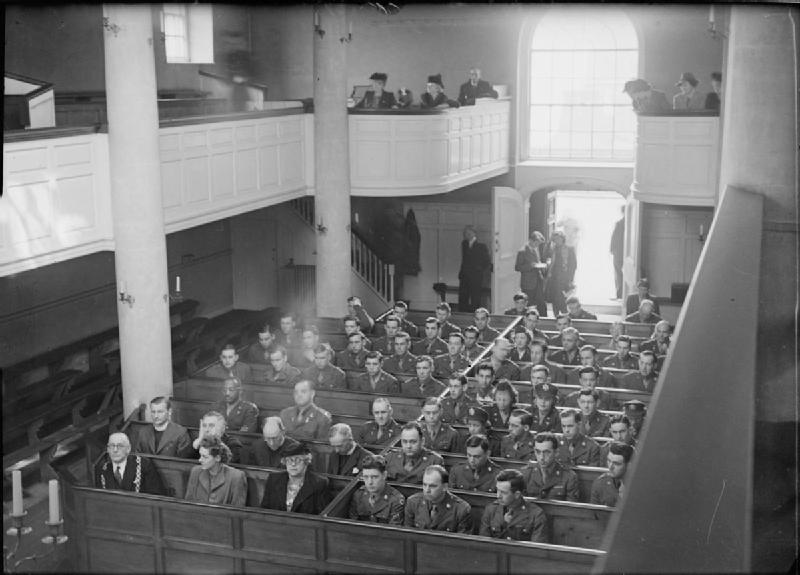
A general view of the interior of the chapel, just prior to the service taking place. The New Room was visited by American soldiers on 12 April 1945.

A garden in the Broadmead Courtyard was opened on 24 May 2011 by the Lord Mayor of Bristol. This was followed by the opening of the Horsefair Visitor Centre on 13 July 2017 by the Duke of Gloucester. The new facilities include a café, library and archive and conference and education facilities, plus an expanded interactive museum housed in the twelve upstairs rooms of the 1748 building. As the oldest purpose-built Methodist building in the world it has become a centre of international pilgrimage.

== Beliefs ==
=== Marriage ===
The church celebrates both opposite-sex marriages and same-sex marriages.

== See also ==
- Charles Wesley's House (Bristol)
- Wesley's Chapel (London)
- Churches in Bristol
- United Methodist Church, Berkeley Road, Bristol
- Grade I listed buildings in Bristol
