= John and Charles Wesley bibliography =

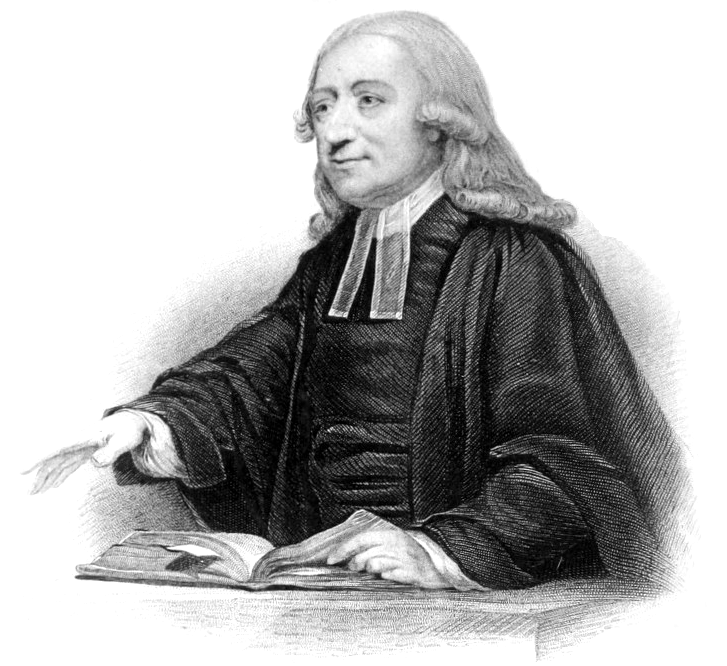
Frontispiece from one of Wesley works, Collection of Hymns, for the Use of the People Called Methodists

This is a list of works by John Wesley, a Christian cleric, theologian and evangelist, who founded the Methodist movement. Wesley produced hundreds of sermons, biblical commentaries, letters, tracts, treatises, and other works. As well as theology he wrote about music, marriage, medicine, abolitionism and politics. Wesley's prose, Works, were first collected by himself (32 vols., Bristol, 1771–74, frequently reprinted in editions varying greatly in the number of volumes). His chief prose works are a standard publication in seven octavo volumes of the Methodist Book Concern, New York. The Poetical Works of John and Charles, ed. G. Osborn, appeared in 13 vols., London, 1868–72.

== 1730s ==
- Wesley, John (1733). A collection of forms of prayer for every day in the week.
- Norris, John; Wesley, John (1734). A Treatise on Christian Prudence. Printed by W. Strahan.
- à Kempis, Thomas; Wesley, John (1735). The Christian's Pattern: or a Treatise of the Imitation of Christ. C. Rivington.
- Wesley, Samuel; Wesley, John (1735). Advice to a Young Clergyman. C. Rivington.
- Wesley, John (1735). A Sermon preached at St. Mary's in Oxford, on Sunday, September 21, 1735. C. Rivington.
- Wesley, Samuel; Wesley, John (1736). Dissertationes in Librum Jobi. William Bowyer.
- Wesley, John (1737). A Collection of Psalms and Hymns (PDF). Printed by Lewis Timothy.
- Wesley, John (1738). A Collection of Psalms and Hymns (PDF).
- Wesley, John (1738). A Sermon on Salvation by Faith. Printed by James Hutton.
- Wesley, John (1739). The Doctrine of Salvation, Faith, and Good Works. Extracted from the Homilies of the Church of England. Printed by James Hutton.
- Wesley, John (1739). An Abstract of the Life and Death of the Reverend Learned and Pious Thomas Halyburton, M.A., Professor of Divinity in the University of St. Andrews. John Oswald.
- Wesley, John (1739). Free Grace: A Sermon preach'd at Bristol. Printed by S. and F. Farley.
- Francke, August Hermann; Wesley, John (1739). Nicodemus: or, a Treatise on the Fear of Man. Written in German by August Herman Frank. Abridg'd by John Wesley, M.A., Fellow of Lincoln College, Oxford.
- Wesley, John (1739). An Extract of the Rev. Mr. John Wesley's Journal, from his embarking for Georgia to his return to London. Printed by S. and F. Farley.
- Wesley, John; Wesley, Charles (1739). Hymns and Sacred Poems (PDF). Printed by William Strahan.

== 1740s ==
- Watts, Isaac; Wesley, John (1740). Serious Considerations concerning the Doctrines of Election and Reprobation. Extracted from a late author. Printed by John Lewis.
- Law, William; Wesley, John (1740). The Nature and Design of Christianity. Printed by W. Strahan.
- Wesley, John (1740). An Extract of the Rev. Mr. John Wesley's Journal from Feb. 1, 1737–8, to his Return from Germany. Printed by W. Strahan.
- Wesley, John; Wesley, Charles (1740). Hymns and Sacred Poems (PDF). Printed by William Strahan.
- Wesley, John (1741). An Extract of the Life and Death of Mr. Haliburton. Printed by W. Strahan.
- Wesley, John (1741). An Extract of the Rev. Mr. John Wesley's Journal with regard to the Affidavit made by Captain Robert Williams.
- St. Jure, Jean Baptiste; Wesley, John (1741). An Extract of the Life of Monsieur de Renty. Printed by W. Strahan.
- Barclay, Robert; Wesley, John (1741). Serious Considerations on Absolute Predestination extracted from a late author. Printed by S. and F. Farley.
- Wesley, John (1741). A dialogue between a Predestinarian and his Friend. London: Printed by W. Strahan.
- Norris, John; Wesley, John (1741). Reflections upon the conduct of Human Life with references to Learning and Knowledge. Extracted from Mr. Norris.
- à Kempis, Thomas; Wesley, John (1741). An Extract of the Christian's Pattern: or, a Treatise of the Imitation of Christ. Written in Latin by Thomas a Kempis. W. Strahan.
- Wesley, John (1741). The Scripture Doctrine concerning Predestination, Election, and Reprobation. London: Printed by W. Strahan.
- Wesley, John (1741). The Almost Christian: A Sermon preached at St. Mary's, Oxford before the University, on July 25, 1741. London: Printed by W. Strahan.
- Wesley, John (1741). Christian Perfection: a Sermon preached by John Wesley, M.A., Fellow of Lincoln and Oxford. London: Printed by W. Strahan.
- Wesley, John (1741). A Collection of Psalms and Hymns. London: Printed by W. Strahan. first edition, second edition, third edition
- Wesley, John (1741). Hymns on God's Everlasting Love. To which is added the Cry of a Reprobate, and the Horrible Decree (PDF). London: Printed by S. and F. Farley.
- Wesley, John (1742). Hymns on God's Everlasting Love (PDF). London: Printed by W. Strahan.
- Wesley, John (1742). The Character of a Methodist. London: Printed by Felix Farley.
- Piers, Henry; Wesley, John (1742). A Sermon at Sevenoaks. London: Printed by W. Strahan.
- Wesley, John (1742). The Principles of a Methodist. London: Printed by Felix Farley.
- à Kempis, Thomas; Wesley, John (1742). A Companion for the Altar. Extracted from Thomas a Kempis. Felix Farley.
- Wesley, John (1742). An Extract of the Rev. Mr. John Wesley's Journal from August 12, 1738, to Nov. 1, 1739. Felix Farley.
- Wesley, John (1742). A Collection of Tunes set to Music, as they are Commonly Sung at the Foundery. London: Printed by A. Pearson.
- Wesley, John; Wesley, Charles (1742). Hymns and Sacred Poems (PDF). Printed by Felix Farley.
- Wesley, John (1742). A Collection of Hymns (PDF). Printed by W. Strahan.
- Wesley, John (1743). Thoughts on Marriage and a Single Life. London: Printed by Felix Farley.
- Wesley, John (1743). The Nature, Design, and General Rules of the United Societies in London, Bristol, Kingswood, and Newcastle upon Tyne. Printed by John Gooding.
- Wesley, John (1743). A Word in Season: or, Advice to a Soldier. London: Printed by John Gooding.
- Law, William; Wesley, John (1743). A Practical Treatise on Christian Perfection, Extracted from a late Author. John Gooding.
- Bunyan, John; Wesley, John (1743). The Pilgrim's Progress from this World to that which is to come. Abridged by John Wesley, M.A., Fellow of Lincoln College, Oxford. John Gooding.
- Wesley, John (1743). An earnest appeal to men of reason and religion. Bristol: Printed by Felix Farley.
- Law, William; Wesley, John (1744). A Serious Call to a Holy Life, Extracted from a late Author. John Gooding.
- Edwards, Jonathan; Wesley, John (1744). The Distinguishing Marks of a Work of the Spirit of God. Extracted from the Mr. Edwards, Minister of Northampton, in New England. John Gooding.
- von Zinzendorf, Nikolaus; Wesley, John (1744). An Extract of Count Zinzendorf's Discourses on the Redemption of Man by the Death of Christ. John Gooding.
- Scougall, Henry; Wesley, John (1744). The Life of God in the Soul of Man; or, the Nature and Excellency of the Christian Religion. Abridged by John Wesley, M.A., fellow of Lincoln College, Oxford. John Gooding.
- Whitefield, George; Wesley, John (1744). A Brief Account of the Occasion, Process, and Issue of a Late Tryal at the Assize, held at Gloucester, the third of March, 1743. Between some of the people call'd Methodists, Plaintiffs, and certain Persons of the Town of Minchin-Hampton, in the said county, Defendants. Extracted from Mr. Whitefield's Letter. By John Wesley, A.M., Fellow of Lincoln College, Oxford. John Gooding.
- Wesley, John (1744). An Extract of the Rev. Mr. John Wesley's Journal from Nov. 1 1739, to September 3, 1741. London: Printed by W. Strahan.
- Edwards, Jonathan; Wesley, John (1744). A Narrative of the Late Work of God at and near Northampton in New England. Extracted from the Mr. Edwards's Letter to Dr. Coleman. Felix Farley.
- Wesley, John (1744). Scriptural Christianity. A Sermon preached August 24, 1744, at St. Mary's Church in Oxford, before the University. London: Printed by W. Strahan.
- Wesley, John (1744). Rules of the Band Societies. Drawn up December 25, 1738. Directions given to the Band Societies, December 25, 1744.
- Wesley, John (1744). Hymns for Times of Trouble and Persecution. London. 1st edition, 2nd edition
- Wesley, John (1744). Hymns for Times of Trouble (PDF).
- Wesley, John (1744). A Hymn at the Sacrament.
- Wesley, John (1744). Moral and Sacred Poems. Bristol: Printed by Felix Farley. Volume I, Volume II, Volume III
- Wesley, John (1745). Instructions for Children. London.
- Wesley, John (1745). A Farther Appeal to Men of Reason and Religion. London: Printed by W. Strahan. part I, part II, part III
- Wesley, John (1745). An Answer to the Rev. Mr. Church's Remarks on the Rev. John Wesley's Journal. Bristol: Printed by Felix Farley.
- Edwards, Jonathan; Wesley, John (1745). Thoughts Concerning the Present Revival of Religion in New England. London: Printed by W. Strahan. , , ,
- Baxter, Richard; John, John (1745). An Extract of Mr. Baxter's Aphorisms of Justification. Newcastle upon Tyne: Printed by John Gooding.
- Wesley, John (1745). Short View of the Difference between the Moravian Brethren, lately in England, and the Reverend Mr. John and Charles Wesley. London: Printed by W. Strahan.
- Wesley, John (1745). A Collection of Receits for the Use of the Poor. Bristol: Printed by Felix Farley.
- Wesley, John (1745). A Dialogue between an Antinomian and his Friend. London: Printed by W. Strahan.
- Wesley, John (1745). A Second Dialogue between an Antinomian and his Friend. London: Printed by W. Strahan.
- Wesley, John (1745). Modern Christianity: Exemplified. Newcastle-upon-Tyne: Printed by John Gooding.
- Wesley, John (1745). Advice to the People called Methodists.
- Wesley, John (1745). A Collection of Prayers for Families.
- Wesley, John (1745). A Letter to the Author of the Craftsman.
- Wesley, John (1745). A Word in Season, or Advice to an Englishman.
- Wesley, John (1745). A Word to a Drunkard.
- Wesley, John (1745). "Swear not at All".
- Wesley, John (1745). A Word to a Sabbath Breaker.
- Wesley, John (1745). A Word to a Street Walker.
- Wesley, John (1745). A Word to a Condemned Malefactor.
- Wesley, John (1745). A Word to a Protestant.
- Wesley, John (1745). Hymns for the Nativity of our Lord (PDF).
- Wesley, John. Lessons for Children. (4 vols.)
- Wesley, John (1746). A Word of Advice to Saints and Sinners. London.
- Wesley, John (1746). The Principles of a Methodist Further Explain'd. London: Printed by W. Strahan.
- Wesley, John. Sermons on Several Occasions. London: Printed by W. Strahan.
- Hitchens, James; Wesley, John (1746). A Short Account of the Death of Samuel Hitchens. London.
- Wesley, John (1746). Hymns for our Lord's Resurrection (PDF). London: Printed by W. Strahan.
- Wesley, John (1746). Hymns for Ascension Day (PDF). Bristol: Printed by Felix Farley.
- Wesley, John; Wesley, Charles (1746). Hymns of Petition and Thanksgiving for the Promise of the Father. Bristol: Printed by Felix Farley.
- Wesley, John (1746). Gloria Patri, &c., or Hymns to the Trinity (PDF). Bristol.
- Wesley, John (1746). Hymns on the Great Festivals, and other Occasions (PDF). London.
- Wesley, John (1746). Hymns for the Public Thanksgiving Day (PDF). London.
- Wesley, John (1746). Funeral Hymns (PDF).
- Wesley, John (1746). Hymns for the Watchnight (PDF).
- Wesley, John (1746). Graces before Meat.
- Wesley, John (1747). Hymns for Children (PDF).
- Wesley, John (1747). Primitive Physick. London: Printed by Thomas Trye.
- Hitchens, James; Wesley, John (1747). A Short Account of the Death of Thomas Hitchens.
- Wesley, John (1747). A Letter to the Right Reverend the Lord Bishop of London. London: Printed by W. Strahan.
- Wesley, John (1747). A Word to a Freeholder.
- Wesley, John (1747). Hymns for Those that seek, and those that have, Redemption in the Blood of Jesus Christ. London: Printed by W. Strahan.
- Wesley, John (1747). Hymns and Sacred Poems (PDF). Dublin.
- Wesley, John (1748). A Letter to a Person lately join'd with the People call'd Quakers.
- Wesley, John (1748). A Word to a Methodist.
- Wesley, John (1748). A Letter to a Clergyman. Dublin: Printed by S. Powell.
- Wesley, John (1748). A Short Latin Grammar. Bristol: Printed by Felix Farley.
- Wesley, John (1748). A Short English Grammar. Bristol: Printed by Felix Farley.
- à Kempis, Thomas; Wesley, John (1748). Thomas a Kempis de Christo Imitando. Bristol: Printed by Felix Farley.
- Cordier, Mathurin; Wesley, John (1748). Mathurini Corderii Colloquia Selecta. Bristol: Printed by Felix Farley.
- Wesley, John (1748). Historiae et Praecepta Selecta. Bristol: Printed by Felix Farley.
- Wesley, John (1748). Instructiones Pueriles. Bristol: Printed by Felix Farley.
- Law, William; Wesley, John (1748). A Serious Answer to Dr. Trapp's Four Sermons. Cork: Printed by George Harrison.
- Wesley, John (1748). A Letter to a Friend concerning Tea. London: Printed by W. Strahan.
- Wesley, John (1748). An Extract of the Revd. Mr. John Wesley's Journal, form Sept. 3. 1741, to October 27, 1743. Bristol: Printed by Felix Farley.
- Wesley, John (1748). A Letter to the Reverend Doctor Conyers Middleton. Bristol: Printed by Felix Farley.
- Wesley, John (1749). A Plain Account of Genuine Christianity. Dublin: Printed by S. Powell.
- Fleury, Claude; Wesley, John (1749). The Manners of the Ancient Christians. Bristol: Printed by Felix Farley.
- Janeway, James; Wesley, John (1749). A Token for Children. Bristol: Printed by Felix Farley.
- Wesley, John (1749). Directions concerning Pronunciation and Gesture. Bristol: Printed by Felix Farley.
- Wesley, John (1749). A Plain Account of the People called Methodists. Bristol: Printed by Felix Farley.
- Wesley, John (1749). A Short Account of the School in Kingswood, near Bristol. Bristol: Printed by Felix Farley.
- Cripus, Gaius Sallustus; Wesley, John (1749). Caii Sallustii Crispi Bellum Catilinarum et Jugurthinum. Bristol: Printed by Felix Farley.
- Nepos, Cornelius; Wesley, John (1749). Cornelii Nepotis Excellentium Imperatorum Vitae. Bristol: Printed by Felix Farley.
- Wesley, John (1749). Excerpta ex Ovidio, VIrgilio, Horatio, Juvenali, Persio, et Martiali. Bristol: Printed Felix Farley.
- Wesley, John; Farley, Felix (1749). A christian library. Bristol: Printed by Felix Farley.
- Wesley, John (1749). An Answer to a Letter published in the Bath Journal. Bristol: Printed by Felix Farley.
- Wesley, John (1749). A Short Answer to the Inhabitant of Ireland. Dublin.
- Wesley, John (1749). A Letter to a Roman Catholick. Dublin: Printed by S. Powell.
- Wesley, John (1749). Minutes of some late Conversations between the Revd. M. Wsleys and Others (PDF). Dublin: Printed by S. Powell.
- von Zinzendorf, Nicolaus; Wesley, John (1749). Hymns composed for the use of the Brethren.

== 1750s ==
- Wesley, John (1750). A Letter to the Author of The Enthusiasm of Methodists and Papists Compar'd (PDF). London: Printed by H. Cock.
- Wesley, John (1750). A Compendium of Logick (PDF). Bristol: Printed by Felix Farley.
- Wesley, John (1750). A letter to the Revd. Mr. Baily, of Corke. Dublin: Printed by S. Powell.
- Phaedrus, Gaius Julius; Wesley, John (1750). Phaedrii Fabulae Selectae. Bristol: Printed by. Felix Farley.
- Erasmus, Desiderius; Wesley, John (1750). Desiderii Erasmi Roterodami Colloqia Selecta. Bristol: Printed by Felix Farley.
- Wesley, John (1750). Hymns for New Year's Day, 1750. Bristol: Printed by Felix Farley.
- Wesley, John (1751). Thoughts upon Infant Baptism (PDF). Bristol: Printed by Felix Farley.
- Wesley, John (1751). A Short Hebrew Grammar. London: Printed by William Bowyer.
- Wesley, John (1751). A Short French Grammar. London: Printed by William Bowyer.
- Wesley, John (1751). A Second Letter to the Author of The Enthusiasm of Methodists and Papists Compar'd. London: Printed by H. Cock.
- Wesley, John (1751). Serious Thoughts upon the Perseverance of the Saints (PDF). London.
- Wesley, John (1752). A Second Letter to the Lord Bishop of Exeter. London: Printed by H. Cock.
- Wesley, John (1752). Predestination Calmy Considered (PDF). London: Printed by William Bowyer.
- Wesley, John (1752). A Short Method of Converting all the Roman Catholics in the Kingdom of Ireland (PDF). Dublin.
- Wesley, John (1752). Serious Thoughts concerning Godfathers and Godmothers.
- Wesley, John (1752). Some Account of the Life and Death of Matthew Lee. London.
- Wheatley, James; Wesley, John (1753). An Extract of the Life and Death of Mr. John Janeway. London: Printed by Henry Cock.
- Wesley, John (1753). An Extract of the Reverend John Wesley's Journal, from October 27, 1743, to November 1746. London: Printed by H. Cock.
- Wesley, John (1753). The Advantage of the Members of the Church of England over those of the Church of Rome (PDF). Bristol: Printed by Felix Farley.
- Wesley, John (1753). The Complete English Dictionary. London: Printed by W. Strahan.
- Whateley, William; Wesley, John (1753). Directions for Married Persons. Bristol: Printed by Felix Farley.
- Wesley, John (1753). Minutes of Several Conversations between the Reverend Mr. John and Charles Wesley, and others.
- Wesley, John (1753). Hymns and Spiritual Songs (PDF). London: Printed by W. Strahan.
- Wesley, John (1754). An Extract from the Reverend Mr. John Wesley's Journal, from November 25, 1746, to July 20, 1750. London: Printed by H. Cock.
- Wesley, John (1754). An Answer to all which the Revd. Dr. Gill has Printed on the Final Perseverance of te Saints (PDF). London.
- Wesley, John (1755). Queries Humbly Proposed to the Right Reverend and Right Honoruable Count Zinzendorf (PDF). London.
- Wesley, John (1755). Catholick Spirit. London: Printed by H. Cock.
- Wesley, John (1755). Serious Thoughts Occasioned by the late Earthquake at Lisbon. London.
- Wesley, John (1755). The New Testament, with explanatory notes. London: W. Nicholson.
- Wesley, John (1755). Explanatory Notes on the New Testament. Bristol: William Pine.
- Wesley, John (1756). A Letter to the Reverend Mr. Law (PDF). London.
- Wesley, John (1756). An Address to the Clergy (PDF). London.
- Wesley, John (1756). An Extract from the Reverend Mr. John Wesley's Journal, from July 20, 1749, to October 30, 1751. London.
- Davies, Samuel; Wesley, John (1756). The Good Soldier (attributed). London.
- Wesley, John (1756). A Roman Catechism, with a Reply thereto (PDF).
- Wesley, John (1756). A Word to those Freemen of the Establish'd Church who make the Scriptures the one Rule of their Faith and Practice (attributed).
- Wesley, John (1757). The Doctrine of Original Sin (PDF). Bristol: William Pine. (in reply to Dr. John Taylor of Norwich)
- Wesley, John (1757). A Sufficient Answer to Letters to the Author of Theron and Aspasio (PDF). Bristol: Printed by E. Farley.
- Wesley, John (1758). A Letter to a Gentleman in Bristol (PDF). Bristol: Printed by E. Farley.
- Wesley, John (1758). The Great Assize (PDF). London: Printed by T. Trye.
- Wesley, John (1758). A Letter to the Rev. Dr. Free. Bristol: Printed by E. Farley and Son.
- Wesley, John (1758). A Second Letter to the Rev. Dr. Free. Bristol: Printed by E. Farley and Son.
- Wesley, John (1758). A Short Account of the Life and Death of Nathaniel Othen. Bristol: Printed by John Grabham.
- Wesley, John (1758). A Letter to the Rev. Mr. Potter. London.
- Wesley, John (1758). The Case of the Unhappy People in Custrin (attributed).
- Wesley, John (1758). A Preservative against Unsettled Notions in Religion. Bristol: Printed by E. Farley.
- Wesley, John (1758). Hymns of Intercession for all Mankind. Bristol: Printed by E. Farley.
- Hopkins, Ezekiel; Wesley, John (1759). A Short Exposition of the Ten Commandments. Bristol: Printed by F. Farley.
- Wesley, John (1759). An Extract of the Rev. Mr. John Wesley's Journal from July xx, 1750, to October xxviii, 1754. London.
- Wesley, John (1759). A Letter to the Rev. Mr. Downes. London.
- Wesley, John (1759). A Sermon on Original Sin. Bristol: Printed by John Grabham.

== 1760s ==
- Wesley, John (1760). The Desideratum; or, Electricity Made Plain and Useful. London: Bailliere, Tindall, and Cox.
- Wesley, John (1761). An Extract of the Rev. Mr. John Wesley's Journal, from February 16, 1755, to June 16, 1758. Bristol: Printed by William Pine.
- Wesley, John (1761). Hymns for those to whom Christ is All in All. London.
- Wesley, John (1761). Select Hymns: With Tunes Annext: Designed Chiefly for the use of the People called Methodists. London.
- Wesley, John (1761). Sacred Melody: or A Choice Collection of Psalm and Hymn Tunes, with a Short Introduction.
- Wesley, John (1761). The Grounds of Vocal Music.
- Wesley, John (1761). Select Hymns for the Use of Christians of all Denominations. Bristol: Printed by William Pine. first edition second edition
- Wesley, John (1762). A Letter to the Rev. Mr. Horne. London.
- Wesley, John (1762). The Dignity of Human Nature.
- Wesley, John (1762). Thoughts on the Imputed Righteousness of Christ. Dublin: Printed by S. Powell.
- Wesley, John (1762). A Blow at the Root. Bristol: Printed by William Pine.
- Wesley, John (1762). Cautions and Directions given to the greatest Professors in the Methodist Societies (PDF).
- Morgan, James; Wesley, John (1762). The Life and Death of Mr. Thomas Walsh. Composed in great Part from the Accounts left by Himself. London: Printed by H. Cock.
- Wesley, John (1763). A Letter to the Right Reverend the Bishop of Gloucester, Occasioned by his Tract on the Office and Operations of the Holy Spirit (PDF). London.
- Wesley, John (1763). A Sermon Preached before the Society for Reformation of Manners. London.
- Wesley, John (1763). A Discourse on Sin in Believers. London.
- Wesley, John (1763). Farther Thoughts upon Christian Perfection. London.
- Wesley, John (1763). A survey of the wisdom of God in the creation : or a compendium of natural philosophy. Bristol: William Pine.
- Wesley, John (1763). Minutes of Several Conversations between the Rev. Mr. John and Charles Wesley, and Others. London.
- Milton, John; Wesley, John (1763). An Extract from Milton's Paradise Lost (PDF). London: Printed by Henry Fenwick.
- Wesley, John (1764). An Extract of the Rev. Mr. John Wesley's Journal from June 17, 1758 to May 5, 1760. Bristol: Printed by William Pine.
- Cooper, Jane; Wesley, John (1764). Letters wrote by Jane Cooper. London.
- Goodwin, John; Wesley, John (1765). A Treatise on Justification. Bristol: Printed by William Pine.
- Wesley, John (1765). An Answer to all that in Material in Letters just Published under the Name of the Reverend Mr. Hervey. Bristol: Printed by William Pine.
- Wesley, John (1765). Thoughts on a Single Life (PDF). London.
- Wesley, John (1765). A Short History of Methodism (PDF). London.
- Wesley, John (1765). The Scripture-Way of Salvation (PDF). London.
- Pembroke, John; Wesley, John (1765). The Christian's Pocket Companion.
- Wesley, John (1765). Minutes of some Late Conversations, between the Rev. Mr Wesleys and Others. Bristol: Printed by William Pine.
- Wesley, John (1765). A Short Greek Grammar. Londonl: Printed by William Bowyer.
- Wesley, John (1765). Explanatory Notes upon the Old Testament. Bristol: William Pine.
- Wesley, John (1766). The Lord our Righteousness. London.
- Wesley, John (1766). Some Remarks on a Defence of the Preface to the Edinburgh Edition of Aspasio Vindicated. Edinburgh: Printed by Auld and Smellie.
- Wesley, John (1766). Minutes of some late Conversations between the Reverend Mr. Wesley and Others.
- Wesley, John (1766). A Plain Account of Christian Perfection. Bristol: Printed by William Pine.
- Wesley, John (1767). A Word to a Smuggler. Bristol: Printed by William Pine.
- Wesley, John (1767). An Extract of the Rev. Mr. John Wesley's Journal from May 6, 1760 to Oct. 1762. Bristol: Printed by William Pine.
- Alleine, Joseph; Wesley, John (1767). Christian Letters. London.
- Wesley, John (1767). The Witness of the Spirit. Bristol: Printed by William Pine.
- Tissot, Samuel-Auguste; Wesley, John (1767). Thoughts on the Sin of Onan. London.
- Wesley, John (1767). Minutes of Some Late Conversations between Rev. Mr. Wesley and Others. London.
- Wesley, John (1768). An Extract of the Rev. Mr. John Wesley's Journal from October 29, 1762 to May 25, 1765. Bristol: Printed by William Pine.
- Wesley, John (1768). The Repentance of Believers. London.
- Wesley, John (1768). A Letter of the Reverend Dr. Rutherforth. Bristol: Printed by William Pine.
- Gilbert, Mary; Wesley, John (1768). An Extract of Miss Mary Gilbert's Journal. Chester: Printed by J. Harvie.
- Wesley, John (1768). The Good Steward, a Sermon. Newcastle upon Tyne: Printed by J. White and T. Saint.
- Law, William; Wesley, John (1768). An Extract from the Rev. Mr. Law's later works. Bristol: Printed by William Pine.
- Brainerd, David; Wesley, John (1768). An Extract of the Life of the Later Rev. Mr. David Brainerd (PDF). Bristol: Printed by William Pine.
- Tissot, Samuel-Auguste; Wesley, John (1769). Advices with Respect to Health. Bristol: Printed by William Pine.
- Harper, Elizabeth; Wesley, John (1769). An Extract from the Journal of Elizabeth Harper. London.
- Lefevre, L.; Wesley, John (1769). An Extract of Letters by Mrs. L *** (PDF). Bristol: Printed by William Pine.

== 1770s ==
- Olivers, Thomas; Wesley, John (1775). A Short Account of the Death of Mary Langson, of Taxall, in Cheshire.
- Wesley, John (1770). The Question, What is an Arminian? Answered. Bristol: Printed by William Pine.
- Toplady, Augustus; Wesley, John (1770). The Doctrine of Absolute Predestination Stated and Asserted. By the Reverend Mr. A ---- T. ----. Bristol: Printed by William Pine.
- Jackson, Eliza; Wesley, John (1770). Some Account of the Experience of E. J. London: Printed by J.and W. Oliver.
- Johnson, John; Wesley, John (1770). A Short Account of Ann Rogers. London: Printed by J.and W. Oliver.
- Wesley, John (1770). Free Thoughts on the Present State of Public Affairs. London: Printed by J. and W. Oliver.
- Wesley, John (1770). A Sermon on the Death of the Rev. Mr. George Whitefield. London: Printed by J. and W. Oliver.
- Wesley, John (1770). Minutes of some Late Conversations between the Rev. Mr. Wesley and Others (PDF). Bristol: Printed by William Pine.
- Wesley, John (1770). Minutes of Several Conversations between the Reverend Messieurs John and Charles Wesley and others. London.
- Young, Edward; Wesley, John (1770). An Extract from Dr. Young's Night-Thoughts on Life, Death, and Immorality (PDF). Bristol: Printed by William Pine.
- Wesley, John (1771). An Extract of the Rev. Mr. John Wesley's Journal, from May 27, 1765, to May 18, 1768. London: Printed by J. and W. Oliver.
- Dillon, John; Wesley, John (1771). A Short Account of John Dillon. Bristol: Printed by William Pine.
- Wesley, John (1771). A Letter to the Rev. Mr. Fleury. Dublin.
- Wesley, John (1771). A Defence of the Minute of Conference (1770) Relating to Calvinism. Dublin.
- Wesley, John (1771). The Consequence Proved (PDF). London.
- Wesley, John (1771). Minutes of some Late Conversations between the Rev. Mr. Wesley and Others. Bristol: Printed by William Pine.
- Wesley, John (1771–1774). Works. 32 volumes. Bristol: William Pine. (This edition has many errors) Volume I Volume II Volume III Volume IV Volume V Volume VI Volume VII Volume VIII Volume IX Volume X Volume XI Volume XII Volume XIII Volume XIV Volume XV Volume XVI Volume XVII Volume XVIII Volume XIX Volume XX Volume XXI Volume XXII Volume XXIII Volume XXIV Volume XXV Volume XXVI Volume XXVII Volume XXVIII Volume XXIX Volume XXX Volume XXXI Volume XXXII
- Wesley, John (1772). Thoughts upon Liberty (PDF). London.
- Wesley, John (1772). Thoughts Concerning the Origin of Power (PDF). Bristol: Printed by William Pine.
- Wesley, John (1772). Prayers for Children (PDF). Bristol: Printed by William Pine.
- Wesley, John (1772). Minutes of some Late Conversations between the Rev. Mr. Wesley and Others. Leeds: Printed by J. Bowling.
- Wesley, John (1772). Some Remarks on Mr. Hill's Review of all the Doctrines taught by Mr. John Wesley (PDF). Bristol: Printed by William Pine.
- Johnson, John; Wesley, John (1772). A Short Account of Ann Johnson.
- Wesley, John (1773). Thoughts on the Present Scarcity of Provisions (PDF). London: Printed by R. Hawes.
- Wesley, John (1773). Some Remarks on Mr. Hill's Farrago Double-Distilled (PDF). Bristol: Printed by William Pine.
- Mooney, Nicolas; Wesley, John (1773). Some Account of the Life and Death of Nicolas Mooney. London: Printed by R. Hawes.
- Wesley, John (1773). A Short Roman History. Bristol: Printed by William Pine.
- Wesley, John (1773). A Sermon on Romans viii. 29, 30. London: Printed by R. Hawes.
- Wesley, John (1773). Minutes of some Late Conversations between the Rev. Mr. Wesley and Others. London: Printed by Robert Hawes.
- Gilbert, Mary; Wesley, John (1773). A Short Account of the Life and Death of Miss Alice Gilbert. London: Printed by R. Hawes.
- Knight, James; Wesley, John (1773). An Extract of Two Discourses on the Conflagration and Renovation of the World. London.
- Edwards, Jonathan; Wesley, John (1773). An Extract from a Treatise Concerning Religious Affections. Bristol.
- Wesley, John (1773). Christian Reflections.
- Wesley, John (1773). Instructions for Members of Religious Societies.
- Herbert, George; Wesley, John (1773). Select Parts of Mr. Herbert's Sacred Poems (PDF). London: Printed by R. Hawes.
- Wesley, John (1774). Thoughts upon Slavery (PDF). London: Printed by Robert Hawes.
- Wesley, John (1774). A Sermon, preached at the opening of the New Meeting-House, at Wakefield, on the 28th of April, 1774. Leeds.
- Wesley, John (1774). Thoughts upon Necessity (PDF). London: Printed by Robert Hawes.
- Wesley, John (1774). An Extract of the Rev. Mr. John Wesley's Journal, from May 14, 1768, to September 1st, 1770. London: Printed by Robert Hawes.
- Wesley, John (1774). Minutes of some Late Conversations between the Rev. Mr. Wesley and Others. Bristol: Printed by William Pine.
- Cardogan, William; Wesley, John (1774). An Extract from Dr. Cardogan's Dissertation on the Gout and all Chronic Diseases.
- Fletcher, John; Wesley, John (1774). The First Part of an Equal Check to Pharisaism and Antinomianism. Bristol: Printed by William Pine.
- Wesley, John (1775). A Calm Address to our American Colonies (PDF). Bristol: Printed by Bonner and Middleton.
- Wesley, John (1775). A Sermon on 1st John v. 7. Dublin: Printed by William Kidd.
- Wesley, John (1775). Minutes of some Late Conversations between the Rev. Mr. Wesley and Others. Leeds: Printed by J. Bowling.
- Wesley, John (1775). The Important Question: A Sermon Preached in Taunton, Somersetshire. London: Printed by J. Moore and Co.
- Wesley, John (1775). A Sermon Preached at St. Matthew's Bethnal-Green, on Sunday, Nov. 12, 1775. London: Printed by R. Hawes.
- Wesley, John (1776). Some Observations on Liberty (PDF). Edinburgh.
- Wesley, John (1776). A Seasonable Address to the More Serious Part, of the Inhabitants of Great Britain, respecting the unhappy Contest between us and our American Brethren: With an Occasional World Interspersed to those of a Different Complexion. Bristol: Printed by William Pine.
- Wesley, John (1776). Minutes of some Late Conversations between the Rev. Mr. Wesley and Others. London: Printed by R. Hawes.
- Wesley, John (1776). A Concise History of England. Bristol: Printed by Robert Hawes. Volume I Volume II Volume III Volume IV
- Guyon, Jeanne; Wesley, John (1776). An Extract of the Life of Madame Guion. London: Printed by R. Hawes.
- Cross, Thomas; Wesley, John (1776). An Account of the Deliverance of Thomas Cross. London: Printed by R. Hawes.
- Baxter, Richard; Wesley, John (1776). The Saints' Everlasting Rest. London: Printed by R. Hawes.
- Wesley, John (1777). A Calm Address to the Inhabitants of England. London: Printed by J. Fry and Co.
- Wesley, John (1777). A Sermon on Numbers xxiii. 23. London: Printed by J. Fry and Co.
- Wesley, John (1777). An Extract from the Rev. Mr. John Wesley's Journal, from Sep. 2, 1770 to Sep.12 1773. London: Printed by Robert Hawes.
- Wesley, John (1777). Thoughts upon God's Sovereignty. London: Printed by J. Fry and Co.
- Wesley, John (1777). An Answer to Mr. Rowland Hill's Tract entitled "Imposture Detected.". London: Printed by J. Fry and Co.
- Wesley, John (1777). Minutes of some Late Conferences. Bristol: Printed by William Pine.
- Wesley, John (1777). Proposals for printing by subscription the Arminian Magazine.
- Bayley, Cornelius; Wesley, John (1777). A Short Account of the Death of Elizabeth Hindmarsh. London: Printed by Robert Hawes.
- Wesley, John (1777). A Sermon preached November 23, 1777, in Lewisham Church, before the Humane Society. London: Printed by J. Fry and Co.
- Wesley, John (1778). A Letter to the Reverend Thomas Maxfield, Occasioned by a late Publication. London: Printed by J. Fry and Co.
- Wesley, John (1778). A Serious Address to the People of England, with regard to the State of the Nation. London: Printed by R. Hawes.
- Wesley, John (1778). A Compassionate Address to the Inhabitants of Ireland. Belfast: Printed by James Magee.
- Wesley, John (1778). A Call to Backsliders. Dublin.
- Jarratt, Devereux; Wesley, John (1778). A Brief Narrative of the Revival of Religion in Virginia. London: Printed by Robert Hawes.
- Wesley, John (1778). Some Account of the Late Work of God in North America. London: Printed by R. Hawes.
- Wesley, John (1778). Minutes of some Late Conversations between the Rev. Mr. John Wesley and Others. Leeds: Printed by James Bowling.
- Wesley, John (1778). Minutes of the Conference. Dublin.
- Wesley, John (1778–1791). The Arminian Magazine. London: Printed by J. Fry and Co. 1778 1779 1780 1781 1782 1783 1784 1785 1786 1787 1788 1789 1790 1791
- Wesley, John (1778). An Answer to Several Objections against this Work. In a letter to a friend.
- Wesley, John (1779). An Extract of the Rev. Mr. John Wesley's Journal, from September 13th, 1773, to January 2nd, 1776. London: Printed by Robert Hawes.
- Wesley, John (1779). Popery Calmy Considered. London: Printed by Robert Hawes.
- Wesley, John (1779). Minutes of Some Late Conversations, &c. at London. Tuesday, August 3d, 1779 (PDF). London: Printed by R. Hawes.

== 1780s ==
- Wesley, John (1780). A Letter to the Printer of the "Public Advertiser.".
- Wesley, John (1780). An Account of the Conduct of the War in the Middle Colonies. Extracted from a late Author. London.
- Wesley, John (1780). Reflections on the Rise and Progress of the American Rebellion. London: Printed by J. Paramore.
- Wesley, John (1780). A Letter to Mr. John Whittingham. Printed by Robert Hawes.
- Wesley, John (1780). Minutes of some Late Conversations between the Rev.Mr. John and Charles Wesley and Others. Begun at Bristol, Tuesday, August 1, 1780. Bristol: Printed by William Pine.
- Wesley, John (1780). Minutes of some Late Conversations between the Rev.Mr. John and Charles Wesley and Others. From the year 1744 to the year 1780. London: Printed by J. Paramore.
- Wesley, John (1780). Directions for Renewing our Covenant with God. London: Printed by J. Paramore.
- Wesley, John (1780). A Collections of Hymns for the Use of the People called Methodists. London: Printed by J. Paramore.
- Wesley, John (1781). A Letter to the Printer of the "Public Advertiser," Occasioned by the late Act passed in Favour of Popery. London: Printed by J. Paramore.
- Mitchell, Thomas; Wesley, John (1781). A Short Account of the Life of Thomas Mitchell. London: Printed by J. Paramore.
- Brooke, Henry; Wesley, John (1781). The History of Henry, Earl of Moreland. London: Printed by J. Paramore. Volume I Volume II
- Galloway, Joseph; Wesley, John (1781). An Extract from a Reply to the Observations of Lieut. Gen. Sir William Howe, on a Pamphlet entitled, Letters to a Nobleman. London: Printed by J. Paramore.
- Howe, John; Wesley, John (1781). An Extract of a Letter to the Right Honourable Lord Viscount H * * e on his Naval Conduct in the American War. London: Printed by J. Paramore.
- Wesley, John (1781). Minutes of some Late Conversations between the Rev. Mr. John Wesley and Others. Leeds: Printed by James Bowling.
- von Mosheim, Johann Lorenz; Maclaine, Archibald; Wesley, John (1781). A Concise Ecclesiastical History. London: Printed by J. Paramore.
- Wesley, John (1781). Sacred Harmony: Or a choice collection of Psalms and Hymns. Set to Music in two and three parts, for the Voice, Harpsichord, and Organ.
- Wesley, John (1782). An Estimate of the Manners of the Present Times. London.
- Nelson, John; Wesley, John (1782). An Extract from John Nelson's Journal. Being an Account of God's Dealing with him from his Youth to the Forty-Second Year of his Age. London: Printed by J. Paramore.
- Alleine, Joseph; Wesley, John (1782). An Alarm to Unconverted Sinners. London: Printed by J. Paramore.
- Baxter, Richard; Wesley, John (1782). A Call to the Unconverted. London: Printed by J. Paramore.
- Wesley, John (1782). Minutes of some Late Conversations between the Rev. Mr. John Wesley and Others. London: Printed by J. Paramore.
- Wesley, John (1782). Hymns for the National Fast. London: Printed by J. Paramore.
- Wesley, John (1782). Hymns for the Nation in 1782 part I.
- Wesley, John (1782). Hymns for the Nation in 1782 part II.
- Wesley, John (1783). An Extract from the Rev. Mr. John Wesley's Journal. From January 1, 1776, to August 8, 1779. London: Printed by J. Paramore.
- Wesley, John (1783). The Case of the Birstal House.
- Wesley, John (1783). Minutes of some Late Conversations between the Rev. Mr. Wesley and Others. Dublin, Tuesday, April, 29, 1783.
- Wesley, John (1783). Minutes of some Late Conversations between the Rev. Mr. Wesley and Others. Bristol: Printed by William Pine.
- Boston, Thomas; Wesley, John (1784). The Doctrine of Original Sin. Extracted from a Late Author. London: Printed by J. Paramore.
- Coke, Thomas; Wesley, John (1784). Minutes of some Late Conversations between the Rev. Mr. Thomas Coke, LL.D., and Others. Dublin.
- Wesley, John (1784). Minutes of some Late Conversations between the Rev. Mr. John Wesley and Others. Leeds: Printed by James Bowling.
- Wesley, John (1784). The Sunday Service of the Methodists in the United States of America. With other Occasional Services. Bristol.
- Wesley, John (1784). A Collection of Psalms and Hymns for the Lord's Day (PDF). London.
- Haime, John; Wesley, John (1785). A Short Account of God's Dealings with Mr. John Haime. London: Printed by J. Paramore.
- Wesley, John (1785). Minutes of some Late Conversations between the Rev. Mr. John Wesley M.A. and Others. Dublin.
- Wesley, John (1785). Minutes of some Late Conversations between the Rev. Mr. John Wesley and Others (PDF). London: Printed by J. Paramore.
- Wesley, John (1785). A Sermon Preached on Occasion of the Death of the Rev. Mr. John Fletcher, Vicar of Madeley, Shropshire. London: Printed by J. Paramore.
- Wesley, John (1785). A Pocket Hymn-Book for the Use of Christians of all Denominations (PDF). London: Printed by J. Paramore.
- Wesley, John (1786). An Extract from the Rev. Mr. John Wesley's Journal. From August 9, 1779, to August 26, 1782. London: Printed by J. Paramore.
- Coke, Thomas; Wesley, John (1786). Minutes of some Late Conversations between the Rev. Thomas Coke, LL.D., and Others. Dublin.
- Wesley, John (1786). Minutes of some Late Conversations between the Rev. Messrs. Wesley and Others (PDF). Bristol: Printed by Bulgin and Rosser.
- Wesley, John (1786). A Short Account of the Life and Death of the Rev. John Fletcher. London: Printed by J. Paramore.
- Wesley, John (1786). The Sunday Service of the Methodists in His Majesty's Dominions. London: Printed by Frys and Couchman.
- Bonnet, Charles; Wesley, John (1787). Conjectures concerning the Nature of Future Happiness. Translated from the French of Mons. Bonnet of Geneva. Dublin: Printed by B. Dugdale.
- Wesley, John (1787). Minutes of some Late Conversations between the Rev. Mr. John Wesley, M. A., and others. Dublin: Printed by B. Dugdale.
- Wesley, John (1787). Minutes of some Late Conversations between the Rev. J. Wesley and Others (PDF). London: Printed by J. Paramore.
- Wesley, John (1787). A Pocket Hymn Book, for the Use of Christians of all Denominations (PDF). London: Printed by J. Paramore.
- Coke, Thomas; Wesley, John (1788). Minutes of some Late Conversations between the Rev. Thomas Coke, LL.D., and Others. Dublin: Printed by B. Dugdale.
- Wesley, John (1788). Minutes of some Late Conversations between the Rev. J. Wesley and Others. London: Printed by J. Paramore.
- Wesley, John (1789). An Extract of thf. Rev. Mr. John Wesley's Journal, from September 4, 1782, to June 28, 1786. London: Printed and sold at the New Chapel in the City Road; and at the Rev. Mr. Wesley's Preaching-Houses in Town and Country.
- Wesley, John (1789). Minutes of some late Conversations between the Rev. John Wesi.ey, M.A., and Others. Dublin: Printed by B. Dugdale.
- Wesley, John (1789). Minutes of some late Conversations between the Rev. Mr. Wesley and Others. Leeds.
- Wesley, John (1789). The Case of Dewsbury House.
- Wesley, John (1789). Minutes of Several Conversations between the Rev. Mr. Wesley and Others, from the Year 1744 to the Year 1789. London: Printed for the Author, and sold at the New Chapel, City Road, and at the Rev. Mr. Wesley's Preaching-Houses in Town and Country. 1789.

== 1790s ==
- Told, Silas; Wesley, John (1790). The Life of Mr. Silas Told. London: Printed by J. Paramore.
- Hamilton, James; Wesley, John (1790). A Sermon, preached at Leeds, July 29th, 1789, before the Methodist Preachers (assembled in Conference) and a large body of the people in connection with them; and now published at the request of many of the hearers. By James Hamilton, M.D., Fellow of the Royal College of Physicians of Edinburgh. London.
- Wesley, John (1790). A Short Account of the Life and Death of Jane Newland. London.
- Coke, Thomas; Wesley, John (1790). Minutes of some Late Conversations between the Rev. Thomas Coke, LL.D., and Others. Dublin: Printed by B. Dugdale.
- Wesley, John (1790). Minutes of some Late Conversations between the Rev. Mr. Wesley and Others. Bristol.
- Wesley, John (1790). The New Testament, with an Analysis of the several Books and Chapters. London: Printed and sold at the New Chapel, City- Road; and at the Rev. J. Wesley's Preaching-Houses in Town and Country.
- Wesley, John. The Rules of the Strangers' Friends Society in Bristol.
- Wesley, John (1790). Hymns for Children (PDF). London: Printed and sold at the New Chapel, City-Road.
- Wesley, John (1791). An Extract of the Rev. Mr. John Wesley's Journal, from June 29, 1786, to Oct. 24, 1790. London: Printed by J. Paramore.
- Wesley, John (1791). Minutes of Several Conversations between the Preachers Late in Connection with the Rev. Mr. Wesley (PDF). Manchester: Printed by T. Harper.

== Posthumous ==
- Wesley, John (1809–1813). Works. 17 volumes. Joseph Benson. (This is better than the preceding, but is still very erroneus.) Volume I Volume III Volume IV Volume V Volume VI Volume VII Volume VIII Volume IX Volume X Volume XI Volume XII Volume XIII Volume XIV Volume XV Volume XVI Volume XVII
- Wesley, John (1827). Works. 14 volumes. Thomas Jackson. (At present, the standard edition.)
- Wesley, John (1831a). Works. John Emory. (in seven volumes, combining two volumes of the Jackson Edition into one. Containing two extra letters and more footnotes.) Volume I Volume II Volume III Volume IV Volume V Volume VI Volume VII
- Wesley, John (1831b). Works. John Emory. (in 15 volumes the Jackson Edition with an additional volume containing his Notes to the New Testament)
- Wesley, John; Wesley, Charles; Osborn, G. (1868–1871). The poetical works of John and Charles Wesley. London.
- Wesley, John (1739–1789). Journals. 20 parts. (originally published in 20 parts) Volume I Volume II Volume III Volume IV Volume V Volume VI Volume VII Volume VIII Volume IX Volume X Volume XI Volume XII Volume XIII
- Wesley, John (1909–1911). Journals. 8 volumes. Nehemiah Curnock. (containing notes from unpublished diaries) Volume I Volume II Volume III Volume IV Volume V Volume VI Volume VII Volume VIII
- Wesley, John (1931). Letters. 8 volumes. John Telford. (containing notes from unpublished diaries)

== See also ==
- Sermons of John Wesley
