= Horfield =

Suburb of Bristol, England

Coordinates: 51.4900°N 2.5805°W

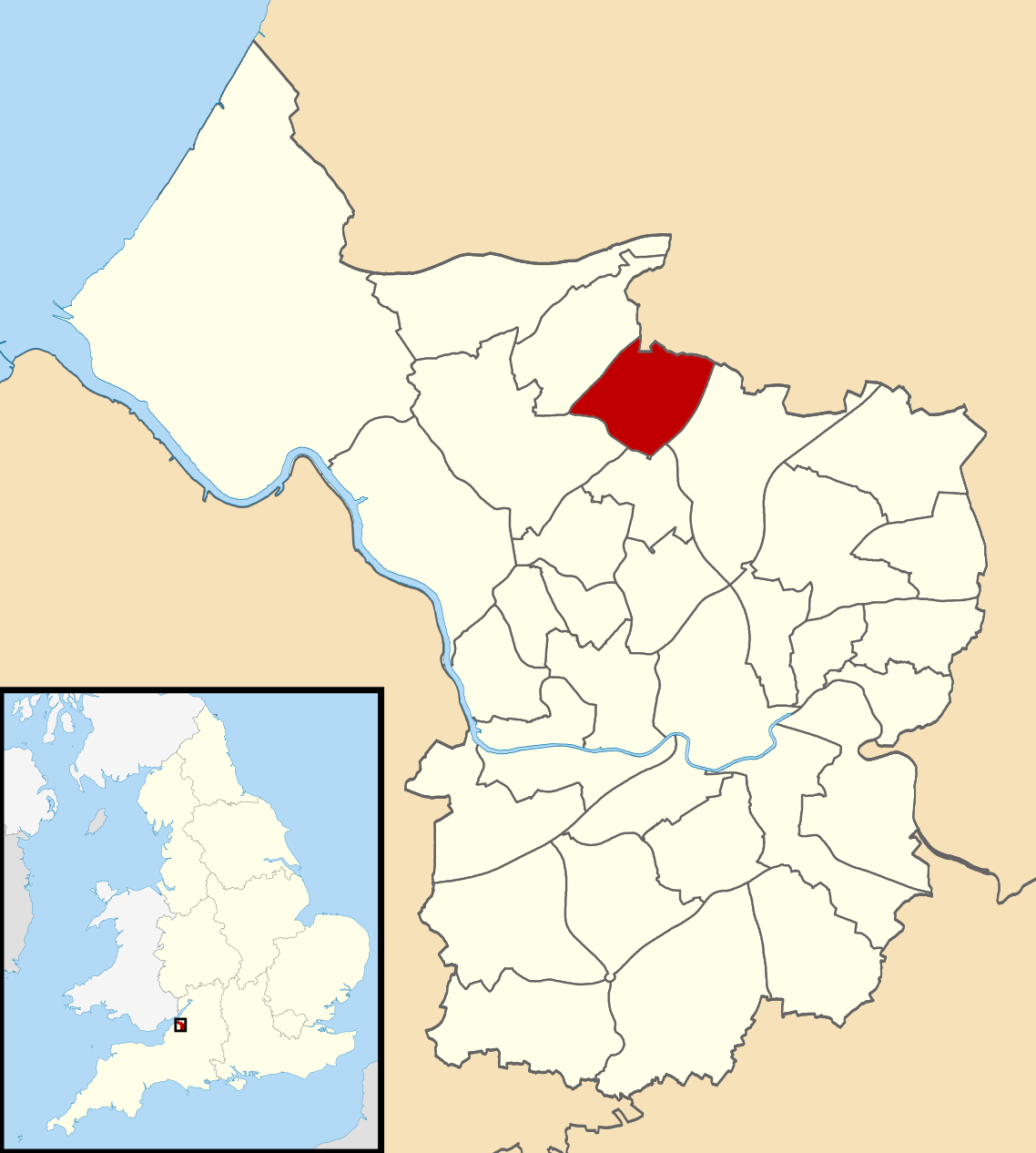
- Boundaries of the city council ward since 2016
- Population: 12,826 (2011, ward)
- OS grid reference: ST597769
- Unitary authority: Bristol
- Ceremonial county: Bristol
- Region: South West
- Country: England
- Sovereign state: United Kingdom
- Post town: Bristol
- Postcode district: BS7
- Dialling code: 0117
- Police: Avon and Somerset
- Fire: Avon
- Ambulance: South Western
- UK Parliament: Bristol North West

Horfield is a suburb of the city of Bristol, in southwest England. It lies on Bristol's northern edge, its border with Filton marking part of the boundary between Bristol and South Gloucestershire. Bishopston lies directly to the south. Monks Park and Golden Hill are to the west. Lockleaze and Ashley Down are on the eastern fringe. The Gloucester Road (A38) runs north–south through the suburb.

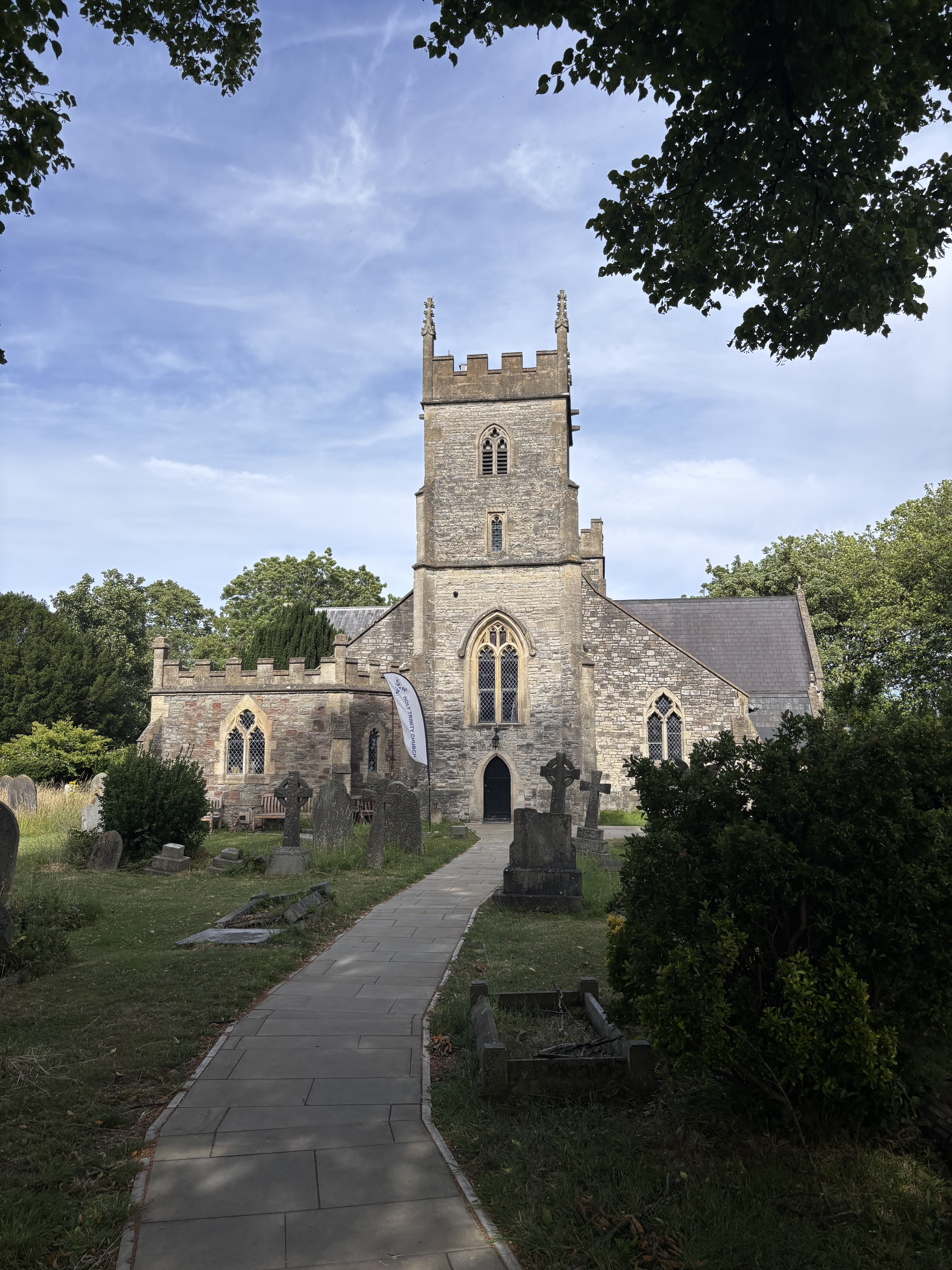
Church of Holy Trinity with St Edmund

Horfield is also the name of an electoral ward for Bristol City Council. The ward includes Monks Park and Southmead Hospital, but does not include the southern part of Horfield, including Horfield Common and Horfield Prison, which is in Bishopston and Ashley Down ward.

== History ==
The name is Anglo-Saxon in origin, and means "filthy open land" (Old English horu and feld).

Horfield was a parish in the hundred of Berkeley in Gloucestershire, which included Bishopston, Golden Hill, Lockleaze and part of Ashley Down.

Historically, the area had a reputation as a lawless place because Horfield Wood was the haunt of thieves and vagrants. The area remained rural until the early 19th century.

Following the 1831 Bristol Riots, during which the local gaol burnt down, Horfield Prison was completed in 1847. A permanent military presence was established in the city with the completion of Horfield Barracks also in 1847.

Horfield was mostly developed from the mid 19th century onwards. In 1859, Bishopston became a separate parish. The remainder of Horfield became a civil parish in 1866, when civil parishes were introduced. In 1894 Horfield Urban District was formed, but in 1904 it was absorbed into Bristol. In 1901 the parish had a population of 1435. On 1 April 1904 the parish was abolished and merged with Bristol.

== Amenities ==
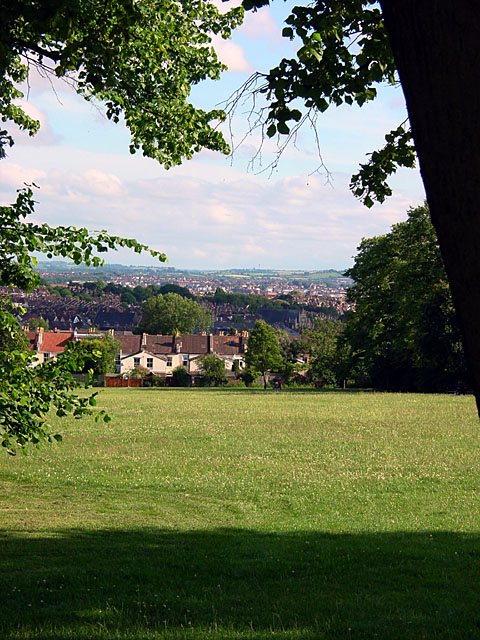
Horfield Common

Horfield is home to the Memorial Stadium: a sports stadium built in 1921 for Bristol Rugby Club in memory of the rugby union players of the city who died in World War I, and rededicated to also commemorate the dead of World War II. In 1996, the ground also became home to Bristol Rovers Football Club who now own it. Bristol Rugby Club has since moved out of the ground and is now based at the Bristol City FC stadium in the south of the city.

Near the Memorial Stadium is The Wellington, CAMRA Bristol & District joint winner of Pub of the Year for 2005. The 2006 Pub of the Year is also in Horfield, The Inn on the Green on Gloucester Road.

Horfield has a leisure centre that was updated to have a 25-metre swimming pool in 2005. Horfield Leisure Centre has a gym, swimming pool and learners pool, and a sports hall. Outside the complex is a small skateboard park. The leisure centre was built in the 1980s on open ground opposite the old Horfield Barracks, where open and closed-in rifle ranges once stood.

Of Horfield's green spaces, Horfield Common is the largest, having a central enclosure of tennis courts and a bowling club. Horfield Common is one of Bristol's highest points of land above sea level.

There is a library on Filton Avenue.

There is a primary school, Filton Avenue Primary School, also on Filton Avenue.

There are two GP surgeries that serve Horfield, Horfield Health Centre and Monks Park Surgery.

The nearest hospital is Southmead Hospital, a large public National Health Service hospital, situated a short distance away in the Southmead neighbourhood. It is part of the North Bristol NHS Trust. (Note: Although the hospital is located in the area of Southmead, it is a part of the Horfield Ward.)

The nearest Police Station used to be situated just west of Horfield on Southmead Road, however this was closed and replaced by a care home. The nearest Police Station is now a community police station based in the grounds of Southmead Hospital.

== Transport ==
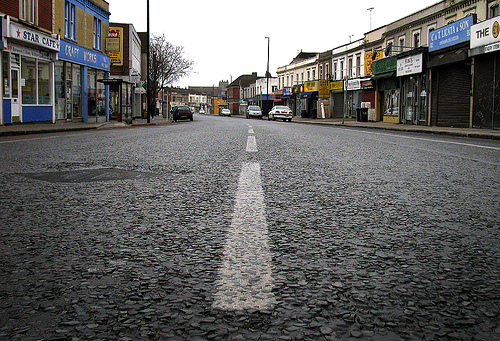
The A38 Gloucester Road at Horfield, Bristol

First Bristol, Bath & the West runs services to Burnett, Southmead, Broadmead, Hengrove and Bristol city centre.

Stagecoach South Wales run services to Temple Meads, Broadmead, Southmead and Long Ashton.

The main road running through Horfield is the Gloucester Road section of the A38 and is the longest road of independent shops in the UK.

Historically, from the latter part of the 19th century until the first third of the 20th century, Horfield was served by Bristol's tram system, with Horfield having its own tram depot near the junction of Gloucester Road and Church Road. The tram depot site is now a petrol station and a doctor's surgery at the rear. Tram lines which once lead into the depot have been preserved in the surface of the car park of the surgery.

Between 1927 and 1964, the northeast part of the district was served by Horfield railway station.

== Notable residents ==
Famous residents of Horfield include actor Cary Grant, who was born at 15 Hughenden Road in 1904, and composer Ray Steadman-Allen was born at 64 Muller Road in 1922. The cartoonist Annie Fish was born at Brynland Avenue in 1890. New Zealand actor Ken Blackburn was also born here in 1935.

== Politics ==
For elections to Bristol City Council, Horfield is split between the electoral wards of Horfield to the north and Bishopston and Ashley Down to the south. For elections to the House of Commons, both wards have been in Bristol North West constituency since 2024; Bishopston and Ashley Down was previously in Bristol West.

== Churches ==
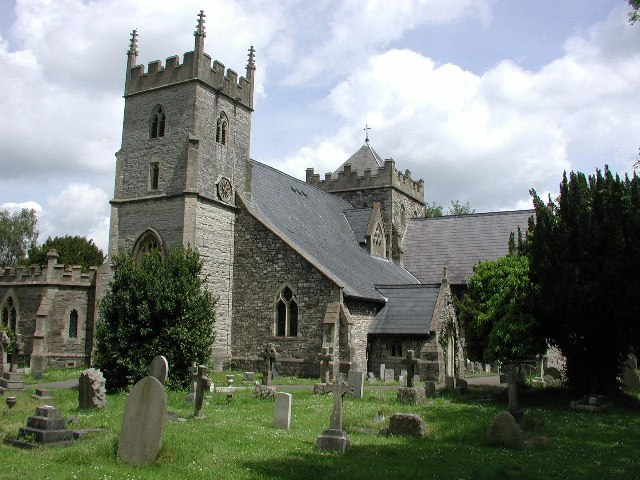
Holy Trinity Church, Horfield

The Anglican parish church is the Church of the Holy Trinity with St Edmund. It was possibly founded as early as 603, but the earliest remnant is an old pillar and the circular churchyard. The tower is late 15th century or early 16th century with the nave and aisles added to by William Butterfield in 1847. The central tower was erected in 1893 by local firm Crisp & Oately and the transepts later in 1913 and 1929. It is a grade II* listed building.

St. Edmund's Church was erected in the lancet style in 1860 by ST Welch as a school. It was given a tower and side aisles in 1930 by Hartland Thomas. A building with a roof (similar to the parish church), Anglo catholic interior, and a high church tradition, the church closed in 1979 and was a printers until it was demolished in 2006.

Horfield Barracks chapel is a lancet styled chapel erected in 1859 with some good handling of dressings and very good bellcote. Closed in the 1920s, the chapel lay dormant for decades until being converted to offices in the 1980s. It is grade II listed.

There is a Methodist chapel, built in 1899 by La Trobe in Victorian Arts and Crafts Gothic with a fine wooden interior. A former Salvation Army chapel stands in Ashley Down Road. Horfield Baptist Chapel is a twin towered perpendicular chapel by Milverton Drake with an organ by Hele. The Roman Catholic Chapel of St Maximillian Kolbe with St Edith Stein and the Holocaust Martyrs is in Alfoxton Road. There is a Quaker meeting house of 1906 in domestic red brick. Whitefield Tabernacle on Muller Road contains the 18th century pulpit removed from Penn Street Tabernacle when that was demolished to make way for the city centre. It also contains the superb 1815 wooden organ case.
