= Gloucester Road, Bristol =

Street in Bristol, United Kingdom

Coordinates: 51°28′30″N 2°35′32″W

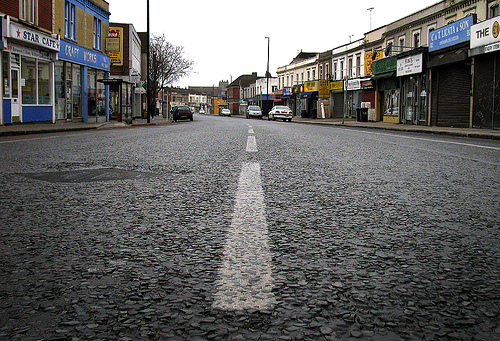
- Gloucester Road running through Horfield, Bristol.

- Location within Bristol
- Maintained by: Bristol City Council
- Location: Bristol, England
- Postal code: BS7
- North: Filton Road
- South: Cheltenham Road

Gloucester Road is a road in Bristol, England. It runs through the suburbs of St. Andrew's, Bishopston and Horfield and is a part of the A38, a former coaching route north of Bristol to Filton and the M5 Motorway.

The street is a focal point for local businesses, and is promoted by Bristol City Council as a centre of independent trade. The Bristol North Baths on Gloucester Road were popular for most of the 20th century, and the location was used in filming for several television shows. Numerous shops and bars have achieved popularity in the local press for their unique contribution to Bristol. Graffiti and stencil art is popular and encouraged by some business in the area.

== Geography ==
The road is around 1.7 miles (2.7 km) long. It starts at the junction with Cheltenham Road, Zetland Road and Elton Road. Cheltenham Road is spanned by a railway viaduct (known locally as "the Arches") carrying the Severn Beach Line south of this junction. The first property on Gloucester Road (1–3, currently occupied by Waitrose) is at the site where the, now culverted, Cutler's Mills Brook joins the Horfield Brook. The difference between the two roads is further emphasised by the fact that Gloucester Road has the postal code of BS7 whilst Cheltenham Road is BS6. The road heads northeast through the suburbs of St. Andrew's, Bishopston and Horfield, ending at the edge of the 19th century Bristol County Borough by the site of Horfield Barracks. The road ahead through the suburbs is Filton Road, then Gloucester Road North towards the site of Filton Airport and the M5.

The road is part of the A38, a cross-country route across England, though in this part of Bristol it is not a major through route. It is part of the Cotham, Redland and Gloucester Road Conservation Area, designated by Bristol City Council to conserve the local architecture and open space. Cycling and motorist groups have clashed about facilities on Gloucester Road; the former want a better provision of cycling lanes, while the latter would like better parking facilities. The situation has increased in the 2010s following Bristol becoming the first Cycling City in 2008 and encouraging more cycling.

== History ==
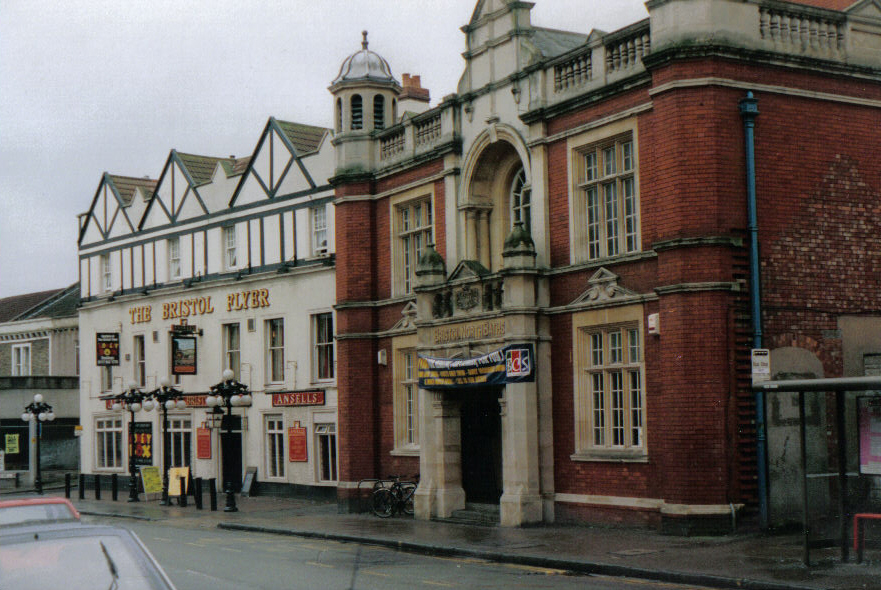
Both the Bristol Flyer and Bristol North Baths on Gloucester Road were used for location filming in Only Fools and Horses.

The road has been part of the coaching route from Bristol to Gloucester since the Middle Ages, as the name suggests, though the historic route south of it took a different route to the city centre via Cotham Road and Horfield Road, while traffic today goes via Cheltenham Road and Stokes Croft. It had become built-up along its length around 1888.

Shops and traders settled on the road in the late 19th century. At the turn of the 20th, there were a high concentration of butchers and grocers, as was typical for the time, but these were gradually replaced by pubs, cafes and charity shops. The street was home to Rooted Records, the central location of the Bristol dubstep scene until closure in 2010.

The Bristol North Baths were based on Gloucester Road, and the building is Grade II listed. Opening in 1915, they once included an annex for "slipper baths" that catered for individual bathing, as opposed to swimming in a group. The annex was demolished and became a car park in 2002, while the main baths closed in 2005. The building is awaiting redevelopment into flats. Along with the Bristol Flyer at No. 96 next door, the baths were used for location shots in the television sitcoms Only Fools and Horses and The Young Ones. Although Bristol City Council has invested £3m in redeveloping the North Baths, progress has continually stalled, as hidden structural problems have been uncovered. In 2016, the council reported an extra £1.5 million would be required to complete the project.

In 2024, Gloucester Road was ranked third best in the UK for independent shops in an analysis by American Express.

== Shopping ==
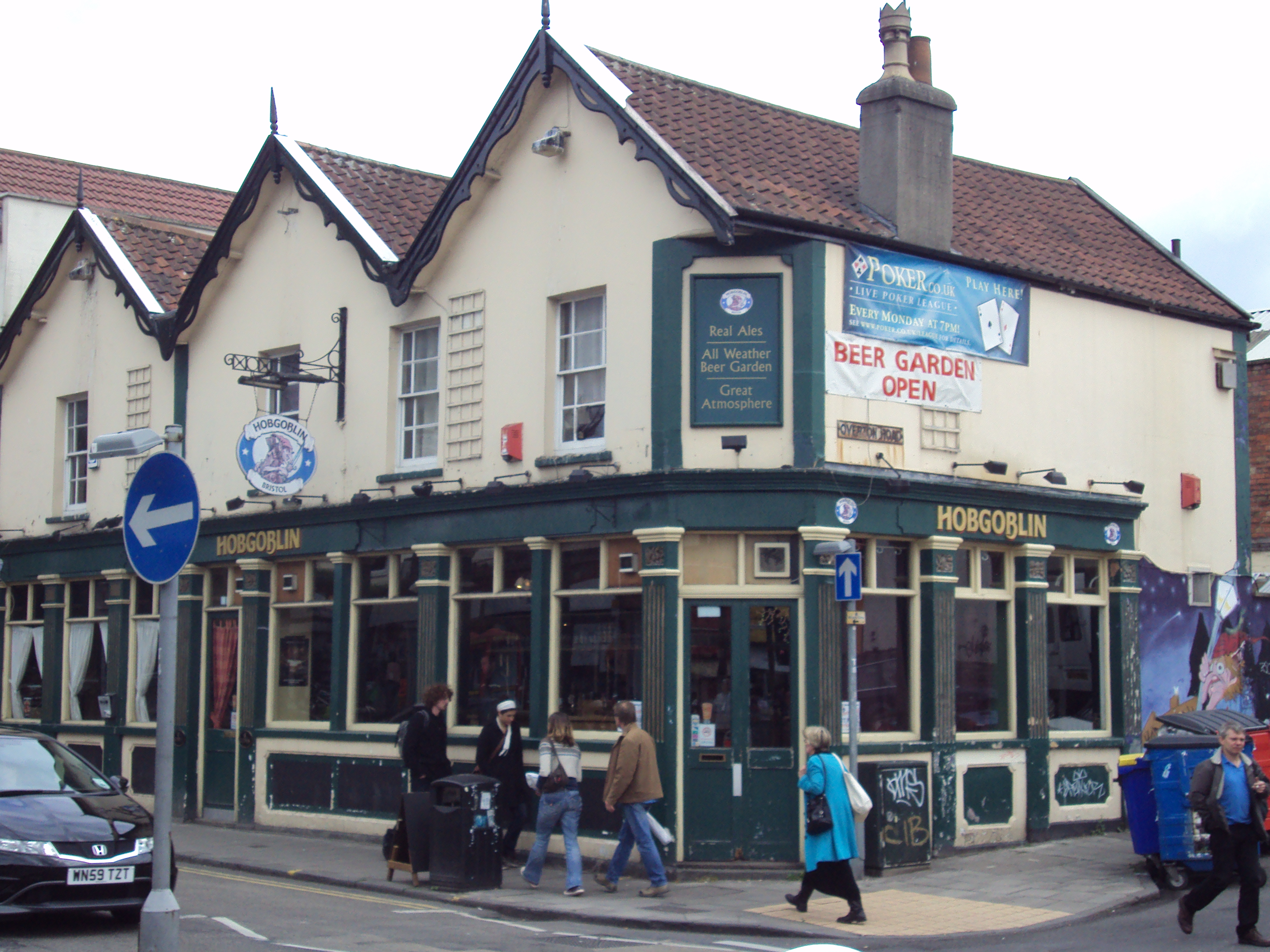
The Hobgoblin pub, Gloucester Road

Gloucester Road is well known for independent shops. In 2004, its only chain store was a branch of Somerfield. It has survived due to the concentration of middle class housing on either side of the road, whose occupiers prefer local goods. A Bristol Post report suggested "you can buy anything you could ever need" on Gloucester Road, and that it captured the independent spirit of the local community well. A Barratt Homes report has described Gloucester Road as having the longest row of independent shops in Europe.

The Grape & Grind, an off licence at No. 101, was established in 2010, and includes an enomatic wine dispenser. Reclaimers Reclamation at No. 307, specialises in furniture recycled from other products, such as kitchen worktop made from the slate off a snooker table. Along with the craft shop Fig at No. 206, these shops were featured as part of the ten best independent shops in Bristol in a report by The Guardian.

Crawford's Newsagents, at No. 200, has been trading since the Victorian era.

The Drapers Arms, No. 447, is a micropub with locally brewed beer and a lack of fruit machines and juke boxes. The name reflects the history of the site as a draper's shop.

== Culture ==
Because Gloucester Road is popular with artists, creative works are encouraged by local businesses. The Golden Lion pub permits graffiti artists to draw on their walls, provided their artwork includes a lion. In 2014, a graffiti stencil of Cary Grant, who grew up in the local area, was drawn above Room 212 on Gloucester Road. Though Banksy's artwork features in many locations around Bristol, there is none on Gloucester Road; the nearest being "The Mild Mild West" further south on the A38 at Stokes Croft.

An annual street party is held every Christmas on Gloucester Road. During the event, shops are encouraged to open late, and additional food and drink stalls are available. In 2014, Bristol City Council spent over £23,000 on new Christmas lights on order to promote the party and related events.

== Public transport ==
Many bus routes operate on Gloucester Road; the 3A, 3B and 3X operated by Stagecoach West, and the 72, 73, 74, 75, 76, 77, T2 and Severn Express operated by First West of England. The nearest railway station is Montpelier railway station on the Severn Beach Line.

=== Future plans ===
Studies produced by the West of England Combined Authority have deduced that journeys by bus along Gloucester Road are slow and unreliable as a result of slow-moving traffic along the route, which limits the potential to achieve modal shift from the car as public transport is not an attractive option for many journeys. Highway constraints on the road limit the ability to increase public transport capacity with additional bus services. Therefore, a fully segregated rapid transit route, potentially underground, is desired to address transport needs on the corridor.
