= Parks of Bristol =

Parks and open spaces in Bristol, England

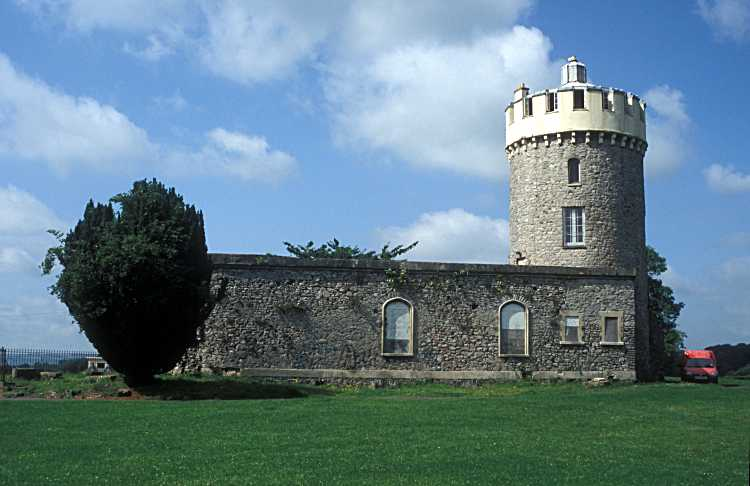
The Camera obscura on Clifton Down

The English city of Bristol has a number of parks and public open spaces.

== Large parks ==
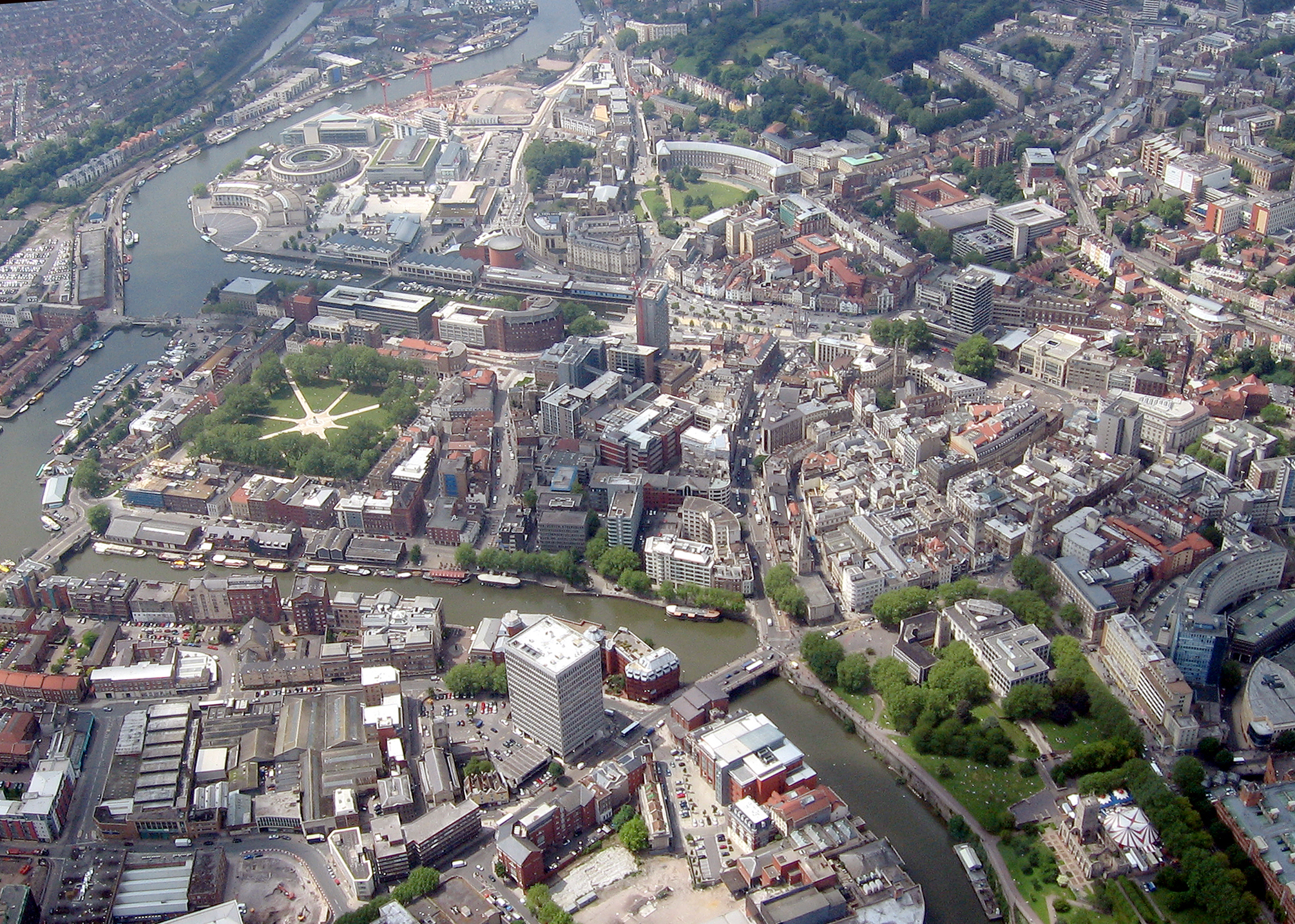
Aerial view of Bristol showing the principal parks in the centre: Brandon Hill (top right), College Green (above centre), Queen Square (left), and Castle Park (bottom right)

Bristol City Council own or manage four major parks: The Downs, Blaise Castle, Ashton Court and Stoke Park.

The Downs lie 2 miles (3 km) northwest of the city centre and totals 441 acres (1.78 km^{2}). The Downs are divided into Clifton Down to the south and Durdham Down to the north, with a main road running between them. At the south end of Clifton Down is the Clifton Suspension Bridge, and both look over the Avon Gorge. The Downs are protected by an 1861 Act of Parliament, and are managed by the Downs Committee, a joint committee of the city council (which owns Durdham Down) and the Society of Merchant Venturers (which owns Clifton Down).

Blaise Castle estate, situated 4 miles (6 km) north west of the city centre, includes a recreation ground and large playing fields, as well as woodland, a mansion, and a small gorge, totalling 650 acres (2.6 km^{2}). The mansion house is now a branch of Bristol City Museum and Art Gallery.

At 850 acres (3.4 km^{2}) Ashton Court estate is Bristol's largest park. Though the estate lies largely within the boundaries of North Somerset it is maintained by Bristol City Council, and has been publicly owned since 1959. The park contains horse riding and mountain biking trails, and is protected as a Site of Special Scientific Interest for its ecology. The mansion house is now a conference centre.

Stoke Park is Bristol's newest park, acquired by Bristol City Council in 2011 and occupying a prominent position alongside the M32 motorway.

== Parks and open spaces in the central area ==
The Centre Promenade is a paved, largely pedestrianised area built over the culverted River Frome. Known locally as the Centre, many local bus services terminate here.

Castle Park is adjacent to the Broadmead and Cabot Circus shopping centres and the Floating Harbour. The park was created after wartime bombing damaged much of the pre-war shopping area which stood here. The ruined shells of two churches, St Peter and St Mary le Port, still stand in the park (with the aid of concrete reinforcements) and the foundations of Bristol Castle are also a feature. There are small formal gardens around St Peter's church, which is maintained as a war memorial. Bristol City Council has confirmed its intention to redevelop the area around St Mary-le-Port church. The project area includes a part of Castle Park to the west of St Peter's Church.

To the west of the city centre lie Berkeley Square and Brandon Hill. At the summit of Brandon Hill, the Cabot Tower commemorates John Cabot, a pioneer who sailed in 1497 from Bristol to Newfoundland. Brandon Hill is steep and is divided into informal gardens, a small nature reserve and open grassland. The Avon Wildlife Trust headquarters are beside the park.

Surrounded with high wrought-iron railings to the northwest of Broadmead shopping centre, St James' Park is a small former churchyard divided by a sunken walkway which links Broadmead to St James' Church and Bristol bus station.

West of the city centre between Bristol Cathedral and the Council House is College Green, a popular meeting place for street sports enthusiasts.

Queen Square is a large Georgian square south of the city centre. In 1936 the Square was bisected diagonally by Bristol's inner circuit road. Traffic has now been diverted, and the restored Square has received a number of awards including a Green Flag Award, the Landscape Institution Landscape and Heritage Award.

King Square (restored in 1993), Brunswick Square and Portland Square are also Georgian and lie to the north of the city centre.

Work commenced in 2014 to remodel The Bearpit, a sunken space within St James Barton roundabout long seen to be in need of improvement. These works include construction of street-level pedestrian crossings and new wider stairways leading down to the open space.

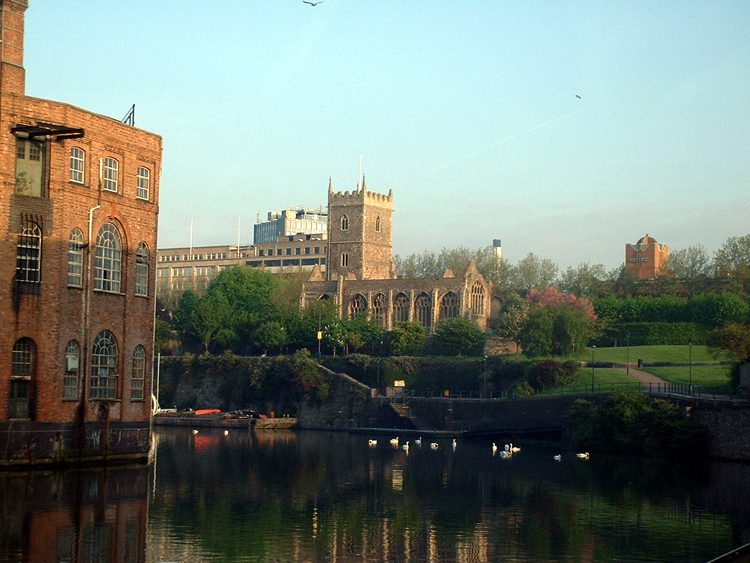
St Peter's Church in Castle Park, with the shopping centre behind

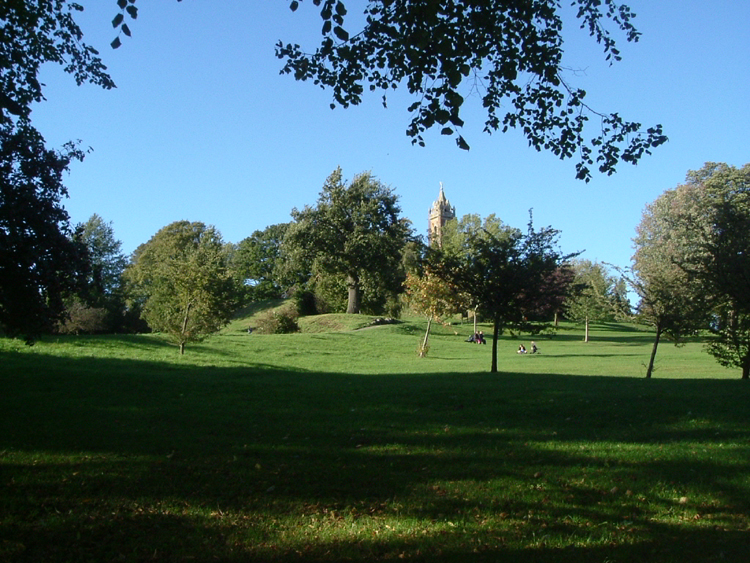
Brandon Hill and Cabot Tower

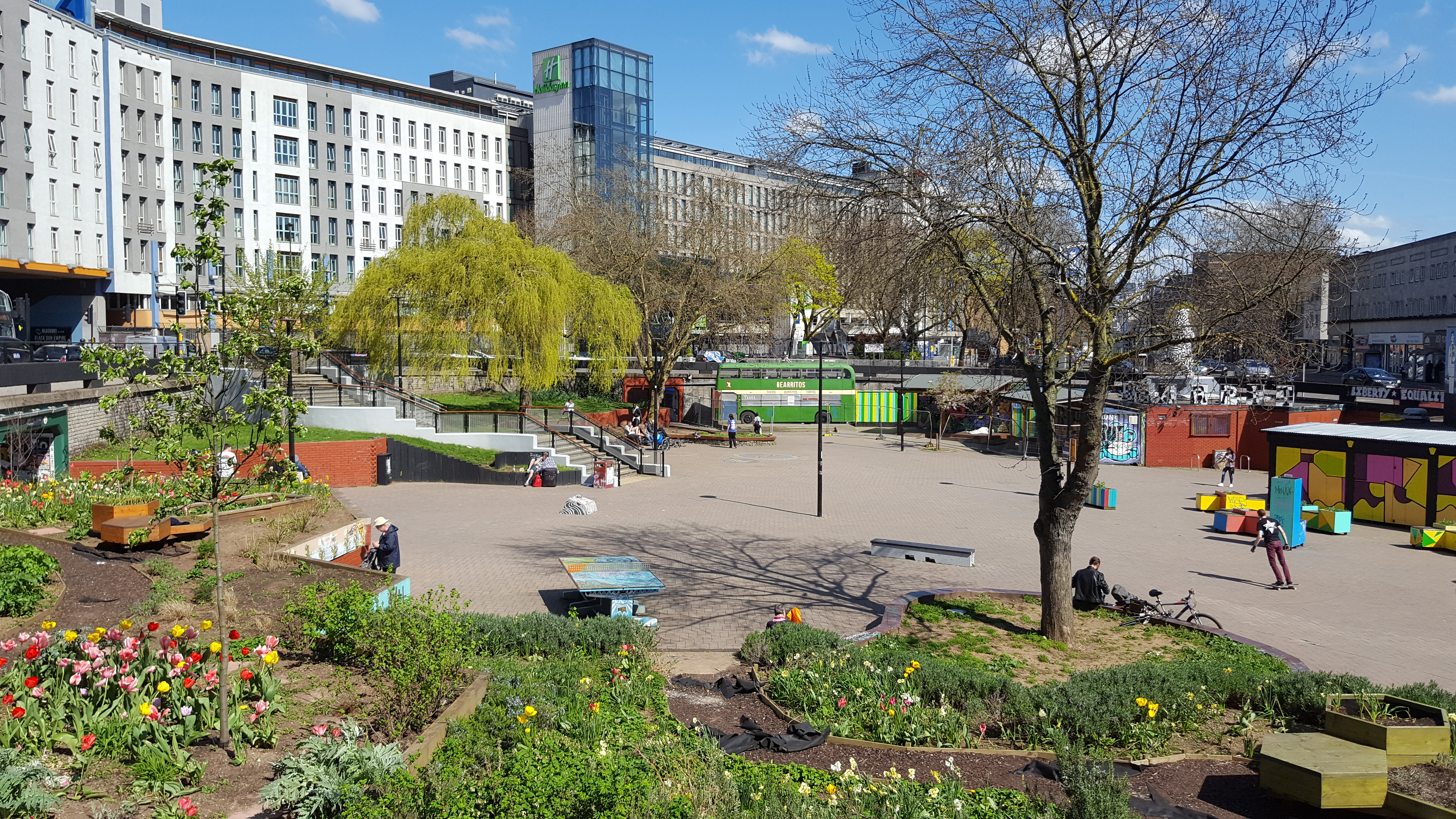
The Bearpit (St James Barton) Bristol

== Other parks ==
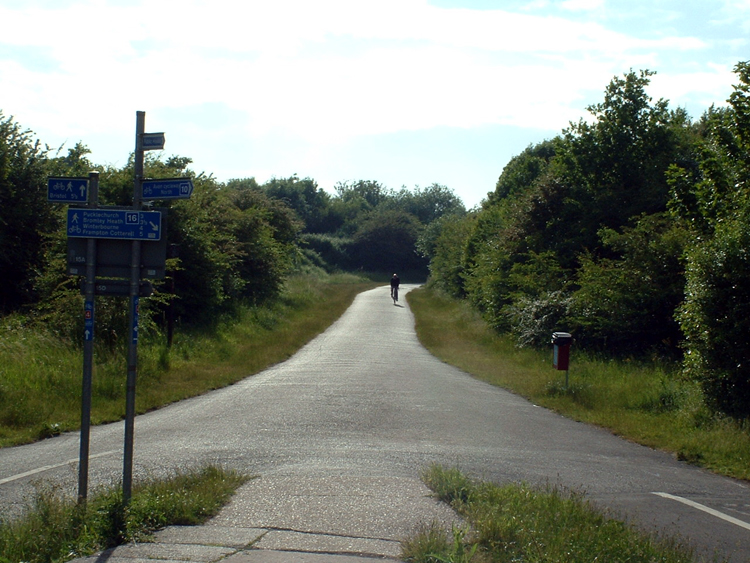
Bristol & Bath Railway Path

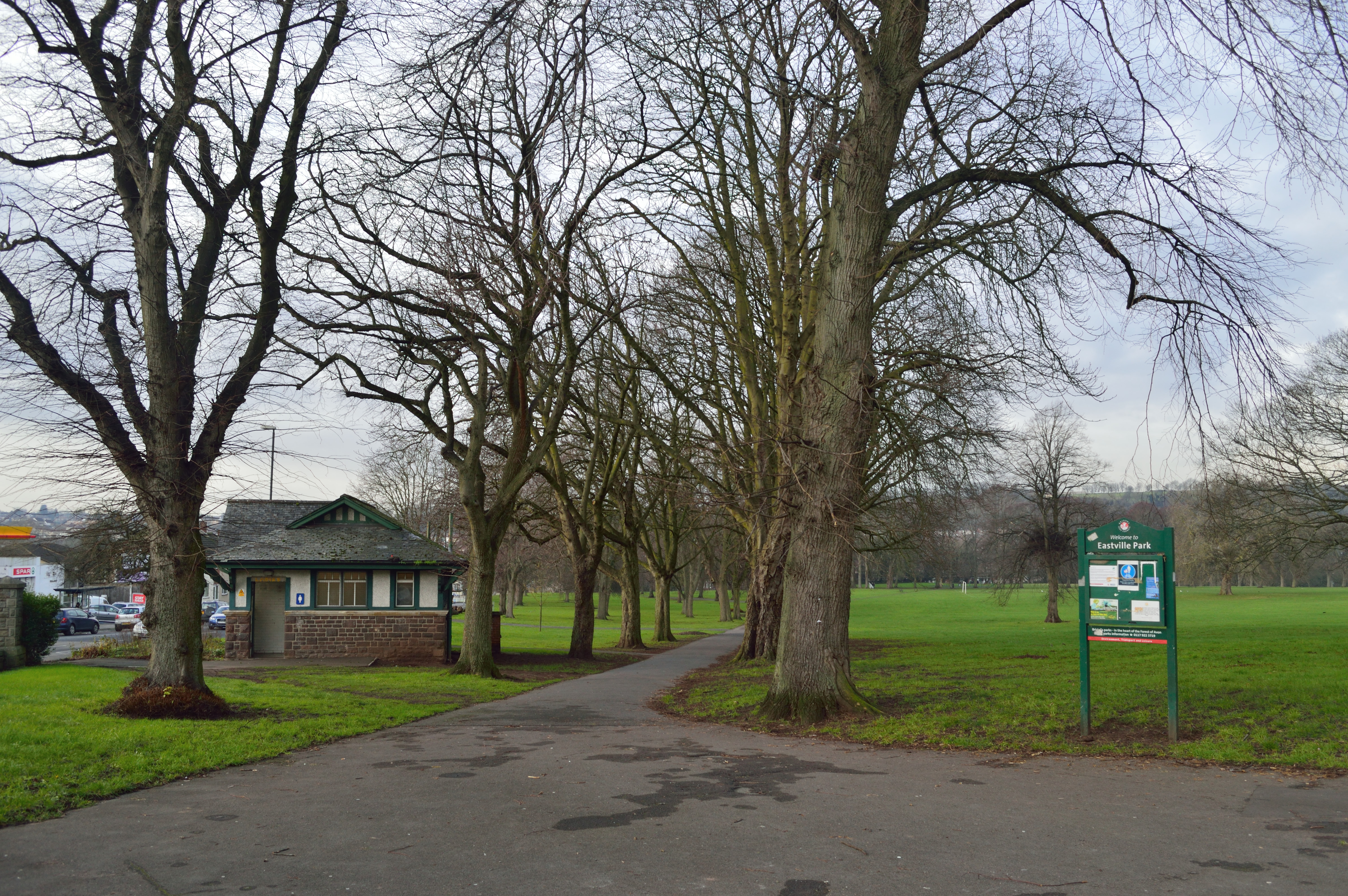
Eastville Park

Parks in Bristol's suburbs include:

- Arnos Vale Cemetery
- Begbrook Green Park
- Bristol & Bath Railway Path, a green corridor following the route of a dismantled railway.
- Brunswick Cemetery Gardens - disused cemetery, enhanced as a public open space in 2010
- Canford Park
- Cotham Gardens
- Crox Bottom, which has Pidgeonhouse Stream (a tributary of the River Malago) running through it
- Dame Emily Park
- Eastville Park
- Gaunts Ham Park
- Gores Marsh Park
- Greville Smyth Park
- Hengrove Park
- Horfield Common
- Lamplighters Marsh
- Leigh Woods, within North Somerset). Owned by the National Trust.
- Manor Woods Valley Local Nature Reserve, which has the River Malago running through it
- Marksbury Road Open Space, which also has the River Malago running through it
- Mina Road Park
- Monks Park
- Montpelier Park
- Northern Slopes, a group of open spaces that includes the Bommie, Glyn Vale open space, Kingswear open space and Novers Common
- Oldbury Court Estate (known locally as Vassalls Park)
- Page Park
- Perrett’s Park
- Redcatch Park
- Redland Green
- Ridgeway Playing Fields, Hillfields
- Riverside Park
- Royal Fort Gardens
- Snuff Mills, owned by the National Trust
- Sparke Evans Park
- St Agnes Park
- St Andrews Park
- St Anne's Park
- St George Park
- Stoke Park
- Victoria Park
