= Bristol Free School =

Location
- Concorde Drive; Bristol, BS10 6NJ; England; 51.5008°N 2.6134°W

Information
- Type: Free school
- Established: 2011
- Founder: Russell Education Trust & Parents Voice
- Trust: Bristol Free School Trust
- Department for Education URN: 136822 Tables
- Ofsted: Reports
- Head teacher: Susan King
- Gender: Mixed
- Age: 11 to 18
- Enrolment: 1138 (as of Jan 2021 census)
- Capacity: 1090 (as of Jan 2021 census)
- Houses: Blaise, Ashton, Canford, Durdham
- Colours: Blue, Red, Navy
- Website: http://www.bristolfreeschool.org.uk

Bristol Free School (BFS) is a Secondary Academy which opened in Southmead, Bristol, England, in September 2011.

BFS has capacity for 790 pupils across Key Stage 3 and Key Stage 4, and capacity for 300 in its Sixth Form, which opened in September 2016.

The school is located in the Westbury on Trym and Southmead ward areas, at former Department for Environment, Food and Rural Affairs (DEFRA) and Environment Agency offices, which were converted or rebuilt for use by the school. Bristol Free School is secular and non-selective.

== History ==
Bristol Free School was proposed following a 20-year history of parental campaigning in response to a perceived lack of suitable secondary school places in North Bristol. The campaign group, Parents Voice, wanted to open a secondary school either at an Adult Education Centre at Stoke Lodge, or on the former St Ursula's School site, to serve the Westbury-on-Trym, Stoke Bishop, Sneyd Park and Henleaze districts of north west Bristol which had no nearby state secondary school. However residents near Stoke Lodge wanted no development, and Bristol City Council wanted to use St Ursula's E-ACT Academy for a primary school, which is currently being rebuilt. (Data from September 2016).

Initial approval for the school's plan and business case was given by the Department for Education in November 2010. Final approval was given in May 2011.

In January 2011, 417 members of the community signed a petition to ask Bristol City Council to allow a secondary school on the St Ursula's site. Following this and other representations, Bristol City Council Cabinet gave an "agreement in principle" to allowing Bristol Free School to move to St Ursula's in 2012, in a split-site arrangement with a new Primary Academy.

In July 2011, the school was granted planning permission to use a former Environment Agency and DEFRA site on Burghill Road, in the neighbouring area of Brentry within the Southmead electoral ward. This was expected to be a temporary site as the school anticipated moving to the St Ursula's site in September 2012. The Burghill Road site was earmarked to rehouse on a single site over 1,000 civil servants based in nearly 60 buildings in Bristol, prospectively saving more than £6 million per year.

In July 2012 it was confirmed that Bristol Free School would remain at the further developed Brentry site. DEFRA held a 39-year lease on the site, which is owned by Bristol City Council. An £8 million contract was let by the Department for Education to refurbish existing buildings and build new buildings to support the expansion of the school from 2013. Total capital spending by the department to set up the school was £9.6 million, the largest amount amongst the first batch of fifteen free schools, plus £0.75 million of extra initial revenue funding. On 25 June, Bristol Free School opened its new building to students.

At the end of its first year the school was featured in an ITV News report about Free Schools.

=== General information ===
The school's buildings include a large Learning Resource Centre or Library, 2 floors with wheelchair accessibility, a MUGA (Multi Use Game Area), a grass field with Cricket Nets, a cafeteria, and a sports hall. The school day lasts from 8:30am to 3:00pm.

The areas served by the school include Henleaze, Westbury-on-Trym, parts of Horfield, Southmead and Henbury.

=== Pupil recruitment ===
BFS was proposed to open with 150 Year 7 pupils, expanding by 150 pupils in subsequent years, to accommodate up to 750 pupils across 5 year-groups (Year 7 to Year 13) by 2016 once it was fully open. However, when the school opened in September 2011 it only had 80 Year 7 pupils, and the reduction in projected numbers was blamed on the uncertainty over site arrangements. Pupil recruitment into Year 7 increased in subsequent years, and the school was reported to be oversubscribed from September 2013 onwards. In September 2016 it accommodated an additional 40 students in Year 7, bringing the number in that year group to 190. From September 2017 it formally increased its Year 7 Published Admission Number to 200.

=== Criticism ===
BFS was one of the first Free Schools to be opened in England, when the new concept was attracting widespread criticism from politicians and educationalists. The Headmistress of nearby Henbury School, and Chair of the Bristol's Secondary Head Teachers' Association, Clare Bradford, said that if funding for BFS was approved by the DfE then she would seek a judicial review. She put this in a letter to Michael Gove, the Secretary of State for Education, but was reported to have received an unequivocal response. She said that BFS was being established only for middle-class parents, that it would damage existing schools, and that it wasn't needed because there were already surplus places. However the Bristol Free School Trust said that it would reserve places for families in less affluent areas. School census figures reported in 2015 indicated that the number of children at BFS on Free School Meals was higher than the national average.

Bristol City Council Leader, Barbara Janke, and another Lib Dem cabinet member, expressed disappointment that BFS would not be offering places to Oasis School Westbury Senior Phase pupils after they originally said that they would.

The President of the National Union of Teachers, Nina Franklin, who was a critic of Free School policy in general, was quoted in media reports as criticizing the decision to fund BFS specifically, saying that other local schools would suffer as a result.

When it was confirmed that BFS would be remaining at the Brentry site permanently, the school adjusted its admissions criteria, which was originally designed to cater for families living close to the St. Ursula's site. It extended its main catchment area to include the school site in Burghill Road. A local media report raised concerns that children living in Henbury and Southmead might not be able to access the school.

In 2012, the Royal Society of Arts published a study which showed that the school, in common with many Free Schools, had been set up in an area with no shortage of school places, with 300 surplus secondary places within a few miles. The Department for Education later released the impact assessment for the school, showing the context in which that decision was made. Figures from Bristol City Council published in 2013 indicated that, notwithstanding the establishment of BFS, further Secondary provision would be required in the medium to long term.
