= St Ursula's School =

School in Henleze, Bristol, England

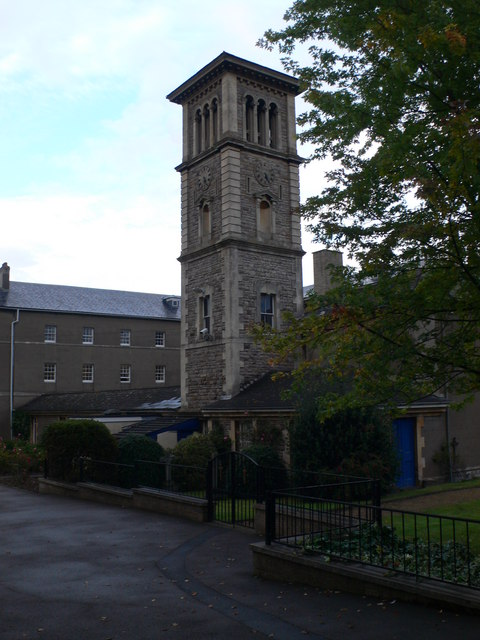

Location
- Brecon Road; Bristol, BS9 4DT; England; 51°29′11″N 2°36′51″W

Information
- Type: Independent
- Motto: Misericordia Dominus Illuminatio Mea
- Established: 1896
- Founder: Sisters of Mercy
- Closed: 2010
- Head: Lynette Carter
- Gender: Coeducational
- Age: 5 to 11
- Enrolment: 120
- Houses: eagles hawks falcons owls
- Colours: Red, gold

Oasis School Westbury

Location
- Brecon Road; Bristol, BS9 4DT; England

Information
- Type: Independent (ex-Catholic)
- Motto: Dominus Illuminatio Mea (The Lord is my Light)
- Established: 2010 (1896 previous school)
- Founder: Oasis
- Closed: 2011 (replaced by St. Ursula's E-ACT Primary Academy)
- Head Mistress: Lynette Carter (second lay headmistress)
- Gender: Coeducational
- Age: 4 to 16
- Enrolment: 130
- Houses: Avon; Sevon; Frome
- Colours: Yellow and red

St Ursula's School was a private school in Henleaze, Bristol, England. It consisted of a Junior Department, providing education for pupils up to age 11.

In 2010, St Ursula's went into administration after it became financially unviable due to falling pupil numbers. It was temporarily saved by the Bristol City Council, which bought the school site, and Community Learning, a subsidiary of the Oasis Trust. This led to the opening of School Westbury' as an interim measure during the 2010/2011 academic year. Oasis Community Learning operated the school with a one-year lease and closed it in July 2011.

At the start of the 2011/2012 academic year, Bristol Council allocated the site to St Ursula's E-ACT Academy, the first primary academy in Bristol.

In January 2015, St Ursula's was given a good rating by Ofsted which remains sponsored by E-ACT

== History ==
The school was named after St. Ursula, the patron saint of young girls and students. It was opened in 1896 by the Sisters of Mercy, St. Ursula's was originally a girls' boarding school. The school stopped accepting boarders in 1927. During the Second World War, the cellars served as air raid shelters to the population of Henleaze and in 1942 the school was bombed and evacuated. Much of the school was destroyed by the bombing, but was re-built in 1948.

In 1972 the school underwent major changes when the convent was converted into classrooms and subject rooms. Also in 1972, the Board of Governors took responsibility for the strategic management and policies operated by the school, including its financial affairs and facilities. In 1986, the Gym/Sports Hall for Games Lessons and the community was opened, after contributions from parents. The school retained close links with the Sacred Heart Catholic Church positioned at the rear of the school but lessons were not taught by the nuns after 1988, when the Sisters of Mercy withdrew from independent education in the UK and the school was taken over by an educational trust.

The first lay headmistress was Margaret McNaughton who served until 2005. Under her leadership the school began to accept boys, first in the Junior School and then in the Senior Department in 1996. At this time the Sixth Form was closed due to inadequate numbers. In 2005, Lynette Carter, who previously had served as Senior Mistress of the Junior Department, took over as Headmistress. She continued as headteacher when the school became Oasis Westbury.

=== Closure ===
Facing falling pupil numbers, in early 2010 St. Ursula's expressed interest in moving to the state sector as an Academy. This did not come to fruition, and as the Trustees were unable to find a purchaser who could take the school on as a going concern, Grant Thornton were appointed as administrators. In August 2010 they announced that the school would close.

Oasis Community Learning took it over with a one-year lease from the council and said that they wanted to run an all-through academy on the site or at least a primary academy. However the bids failed and education provider E-ACT were chosen to run a primary only academy on the site. Oasis School Westbury closed on 15 July 2011.

=== Efforts to save the school from closure ===
On the creation of Oasis School Westbury, parents of St. Ursula's pupils formed the Parents' Action Group (PAG). This group tried to save the school, first by supporting Oasis and then by putting in their own free school application bid. When rejection of the PAG/Oasis bids was announced, some parents formed a new group, Bristol Children First. This group aimed to save their school by negotiating with the Bristol Free School (BFS) Trust, which comprised a local parents' group called Parents' Voice and the Russell Education Trust.

The BFS Trust wanted to run their own secondary free school on the St. Ursula's site. They were originally in competition with both Oasis and PAG, but were progressing faster towards Department for Education approval. They applied to the DfE to alter the business case for their proposal to extend it from Secondary to all-through provision, but were not successful in doing so. BFS was eventually approved to open as a Secondary school, and was allocated an alternative temporary site in Brentry. The BFS Trust hoped to move the school to the St. Ursula's site in 2012, but its bid to do that was unsuccessful.

BFS opened in September 2011 with Year 7 only, so was unable to accommodate pupils from St. Ursula's who were entering Year 8 or above. Primary pupils from the original St. Ursula's school were accommodated at St Ursula's E-ACT Academy, which also opened in September 2011, and therefore were able to remain at the original St. Ursula's site.

PAG submitted another secondary free school bid in 2013 to cater for senior pupils at the St. Ursula's site. In the meantime the St. Ursula's E-ACT Academy said it would consider expanding to provide Secondary places if there was enough parental demand.

== Badge and motto ==
The school's badge and motto was known as the Mercy Shield or Misericordia Shield and is the insignia of the Order of the Sisters of Mercy. It has been a symbol of mercy since the thirteenth century. The motto 'Dominus Illuminatio Mea' is Latin for 'The Lord is my Light'. The Saint Ursula's Serviam badge is a field of seven stars representing The Little Bear Constellation, known as Ursa Minor.

== Building and site ==
The main building is large with a clock tower. It is a Grade II listed building. There was a sports hall and large playing fields, a forest area and a small garden behind in an estate covering a total of 9 acres (3.6 ha). There were a number of "quads" around the school, some with religious statues and gardens. On the top floor of the school (with the little single square windows) were the old rooms where the boarders used to sleep. They also used to sleep in rooms along the corridor which later housed the kitchen, offices and the senior department library. At the front of the school, next to the main gate, there is a graveyard for the nuns of the Sisters of Mercy.
