= Geoff Gollop =

British politician (born 1955)

Geoff Gollop OBE
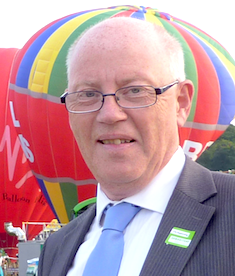

Deputy Mayor of Bristol
- In office 2012–2016
- Leader: George Ferguson
- Preceded by: Position established
- Succeeded by: Craig Cheney (Finance, Governance and Performance); Asher Craig (Communities, Events and Equalities)

Lord Mayor of Bristol
- In office 2011–2011
- Preceded by: Colin Smith
- Succeeded by: Peter Main

Deputy Lord Mayor of Bristol
- In office 2012–2012
- Leader: Peter Main
- Preceded by: Colin Smith
- Succeeded by: Peter Main

Councillor for Westbury-on-Trym and Henleaze
- In office 2001–2024

Personal details
- Born: Geoffrey Richard Gollop; 23 February 1955 (age 71)
- Party: Conservative (since 1973)
- Spouse: Bernice (m. 1990 or 1991)
- Children: 2
- Education: Clifton College; Fitzwilliam College, Cambridge
- Profession: Accountant politician

Geoffrey Richard Gollop, OBE (born 23 February 1955) is a British Conservative politician. He was a councillor on Bristol City Council from 2001 to 2024 and deputy mayor of Bristol from 2012 to 2016. He stood unsuccessfully as the Conservative candidate for the first directly elected mayor of Bristol in 2012.

== Personal life ==
Gollop was born at Bristol Maternity Hospital and has lived his entire life in Bristol, having been brought up in Henbury, where he attended Blaise Primary School. He then attended Clifton College, and after that went up to Fitzwilliam College, Cambridge. Thereafter he trained in accounting, became a Chartered Accountant and worked in accounting firms, before being made redundant and setting up his own business. Geoff Gollop & Co merged with accounting firm Milsted Langdon in 2013, with Gollop joining the latter as a director.

Gollop is married to Bernice and has two children, Mark and Hermione. He is a Methodist and supports Bristol Rovers F.C. and Bristol City F.C. His other interests include musical theatre and travel. He joined the Conservative Party in 1973. He is a former school governor of Henbury School and Henleaze Junior School, and a former church warden of St Mary's Church, Henbury.

== Political career ==
Gollop was inspired to enter local politics by the issue of secondary education and by his father Philip, a former Councillor for the Henbury ward.

Gollop was first elected as a Conservative Councillor on Bristol City Council in the June 2001 local election, representing the Westbury-on-Trym ward. He was re-elected several times, representing Westbury-on-Trym and later the Westbury-on-Trym and Henleaze ward, until losing the ward to the Liberal Democrats in the May 2024 local election.

In 2011-12, Gollop served in the ceremonial role of lord mayor of Bristol, and in 2012-13 he served as the deputy lord mayor.

In November 2011, Gollop was the victim of an arson attack on his car, for which the Informal Anarchist Federation claimed responsibility.

On 7 August 2012, he was selected to be the Conservative candidate for the first directly elected mayor of Bristol, having defeated former three-time lord mayor and Bristol City Council's Conservative group leader, Peter Abraham, and former councillor, Barbara Lewis. Receiving support from the mayor of London, Boris Johnson, Gollop campaigned on transport, education, inequality and Council culture. His specific policies included a freeze or reduction in Council Tax, lower fares on public transport, and business rates relief for independent shops. In the election on 15 November, Gollop lost to independent candidate George Ferguson, coming third, with 9.13% of the first-preference votes, behind Ferguson and the Labour Party candidate Marvin Rees. Gollop attributed the result to "a real disillusionment with party politics".

After the election, Mayor Ferguson assembled a "rainbow cabinet" of councillors from several parties, appointing Gollop as his deputy mayor and cabinet member with responsibility for finance and corporate services.
