= Becket Keys Church of England School =

- Becket Keys school badge

Location
- Sawyers Hall Lane; Brentwood, Essex, CM15 9DA; England; 51.6269°N 0.3016°E

Information
- Type: Free school
- Motto: Faith in learning – Et in Doctrina Fidei
- Religious affiliation: Church of England
- Established: 2012
- Department for Education URN: 138239 Tables
- Ofsted: Reports
- Headteacher: Andrew Scott-Evans
- Gender: Coeducational
- Age: 11 to 18
- Enrolment: 950
- Colours: Purple; Gold; Black; Grey
- Website: http://www.becketkeys.org/

Becket Keys Church of England School is a free school established in Brentwood, Essex, England in 2012. It was the first Church of England secondary school to be established as part of the free schools programme. The school is sponsored by Russell Education Trust. It is one of 24 Outstanding Secondary Schools in Essex. According to The Sunday Times Parent Power Guide 2024 is the 4th best school of its type in East Anglia.

The head teacher of Becket Keys is Andrew Scott-Evans. He was also the original proposer for the school. The school was officially dedicated by Bishop John Wraw on 5 October 2012. Mr. Scott-Evans' significant contribution has been recognised by the Bishop of Chelmsford who gave him the honour of becoming a Canon of Chemlsford Cathedral in April 2024.

== Inspections ==
The school received a judgement of Outstanding at its first full Ofsted inspection in May 2014. The school also received a judgement of Outstanding at its first full Church of England inspection in January 2016. It was inspected again by SIAMS in December 2023 and was given another excellent report. The school received another OfSTED inspection in February 2025 and was graded as Outstanding in all areas.

== Pre-opening history ==
The idea for Becket Keys Church of England School was put forward by Andrew Scott Evans who was then the head teacher of St Thomas of Canterbury Junior School and Iain Gunn head teacher of St Peter's Primary School South Weald. They said there was a need for a Church of England secondary school in Brentwood, as there were eleven Church of England primaries, but no equivalent secondary option. They formed a project steering group, comprising local parents; local primary head-teachers; and the Diocese of Chelmsford. In April 2011 the group selected the Russell Education Trust as their educational partner. Collectively they formed the Becket Keys CofE Free School Trust.

In June 2011, the Becket Keys CofE Free School Trust submitted a Free School proposal to the Department for Education (DfE) along with evidence of support from over 1,100 local parents. They were interviewed by the DfE about their proposal on 9 August 2011, and just over a month later they were granted approval by the Secretary of State for Education to establish the school.

Andrew Scott Evans was appointed as the school's founding head-teacher in February 2012.

A statutory public consultation period ran from March to April 2012, after which the school proposers signed a Model Funding Agreement with the Secretary of State.

The school opened in September 2012 with 123 Year 7 pupils, and nine teachers.

=== Opposition & Criticism ===
The statutory consultation that preceded the signing of the free school funding agreement, received 212 responses, of which 22 (10.5%) were against the Becket Keys CofE Free School Trust entering into an agreement with the Secretary of State.

The approval of Becket Keys was opposed by some people who wanted the Sawyers Hall Lane site to be used for a studio school or a university technical college instead.

The appointment of the founding head-teacher attracted comment because he had not previously taught at a Secondary School.

Feedback received during the pre-opening statutory consultation led to a change in the school's proposed admissions policy, which in turn resulted in criticism from some of the school's original supporters. The admissions policy of the school has drawn criticism from other people too.

The opening of the school in September 2012 was blamed by some people for a drop in pupil numbers at two other local secondary schools. The Department for Education later released the impact assessment used in their decision to open the school, and by 2014, following improvements in performance, all but one of the secondary schools in Brentwood was full.

As a new school Becket Keys benefited from a start-up grant to cover its initial set-up costs. A local newspaper claimed that Becket Keys students would therefore receive more funding per head compared to students in established local schools, but that claim was refuted by the school's headteacher.

=== New Buildings and Facilities ===
The school has received Government funding for new buildings. T&B Contractors have completed two phases of extensive improvement works. Firstly a £3,400,000 phase 1 programme was completed which ensured the school opened on time and made the site secure with a new boundary fence and wall. Secondly, a £4,000,000 refurbishment programme of the buildings was concluded in 2015. These extensive works included landscaping, new security systems, redecorating every area of the school, installing new windows and doors, new heating and lighting. Also at this time all the new ICT infrastructure was installed. The IT management company Joskos have said that the Russell Education Trust is one of their most significant customers with £750,000 being spent with the supplier.

In 2017, Becket Keys added a new teaching block, 'The Welby Building', to house its new sixth form. This new building was opened by Bishop Stephen Cotterell.

In 2018, Becket Keys added a new Sports Hall. This was opened by Ryan Fredericks (West Ham FC) in September 2018
