= King's School, Hove =

- King's School Logo

Location
- Hangleton Way; Hangleton, East Sussex, BN3 8BN; England

Information
- Type: Free school
- Religious affiliation: Christian
- Established: 2013
- Department for Education URN: 139409 Tables
- Ofsted: Reports
- Headteacher: Sarah Price
- Gender: Coeducational
- Age: 11 to 19
- Capacity: 1170 (by 2020)
- Website: www.kingsschoolhove.org.uk

King's School, Hove is an 11-19 free school of Christian designation. It is an ecumenical school, although it is not a CofE School, it has roots with the Church of England.

The school was originally established on a temporary site in Portslade. In September 2019 the school moved to its permanent site in Hangleton. In early 2020, it was severely damaged by Storm Ciara leading to the temporary closure of the school.

Currently it also serves families in the BN3 postcode area. It opened in September 2013 with its first cohort of Year 7 students. The first headteacher was Mr Steve Flavin. The present headteacher is Mrs Sarah Price.

King's School was established by the Russell Education Trust, working with local parents. The school has moved to a purpose-built site in Hangleton which has 3 floors, a multi-usage sports area, and a sixth form centre set to be open by 2023.

== Ofsted Inspections ==
It was first inspected by Ofsted in June 2015 and received an overall judgement of 'good' with outstanding leadership and management and outstanding pupil behaviour and safety.

A short inspection was carried out by Mark Bagust on 17 January 2019 and the school retained their ‘Good’ status. In the summer of 2018, 83% of pupils received a Grade 4, or above, in English and 81% gained Grade 4, or above, in Maths.
