= Westbury-on-Trym and Henleaze =

Electoral ward in Bristol, England

Coordinates: 51.4930°N 2.6196°W

- ward Bristol City Council
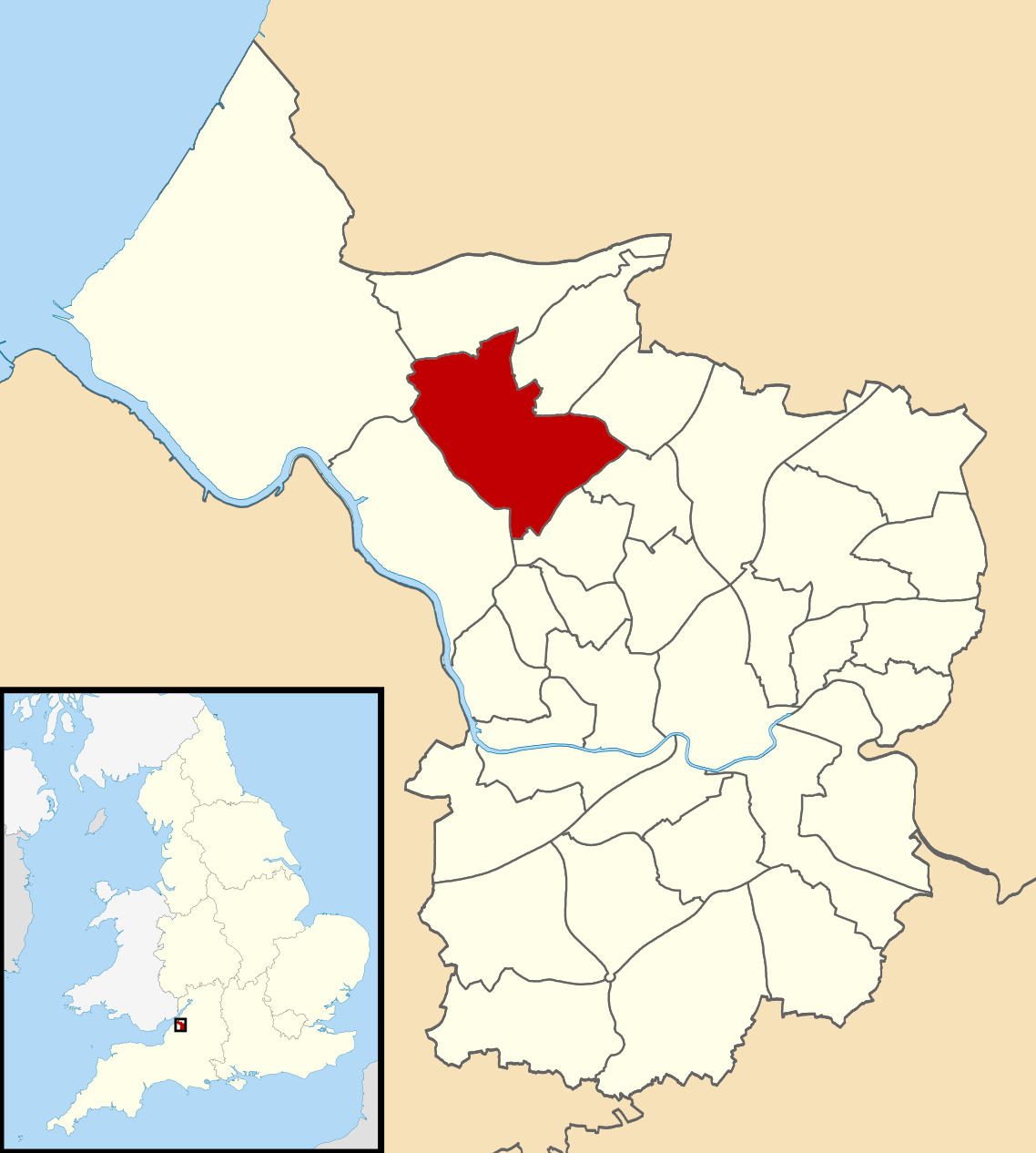
- Ward boundaries since 2016.
- County: Bristol
- Population: 20,420
- Electorate: 15,278

Current ward
- Created: 2016
- Councillor: Caroline Gooch (Liberal Democrats)
- Councillor: Stephen Williams (Liberal Democrats)
- Councillor: Nicholas Coombes (Liberal Democrats)
- UK Parliament constituency: Bristol North West

Westbury-on-Trym and Henleaze is an electoral ward in Bristol, England, covering the neighbourhoods of Henleaze and Westbury-on-Trym in the north-western suburbs of the city. It is represented by three members of Bristol City Council, which as of 2024 are Nicholas Coombes, Caroline Gooch and former government minister Stephen Williams, all Liberal Democrats.

The ward was created ahead of the 2016 United Kingdom local elections, following a boundary review by the Local Government Boundary Commission for England. Previously, Westbury-on-Trym and Henleaze were two separate council wards, with a slightly different boundary.

== Area Profile ==
Westbury-on-Trym, in the north-west of the ward, was once a village separate from Bristol, before the built-up area spread to incorporate it, and it retains a distinct village centre focal point. Henleaze, in the south-east, is a primarily residential suburb of Victorian and interwar housing. In the south, the ward also contains the northern part of Westbury Park, included the northern periphery of Durdham Down. In the north, it extends to the summit of Henbury Hill, and in the west to the edge of Coombe Dingle. The ward does not include the area between Eastfield Road and Doncaster Road, which includes Henleaze Lake and is typically considered to be part of the Henleaze neighbourhood; to ensure wards have equal sized electorates, this area is instead in Southmead ward.

At the 2021 United Kingdom census, Westbury-on-Trym and Henleaze had a population of 20,420. The ward has a comparatively large population of pensionable age, with 23.5% aged 65 or older, versus the 18.3% Bristol average, and 4.5% of the population live in care homes, compared to the Bristol average of 2.0%. Fewer residents were born outside of the UK (12.4%) than the Bristol average (18.8%), and a lower proportion are BAME (10.0%) than the Bristol average (18.9%). Residents are significantly more likely to have a university degree, at 62.2%, than the 42.1% Bristol average.

Westbury-on-Trym and Henleaze has comparatively low levels of deprivation, with most areas of the ward falling in the least deprived decile of areas in England. It has the lowest rate of child poverty in the city, at 3.0%, compared to the 21.8 Bristol average, and children in the ward have the highest educational attainment in the city measured by Attainment 8, at 63.6%, compared to the 44.9% Bristol average. Life expectancy is significantly higher than the Bristol average (female 84.2 years vs 82.6; male 82.2 vs 77.8), and premature mortality is significantly lower than average. Unemployment benefit claimant rates are the lowest in Bristol, at 1.05% (3.41% Bristol average); as are pension credit rates (4.25% vs 13.04%).

Median house prices in the ward are the highest in Bristol, at £683,000 in March 2023. Housing in the ward is significantly more likely to be owner-occupied, at 81.2%, than the 54.9% Bristol average, and significantly less likely to be social rented (5.5% vs 18.7 Bristol average). The ward has a large amount of detached housing (19.4% vs 6.0% Bristol average) and semi-detached housing (42.4% vs 26.6%), compared to the wider Bristol area, where apartments and terraced housing are more common. There is a high rate of car ownership in the ward, with just 13.2% of households living without a car, compared to the 26.2% Bristol average.

For elections to the Parliament of the United Kingdom, Westbury-on-Trym and Henleaze is in Bristol North West constituency.

== Local elections ==
=== 2024 election ===
The 2024 United Kingdom local elections saw a strong nationwide swing away from the Conservative Party, who suffered their worst local election defeat since 1996. In Bristol, this was seen in Westbury-on-Trym and Henleaze ward, where former deputy mayor Geoff Gollop lost the seat.

Westbury-on-Trym & Henleaze (3 seats)
Party	Candidate	Votes	%	±%
Liberal Democrats	Caroline Gooch	3,401	43.08	+15.25
Liberal Democrats	Stephen Williams	3,095	39.21	+20.92
Liberal Democrats	Nicholas Coombes	3,049	38.62	+23.27
Conservative	Geoff Gollop*	2,599	32.92	−5.59
Conservative	Steve Smith*	2,340	29.64	−3.47
Conservative	Sharon Anne Scott*	2,212	28.02	−2.35
Labour	Miranda McCabe	1,351	17.11	−2.53
Labour	Ellie Milone	1,290	16.34	−2.53
Labour	Thomas Phipps	1,104	13.99	−3.20
Green	Daniella Elsa Radice	1,100	13.93	−6.11
Green	Nathaniel Joyce	830	10.51	−6.93
Green	Murali Thoppil	680	8.61	−8.17
Turnout		7,894	51.67	−5.54
Liberal Democrats gain from Conservative				
Liberal Democrats gain from Conservative				
Liberal Democrats gain from Conservative				

=== 2021 election ===
Westbury-on-Trym & Henleaze (3 seats)
Party	Candidate	Votes	%	±%
Conservative	Geoff Gollop	3,389	38.51	−5.52
Conservative	Steve Smith	2,914	33.11	−7.24
Conservative	Sharon Anne Scott	2,673	30.38	−4.76
Liberal Democrats	Caroline Gooch	2,449	27.83	−8.07
Green	Georgia Barnes	1,764	20.05	+5.75
Labour	Lesley Miranda McCabe	1,729	19.65	+2.24
Liberal Democrats	Simon Cook	1,609	18.28	−7.82
Labour	Sam Taylor-Elliott	1,580	17.95	+4.45
Green	Alex Dunn	1,535	17.44	+3.14
Labour	Simon Mark Geoffrey Crew	1,512	17.18	+3.70
Green	Robin Coode	1,477	16.78	+16.78
Liberal Democrats	Christopher Harris	1,351	15.35	−5.32
Turnout		8,800	57.21	−3.35
Conservative hold				
Conservative hold				
Conservative gain from Liberal Democrats				

=== 2016 election ===
Westbury-on-Trym & Henleaze (3 seats)
Party	Candidate	Votes	%	±%
Conservative	Geoff Gollop	4,019	44.03	
Conservative	Liz Radford	3,683	40.35	
Liberal Democrats	Clare Campion-Smith	3,277	35.90	
Conservative	Alastair Peter Lindsay Watson	3,207	35.14	
Liberal Democrats	Helen Jessica Cuellar	2,382	26.10	
Liberal Democrats	Graham Christopher Donald	1,887	20.67	
Labour	Lesley Miranda McCabe	1,589	17.41	
Green	Sharmila Elizabeth Bousa	1,305	14.30	
Labour	Jon Moore	1,232	13.50	
Labour	Barry Thompson Trahar	1,230	13.48	
Green	George Simon Calascione	820	8.98	
Turnout		9,127	60.56	
Conservative win (new seat)				
Conservative win (new seat)				
Liberal Democrats win (new seat)				
