= Westbury Park, Bristol =

Suburb of Bristol, England

Coordinates: 51.4788°N 2.6121°W

Westbury Park
- Location within Bristol
- OS grid reference: ST574757
- Unitary authority: Bristol
- Ceremonial county: Bristol
- Region: South West
- Country: England
- Sovereign state: United Kingdom
- Post town: BRISTOL
- Postcode district: BS6
- Dialling code: 0117
- Police: Avon and Somerset
- Fire: Avon
- Ambulance: South Western
- UK Parliament: Bristol North West, Bristol Central

Westbury Park is a suburb of the city of Bristol, United Kingdom. It lies to the east of Durdham Down between the districts of Redland and Henleaze. The area is very similar in character to nearby Redland and comprises mainly Victorian and early twentieth-century architecture, along with a selection of Georgian buildings. Many of these buildings still have their original house names and many Victorian artifacts have been found in the gardens of Westbury Park.

The area was once part of the parish of Westbury-on-Trym, from which it takes its name.

Westbury Park Primary School lies in the southern side of the area and was established in 1893.

Major roads within Westbury Park include North View, Coldharbour Road, Linden Road and Redland Road.

== Politics ==
For elections to Bristol City Council, Westbury Park is split between the ward of Redland and the ward of Westbury-on-Trym and Henleaze.

For elections to the UK Parliament, the parts of Westbury Park that are in Redland ward are in the Bristol Central constituency; the Westbury-on-Trym and Henleaze ward is in Bristol North West.

== Transport ==
Westbury Park is served by bus service 1, 2 and 3 operated by First West of England, which connect Bristol city centre with Cribbs Causeway by various routes. First also operates the U1, running between the city centre and Stoke Bishop and serving Westbury Park. It is also served by bus service 505, operated by Bristol Community Transport and links Long Ashton with Southmead Hospital.

== Churches ==
Several churches lie within Westbury Park, including Westbury Park Church, St Alban's Church, Etloe Evangelical Church, Cairns Road Baptist Church and Westbury Park Spiritualist Church.
