= Catherine B. Gulley =

English artist (1869–1960)

"Memories" (1924)

Catherine Biggs Gulley (11 May 1869 – 27 May 1960) was an English watercolour portrait and genre painter who lived and worked in Bristol. Being a member of the Royal West of England Academy, she regularly exhibited her works there. Her paintings often reflected the sentimental tastes fashionable in the Edwardian period.

Her works were exhibited in Birmingham, Liverpool, Manchester and the Royal Academy. The first to be shown at the Academy in 1908 was titled, "Finishing touches" and the final in 1962 was painted when she was living at Westbury-on-Trym, Bristol.
