= Gaunts Ham Park =

Park in Bristol, England

- Lincoln Park
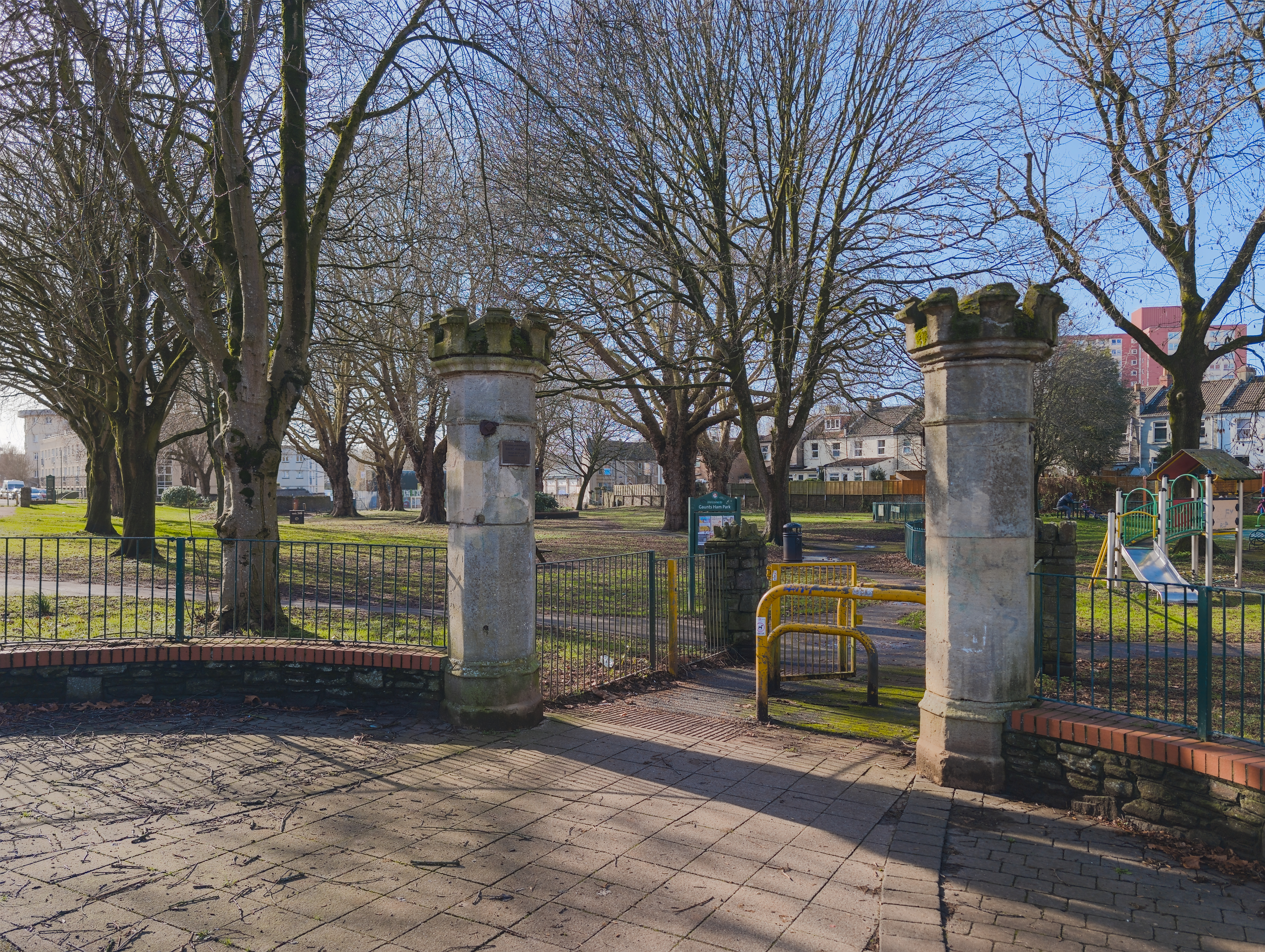
- The Lincoln Street entrance of Gaunts Ham Park
- Interactive map of Gaunts Ham Park
- Type: Urban park
- Location: Lawrence Hill, Bristol, England
- Coordinates: 51.4568°N 2.5671°W
- Area: 0.6 hectares (1.5 acres)
- Opened: 29 September 1887
- Designer: George Culley Ashmead
- Owner: Bristol City Council
- Operator: Bristol City Council
- Status: Open all year
- Designation: Local Historic Park and Garden
- Public transit: Lawrence Hill railway station
- Facilities: Multi-use games area, playground, youth shelter

Gaunts Ham Park, known locally as Lincoln Park, is a public urban park and playground located on Lincoln Street in the Lawrence Hill area of Bristol, England. Covering approximately 0.6 hectares (1.5 acres), it serves as a green space for the densely populated inner-city wards of Barton Hill and St Philip's. The site is designated by Bristol City Council as a Local Historic Park and Garden.

Originally part of the medieval estate of Gaunt's Hospital, the land was acquired by the Bristol Corporation following the dissolution of the monasteries. Prior to its designation as a public space, the site was utilised for coal mining and agriculture. It was established as a municipal recreation ground in the late 19th century to serve the growing working-class population, with a formal layout designed by the Corporation Surveyor George Culley Ashmead.

The park's landscape is characterised by mature London plane trees and includes modern amenities such as a multi-use games area and play equipment. Throughout the 20th and 21st centuries, the park has been the subject of various redevelopment schemes and has frequently been a focal point for community safety initiatives, that have aimed to mitigate anti-social behaviour and drug-related crime.

== History ==
=== Early history ===
The land comprising the park was originally part of the estate of Gaunt's Hospital, a charitable foundation established in 1220 next to St Mark's Church. Following the dissolution of the monasteries, the hospital's assets, including two acres of land at Barton Hill known as Gaunts Ham, were sold to the Bristol Corporation by Henry VIII in 1541.

Prior to its development as a park, the site was utilised for industrial and agricultural purposes; as a market garden, the plot yielded an annual rental income of £13. In 1793, the municipal authority leased the mineral rights for coal extraction to a partnership consisting of T. Haynes, W. Jacks, and J. Hughes; the 28-year agreement stipulated a royalty payment of one-eighth of the mined product. By 1828, Plumley and Ashley’s map showed the site as still mostly open land, with a ropewalk indicated along its north-western edge. By the 1870s, the site was characterised as a "great hollow" bordered by an open sewer. While considered unfit for housing, its location adjacent to the Midland Railway's coal branch made it potentially useful for industrial purposes.

=== 19th century ===
By the 1880s, the dense urbanisation of the St Philip's district necessitated the creation of open spaces for the working-class population. On 18 August 1887, the Sanitary Committee approved the laying out of Gaunts Ham, for which the committee paid an annual rent of £40. The initial proposal for the park involved utilizing a specific parcel of Corporation land measuring 2 acres, 0 roods, and 10 perches. Alderman Naish, who proposed the original scheme, noted that the site sat in a "great hollow" and required significant infilling to raise the ground level; he jokingly suggested to the committee that a sign reading "Rubbish may be shot here" would quickly resolve the issue.

Financing the project required a loan of £52,000 which covered Gaunts Ham alongside parks in Bedminster and Stapleton, with the council aiming to secure a repayment term of 30 years. During a government inquiry in 1888 regarding the financing of the park, the Town Clerk assured inspectors that the lease arrangement with the Sanitary Authority was permanent to secure the necessary loans, while the City Engineer estimated the initial layout costs at £800. By July 1889, negotiations were underway to acquire additional land to extend the park's boundaries before the final layout was completed.

The development process was physically difficult; in 1890, residents complained that the leveling process was delayed and that the surface remained "ankle deep" in mud and sand. In March 1891, the City Council resolved to borrow £5,600 to fund the laying out of Gaunts Ham alongside Windmill Hill and St. Andrew’s parks, a sum that was subsequently increased to £9,200 later that year. The park's layout was designed by the Bristol Corporation's Surveyor, George Culley Ashmead. On 12 May 1891, a tender of £653 submitted by August Krauss for undertaking the works was accepted. While the initial loan estimates for fencing and gates were set at £600, the total expenditure for the park's establishment eventually rose to £1,853—an overspend of £400 above the sanctioned amount. This additional cost covered the installation of urinals, a caretaker's shelter, and entrance alterations. The physical layout, including grassing, rockery installation, and a railed-off asphalt area for children, was executed by Krauss. The park was officially opened to the public on 29 September 1887, although development works continued into the following decade.

Early amenities included a pavilion and a drinking fountain manufactured by MacFarlane & Co., which was donated by local Member of Parliament Joseph Dodge Weston in February 1892. The drinking fountain, which bore the inscription "Presented by Sir Joseph D. Weston M.P. February, 1892" at request of a Mr Swaish, was located near the Elizabeth Street entrance but was removed in the 20th century. Upon opening, the park operated under strict bye-laws. Hours were regulated from 7:00 am to 10:00 pm in the summer and 8:00 am to 5:30 pm in the winter. The rules prohibited specific nuisances, including the beating of carpets, the drying of linen, and the unauthorised sale of goods.

=== 20th century ===
In 1927, the City Council rejected a proposal to increase estimates by £100 to install tennis courts at the site, arguing that the park was too small and that construction would interfere with existing trees. In January 1936, the Planning and Public Works Committee invited tenders for the construction of a reinforced concrete shelter measuring 35 feet by 14 feet.

During the Second World War, the park was utilised for civil defence purposes, serving as a barrage balloon site. An underground air raid shelter was constructed at the western end of the park. This reinforced concrete tunnel shelter, measuring approximately 9 metres square, was designed to protect civilians during the Bristol Blitz. In September 1939, the park was officially listed by the local Air Raid Precautions Committee as a site for public shelter trenches.

Following the war, municipal austerity measures impacted the site; in 1951, planned landscaping and "beauty treatments" for Gaunts Ham were indefinitely postponed by the Parks Superintendent to keep the city rate down. Due to the park's proximity to the railway sidings at Barrow Road Bridge, park users in the 1950s would end up being covered in soot from the locomotives. In 1961, the City Engineer suggested the removal of the air-raid shelter to reclaim land for children's play areas, citing Home Office approval for such clearances, although the structure remained buried beneath the surface. Despite its condition, a 1961 report described the park as "a small oasis in a sea of development" that was vital to the area, even if it was no longer a "wholly attractive section" of the city's open spaces.

In the post-war period, the park faced issues with antisocial behaviour. In 1953, following a petition from residents regarding "rowdyism" and damage to property, the Planning and Public Works Committee allocated £400 to reinstall fencing and gates to close the park at night, replacing railings that had been removed during the war. During the 1953 inspection, local residents complained that trees were being damaged by youths and that the air-raid shelter was being misused for illicit encounters. One councillor, Kate Gleeson, remarked that the area was so noisy that "if anyone was ever murdered in the Gaunts Ham Park [...] no one would ever know because the noise from the park would drown out the screams".

The footprint of the park was expanded in the 1960s following the demolition of some terraced housing on Lincoln Street and the clearance of a 10-acre area. In 1969, a £15,000 city-wide scheme to address derelict sites included specific allocations for Barton Hill. Funds were designated to clear and grass over properties at 47–51 and 53–59 Chancery Street, with the intention of incorporating this land into Gaunts Ham Park or closing part of Peter’s Terrace to extend the park's boundary.

Development continued into the 1970s. In 1974, the Open Spaces Committee allocated funds to convert a small warehouse adjacent to the park's extension into a maintenance depot to serve the Easton and Barton Hill districts. A remodelling was completed in 1980 as part of a £69,000 scheme across six inner-city parks. The 1980 landscaping project, however, drew criticism from some elderly residents, who viewed the digging up of existing turf and paths as a "terrible waste" of public money during a period of austerity, arguing that the park had been suitable prior to the intervention.

== Facilities ==
The park currently functions as a community recreation ground within a dense urban setting. It is accessible via entrances on Ducie Road and Tenby Street. Current amenities include a playground equipped with rockers, a carousel, an adventure trail, swings, and a toddler multi-play unit. For older children and teenagers, the park offers a games area, a tower with a basketball hoop, and a meeting shelter. While the original Victorian gate piers at the Elizabeth Street and Tenby Street entrances remain extant, the iron gates and the ornamental drinking fountain have been removed.

== Social issues ==
Gaunts Ham Park has been the focus of community safety initiatives and regeneration strategies. Academic research has found that newcomers and residents have identified Gaunts Ham Park as a valued green resource that offers a reprieve from the built environment that contrasts with the area's industrial history.

The park has suffered from a reputation among some local residents as unsafe, with reports of drug use and poor lighting. In January 2022, a police sweep of the park recovered a saw hidden in the undergrowth. In September of the same year, officers arrested two men and seized a zombie knife and Class A drugs following patrols targeting open drug dealing.

As part of the 2024 Bristol City Council draft Local Plan for the Lawrence Hill area, proposals were brought forward to mitigate crime in the park by redesigning the streetscape. These plans suggested potentially reducing the size of the playground and green space to improve security, and reinvesting resources into a new central plaza at nearby Berkeley Court.

== See also ==
- Parks of Bristol
