= Westbury-on-Trym =

Suburb of Bristol, England

Coordinates: 51.4930°N 2.6196°W

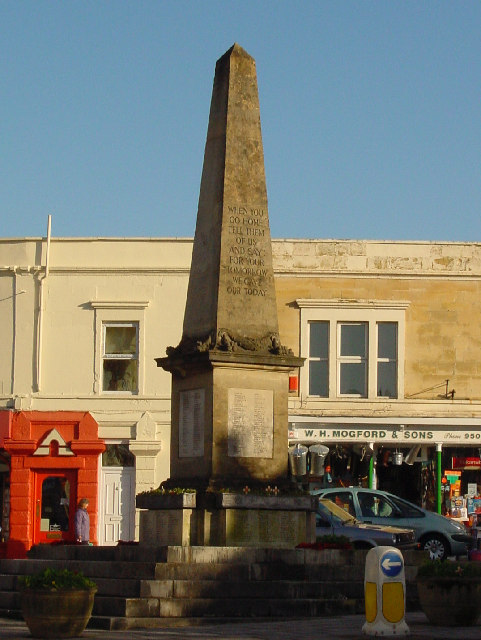
- Westbury-on-Trym War Memorial

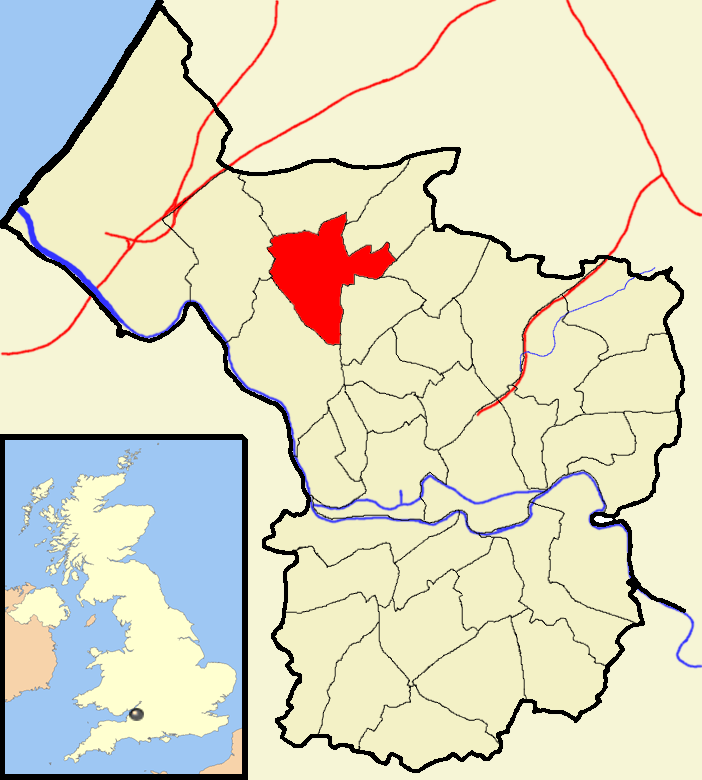
- Boundaries of the 1999-2016 city council ward
- Population: 10,754 (2011.Ward)
- OS grid reference: ST570773
- Unitary authority: Bristol
- Region: South West
- Country: England
- Sovereign state: United Kingdom
- Post town: BRISTOL
- Postcode district: BS9/10
- Dialling code: 0117
- Police: Avon and Somerset
- Fire: Avon
- Ambulance: South Western
- UK Parliament: Bristol North West

Westbury-on-Trym (sometimes written without hyphenation) is a suburb in the north of the City of Bristol, near the suburbs of Stoke Bishop, Westbury Park, Henleaze, Southmead and Henbury, in the southwest of England.

The place is partly named after the River Trym, which flows through it.

For elections to Bristol City Council, the area is part of Westbury-on-Trym and Henleaze electoral ward. From 1974 to 2016, Westbury-on-Trym was itself an electoral ward, initially electing 3 members to Bristol City Council and 1 member to Avon County Council, and later electing 2 members to the city council after ward boundary changes in 1999.

== History ==
The origins of Westbury-on-Trym predate those of Bristol itself. In the 6th century Westbury was in the territory of Hwicce, which became part of Mercia in the 7th century.

The earliest record of Westbury, in the form Uuestburg, was in a charter dated between 793 and 796. -burg or -bury was from the Old English burh, which usually meant a fort but could also mean a fortified house or a minster. The name may refer to a minster already present on the site of the parish church in the 8th century. It is not clear why the burh was "west". It possibly referred to the westernmost minster in the territory of Hwicce.

At the end of the 8th century, King Offa of Mercia granted land at Westbury to his minister, Aethelmund. Early in the 9th century land at Westbury passed to the Bishop of Worcester. Later there was a monastery at Westbury, probably initially a secular one, with married clergy. This changed towards the end of the 10th century when Oswald of Worcester, in whose diocese the monastery lay, sent a party of 12 monks to follow more stringent rules at the Westbury monastery. The architect Ednoth constructed a new church and other buildings.

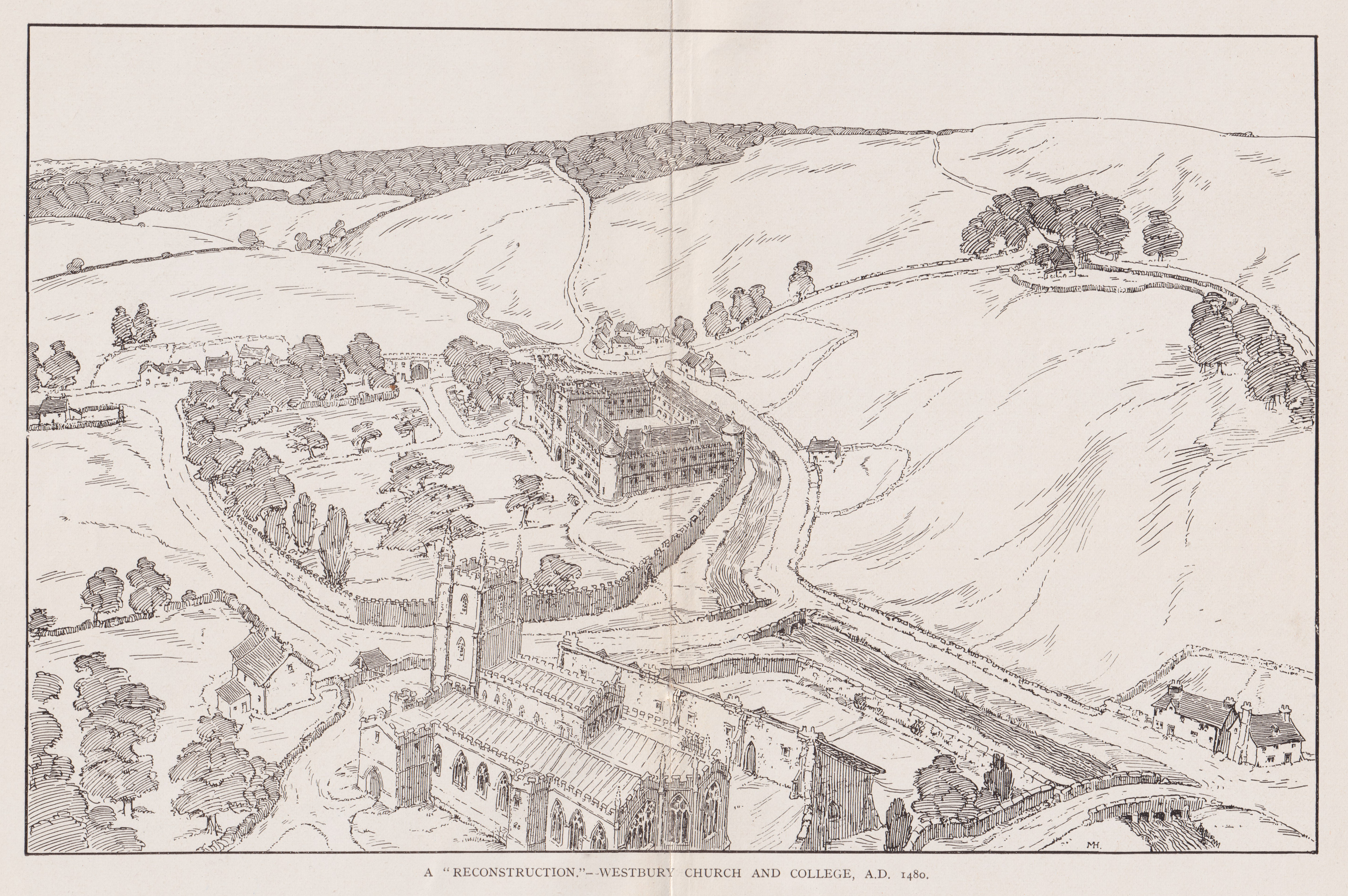
Reconstruction drawing of Westbury c.1480

The monastery became a college with a dean and canons at the end of the 13th century. It was rebuilt in the mid-15th century to resemble a miniature castle with turrets and a gatehouse. Westbury College was dissolved in 1544 and became a private house. The Royalist Prince Rupert of the Rhine used it as his quarters during the English Civil War. When he left, in 1643, he ordered it to be set on fire so that the Parliamentarians could not make use of it. In the 20th century some of the college buildings were restored. Westbury College Gatehouse passed into the hands of the National Trust and the grounds were adapted for housing elderly people.

The current Church of the Holy Trinity dates from 1194 (although there has been a place of worship on the site since 717), with an early 13th century nave and aisles, and 15th century chancel, chapels and tower. It is a grade I listed building.

In the 18th century, the area was associated with highway robbery. The churchyard contains the grave of coachman Richard Ruddle (d. 1743), who is reputed to be the last man in England killed by a highwayman while driving Sir Robert Cann across Durdham Down. Local legend suggests this event may be connected to the tradition of the "White Tree" on Westbury Road, originally painted white to guide coachmen home in the dark.

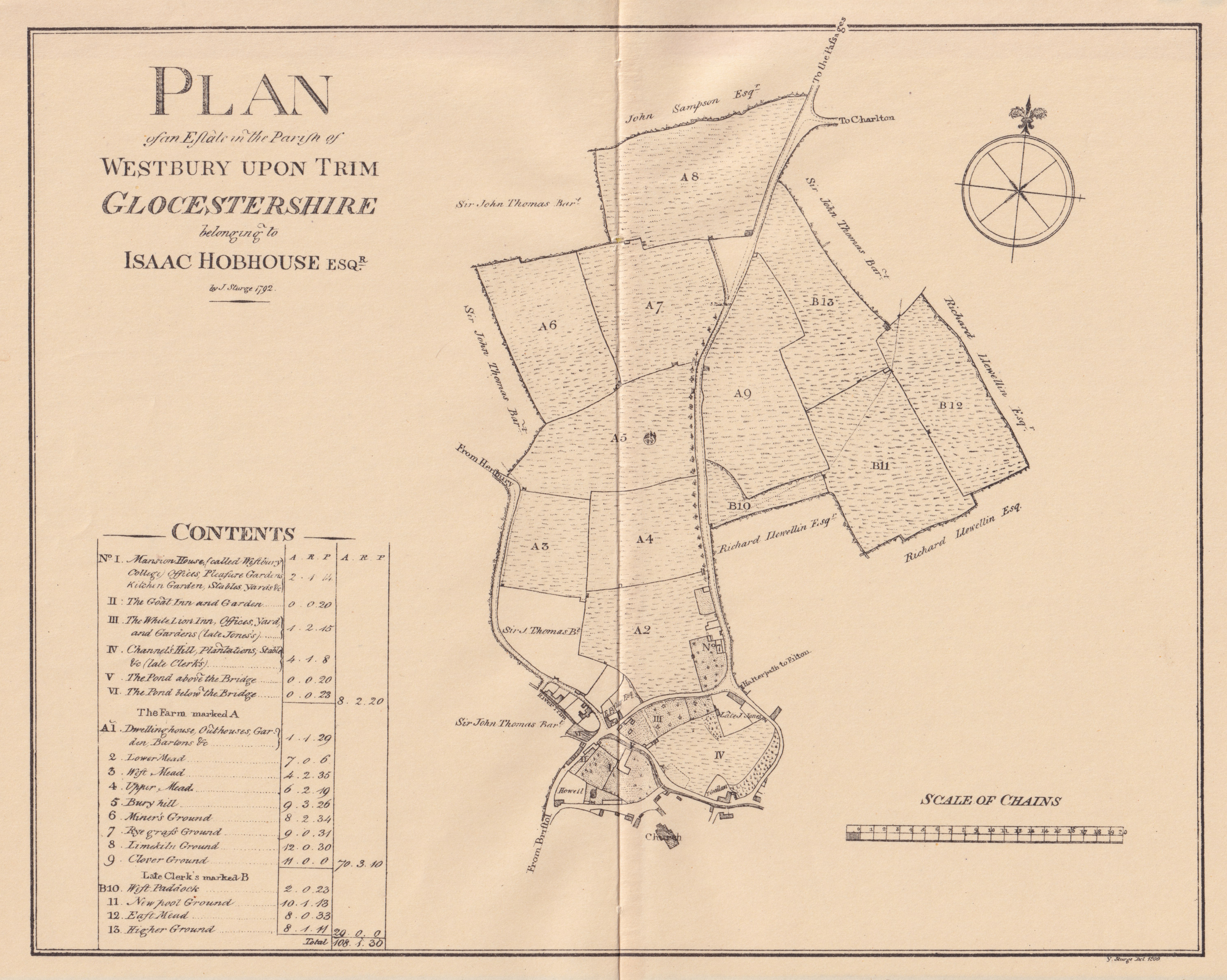
1792 plan of Westbury

The ancient parish of Westbury-on-Trym was a large one. It included Stoke Bishop, Redland, a large exclave comprising Shirehampton and Avonmouth, and several smaller exclaves in the parish of Henbury. When the civil parish was created in 1866, Shirehampton was separated to form its own civil parish, and in 1894 Redland also became a separate civil parish. On 1 October 1904 the civil parish was abolished and absorbed into Bristol. In 1901 the parish had a population of 6063. Redland remained in the ecclesiastical parish of Westbury until 1942.

Historically, the area was known for the manufacture of clay pipes. Residents of Chock Lane, where the industry was centred, have reported unearthing remnants of these pipes in their gardens.

Development of the village into a large suburb of Bristol was started in the 1920s and was well underway by the 30s. Many detached and semi-detached villas were built in this period. Apart from during World War II, major house building did not cease until the 60s.

Falcondale Road was constructed during the 1930s to act as a bypass to the narrow twisting streets of the old village. With the opening of the Filton Bypass in the late 30s, Falcondale Road acted as a major conduit for A38 holiday traffic going to and from the South West. However, when the Filton Bypass was split into two by the construction of the Brabazon Runway in the late 40s, A38 traffic had to be directed to the original route through Filton.

Westbury-on-Trym became a conservation area in 1971, one of the earliest in Bristol, the boundaries were expanded in 2015 to include the Southfield Road environs and Elmfield Lodge.

== Amenities ==
View of Canford Park

Westbury-on-Trym High Street has three Indian and one Thai restaurants, eight pubs and several cafés. The village centre is well-served for shoppers, containing banks and independent stores including book shops, craft stores, hardware shops, florists, and a number of charity shops. Two free car parks are available and a medium-sized supermarket, built on the site of the previous Carlton cinema, above which there is a ladies only gym. During 2001, a large Sainsbury's was proposed, but the opposition to the plan was so strong from local villagers that the supermarket construction was eventually scrapped. In November 2013 a Tesco Metro opened on the site of a closed pub (The Foresters Tavern) just off the central War Memorial in the Village, its coming had been the subject of much discussion in the village and had been strongly opposed by many.

Schools within the area include Elmlea Infant School, Elmlea Junior School, Bristol Free School and Westbury on Trym Church of England Academy. Independent schools include the prestigious girls' schools Badminton, which has taught pupils such as Indira Gandhi, Princess Haya of Jordan and the daughter of the Sultan of Brunei; and Redmaids', the oldest surviving girls' school in England.

A new doctors' surgery has been constructed for Westbury near to the Holy Trinity Church and the Westbury Hill Car Park. This replaces the previous surgery which was housed in a building on Falcondale Road.

Canford Park opened in 1874. Canford Cemetery opened in 1903, acquiring a crematorium in 1957.

== Transport ==
Transport routes include the A4018, which runs from the city centre to Cribbs Causeway. Westbury is served by bus routes 1, 10, 11, 13, 623 and service T7 also connects Westbury-on-Trym with Chepstow. The nearest railway station is Sea Mills station at Sea Mills.

== Notable residents ==
- Thomas Bridges (c. 1842–1898), an Anglican missionary and linguist, the first to set up a successful mission to the indigenous peoples in Tierra del Fuego, at the southern tip of South America, lived in Westbury in the 1840s.
- William Canynge, a wealthy Bristol merchant, was dean of Westbury College from 1469 to 1474.
- John Carpenter (1399–1476) was an English Bishop, Provost and University Chancellor who was baptised and buried in St Peter's Church, now called Holy Trinity Church, Westbury on Trym. The Westbury Harriers club have adapted Bishop John Carpenter's arms to use as their "crest."
- Joseph Cooper (broadcaster)
- Amelia Edwards the traveller, novelist and Egyptologist lived in Eastfield, at the eastern end of the village, from c. 1864 to 1892.
- Frank Evans, jazz guitarist.
- David Foot, journalist, broadcaster and author of 30 books.
- Geoff Gollop OBE, councillor for Westbury-on-Trym stood to become the first elected Mayor of Bristol in the elections of 15 November 2012 but was unsuccessful.
- Catherine B. Gulley, an English watercolour portrait and genre painter, lived at various addresses in Clifton and Westbury-on-Trym.
- John Henry Hirst (1826–1882), an architect who was based in Westbury-on-Trym, and died at his residence there, after designing listed buildings in Bristol and Harrogate.
- William Pennefather (1816–1873), the Irish-born clergyman noted for his hymns and sermons, went to school here in the late 1820s.
- Alice Roberts, paleopathologist and television presenter, brought up here and attended Redmaids'.
- Sunetra Sarker the actress lives in the area.
- Sir Theophilus Shepstone, British-South African statesman, born in Westbury-on-Trym and emigrated to Cape Colony (Cape of Good Hope) in South Africa at three years old.
- H. C. Sleigh (1867–1933), Australian businessman (founder of Golden Fleece Company) was born here.
- Robert Southey, who later in his life became one of the Lake poets and the Poet Laureate, lived in the village for a year in 1798–99, during which he wrote his Eclogues and much other poetry. His social circle at the time included the Wedgwoods of Cote House and chemist Humphry Davy, who was also living in Bristol then. Southey took part in Davy's experiments with laughing gas.
- Luke Spokes, the Chippenham Town F.C. footballer.
- Dolly Tree, actress, illustrator and Hollywood costume designer, born here.
- John Wedgwood, the horticulturist and eldest son of potter Josiah Wedgwood, lived at the old Cote House on the edge of Durdham Down from 1797 to 1806. The house, which had Gothic turrets and battlements, was demolished in 1925 to make way for retirement accommodation.
