= The Old Lodge, Bristol =

House in Bristol, England

Coordinates: 51.48698°N 2.60932°W

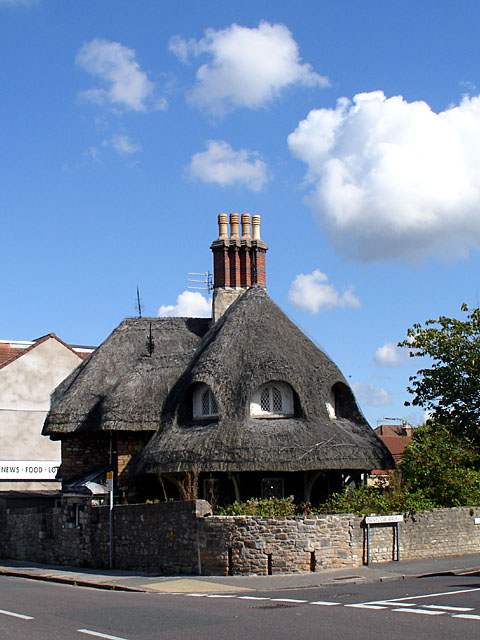
The Thatched Cottage in Bristol

The Old Lodge, also known as the Thatched Cottage and 166 Henleaze Road, is a notable landmark in Henleaze in Bristol, England. According to Reece Winstone, writing in 1970, this is the only privately owned thatched house in Bristol.

The house was built around 1810 and was formerly one of two former lodge houses to Henleaze Park, the residence of Samuel and Walter Derham. Henleaze Park later became St Margaret's School before being demolished in 1962.

It is a few miles from Blaise Hamlet, John Nash's collection of picturesque cottages. Although this cottage is very similar in character and was built around the same time, it has never been verified that John Nash also built this property.

The lodge's most unusual feature is the spy window on the ground floor that would have enabled the lodge keeper to view passing coaches from either the sitting or dining room.

It is a Grade II listed building, first listed in 1977.

== Notable dates ==
1958 The thatched roof, that had not been attended to for over 100 years, was renewed by Webbers of Dunster.

1977 The Department of the Environment listed the property (Grade II) for its historical interest and special architecture.

1994 The thatched roof was renewed by a Wiltshire firm in the traditional nineteenth century way.

1995 Following the rethatch, the property won an Environment Award from the Bristol Civic Society (in association with the Bristol Evening Post), one of only 10 in Bristol.
