= Russell Education Trust =

UK educational organisation

The Russell Education Trust (RET) is a multi-academy trust in the United Kingdom. It provides educational support services in the creation and operation of academies established as part of the free schools programme. It is a not-for-profit company limited by guarantee, with exempt charity status, regulated by the Department for Education. Its board members include educationalists and representatives from its schools' local governing bodies.

RET was established in 2010 by directors of the school improvement company Education London which, between 2003 and 2017, provided educational support services to government, notably as a service provider to the London Challenge, as well as to individual local authorities and schools. Education London ceased trading in 2017, but continues as community interest company EL (RET) to sponsor RET.

Both organisations were based in the same office building in Leatherhead, Surrey, until 2024 when they moved to Teddington.

The Russell Education Trust has worked in partnership with parents, communities, and diocesan authorities to establish the following free schools:

- Bristol Free School, established 2011
- Becket Keys Church of England School, established 2012
- King's School, Hove, established 2013
- St Andrew the Apostle Greek Orthodox School, established 2013
- Turing House School, established 2015

== Governance Model ==
RET established its first two free schools using the Single Academy Trust model that was in place at the time. It formed two sub-trusts, the Bristol Free School Trust and the Becket Keys CofE Free School Trust, which each signed free school funding agreements with the Secretary of State. Like RET itself, RET's sub-trusts are exempt charities, regulated by the Department for Education.

For its later schools RET used the Multi-Academy Trust model.

The Trust delegates a range of its governance responsibilities to each of its schools' local governing bodies via a formal Scheme of Delegation.
