= Canford Park =

Park in Bristol, England

Coordinates: 51.4934°N 2.6243°W

- Interactive map of Canford Park
- Type: public open space
- Location: Westbury-on-Trym, Bristol, England
- Area: 4.85 acres (1.96 ha)
- Created: 1874
- Operator: Bristol City Council
- Open: All year
- Status: open

Canford Park is a public open park located in the Westbury-on-Trym neighbourhood of Bristol, England. Opened during the Victorian period, it is adjacent to the Canford Cemetery and Crematorium, which opened in 1903. It is run by Bristol City Council.

== History ==
The park in 1919

Canford Park was founded in 1874, on land associated with the nearby Holy Trinity Church, by the Clifton Urban Sanitary Authority as a public recreational space. When Westbury on Trym became a part of Bristol in 1903, the ownership of the park was transferred to the city council. That same year, the Canford Cemetery, adjacent to the park, was founded. A crematorium was added in 1957. In 1912 a bowling green was established and the Canford Bowling Club was founded the following year. The club still uses the green as its home ground.

== Features and recreation ==
Canford Park consists of areas of open grassland, landscaped gardens and formal and informal paths. Its facilities include tennis courts, a bowling green, football pitches and a children's playground. A notable feature of the park is its sunken garden and lily pond, located on the border with the cemetery. The bowling green is used by Canford Bowling Club and the tennis courts form part of the Bristol Parks Tennis network. The park also contains a Grade II listed drinking fountain dating from 1897. The fountain was originally erected in the centre of Westbury-on-Trym to commemorate the Diamond Jubilee of Queen Victoria and was subsequently relocated to Canford Park.
