= Southmead =

Suburb of Bristol, England

Coordinates: 51.5039°N 2.6028°W

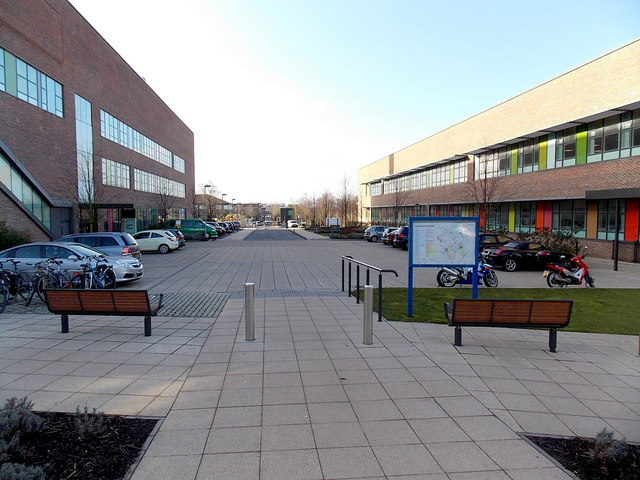
- Pedestrian entrance to Southmead Hospital

- Location within Bristol
- OS grid reference: ST582785
- Unitary authority: Bristol
- Ceremonial county: Bristol
- Region: South West
- Country: England
- Sovereign state: United Kingdom
- Post town: BRISTOL
- Postcode district: BS10
- Dialling code: 0117
- Police: Avon and Somerset
- Fire: Avon
- Ambulance: South Western
- UK Parliament: Bristol North West

Southmead is a northern suburb and council ward of Bristol, in the south west of England, bordered by Filton in South Gloucestershire and Monks Park, Horfield, Henleaze and Westbury on Trym. It is the location of one of Bristol's main hospitals, Southmead Hospital, and to large 20th century council housing estates.

The centre of Southmead is along Greystoke Avenue, a wide road with grassy areas some distance to the north of the original hamlet on Southmead Road. The River Trym rises in Southmead and flows south west through Badock's Wood, a local nature reserve. There is a round barrow near the northern end of the wood, and a Site of Special Scientific Interest, Pen Park Hole.

== Etymology ==
The name Southmead is derived from the Anglo-Saxon words "sūð" (south) and "mǣd" (meadow), old English sūðmǣd (pronounced sooth-mahd), over time this evolved into the modern English name Southmead. The original name was linked to the area being agricultural and farmland which only changed in 1902 when modern development began.

== History ==
Southmead was a manor of the parish of Westbury on Trym. The manor house, mentioned in a document of 1319, was near the south end of what is now Southmead Road. In 1995 a study into archeological records of the area around the former Southmead Manor House uncovered archaeological finds dating from the prehistoric and Romano-British periods and that the area of the "south meadow" had been owned by the Augustinian nunnery of St Mary Magdalen in Bristol. The nunnery had leased the land and the manor to the Haynes family in the early 16th century, during the 19th century the estate was divided into smaller lots. In 1910-12 the house was almost entirely rebuilt - over the years the buying and selling of the house resulted in its gardens being separated from the building and separately developed.

By 1825 a cottage was present on the current site of Southmead hospital, although most of the land was for agricultural use or woodland, in the Victorian period Dr Stanley Baldock developed the Manor Gardens, the ruined late 17th century Gazebo was retained.

Most of the estate of 313 acres (1.27 km^{2}) was sold in the late 19th century, by 1888 Southmead was a small hamlet on Southmead Road.

The Barton Regis Union Workhouse was constructed at the beginning of the 20th century and opened in 1902 by Sir John Dorington, MP for Tewkesbury and Chairman of Gloucestershire County Council - the workhouse consisted of several buildings on site and included an infirmary. These buildings were designed by architects A.P. Cotterell and W.H. Thorp, the infirmary contained with 28 beds for patients and was staffed by three nurses. In 1924 the workhouse became Southmead Infirmary which later changed its name to Southmead Hospital, that year also saw the building of the first Southmead Estate.

=== Slum clearance ===
Until the 1930s Southmead was a largely rural area with farmlands and fields, between 1930 and 1939 the first part of the Southmead Estate was built, these houses were known as "The Lower Portion" or the ‘Old Estate’ and lay to the south of Greystoke Avenue, these houses were built to house residents displaced from slums as a result of the 1930s Housing Act.

Large-scale development of the area started in the 1930s, when Bristol City Council built 1,500 houses to the north of Southmead Road, partly to house families cleared from the slums of central Bristol, and partly to address the housing shortage at the time. A further 1,100 houses were built after the Second World War. Since the Second World War, a reference has often been made by the local community, to the 'pre-war estate' of Southmead and the 'post-war estate', with locals also referring to them as "the old estate" and "the new estate".

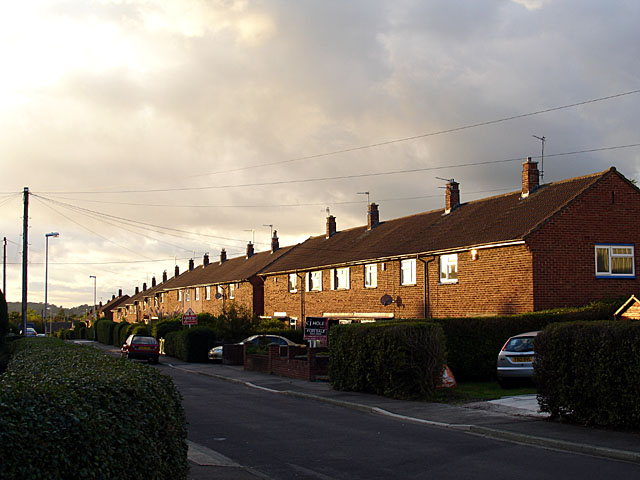
Southmead housing developments

== Demography ==
In 2016 the boundaries of Southmead Ward changed, Charlton Mead LSOA became part of Henbury and Brentry ward, boundary changes being driven by the need to ensure populations between wards are more evenly distributed. According to the 2011 census, Southmead had a total population of 11,956 based on its 2011 ward boundaries but 12,451 based on its current (post-2016) boundaries.

According to the 2021 census figures published by Bristol City Council - Southmead Ward had a total population of 13,193.

Age	Population
0-15	2,762
16-24	1,661
25-34	1,836
35-49	2,841
50-64	2,146
65+	1,947
Total	13,193

According to the Office of National Statistics, Southmead's estimated population in 2022 was 13,300.

=== 2021 census ===
According to the 2021 census Asians were 9.9% of the population compared 9.6% in England overall. Black people were 7.2% compared to 4.2% in England overall. Mixed or multiple ethnic groups were 4.4% compared to 3.0% in England overall. Whites were 76.3% of the population compared to 81.0% in England overall. Other ethnic group were 2.1% compared to 2.2% in England overall.

2021 census figures percentage of overall population
Ethnic group	Southmead	England
Asian	9.9	9.6
Black	7.2	4.2
Mixed	4.4	3.0
White	76.3	81.0
Others	2.1	2.2

According to the 2021 census the religious affiliation of Southmead was as follows:

No religion 43.3% compared to 36.7% in England overall. Christian 39.9% compared to 46.3% in England overall. Buddhist 0.4% compared to 0.5% in England overall. Hindu 1.3% compared to 1.8% in England overall. Jewish 0.0% compared to 0.5% in England overall. Muslim 7.5% compared to 6.7% in England overall. Sikh 0.5% compared to 0.9% in England overall. Other religion 0.5% compared to 0.6% in England overall Not answered 6.6% compared to 6.0% in England overall

2021 census data
Religious affiliation	Southmead	England
None	43.3%	36.7%
Christian	39.9%	46.3%
Buddhist	0.4%	0.5%
Hindu	1.3%	1.8%
Jewish	0.0%	0.5%
Muslim	7.5%	6.7%
Sikh	0.5%	0.9%
Other religion	0.5%	0.6%
Not answered	6.6%	6.0%

== Social issues ==
Efforts have been made to improve the area's social problems and implement environmental improvements, many of which have been successful. Social policies have led to a more mixed housing offer and to some gentrification, with improved infrastructure and local services. The right to buy has led to an increased transfer of housing provision from tenanted to owner-occupation. Major employment hubs at Filton, MOD Abbey Wood and the increase of services at Southmead Hospital have brought increased affluence and opportunity to the area. A greater selection of shops and facilities have come to the area, allowing those on limited incomes to access food more cheaply and readily. Whilst Southmead as an area looks and feels as though it is improving, it still experiences some deprivation. The central part of Southmead still sits within the most 10% deprived areas of England, and the south west of the ward since 2015 now falls within the bottom 10-20% most deprived areas. Ongoing social policies and economic impacts are taking time to incrementally improve the area.

Residents have good geographical access to services. Despite there having been some transfer of public services away from physical resources to more central, virtual and internet based services; there is still a small police facility at the hospital and a fire station on Southmead Road. Bus services, whilst sometimes locally critiqued, are accessible and more frequent as compared to some other areas of the City. A frequent service connects residents to the Gloucester Road area, City Centre and Cribbs Causeway for shopping. The nearest station is 2–3 miles (3–5 km) away at Filton Abbey Wood.

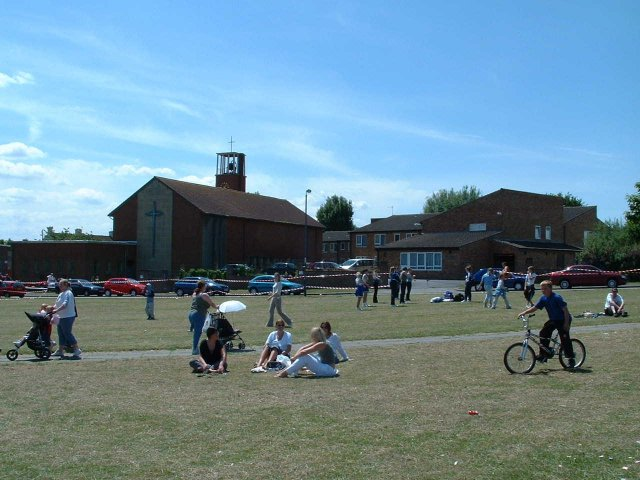
Glencoyne Square

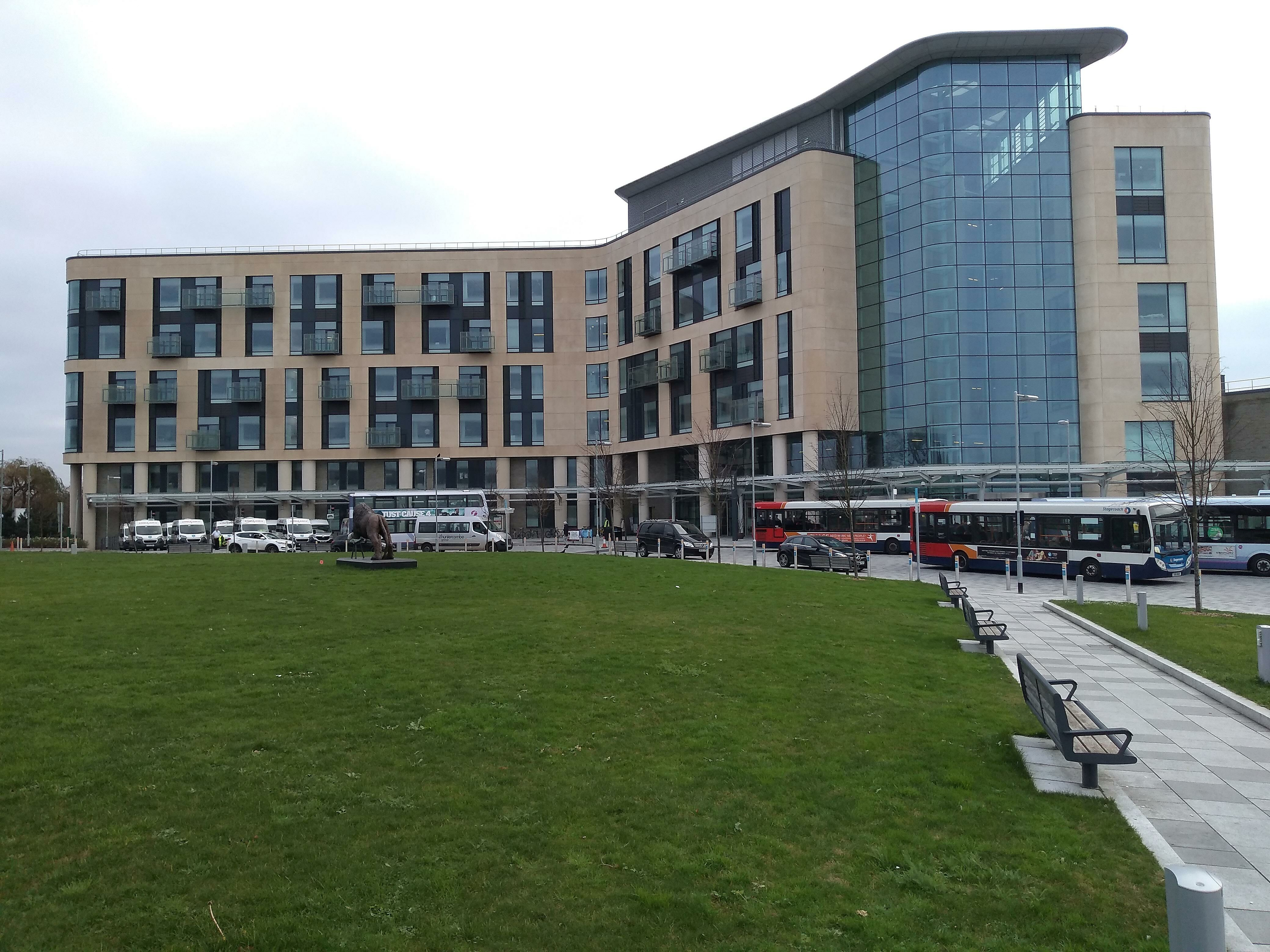
Southmead Hospital

There is provision of health services with a doctor's surgery on Ullswater Road and at the art-deco style Greenway Centre. A regional hospital, and A&E facility can be found at Southmead Hospital. The Lannercost provides facilities for those with physical and learning impairments. There are a selection of care homes and sheltered accommodation about the ward area. Despite access to health facilities Southmead still has poor health outcomes, with life expectancy at 77 years, five years lower than neighbouring Henleaze, although it is higher than other areas in Bristol, such as Bedminster at 76.4 years.

The area is well served with a range of local parks and sporting facilities. There is a private members' sports club at David Lloyd near Badock's Wood. There are sports pitches and a gym at Greenway Centre to the south east, and pitches at Charlton Mead to the east. Filton Golf Course abuts Southmead to the north east. There is an MUGA and Adventure Playground off Doncaster Road. There are also play areas off of Glencoyne Square, Charlton Mead and Greystoke Avenue. A mile to the south of Southmead is Horfield Sports Centre with public access to 3G pitches, gym, sports Hall and a swimming pool. Blaise Castle, Coombe Dingle and Kingsweston House offer good green open space only a few miles away.

There is ready access to children's provision through a selection of primary schools at Badocks Wood, Little Mead and Fonthill. Badocks Wood Children Centre complements Early Year's provision to the south of the area.

== Social cohesion ==
Southmead has historically had adverse press due to community safety. As with any area there have been mixed experiences by residents and visitors. The area is said by locals to be "a great place [with] ... a strong sense of community spirit, lots of community activity and lots of optimism for the future." The local neighbourhood plan says "our vision is that Southmead is known as a great place for everyone to live, a strong community where residents work together, inspire each other and people of all ages have the skills and confidence to achieve their full potential". This plan was the outcome of significant community consultation and planning. Two of the nine strands of the community plan target community safety and strengthening the community (including inclusion and cohesion). The Southmead Development Trust (SDT) co-ordinates and oversees the plan.

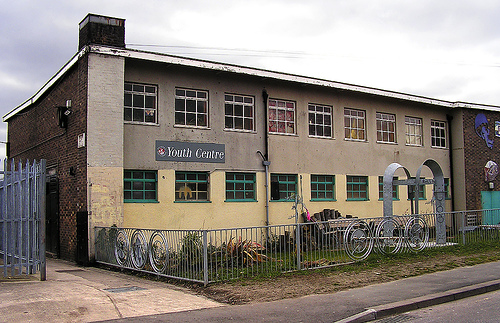
Southmead Youth Centre

On 19 October 2009, a report on the BBC programme Panorama called "Undercover - Hate on the Doorstep" aired. This investigated the extent of racism in modern Britain. Two undercover British Asian reporters, pretending to be a young married couple, moved into the Southmead estate. Here, for two months, the two journalists were subjected to fifty incidents of racist abuse by residents of the area: the couple were not only verbally but also physically attacked during their stay and were repeatedly told to return to Iraq. The public was shocked not only by the use of the term "Jew" as an insult, but also by the fact that the couple were pelted with shards of glass and stones, threatened with a brick during an attempted robbery by an eleven-year-old and punched on the head. The day after the programme aired, a 22-year-old man and the 11-year-old boy who committed the robbery were arrested on charges of racially aggravated assault.

== Electoral ward ==
Southmead
- ward Bristol City Council
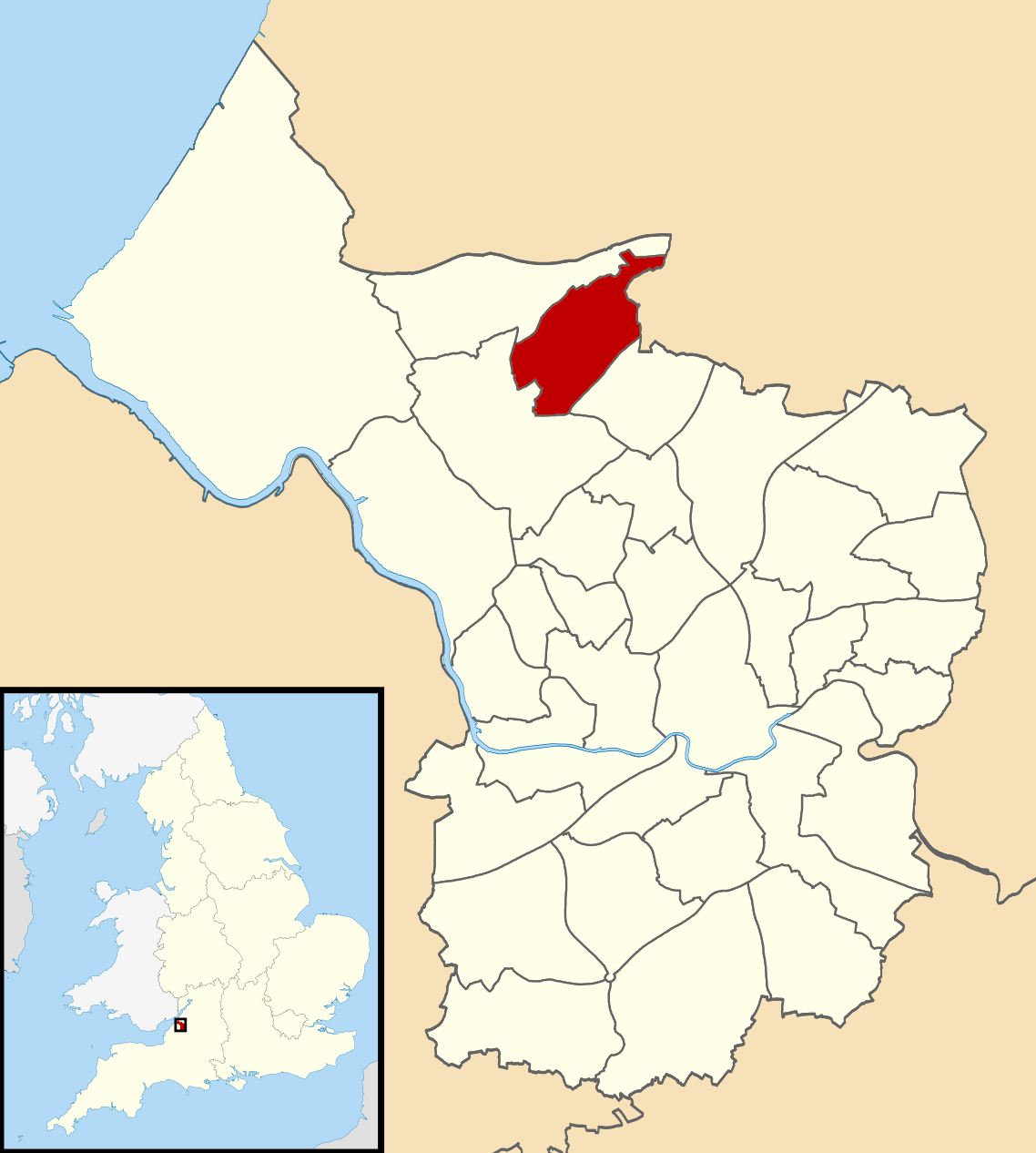
- Ward boundaries since 2016.
- County: Bristol
- Population: 13,193
- Electorate: 9,181

Current ward
- Councillor: Kye Dudd (Labour)
- Councillor: Kaz Self (Labour)
- UK Parliament constituency: Bristol North West

Southmead elects two members to Bristol City Council, which as of 2024 are Kye Dudd and Kaz Self, both members of the Labour Party.

Southmead ward was created in 1974, originally electing 3 members to Bristol City Council and one member to Avon County Council. Following a 1998 boundary review, it elected 2 members to Bristol City Council. Following another boundary review in 2015, the south and west of the Southmead neighbourhood falls within Westbury-on-Trym and Henleaze ward, while parts of the neighbourhood to the southeast of Southmead Road, including the hospital, are in Horfield ward.

Councillors representing Southmead ward since 2016
Elected	Councillor	Party	Electorate	Turnout
2024	Kye Dudd	Labour	9,181	26%
2024	Kaz Self	Labour	9,181	26%
2021	Helen Godwin	Labour	9,091	31.28%
2021	Brenda Massey	Labour	9,091	31.28%
2016	Brenda Massey	Labour	8,693	35.53%
2016	Helen Godwin	Labour	8,693	35.53%
