= Blaise High School =

Location
- Station Road; Henbury, Bristol, BS10 7QH; England; 51.5096°N 2.6319°W

Information
- Former name: Henbury School
- Type: Academy
- Motto: Work hard, Be kind
- Established: 1956
- Local authority: Bristol City Council
- Trust: Greenshaw Learning Trust
- Department for Education URN: 147219 Tables
- Ofsted: Reports
- Head teacher: Nat Nabarro
- Gender: Mixed
- Age range: 11–18
- Enrolment: 772 (2020)
- Capacity: 990
- Colours: Green and black
- Website: www.blaisehighschool.co.uk

Blaise High School (formerly Henbury School) is an 11–18 mixed, secondary school and sixth form with academy status in Henbury, Bristol, England. It was formerly a community school that was established in 1956 and converted to an academy in June 2012. It adopted its present name in September 2019 and is part of the Greenshaw Learning Trust.

== History ==
Logo of Henbury School.

Henbury School was a community school that was established in 1956 as one of the first purpose-built comprehensive schools in the country. It was completely rebuilt under a £17.3 million private finance initiative in 2005 where a financial agreement was made in April 2004 between Bristol City Council and Bristol Schools Ltd; a company set up by HBG Construction Ltd to oversee the construction and management of the school for 26 years, including three other schools that were also being rebuilt, after which it will become the property of the local education authority. The features of the new building include a sports hall, all-weather pitch, swimming pool, fitness suite, dance studio and coffee bar.

It was used as a filming location for the Roundview College in the television series Skins and its American-style yellow school bus service was discontinued by Bristol City Council after December 2005 following a two-year pilot, due to it not being cost effective and students were already using sustainable transport. The service was launched in June 2003 as a joint initiative between the council and FirstGroup with an aim to reduce traffic congestion and improve child safety.

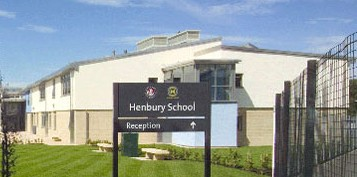
Image of the rebuilt Henbury School.

It has been involved in the Rugby Football Union's All Schools programme since 2012 and is linked with Clifton Rugby Football Club. England announced their 2019 Rugby World Cup squad at the school on 12 August 2019, and its students who were involved in rugby programmes and Clifton took part in rugby sessions with the players and coaches. It converted to an academy in June 2012.

It was rated 'inadequate' by Ofsted following its inspection in November 2018 and the governing body subsequently began looking into the future of the school and evaluating its options. It agreed unanimously that it believed the best way forward was to join the Greenshaw Learning Trust and was confirmed in March 2019 following consultation with parents and other stakeholders. The trust had also been providing support to the school since the start of the year and Katherine Brown was appointed as the new headteacher from September 2019.

It joined the trust and renamed to Blaise High School in September 2019 with a new logo and uniform as part of its "journey of improvement to ensure it provides the best possible learning environment for all of its students". The name was selected after receiving the highest number of preferences in a survey and reflects its place in the local community with it being close to the Blaise Castle Estate. The new logo retains the school colours of green and black with a castle design representing Blaise Castle on a traditional heraldic badge shape. The new uniform was devised in discussion with the school community and subsidised by the trust.

== Notable alumni ==
Henbury School

- Alice Evans, actress
- Rob Hopkins, environmental activist and writer
- Robin Cousins, figure skater
- Simon King, naturalist, author, conservationist, television presenter and cameraman

== Notable staff ==
Henbury School

- Geoff Gollop, former school governor
