= Perrett's Park =

Park in South Bristol

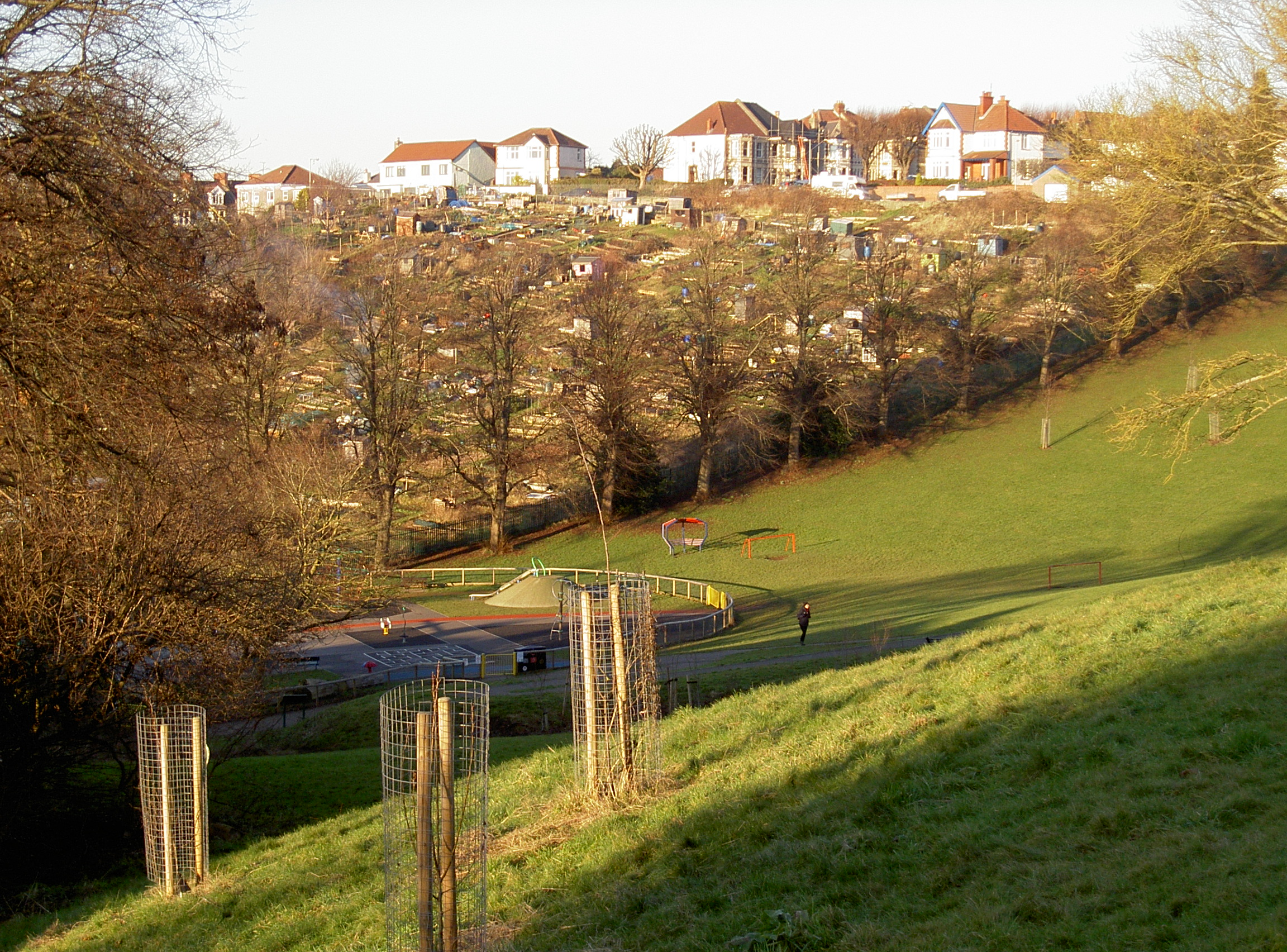

- Location within Bristol
- Type: Public Park
- Location: Knowle, Bristol, England
- OS grid: ST600713
- Coordinates: 51°26′16″N 2°34′37″W
- Area: 16.4 acres (6.6 ha)
- Established: 1925
- Operator: Bristol City Council
- Status: Open Year Round

Perrett's Park is a park and open space near Knowle, Bristol. The park marks part of the boundary between the Windmill Hill and Knowle wards of the city.

In 2013, the park was recognised as one of Bristol's "most picturesque parks" with a plaque highlighting the view, paid for by the Community of Perrett's Park (COPP).

The park was rated 'Outstanding' in 2015, by the annual 'South-West In Bloom' competition.

The facilities include a paved walkway, benches and a children's play area.

== History ==
In the spring of 1923, Charles Rose Perrett, the local councillor for whom the park is named, managed to obtain an option on 10 acres at Bayham Road and Sylvia Avenue, two thirds of which was under cultivation as allotments.

The land was purchased from Lady Smyth of Ashton Court for £1,000 in 1923, £500 of which was donated by Perrett, who stated that 18,000 people would be served by the park as a place of recreation.

Bristol City Council considered the proposal, and the cost was calculated at £5,035 for the land, layout, fencing and the cost of the abutting road. The land was formally acquired in November 1923. In April 1925, the final total was said to be £5,100. By 1925 the park was open adopting the name 'Perrett's Park' later in 1927.

The park unveiled a new fountain on April 12, 1930, to celebrate Charles Rose Perrett's 88th Birthday, in one of his last public appearances.

However, the fountain was lost at an unknown point, to be later tracked down to the Ashton Court Estate in 2011, at least thirty years after its disappearance, by local campaigner, James Stafford Little.

The fountain was recovered, with money raised for its restoration through a community event in August 2011 raising £900, and a Council grant of £1000 in 2012. Since then, the marble basin and its base unexpectedly returned to the park in August 2016, and was taken into council storage, before returning to the park under the ownership of the Community of Perrett's Park (COPP). The fountain instead become a bird bath, located at the top of the park, as the brass cups and ornate centrepiece were missing.

During the Second World War the park hosted one of Bristol's first above-ground air-raid shelters and later was the location of a barrage balloon, the heavy metal rings of which remain in the park.

== Allotments ==
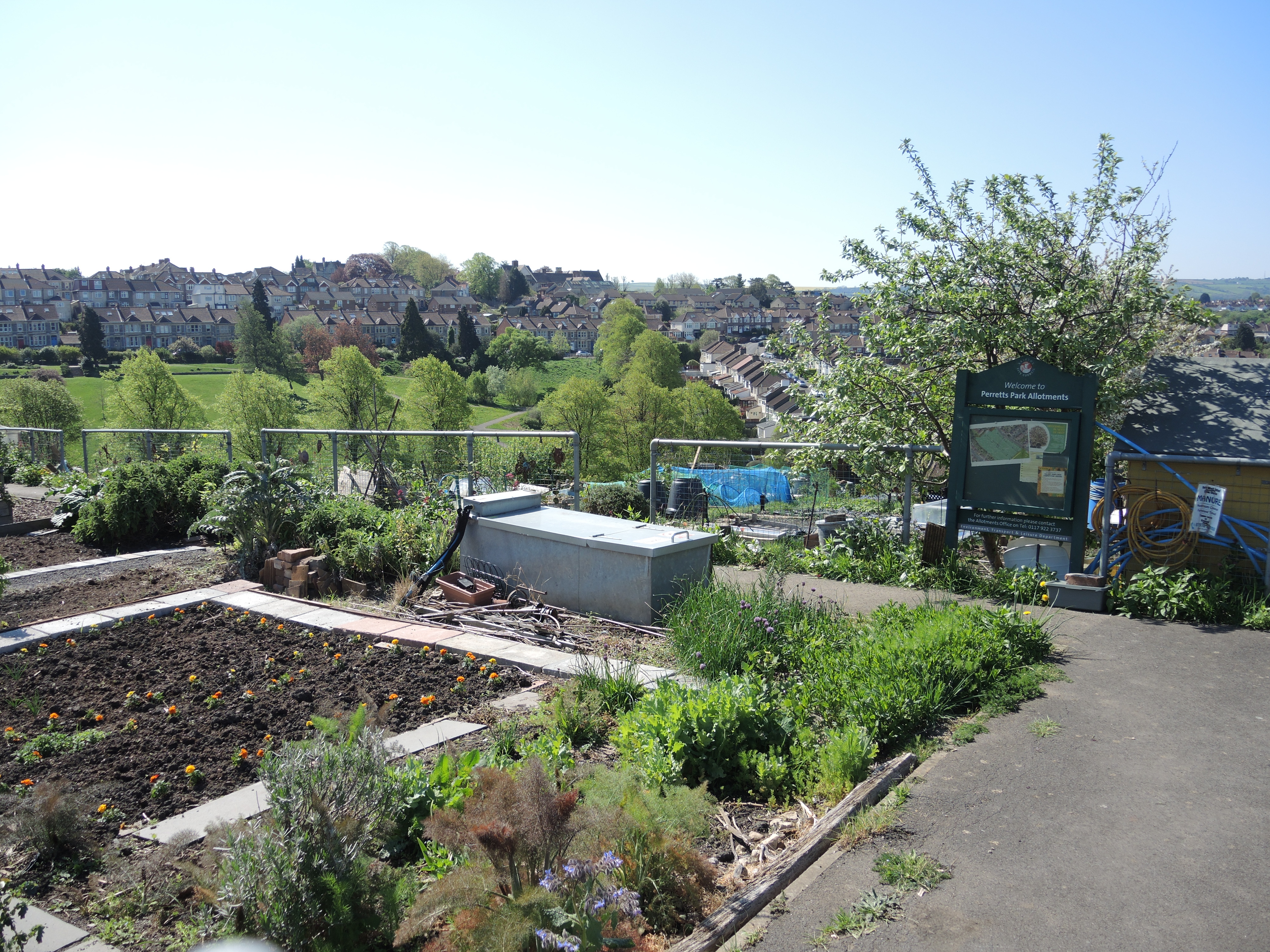
Perrett's Park Allotments in 2022

The Perrett's Park Allotments existed before the park's creation, and now have 112 plots. They are accessible via Bayham Road or Knowle Road and have facilities including a water tap and water trough. They are managed by Bristol City Council.

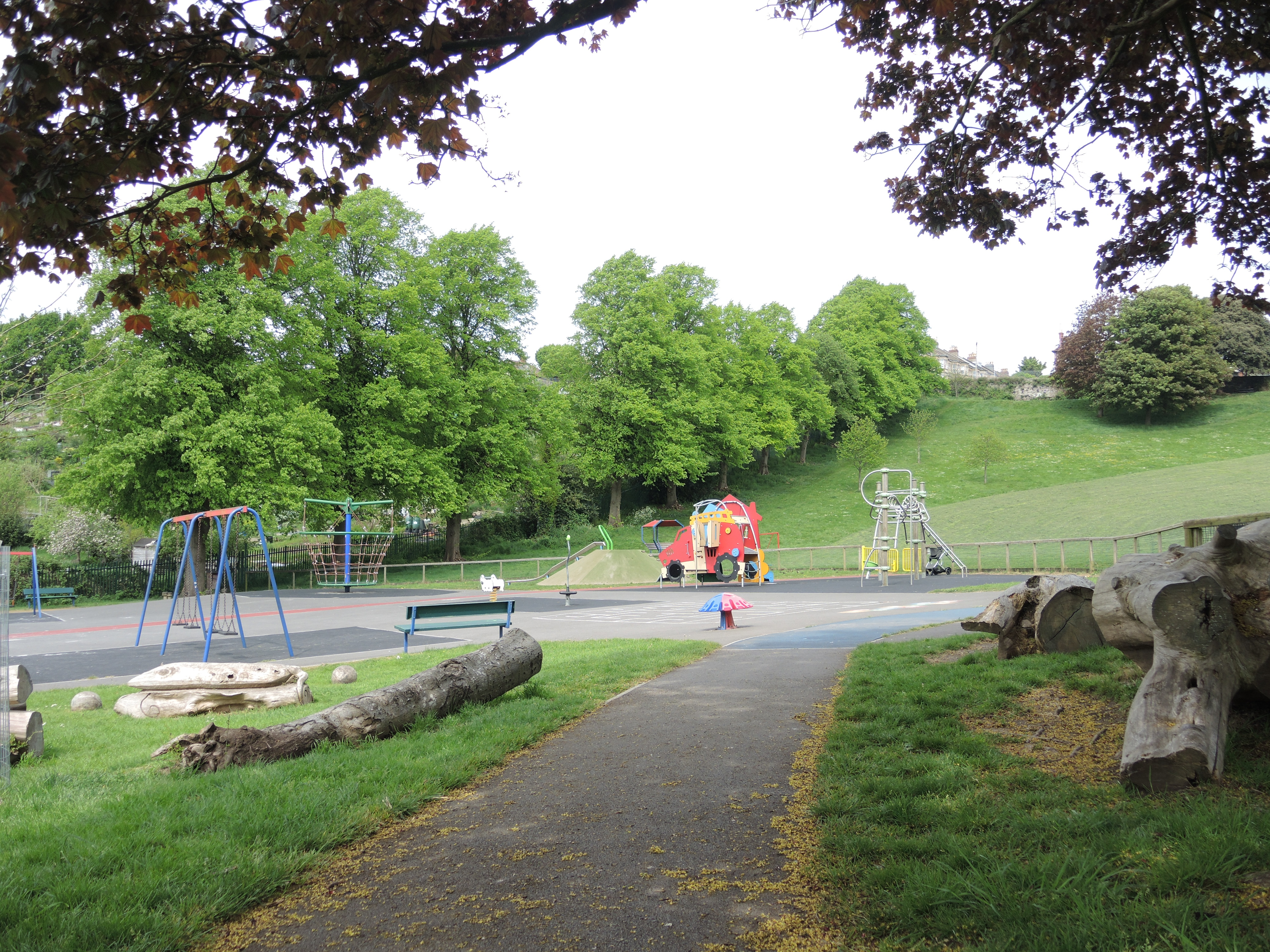
The Play Area, after refurbishment in 2015.

== Geology ==
Perrett's park sits on a base of Mercia Mudstone Group sedimentary bedrock, specifically mudstone and halite-stone. This formed between 252.2 and 201.3 million years ago, during the Triassic period. The geology changes in the north-east section of the allotments to Blue Anchor formation mudstone, Westbury and Cotham member mudstone and limestone, and Langport member limestone as a result of the Lillymead Avenue section of Wilmcote Limestone, formed between 209.5 and 199.3 million years ago, during the Triassic and Jurassic periods.

== Events ==
A number of annual events take place in Perrett's Park. As a natural amphitheatre, the park offers panoramic views, and an excellent vantage point to watch the Bristol International Balloon Fiesta's mass ascent every August.

The Community of Perrett's Park (COPP) also hosts an annual picnic in order to raise funds for the park's maintenance and projects. The event raised over £370 in 2015, to pay for tree planting and new benches, and over £600 in 2019.

Other notable events throughout the year include Easter Egg rolling, and carolling, which is often hosted by local churches in the park near to Christmas-time, in collaboration with the COPP.

== In popular culture ==
The park was used as a filming location for scenes of medical drama series Holby City, as well as the British supernatural comedy-drama television series Being Human.

In 2021 the park was the host of a soapbox race as a part of a YouTube Originals episode by popular YouTubers Chunkz and Maya Jama called 'Hometown Showdown'. Jama is from Bristol, and Perrett's park was used as a representation of the city. The event was watched by members of the local community and the video gained over 1.5 million views online.
