= St Thomas of Canterbury Church of England Aided Primary School =

Location
- Sawyers Hall Lane; Brentwood, Essex, CM15 9BX; England
- Coordinates: 51.62712°N 0.30429°E

Information
- Type: Voluntary aided school
- Established: 1835; 191 years ago
- Local authority: Essex County Council
- Department for Education URN: 115179 Tables
- Ofsted: Reports
- Headteacher: Dean Moran
- Gender: Coeducational
- Age: 4 to 11
- Enrolment: 302 as of November 2023
- Website: www.stthomaspri.org

St Thomas of Canterbury Church of England Aided Primary School is a primary school located in Brentwood, Essex in England.

== History ==
The school was founded in 1835 (although some argue that it was founded as a Penny School in 1715 and there are records of such a school in Brentwood). The school is now sited in Sawyers Hall Lane, Brentwood. The school moved to Sawyers Hall Lane in 1967 and was opened by the Duchess of Kent - Princess Margaret- in 1968. The 40th Anniversary was celebrated in 2008.

== Walking bus ==
The school has the largest walking bus in Essex.
