= Monks Park =

Suburb of Bristol, England

Coordinates: 51.49841°N 2.58918°W

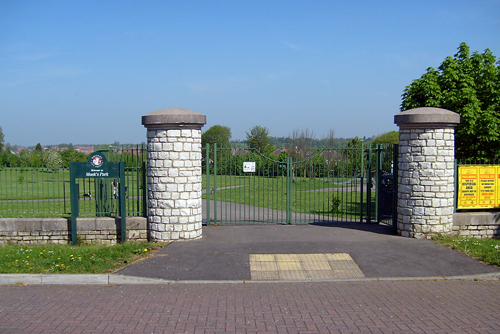
Monks Park

Monks Park is a northern suburb of the city of Bristol, England. Monks Park stretches westward, towards Southmead, from the A38 trunk road. Filton Park lies directly north, on the South Gloucestershire side of the city boundary. Horfield lies to the east of the A38 and also to the south.

Monks Park takes its name from James Henry Monk, a nineteenth-century bishop of Gloucester and Bristol. The first development in Monks Park took place in the 1930s. Housing is mainly privately owned and semi-detached. Southmead Hospital, Bristol's largest hospital, occupies the south west corner of the suburb. There are two primary schools (Upper Horfield and St Teresa's RC) and Orchard School Bristol, formerly known as Monks Park School prior to 2009.
