= Henleaze =

Suburb of Bristol, England

Coordinates: 51.4900°N 2.5989°W

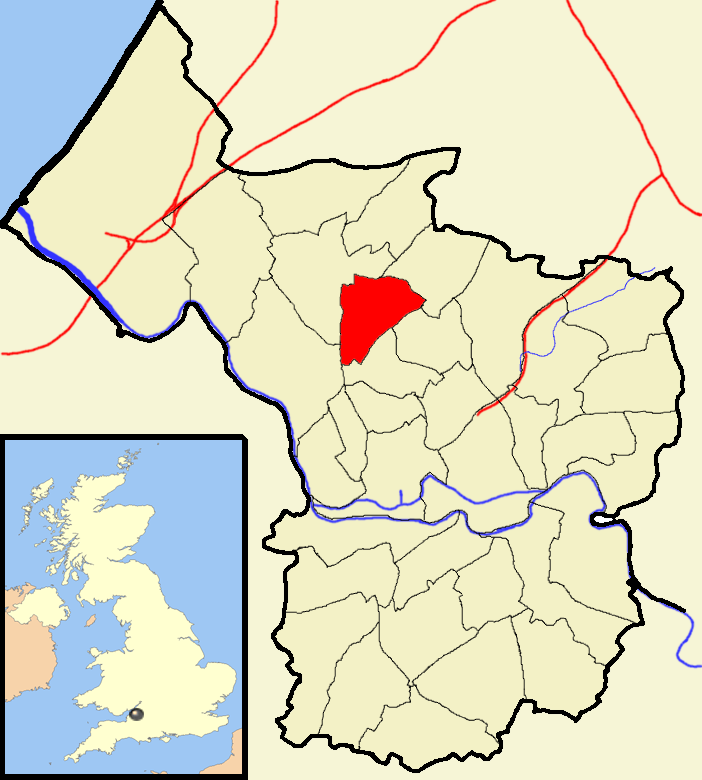
- Boundaries of the former city council ward.
- Population: 10,402 (2011.Ward)
- OS grid reference: ST585769
- Unitary authority: Bristol
- Ceremonial county: Bristol
- Region: South West
- Country: England
- Sovereign state: United Kingdom
- Post town: BRISTOL
- Postcode district: BS9
- Dialling code: 0117
- Police: Avon and Somerset
- Fire: Avon
- Ambulance: South Western
- UK Parliament: Bristol North West

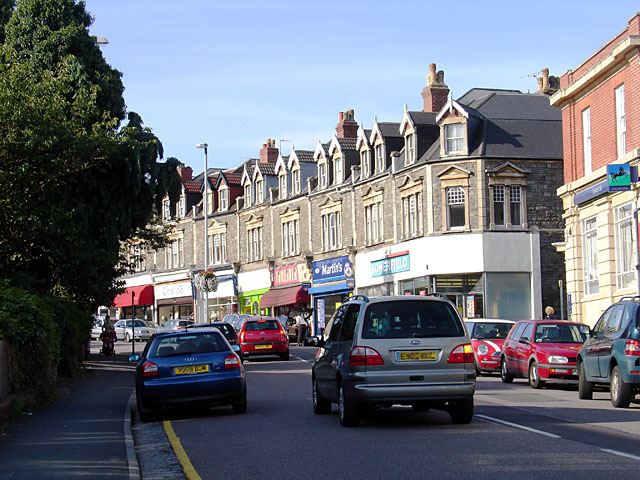
Shops in Henleaze

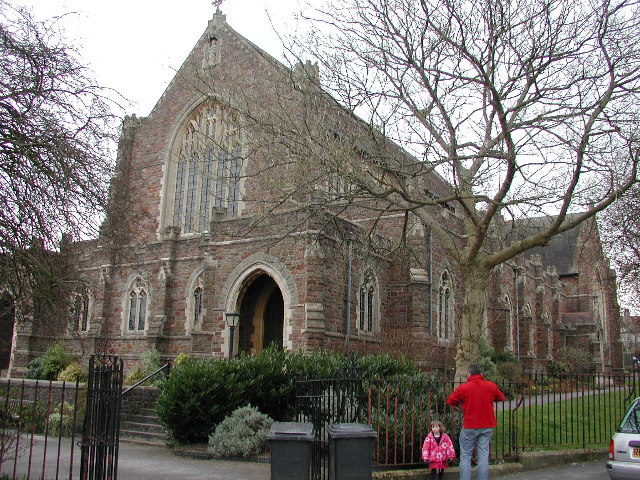
St Peter's parish church

Henleaze is a suburb in the north of the city of Bristol in South West England. It is an almost entirely residential interwar development, with Edwardian streets on its southern fringes. Its main neighbours are Westbury on Trym, Horfield, Bishopston and Redland.

== History ==
The name of Henleaze probably derives from a Robert Henley, who in 1659 bought a property which became known as Henley's House and later as Henleaze Park. The area was a rural part of the parish of Westbury on Trym until 1896, when land between Henleaze Road and Durdham Down was sold for development. Most of the rest of the area was developed in the 1920s, during the British interwar housing boom.

== Politics ==
For elections to the Parliament of the United Kingdom, Henleaze is in the Bristol North West constituency. As of 2024, the MP is Darren Jones of the Labour.

For elections to Bristol City Council, Henleaze is part of the Westbury-on-Trym and Henleaze electoral ward, which as of 2024 is represented by three Liberal Democrats. Until 2016, Henleaze and Westbury-on-Trym were two separate electoral wards.

=== Former council ward ===
Henleaze ward also included Golden Hill and Westbury Park.

Up until the early 1990s, Henleaze was a solid Conservative area, however The Liberal Democrats established a more solid position up until 2006, when it began to swing back to the Conservatives. In the 2009 elections, when the Liberal Democrats took control of the City Council, Liz Radford a local campaigner achieved an unprecedented swing in the ward for the Conservatives. Henleaze would have fallen to them if the swing had been just 1.5% higher.

Henleaze is one of the most affluent areas of the city. Among the thirty-five wards into which Bristol was divided, it had the fifth lowest proportion of people in routine and semi-routine occupations, according to the 2001 census, and the fifth highest proportion with higher education qualifications.

The ward was merged with neighbouring Westbury-on-Trym ward following a 2015 Local Government Boundary Commission for England review, which found that the electorate size for the two neighbourhoods merited three councillors between them. Initial proposals were to keep Westbury-on-Trym as one single-member ward and Henleaze as two-member ward, while transferring part of the former into the latter, but this was rejected because it would have placed the boundary through the traditional village centre of Westbury-on-Trym.

== Amenities ==
Henleaze Lake, a flooded former quarry on the northern edge of Henleaze near Southmead and Westbury on Trym, is owned by a charity, Henleaze Swimming Club, since 2009 and celebrated its Centenary in 2019.

Another former quarry was filled in and made into a park, now known as Old Quarry Park. It was recently renovated with the help of a grant from the National Lottery for the provision of play equipment, seating and flower beds.

Henleaze also features newsagents, bakeries, supermarkets and charity shops, as well as a library, the Orpheus cinema which is run by 'King' Harold and Scott Cinemas and the Den (Est 2007). Henleaze Old Boys Cricket Club was formed in 2005 and play at the neighbouring Golden Hill Cricket ground. The membership of the club is primarily former Henleaze Junior School pupils. There is also a thriving Tennis Club based in Tennessee Grove with 4 outdoor courts and planning permission for floodlighting one has recently been granted.

The Henleaze Society is a local charitable amenity group, whose activities include a newsletter, monitoring planning applications and developments in transport and traffic, campaigning for and contributing to Bristol City Council's neighbourhood character appraisal of Henleaze and purchasing and maintaining a public defibrillator. In 1997 they named a small alley "Dogsmess Alley" in an attempt to highlight a fouling problem there.

== Churches ==
Henleaze parish church, St Peter's, was designed and built in 1926 by A. V. Gough. Trinity-Henleaze United Reformed Church was built in 1907 (as Henleaze Congregational Church) and designed by Frank Wills, who designed many Bristol churches.

== Listed buildings and structures ==
- St Ursula's High School in Brecon Road dates from the mid 19th century and is grade II listed.
- Greystone House, at 12 The Drive, is grade II listed.
- The Old Lodge built circa 1810 is grade II listed.
- South of 14 Eastfield, a mid-19th century local hand pump is grade II listed. It is made of cast iron with a round shaft and a long curved handle with a ball end.
- 20 Eastfield is grade II listed.
- 10 Eastfield is grade II listed.
