= Proposed transport developments in Bristol =

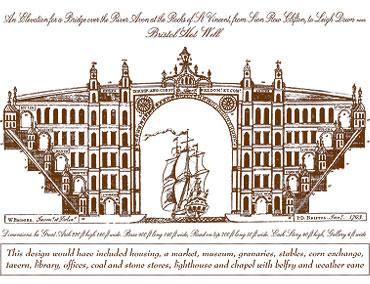
William Bridges' proposed design for Clifton Suspension Bridge

This article lists proposed developments to transport in Bristol, England.

== MetroBus ==
In 2018, expansion of Bristol's MetroBus network was under consideration by the West of England Combined Authority.

== Bristol Airport expansion ==
Plans to increase the airport's capacity from 10 million passengers per year to 12 million were refused permission by North Somerset Council in 2020, among criticism of effects of the proposals on the environment.

== MetroWest ==
The MetroWest scheme, previously known as The Greater Bristol Metro, is a proposal to improve the rail services in Greater Bristol. It was first proposed at First Great Western's Stakeholder Event in March 2008, and received political backing in 2012. The scheme includes the reopening of the Portishead Line, and increasing train frequency on the Severn Beach Line as part of phase 1; and the reopening of the Henbury line and increasing train services to Yate in phase 2.

== Light rail or rapid transit ==
The Bristol and Bath Railway Path is proposed to have a light rail line running alongside the pedestrian and cycling paths

In November 2016, the West of England Local Enterprise Partnership began a consultation process on their Transport Vision Summary Document, outlining potential light rail/tram routes from the city centre to Bristol Airport, the eastern and north west fringes of the city, and a route along the A4 road to Bath.

In July 2017, a leaked draft of that document, due to be published in October 2017, suggested an underground rail network around the most built-up areas of the city as one of many solutions to congestion equating to £8.9 billion. In September 2017, incumbent mayor, Marvin Rees vocally supported the creation of an underground line in the city. The service would run from Bristol Airport to Temple Meads, the centre and north of Bristol and then to Cribbs Causeway, and would cost an estimated at £2.5bn. The city council commissioned a £50,000 study to determine the financial viability of the project and Rees has suggested £3 million for a geological survey.

As of 2019, four mass transit lines are proposed (with technology type and exact routes to be determined):

- Bristol to Airport – connecting the city centre, South Bristol, and the Airport.
- Bristol to North Fringe – connecting the city centre, North Bristol, Southmead Hospital, Cribbs Causeway.
- Bristol to East Fringe – connecting the city centre, East Fringe and East Bristol.

== M4 junction at Emersons Green ==
It has been long proposed for there to be a motorway junction linking the A4174 Avon ring road to the M4 motorway near to Emersons Green as they pass very close. In 2010, this attracted support from the Kingswood MP.

== Great Western Main Line electrification ==
The first plans to electrify the Great Western line, announced in 2009, included the route to Temple Meads via Chippenham as well as the connecting line between Temple Meads and the South Wales Main Line at Bristol Parkway. Electrification of the South Wales line as far as Cardiff was completed in 2019, but in 2016 the government indefinitely delayed work on the Chippenham route and the Parkway connecting line.

== South Bristol ring road ==
There have been several proposals to extend the ring road from the junction with the A4 at Hicks Gate, Keynsham, along the southern edge of Bristol as far as the A370 at Long Ashton.

The 2005 Greater Bristol Strategic Transport Study, commissioned by the regional government office, recommended construction of the new southern route to tackle congestion. The proposals follow the route set aside west from Hengrove Park roundabout to the A38 at Castle Farm (phase 1), and from there to the A370 near Long Ashton Park and Ride (phase 2). There are additional recommendations (phase 3) for a new Whitchurch bypass from Hengrove Park roundabout, along the base of Dundry Hill, around Stockwood and joining the A4174 at Hicks Gate roundabout on the A4. Phase one and two of the ring road are the only major road building schemes adopted by the Joint Local Transport Plan, which claimed they would reduce delays across the Greater Bristol area by 6%, and lead to a 9% increase in public transport use. Bristol City Council has endorsed all three phases, and was hoping to begin construction of the first two phases in 2010 and 2011, and the third phase some time after 2016. However, the plan had not been approved by the Department for Transport.

In January 2015, the Department for Transport approved plans for the construction of the South Bristol Link road, as part of the MetroBus rapid transit scheme. Construction began in late 2015 and was completed in early 2017.

== See also ==
- Transport in Bristol
