= Transport in Bristol =

Bristol is a city in south west England, near the Bristol Channel coast, approximately 106 miles (170 km) west of London. Several factors have influenced the development of its transport network. It is a major centre of employment, retail, culture and higher education, has many historic areas, and has a history of maritime industry. The city has a population of 450,000, with a metropolitan area of 650,000, and lies at the centre of the former County of Avon, which includes many dormitory towns, and has a population of one million.

The West of England Combined Authority (WECA) has substantial responsibility for transport policy in its area which covers Bristol and surrounding areas. During 2023 residual strategic transport planning responsibility will be transferred to WECA from its constituent councils.

== National and international connections ==
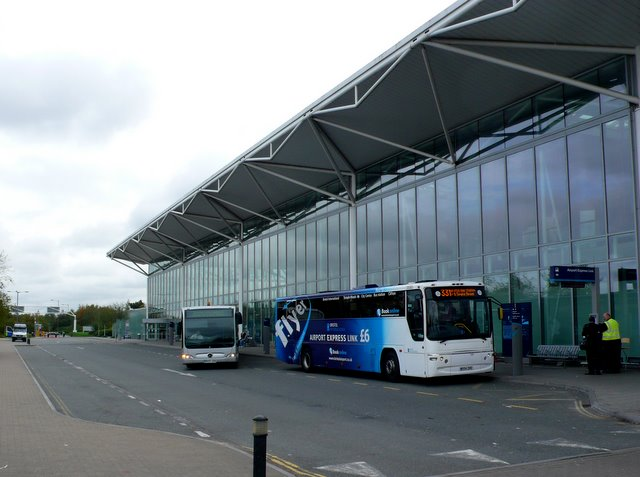
The passenger terminal at Bristol Airport, Lulsgate

The city is connected by road on an east-west axis from London to Wales by the M4 motorway, and on a north-southwest axis from Birmingham to Exeter by the M5 motorway. Also within the authority area is the M49 motorway, a shortcut between the M5 in the south and M4 Severn Crossing in the west.

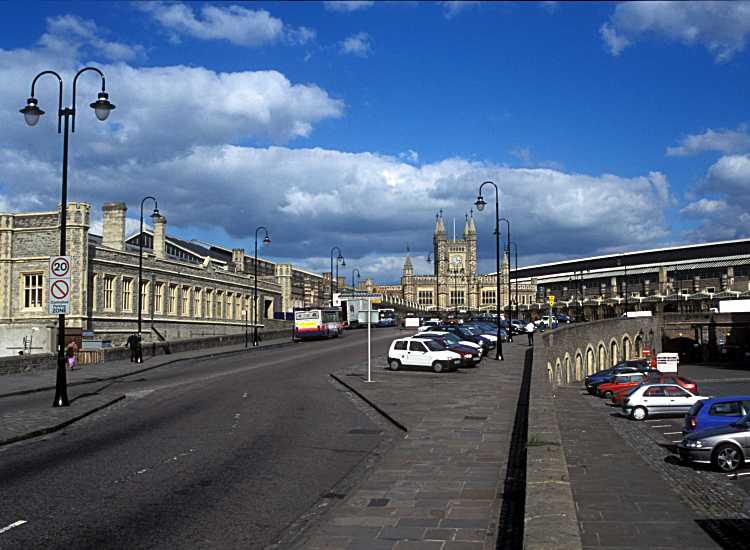
Temple Meads station

There are two principal railway stations in Bristol – Bristol Parkway and Bristol Temple Meads – and 11 suburban stations. There are scheduled coach links to most major UK cities.

Bristol Airport (BRS), about 8 miles (13 km) south-west of the city centre, has services to major European destinations.

== Public transport ==
=== Rail ===
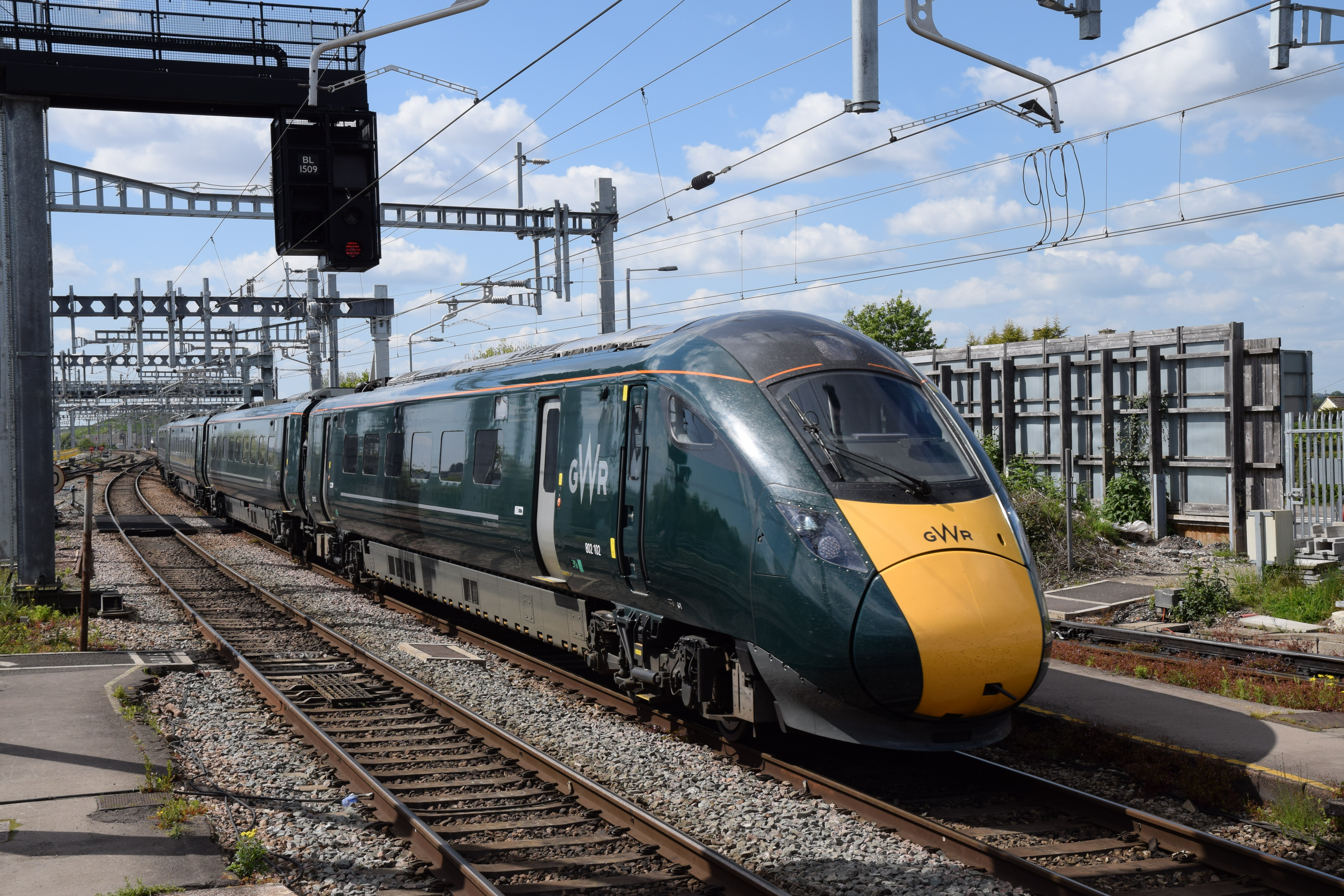
Electrified track at Bristol Parkway

Bristol has never been well served by suburban railways, though the Severn Beach Line to Avonmouth and Severn Beach survived the Beeching Axe and is still in operation today. Usage of the line has more than doubled since the early 2000s, but still only a small percentage of Bristol residents use rail for commuting.

High frequency commuter services operate between Bristol and Bath, serving the intermediate stations of Keynsham and Oldfield Park. There is potential to reopen another intermediate station, St Anne's Park, which was closed in 1970.

Long distance services run from Bristol Temple Meads in the centre and Bristol Parkway in the north, where the line was electrified in 2018.

==== Improvement plans ====
The Filton Bank from central to north Bristol was returned to quadruple track in 2018 to allow for improvements to local and long distance services. Ashley Hill railway station reopened as Ashley Down in 2024.

Work began in 2022 on Portway Park and Ride railway station on the Severn Beach line, serving the existing Portway park & ride site, west of the city and close to the M5 motorway. It opened in August 2023.

The Portishead Railway was closed in the Beeching Axe but was relaid between 2000 and 2002 as far as the Royal Portbury Dock with a Strategic Rail Authority rail-freight grant. Plans to reinstate a further three miles of track to Portishead, a dormitory town with only one connecting road, are underway, with services to be initially one train per hour.

There are also plans to reopen parts of the Henbury Loop Line to passengers, including Bristol Brabazon station at a new housing development with connections to the future Bristol Arena.

=== Buses ===
Public transport within the city is still largely bus-based, with majority of local bus services operated by First West of England. Bristol bus station is in Marlborough Street, near the Broadmead shopping area and serves coaches and longer distance buses, whilst most local buses run to or through the Centre, where trams used to run.

==== metrobus ====
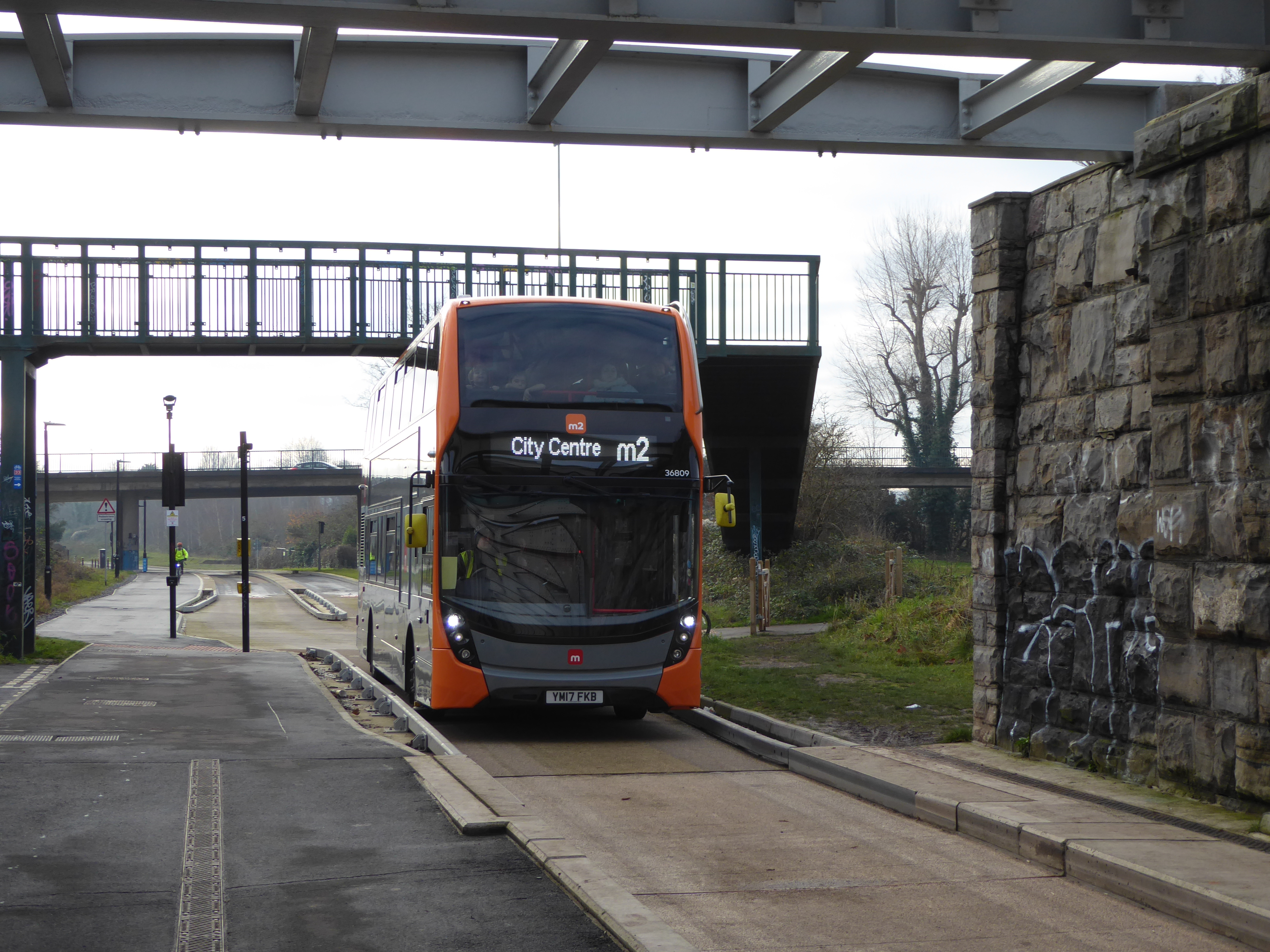
The m2 metrobus route has a guided busway section

metrobus is a bus rapid transit system with four all-day service routes and one peak service route.

- m1: Cribbs Causeway to Hengrove Park via the University of the West of England Frenchay campus, the city centre and Bedminster, all-day service
- m2: Long Ashton park & ride to the city centre via the Bristol Guided Busway, all-day service
- m3: Emersons Green and Lyde Green park & ride to The Centre, via Hambrook and the University of the West of England Frenchay campus
- m3x: Emersons Green and Lyde Green park & ride express via M32 motorway to The Centre, via Hambrook only, peak service
- m4: Cribbs Causeway to The Centre via Bristol Parkway Station and the University of the West of England, all-day service

=== Water transport ===
Two companies, Bristol Ferry Boats and Number Seven Boat Trips, operate scheduled passenger ferry boat services in Bristol Harbour in the centre of Bristol. The services run the length of the harbour from Hotwells to Bristol Temple Meads railway station via SS Great Britain and The Centre, serving 15 landing stages. They are used for both commuting and leisure purposes.

== Local road network ==
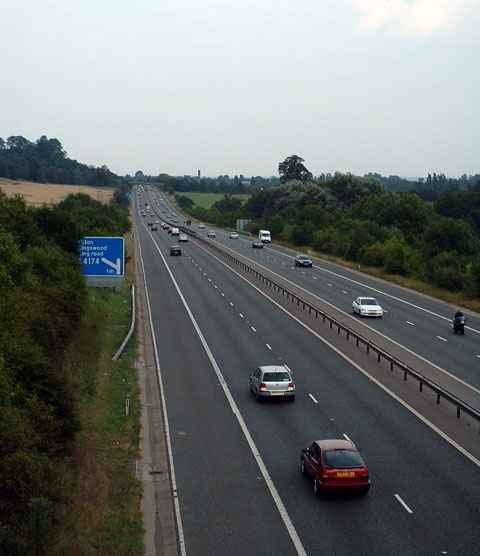
The M32 motorway is the highest-capacity route into Bristol City Centre

The A4174 "Avon ring road" serves as a relief road for parts of the northern, eastern, and southern suburbs of the city. During 2006 plans have been considered to extend the existing A4174 ring road to improve transport links in the south.

Bristol city centre was, until the 1990s, surrounded by the Inner Circuit Road. Its course included a dual carriageway road running diagonally through the centre of Queen Square. This has since been partially dismantled, but major routes still converge on the city centre. Radiating from this are several major arterial roads. The M32 motorway, constructed between 1966 and 1975, runs north from the centre to the M4, and is the busiest route. The A4 runs east to Keynsham and Bath, and west via the Portway through the Avon Gorge to the M5 at Avonmouth. The northern suburbs are served by the A4018 and A38 Gloucester Road, the east by the A420, A431 and A432 and the south by the A37 and A38. Several other commuter towns also lie on major routes radiating from the city, including Weston-super-Mare on the A370 and Portishead on the A369.

=== Clean Air Zone ===
Bristol City Council introduced a Clean Air Zone in November 2022, which charges drivers of more polluting vehicles (those not compliant with petrol Euro 4 or diesel Euro 6). Cars, vans and taxis are charged £9 per day, while buses, coaches and goods vehicles over 3.5 tonnes are charged £100 per day. The council estimates that 71% of vehicles entering the zone are already compliant. There are exemptions for vehicles in the disabled tax classes, certain types of specialist vehicles and those visiting hospitals in the Bristol Royal Infirmary complex, but an exemption for Blue Badge holders and a financial assistance scheme have now ended. Motorcycles are also exempt.

== Cycling ==
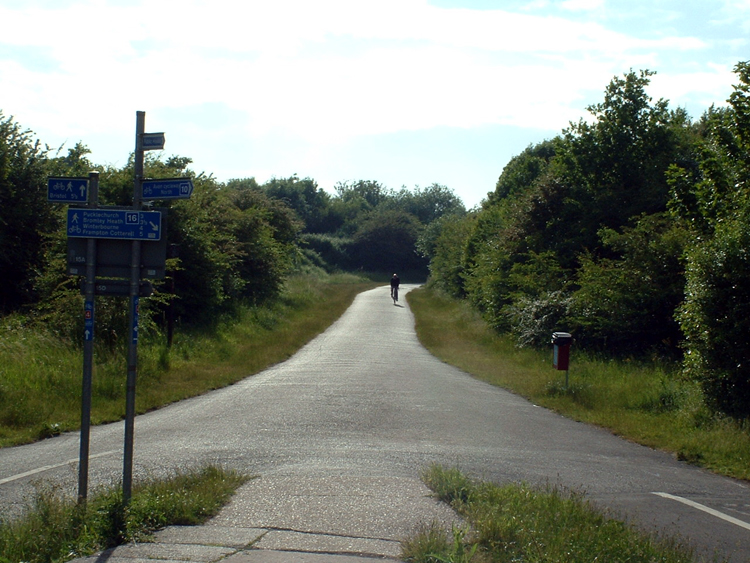
The Bristol & Bath Railway Path

Despite being hilly, Bristol is one of the prominent cycling cities of England and home to the national cycle campaigning group Sustrans. It has a number of urban cycle routes, as well as links to National Cycle Network routes to Bath and London, to Gloucester and Wales, and to the south-western peninsula of England. In 2011, 7.7% of journeys to work were by bicycle.

Bristol was awarded £22.8 million in 2011 to double its cycling population after being awarded "cycling city" status. The program lead to new cycle routes, more cycle parking, better signage and training and events.

Routes in Bristol include the Bristol and Bath Railway Path, Concorde Way between the centre and north Bristol, Festival Way between the centre and the town of Nailsea, Malago and Filwood Greenways to the south of Bristol and Frome Valley Greenway to the north-east of Bristol. Improvements to The Centre have created new cycle paths to better connect radial routes together.

== Electric scooters ==
A trial of e-scooters by WECA was started in partnership with Swedish company Voi in 2020. The scooters can be hired by anyone with a provisional driver's licence over 18 for a fee. In June 2023 it was announced that operation of scooters would be taken over by another company, Tier.

== Motorcycles ==
Bristol city council recognises that motorcycle use eases congestion as motorcycles take up less space both on the road and when parked. Its motorcycling policy includes the following:

- Motorcycles have been allowed to use most of the bus lanes in the city since 1996. Bristol was one of the first cities in the United Kingdom to permit bus lane use, following a campaign by the local branch of the Motorcycle Action Group (MAG). Motorcycles are also permitted to use the high-occupancy vehicle lane (HOV) on the A370 Long Ashton bypass and the HOV lane on the A4174 ring road.
- Free motorcycle specific parking areas are provided across the city, which are fitted with ground anchors so that motorcycles can be locked. A map is published by the city council showing these and other areas where motorcycles can be parked for free.
- The local Safety Camera Partnership uses money from speeding fines to fund motorcycle safety courses for riders from Bristol, Bath & North East Somerset, North Somerset and South Gloucestershire.

== Car clubs ==
Car club operators in the Bristol area include Co Wheels and Zipcar.

== Concerns ==
The rate of traffic increase in the Greater Bristol area has been up to three times the national average, and (around 2011) during peak time 50% of motorway traffic was local. Without intervention, the council predicted in 2006 that by 2016 an additional 20,000 people would be commuting in cars. Average peak time speeds in Bristol in 2006 were 16 mph (26 km/h), the lowest of the eight English "core cities", with 23% of journey times spent stationary, costing the local economy £350 million per year. Cars were used for 45% of journeys under 2 km, and 68% of 2–5 km journeys. The dormitory towns of Weston-super-Mare, Clevedon and Portishead, which have good connections to the M5 but poor public transport systems, contribute to the congestion, and have growing populations.

== Future developments ==
Since 2000 the city council has included a light rail system in its Local Transport Plan, but has so far been unable to fund the project. The city was offered European Union funding for the system, but the Department for Transport did not provide the required additional funding. In November 2016, the West of England Local Enterprise Partnership began a consultation process on their Transport Vision Summary Document, outlining potential light rail/tram routes from the city centre to Bristol Airport, the eastern and north west fringes of the city, and a route along the A4 road to Bath. In 2017, a further feasibility study will be undertaken into the possibility of an underground light rail system.

As well as improvements to public transport, the 2005 Greater Bristol Strategic Transport Study, commissioned by the regional government office, recommended road building to tackle congestion. These include re-routing and extended the South Bristol Ring Road. The road is currently partially single carriageway and indirect, terminating at the A38 in a built-up area. When the current sections of the road were built it was intended that the road would continue as dual carriageway to a section of the A38 further south, and development prevented on the intended route. The proposals follow this route west from Hengrove Park roundabout to the A38 at Castle Farm (phase 1), and from there to the A370 near Long Ashton Park and Ride (phase 2). There are additional recommendations (phase 3) for a new Whitchurch bypass from Hengrove Park roundabout, along the base of Dundry Hill, around Stockwood and joining the existing A4174 at Hicks Gate roundabout on the A4. Phase one and two of the ring road are the only major road building schemes adopted by the Joint Local Transport Plan, which claimed they would reduce delays across the Greater Bristol area by 6%, and lead to a 9% increase in public transport use. Bristol City Council has since endorsed all three phases, hoping to begin construction of the first two phases in 2010 and 2011, and the third phase potentially some time after 2016.

There are several other major road developments proposed by the Strategic Transport Study. Emersons Green, a rapidly expanding business and industrial suburb with a £300 million "science park" currently in development, could be connected to the M4, with a new junction where the motorway crosses the dismantled Midlands railway (ST689779) and a new road following the route of the railway to the A4174 roundabout (ST675771). When St Philip's Causeway was built by Bristol Development Corporation in the 1980s, connecting the M32 in St Pauls to the A4 at Arno's Vale, it was originally intended to be part of a larger road scheme. A proposed Callington Road Link would extend the road along the route of the dismantled Radstock railway line to the A4174, with a junction on the A4. Bristol Airport has also been attracting increasing levels of transport to roads south of Bristol, and an Airport link has been discussed for several years. Two schemes are suggested in the STS, both entirely new roads. One route connects Junction 20 of the M5 at Clevedon to the west end of the Long Ashton bypass as a new "Nailsea Bypass", coupled with an "Orange Route" link from the Long Ashton bypass, approximately one kilometre from its west end, to the A38 at the B3130 junction. The other route would run from the A38 just south of the airport, north of Wrington and south of Congresbury to the M5 at Weston-super-Mare. The final major project proposal is a second Avonmouth Bridge. This would be a lower level to the M5 bridge, with a swing or lifting mechanism, to the West of the existing bridge, and would relieve the motorway of the local traffic it carries.

Work began in 2015 on the MetroBus bus rapid transit system and was planned to be operational by Spring 2017, however the first route did not start operating until 29 May 2018. MetroBus provides a new faster public transport service and aims to tackle traffic congestion, improving transport links to South Bristol, reducing journey times and eliminate the need for bus changes. A new MetroBus route between Cribbs Causeway and Bristol Parkway is planned to start operating in Spring 2023. Rail services in Bristol currently suffer from overcrowding and there is a proposal to increase rail capacity under the Greater Bristol Metro scheme.

== Transport used for commute ==
Source: 2011 census. Method used for travel to work by usual residents of each area.

Mode of transport	Bristol Council Area %	Bristol Built-up Area %	England %
Car driver	49.9	56.0	57.0
On foot	19.3	15.7	10.7
Bus or coach	9.6	8.5	7.5
Car passenger	4.9	5.0	5.0
Bicycle	7.7	6.7	3.0
Motorcycle	1.1	1.2	0.8
Taxi	0.3	0.3	0.5
Other	0.7	0.6	4.7
Work from home	4.6	4.4	5.4
