= South Bristol, England =

Coordinates: 51.42°N 2.57°W

South Bristol
- Location within Bristol
- Unitary authority: Bristol
- Ceremonial county: Bristol
- Region: South West
- Country: England
- Sovereign state: United Kingdom
- Police: Avon and Somerset
- Fire: Avon
- Ambulance: South Western

South Bristol is the part of Bristol, England south of the Bristol Avon. It is almost entirely made up of the areas of the city historically in Somerset, and since the abolition of the county Avon, consists of the southern suburbs in the county of Bristol. Definitions sometimes also include areas of North Somerset, including Long Ashton, Nailsea and Backwell.

== History ==
South Bristol originated from the area of Redcliffe, once a separate town. In 1373 Redcliffe became part of Bristol to form the city and county of Bristol. In the 19th century South Bristol expanded to absorb Bedminster and Brislington. Although it has historically and continues to this day, to be smaller than North Bristol, in the 20th century new housing estates such as Hengrove, Hartcliffe and Withywood significantly increased the size of South Bristol. These estates were mainly built on former open farmland, similar to the later development of the North Fringe, rather than by infilling of already partially built up areas, as happened in North East Bristol. Nowadays, the area is largely residential. However, Temple and Redcliffe on the innermost edges of South Bristol have and continue to experience intense mixed use development. Bedminster also continues to undergo development, and has always been a large shopping area this side of the city, centred around East Street and North Street.

== Boundaries ==
Some confusion may occur as to the boundary between North and South Bristol as many do not realise that the New Cut is a man made channel made in the early 1800s. The boundary lies along the original course of the Avon, now the Floating Harbour as far as Totterdown Basin.

The council wards located in the Bristol South parliamentary constituency are as follows, along with their population estimated by Bristol City Council in 2019:

- Bedminster - 12,500
- Bishopsworth - 11,400
- Filwood - 13,800
- Hartcliffe and Withywood - 19,000
- Hengrove and Whitchurch Park - 17,200
- Knowle - 13,300
- Southville - 12,700
- Stockwood - 11,600
- Windmill Hill - 13,700

Some wards of Bristol East, including parts of Brislington, are a part of South Bristol. Furthermore, some areas of North Somerset including Long Ashton, Nailsea and Backwell are also included in definitions of South Bristol.

== Politics ==
South Bristol has its own parliamentary constituency, Bristol South, and has traditionally been strongly represented by the Labour Party, the areas of Brislington, St Anne's and Stockwood are in Bristol East.

In the 2016 European Union membership referendum, South Bristol was the part of the city with the narrowest majority in favour of remaining in the European Union. 47% of voters voted to Leave, while 53% voted to Remain, compared with a city average of 38% and 62% respectively. The areas closest to the city centre had the strongest votes for Remain (with 76% support in Southville), with the more outlying areas being much more opposed to the EU (for example in Hartcliffe and Withywood, where 67% voted to leave).

On 30 September 1896 South Bristol became a civil parish, being formed from Bedminster, Abbots Leigh, Easton-in-Gordano, Long Ashton, Portbury and Portishead. On 1 April 1898 the parish was abolished to form Bristol.

== Transport ==
Road connections in the area are poor in comparison with the opposite side of the city. No motorways pass through South Bristol; primary roads servicing the area are the A370 to Weston, the A38 to Bristol Airport and the A37 to Shepton Mallet and Dorset.

The only railway line serving the area is the Bristol–Exeter line. Heading southwest out of Temple Meads, it serves stations at Bedminster and Parson Street. There are also plans to reopen Ashton Gate railway station, located on the edge of the city west of Parson Street. The Great Western main line passes through the area too, heading southeast out of the city towards Bath. However, no stations are currently open between Temple Meads and Keynsham in North Somerset. This leaves a large stretch of southeast Bristol unserved by rail. MetroWest plans detail eventual ambitions to reopen St Anne's Park railway station, approximately 2 miles east of Temple Meads, which closed in 1970. The former Bristol and North Somerset Railway passed through Whitchurch roughly following the A37 road into Bath and North East Somerset.

First West of England operates bus services in South Bristol, with routes 24, 75, 76, 90, 91, 92 and 96 serving the area. The A1 and A2 Bristol Flyer routes from the city centre to Bristol Airport serve the area, along with Bath Bus Company's A4 service from Bath to the airport. In 2018/19, the MetroBus bus rapid transit lines m1 and m2 opened. The West of England Combined Authority is also investigating a potential light rail or metro line between the city centre and airport via South Bristol.

Bristol's first main airport was Bristol (Whitchurch) Airport located in Whitchurch, and was in use until 1957.

== Future development ==
Recent development of the Greater Bristol urban area has been primarily concentrated on the North Fringe of the city, along with the East Fringe - examples including Emersons Green; at the expense of the southern suburbs. In 2017 the South Bristol Link Road opened along the southern boundary of the city.

Housing developer Taylor Wimpey submitted a proposal to North Somerset council to develop greenfield land outside Ashton Vale, a project known as The Vale. The proposal outlined plans for 4,500 homes to be built as three separate villages, but attracted criticism from the council due to it using land currently allocated to the Avon Green Belt.

The former Whitchurch Airport site has been partially developed, with a leisure centre and the South Bristol Community Hospital opening in 2012. In 2019, planning permission for 1,400 homes on the former airfield was given by Bristol City Council.

The West of England Joint Spatial Plan outlined plans for 2,500 new homes in Whitchurch along with an orbital road to link the A4 with the A37. These proposals are uncertain following the Planning Inspectorate's rejection of the plan in 2019.

== See also ==
- South Bristol College
- South Bristol Community Hospital
