= South Bristol =

South Bristol may refer to:

- South Bristol, England, the southerly parts of the city of Bristol
- South Bristol, Maine, a town in the United States
- South Bristol, New York, a town in the United States

== See also ==
- Bristol South (UK Parliament constituency)
