= Bristol Parkway railway station =

Railway station in Stoke Gifford, Gloucestershire, England

Bristol Parkway
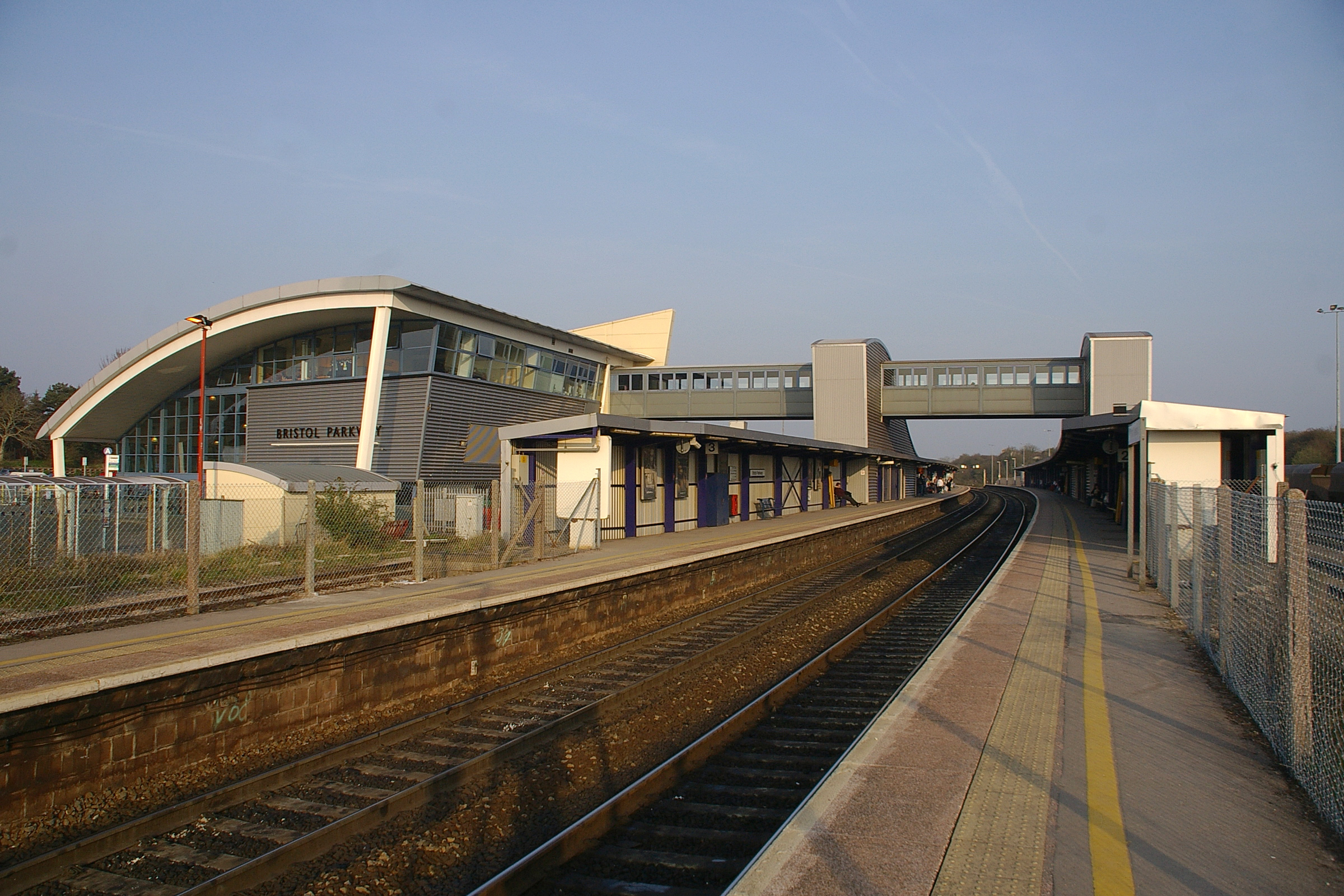
- A 2009 view of Bristol Parkway station from the west, prior to electric wires being erected/installed through the station

General information
- Location: Stoke Gifford, South Gloucestershire; England
- Coordinates: 51.5136°N 2.5427°W
- Grid reference: ST624795
- Manager: Great Western Railway
- Platforms: 4

Other information
- Station code: BPW
- Classification: DfT category B

History
- Original company: Western Region of British Railways

Key dates
- 1 May 1972: Station opened
- 1 July 2001: Refurbishment completed
- 9 May 2007: Third platform opened
- 13 April 2018: Fourth platform opened

Passengers
- 2021/22: ▲1.414 million
- Interchange: ▲0.549 million
- 2022/23: ▲1.824 million
- Interchange: ▲0.678 million
- 2023/24: ▲2.069 million
- Interchange: ▲0.902 million
- 2024/25: ▲2.326 million
- Interchange: ▼0.875 million
- 2025/26: ▲2.584 million
- Interchange: ▼0.896 million
Location
Notes
- Passenger statistics from the Office of Rail and Road

Bristol Parkway, on the South Wales Main Line, serves the villages of Stoke Gifford and Harry Stoke in South Gloucestershire, England. Despite its name, it is located in South Gloucestershire rather than Bristol itself, and is the busiest station in the county. It is 112 miles (180 km) from London Paddington. The station was opened in 1972 by British Rail and rebuilt in 2001. It is the third-most heavily used station in the West of England combined authority area, after Bristol Temple Meads and Bath Spa. There are four platforms, and a well-equipped waiting area. The station is managed by Great Western Railway, who provide most of the trains at the station, with CrossCountry providing the others.

Electrification using 25 kV 50 Hz AC overhead system reached Bristol Parkway in late 2018, and electric trains in the Swindon and London direction commenced passenger service on 30 December 2018. This was part of the 21st-century modernisation of the Great Western Main Line.

== Description ==
Bristol Parkway is located in the unitary authority of South Gloucestershire, in the Stoke Gifford area of the Bristol conurbation. The immediate surrounding area is mostly residential, with farmland to the south east. The main road access is from the west, with the station situated close to the M4, M5 and M32 motorways – the latter being the Bristol "Parkway" from which the station takes its name – as well as the A4174 Avon Ring Road. The station is on the South Wales Main Line from London to Swansea, 111 miles 68 chains (180.01 km) from the eastern terminus at London Paddington. (Note: Railways in the United Kingdom are, for historical reasons, measured in miles and chains. There are 80 chains to the mile.) It is also on the Cross Country Route from Bristol Temple Meads to York.

Just to the west of the station is Stoke Gifford Junction, where the Henbury Loop Line to Avonmouth Docks and Cross Country Route to Temple Meads diverge from the line to South Wales. Stoke Gifford train maintenance depot is within the junction's confines. To the east is a Network Rail maintenance training centre. The next station north along the Cross Country Route is Yate, the next station south is Filton Abbey Wood. The next station east along the South Wales Main Line is Swindon, and the next station west is Patchway, although only two trains per day call at both Bristol Parkway and Patchway.

The station is on an east–west alignment, with the main station building and car park to the north of the line. There are six lines through the station, of which the inner four have platforms, the outer two being goods loops. There is a goods yard adjacent to the station to the south. The station has four platforms, numbered 1 to 4 from south to north. Platforms 1 and 2 share an island to the south of the two central lines; platform 1 is on the south side of the island and serves mainly southbound trains towards Bristol Temple Meads. Platform 2 is on the north side of the island and serves westbound trains towards Wales and Bristol Temple Meads. Platforms 3 and 4 share an island to the north of the two central running lines. Platform 3 serves mainly inter-city trains towards London and Birmingham New Street, while platform 4 is usually reserved for local services. An enclosed footbridge provides access to the platforms, approximately a third of the way along platforms 2 and 3 (from west to east), and at the west end of platforms 1 and 4. Platforms 2 and 3 are opposite each other, while platforms 1 and 4 are offset from platform 3, starting at the footbridge and extending further to the east. All platforms are 280 metres (310 yd) long. All platforms are signalled for bidirectional running. The footbridge can be accessed by both stairs and lifts.

The station building, a metal construction with a curved roof, opened in 2001. It contains a booking office, waiting rooms, payphones, cash machines, shops, toilets and a café overlooking the tracks. There are waiting rooms on each platform, as well as vending machines and LED displays giving next train information. Ticket barriers are in use at the station. The pay-and-display car park, run by APCOA, has 1,810 spaces.

Bristol Parkway was among the first of a new generation of park and ride railway stations, and many passengers use it for that purpose. Over the decade 2002–2012, the number of passengers starting or ending a journey at Bristol Parkway grew by 1 million passengers per year to 2.25 million, with a further 740,000 passengers changing trains there, giving an annual footfall of just under 3 million passengers and making it the 216th busiest station in the country and the third busiest in the West of England (after Bristol Temple Meads and Bath Spa) as of the 2011/12 financial year. In the 2006/07 financial year, over 100,000 passengers used Parkway to travel to or from Bristol Temple Meads, and a further 500,000 used it to travel to or from London Paddington.

The line through Bristol Parkway has a linespeed of 60 miles per hour (97 km/h) on platforms 2 and 3 (40 miles per hour (64 km/h) westbound on platform 3), and 25 miles per hour (40 km/h) on platform 4. The loading gauge is W8, and the line handles over 20 million train tonnes per year. The lines through the station were electrified in late 2018 as part of the 21st-century modernisation of the Great Western Main Line.

== Services ==
=== Rail ===
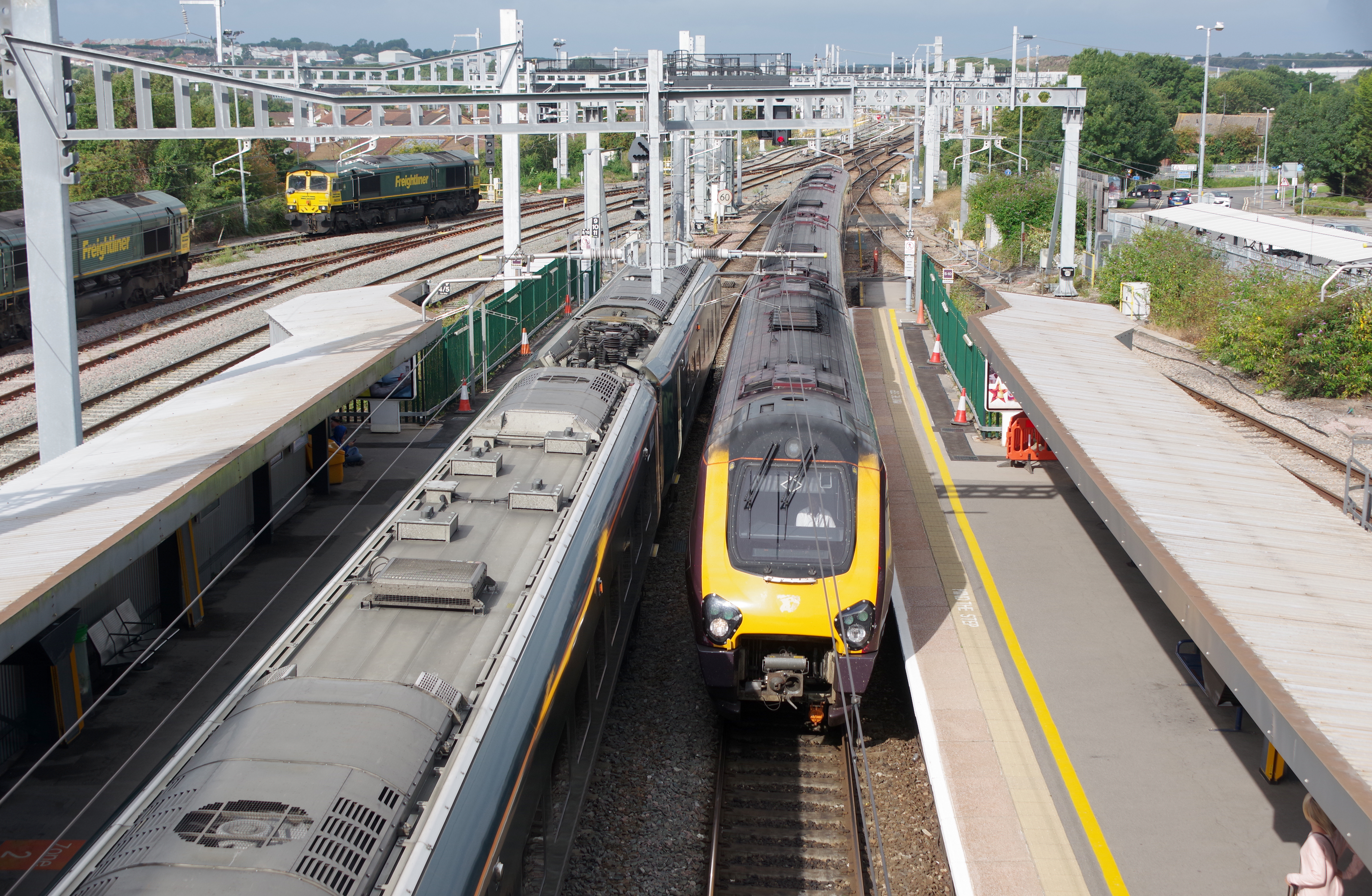
Bristol Parkway is served by intercity services operated by CrossCountry and Great Western Railway. Here, a northbound CrossCountry service (right) passes a westbound Great Western Railway service.

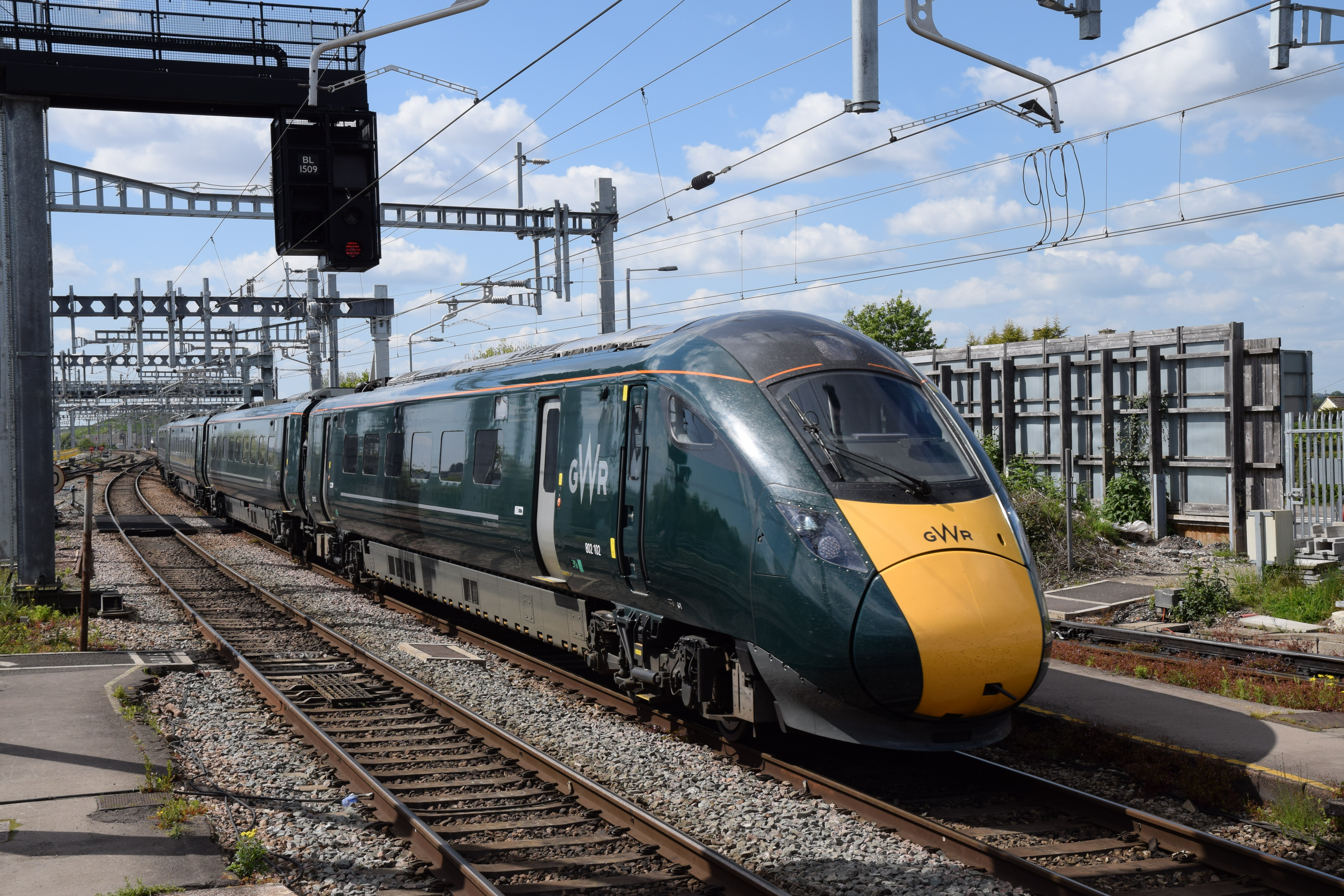
A Great Western Railway service from Swansea to London.

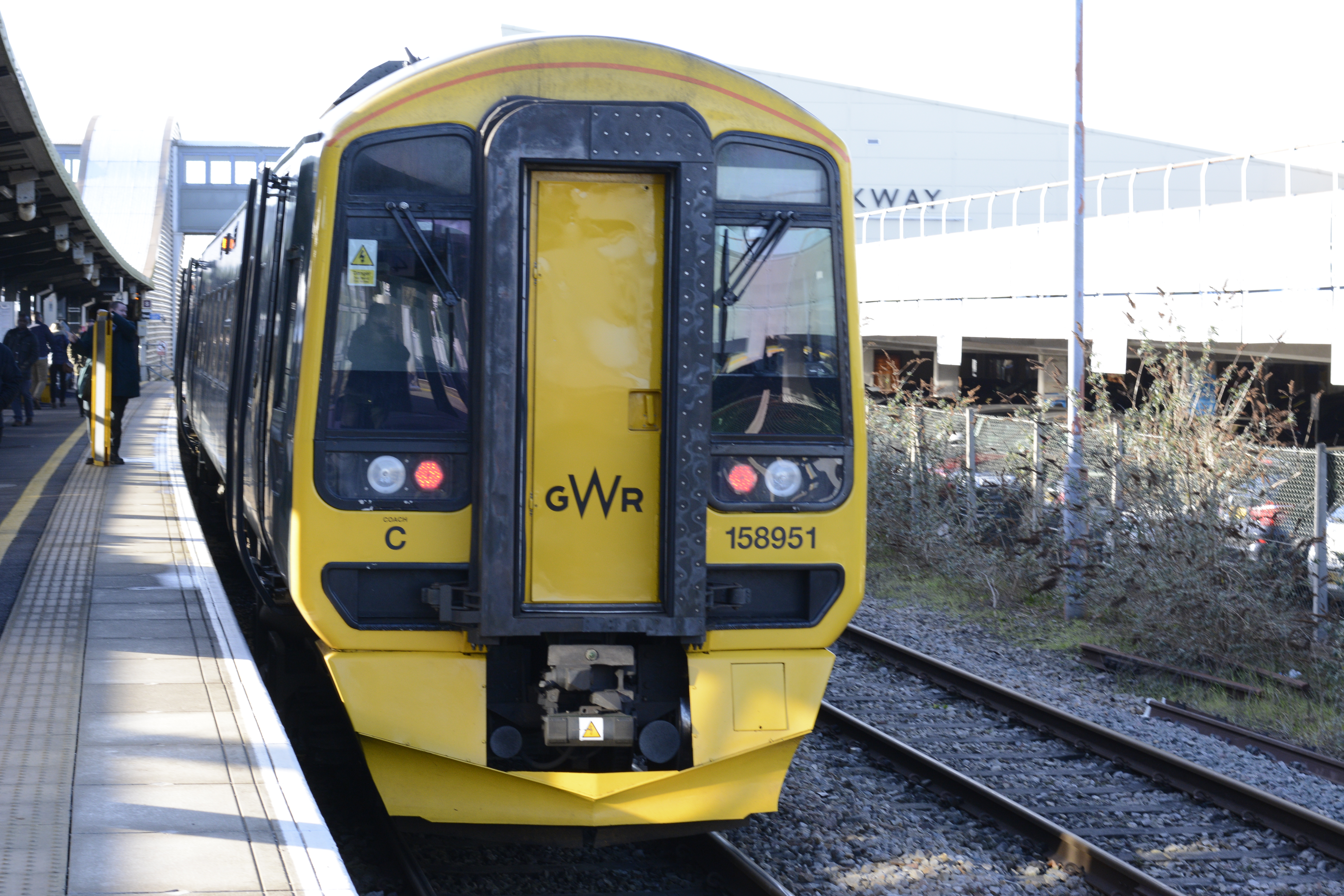
Local stopping services operated by Great Western Railway serve the station as well. Here a Class 158 awaits its next duties.

The station is managed by Great Western Railway, who operate most rail services from the station. Their weekday service consists of two trains per hour each way between London Paddington and Cardiff Central (one extended to Swansea), one service each way between Westbury and Gloucester via Bristol Temple Meads, and one train per hour between Worcester Foregate Street and Temple Meads (one train every two hours extended to Great Malvern and Weymouth).

CrossCountry also operate trains from Bristol Parkway. Their weekday service consists of one hourly train each way between Bristol Temple Meads and Manchester Piccadilly, and one hourly train each way between Plymouth, Bristol and Edinburgh Waverley via Leeds and Newcastle. Both these services run via Birmingham New Street.

Great Western Railway services between London and South Wales are formed of Class 800 or Class 802 bi-mode multiple units, while other GWR services are formed using Class 43 locomotives with British Rail Mark 3 "Castle Class" sets, Class 158, 165 and 166 diesel multiple-unit trains. CrossCountry services are formed of Class 220 and 221 Voyager diesel-electric multiple units.

The standard journey time to London Paddington is 90 minutes, to Cardiff Central 40 minutes, to Birmingham New Street 75 minutes, and to Bristol Temple Meads 12 minutes.

In December 2022, the ORR gave approval to the open access company Grand Union to commence a service from Paddington to Carmarthen in partnership with Spanish rail operator Renfe, for which a fleet of new bi-mode trains will be used. The new service was scheduled to commence in December 2024. The service will call at Bristol Parkway, Severn Tunnel Junction, Newport, Cardiff Central, Gowerton and Llanelli en-route to Carmarthen, and will provide Bristol Parkway with regular non-stop trains to London. In December 2024, following FirstGroup's acquisition of Grand Union Trains, it was announced the proposed London Paddington to Carmarthen service would be operated by Lumo.

Preceding station	National Rail	Following station
Bristol Temple Meads	CrossCountry; Bristol – Manchester	Cheltenham Spa
Bristol Temple Meads	CrossCountry; South West – North East and Scotland	Cheltenham Spa
Swindon	Great Western Railway; London – Cardiff/Swansea	Newport
Yate	Great Western Railway; Great Malvern/Gloucester – Westbury/Weymouth	Filton Abbey Wood
Terminus	Great Western Railway; Bristol Parkway – Weston-super-Mare	Filton Abbey Wood
	Future services	
London Paddington	Lumo; London - Carmarthen	Severn Tunnel Junction

=== Bus ===
Bristol Parkway is served by bus routes linking it with the rest of Bristol and South Gloucestershire, including Avonmouth, Severn Beach, Cribbs Causeway, Bath, Temple Meads, Southmead Hospital, Chipping Sodbury and Yate. These routes are operated by First West of England and Stagecoach West. Metrobus route m4 started on 22 January 2023, connecting Cribbs Causeway via Parkway to Bristol.

== History ==
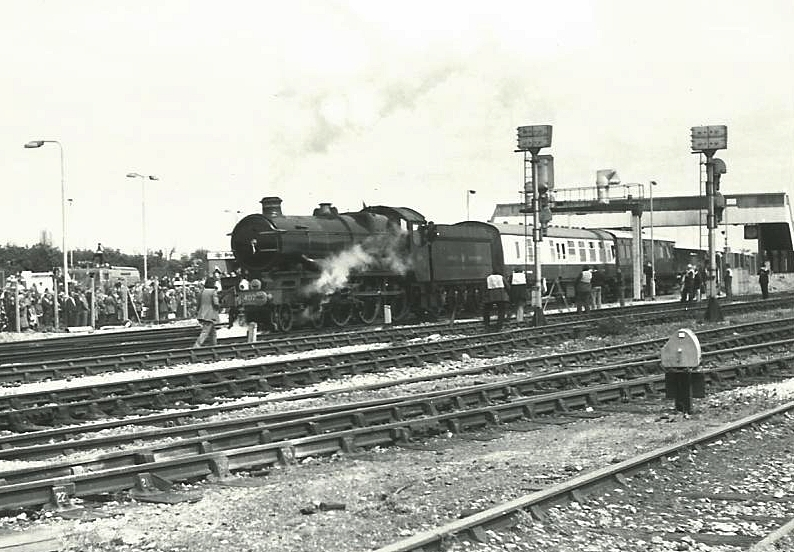
Steam locomotive Pendennis Castle at Bristol Parkway in 1977.

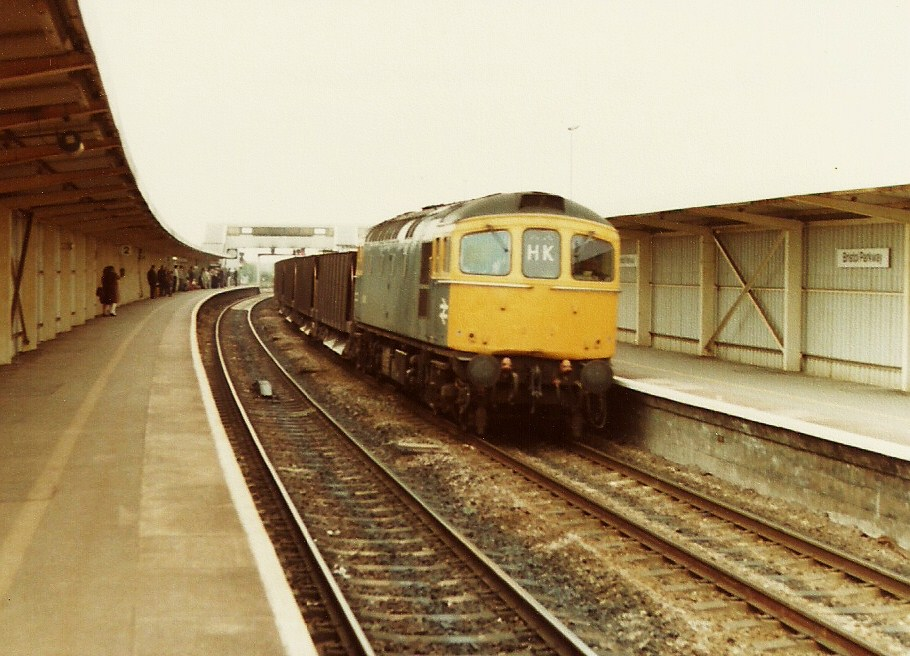
A Class 33 locomotive hauls a freight train through Bristol Parkway in 1980. The walls behind the platforms had been added by this time.

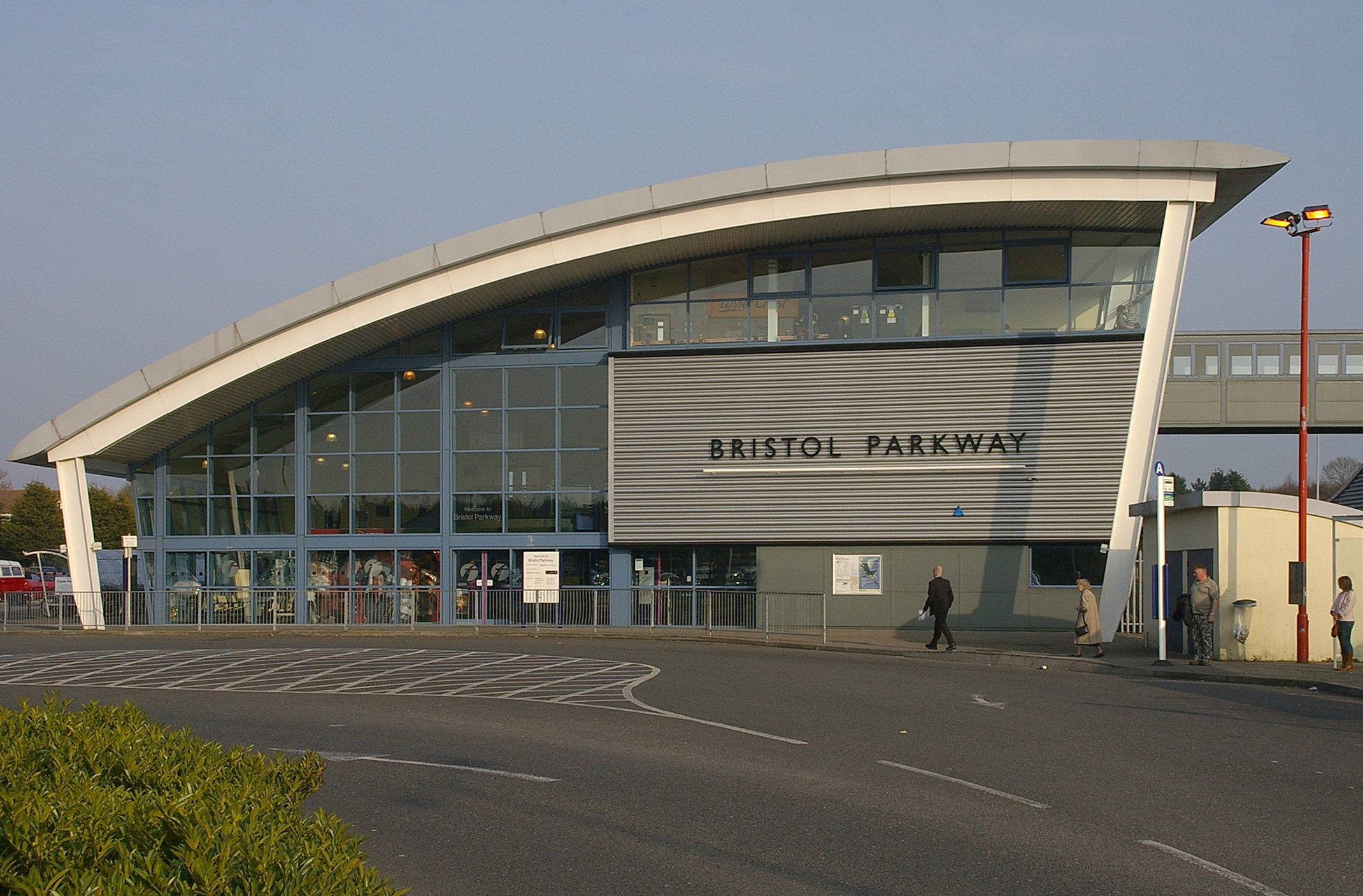
The current station building was built in 2000.

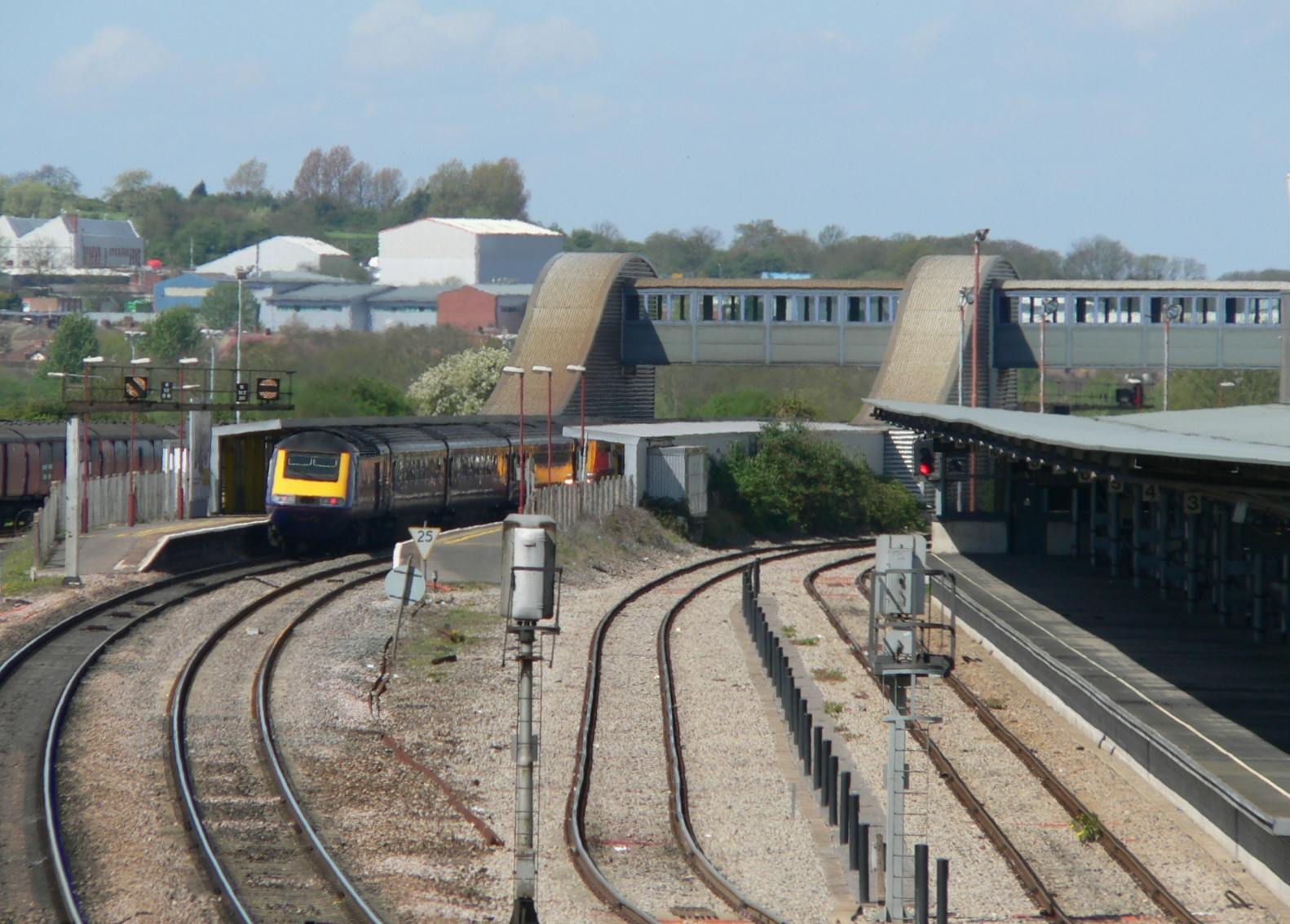
A westbound First Great Western HST set at Bristol Parkway in 2006. The site of what would become platform 4 can be seen, as can the platforms for the Royal Mail depot.

The line through Bristol Parkway was opened in 1903 as part of the Great Western Railway's "Badminton Line" from Wootton Bassett to Patchway, a short-cut for trains from London to South Wales, avoiding Bath and Chippenham. The station was built on the site of the Stoke Gifford marshalling yard, which closed on 4 October 1971, having become surplus to requirements with the cessation of wagonload freight trains. The station's development was seen as a response to the potential growth of housing and commercial developments in north Bristol, with proximity to the M4 and M5 motorway interchange at Almondsbury also important. The name "Parkway" came from proximity to the M32 motorway, known as the Bristol Parkway, although the term Parkway has since been applied to park and ride stations throughout the United Kingdom. When the station was built it was outside the developed urban area, but the growth of housing and commercial development in adjoining areas of the North Fringe has brought it within the conurbation, with many large office complexes opened nearby.

The station, owned by British Rail, opened on 1 May 1972. Services were operated by the Western Region until British Rail was split into business-led sectors in the 1980s, after which Parkway was served by the InterCity and Regional Railways divisions. The original structures, built by Stone & Co. of Bristol, were basic – two island platforms connected by an open metal footbridge, with a wood and brick building containing the booking facilities and waiting rooms. Platform 1 (the current platform 3), on the north side of the tracks, was for trains towards London and Birmingham, and platform 2 was for trains towards Wales and Bristol Temple Meads. The platforms were 256 metres (280 yd) long. The station opened with a 600-space car park and a fastest journey to London of 95 minutes, which was subsequently reduced to 75 minutes with the introduction of the new High Speed Trains in 1976. Platform canopies were added in 1973, along with a cover for the footbridge. Further minor improvements were implemented over the next thirty years, including a new booking office and extensions to the car park.

Following the privatisation of British Rail in 1997, services at Bristol Parkway were franchised to several train operating companies. South Wales Main Line services were provided by Great Western Trains, which was later rebranded as First Great Western; services from Bristol to Birmingham and the north were operated by Virgin CrossCountry; and local services were franchised to Wales & West, which was succeeded in 2001 by Wessex Trains. The Wessex franchise was amalgamated with the Great Western franchise into the Greater Western franchise from 2006, and awarded to First Great Western, which became known as Great Western Railway in 2016. Virgin CrossCountry services were taken over by Arriva CrossCountry in 2007.

In the August 1998, Royal Mail began construction of a mail terminal to the east of the station, taking over some of the station car park to provide a platform and warehouse for postal trains. The 12,000 square feet (1,100 m^{2}) building opened on 15 May 2000, replacing a similar facility at Bristol Temple Meads, with the Royal Mail stating it would save 250,000 miles (400,000 km) of lorry journeys per year on local roads. However, the depot closed only four years later in 2004, when Royal Mail ceased to use the rail network. Royal Mail offered the terminal for use by freight companies, but as there were no takers it was demolished in October 2007. In 2008, Network Rail opened a maintenance training centre on the site in a £2.5 million project which saw the construction of a mezzanine floor, a welding workshop and a 4,000 square feet (370 m^{2}) extension.

In 2000, work began on a complete redevelopment of the station building with a new enclosed footbridge. It opened on 1 July 2001, and featured lifts and generally enhanced facilities. Local roads were enhanced to help speed passengers' journeys to and from the station, and a new multi-storey car park was built to replace the spaces lost to the Royal Mail facility. A dedicated bus interchange was opened in 2003. In 2006, construction started on a new 278 metres (304 yd) long platform face on the north side of platform 1, to ease congestion for trains toward Birmingham and London. The new platform, platform 4, was opened on 9 May 2007 by rail minister Tom Harris MP. As part of the reconstruction, the waiting room at the east end of platform 1 was demolished, and replaced with an extended waiting area and customer help desk. Platform 1 was subsequently redesignated platform 3. The work cost £3 million and was funded by Network Rail, with First Great Western contributing £100,000 towards the new waiting room and help desk.

Despite the large car park, the increase in passenger numbers at Parkway led to problems with on-street parking, leading to the commissioning of a new 200-space car park 500 metres (550 yd) east of the station. It opened in Spring 2011, but was used by only 139 motorists in its first three months; it was expected that traffic would increase when a new bus link was opened to transfer drivers from the car park to the station. A new multi-storey car park on the station site with 710 spaces was opened on 5 September 2014 by Baroness Kramer, Minister of State for Transport. Construction of the car park, which began in mid-2013, caused a short-term lack of spaces for commuters. The car park cost £13 million and was funded jointly by Network Rail and the Department for Transport under the Station Commercial Projects Fund. Improved cycle facilities, including a bike hire scheme, were provided in the late 2000s.

The station was closed for two weeks in September 2017 to allow for upgrade work as part of the electrification and upgrade work for the Great Western route. Works included resignalling, installation of overhead electrification gantries, and the start of construction of a new fourth platform on the south side of platform 2. The new platform 1 took over an existing goods loop, allowing trains towards Bristol and towards Wales to be accommodated at the same time, thus easing a bottleneck. It was opened on 13 April 2018 by Chris Grayling MP, Secretary of State for Transport. The other platforms were lengthened to 280 metres (310 yd) at the same time. The station closed for three weeks in Autumn 2018 for further electrification works, including the installation and testing of overhead wires.

First Great Western declined a contractual option to continue the Greater Western passenger franchise beyond 2013, citing a desire for a longer-term contract due to the impending upgrade to the Great Western Main Line. The franchise was put out to tender but the process was halted and later scrapped due to the fallout from the collapse of the InterCity West Coast franchise competition. A two-year franchise extension until September 2015 was agreed in October 2013, and subsequently extended until March 2019. The CrossCountry franchise was due to expire in October 2019, but it was announced in September 2020 that the emergency timetables introduced to meet COVID-19 requirements would continue for a further 18 months and the letting of new franchises would be scrapped. As of 2024, the New CrossCountry franchise is let to Arriva-owned CrossCountry until 2027 and the Greater Western franchise to FirstGroup-owned Great Western Railway until 2028.

In 2024, the station names on the outside were replaced. Previously, it was in Gill Sans, with no National Rail logo. Now, it is New Rail Alphabet with a National Rail logo.

== Future ==
The South Wales Main Line from London to Cardiff has been electrified. However, the lines to Weston-super-Mare and the Cross Country Route to Birmingham New Street, the West Midlands, the East Midlands and Northern England will not be electrified, so local and CrossCountry services will still be provided by diesel trains. In 2011, the group Friends of Suburban Bristol Railways supported the electrification continuing to Weston, as did the Member of Parliament for Weston-super-Mare, John Penrose.

Bristol Parkway is on the Weston-super-Mare/Yate corridor, one of the main axes of MetroWest, a rail transport plan which aims to enhance transport capacity in the Bristol area. Under its previous name of Greater Bristol Metro, 2012 plans considered the reopening of the Henbury Loop Line to passengers, with the possibility of services from Bristol Temple Meads to Bristol Parkway via Clifton Down and Henbury. The current MetroWest Phase 2 proposals are for a spur to Henbury, served by trains from Bristol Temple Meads, without a direct connection to Parkway.

== See also ==
- List of all UK railway stations
- Transport in Bristol
- Rail services in the West of England
