= M32 motorway =

Motorway in England

M32
- M32 highlighted in blue
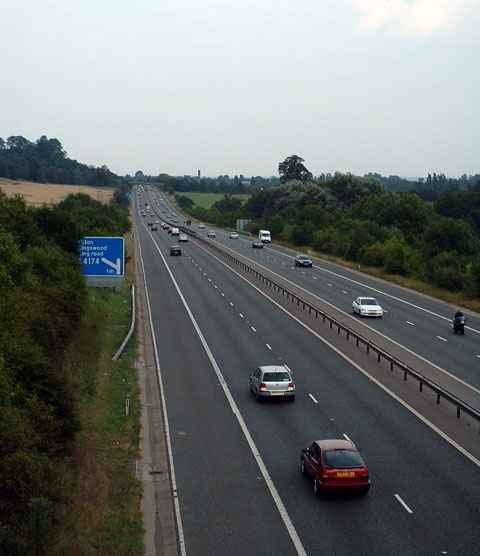
- The M32 between junctions 2 and 1, heading northwards, 2004

Route information
- Maintained by National Highways
- Length: 4.4 mi (7.1 km)
- Existed: 1966–present
- History: Constructed 1966 – 1975: M4 – J1 (1966); J1 – J2 (1970); J2 – J3 (1975)

Major junctions
- North end: Hambrook
- M4 motorway J1 -> A4174 road J3 -> A4320 road A4032 road
- South end: St Pauls

Location
- Country: United Kingdom

Road network
- Roads in the United Kingdom; Motorways; A and B road zones
← M27	→ M40

The M32 is a 4.4-mile-long (7.1 km) motorway in South Gloucestershire and Bristol, England. It provides a link from the M4, a major motorway linking London and South Wales, to Bristol city centre and is maintained by National Highways, the national roads body.

The motorway was planned concurrently with the M4 in the 1960s, and construction was complete to Eastville in northeast Bristol by 1970. The southernmost section was delayed by engineering challenges and industrial action, and did not open until 1975. Since the mid-2000s, there have been plans to use the M32 as part of a park and ride facility which would reduce congestion in Bristol.

Though the M32 has a small traffic flow, it is one of the most congested motorways in the region as it connects a number of key areas. As well as providing one of the few high-quality routes into the centre of Bristol, it is the only significant link from the M4 to the A4174 Bristol Ring Road. Parts of the M32 are reaching the end of their intended lifespan, leading to reduced speed limits and occasional closures for remedial work. Local residents have criticised the M32, complaining that it has severed communities and has an unacceptable noise level.

== Route ==
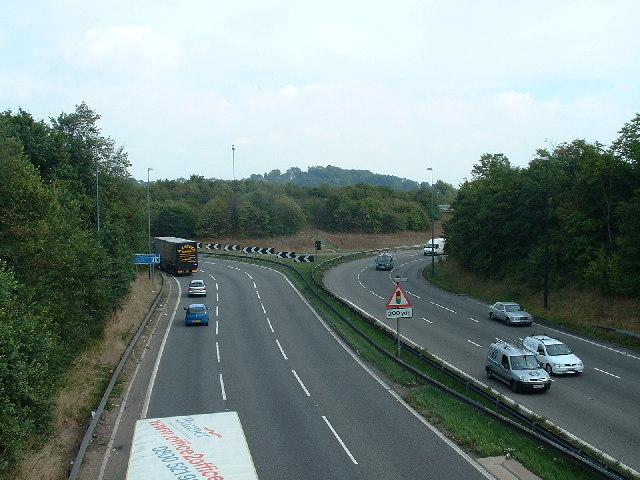
The northern section of the M32 connects to the M4 at a modified roundabout.

The M32 is 4.4 miles (7.1 km) long. Its northern end is at junction 19 of the M4, near Winterbourne Down. Originally a grade separated roundabout junction, it was modified in 1992 to remove conflicting traffic movements in order to increase capacity.

The motorway then runs south between Filton in the west and Frenchay in the east. After meeting the A4174 ring road at junction 1, it crosses the boundary from South Gloucestershire to Bristol, passing to the east of Horfield, Lockleaze and Easton. Junction 2, next to Eastville Park, meets the B4469 providing access to Horfield. Midway through, a 40 mph (64 km/h) speed limit begins. The motorway continues further south and ends just beyond junction 3, north of St Paul's. A dual carriageway continues as the A4032 into the centre of Bristol, with a 40 mph (64 km/h) speed limit. The tower of St Agnes Church, adjacent to the M32 near junction 3, is a local landmark visible to motorists entering the city.

The M32 is a trunk road, therefore its maintenance and upkeep is paid for by National Highways, the national roads authority. Most of the road has two lanes in each direction, though an extended sliproad north of junction 2 provides a climbing lane, and the short section between junction 1 and the M4 has three lanes both ways.

== History ==
=== Construction ===
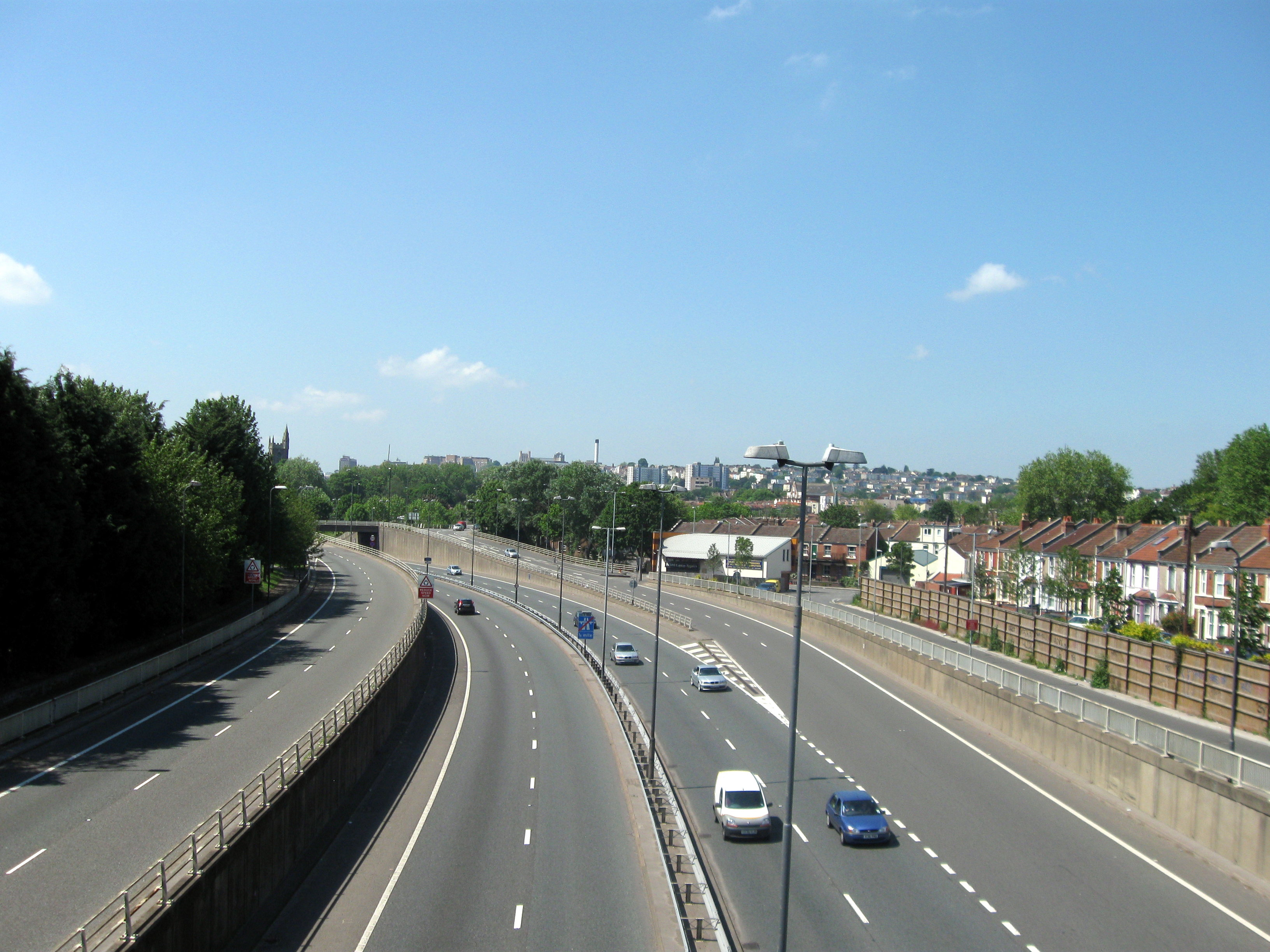
The southern section of the M32 was the last to be built and passes close to numerous housing estates.

The M32 was planned to be a key radial link through to the hub of a network of radial and ring roads within a rectangle encompassing Bristol. Other bounds of this scheme were parts of the M4 (north eastern side), the M5 (north western side) and the tidal reaches of the River Avon (south western side), the south eastern side not being defined by landmarks. The motorway was partly funded by Gloucestershire County Council and Bristol City Council, with a 75 per cent grant supplied by the national Ministry of Transport. It was provisionally called the Hambrook Spur or the Bristol Parkway during construction, and was built in three distinct stages between 1966 and 1975.

The first section, from the M4 to junction 1, opened concurrently with that motorway in September 1966. The second section, through to junction 2, was a co-operative design between the Gloucestershire county surveyor and the design consultants Freeman Fox & Partners. Construction was awarded to Sir Robert McAlpine, who began work in June 1968. The northern section was designed as a full-speed (70 mph (110 km/h)) motorway as far as Eastville, after which the motorway ran on an elevated section with a lower design standard. This section was opened by the Secretary of State for Transport, John Peyton in July 1970. The total cost was £3 million (now £41 million). In 1972, a polystyrene storage depot on Muller Road near junction 2 caught fire, leading to the closure of the southbound M32 for six days.

The third section was the most technically demanding, as it ran through heavily built-up urban areas and required numerous properties to be demolished, along with the 665-foot (203 m) "Thirteen-arch viaduct" near Stapleton Road that was built in 1874. Work was delayed owing to the Three-Day Week industrial action in 1974, and further because of a national builders' strike. During construction, the Local Government Act 1972 was passed, and responsibility passed to the newly created Avon County Council in April 1974. This section, and hence the full extent of the motorway, was opened to traffic in May 1975. The cost was reported to be £10.4 million (now £70 million).

=== Bus improvements ===
A bus lane, constructed in 2008 on the southbound carriageway of the A4032, Newfoundland Way, links the end of the M32 at junction 3 with Cabot Circus. It starts just north of junction 3 and runs for around 1,000 m (1,100 yards), adjacent to the central reservation, and becomes a general running lane for its final 165 yards (151 m) to a signal controlled junction. The hard shoulder and the remaining width of carriageway were rebuilt as two narrowed running lanes for general traffic, and the speed limit was reduced to 30 mph (48 km/h).

In 2009, the council announced that a park and ride facility would be developed next to the M32 to help alleviate congestion in the city centre. The project was expected to create 1,500 parking spaces and cost £191 million. In 2015, construction began on a bus-only junction between junctions 1 and 2, on land partly allocated to the Stapleton Allotments and near the Stoke Park estate. The project is part of the North Fringe to Hengrove MetroBus rapid transit route package, and involves creating new slip roads, a connecting route to Stoke Lane and a new bridge over the M32 to be completed by mid-2016. The bridge was lifted into place in June, which required closing the M32 to all traffic.

== Traffic ==
The M32 is a relatively lightly trafficked route compared to neighbouring motorways such as the M4 and M5, yet has still been described in the West of England Combined Authority's Joint Transport Plan as "by far, the busiest road corridor into Bristol." In 2001, the average daily traffic flow was 40,400 vehicles northbound and 39,900 southbound, while in 2014, the combined flow for both directions averaged 75,000 vehicles. Despite this, the M32 is frequently congested as it is a popular route into the centre of Bristol. During the morning rush hour, queues can tail back onto the motorway from the city centre. In 2014, the Highways Agency reported that the M32 between junctions 1 and 2 was the most unreliable motorway journey along the entire M4 corridor between London and South Wales, with over 56 per cent of journeys taking longer than predicted. The problem is exacerbated whenever there is an incident on the M4 around Bristol, as drivers attempt to use the M32 as a diversion route, creating further traffic and congestion.

The M32 forms a bottleneck at its northern end as it is the only link between the M4 and the A4174 Bristol Ring Road. In 2015, Chris Skidmore, Member of Parliament for Kingswood, launched the Gateway2Growth campaign, which would see a new road running from the M4 at Emersons Green to the A4174.

Highways England were concerned that the M32, especially its elevated sections, will reach its planned end-of-life around 2020. Urgent works were recommended on the Eastville Viaduct in particular, which had deficient surfacing, barriers and lighting. A 40 mph (64 km/h) speed limit was placed along the viaduct, while surveying work was carried out in 2016 during the Metrobus junction refurbishments.

== Community and environment ==
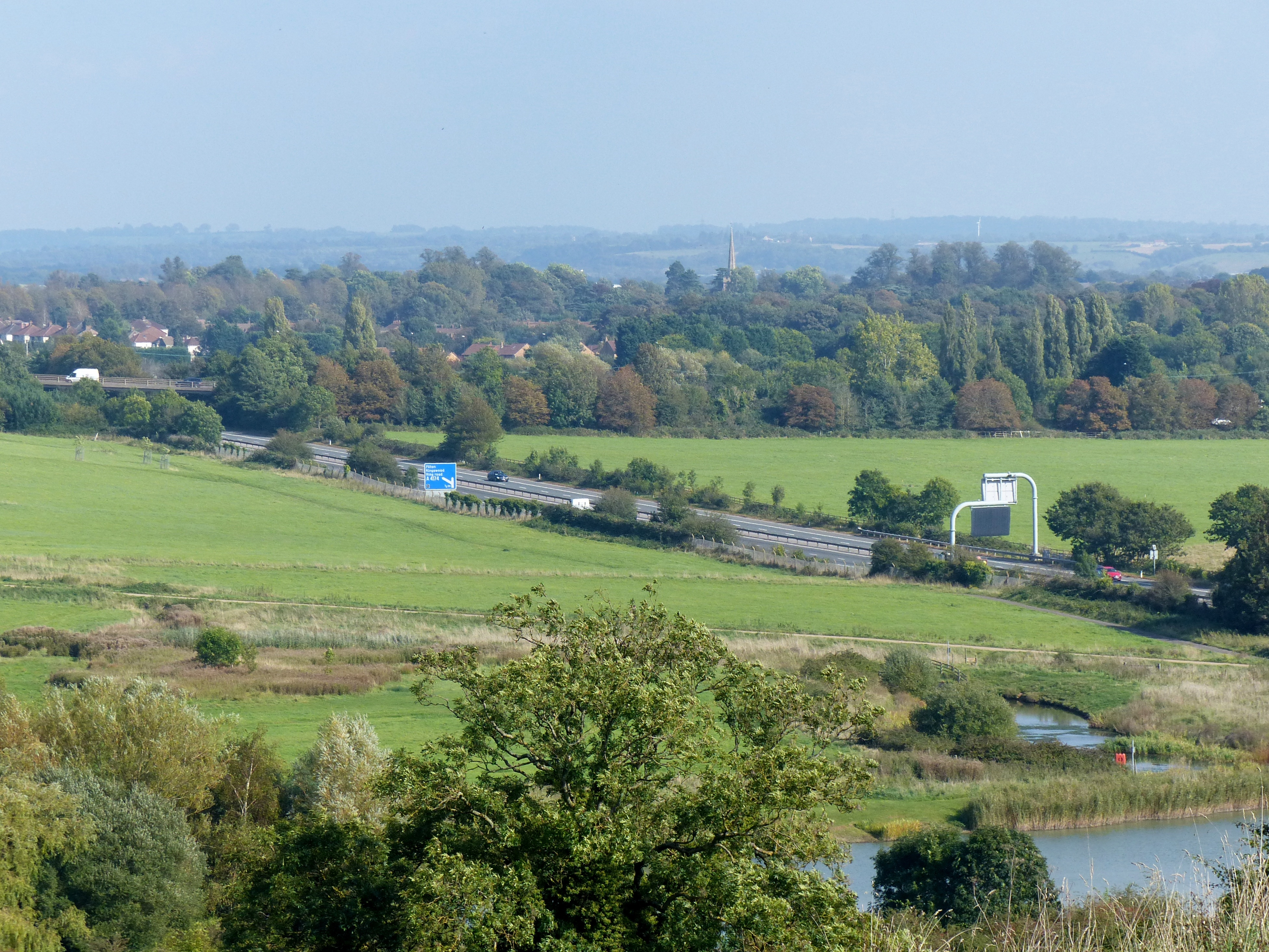
The M32 has been criticized for passing close to Stoke Park and part of the estate grounds were given up for the motorway.

The M32 has been criticised for severing longstanding links in Bristol. Older residents have claimed that formerly close-knit communities such as Easton have been shut off by the imposing concrete barriers next to the motorway. It has been criticised for running through the grounds of Stoke Park, spoiling the local atmosphere and requiring part of the estate including the Duchess Pond to be demolished. In 2008, Jeremy Isaacs claimed the motorway was a reason that Bristol did not win the European Capital of Culture award that year, adding that the M32 had created a "concrete divide" between Eastville, St Paul's and Easton.

Local residents have complained about the noise on the M32. A report by the Department for Environment, Food and Rural Affairs showed that traffic noise can be as loud as 75 decibels in neighbouring estates. In 2014, a petition was created to campaign Bristol City Council to install quieter road surfaces and noise barriers along the motorway.

In 2011, a council gardening scheme created a horticultural landscape next to the southern end of the M32. The project included planting of red poppies, cornflowers, and marigolds. A spokesman said they hoped it would enhance the view from the motorway and provide additional habitats for wildlife including bees and butterflies. The gardens were well received by locals and led to a city-wide project called Meadow Bristol, to grow similar meadows elsewhere.

In 2021, the Government proposed reducing the speed limit where it is still 70 mph (110 km/h) to 60 mph (97 km/h) to reduce the quantity of nitrogen dioxide emissions along the road.

== Junctions ==
Data from driver location signs are used to provide distance and carriageway identification information. Where a junction spans several hundred metres, both the start and end locations are given.

M32 motorway junctions
miles	km	Northbound exits (A carriageway)	Junction	Southbound exits (B carriageway)
5.0	8.0	London, Swindon M4(E); SOUTH WALES M4(W), SOUTH WEST, MIDLANDS (M5)	Terminus (M4 J19)	Bristol (C) M32, Ring Road (A4174)
5.0	8.0	London, Swindon M4(E); SOUTH WALES M4(W), SOUTH WEST, MIDLANDS (M5)	Terminus (M4 J19)	Start of motorway
4.5; 4.3	7.3; 6.9	Filton, Kingswood, Ring Road A4174	J1	Ring Road, Filton, Kingswood A4174
		Entering South Gloucestershire		Entering Bristol
1.9; 1.7	3.0; 2.7	Stapleton & Frenchay; Horfield & Fishponds	J2	Fishponds, Horfield B4469
0.9; 0.7	1.4; 1.1	Start of motorway	J3; Terminus	A4320 Bath (A4)
0.9; 0.7	1.4; 1.1	Chippenham (A420), Bath (A431) A4320	J3; Terminus	Road continues as A4032 to Bristol City Centre
1.000 mi = 1.609 km; 1.000 km = 0.621 mi
