= MetroBus (Bristol) =

Metrobus system in Bristol, UK

metrobus
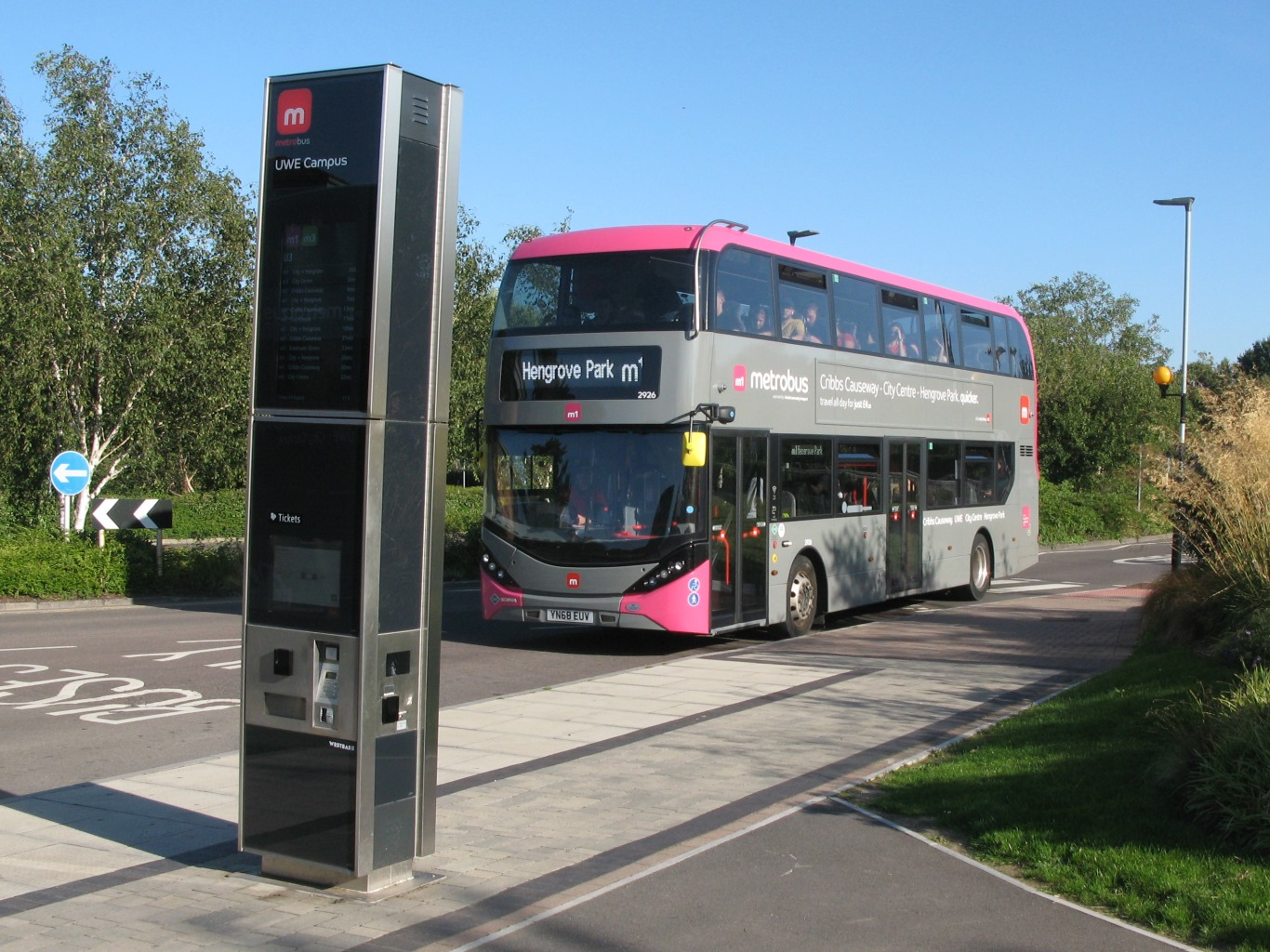

Overview
- Owner: Bristol City Council; North Somerset Council; South Gloucestershire Council
- Locale: Bristol, England
- Transit type: Guided busway and Bus rapid transit
- Number of lines: 5
- Website: travelwest.info/metrobus

Operation
- Began operation: 29 May 2018
- Operator: First West of England

Technical
- System length: 31 mi (50 km)

MetroBus (stylised as metrobus) is a Bus Rapid Transit system in Bristol, England, created as a joint project between Bristol, North Somerset and South Gloucestershire councils. The first route, service m3, began operations on 29 May 2018, followed by m2 on 3 September 2018, m1 on 6 January 2019 and m4 on 22 January 2023.

== Overview ==
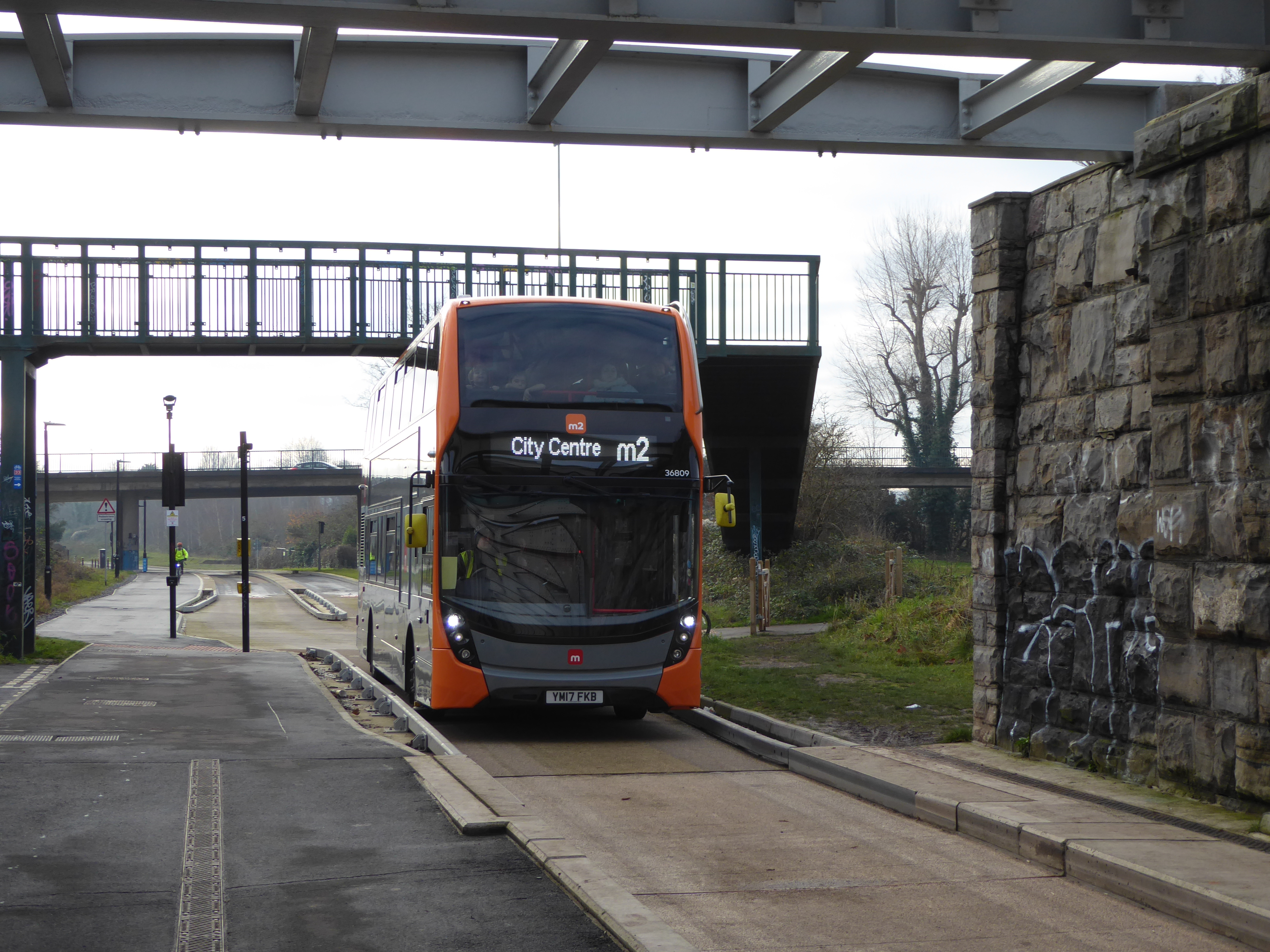
An m2 metrobus enters Ashton Avenue Bridge from south, 27 Dec 2018

MetroBus is part of a package of transport infrastructure improvements in the West of England which have been designed to help unlock economic growth, tackle poor public transport links in South Bristol, long bus journey times and high car use in the North Fringe of the city and M32 motorway corridor.

The system uses "buy before you board" ticketing and the services have a reduced number of stops. MetroBus vehicles have priority over other traffic at junctions and use a combination of segregated busways and bus lanes. A mixture of double-decker buses are used: line m2 uses Alexander Dennis Enviro400 MMC buses on diesel Scania N250UD chassis, while lines m1, m3 and m4 use Alexander Dennis Enviro400 City buses on compressed natural gas-powered Scania N280UD chassis. All buses have two doors, one for boarding and one for exiting, to shorten stop times.

There are five routes:

- m1: Cribbs Causeway to Hengrove Park via the city centre
- m2: Long Ashton park & ride to the city centre
- m3: Emersons Green and Lyde Green park & ride to The Centre, via the University of the West of England (UWE) Frenchay campus
- m3x: Emersons Green and Lyde Green park & ride to City Centre: faster peak time service along the same route as the m3 but omitting UWE Frenchay
- m4: Cribbs Causeway to City Centre, via Bristol Parkway Station and UWE Frenchay Campus

The South Bristol Link section, between Long Ashton park & ride and Hengrove Park, is not currently operated as no operator will run services without a subsidy. It is anticipated that when a large housing development is built near the route, the service will become commercially viable.

In central Bristol, The Centre was re-modelled and partly pedestrianised as part of the project. Many sections of the Metrobus routes also include a shared use path for multi-modal transport.

== History ==
The £200 million project started in 2006, developed by the West of England Partnership, a partnership between South Gloucestershire, Bristol and North Somerset and Bath and North East Somerset councils. Three routes were originally proposed:

- Ashton Vale to Temple Meads station (AVTM, later m2)
- North Fringe (as far as the Cribbs Causeway retail area) to Hengrove (NFHP, later m1)
- South Bristol Link (SBL, not in operation)

From its announcement, MetroBus (originally called 'BRT') proved controversial. In 2013 and 2014, incoming directly elected mayor George Ferguson decided to change the route of the Ashton Vale to Temple Meads service. Instead of travelling on the north side of Bristol Harbour along Hotwell Road or along the south side of the harbour and over Prince Street Bridge, it would follow Cumberland Road and Redcliff Hill calling near Temple Meads station and travelling around the inner ring road before reaching the city centre. This change would have implications for potential patronage: as the city centre was projected to be the most frequent destination, journey times for most passengers were significantly lengthened. As a result, the revised economic appraisal in 2014 projected significantly lower passenger numbers than the original appraisal in 2011.

An addition to the North Fringe package was proposed in 2015. The Cribbs Patchway MetroBus Extension (CPME) will provide a more direct route from Bristol Parkway railway station to Cribbs Causeway, via housing developments at Filton Airfield.

The scheme's promoters claimed in 2014 that it would reduce journey times by up to 75% between Long Ashton park & ride and Hengrove Park. In 2015, services were expected to begin in 2017, although this date subsequently slipped. The first route (m3) commenced on 29 May 2018. Route m2 commenced on 3 September 2018 and route m1 in January 2019.

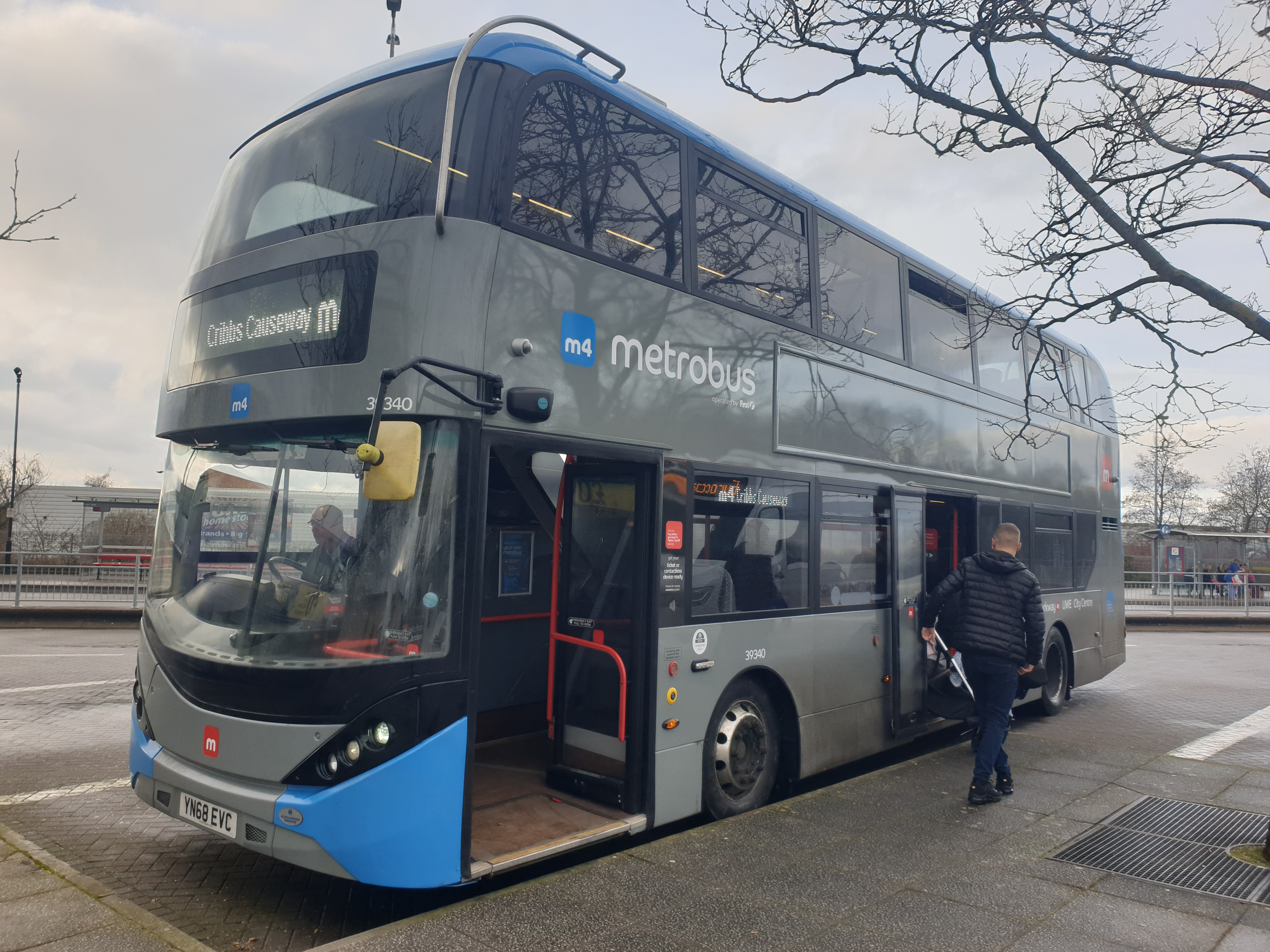
An m4 bus at Cribbs Causeway

In 2018, the m3 route was intended to be extended at a later date from Emersons Green to Bristol Parkway, following works at the station to improve access for buses and other vehicles. This plan was superseded by the m4 route, between the City Centre and Cribbs Causeway via Bristol Parkway station, which commenced in January 2023.

In 2025, the m2 route began running later in the evenings and a Sunday service was introduced, funded by a Section 106 agreement associated with developments in Wapping Wharf.

== Construction cost ==
The estimated cost of the scheme initially was £200 million. The Ashton Vale to Temple Meads route was £49.6 million, of which the Department for Transport (DfT) would contribute £34.5 million. DfT would contribute £27.6 million, more than half of the total cost, to the South Bristol Link Road scheme which extends the A4174 ring road, with Bristol City Council contributing £8.4 million and North Somerset Council £5.3 million. The cost of the North Fringe to Hengrove package was estimated to be £102 million, with DfT contributing £51 million, £30.5 million from South Gloucestershire Council and £20.5 million from Bristol City Council.

In 2016 estimated costs had increased to £216 million, and in 2017 to £230 million.

== Objections ==
MetroBus faced opposition from environmental groups who claimed the new bus-only junction over the M32 (North Fringe to Hengrove section) would mean the loss of 12 smallholdings, loss of long-held allotments, expansion into green belt land, and loss of Grade 1 soil and land at Feed Bristol, a community food-growing project. The scheme proposed mitigation for loss of allotments, soils etc. but a report to the Development Control Committee for the meeting of 27 August 2014 stated: "Despite the proposed off-site mitigation, the NFHP scheme would result in the loss of 1.79 hectares of best and most versatile agricultural land."

== Approval process ==
The Ashton Vale to Temple Meads route was approved by the DfT in November 2013. The South Bristol Link part of the MetroBus scheme was approved in January 2015.

== Construction ==
By April 2016, construction had begun on the first three routes. Works for the fourth route began in February 2019.

=== Ashton Vale to Temple Meads (AVTM) ===
Construction started in early 2015 on the Ashton Vale to Temple Meads route. Works for the Ashton Vale to Temple Meads MetroBus route include:

- construction of a total of 1 1/4 miles (2.0 kilometres) of guided busway (not continuous) from Long Ashton to the Ashton Avenue Bridge, together with a segregated path for cyclists and pedestrians,
- the refurbishment of Ashton Avenue Bridge,
- the construction of a new parallel bridge at Bathurst Basin, and
- city centre works including new bus stops, upgrading of existing stops and installation of real time information displays.

=== North Fringe to Hengrove (NFHP) ===
Work began on the Stoke Gifford Transport Link (SGTL) and Bradley Stoke Way in August 2015 as part of the North Fringe to Hengrove Package. The work includes the construction of new roads, widening the carriageway, a bus only junction on the M32 and the creation of new bus lanes on the A4174, Coldharbour Lane, Stoke Lane and SGTL.

The widening of the A4174 required the replacement of the Church Lane bridge for pedestrians and horses, near Emersons Green. The concrete bridge was demolished in December 2015 and replaced with a steel truss bridge in June 2016. Also in June 2016, the M32 was closed to allow the installation of a bus-only bridge.

=== South Bristol Link (SBL) ===
Work on this westward extension of the A4174 began in summer 2015 and involved the construction of:

- a new road with bus lanes from Highridge Common to the A370 Long Ashton Bypass,
- a new realigned road from Highridge Common to Hareclive Road,
- the new MetroBus route from Hengrove Park to Long Ashton Park & Ride, including a bus-only spur of about 700 metres connecting the new road to the park & ride site,
- a replacement railway bridge on the Bristol to Exeter line (a branch from the Great Western Main Line).

The South Bristol Link Road was completed and opened to traffic in early January 2017. The initial Metrobus network will not, however, run along the bus lanes of the Link Road, although the road is used by services between the city centre and Bristol Airport.

=== Cribbs Patchway MetroBus Extension (CPME) ===
A route to be known as 'm4', between the city centre and the Cribbs Causeway regional shopping centre, via Bristol Parkway and new housing built on the former Filton Airfield, began to be designed in 2014. Work to add short stretches of bus lane to existing roads, and replace Gipsy Patch Lane Bridge under the railway with a wider concrete bridge, began in 2019 and was largely complete in August 2022. Services on the m4 route began in January 2023.

== Operators ==
As of February 2017, an operator for MetroBus services had not been found. An operator should have been in place 12 months prior to commencement of services (planned for Spring 2017), but bus companies were reluctant to invest in new buses to meet the requirements for MetroBus, whilst having a cap on fares. They suggested that the services would not be viable on a commercial basis. MetroBus had said in 2016 that public subsidy might be needed to attract an operator.

In June 2017, it was announced that First West of England would run services on the first route to open – at that time expected to be the m2 from Long Ashton – and would not receive any public funding. In April 2018, it was announced that the m1 route would be operated by Bristol Community Transport, under contract to First West of England, with the m2 and m3 services operated by First.

HCT Group, the owners of Bristol Community Transport, announced at short notice in August 2022 that they would withdraw from the m1 service. First West of England took over the service after a two-day suspension.

== Future expansion ==
The West of England Combined Authority's Joint Local Transport Plan has outlined the ambition for future expansion of the MetroBus network to link Bristol city centre to Bath via Keynsham, Clevedon via Nailsea, Yate, Thornbury and Avonmouth; along with an orbital service linking Emersons Green to South Bristol. A service in Weston-super-Mare is also proposed.

In August 2021, Bristol City Council opened a consultation on extending the m1 route from Hengrove Park to Imperial Park via Hawkfield Road.

== Criticism ==
The current MetroBus network has shown signs of bus rapid transit creep; primarily not fully operating on dedicated bus lanes for much of its routes, operating in mixed road traffic and being subject to traffic jams.

In an open letter published in January 2020, James Freeman, the then managing director of First West of England, said services could not operate properly because buses were delayed by roadworks and congestion. He stated that the £230m of public money had been "largely wasted".

== See also ==
- MetroWest (Bristol) – rail services
- Transport in Bristol
