= North Fringe of Bristol =

Area of Bristol, England

Coordinates: 51.5254°N 2.56659°W

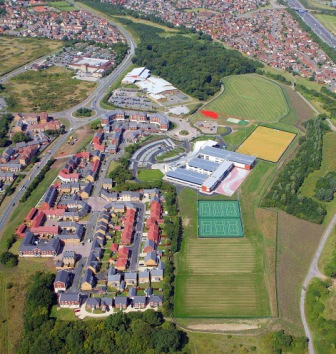
Aerial view of part of Bradley Stoke, within the North Fringe

The North Fringe of Bristol, England is a mostly developed area between the northern edge of the administrative city of Bristol and the M4 and M5 motorways. Its eastern edge is usually defined as the M32 motorway. The area falls within South Gloucestershire Council, and is the northern part of Greater Bristol.

== Development of the area ==
Before the motorways were built in the 1960s and 1970s, the area contained the suburban village and towns of Filton, Patchway and Stoke Gifford, together with Stoke Park Hospital. Bristol Parkway railway station was opened at Stoke Gifford in 1972. The University of the West of England (UWE) has its main campus in the area, near Frenchay in Stoke Gifford.

As a result of major pressures for development for housing, industry, offices and out-of-town shopping, the then local authority, Northavon District Council, prepared the North Fringe Local Plan for the area in 1987. This confirmed previous decisions in the Avon County Council structure plan, to remove land from the green belt at Patchway Common. The area was subsequently developed as the new settlement of Bradley Stoke. At around the same time, decisions were taken to develop major retail parks, and subsequently The Mall retail development, at Cribbs Causeway adjoining junction 17 of the M5.

The North Fringe area, because of its highly accessible location adjoining two major motorways and on the edge of the major population centre of Bristol, experienced very substantial growth in housing and, in particular, employment during the 1980s and 1990s, which is still continuing. The first major business park in the area was Aztec West, adjoining junction 16 of the M5. The North Fringe had over 67,000 jobs in 2001. It now has severe road traffic congestion problems, particularly on the main roads, the A4174 and A38, as well as the motorways themselves.

Developments immediately to the east of this area and the M32, for instance at Emersons Green, are sometimes referred to as the East Fringe of Bristol.

In October 2016, the MetroBus released plans to improve bus journey times to the area, with a route from Cribbs Causeway to Hengrove Park in south Bristol.
