= St Anne's Park railway station =

Former railway station in England

St Anne's Park
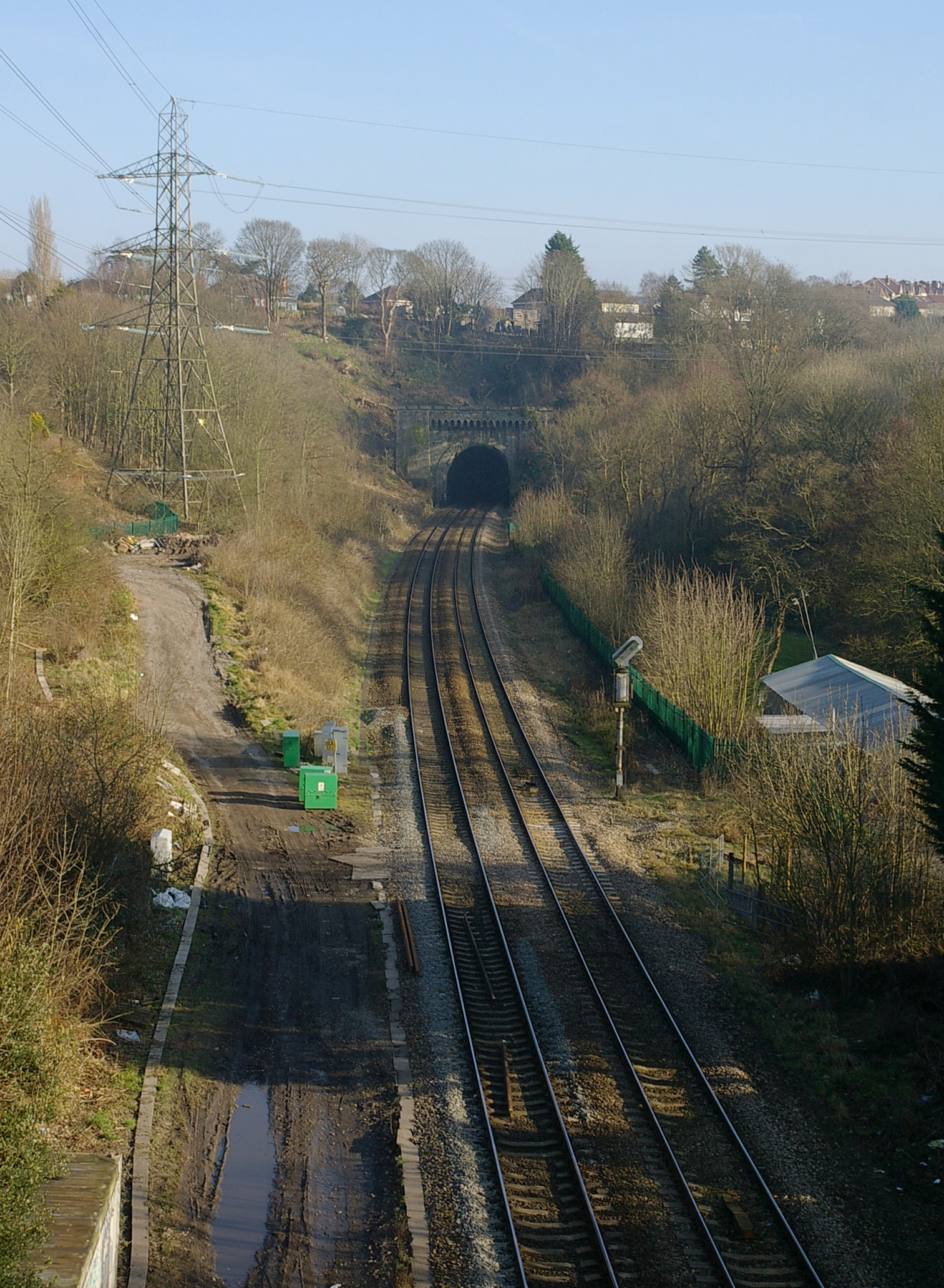
- The site of the station as it exists today.

General information
- Location: St Anne's, Bristol, City of Bristol; England
- Coordinates: 51.4470°N 2.5452°W
- Grid reference: ST622721
- Platforms: 2

Other information
- Status: Disused

History
- Original company: Great Western Railway
- Pre-grouping: Great Western Railway
- Post-grouping: Great Western Railway

Key dates
- 23 May 1898: Opened
- 5 January 1970: Closed
Location

St Anne's Park railway station was a railway station in Bristol, England, on the Great Western Main Line to London. It opened on 23 May 1898, and closed on 5 January 1970.

Recent proposals have been made for the station to reopen as part of the MetroWest project to improve rail transport in the Greater Bristol area. In November 2020, the government announced further funding to investigate reopening the station.

== Accidents and incidents ==
- On 11 January 1966, an express passenger train ran into the rear of another at St Anne's Park due to a signalman's error. A locomotive was then in a sidelong collision with the wreckage. Nineteen passengers were injured. Diesel-hydraulic locomotive D1071 Western Druid was severely damaged; D 864 Zambesi was slightly damaged.

Preceding station	Historical railways	Following station
Bristol Temple Meads	Great Western Railway; Great Western Main Line	Keynsham

St Anne's Park railway station, Bristol
