= A370 road =

Road in England

A370

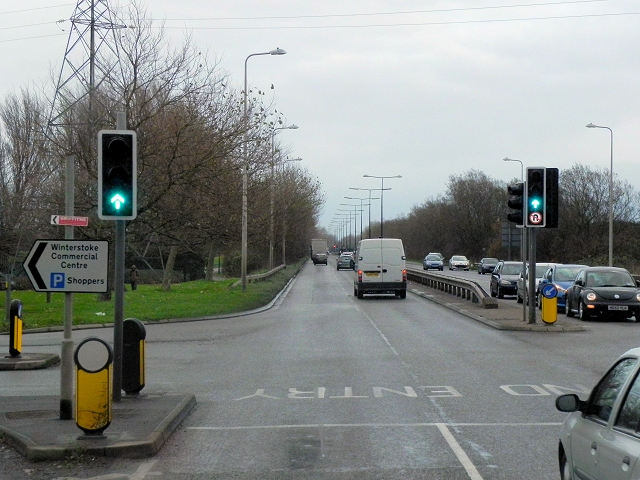
- The A370 Leaving Weston-super-Mare.

Major junctions
- From: Bristol
- M5; A4 A369 A371; A38
- To: East Brent

Location
- Country: United Kingdom

Road network
- Roads in the United Kingdom; Motorways; A and B road zones

The A370 is a primary road in England running from the A4 Bath Road, near Bristol Temple Meads railway station to Weston-super-Mare before continuing to the village of East Brent in Somerset. A more direct route from Bristol to East Brent is the A38.

== Route ==
Within Bristol urban area, the road begins at Bath Road roundabout, at the busy junction with A4 near Temple Meads. It then follows the new cut of River Avon west to Cumberland basin, via Bedminster.

From here on, it begins to head south-westwards out of the city. It first bypasses Long Ashton, then passes through Flax Bourton, Backwell, Brockley, Cleeve, Congresbury and Hewish, beyond which it crosses the M5 motorway at Junction 21.

A possible spur motorway, the South Bristol Spur Road, was contemplated, in the late 1960s, to extend the 1968 Long Ashton bypass, which had been built to a motorway standard, to the M5 junction. A public enquiry was held in April 1966. Avon council officially scrapped the whole scheme on 23 May 1979.

The road then enters Weston-super-Mare: a dual carriageway extends most of the way, by passing the built-up area, including Junction 21 Enterprise Area to the east of the town. Previously the route of the A370 passed through Worle. On reaching the waterfront, the road turns south to run partly along the beach, then leaves Weston at Uphill. It passes Bleadon and Lympsham before meeting the A38 road at East Brent.

== Construction ==
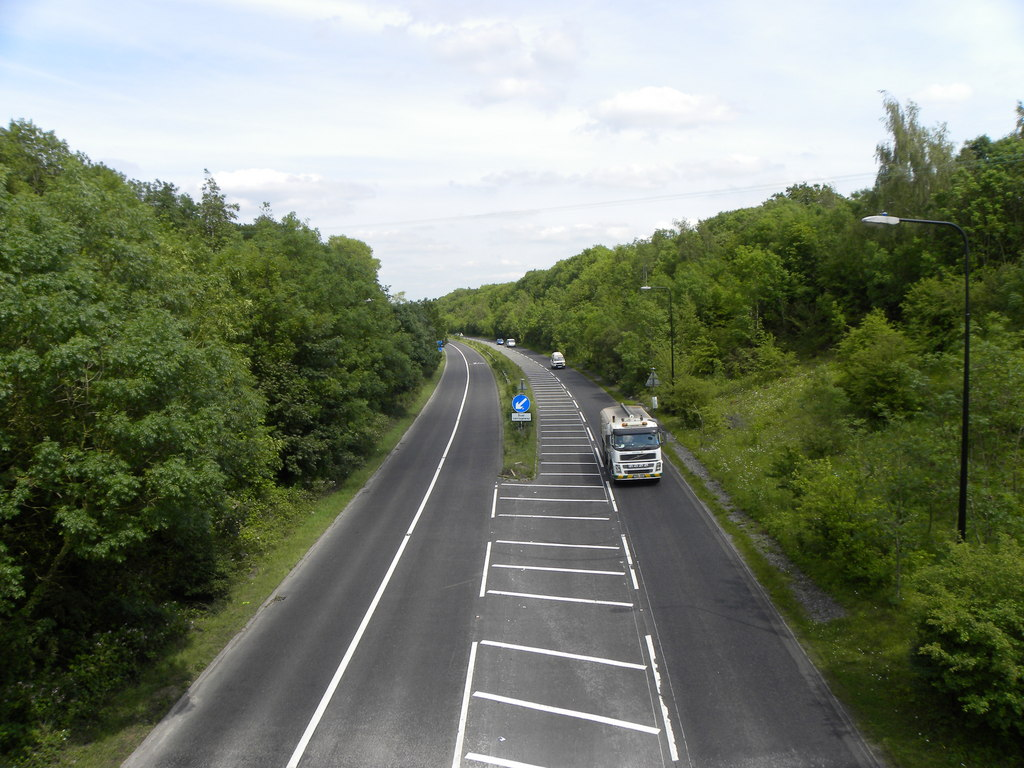
Long Ashton bypass in August 2011, three lanes of a single motorway carriageway from 1968, that was never dualled

For the 3.5 mile section from the Bristol boundary to Flax Bourton, which forms the Long Ashton bypass, the contract was awarded on 21 October 1966 to Hadsphaltic Construction, of Redhill in Surrey, for £1,211,664. Work started on 1 December 1966. It crossed the main railway at a viaduct at Yanley.

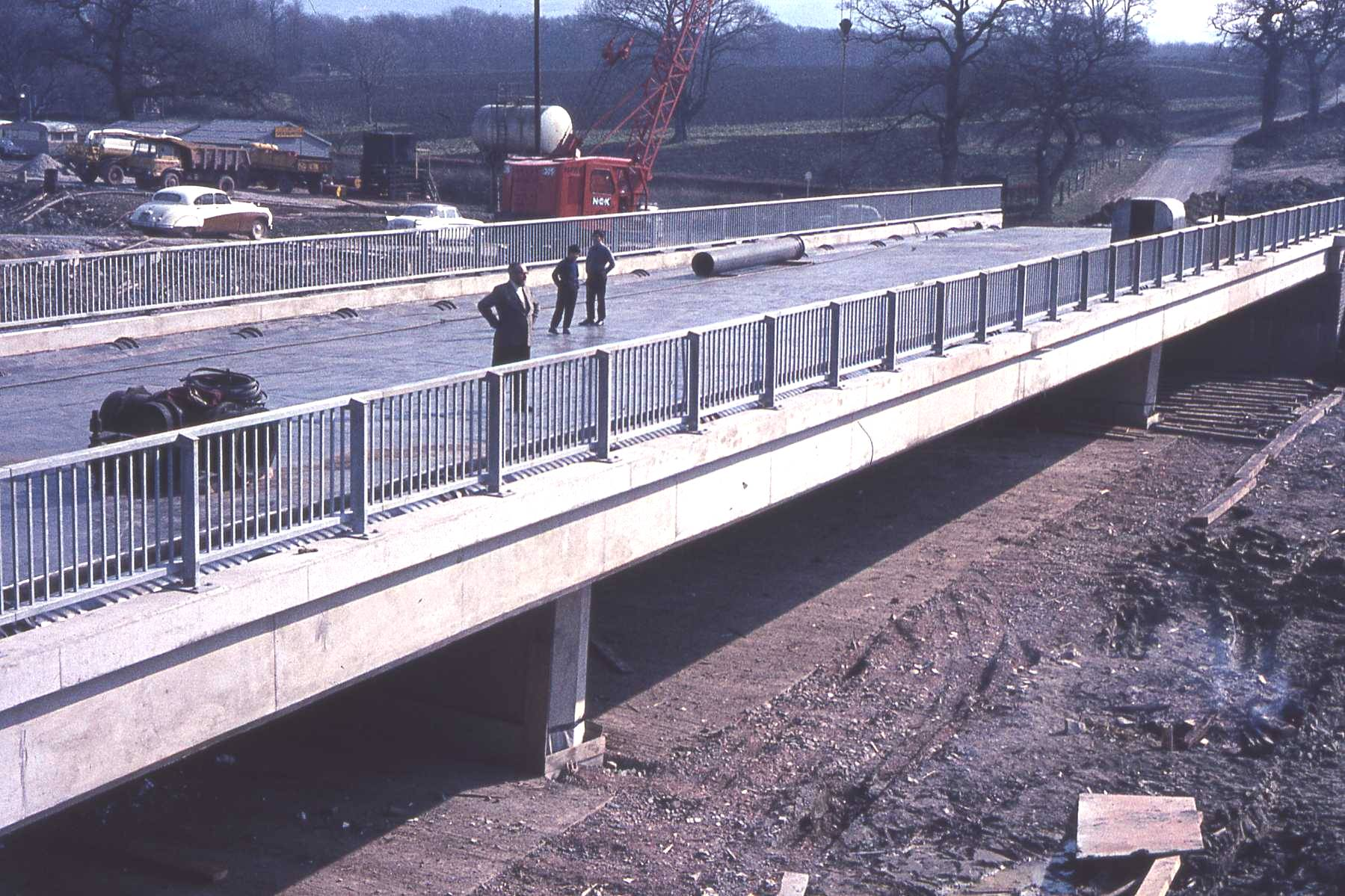
Long Ashton bypass under construction in February 1968

The Long Ashton bypass opened on the afternoon of 6 December 1968, being opened by chairman of the parish council, at the Bristol end at 3.30pm, originally planned for 2.15pm. It had three lanes, to be planned to later form a dual carriageway. The bypass was designed to motorway standards, to form one carriageway of a possible motorway, towards the M5.

== Condition ==
The A370 can get extremely busy during rush hour. Congestion points include the approaches to the M5 motorway, the traffic lights in Congresbury and the Long Ashton bypass—which now has a bus lane solely for use by buses and taxis, replacing the former high-occupancy vehicle lane.

== Future ==
As part of the "Greater Bristol Strategic Transport Study", a link road was under consideration to the south of Bristol. This is in part due to the congestion at Winterstoke Road and Barrow Gurney, both of which are very busy, especially the latter where the road can only accommodate travelling at one direction at a given time); and the incomplete Bristol Ring Road (A4174).

In 2017, the A370 Long Ashton By Pass was connected to the South Bristol Link (SBL) road, as part of the MetroBus rapid transit scheme, providing a new road linking Hengrove to Long Ashton By Pass and the Long Ashton Park & Ride. This follows much of the intended route for the Bristol Ring Road and carries the designation A4174, the same as the built section of ring road.

== Points of interest ==
Point	Coordinates (Links to map resources)	OS Grid Ref	Notes
Bristol	51.4473°N 2.5822°W	ST596721	Bristol
M5 junction 21	51.3588°N 2.8935°W	ST378625	Intersection with M5 motorway
East Brent	51.2578°N 2.9332°W	ST349513	East Brent, Somerset
