= A4174 road =

Road in Bristol

Coordinates: 51.50308°N 2.51497°W

A4174

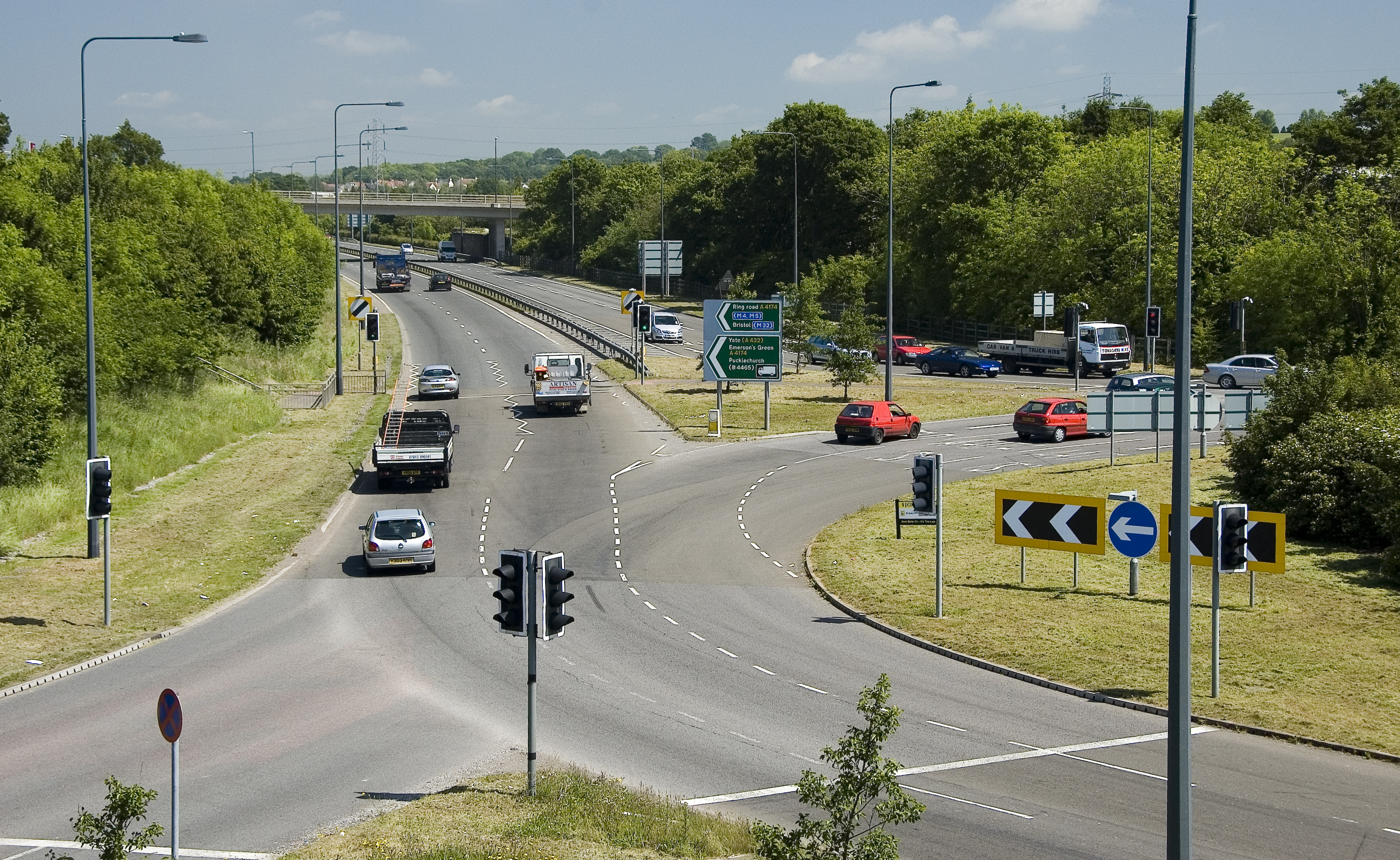
- Signalised roundabout with the A4175 at Siston Common

Major junctions
- From: Filton
- A38 M32 A4017 A432 A4175 A420 A431; A4; A37; A38
- To: Bedminster

Location
- Country: United Kingdom

Road network
- Roads in the United Kingdom; Motorways; A and B road zones
← A4173	→ A4175

The A4174 is a major ring road in England which runs around the northern and eastern edge of Bristol, mainly in South Gloucestershire, and through the southern suburbs of the city. When it was first conceived it was planned to circle the whole of Bristol, and is commonly referred to as the "Avon Ring Road", or less accurately the "Bristol Ring Road", on road signs. The road does not circle the whole city, instead covering roughly half of the route. It is broken in part where it is concurrent with the A4.

== Route ==
The road was conceived in the 1980s by Avon County Council, and the route of the initial section, east of Bristol, was selected by 1986. The road was built progressively in a number of sections, over an extended period of time.

The completed section of the northern and eastern route runs from the A38 at Filton, under the M32 motorway, through to Frenchay, Bromley Heath, Emersons Green, Kingswood, Warmley, and Longwell Green before joining the A4 at Hicks Gate junction near Keynsham. This section of the road is entirely dual carriageway and runs through several roundabouts with local routes. Many of these roundabouts formerly experienced long queues, but since 2005, most have been signalised, resulting in reduced congestion. The junction with the M32 motorway still experiences long delays despite the introduction of traffic lights.

The road reappears 1.3 miles (2.1 km) along the A4 at Brislington, where it follows a valley, crosses the A37, and reaches a large roundabout in Hengrove Park some 2 1/2 miles (4.0 km) south of the city centre. Here the road turns north, terminating at the A38 in Bedminster. A further section of the southern ring, the South Bristol Link Road, was opened in January 2017 and connects Hartcliffe (west of Hengrove Park) with the A370 near Long Ashton.

A section of the dual carriageway south of Mangotsfield occupies the alignment of the former Mangotsfield and Bath branch line which closed in 1966. This railway was largely converted to the Bristol and Bath Railway Path, part of National Cycle Route 4, which runs alongside this section of the ring road.

In 2021 the Wraxall Road roundabout was converted into a throughabout (hamburger roundabout), with a new six-lane route through the centre of the roundabout, intended to reduce congestion and accidents.

== Future plans ==
There have been several proposals to extend the ring road from the junction with the A4 at Hicks Gate, Keynsham, along the southern edge of Bristol as far as the A370 at Long Ashton. From there a complete loop could be achieved by following the A4, the M5 and M4.

The 2005 Greater Bristol Strategic Transport Study, commissioned by the regional government office, recommended construction of the new southern route to tackle congestion. The proposals follow the route set aside west from Hengrove Park roundabout to the A38 at Castle Farm (phase 1), and from there to the A370 near Long Ashton Park and Ride (phase 2). There are additional recommendations (phase 3) for a new Whitchurch bypass from Hengrove Park roundabout, along the base of Dundry Hill, around Stockwood and joining the existing A4174 at Hicks Gate roundabout on the A4. Phase one and two of the ring road are the only major road building schemes adopted by the Joint Local Transport Plan, which claimed they would reduce delays across the Greater Bristol area by 6%, and lead to a 9% increase in public transport use. Bristol City Council has endorsed all three phases, and was hoping to begin construction of the first two phases in 2010 and 2011, and the third phase some time after 2016.

In December 2015, construction began on widening sections of the ring road between the junction with the M32 and Wick Wick Roundabout, to create new bus lanes for MetroBus as part of its North Fringe to Hengrove route package. The works included replacement of the Church Lane foot/horse bridge.

In July 2016, outline plans to build a direct road from the A4 Hicks Gate roundabout to the large roundabout in Hengrove Park, obviating the use of the A4 to bridge this "missing link", were scrapped. This outline plan had blighted homes on the possible route for a number of years.

In 2021, South Gloucestershire council proposed a £30 million scheme of road-widening and other improvements, including converting three more roundabouts to throughabouts (hamburger roundabouts), which would take three years of works. A public consultation elicited 84% opposition to the plan, with objections including the long period of traffic disruption and that no bus lanes would be created, and consequently the council postponed its bid for government money for further consideration.
