= Hengrove =

Coordinates: 51.4160°N 2.5918°W

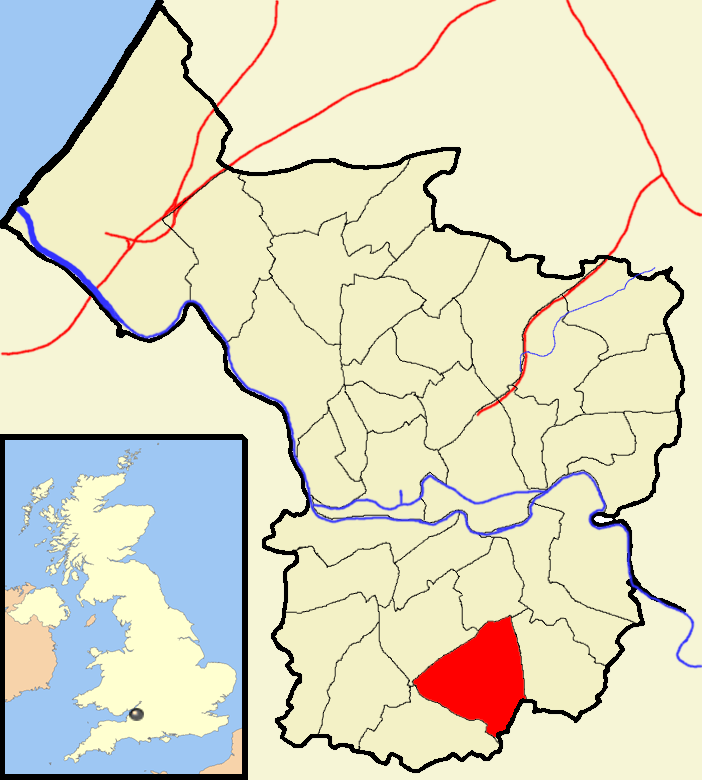
- Boundaries of the city council ward.

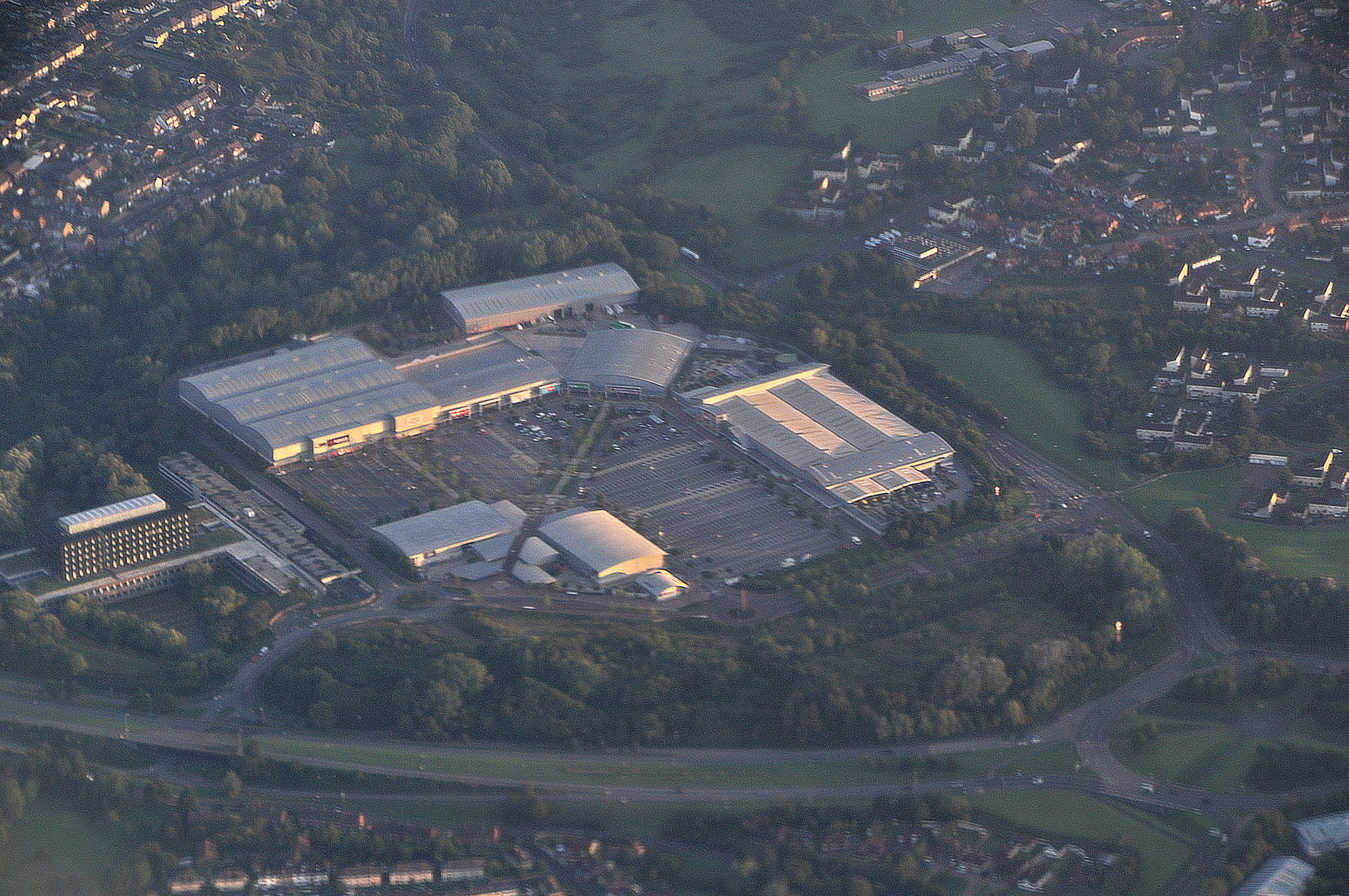
- Imperial Park
- Population: 11,723 {2011.Ward
- OS grid reference: ST589687
- Unitary authority: Bristol
- Ceremonial county: Bristol
- Region: South West
- Country: England
- Sovereign state: United Kingdom
- Post town: BRISTOL
- Postcode district: BS14
- Dialling code: 0117
- Police: Avon and Somerset
- Fire: Avon
- Ambulance: South Western
- UK Parliament: Bristol South

Hengrove is a suburb and council ward of Bristol, England, situated between Whitchurch, Knowle and Bishopsworth, running along both dual carriageways, Wells Road (A37) and Airport Road (A4174). The area of Knowle it adjoins is known as Knowle West.

The residential parts of Hengrove consist mainly of working to middle class terrace houses. There are also infant, primary and secondary schools in the area. It is served by buses and, since 2019, MetroBus rapid transit services.

Hengrove holds the long-disused Whitchurch Airport, which has mostly been redeveloped with a hospital and leisure facilities now situated on parts of the former airfield.

== Hengrove Leisure Park ==
Hengrove Leisure Park is located on Hengrove Way and is an out-of-town leisure park containing branches of restaurant and fast food chains, along with a hotel, cinema and bingo hall. There is also a children's play park, the largest in Bristol, and skate park adjoining the site. In 2021, plans were approved to demolish most of the leisure park buildings in order to redevelop the site for housing.

== Hengrove Park ==
Hengrove Park is the largest urban regeneration site in Bristol and is built on part of the former airfield of the disused Whitchurch Airport. It is the site of South Bristol Community Hospital, Hengrove Park Leisure Centre, and Hengrove Skills Academy, and in 2001 was the temporary home to the Ashton Court Festival.

Hengrove Park is the southern terminus of MetroBus route m1.

== Sport ==
Hengrove is home to the non-League football club Hengrove Athletic F.C., who play at Norton Lane. Hengrove is also home to rugby union club Imperial RFC which play in the Somerset premier league.
