= Emersons Green =

Civil parish in Gloucestershire, England

Coordinates: 51.495°N 2.505°W

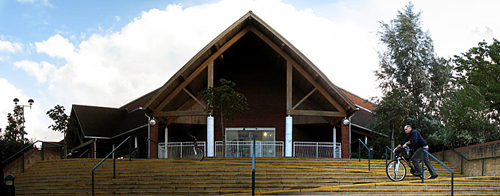
- Shopping facilities at Emersons Green

- Location within Gloucestershire
- Population: 17,317 (2021)
- OS grid reference: ST650774
- Civil parish: Emersons Green
- Unitary authority: South Gloucestershire
- Ceremonial county: Gloucestershire
- Region: South West
- Country: England
- Sovereign state: United Kingdom
- Post town: Bristol
- Postcode district: BS16
- Dialling code: 0117
- Police: Avon and Somerset
- Fire: Avon
- Ambulance: South Western
- UK Parliament: Filton and Bradley Stoke
- Website: Town Council

Emersons Green (Emerson's Green on Ordnance Survey maps) is a suburban neighbourhood and civil parish in the South Gloucestershire district, of the county of Gloucestershire, England. It is part of the Greater Bristol area, and is 7 miles (11 km) northeast of Bristol city centre. The parish had a population of 17,317 at the 2021 census.

== History ==
Coal was mined in the area in the 19th century. To the south there is a quarry, which has been reactivated.

The neighbourhood was developed in the 1990s and early 21st century on farmland formerly in the parish of Mangotsfield.

A science and technology park, in conjunction with Bristol University and University of the West of England, has been built on an area of land adjacent to the M4 motorway and the A4174 ring road.

== Governance ==
Emersons Green was until 1927 a hamlet in the civil parish of Mangotsfield. From 1927 to 2015, it was in the civil parish of Mangotsfield Rural. The parish was renamed Emersons Green in 2015 and enlarged by the addition of areas of the civil parishes of Pucklechurch and Westerleigh, taking in the housing development at Lyde Green and the science park.

The parish council elected to be known as Emersons Green Town Council. The parish has four wards: Badminton, Blackhorse and Pomphrey wards each elect three councillors, and Emersons Green ward – which also covers Lyde Green – elects seven councillors.

For elections to South Gloucestershire Council, the Emersons Green ward has almost the same boundaries as the parish and elects three councillors. For Westminster elections, the parish is part of the Filton and Bradley Stoke constituency.

== Lyde Green ==
Lyde Green is a development to the east of Emerson's Green that was originally farmland. Its transformation into housing began in the mid-2010s.

== Demographics ==
Census population of Emersons Green parish
Census	Population	Female	Male	Households	Source
2001	9,732	4,880	4,852	4,086	
2011	12,439	6,277	6,162	4,921	
2021	17,317	8,936	8,381	6,799	
