= 2005 Bristol City Council election =

2005 UK local government election

- 5 May 2005

23 of 70 seats (One Third) to Bristol City Council 36 seats needed for a majority

	Majority party	Minority party	Third party
Leader	Barbara Janke	Peter Hammond	Peter Abraham
Party	Liberal Democrats	Labour	Conservative
Leader since	15 May 1997	3 May 2003	14 January 1999
Leader's seat	Clifton	Southmead	Stoke Bishop
Last election	28	31	11
Seats before	7	14	2
Seats won	11	10	2
Seats after	32	27	11
Seat change	▲4	▼4	Steady
Popular vote	42,063	36,740	27,430
Percentage	35.9%	31.3%	23.4%
Swing	▲2.8%	▼5.0%	▼1.1%
	Fourth party
Party	Green
Last election	0
Seats before	0
Seats won	0
Seats after	0
Seat change	Steady
Popular vote	9,469
Percentage	8.1%
Swing	▲2.5%
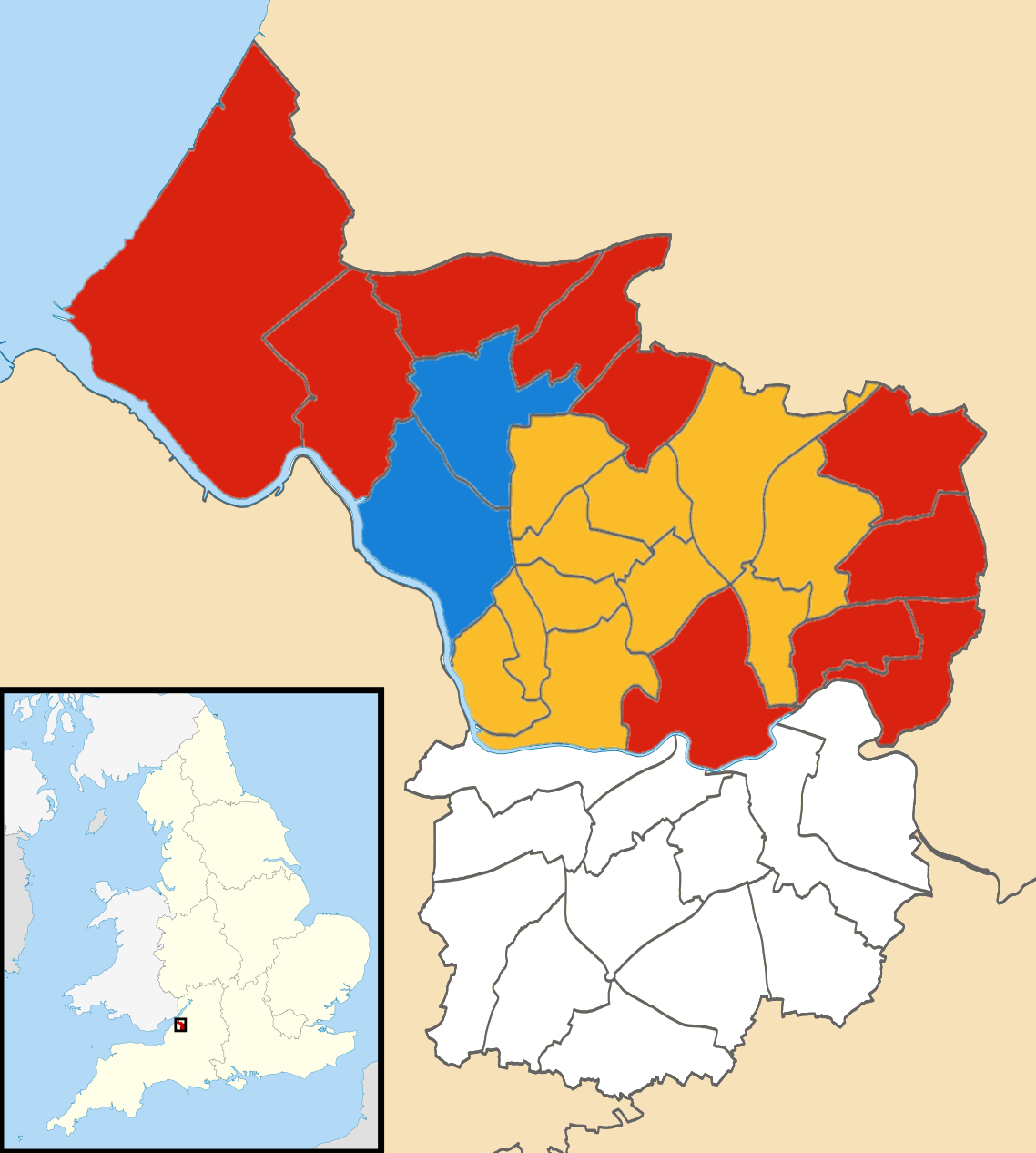
- 2005 local election results in Bristol
Council Leader before election before election
Peter Hammond
Labour
Council Leader after election
Barbara Janke
Liberal Democrats

The 2005 Bristol City Council election took place on 5 May 2005, on the same day as other local elections. The Liberal Democrats made a number of gains and became the largest party on the Council, for the first time, but failed to gain enough seats to form an overall majority.

== Background ==
Following the 2003 election, there was a month of dissuasions as to who would run the council before all three parties agreed to a cabinet of three Lib Dems, three Labour and two Conservative councillors, led by Lib Dem leader Barbara Janke.

On 13 October 2004 Labour leader Peter Hammond announced that they would be tabling a vote of no confidence in Janke, in relation to her role in the selection of now former councillor John Astley who had been convicted, in separate trials, of offences involving child pornography and electoral fraud. Hammond said "She [Janke] has indicated very clearly in public questions that she basically accepts no responsibility on behalf of her party for what happened. That, we think, is unacceptable."

On 28 October following the failure of the no confidence vote, the three Labour cabinet members, Hammond, Robin Moss and Helen Holland resigned. The Conservative group leader Peter Abraham told the BBC "This is a foolish, irresponsible move by the Labour Party. It is politics at its very worst, I'm ashamed of politicians who behave like this." In a council meeting on 9 November Hammond was voted in as council leader heading up a Labour minority administration.

== Previous composition ==
=== 2003 election ===
Party	Seats
Labour	31
Liberal Democrats	28
Conservative	11
Total	70

=== Composition of council seats before election ===
Party	Seats
Labour	31
Liberal Democrats	27
Conservative	11
Independent	1
Total	70

== Summary ==
The four seat swing from Labour marked the first time since 1983 that they had failed to be largest party on the council.

=== Election result ===
2005 Bristol City Council election
Party	This election				Full council			This election		
Party	Candidates	Seats	Net	Seats %	Other	Total	Total %	Votes	Votes %	+/−
Liberal Democrats	23	11	▲4	47.8	21	32	45.7	42,063	35.9	▲2.8
Labour	23	10	▼4	43.5	17	27	38.6	36,740	31.3	▼5.0
Conservative	23	2	Steady	8.7	9	11	15.7	27,430	23.4	▼1.1
Green	19	0	Steady	0.0	0	0	0.0	9,469	8.1	▲2.5
Independent	7	0	Steady	0.0	0	0	0.0	1,531	1.3	▲1.2
Socialist	1	0	Steady	0.0	0	0	0.0	59	0.1	▼0.2
Total	96	23	Steady		47	70		117,292		

Popular vote
Liberal Democrats	35.86%
Labour	31.32%
Conservative	23.39%
Green	8.07%
Other	1.36%

Council seats
Liberal Democrats	47.83%
Labour	43.48%
Conservative	8.70%

Bristol City Council composition following the 2005 election

=== Election of Group Leaders ===
Barbara Janke (Clifton) was re-elected leader of the Liberal Democrats group with Simon Cook (Clifton East) as her deputy, Helen Holland (Whitchurch Park) was elected leader of the Labour Group and Richard Eddy (Bishopsworth) was elected leader of the Conservative group.

== Government Formation ==
Barbara Janke the leader of the Liberal Democrats group was duly elected leader of the council and formed a minority administration.

== Ward results ==
Swings are compared to the 2001 election when these seats were last contested.

=== Ashley ===
Ashley
Party	Candidate	Votes	%	±%
Liberal Democrats	Jon Rogers	2,203	40.41	
Labour	Simony Crew	1,728	31.69	
Green	David Simpson	1,233	22.62	
Conservative	Adam Tayler	288	5.28	
Majority				
Rejected ballots				
Turnout				
Registered electors				
Liberal Democrats gain from Labour		Swing		

=== Avonmouth ===
Avonmouth
Party	Candidate	Votes	%	±%
Labour	Terence Cook	2,522	47.14	
Conservative	Christopher Windows	1,406	26.28	
Liberal Democrats	David Wheeler	1,111	20.77	
Independent	Stephen Norman	311	5.81	
Majority				
Rejected ballots				
Turnout				
Registered electors				
Labour hold		Swing		

=== Bishopston ===
Bishopston
Party	Candidate	Votes	%	±%
Liberal Democrats	Beverley Knott *	2,743	45.75	
Labour	Gerald Rosenberg	1,662	27.72	
Green	Martin Harvey	806	13.44	
Conservative	Jonathan Thorne	784	13.08	
Majority				
Rejected ballots				
Turnout				
Registered electors				
Liberal Democrats hold		Swing		

=== Cabot ===
Cabot
Party	Candidate	Votes	%	±%
Liberal Democrats	Mark Wright	1,893	43.12	
Labour	Lucy Jenkins	857	19.52	
Conservative	Iain Dennis	758	17.27	
Green	Christopher Gittins	511	11.64	
Independent	Victor Tallis *	371	8.45	
Majority				
Rejected ballots				
Turnout				
Registered electors				
Liberal Democrats hold		Swing		

=== Clifton ===
Clifton
Party	Candidate	Votes	%	±%
Liberal Democrats	Brian Price *	2,397	45.80	
Conservative	Kevin Allen	1,217	23.25	
Labour	Faruk Choudhury	1,017	19.43	
Green	Tony Gosling	536	10.24	
Independent	Christopher Morrall	67	1.28	
Majority				
Rejected ballots				
Turnout				
Registered electors				
Liberal Democrats hold		Swing		

=== Clifton East ===
Clifton East
Party	Candidate	Votes	%	±%
Liberal Democrats	Simon Cook *	2,037	45.31	
Conservative	Michael Popham	1,173	26.09	
Labour	Carolyn Manuel	727	16.17	
Green	Alan Clarke	559	12.43	
Majority				
Rejected ballots				
Turnout				
Registered electors				
Liberal Democrats hold		Swing		

=== Cotham ===
Cotham
Party	Candidate	Votes	%	±%
Liberal Democrats	Barrington Dodd *	2,406	45.76	
Labour	Karin Smyth	1,091	20.75	
Conservative	Nicholas Shatti	912	17.34	
Green	Geoff Collard	849	16.15	
Majority				
Rejected ballots				
Turnout				
Registered electors				
Liberal Democrats hold		Swing		

=== Easton ===
Easton
Party	Candidate	Votes	%	±%
Liberal Democrats	Abdul Malik	2,169	43.62	
Labour	Robin Moss *	1,707	34.33	
Green	Jon Lucas	796	16.01	
Conservative	Seva Singh	301	6.05	
Majority				
Rejected ballots				
Turnout				
Registered electors				
Liberal Democrats gain from Labour		Swing		

=== Eastville ===
Eastville
Party	Candidate	Votes	%	±%
Liberal Democrats	Steve Comer	2,249	44.32	
Labour	Brian Mead	1,557	30.68	
Conservative	Colin Bretherton	772	15.21	
Green	Martin Cottingham	387	7.63	
Independent	Anthony Locke	110	2.17	
Majority				
Rejected ballots				
Turnout				
Registered electors				
Liberal Democrats gain from Labour		Swing		

=== Frome Vale ===
Frome Vale
Party	Candidate	Votes	%	±%
Labour	William Payne	1,881	37.20	
Conservative	Margaret Coombe	1,820	36.00	
Liberal Democrats	Josephine Carpenter	1,042	20.61	
Green	Peter Goodwin	313	6.19	
Majority				
Rejected ballots				
Turnout				
Registered electors				
Labour hold		Swing		

=== Henbury ===
Henbury
Party	Candidate	Votes	%	±%
Labour	Derek Pickup	2,017	45.40	
Conservative	Roy Pepworth	1,397	31.44	
Liberal Democrats	Paul Townsend	1,029	23.16	
Majority				
Rejected ballots				
Turnout				
Registered electors				
Labour hold		Swing		

=== Henleaze ===
Henleaze
Party	Candidate	Votes	%	±%
Liberal Democrats	Dennis Brown *	3,445	53.86	
Conservative	Derek Fey	1,795	28.06	
Labour	Judith Sluglett	823	12.87	
Green	John Hills	333	5.21	
Majority				
Rejected ballots				
Turnout				
Registered electors				
Liberal Democrats hold		Swing		

=== Hillfields ===
Hillfields
Party	Candidate	Votes	%	±%
Labour	Noreen Daniels	2,475	46.49	
Liberal Democrats	John Hassell	1,504	28.25	
Conservative	Malcolm Lake	1,073	20.15	
Green	Graham Davey	272	5.11	
Majority				
Rejected ballots				
Turnout				
Registered electors				
Labour hold		Swing		

=== Horfield ===
Horfield
Party	Candidate	Votes	%	±%
Labour	Rosalie Walker *	1,887	37.79	
Conservative	Anthony Smith	1,543	30.90	
Liberal Democrats	Neil Harrison	1,230	24.63	
Green	Daniella Radice	334	6.69	
Majority				
Rejected ballots				
Turnout				
Registered electors				
Labour hold		Swing		

=== Kingsweston ===
Kingsweston
Party	Candidate	Votes	%	±%
Labour	Judith Price *	1,556	34.90	
Liberal Democrats	Joanna Prescott	1,532	34.37	
Conservative	Michael Cobb	941	21.11	
Independent	Terence Thomas	429	9.62	
Majority				
Rejected ballots				
Turnout				
Registered electors				
Labour hold		Swing		

=== Lawrence Hill ===
Lawrence Hill
Party	Candidate	Votes	%	±%
Labour	Brenda Hugill *	1,935	46.60	
Liberal Democrats	Fi Hance	1,492	35.93	
Conservative	Richard Manns	384	9.25	
Green	Michael Crawford	341	8.21	
Majority				
Rejected ballots				
Turnout				
Registered electors				
Labour hold		Swing		

=== Lockleaze ===
Lockleaze
Party	Candidate	Votes	%	±%
Liberal Democrats	Emma Bagley	1,880	45.28	
Labour	Kerry Barker	1,542	37.14	
Conservative	Kevin Quartley	488	11.75	
Green	Christina Quinnell	183	4.41	
Socialist	Roger Thomas	59	1.42	
Majority				
Rejected ballots				
Turnout				
Registered electors				
Liberal Democrats gain from Labour		Swing		

=== Redland ===
Redland
Party	Candidate	Votes	%	±%
Liberal Democrats	James White	2,493	42.95	
Conservative	Douglas Newton	1,292	22.26	
Labour	Malcolm Patterson	1,191	20.52	
Green	Lela McTernan	828	14.27	
Majority				
Rejected ballots				
Turnout				
Registered electors				
Liberal Democrats hold		Swing		

=== Southmead ===
Southmead
Party	Candidate	Votes	%	±%
Labour	Peter Hammond *	2,106	51.80	
Conservative	Joe Long	946	23.27	
Liberal Democrats	Gerard Smith	771	18.96	
Independent	Andrew Richardson	243	5.98	
Majority				
Rejected ballots				
Turnout				
Registered electors				
Labour hold		Swing		

=== St George East ===
St George East
Party	Candidate	Votes	%	±%
Labour	Charles Price *	2,401	44.72	
Conservative	Matthew Denyer	1,439	26.80	
Liberal Democrats	Paul Elvin	1,223	22.78	
Green	Christine Prior	306	5.70	
Majority				
Rejected ballots				
Turnout				
Registered electors				
Labour hold		Swing		

=== St George West ===
St George West
Party	Candidate	Votes	%	±%
Labour	Ronald Stone *	2,218	46.90	
Liberal Democrats	Anthony Potter	1,311	27.72	
Conservative	Alexander Culley	871	18.42	
Green	Samantha Pullinger	329	6.96	
Majority				
Rejected ballots				
Turnout				
Registered electors				
Labour hold		Swing		

=== Stoke Bishop ===
Stoke Bishop
Party	Candidate	Votes	%	±%
Conservative	Peter Abraham *	2,903	48.53	
Liberal Democrats	Saleh Ahmed	1,912	31.96	
Labour	Dianne Manning	758	12.67	
Green	Keith Wiltshire	409	6.84	
Majority				
Rejected ballots				
Turnout				
Registered electors				
Conservative hold		Swing		

=== Westbury-on-Trym ===
Westbury-on-Trym
Party	Candidate	Votes	%	±%
Conservative	Geoff Gollop *	2,927	46.26	
Liberal Democrats	Trevor Blythe	1,991	31.47	
Labour	Gillian Kirk	1,082	17.10	
Green	Donald Brown	327	5.17	
Majority				
Rejected ballots				
Turnout				
Registered electors				
Conservative hold		Swing		
