= 2006 Bristol City Council election =

2006 UK local government election

- 4 May 2006

23 of 70 seats (One Third) to Bristol City Council 36 seats needed for a majority

	Majority party	Minority party	Third party
Leader	Barbara Janke	Helen Holland	Richard Eddy
Party	Liberal Democrats	Labour	Conservative
Leader since	15 May 1997	May 2005	May 2005
Leader's seat	Clifton	Whitchurch Park	Bishopsworth
Last election	32	27	11
Seats before	8	9	6
Seats won	9	5	8
Seats after	33	23	13
Seat change	▲1	▼4	▲2
Popular vote	20,740	19,607	22,493
Percentage	28.3%	26.8%	30.7%
Swing	▼4.1%	▼3.6%	▲1.1%
	Fourth party
Party	Green
Last election	0
Seats before	0
Seats won	1
Seats after	1
Seat change	▲1
Popular vote	9,437
Percentage	12.9%
Swing	▲7.7%
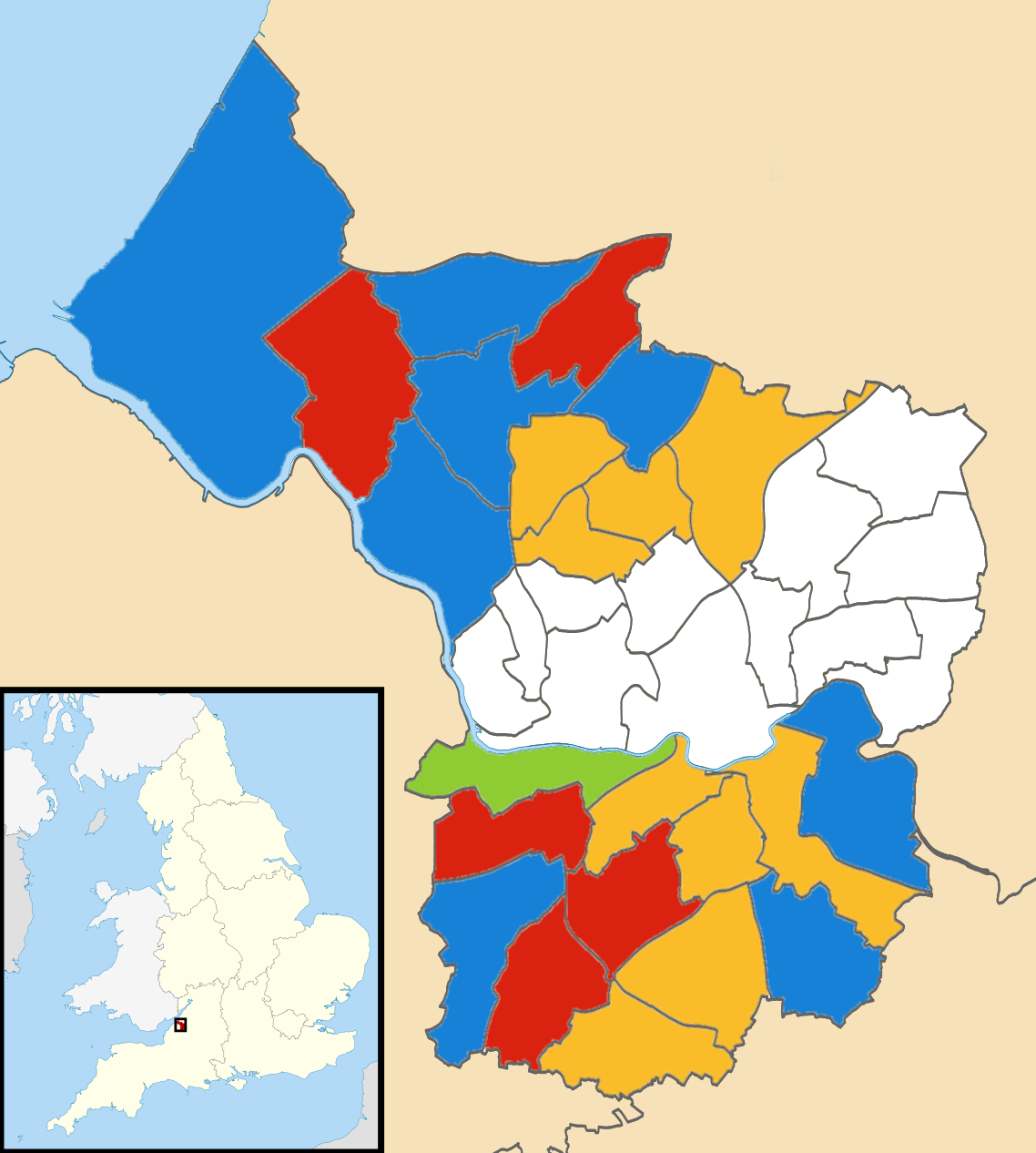
- 2006 local election results in Bristol
Council Leader before election before election
Barbara Janke
Liberal Democrats
Council Leader after election
Barbara Janke
Liberal Democrats

The 2006 Bristol City Council election took place on 4 May 2006, on the same day as other local elections. The Labour Party continued to lose seats, but the Liberal Democrats failed to gain enough to form an overall majority. This election saw the first election of a Green Councillor to Bristol City Council – the first time four parties had been represented since the Council’s creation.

== Previous composition ==
=== 2005 election ===
Party	Seats
Liberal Democrats	32
Labour	27
Conservative	11
Total	70

== Summary ==
=== Election result ===
2006 Bristol City Council election
Party	This election				Full council			This election		
Party	Candidates	Seats	Net	Seats %	Other	Total	Total %	Votes	Votes %	+/−
Liberal Democrats	23	9	▲1	39.1	24	33	47.1	20,740	28.3	▼4.1
Conservative	23	8	▲2	34.8	5	13	18.6	22,493	30.7	▲1.1
Labour	23	5	▼4	21.7	18	23	32.9	19,607	26.8	▼3.6
Green	23	1	▲1	4.3	0	1	1.4	9,437	12.9	▲7.7
Respect	1	0	Steady	0.0	0	0	0.0	679	0.9	N/a
English Democrat	1	0	Steady	0.0	0	0	0.0	221	0.3	N/a
Total	94	23	Steady		48	70		73,177		

Popular vote
Conservative	30.74%
Liberal Democrats	28.34%
Labour	26.79%
Green	12.90%
Other	1.23%

Council seats
Liberal Democrats	39.13%
Conservative	34.78%
Labour	21.74%
Green	4.35%

Bristol City Council composition following the 2006 election

=== Election of Group Leaders ===
Barbara Janke (Clifton) was re-elected leader of the Liberal Democrats group with Steve Comer (Eastville) as her deputy, Helen Holland (Whitchurch Park) was re-elected leader of the Labour Group and Richard Eddy (Bishopsworth) was elected leader of the Conservative group.

== Government Formation ==
Barbara Janke the leader of the Liberal Democrats group was duly elected leader of the council and formed a minority administration.

== Ward results ==
Swings are compared to the 2002 election when these seats were last contested.

=== Avonmouth ===
Avonmouth
Party	Candidate	Votes	%	±%
Conservative	Spud Murphy	1,694	48.25	
Labour	Karin Smyth	1,306	37.20	
Green	Donald Brown	257	7.32	
Liberal Democrats	David Anthony Wheeler	254	7.23	
Majority				
Rejected ballots				
Turnout				
Registered electors				
Conservative hold		Swing		

=== Bedminster ===
Bedminster 2006
Party	Candidate	Votes	%
Labour	Mark Bradshaw	1,267	39.82
Conservative	Douglas John Newton	777	24.42
Green	Clodagh Anne Scott	640	20.11
Liberal Democrats	Matthew James Cox	498	15.65
Majority			
Labour hold			

=== Bishopston ===
Bishopston 2006
Party	Candidate	Votes	%
Liberal Democrats	David John Gordon Kitson	1,420	42.07
Green	Martin Harry Harvey	818	24.24
Labour	Gerald Rosenberg	649	19.23
Conservative	Jonathan Arthur Thorne	488	14.46
Majority			
Liberal Democrats hold			

=== Bishopsworth ===
Bishopsworth 2006
Party	Candidate	Votes	%
Conservative	Kevin Michael Quartley	1,482	51.66
Labour	Dean James Machin	750	26.14
Green	Barrie Robert Lewis	411	14.33
Liberal Democrats	Hugh Richard Bond	226	7.88
Majority			
Conservative hold			

=== Brislington East ===
Brislington East 2006
Party	Candidate	Votes	%
Conservative	Barbara Madeleine Lewis	1,359	42.91
Labour	Simon Mark Geoffrey Crew	1,140	36.00
Liberal Democrats	Benjamin Charles Heatley	359	11.34
Green	Ruth Elizabeth Cormack	309	9.76
Majority			
Conservative gain from Labour			

=== Brislingon West ===
Brislington West 2006
Party	Candidate	Votes	%
Liberal Democrats	Peter Henry Main	1,026	37.34
Conservative	Colin Robert Bretherton	700	25.47
Labour	Fabian Guy Breckels	589	21.43
Green	David Kevin Naismith	433	15.76
Majority			
Liberal Democrats hold			

=== Filwood ===
Filwood 2006
Party	Candidate	Votes	%
Labour	Christopher David Jackson	1,255	52.34
Liberal Democrats	Ann Marjorie Cooper	776	32.36
Conservative	Jonathan Robert Hucker	223	9.30
Green	Xavier Panades I Blas	144	6.01
Majority			
Labour gain from Liberal Democrats			

=== Hartcliffe ===
Hartcliffe 2006
Party	Candidate	Votes	%
Labour	Royston Alan Griffey	1,250	44.84
Conservative	Nicola Louise Crandon	1,071	38.41
Liberal Democrats	Linda Kynoch Hopkins	261	9.36
Green	Melissa Dunlop	206	7.39
Majority			
Labour hold			

=== Henbury ===
Henbury 2006
Party	Candidate	Votes	%
Conservative	Mark David Roscoe Weston	1,190	40.64
Labour	Claire Louise Cook	1,056	36.07
Liberal Democrats	Saleh Ahmed	451	15.40
Green	Christopher John Gittins	231	7.89
Majority			
Conservative gain from Labour			

=== Hengrove ===
Hengrove 2006
Party	Candidate	Votes	%
Liberal Democrats	Mary Sykes	1,082	36.44
Conservative	Adam Beda Tayler	1,013	34.12
Labour	Busharat Ali	588	19.80
Green	Tess Green	286	9.63
Majority			
Liberal Democrats hold			

=== Henleaze ===
Henleaze 2006
Party	Candidate	Votes	%
Liberal Democrats	Clare Campion-Smith	2,016	50.93
Conservative	Christopher John Windows	1,284	32.44
Green	John Mark Hills	378	9.55
Labour	Judith Mary Sluglett	280	7.07
Majority			
Liberal Democrats hold			

=== Horfield ===
Horfield 2006
Party	Candidate	Votes	%
Conservative	Martin Kerry	1,361	37.91
Liberal Democrats	Neil Robert Harrison	1,342	37.38
Labour	David Ian Jepson	646	17.99
Green	Daniella Elsa Radice	241	6.71
Majority			
Conservative hold			

=== Kingsweston ===
Kingsweston 2006
Party	Candidate	Votes	%
Labour	John Thomas Bees	1,078	36.36
Liberal Democrats	Joanna Lesley Prescott	1,040	35.08
Conservative	Anthony James Smith	614	20.71
Green	Geoff Collard	233	7.86
Majority			
Labour hold			

=== Knowle ===
Knowle 2006
Party	Candidate	Votes	%
Liberal Democrats	Gary Hopkins	1,452	46.91
Labour	Ricky Orlando Nelson	651	21.03
Conservative	James Andrew Hale Stevenson	558	18.03
Green	Graham Hugh Davey	434	14.02
Majority			
Liberal Democrats hold			

=== Lockleaze ===
Lockleaze 2006
Party	Candidate	Votes	%
Liberal Democrats	Sean Clifford Emmett	1,091	40.21
Respect	Jerry Hicks	679	25.03
Labour	Gregory Maurice Green	554	20.42
Green	Christina Mary Quinnell	251	9.25
Conservative	Richard James Manns	138	5.09
Majority			
Liberal Democrats hold			

=== Redland ===
Redland 2006
Party	Candidate	Votes	%
Liberal Democrats	Sylvia Jeanne Townsend	1,329	40.04
Conservative	Julian Wyndham Alexander Strong	872	26.27
Green	David Michael Joseph	693	20.88
Labour	Faruk Ahmed Choudhury	425	12.81
Majority			
Liberal Democrats hold			

=== Southmead ===
Southmead 2006
Party	Candidate	Votes	%
Labour	Jenny Smith	1,039	45.81
Conservative	Joe Long	465	20.50
Liberal Democrats	Gerard Christopher Mark Smith	414	18.25
English Democrat	Michael Thomas Martin Blundell	221	9.74
Green	Lela Helen McTernan	129	5.69
Majority			
Labour hold			

=== Southville ===
Southville 2006
Party	Candidate	Votes	%
Green	Charles Nicholas Bolton	1,439	40.60
Labour	Matthew Symonds	1,432	40.41
Conservative	Jonathan Heyes	377	10.64
Liberal Democrats	Matthew John Greenwood	296	8.35
Majority			
Green gain from Labour			

=== Stockwood ===
Stockwood 2006
Party	Candidate	Votes	%
Conservative	David Henry Robert Morris	1,670	53.20
Labour	Brian Peter Mead	671	21.38
Green	Peter Anthony Goodwin	436	13.89
Liberal Democrats	Paul Elvin	362	11.53
Majority			
Conservative hold			

=== Stoke Bishop ===
Stoke Bishop 2006
Party	Candidate	Votes	%
Conservative	John Goulandris	2,269	64.22
Liberal Democrats	Alexander William Woodman	642	18.17
Labour	Dianne Elizabeth Manning	319	9.03
Green	Keith Vivian Wiltshire	303	8.58
Majority			
Conservative hold			

=== Westbury-on-Trym ===
Westbury-on-Trym 2006
Party	Candidate	Votes	%
Conservative	Ashley Peter Fox	2,319	52.01
Liberal Democrats	Michael Henry Popham	1,505	33.75
Green	Alex Dunn	331	7.42
Labour	Annia Summers	304	6.82
Majority			
Conservative hold			

=== Whitchurch Park ===
Whitchurch Park 2006
Party	Candidate	Votes	%
Liberal Democrats	Timothy Rodney Kent	1,421	45.65
Labour	Colin John Smith	1,244	39.96
Conservative	Roy David Pepworth	279	8.96
Green	Mary Elizabeth Thomson	169	5.43
Majority			
Liberal Democrats gain from Labour			

=== Windmill Hill ===
Windmill Hill 2006
Party	Candidate	Votes	%
Liberal Democrats	Alf Havvock	1,477	41.65
Labour	Christopher Louis Orlik	1,114	31.42
Green	Stephen Petter	665	18.75
Conservative	Graham David Morris	290	8.18
Majority			
Liberal Democrats gain from Labour			
