= 2012 Bristol mayoral election =

Local election in England

- 15 November 2012
- Turnout: 27.92%
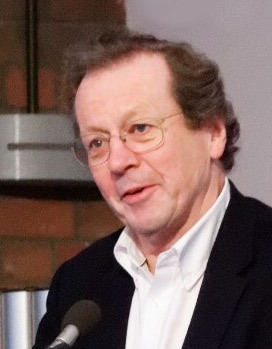

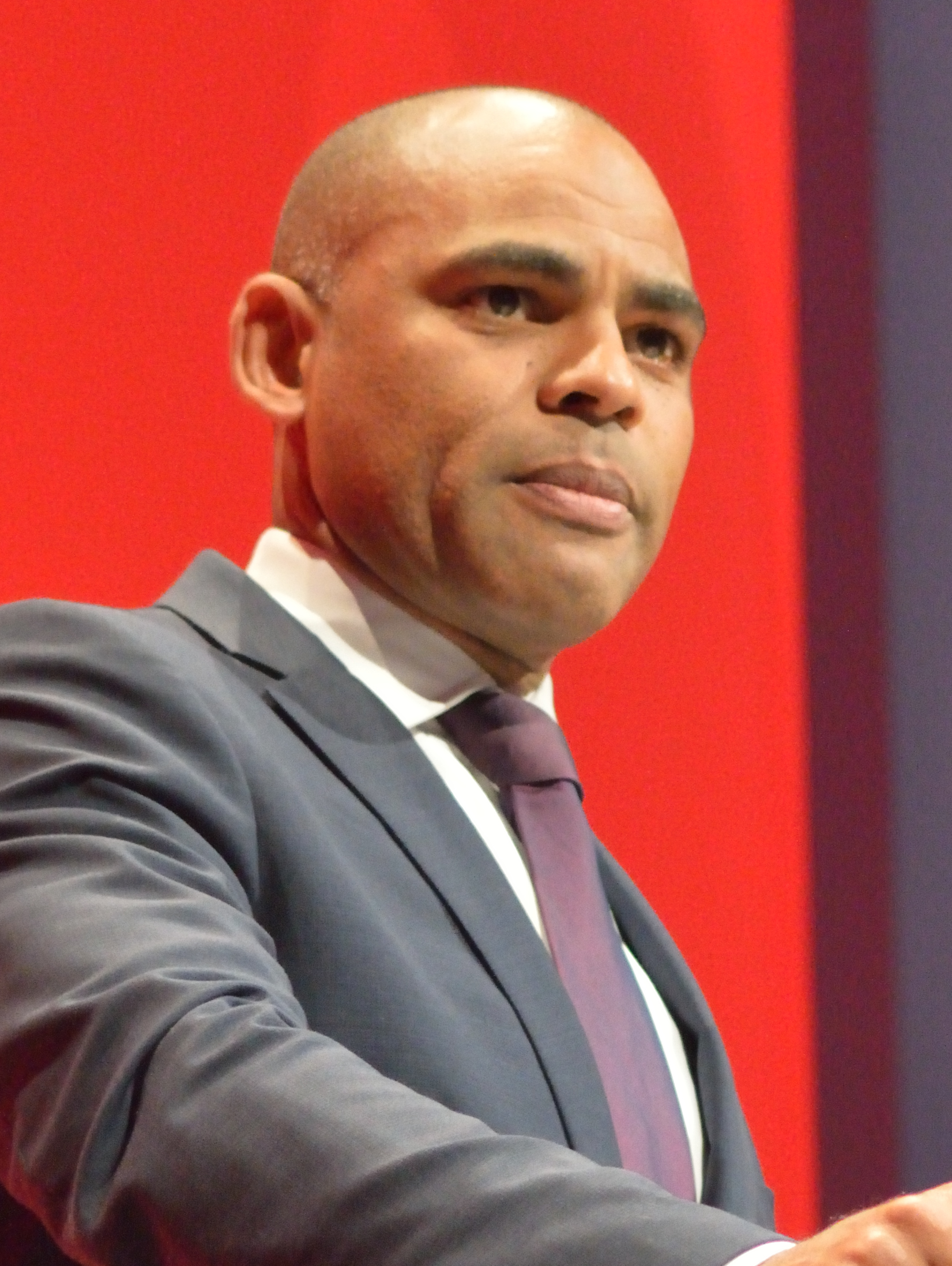

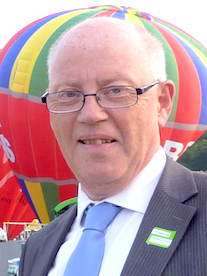

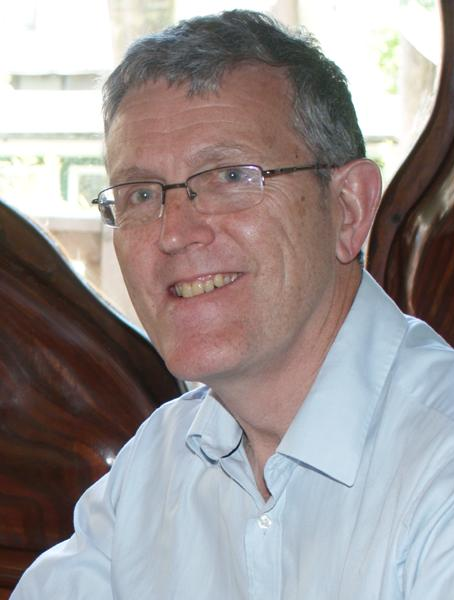
Candidate	George Ferguson	Marvin Rees	Geoff Gollop
Party	Bristol 1st	Labour	Conservative
1st Round	31,321	25,896	8,136
Percentage	35.1%	29.1%	9.1%
2nd Round	37,353	31,259	Eliminated
Percentage	54.4%	45.6%	Eliminated
		Grn
Candidate	Jon Rogers	Daniella Radice
Party	Liberal Democrats	Green
1st Round	6,202	5,248
Percentage	7.0%	5.9%
2nd Round	Eliminated	Eliminated
Percentage	Eliminated	Eliminated
Mayor before election
New office
Elected Mayor
George Ferguson
Bristol 1st

The 2012 Bristol mayoral election was an election held on 15 November 2012, to elect the Mayor of Bristol. It was the first Mayoral election held following the approval of a Mayoral system in a referendum in May 2012. It was won by Bristol 1st candidate George Ferguson.

== Background ==
The Local Government Act 2000 required local authorities in the United Kingdom to move from the traditional committee-based system of decision making to one based on an executive, also allowing the possibility of a directly elected mayor. The first directly elected mayor was in Greater London in 2000. Others followed in other authorities, including Hartlepool, Middlesbrough, Tower Hamlets, Liverpool and Salford.

Following the passage of The City of Bristol (Mayoral Referendum) Order 2012 by the United Kingdom Parliament in February 2012, a referendum was announced for 3 May 2012. Nine other cities also held referendums on the same day: Birmingham, Bradford, Coventry, Leeds, Manchester, Newcastle upon Tyne, Nottingham, Sheffield and Wakefield. In addition, Doncaster Borough Council voted to hold a referendum on the same day to decide whether or not to retain their existing elected mayoral system, having been one of the earliest authorities to adopt the mayoral system in 2001.

Campaigning groups supporting (A Mayor for Bristol) and opposing (Bristol Says No!) an elected mayor were established. A debate organised by the University of Bristol took place in the Council House on 22 February 2012.

The result, declared on 4 May 2012 by returning officer Stephen McNamara, was in favour of creating the position. Bristol was the only one of the ten cities voting that day to choose having an elected mayor.

== Candidates ==
=== Labour ===
==== Nominee ====
- Marvin Rees, former broadcast journalist and party activist

==== Shortlisted candidates ====
- Kelvin Blake, former City Councillor for Filwood
- Peter Hammond, City Council group leader, former City Council leader and City Councillor for Southmead
- Helen Holland, former City Council leader and City Councillor for Whitchurch Park
- Dan Norris, former Member of Parliament for Wansdyke and former City Councillor for Brislington West

=== Liberal Democrats ===
==== Nominee ====
- Jon Rogers, City Council Deputy leader, City Councillor for Ashley and retired GP

==== Shortlisted candidates ====
- Simon Cook, City Council leader and City Councillor for Clifton East

==== Potential candidates ====
- Abdul Malik, businessman and former City Councillor for Easton
- Stephen Williams, Member of Parliament for Bristol West and former City Councillor for Cabot

=== Conservative ===
==== Nominee ====
- Geoff Gollop, former City Council group leader and City Councillor for Westbury-on-Trym

==== Shortlisted candidates ====
- Peter Abrahams, City Council group leader, former City Council Deputy leader and City Councillor for Stoke Bishop
- Barbara Lewis, former City Councillor for Brislington East

=== Green ===
==== Nominee ====
- Daniella Radice, former energy consultant and candidate for City Council in 2007 and 2009

==== Shortlisted candidates ====
Three unnamed candidates

=== Bristol 1st ===
==== Nominee ====
- George Ferguson, former architect, entrepreneur, former Liberal City Councillor for Cabot and candidate for Bristol West in 1983 & 1987

=== Others ===
- Tom Baldwin (TUSC), part-time Socialist Party organiser
- Tony Britt (Independent), former landscape gardener
- Tim Collins (Independent), former Labour Avon County councillor and retired planning consultant
- Dave Dobbs (Birthday Party), political activist, puppeteer and writer
- Rich Fisher (Independent), unemployed
- Stoney Garnett (Independent), retired postman
- Owain George (Independent), pub landlord
- Neil Maggs (Respect), accountant and school bursar
- Spud Murphy (Independent), former Conservative City Councillor for Avonmouth
- Philip Pover (Independent), IT consultant

==== Withdrawn ====
- Craig Clarke (Independent)

== Campaign ==
Shortly after beginning his campaign, Ferguson was hit with accusations of "political expediency" for quitting the Liberal Democrats in order to enter as an independent. Darren Lewis, chair of Bristol Labour Party, told the The Bristol Post "To me and a lot of others, it seems the only reason he chose to resign was due to political expediency. He stayed with the Liberal Democrat party when they were riding high in the polls, he stayed with them through thick and thin – until, in fact, he decided to stand for public office. The only reason that made him resign was simply because he knew the Liberal Democrats are not going to win this election." Ferguson responded "Everyone knows that I am my own person. I'm a member of lots of things but I'm as independent as they come. These remarks are typical example of playing the party game and I am not prepared to do that."

During a September question and answer session both Ferguson and Rogers stated their opposition to a proposed £150 million expansion of Bristol Airport while Rees and Gollop spoke in favour of the plans.

During the final week of the campaign, Simon Woolley director of Operation Black Vote told The Voice if Rees was elected it would be an "Obama moment" as he would the first directly elected Mayor of African descent across Europe. He also said that "Symbolically this too is a very big deal. Marvin stands before the people of Bristol to represent all its citizens fairly and honestly, but he could have stood before its citizens some 280 years ago as commercial chattel, or, crudely put, as a slave. Because from 1730-1745 Bristol was the main slave port for the UK."

By election day, Rees was the 1 to 4 favourite to win with Ferguson at 5 to 1, Rogers at 6 to 1 and Gollop at 25 to 1.

== Voting system ==
The election used a supplementary vote system, in which voters express a first and a second preference of candidates.

- If a candidate receives over 50% of the first preference vote the candidate wins.
- If no candidate receives an overall majority, i.e., over 50% of first preference votes, the top two candidates proceed to a second round and all other candidates are eliminated.
- The first preference votes for the remaining two candidates stand in the final count.
- Voters' ballots whose first and second preference candidates are eliminated are discarded.
- Voters whose first preference candidates have been eliminated and whose second preference candidate is in the top two have their second preference votes added to the count.

This means that the winning candidate has the support of a majority of voters who expressed a preference among the top two.

== Result ==
On election night, Ferguson would defeat Rees 54.4% to 45.6% becoming the first directly elected Mayor of Bristol.

Bristol Mayoral election 15 November 2012
Party	Candidate	1st round		2nd round			1st round votesTransfer votes, 2nd round
Party	Candidate	Total	Of round	Transfers	Total	Of round	1st round votesTransfer votes, 2nd round
Bristol 1st	George Ferguson	31,321	35.13%	6,032	37,353	54.44%	
Labour	Marvin Rees	25,896	29.05%	5,363	31,259	45.56%	
Conservative	Geoff Gollop	8,136	9.13%				
Liberal Democrats	Jon Rogers	6,202	6.96%				
Green	Daniella Radice	5,248	5.89%				
Independent	Owain George	2,404	2.70%				
Independent	Spud Murphy	1,855	2.08%				
Respect	Neil Maggs	1,568	1.76%				
Independent	Stoney Garnett	1,413	1.58%				
TUSC	Tom Baldwin	1,412	1.58%				
Independent	Tim Collins	1,037	1.16%				
Independent	Philip Pover	994	1.11%				
Independent	Tony Britt	761	0.85%				
Independent	Rich Fisher	494	0.55%				
The Birthday Party	Dave Dobbs	411	0.46%				
Turnout		90,273	27.92				
Registered electors		323,310					
Bristol 1st win							

By Constituency (1st Round)

Constituency	George Ferguson (Bristol 1st)		Marvin Rees (Labour)		Geoff Gollop (Conservative)		Jon Rogers (Liberal Democrats)		Daniella Radice (Green)		Owain George Independent		Spud Murphy Independent		Neil Maggs (Respect)		Tom Baldwin (TUSC)		Others		Total	
Constituency	Votes	%	Votes	%	Votes	%	Votes	%	Votes	%	Votes	%	Votes	%	Votes	%	Votes	%	Votes	%	Votes	%
Bristol East	4,021	26.07%	5,392	34.96%	1,492	9.67%	966	6.26%	671	4.35%	486	3.15%	376	2.44%	374	2.42%	311	2.02%	1,089	7.06%	15,423	
Bristol North West	7,033	35.83%	5,003	25.49%	2,594	13.22%	1,408	7.17%	771	3.93%	512	2.61%	556	2.83%	250	1.27%	240	1.22%	993	5.06%	19,628	
Bristol South	9,178	36.49%	6,930	27.55%	2,087	8.30%	1,569	6.24%	1,173	4.66%	818	3.25%	466	1.85%	505	2.01%	408	1.62%	1,690	6.72%	25,151	
Bristol West	11,043	46.49%	8,531	35.92%	1,945	8.19%	2,246	9.46%	2,622	11.04%	587	2.47%	453	1.91%	433	1.82%	447	1.88%	1,322	5.57%	30,068	
Totals	31,321	34.70%	25,896	28.69%	8,136	9.01%	6,202	6.87%	5,248	5.81%	2,404	2.66%	1,855	2.05%	1,568	1.74%	1,412	1.56%	5,110	5.66%	90,273	27.92%

By Constituency (2nd Round)

Constituency	George Ferguson (Bristol 1st)		Marvin Rees (Labour)	
Constituency	Votes	%	Votes	%
Bristol East	4,901	43.69%	6,317	56.31%
Bristol North West	8,485	58.48%	6,025	41.52%
Bristol South	10,725	56.31%	8,320	43.69%
Bristol West	13,194	55.55%	10,557	44.45%
Totals	37,353	54.44%	31,259	45.56%
