= 2007 Bristol City Council election =

2007 UK local government election

- 3 May 2007

25 of 70 seats (One Third) to Bristol City Council 36 seats needed for a majority
- Registered: 206,085
- Turnout: 33.98%

	Majority party	Minority party	Third party
Leader	Barbara Janke	Helen Holland	Richard Eddy
Party	Liberal Democrats	Labour	Conservative
Leader since	15 May 1997	May 2005	May 2005
Leader's seat	Clifton	Whitchurch Park	Bishopsworth
Last election	33	23	13
Seats before	14	8	3
Seats won	12	10	3
Seats after	31	25	13
Seat change	▼2	▲2	Steady
Popular vote	18,705	21,059	17,668
Percentage	26.8%	30.1%	25.3%
Swing	▼7.5%	▲1.8%	▲2.2%
	Fourth party
Leader	Charles Bolton
Party	Green
Leader since	4 May 2006
Leader's seat	Southville
Last election	1
Seats before	0
Seats won	0
Seats after	1
Seat change	Steady
Popular vote	9,816
Percentage	14.0%
Swing	▲7.1%
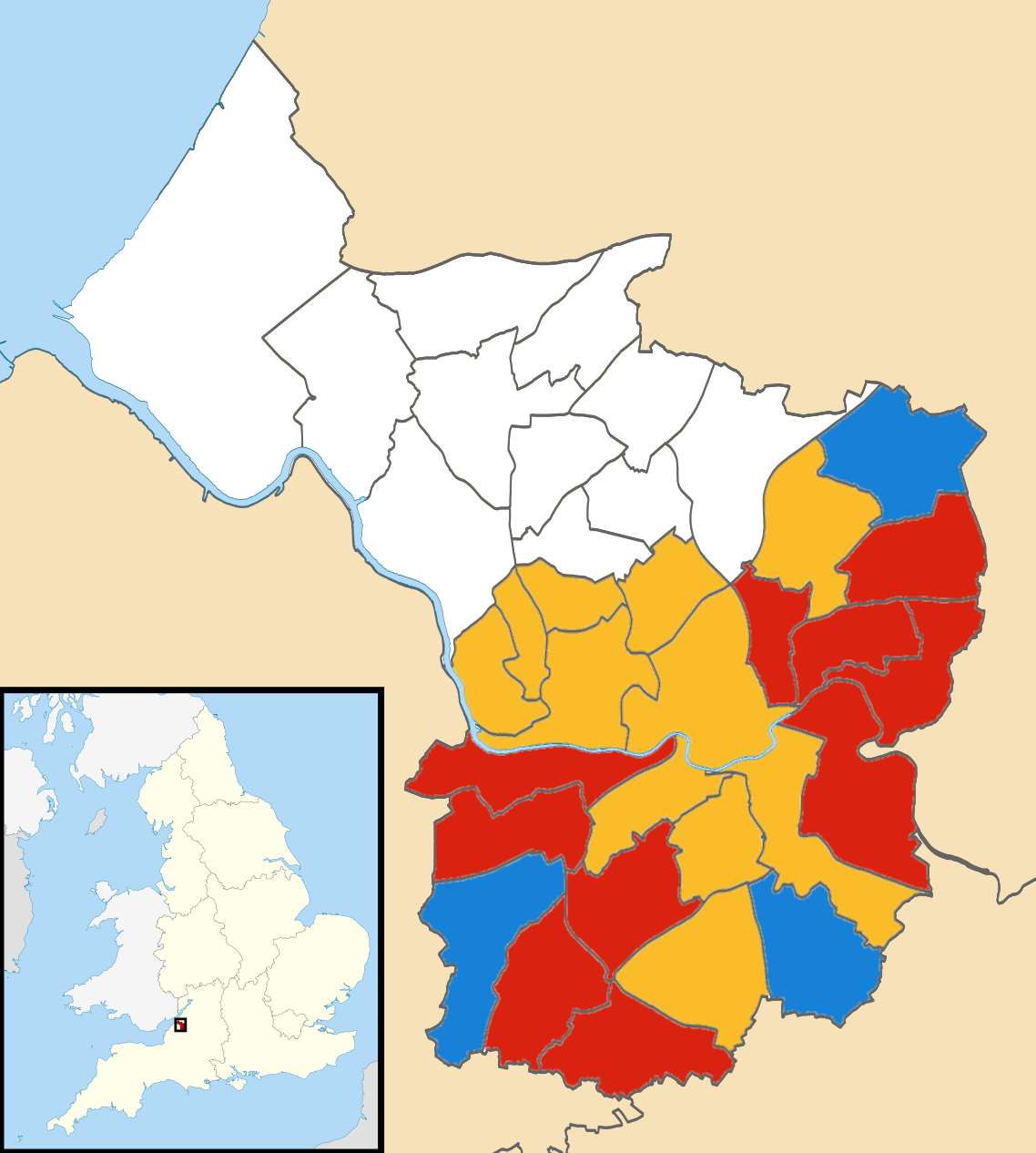
- 2007 local election results in Bristol
Council Leader before election before election
Barbara Janke
Liberal Democrats
Council Leader after election
Helen Holland
Labour

The 2007 Bristol City Council election took place on 3 May 2007, on the same day as other local elections. The Liberal Democrats lost two seats to Labour, but remained the largest party on the Council. No party gained overall control.

== Previous composition ==
=== 2006 election ===
Party	Seats
Liberal Democrats	33
Labour	23
Conservative	13
Green	1
Total	70

== Summary ==
=== Election result ===
2007 Bristol City Council election
Party	This election				Full council			This election		
Party	Candidates	Seats	Net	Seats %	Other	Total	Total %	Votes	Votes %	+/−
Liberal Democrats	25	12	▼2	48.0	19	31	44.3	18,705	26.6	▼7.5
Labour	25	10	▲2	40.0	15	25	35.7	21,059	30.1	▲1.8
Conservative	25	3	Steady	12.0	10	13	18.6	17,668	25.3	▲2.2
Green	23	0	Steady	0.0	1	1	4.3	9,816	14.0	▲7.1
BNP	2	0	Steady	0.0	0	0	0.0	1,416	2.0	▲0.3
Respect	1	0	Steady	0.0	0	0	0.0	621	0.9	N/a
UKIP	1	0	Steady	0.0	0	0	0.0	316	0.5	N/a
Independent	1	0	Steady	0.0	0	0	0.0	181	0.3	▼0.7
Socialist	1	0	Steady	0.0	0	0	0.0	129	0.2	▲0.1
Total	104	25	Steady		48	70		69,911		

Popular vote
Labour	30.12%
Liberal Democrats	26.76%
Conservative	25.27%
Green	14.04%
Other	3.81%

Council seats
Liberal Democrats	48.00%
Labour	40.00%
Conservative	12.00%

Bristol City Council composition following the 2006 election

=== Election of Group Leaders ===
Steve Comer (Eastville) was elected leader of the Liberal Democrats group with Jon Rogers (Ashley) as his deputy, Helen Holland (Whitchurch Park) was re-elected leader of the Labour Group and Richard Eddy (Bishopsworth) was re-elected leader of the Conservative group.

== Ward results ==
Swings are compared to the 2003 election when these seats were last contested.

=== Ashley ===
Ashley
Party	Candidate	Votes	%	±%
Liberal Democrats	Shirley Marshall	1,237	37.36	
Green	Daniella Elsa Radice	1,127	34.04	
Labour	Ricky Orlando Nelson	765	23.10	
Conservative	Nyla Jabeen Qureshi	182	5.50	
Majority				
Rejected ballots				
Turnout				
Registered electors		9,197		
Liberal Democrats hold		Swing		

=== Bedminster ===
Bedminster 2007
Party	Candidate	Votes	%
Labour	Colin John Smith	1,299	38.50
Conservative	Doug Newton	1,037	30.74
Green	Cath Slade	685	20.30
Liberal Democrats	Matthew John Greenwood	353	10.46
Majority			
Labour hold			

=== Bishopsworth ===
Bishopsworth 2007
Party	Candidate	Votes	%
Conservative	Richard Stephen Eddy	1,611	57.89
Labour	Munawar Ahmad Gondal	653	23.46
Green	Barrie Robert Lewis	347	12.47
Liberal Democrats	Lena Clare Wright	172	6.18
Majority			
Conservative hold			

=== Brislington East ===
Brislington East 2007
Party	Candidate	Votes	%
Labour	Simon Mark Geoffrey Crew	1,258	42.10
Conservative	James Stevenson	1,173	39.26
Liberal Democrats	Roger Graham Norman	286	9.57
Green	Ruth Cormack	271	9.07
Majority			
Labour hold			

=== Brislington West ===
Brislington West 2007
Party	Candidate	Votes	%
Liberal Democrats	Jackie Norman	1,150	41.52
Conservative	Colin Robert Bretherton	807	29.13
Green	David Kevin Naismith	451	16.28
Labour	Brian Peter Mead	362	13.07
Majority			
Liberal Democrats hold			

=== Cabot ===
Cabot 2007
Party	Candidate	Votes	%
Liberal Democrats	Alex Woodman	1,005	47.05
Green	Christopher John Gittins	430	20.13
Conservative	Iain Jenkins Dennis	374	17.51
Labour	Tom Fleuriot	327	15.31
Majority			
Liberal Democrats hold			

=== Clifton ===
Clifton 2007
Party	Candidate	Votes	%
Liberal Democrats	Barbara Janke	1,402	51.24
Conservative	Maurice David Cousins	640	23.39
Green	Alex Dunn	445	16.26
Labour	Anne-Marie Godfrey	249	9.10
Majority			
Liberal Democrats hold			

=== Clifton East ===
Clifton East 2007
Party	Candidate	Votes	%
Liberal Democrats	Michael Henry Popham	851	38.14
Conservative	Victor Roy Tallis	808	36.22
Green	John Mark Hills	344	15.42
Labour	David Andrew Jones	228	10.22
Majority			
Liberal Democrats hold			

=== Cotham ===
Cotham 2007
Party	Candidate	Votes	%
Liberal Democrats	Neil Robert Harrison	1,099	21.74
Liberal Democrats	Roger McDermott	942	18.64
Green	Geoff Collard	692	13.69
Conservative	James Michael Barlow	538	10.64
Conservative	Sue Fleming	526	10.41
Green	Alan Clarke	465	9.20
Labour	Karin Smyth	430	8.51
Labour	David Ian Jepson	363	7.18
Majority			
Liberal Democrats hold			
Liberal Democrats hold			

=== Easton ===
Easton 2007
Party	Candidate	Votes	%
Labour	Faruk Choudhury	969	29.85
Liberal Democrats	John Francis Kiely	889	27.39
Respect	Paulette North	621	19.13
Green	Christine Mary Prior	560	17.25
Conservative	Nick Jethwa	207	6.38
Majority			
Labour gain from Liberal Democrats			

=== Eastville ===
Eastville 2007
Party	Candidate	Votes	%
Liberal Democrats	Muriel Cole	1,410	49.75
Labour	Gerald Rosenberg	846	29.85
Conservative	Rowland Henry Webb	578	20.40
Majority			
Liberal Democrats hold			

=== Filwood ===
Filwood 2007
Party	Candidate	Votes	%
Labour	Jeff Lovell	1,311	67.23
Conservative	Antony James Morrison	284	14.56
Liberal Democrats	David Malcolm Rothwell	205	10.51
Green	Graham Hugh Davey	150	7.69
Majority			
Labour gain from Liberal Democrats			

=== Frome Vale ===
Frome Valley 2007
Party	Candidate	Votes	%
Conservative	Lesley Ann Alexander	1,441	43.03
Labour	Kuj Kujore	968	28.90
BNP	Colin Richard Chidsey	399	11.91
Liberal Democrats	Karen Dawn Comer	323	9.64
Green	Josephine McLellan	218	6.51
Majority			
Conservative hold			

=== Hartcliffe ===
Hartcliffe 2007
Party	Candidate	Votes	%
Labour	Mark Royston Brian	1,397	50.52
Conservative	Nicki Crandon	1,081	39.10
Liberal Democrats	Linda Kynoch Hopkins	160	5.79
Green	Diana Lewen Warner	127	4.59
Majority			
Labour hold			

=== Hengrove ===
Hengrove 2007
Party	Candidate	Votes	%
Liberal Democrats	Jos Clark	1,182	36.41
Conservative	Richard Jonathan Zaltzman	1,152	35.49
Labour	Barry David Clark	714	22.00
Green	Stephen Edward John Farthing	198	6.10
Majority			
Liberal Democrats hold			

=== Hillfields ===
Hillfields 2007
Party	Candidate	Votes	%
Labour	Martin John Golding	1,167	41.00
Conservative	Christopher Philip Smith	580	20.38
Liberal Democrats	Patrick Hassell	556	19.54
UKIP	David William Glazebrook	316	11.10
Green	Leon Roman Quinn	227	7.98
Majority			
Labour hold			

=== Knowle ===
Knowle 2007
Party	Candidate	Votes	%
Liberal Democrats	Chris Davies	1,352	45.41
Labour	Benjamin Mitchell	642	21.57
Conservative	Adam Beda Tayler	518	17.40
Green	Glenn Royston Vowles	465	15.62
Majority			
Liberal Democrats hold			

=== Lawrence Hill ===
Lawrence Hill 2007
Party	Candidate	Votes	%
Liberal Democrats	Susan Rosemary O’Donnell	1,162	43.01
Labour	Busharat Ali	1,081	40.01
Green	Michael Crawford	298	11.03
Conservative	Jai Teging Singh	161	5.96
Majority			
Liberal Democrats hold			

=== Southville ===
Southville 2007
Party	Candidate	Votes	%
Labour	Sean David Benyon	1,469	40.13
Green	Tess Green	1,463	40.13
Conservative	Simon Paul Anthony Scarpa	332	9.07
Liberal Democrats	Pauline Mary Allen	216	5.90
Independent	Jon Harris	181	4.94
Majority			
Labour hold			

=== St George East ===
St George East 2007
Party	Candidate	Votes	%
Labour	Fabian Breckels	1,081	35.28
Conservative	Christopher John Windows	1,018	33.22
BNP	John Hooper	590	19.26
Liberal Democrats	Paul Elvin	375	12.24
Majority			
Labour hold			

=== St George West ===
St George West 2007
Party	Candidate	Votes	%
Labour	John Edward Deasy	1,118	38.24
Conservative	Angelo Agathangelou	1,077	36.83
Liberal Democrats	Tony Potter	729	24.93
Majority			
Labour hold			

=== Stockwood ===
Stockwood 2007
Party	Candidate	Votes	%
Conservative	Jay Jethwa	1,476	50.48
Green	Peter Antony Goodwin	599	20.49
Labour	Robert David Knowles-Leak	568	19.43
Liberal Democrats	Joanna Lesley Prescott	281	9.61
Majority			
Conservative hold			

=== Whitchurch Park ===
Whitchurch Park 2007
Party	Candidate	Votes	%
Labour	Helen Holland	1,399	44.06
Liberal Democrats	Lorraine Horgan	905	28.50
BNP	Kerry Ellen Luckett	427	13.45
Conservative	Jenny Rogers	318	10.02
Green	Victor Clifford Bryant	126	3.97
Majority			
Labour hold			

=== Windmill Hill ===
Windmill Hill 2007
Party	Candidate	Votes	%
Liberal Democrats	Mark Bailey	1,405	44.46
Labour	Christopher Louis Orlik	758	23.99
Green	Stephen Petter	593	18.77
Conservative	Graham David Morris	275	8.70
Socialist	Thomas James Baldwin	129	4.08
Majority			
Liberal Democrats hold			
