= 2003 Bristol City Council election =

2003 UK local government election

- 1 May 2003

24 of 70 seats (one third) to Bristol City Council 36 seats needed for a majority
- Registered: 196,221
- Turnout: 34.19%

	Majority party	Minority party	Third party
Leader	Diane Bunyan	Barbara Janke	Peter Abraham
Party	Labour	Liberal Democrats	Conservative
Leader since	May 2002	15 May 1997	14 January 1999
Leader's seat	Windmill Hill (defeated)	Clifton	Stoke Bishop
Last election	36	24	10
Seats before	13	9	2
Seats won	8	13	3
Seats after	31	28	11
Seat change	▼5	▲4	▲1
Popular vote	18,942	22,901	15,414
Percentage	28.3%	34.2%	23.0%
Swing	▼11.6%	▲5.7%	▲0.9%
	Fourth party
Party	Green
Last election	0
Seats before	0
Seats won	0
Seats after	0
Seat change	Steady
Popular vote	4,631
Percentage	6.9%
Swing	▼0.0%
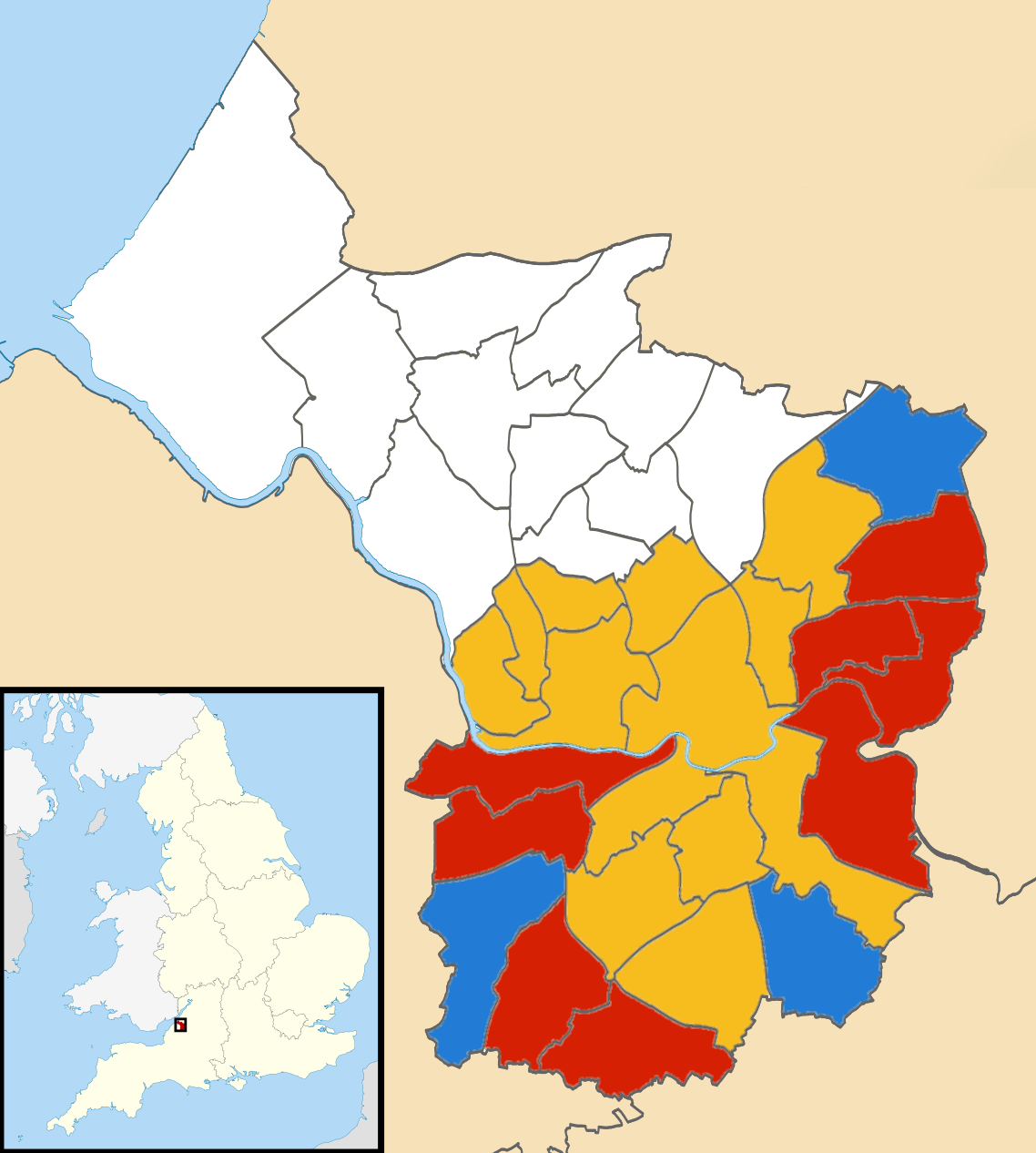
- 2003 local election results in Bristol
Council Leader before election before election
Diane Bunyan
Labour
Council Leader after election
Barbara Janke
Liberal Democrats

The 2003 Bristol City Council election took place on 1 May 2003, on the same day as other local elections in the UK. The Labour Party made a number of losses, mainly to the Liberal Democrats, and lost overall control of the council.

Loses included Council leader Diane Bunyan, who lost her Windmill Hill seat to the Liberal Democrats. This year also saw elections contested by the new Bristolian Party, founded by the local 'scandal sheet' The Bristolian, though they failed to win any seats.

== Previous composition ==
=== 2001 election ===
Party	Seats
Labour	36
Liberal Democrats	24
Conservative	10
Total	70

== Summary ==
=== Election result ===
2003 Bristol City Council election
Party	This election				Full council			This election		
Party	Candidates	Seats	Net	Seats %	Other	Total	Total %	Votes	Votes %	+/−
Liberal Democrats	24	13	▲4	54.2	15	28	40.0	22,901	34.2	▲5.7
Labour	24	8	▼5	33.3	16	31	44.3	18,942	28.3	▼11.6
Conservative	24	3	▲1	12.5	8	11	15.7	15,414	23.0	▲0.9
Green	23	0	Steady	0.0	0	0	0.0	4,631	6.9	▼0.0
Bristolian	11	0	Steady	0.0	0	0	0.0	2,560	3.8	N/a
BNP	4	0	Steady	0.0	0	0	0.0	1,128	1.7	N/a
Independent	2	0	Steady	0.0	0	0	0.0	623	0.9	N/a
Socialist Alliance	4	0	Steady	0.0	0	0	0.0	513	0.8	N/a
Socialist Labour	2	0	Steady	0.0	0	0	0.0	109	0.2	▼0.9
Socialist	1	0	Steady	0.0	0	0	0.0	60	0.1	▼1.2
Total	119	24	Steady		46	70	65.7	66,881		

Popular vote
Liberal Democrats	34.24%
Labour	28.32%
Conservative	23.05%
Green	6.92%
Bristolian	3.83%
Other	3.64%

Council seats
Liberal Democrats	54.17%
Labour	33.33%
Conservative	12.50%

Bristol City Council composition following the 2003 election

=== Election of Group Leaders ===
Peter Hammond (Southmead) was elected leader of the Labour Group, Barbara Janke (Clifton) was re-elected leader of the Liberal Democrats group and Peter Abraham (Stoke Bishop) was re-elected leader of the Conservative group.

== Government Formation ==
Following the loss of their majority, new labour leader Peter Hammond announced the party's intention to leave government, saying "Following a second year of failing to win the popular vote and finding ourselves without a majority on the council we feel the only principled and legitimate decision is to pass control to the other two parties. We feel this is a reflection of the desire of the voters of Bristol to have a change." However both opposition parties refused to take over unless Labour remained part of the government, with the Lib Dems proposing for an interim cabinet made up of representatives from all three parties and the Conservative suggesting a 5-member interim cabinet headed by their leader Peter Abraham. After failed meetings on 13 & 20 May and 5 June, on 9 June, following a fourth failed meeting the labour caretaker executive resigned.

However, by 17 June, Labour had backed down and agreed to the Lib Dem proposal of a cabinet of three Lib Dems, three Labour and two Conservative councillors, led by their leader Barbara Janke.

== Ward results ==
Swings are compared to the 1999 election when these seats were last contested.

=== Ashley ===
Ashley
Party	Candidate	Votes	%	±%
Liberal Democrats	Shirley Marshall	1,313	41.6	+10.6
Labour	Helga Benson *	746	23.6	–11.8
Bristolian	Darryl Wandless	343	10.9	N/a
Green	David Simpson	335	10.6	–10.1
Socialist Alliance	Anne Lemon	202	6.4	N/a
Conservative	Richard Manns	151	4.8	+0.9
Socialist Labour	Bernard Kennedy	65	2.1	–6.9
Majority		567	18.0	+13.5
Rejected ballots		9	0.3	+0.1
Turnout		3,164	38.5	–5.0
Registered electors		8,226		–3.5
Liberal Democrats gain from Labour		Swing	+11.2	

=== Bedminster ===
Bedminster
Party	Candidate	Votes	%	±%
Labour	Peter Crispin *	1,001	31.70	
Independent	Stewart Parkman	508	16.09	N/a
Conservative	Christian Simpson	436	13.81	
Liberal Democrats	Paul Elvin	386	12.22	
Bristolian	Julie Palmer	319	10.10	N/a
BNP	Clive Courtney	310	9.82	N/a
Green	Peter Andrews	198	6.27	
Majority		493	15.61	
Rejected ballots		6	0.2	
Turnout		3,164	36.8	
Registered electors		8,588		
Labour hold		Swing		

=== Bishopsworth ===
Bishopsworth
Party	Candidate	Votes	%	±%
Conservative	Richard Eddy *	2,119	63.63	
Labour	Julie Watts	735	22.07	
BNP	David Millard	195	5.86	N/a
Liberal Democrats	Jean Lemin	190	5.71	
Green	Barrie Lewis	91	2.73	
Majority		1,384	41.56	
Rejected ballots				
Turnout				
Registered electors		8,384		
Conservative hold		Swing		

=== Brislington East ===
Brislington East
Party	Candidate	Votes	%	±%
Labour	Peter Begley *	1,165	40.28	
Conservative	Vincent Mora	839	29.01	
Liberal Democrats	Jeffery Exon	448	15.49	
BNP	John Jarvis	293	10.13	N/a
Green	David Coombes	103	3.56	
Socialist Labour	Brian Corbett	44	1.52	
Majority		326	11.27	
Rejected ballots				
Turnout				
Registered electors		8,533		
Labour hold		Swing		

=== Brislington West ===
Brislington West
Party	Candidate	Votes	%	±%
Liberal Democrats	Jackie Norman *	1,573	56.16	
Labour	Terry Cook	611	21.81	
Conservative	Colin Bretherton	442	15.78	
Green	Mary Wood	175	6.25	
Majority		962	34.35	
Rejected ballots				
Turnout				
Registered electors		7,840		
Liberal Democrats hold		Swing		

=== Cabot ===
Cabot
Party	Candidate	Votes	%	±%
Liberal Democrats	Anne White *	981	52.83	
Labour	Brian Mead	290	15.62	
Conservative	Ian Dennis	233	12.55	
Bristolian	Richard Higgs	178	9.59	N/a
Green	Lela McTernan	175	9.42	
Majority		691	37.21	
Rejected ballots				
Turnout				
Registered electors		7,679		
Liberal Democrats hold		Swing		

=== Clifton ===
Clifton
Party	Candidate	Votes	%	±%
Liberal Democrats	Barbara Janke *	1,499	57.19	
Conservative	Ian Millard	538	20.53	
Labour	Andrew Butterly	304	11.60	
Green	Arjuna Krishna-Das	171	6.52	
Bristolian	Bear Hackenbush	109	4.16	N/a
Majority		961	36.66	
Rejected ballots				
Turnout				
Registered electors		7,762		
Liberal Democrats hold		Swing		

=== Clifton East ===
Clifton
Party	Candidate	Votes	%	±%
Liberal Democrats	Geoffrey Jones *	996	45.07	
Conservative	Stephen O'Keefe	714	32.31	
Labour	Dave Sutton	257	11.63	
Green	John Hills	152	6.88	
Bristolian	Kevin Bainbridge	91	4.12	N/a
Majority		282	12.76	
Rejected ballots				
Turnout				
Registered electors		7,329		
Liberal Democrats hold		Swing		

=== Cotham ===
Cotham
Party	Candidate	Votes	%	±%
Liberal Democrats	Evelyn Elworthy *	1,257	52.35	
Conservative	Alistair Watson	395	16.45	
Labour	Judith Sluglett	386	16.08	
Green	Geoff Collard	363	15.12	
Majority		862	35.90	
Rejected ballots				
Turnout				
Registered electors		8,119		
Liberal Democrats hold		Swing		

=== Easton ===
Easton
Party	Candidate	Votes	%	±%
Liberal Democrats	John Kiely *	1,298	46.21	
Labour	Raja Khalid	603	21.47	
Bristolian	Jane Nicholl	427	15.20	N/a
Green	Samantha Pullinger	264	9.40	
Conservative	Seva Singh	118	4.20	
Socialist Alliance	Houri Ghamian	99	3.52	
Majority		695	24.74	
Rejected ballots				
Turnout				
Registered electors		8,022		
Liberal Democrats hold		Swing		

=== Eastville ===
Eastville
Party	Candidate	Votes	%	±%
Liberal Democrats	Muriel Cole	1,145	40.35	
Labour	Malcolm Patterson	781	27.52	
Conservative	Jonathan Thorne	498	17.55	
Green	Martin Cottingham	299	10.54	
Independent	Robert Paterson	155	4.05	N/a
Majority		364	12.83	
Rejected ballots				
Turnout				
Registered electors		8,125		
Liberal Democrats hold		Swing		

=== Filwood ===
Filwood
Party	Candidate	Votes	%	±%
Liberal Democrats	Ian Cooper	1,293	57.16	
Labour	Mary Smith	614	27.14	
Bristolian	Andrew Cocks	167	7.38	N/a
Conservative	Jonathan Hucker	127	5.61	
Green	Mary Thompson	61	2.70	
Majority		679	30.02	
Rejected ballots				
Turnout				
Registered electors		7,687		
Liberal Democrats gain from Labour		Swing		

=== Frome Vale ===
Frome Vale
Party	Candidate	Votes	%	±%
Conservative	Lesley Alexander	1,602	47.03	
Labour	Edmund Bramall	1,175	34.50	
Liberal Democrats	Roland Potts	481	14.12	
Green	Tony Gosling	148	4.35	
Majority		427	12.53	
Rejected ballots				
Turnout				
Registered electors		8,321		
Conservative gain from Labour		Swing		

=== Hartcliffe ===
Hartcliffe
Party	Candidate	Votes	%	±%
Labour	Mark Brain	996	42.49	
Conservative	Shirley Hodges	894	38.14	
Liberal Democrats	Joyce Cooper	366	15.61	
Green	Stephen Petter	88	3.75	
Majority		102	4.35	
Rejected ballots				
Turnout				
Registered electors		8,040		
Labour hold		Swing		

=== Hengrove ===
Hengrove
Party	Candidate	Votes	%	±%
Liberal Democrats	Jos Clark	1,600	51.83	
Conservative	Roy Pepworth	696	22.55	
Labour	Richard Hughes	695	22.51	
Green	Nicholas Thomas	96	3.11	
Majority		904	29.28	
Rejected ballots				
Turnout				
Registered electors		8,778		
Liberal Democrats hold		Swing		

=== Hillfields ===
Hillfields
Party	Candidate	Votes	%	±%
Labour	Graham Robertson *	1,057	43.36	
Liberal Democrats	John Hassell	726	29.78	
Conservative	Lindsay Elliott	655	26.87	
Majority		331	13.58	
Rejected ballots				
Turnout				
Registered electors		8,818		
Labour hold		Swing		

=== Knowle ===
Knowle
Party	Candidate	Votes	%	±%
Liberal Democrats	Christopher Davies	1,952	59.58	
Labour	Philip Gibby	717	21.89	
Conservative	Jennifer Rogers	315	9.62	
Green	Graham Davey	179	5.46	
Socialist Alliance	Clare Hall	113	3.45	
Majority		1,235	37.69	
Rejected ballots				
Turnout				
Registered electors		8,251		
Liberal Democrats gain from Labour		Swing		

=== Lawrence Hill ===
Lawrence Hill
Party	Candidate	Votes	%	±%
Liberal Democrats	John Astley *	1,150	46.30	
Labour	Carrie Martin	873	35.14	
Bristolian	Julien Weston	215	8.66	N/a
Conservative	Guy Dawe	149	6.00	
Green	Michael Crawford	97	3.90	
Majority		277	11.16	
Rejected ballots				
Turnout				
Registered electors		8,347		
Liberal Democrats hold		Swing		

=== Southville ===
Southville
Party	Candidate	Votes	%	±%
Labour	Linda Slater	1,294	40.94	
Green	Charles Bolton	923	29.20	
Conservative	Anthony Smith	419	13.26	
Liberal Democrats	Andrew Kybert	306	9.68	
Bristolian	Merv Woolford	159	5.03	N/a
Socialist	Mark Baker	60	1.90	
Majority		371	11.74	
Rejected ballots				
Turnout				
Registered electors		8,010		
Labour hold		Swing		

=== St George East ===
St George East
Party	Candidate	Votes	%	±%
Labour	Margaret Shovelton *	1,030	38.66	
Conservative	Matthew Denyer	914	34.31	
Liberal Democrats	Gordon Draper	469	17.61	
Bristolian	Andrew Way	144	5.41	N/a
Green	Donald Brown	107	4.02	
Majority		116	4.35	
Rejected ballots				
Turnout				
Registered electors		8,701		
Labour hold		Swing		

=== St George West ===
St George West
Party	Candidate	Votes	%	±%
Labour	John Deasy *	1,044	44.92	
Liberal Democrats	Gordon Williams	525	22.59	
Conservative	Charles Alexander	438	18.85	
Bristolian	John Francom	182	7.83	N/a
Green	David Mowat	135	5.81	
Majority		519	22.33	
Rejected ballots				
Turnout				
Registered electors		7,818		
Labour hold		Swing		

=== Stockwood ===
Stockwood
Party	Candidate	Votes	%	±%
Conservative	Jack Lopresti *	1,753	51.30	
Labour	Susan Milestone	741	21.69	
Liberal Democrats	Robert Johnston	511	14.95	
BNP	Dianne Carr	330	9.66	N/a
Green	Royston Gallop	82	2.40	
Majority		1,012	29.61	
Rejected ballots				
Turnout				
Registered electors		8,324		
Conservative hold		Swing		

=== Whitchurch Park ===
Whitchurch Park
Party	Candidate	Votes	%	±%
Labour	Helen Holland *	910	35.15	
Liberal Democrats	Nicholas Doddrell	878	33.90	
Conservative	Kathryn Morris	740	28.57	
Green	Daniella Radice	62	2.39	
Majority		32	1.24	
Rejected ballots				
Turnout				
Registered electors		7,793		
Labour hold		Swing		

=== Windmill Hill ===
Windmill Hill
Party	Candidate	Votes	%	±%
Liberal Democrats	Mark Bailey	1,558	46.42	
Labour	Diane Bunyan *	917	27.32	
Green	Patrick Hulme	327	9.74	
Conservative	Graham Morris	229	6.82	
Bristolian	Roy Norris	226	6.73	N/a
Socialist Alliance	Sharon Foley	99	2.95	
Majority		641	19.10	
Rejected ballots				
Turnout				
Registered electors		8,726		
Liberal Democrats gain from Labour		Swing		
