= 2002 Bristol City Council election =

2002 UK local government election

- 2 May 2002

24 of 70 seats (One third) to Bristol City Council 36 seats needed for a majority
- Registered: 200,683
- Turnout: 35.1%

	Majority party	Minority party	Third party
Leader	George Micklewright	Barbara Janke	Peter Abraham
Party	Labour	Liberal Democrats	Conservative
Leader since	2 May 1997	15 May 1997	14 January 1999
Leader's seat	Filwood (defeated)	Clifton	Stoke Bishop
Last election	40	21	9
Seats before	13	6	5
Seats won	9	9	6
Seats after	36	24	10
Seat change	▼4	▲3	▲1
Popular vote	21,358	22,806	20,807
Percentage	30.4%	32.4%	29.6%
Swing	▼8.0%	▲7.6%	▲0.1%
	Fourth party
Party	Green
Last election	0
Seats before	0
Seats won	0
Seats after	0
Seat change	Steady
Popular vote	3,620
Percentage	5.1%
Swing	▼1.0%
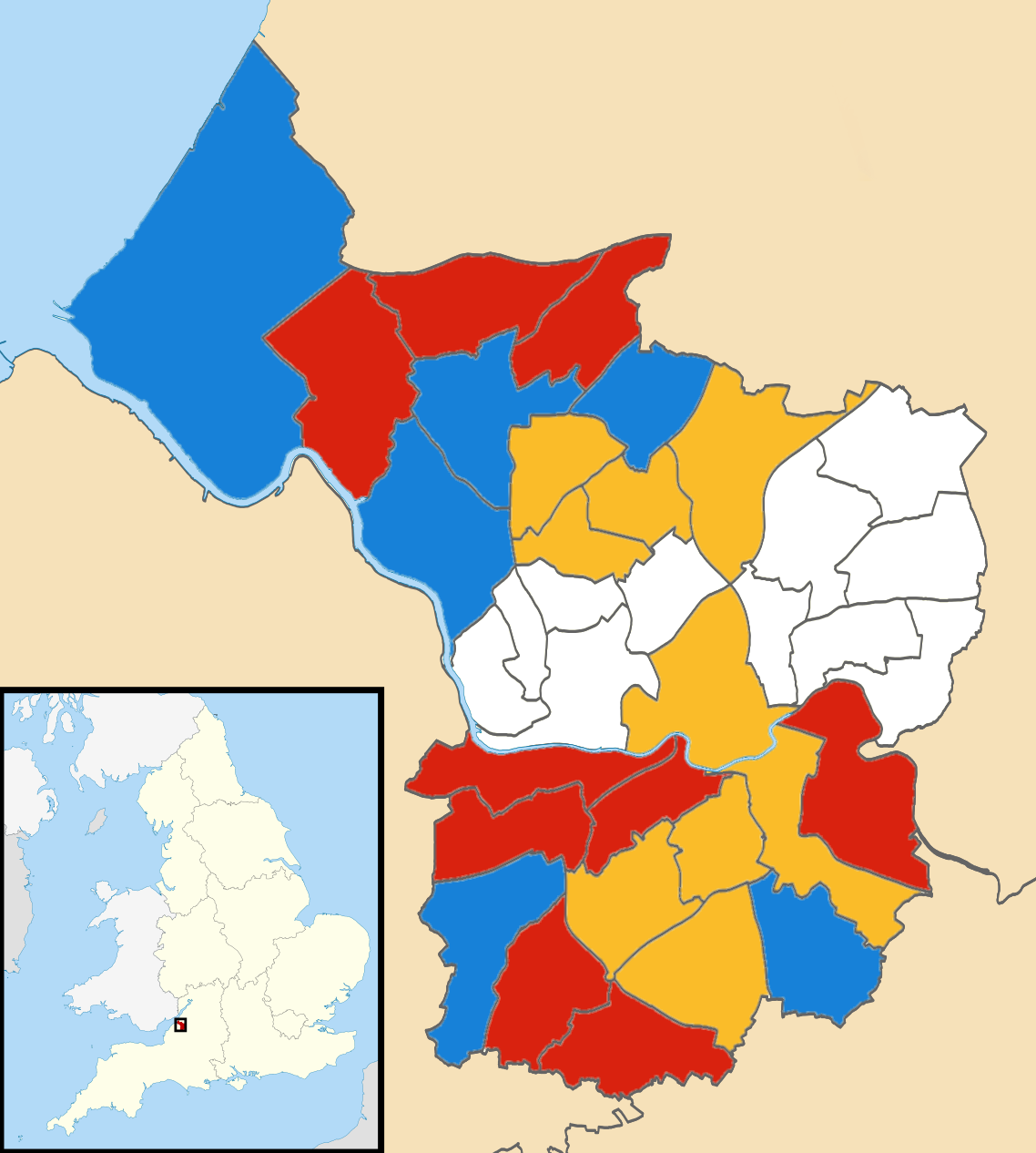
- 2002 local election results in Bristol
Council Leader before election before election
George Micklewright
Labour
Council Leader after election
Diane Bunyan
Labour

The 2002 Bristol City Council election took place on 2 May 2002, on the same day as other local elections. Despite suffering some losses, the Labour Party managed to retain a slim majority.

== Previous composition ==
=== 2001 election ===
Party	Seats
Labour	40
Liberal Democrats	21
Conservative	9
Total	70

=== Composition of council seats before election ===
Party	Seats
Labour	39
Liberal Democrats	21
Conservative	9
Vacant	1
Total	70

== Summary ==
=== Election result ===
2002 Bristol City Council election
Party	This election				Full council			This election		
Party	Candidates	Seats	Net	Seats %	Other	Total	Total %	Votes	Votes %	+/−
Labour	24	9	▼4	37.5	27	36	51.4	21,358	30.4	▼8.0
Liberal Democrats	24	9	▲3	37.5	15	24	34.3	22,806	32.4	▲7.6
Conservative	24	6	▲1	25.0	4	10	14.3	20,807	29.6	▲0.1
Green	24	0	Steady	0.0	0	0	0.0	3,620	5.1	▼1.0
Socialist Alliance	7	0	Steady	0.0	0	0	0.0	687	1.0	N/a
Independent	1	0	Steady	0.0	0	0	0.0	684	1.0	N/a
Socialist Labour	3	0	Steady	0.0	0	0	0.0	176	0.3	▼0.6
Socialist	2	0	Steady	0.0	0	0	0.0	158	0.2	▼0.1
Total	109	24	Steady		46	70		70,296		

Popular vote
Liberal Democrats	32.44%
Labour	30.38%
Conservative	29.60%
Green	5.15%
Other	2.43%

Council seats
Labour	37.50%
Liberal Democrats	37.50%
Conservative	25.00%

Bristol City Council composition following the 2002 election

=== Election of Group Leaders ===
Diane Bunyan (Windmill Hill) was elected leader of the Labour Group with Peter Hammond (Southmead) as her deputy, Barbara Janke (Clifton) was re-elected leader of the Liberal Democrats group and Peter Abraham (Stoke Bishop) was re-elected leader of the Conservative group.

== Government Formation ==
Diane Bunyan the leader of the Labour group was duly elected leader of the council and formed a labour administration.

== Ward results ==
Swings are compared to the 1999 election when these seats were last contested

=== Avonmouth ===
Avonmouth
Party	Candidate	Votes	%	±%
Conservative	Spud Murphy	1,428	44.0	+11.2
Labour	Celia Lukins *	1,339	41.3	–5.7
Liberal Democrats	Martyn Dunn	365	11.3	–3.1
Green	Luke Burns	112	3.5	–2.4
Majority		89	2.7	N/a
Rejected ballots		9	0.3	+0.2
Turnout		3,253	35.7	–0.8
Registered electors		9,116		+1.3
Conservative gain from Labour		Swing	+8.5	

=== Bedminster ===
Bedminster
Party	Candidate	Votes	%	±%
Labour	Claire Warren *	981	33.6	–14.3
Independent	Stewart Parkman	684	23.5	N/a
Liberal Democrats	Julie Palmer	485	16.6	–2.3
Conservative	Christian Simpson	474	16.3	–3.2
Green	Peter Andrews	185	6.3	–3.9
Socialist	Robin Clapp	107	3.7	+0.2
Majority		297	10.2	–18.3
Rejected ballots		3	0.1	–0.1
Turnout		2,919	33.5	+5.9
Registered electors		8,705		+1.0
Labour hold		Swing	–18.9	

=== Bishopston ===
Bishopston
Party	Candidate	Votes	%	±%
Liberal Democrats	David Kitson *	1,717	52.3	+6.7
Labour	Gerald Rosenberg	731	22.3	–14.3
Conservative	Jonathan Thorne	365	11.1	+2.2
Green	Martin Harvey	272	8.3	–0.5
Socialist Alliance	Elisabeth Winkler	195	5.9	N/a
Majority		986	30.1	+21.1
Rejected ballots		4	0.1	–0.1
Turnout		3,284	36.6	–4.7
Registered electors		8,984		+1.4
Liberal Democrats hold		Swing	+10.5	

=== Bishopsworth ===
Bishopsworth
Party	Candidate	Votes	%	±%
Conservative	Ronald Hodges *	1,756	58.3	–1.2
Labour	Keith Yarwood	893	29.7	+0.8
Liberal Democrats	Jo Carpenter	226	7.5	+2.1
Green	Barrie Lewis	135	4.5	–1.7
Majority		863	28.7	–2.0
Rejected ballots		3	0.1	+0.0
Turnout		3,013	35.5	–6.2
Registered electors		8,483		–0.3
Conservative hold		Swing	–1.0	

=== Brislington East ===
Brislington East
Party	Candidate	Votes	%	±%
Labour	William Martin *	1,149	44.6	–9.4
Conservative	Vincent Mora	781	30.3	+5.3
Liberal Democrats	Jeffery Exon	473	18.3	+7.5
Green	David Coombes	100	3.9	–0.8
Socialist Labour	Brian Corbett	75	2.9	–2.6
Majority		368	14.3	–14.7
Rejected ballots		4	0.2	–0.1
Turnout		2,582	29.3	–0.8
Registered electors		8,810		+1.0
Labour hold		Swing	–7.4	

=== Brislington West ===
Brislington West
Party	Candidate	Votes	%	±%
Liberal Democrats	Peter Main *	1,492	54.7	+2.5
Labour	Tony Poole	678	24.9	–3.4
Conservative	Colin Bretherton	440	16.1	+0.3
Green	Mary Wood	118	4.3	+0.6
Majority		814	29.8	+5.9
Rejected ballots		3	0.1	+0.1
Turnout		2,731	33.9	–2.7
Registered electors		8,046		+1.2
Liberal Democrats hold		Swing	+3.0	

=== Filwood ===
Filwood
Party	Candidate	Votes	%	±%
Liberal Democrats	Ann Cooper	1,385	55.3	+16.3
Labour	George Micklewright *	954	38.1	–12.3
Conservative	Lesley Alexander	113	4.5	–2.0
Green	Eamonn Murphy	33	1.3	N/a
Socialist Alliance	Philip Jones	21	0.8	N/a
Majority		431	17.2	N/a
Rejected ballots		5	0.2	+0.0
Turnout		2,511	31.8	+4.1
Registered electors		7,906		–0.3
Liberal Democrats gain from Labour		Swing	+14.3	

=== Hartcliffe ===
Hartcliffe
Party	Candidate	Votes	%	±%
Labour	Royston Griffey	981	48.3	–9.7
Conservative	Shirley Hodges	612	30.1	+7.1
Liberal Democrats	Ian Cooper	370	18.2	+4.6
Green	Maxine Gilman	67	3.3	–2.0
Majority		369	18.2	–16.8
Rejected ballots		4	0.2	+0.1
Turnout		2,034	24.7	–1.4
Registered electors		8,230		+1.4
Labour hold		Swing	–8.4	

=== Henbury ===
Henbury
Party	Candidate	Votes	%	±%
Labour	Claire Cook *	1,193	48.3	–9.0
Conservative	Roy Pepworth	817	33.1	+2.3
Liberal Democrats	Carol Knight	393	15.9	+4.0
Green	Donald Brown	68	2.8	N/a
Majority		376	15.2	–11.3
Rejected ballots		5	0.2	+0.0
Turnout		2,476	33.6	–1.9
Registered electors		7,367		–0.2
Labour hold		Swing	–5.7	

=== Hengrove ===
Hengrove
Party	Candidate	Votes	%	±%
Liberal Democrats	Mary Sykes *	1,481	44.4	+6.7
Conservative	Adam Tayler	977	29.3	–1.0
Labour	John Winterson	819	24.6	–5.3
Green	Michael Crawford	56	1.7	–0.5
Majority		504	15.1	+7.7
Rejected ballots		3	0.1	–0.0
Turnout		3,336	37.8	+1.4
Registered electors		8,835		+0.7
Liberal Democrats hold		Swing	+3.8	

=== Henleaze ===
Henleaze
Party	Candidate	Votes	%	±%
Liberal Democrats	Rosalie Brown *	2,400	59.9	+7.6
Conservative	Christopher Windows	1,176	29.3	–4.1
Labour	Keith Evans	284	7.1	–3.1
Green	William McCaskie	147	3.7	–0.4
Majority		1,224	30.5	+11.8
Rejected ballots		5	0.1	+0.0
Turnout		4,012	49.5	–1.9
Registered electors		8,105		–0.5
Liberal Democrats hold		Swing	+5.9	

=== Horfield ===
Horfield
Party	Candidate	Votes	%	±%
Conservative	Martin Kerry *	1,513	49.2	+5.1
Labour	David Rees	931	30.2	–7.9
Liberal Democrats	Andrew Ludlow	445	14.5	+0.8
Green	Simon Glover	102	3.3	–0.9
Socialist Alliance	Jonathan Kennedy	87	2.8	N/a
Majority		582	18.9	+13.0
Rejected ballots		7	0.2	+0.2
Turnout		3,085	35.8	–0.9
Registered electors		8,626		–0.8
Conservative hold		Swing	+6.5	

=== Kingsweston ===
Kingsweston
Party	Candidate	Votes	%	±%
Labour	John Bees *	1,049	38.6	–1.6
Liberal Democrats	Terence Thomas	827	30.4	+0.6
Conservative	Michael Cobb	702	25.8	–0.3
Green	John Hills	95	3.5	–0.4
Socialist Alliance	Brian Drummond	48	1.8	N/a
Majority		222	8.2	–2.2
Rejected ballots		8	0.3	+0.3
Turnout		2,729	35.7	+0.5
Registered electors		7,636		+2.0
Labour hold		Swing	–1.1	

=== Knowle ===
Knowle
Party	Candidate	Votes	%	±%
Liberal Democrats	Gary Hopkins	1,795	51.5	+25.7
Labour	David Johnson	1,059	30.4	–7.9
Conservative	Stuart Quayle	359	10.3	–11.5
Green	Graham Davey	169	4.8	–6.4
Socialist Alliance	Peter Wearden	105	3.0	N/a
Majority		736	21.1	N/a
Rejected ballots		10	0.3	+0.1
Turnout		3,497	42.1	+10.3
Registered electors		8,297		+0.7
Liberal Democrats gain from Labour		Swing	+16.8	

=== Lawrence Hill ===
This was a by election triggered by the resignation of sitting councilor John Channon and was for the remaining year of his term.

Lawrence Hill by election
Party	Candidate	Votes	%	±%
Liberal Democrats	John Astley	1,204	48.4	+11.3
Labour	Edmund Bramall	1,025	41.2	–2.7
Conservative	Guy Dawe	115	4.6	–2.9
Green	Jane Lewis	111	4.5	–1.4
Socialist Labour	Giles Shorter	34	1.4	–4.2
Majority		179	7.2	N/a
Rejected ballots		14	0.6	+0.4
Turnout		2,503	27.6	+0.1
Registered electors		9,064		+4.8
Liberal Democrats gain from Labour		Swing	+7.0	

=== Lockleaze ===
This seat had been gained by the Liberal Democrats in a February 2000 by election, but is shown as a gain as compared to the 1999 election.

Lockleaze
Party	Candidate	Votes	%	±%
Liberal Democrats	Sean Emmett *	1,492	56.8	+33.1
Labour	Nichola Barton	797	30.3	–18.5
Conservative	Matthew Stallabrass	236	9.0	–12.3
Green	Vince Jones	51	1.9	–4.3
Socialist	Roger Thomas	51	1.9	N/a
Majority		695	26.5	N/a
Rejected ballots		3	0.1	–0.0
Turnout		2,630	33.4	+5.0
Registered electors		7,871		–0.1
Liberal Democrats gain from Labour		Swing	+25.8	

=== Redland ===
Redland
Party	Candidate	Votes	%	±%
Liberal Democrats	Sylvia Townsend *	1,486	46.4	+14.4
Conservative	Alastair Watson	812	25.4	–1.9
Labour	Kerry Barker	576	18.0	–10.5
Green	Justin Quinnell	328	10.2	–2.1
Majority		674	21.0	+17.5
Rejected ballots		7	0.2	+0.2
Turnout		3,209	38.0	–3.2
Registered electors		8,444		–0.1
Liberal Democrats hold		Swing	+8.1	

=== Southmead ===
Southmead
Party	Candidate	Votes	%	±%
Labour	Jenny Smith *	940	48.8	–7.3
Liberal Democrats	Shaun Jones	486	25.2	+5.7
Conservative	Anthony Smith	434	22.5	+2.0
Green	Geoff Collard	65	3.4	N/a
Majority		454	23.6	–14.6
Rejected ballots		10	0.5	+0.4
Turnout		1,935	25.0	+1.9
Registered electors		7,737		+1.2
Labour hold		Swing	–6.5	

=== Southville ===
Southville
Party	Candidate	Votes	%	±%
Labour	Matthew Symonds	1,285	44.9	–7.4
Green	Charles Bolton	534	18.7	+6.7
Conservative	Philip Cobbold	494	17.3	+0.2
Liberal Democrats	Paul Elvin	442	15.5	–0.8
Socialist Alliance	Jonathan Harris	105	3.7	N/a
Majority		751	26.3	–9.0
Rejected ballots		11	0.4	+0.2
Turnout		2,871	34.7	+2.9
Registered electors		8,270		+0.3
Labour hold		Swing	–7.0	

=== Stockwood ===
Stockwood
Party	Candidate	Votes	%	±%
Conservative	David Morris *	1,864	55.0	+8.9
Labour	Lesley Mansell	920	27.2	–10.0
Liberal Democrats	Jane Collins	505	14.9	+1.1
Green	Samantha Thompson	98	2.9	–0.1
Majority		944	27.9	+18.9
Rejected ballots		53	1.5	+1.5
Turnout		3,440	40.4	–0.3
Registered electors		8,505		–0.6
Conservative hold		Swing	+9.5	

=== Stoke Bishop ===
Stoke Bishop
Party	Candidate	Votes	%	±%
Conservative	John Goulandris	2,118	66.5	+6.5
Liberal Democrats	Gillian Donald	539	16.9	–4.6
Labour	Dianne Manning	373	11.7	–1.2
Green	Keith Wiltshire	153	4.8	–0.8
Majority		1,579	49.6	+11.1
Rejected ballots		5	0.2	+0.1
Turnout		3,188	39.1	+0.3
Registered electors		8,158		+0.5
Conservative hold		Swing	+5.5	

=== Westbury-on-Trym ===
Westbury-on-Trym
Party	Candidate	Votes	%	±%
Conservative	Ashley Fox	2,240	49.1	–9.5
Liberal Democrats	Nicholas Doddrell	1,847	40.5	+22.2
Labour	Judith Sluglett	338	7.4	–10.4
Green	John Devaney	133	2.9	–2.3
Majority		393	8.6	–31.7
Rejected ballots		3	0.1	–0.0
Turnout		4,561	55.1	+9.6
Registered electors		8,275		–1.5
Conservative hold		Swing	–15.9	

=== Whitchurch Park ===
Whitchurch Park
Party	Candidate	Votes	%	±%
Labour	Colin Smith	1,058	47.6	–10.6
Conservative	Jonathan Hucker	620	27.9	+12.7
Liberal Democrats	James Carpenter	464	20.9	+0.3
Green	Mary Thomson	83	3.7	–2.5
Majority		438	19.7	–21.1
Rejected ballots		2	0.1	+0.1
Turnout		2,227	27.5	+1.3
Registered electors		8,099		–0.4
Labour hold		Swing	–11.7	

=== Windmill Hill ===
Windmill Hill
Party	Candidate	Votes	%	±%
Labour	Christopher Orlik *	1,005	41.0	–11.8
Liberal Democrats	Joyce Cooper	487	19.9	+7.5
Green	Patrick Hulme	405	16.5	+0.6
Conservative	Graham Morris	361	14.7	+1.0
Socialist Alliance	Arnie Nevin	126	5.1	N/a
Socialist Labour	Katherine Cremer	67	2.7	N/a
Majority		518	21.1	–22.0
Rejected ballots		7	0.3	+0.1
Turnout		2,458	27.0	–1.0
Registered electors		9,114		+3.1
Labour hold		Swing	–9.6	
