= Cal (2013 film) =

2013 British-released drama film

- DVD cover
- Directed by: Christian Martin
- Written by: Christian Martin
- Produced by: Christian Martin; Bernie Hodges
- Starring: Wayne Virgo; Tom Payne; Emily Corcoran; Lucy Russell; Simon Cook
- Cinematography: Jack O'Dowd
- Edited by: Jack O'Dowd
- Music by: Cliff Airey; Rob Dunstone
- Production company: Bonne idée Productions
- Distributed by: TLA Releasing (U.S.)
- Release date: 21 February 2013
- Running time: 89 minutes
- Country: United Kingdom
- Language: English

Cal is a 2013 British-released drama film starring Wayne Virgo, Tom Payne, Emily Corcoran, Lucy Russell, and Simon Cook. The film was written and produced by Christian Martin and Bernie Hodges, and directed by Christian Martin.

== Plot ==
This film is a sequel to the 2009 film Shank. Troubled teen Cal, who was once involved in gang life, has now left and fled his home town Bristol to start living a new life. After Cal's mother falls ill in the hospital he returns to Britain. Cal finds, that, like many other places he has visited on mainland Europe, his hometown has suffered from an economic collapse as well.

== Cast ==
- Wayne Virgo as Cal
- Tom Payne as Jason
- Emily Corcoran as Aunty Jane
- Lucy Russell as Cath Miller
- Daniel Brocklebank as Ivan
- Bernie Hodges as Journalist – Phil Trope
- Simon Cook as Oncologist (rumored)
- Richard Cambridge as Jim
- Garry Summers as Radio Announcer
- Tony Banham as Policeman
- Deborah Fleming as Nurse
- Anna Gallagher as Ivan's Girlfriend
- Tim J. Henley as Chef

== DVD release ==
The Cal DVD came out on 9 September 2013 in the UK.

== Soundtrack ==
On 15 April 2015, Bristol musician Cliff Airey released three tracks from the Cal soundtrack on Bandcamp.

== Filming locations ==
- An industrial Estate near Pennywell Road, Easton, Bristol
- A now-demolished housing estate, Southmead, Bristol
- Trenchard Street Car Park, Trenchard Street, Bristol
- Skull graffiti building – Ninetree Hill, Cotham, Briston
- Laundrette – Cotham Road South, Cotham, Bristol
- Blackberry Hill Hospital, Fishponds, Bristol
- Montpelier Park, Montpelier, Bristol
- Brandon Hill, The Centre, Bristol
- St Paul's area, Bristol
