= Shank (2009 film) =

2009 film by Simon Pearce

- DVD cover
- Directed by: Simon Pearce; Christian Martin (uncredited)
- Written by: Darren Flaxstone Christian Martin
- Produced by: Christian Martin; Robert Shulevitz
- Starring: Wayne Virgo; Marc Laurent; Alice Payne; Tom Bott; Louise Fearnside
- Cinematography: Simon Pearce
- Edited by: Darren Flaxstone
- Music by: Barnaby Taylor
- Production company: FAQs www.bonne-idee-productions.com
- Distributed by: TLA Releasing
- Release date: 14 April 2009
- Running time: 94 minutes
- Country: United Kingdom
- Languages: English; French
- Budget: £20,000

Shank is a 2009 British drama film starring Wayne Virgo, Marc Laurent, Alice Payne, Tom Bott and Garry Summers. The film was written by Darren Flaxstone and Christian Martin, directed by Simon Pearce & Christian Martin (uncredited), and produced by independent filmmaker Robert Shulevitz and Christian Martin.

The film won an Audience award in the 2009 Barcelona International Gay and Lesbian Film Festival as well as the Emerging Talent in Queer Cinema in 2009 at the Miami Gay and Lesbian Film Festival.

== Plot ==
In Bristol, Cal (Wayne Virgo) is a 19-year-old closeted homosexual gang member who has nothing in his life except drugs, intercourse, random acts of violence and a secret that he keeps hidden from his friends. An online hookup for intercourse with a stranger named Scott (Garry Summers), ends up in him assaulting and abandoning Scott out in the countryside. This temporarily satisfies, but fails to dampen his unspoken love desires for his best friend, Jonno (Tom Bott). Nessa (Alice Payne), their twisted, foul-mouthed and controlling gang leader who has much hatred towards everyone due to losing a child at the age of 14, suspects that there is something going on between them. Jonno cannot express his own deep rooted and unrequited attachment to Cal due to Nessa's manipulation. Manipulating situations bring Nessa closer to having her suspicions confirmed, so Nessa sets on dividing loyalties and encouraging conflict.

An innocent student, Olivier (Marc Laurent), falls victim to one of Nessa's plans and is robed on her orders by the gang. Cal steps in to restrain them and creates a distraction allowing Olivier to run free. Ignoring Nessa's screams of contempt, he chases after Oliver and offers him a ride by way of an apology. Fearing that the fall-out from Nessa for his actions will be harsh, Cal persuades Olivier to help him out. Seizing the moral high ground and sensing that there was something more to Cal's Good Samaritan act, Olivier allows Cal to stay with him for a few days. Acting on his own attraction to Cal, Olivier seduces him and in doing so, exposes Cal to new emotions and a tenderness that he has never experienced before.

Soon, the boys are overtaken by the embrace of the first flush of love. Cal and Olivier's relationship progresses, but Olivier is warned by Scott, who happens to be one of his professors, to be wary of Cal. Scott gives Olivier his phone number and tells Olivier to contact him if he is ever in need of help. Nessa cannot contain her rage for Cal's disloyalty to the gang and sets about hunting him down with intent on destroying him once and for all. With her gang, she kidnaps Olivier, taunting Cal with video messages via her mobile phone, to come and save his boyfriend. Arriving at the abandoned factory where they are all waiting for him, he reveals that he is equally hurt by the child she lost, as he was the father. Meanwhile, Jonno and the other gang members begin to destroy Cal's car before they turn toward him. As the showdown unfolds, Nessa loses all control of events and Jonno explodes in act of sexual aggression by raping Cal and leaving everyone traumatized. Shocked by what she has witnessed, Nessa realizes she will now never be able to break the bond between Cal and Olivier while she and the other gang members flee. Olivier then contacts Scott for help and he rescues them and tends to Cal's wounds.

As the film ends Cal sends Scott a video of the man being beat up in the opening scenes of the movie, with the message "Sorry". That man turns out to be Scott's husband (they both wore wedding rings) who is still in a coma at the hospital. Cal throws away his phone, before joining hands and boarding a train with Olivier, severing his last remaining link to the gang and his old life.

== Cast ==
- Wayne Virgo as Cal
- Marc Laurent as Olivier
- Alice Payne as Nessa
- Tom Bott as Jonno
- Garry Summers as Scott
- Bernie Hodges as Will
- Christian Martin as David
- Louise Fearnside as Dayna
- Lewis Alexander as Souljah
- Oliver Park as Gang Member 1

== Release ==
Shank was released on 14 April 2009 in the United Kingdom. It was released in the United States in May 2009 at the Miami Gay and Lesbian Film Festival. The DVD release was on 8 December 2009.

=== Critical reception ===
As of June 2020, the film holds a 60% approval rating on review aggregator website Rotten Tomatoes, based on five reviews with an average rating of 5.9 out of 10.

== Sequel ==
The film was followed by a sequel, Cal, in 2013.

== Awards ==
- Barcelona International Gay & Lesbian Film Festival -Won, Audience Awards 2009
- Miami Gay and Lesbian Film Festival- Won, Emerging Talent in Queer Cinema (Simon Pearce) 2009

== See also ==
- List of lesbian, gay, bisexual, or transgender-related films by storyline
