= Windmill Hill, Bristol =

Area of Bristol, England

Coordinates: 51.44°N 2.59°W

Windmill Hill
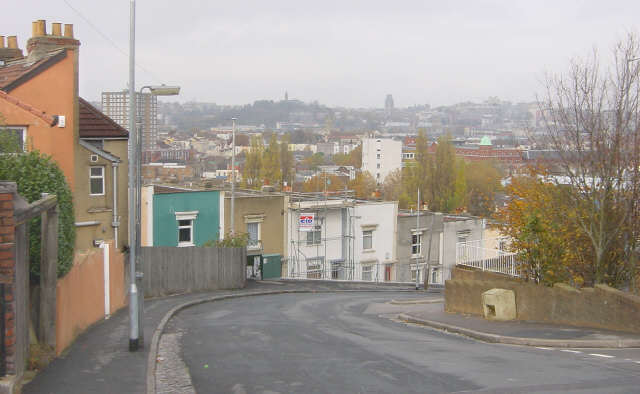
- The view looking north from Alfred Road, Windmill Hill, Bedminster in Bristol. Prominent on the horizon are Cabot Tower and the Wills Tower of Bristol University.

- Location within Bristol
- OS grid reference: ST593715
- Unitary authority: Bristol
- Ceremonial county: Bristol
- Region: South West
- Country: England
- Sovereign state: United Kingdom
- Post town: BRISTOL
- Postcode district: BS3
- Dialling code: 0117
- Police: Avon and Somerset
- Fire: Avon
- Ambulance: South Western
- UK Parliament: Bristol South

Windmill Hill is a hill, an inner suburban neighbourhood, and an electoral ward in Bristol, England. It is located south of the River Avon, southeast of Bedminster, north of Knowle and west of Totterdown. Victoria Park occupies the eastern half of the hill.

Windmill Hill is a predominantly residential location, and became popular in the 1990s and 2000s with students, artists and environmentalists, often sharing rented accommodation. The area has mainly Victorian terraced houses though there are also two residential tower blocks Polden and Holroyd House. In the early years of the 21st century the area started undergoing gentrification which has increased house prices in the area. Windmill Hill remains a creative and community driven neighbourhood. Windmill Hill's Community Centre was opened in the 1970s in the former church hall of St Michael and All Angels church.

Windmill Hill is separated from the rest of Bedminster by the Bristol to Exeter line railway (including Bedminster railway station) and industrial estates, as well as the Windmill Hill City Farm. The River Malago runs through the western edge of Windmill Hill ward.

== Electoral ward ==
Windmill Hill
- ward Bristol City Council
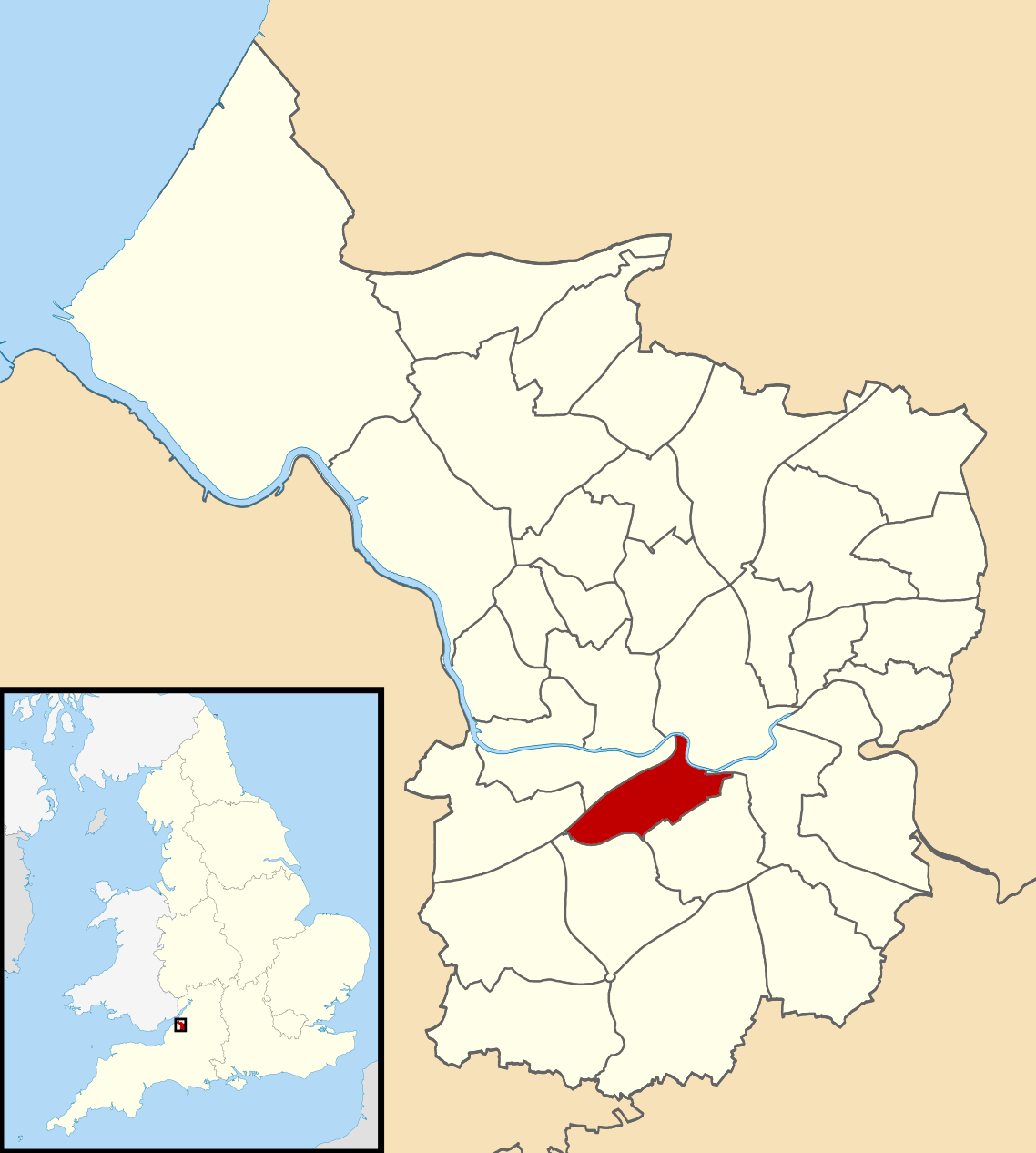
- Ward boundaries since 2016.
- County: Bristol
- Population: 13,958
- Electorate: 10,302

Current ward
- Created: 1980
- Councillor: Lisa Stone (Green)
- Councillor: Ed Plowden (Green)
- UK Parliament constituency: Bristol South

Windmill Hill electoral ward created in 1980, covers a broader area than the hill itself. Since 2016, the boundaries have encompassed Totterdown, the south-eastern part of Bedminster, and the Ravenhill Road area of Lower Knowle. It is represented by two members on Bristol City Council, which as of 2024 are Lisa Stone and Ed Plowden of the Green Party of England and Wales.

Councillors representing Windmill Hill ward since 2016
Elected	Councillor	Party	Electorate	Turnout
2024	Lisa Stone	Green	10,302	47.29%
2024	Ed Plowden	Green	10,302	47.29%
2021	Ed Plowden	Green	10,642	50.97%
2021	Lisa Stone	Green	10,642	50.97%
2016	Lucy Whittle	Labour	9,844	50.99%
2016	John Wellington	Labour	9,844	50.99%
