= Simon Cook (actor) =

British politician (born 1972)

Simon Cook MBE

Leader of Bristol City Council
- In office 15 May 2012 – 18 November 2012
- Deputy: Jon Rogers
- Preceded by: Barbara Janke
- Succeeded by: George Ferguson

Leader of Liberal Democrat Group on Bristol City Council
- In office 8 May 2012 – December 2012
- Deputy: Jon Rogers
- Preceded by: Barbara Janke
- Succeeded by: Tim Kent

Member of Bristol City Council for Clifton East
- In office 6 May 1999 – 5 May 2016
- Preceded by: Ward created
- Succeeded by: Clive Stevens

Personal details
- Born: Simon Timothy Cook; 21 June 1952 (age 74) Norwich, Norfolk, England, UK
- Party: Liberal Democrat
- Spouse: Barbara
- Children: Josh & Ellie
- Education: Norwich School
- Alma mater: University of Sussex
- Occupation: Politician
- Profession: Actor

Simon Timothy Cook MBE (born 21 June 1952) is a British politician and television actor, best known for his role as Andrew Warrington in the Five soap opera Family Affairs between 2000 and 2001.

== Biography ==
He attended Norwich School before studying English at the University of Sussex. He spent six years in business management before taking an acting course at the Bristol Old Vic Theatre School.

Cook has had roles in EastEnders, Doctors, Casualty, and Cal. He has also performed with the Royal Shakespeare Company.

=== Politics ===
He is also a Liberal Democrat politician, being a member of Bristol City Council from 1999 till losing in 2021, representing the Clifton East ward. He has served as Cabinet Member for Culture and Leisure and as Lord Mayor of Bristol (2004–2005) and as Deputy Leader of Council (2005–2006 and 2009–2012). As of 8 May 2012, he was the leader of the Liberal Democrat Group and also Leader of the council. In November 2012, the position of Leader of the council was to be replaced by a directly elected Mayor of Bristol. Which was won by Bristol 1st member George Ferguson.

Cook is the director of a small company that makes video and audio podcasts.

== Filmography ==
Year	Film	Role	Other notes
2013	Cal	Oncologist (rumored)	
Year	Television series	Role	Other notes
1974	Apple's Way	Boy	TV series, 1 episode
1989	London's Burning	1st Policeman	TV series, 1 episode
1990	The Chief	Chief Insp. Ian Maidment	TV series, 1 episode
1990	Grange Hill	Chemist Shop Manager	TV series, 1 episode
1991	Devices and Desires	Patrick Mitchell	TV mini-series, 3 episodes
1991–1992	Watt on Earth	Tom Ruddock	TV series, 24 episodes
1997	The Uninvited	Mark Knowles	TV series, 2 episodes
1997	Wycliffe	Geesink	TV series, 1 episode
1998	Touch and Go	Mark	(TV movie)
1998	The Bill	Magistrates Clerk	TV series, 1 episode
1999	Trial & Retribution	Newscaster	TV series, 1 episode
2000	Family Affairs	Andrew Warrington	TV series, 30 episodes
2009	Mistresses	Mr. Feniman	TV series, 1 episode
2001	Doctors	Tony Wickton	TV series, 1 episode
2003	Casualty	Dave Harrison	TV series, 1 episode
2007	Waking the Dead	Anthony Lane-Kelly	TV series, 1 episode
2010	Identity	Bathurst	TV mini-series, 1 episode
2011	Injustice	Judge	TV mini-series, 2 episodes
2013	Frankie	Mark Hughes	TV series, 1 episode
2017	Three Girls	Barrister	TV mini-series, 1 episode
2017	Broadchurch	Nick Foulkes	TV series, 1 episode

Political offices
Preceded by Barbara Janke	Leader of Bristol City Council; 2012	Succeeded by George Ferguson as Mayor of Bristol
Party political offices
Preceded by Barbara Janke	Leader of Liberal Democrat Group on Bristol City Council; 2012	Succeeded by Tim Kent
Civic offices
Preceded by William Martin	Lord Mayor of Bristol; 2004 – 2005	Succeeded by Peter Abraham
