= Steve Comer =

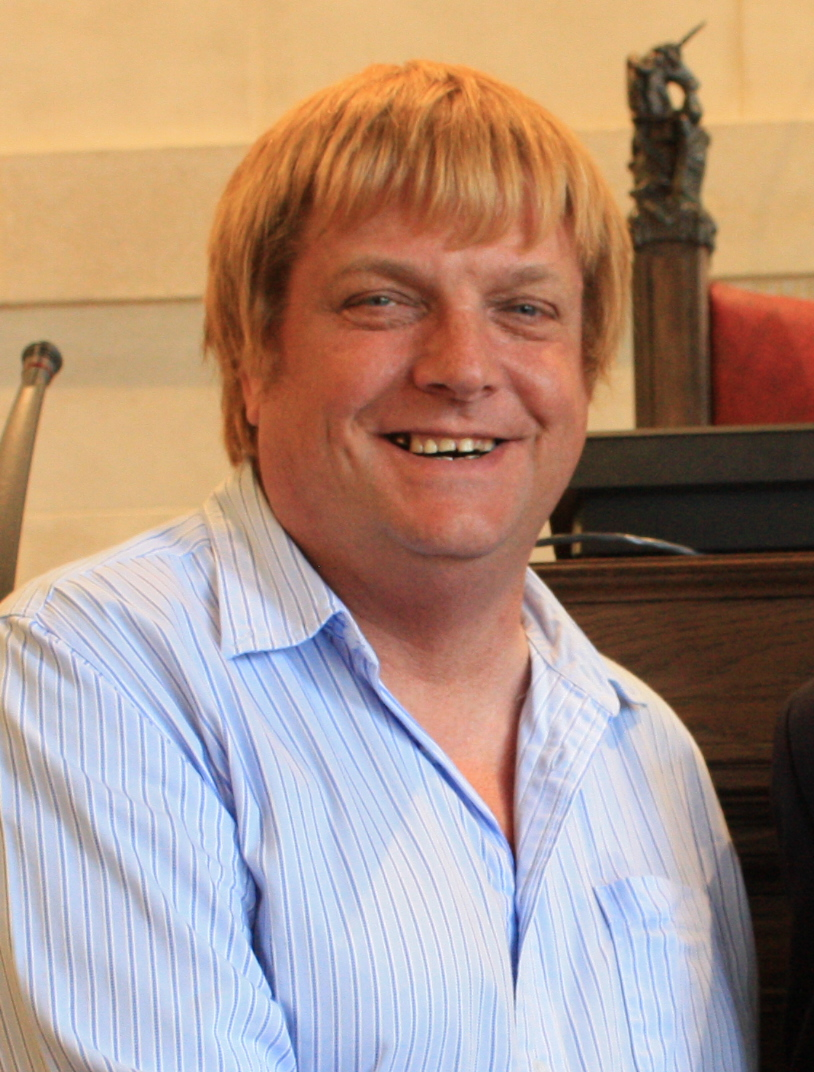

Leader of Liberal Democrat Group on Bristol City Council
- In office 5 May 2007 – 29 April 2008
- Deputy: Jon Rogers
- Preceded by: Barbara Janke
- Succeeded by: Barbara Janke

Member of Bristol City Council for Eastville
- In office 5 May 2005 – 2 May 2013
- Preceded by: Jude Patterson
- Succeeded by: Mhairi Threlfall

Member of Bristol City Council for Easton
- In office 5 May 1983 – 7 May 1987
- Preceded by: J Jones
- Succeeded by: K. Mahoney

Personal details
- Born: January 1956 (age 70) Bristol, England, UK
- Party: Liberal Democrat (1989–present)
- Other political affiliations: Liberal Party (1974–1989)

Steve Comer is a former leader of the Liberal Democrats on Bristol City Council in Bristol, United Kingdom. He was Councillor for Eastville ward from 2005 to 2013, having previously served as Councillor for the adjacent Easton ward (1983-7). He lost by a single vote to a Labour candidate in 2013.

== Background ==
Comer was born in Bristol, but has lived in a number of places, mostly in the south west of the UK. He is employed as a civil servant, and first became active in politics as a teenager, joining the Liberal Party at 18.

Comer is an active trade unionist, and is a member of the PCS Democrats group, formerly on the national executive of the PCS Union, to which he was first elected in 2000. He has been a union representative at local, regional and national level since 1989 in a variety of negotiating posts.

== Politics ==
At the 2005 elections, the Liberal Democrat party became the largest party and took minority control of the Council. Comer joined the new cabinet team on the council, and was elected deputy leader in 2006. In May 2007 he replaced Barbara Janke as leader of the party, and was expected to become leader of the Council but was blocked by a combined Conservative and Labour vote, who installed a Labour leader instead.

At a Council meeting in May 2007 Comer proposed the establishment of a select committee on prostitution. Labour and the Conservatives blocked the proposal, saying the council lacked the funding or the staff who could be dedicated solely to such a specific problem.

In 2013 Comer lost by a single vote in a very close election that saw the Labour Party complain that he was being racist in pointing out that the Labour candidate was from Scotland and had no connection with Eastville.
