= Barbara Janke =

British teacher and politician

The Right Honourable The Baroness Janke
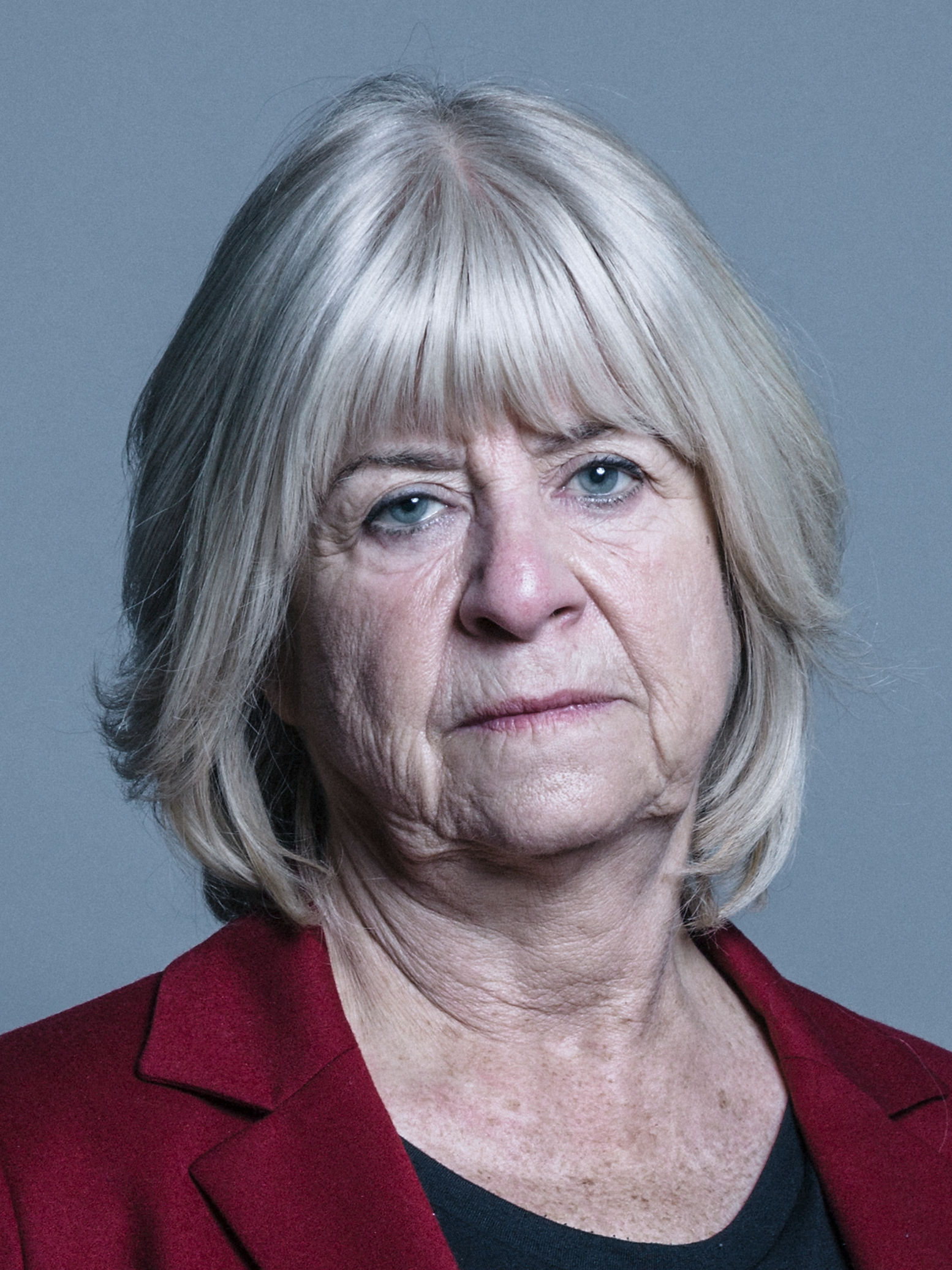

Leader of Bristol City Council
- In office 24 February 2009 – 15 May 2012
- Deputy: Simon Cook
- Preceded by: Helen Holland
- Succeeded by: Simon Cook
- In office May 2005 – 15 May 2007
- Deputy: Simon Cook (2005–2006); Steve Comer (2006–2007)
- Preceded by: Peter Hammond
- Succeeded by: Helen Holland
- In office 17 June 2003 – 9 November 2004
- Deputy: Peter Hammond; Peter Abraham
- Preceded by: Diane Bunyan
- Succeeded by: Peter Hammond

Leader of Liberal Democrat Group on Bristol City Council
- In office 29 April 2008 – 8 May 2012
- Deputy: Simon Cook
- Preceded by: Steve Comer
- Succeeded by: Simon Cook
- In office 15 May 1997 – 5 May 2007
- Deputy: Simon Cook (–2006); Steve Comer (2006–2007)
- Preceded by: Stephen Williams
- Succeeded by: Steve Comer

Member of the House of Lords
- Lord Temporal
- Life peerage 24 September 2014

Member of Bristol City Council for Clifton
- In office 4 May 1995 – 7 May 2015
- Preceded by: A. Tasker
- Succeeded by: Jerome Thomas

Personal details
- Born: Barbara Lilian Janke; 5 June 1947 (age 79) Liverpool, Lancashire, UK
- Party: Liberal Democrats
- Occupation: Teacher

Barbara Lilian Janke, Baroness Janke (born 5 June 1947) is a British former teacher and politician. She was the Liberal Democrat leader of Bristol City Council from 2005 to 2007 and from 2009 to 2012. She was first elected councillor for Clifton ward in 1995. She became leader of the Liberal Democrat group in 1997, with a break from 2007 to 2008. In August 2014 Cllr Janke was named as one of six new Liberal Democrat working peers.

== Early life ==
Janke was born in Liverpool on 5 June 1947.

== Career ==
Janke formerly taught economics and modern languages in London.

=== Political career ===
She first became active in politics while in Scotland, before becoming a councillor and then deputy Leader in Kingston upon Thames Council in the early '90s.

Janke stood unsuccessfully as the Liberal Democrat candidate for the Surbiton Constituency at the 1992 General Election, losing to the Conservative Party candidate Richard Tracey.

==== Bristol ====
In 1995, she was elected councillor for Clifton ward in Bristol City Council. She succeeded Stephen Williams as leader of the Liberal Democrat group in 1997. In 2007, she was replaced by Steve Comer. However, she replaced him as leader in 2008.

Janke became the first non-Labour leader of Bristol City Council for many decades after the 2003 elections when she led an all-party administration after the Council went into no overall control. This arrangement collapsed in late 2004 when the Labour group withdrew and took minority control as the largest party. At the 2005 elections the Liberal Democrat party became the largest party and took minority control of the Council under Janke as Leader until 2007, when a combined vote of Labour and Conservatives voted them out. In February 2009, she returned to the position of leader of Bristol City Council, following the resignation of the Labour cabinet. She stood down as leader in May 2012 as she approached her 65th birthday, but remained a member of the council.

==== House of Lords ====
On 24 September 2014 Janke was created a life peeress taking the title Baroness Janke, of Clifton in the City and County of Bristol.
