= Ashley (Bristol ward) =

Electoral ward in Bristol, England

Coordinates: 51.4739°N 2.5819°W

- ward Bristol City Council
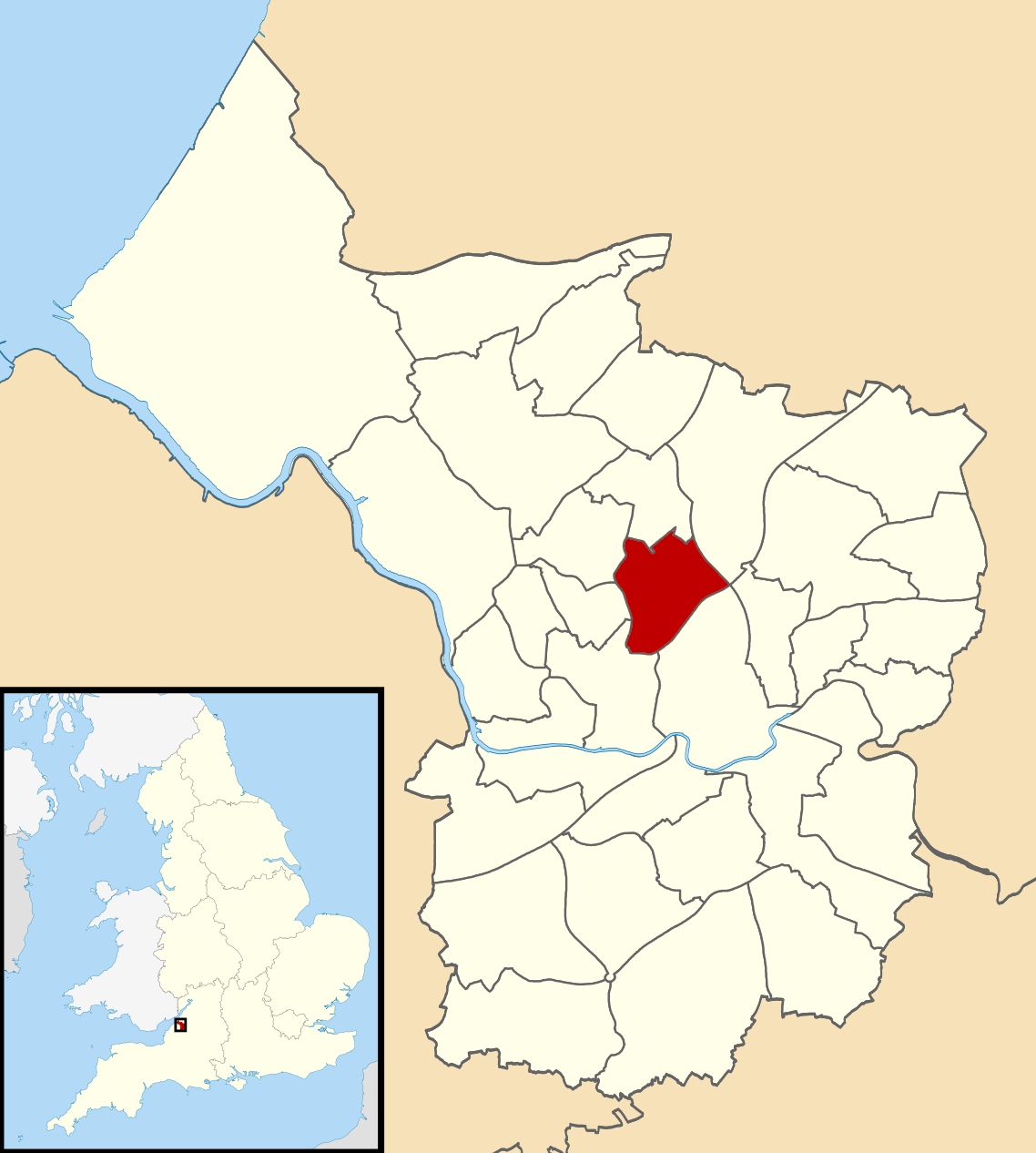
- Ward boundaries since 2016.
- County: Bristol
- Population: 20,003
- Electorate: 14,256

Current ward
- Created: 1980
- Councillor: Abdul Malik (Green)
- Councillor: Izzy Russell (Green)
- Councillor: Tim Wye (Green)
- UK Parliament constituency: Bristol Central

Ashley is an electoral ward in the city of Bristol, England. It is represented by three members on Bristol City Council, which as of 2024 are Abdul Malik, Izzy Russell and Tim Wye, all members of the Green Party of England and Wales.

The ward covers inner suburb areas immediately north of Bristol city centre, containing the neighbourhoods of Montpelier, St Andrews, St Paul's and St Werburgh's.

Ashley was created as a 2-member ward in 1980. The ward area was enlarged slightly in 2016, and it became a 3-member ward.

== Area profile ==
Ashley contains the neighbourhoods of Montpelier, St Andrews, St Paul's and St Werburgh's, along with parts of Baptist Mills and Stokes Croft. Its southern boundary is Bristol's inner ring road; the south-eastern boundary is the M32 motorway and its extension, Newfoundland Road; to the north-east it is Filton Bank railway; and to the west is the A38 road (Stokes Croft, Cheltenham Road and Gloucester Road); to the north, the boundary winds along residential streets including Sommerville Road, Sefton Park Road and Stoney Lane.

The area is primarily older inner suburban residential neighbourhoods, with most households living in terraced housing (32.5%) or apartments (55%). Demographically, the ward is diverse. Residents are more likely to be BAME (30.2%) than the Bristol average (19.9%). The age profile of the ward has a larger proportion of young adults (20-39) than the Bristol age profile.

On measures of relative deprivation, the is wide variation between areas in the ward, from St Pauls Grosvenor Road, which is in the most deprived decile of English areas, to Ashley Hill, which is in the least deprived quartile. The area typically scores highly on indicators of quality of life, with 85.1% of residents saying that they are satisfied with their local area, compared to the Bristol average of 75.1%. The exceptions to this are crime, with 11.6% of residents satisfied with how crime is tackled locally, compared with a Bristol average of 22.3%; pollution, with 94.7% of residents feeling that air quality and traffic pollution is a problem in the ward, compared with a Bristol average of 70.1; and transport, with only 22.2% of residents satisfied with the bus service (37.5% Bristol average), and 84.7% feeling that traffic congestion is a problem (74.4% Bristol average).

== Election history ==
=== 2024 election ===
Ashley (3 seats)
Party	Candidate	Votes	%	±%
Green	Izzy Russell	3,763	60.36	+4.97
Green	Abdul Malik	3,691	59.21	+26.48
Green	Tim Wye*	3,506	56.24	+25.85
Labour	Amira Cole*	2,446	39.24	−3.64
Labour	Susannah Harlow	1,991	31.94	+1.62
Labour	Issac Evans	1,762	28.26	+6.98
Liberal Democrats	Ian Harris	212	3.40	−13.38
Independent	Robbie Bentley	135	2.17	−0.68
Conservative	Yasmin Sealy	135	2.17	−23.41
Liberal Democrats	Beverley Knott	133	2.13	−11.98
Conservative	Allison Judge	120	1.92	−11.42
Conservative	Charles Stuart	112	1.80	−1.36
Liberal Democrats	Philip Kemp	106	1.70	−1.61
Turnout		6,234	43.73	−4.64
Green gain from Labour				
Green hold				
Green hold				

=== 2021 election ===
Ashley (3 seats)
Party	Candidate	Votes	%	±%
Green	Tim Wye	3,820	55.39	+17.16
Labour	Amirah Cole	2,957	42.88	+3.58
Green	Jude English	2,257	39.98	+4.08
Green	Will Mountford	2,096	30.39	+0.48
Labour	Sibusiso Tshabalala	2,091	30.32	−8.94
Conservative	Marcus Bruton	1,764	25.58	+22.11
Labour	Carole Johnson	1,468	21.29	−10.81
Liberal Democrats	Ian Harris	1,157	16.78	−2.14
Liberal Democrats	Tara Murray	973	14.11	+3.76
Conservative	James Mills	920	13.34	+10.47
Liberal Democrats	Robert Bristow	228	3.31	−5.38
Conservative	Oscar Lucas	218	3.16	+0.41
TUSC	Chris Farrell	204	2.96	−3.32
Independent	Robbie Bentley	196	2.84	+2.84
Turnout		6,896	48.37	−3.01
Green gain from Labour				
Labour hold				
Green hold				

=== 2016 election ===
Ashley (3 seats)
Party	Candidate	Votes	%	±%
Labour	Mike Davies	2,574	39.30	
Labour	Carole Johnson	2,571	39.26	
Green	Jude English	2,504	38.23	
Green	Gus Hoyt	2,351	35.90	
Labour	John Halpin	2,102	32.10	
Green	Simon Ingham Stafford-Townsend	1,959	29.91	
Liberal Democrats	Jon Rogers	1,239	18.92	
Liberal Democrats	Maya Sturtridge	678	10.35	
Liberal Democrats	Adam Sturtridge	569	8.69	
TUSC	Chris Farrell	411	6.28	
Conservative	Marcus Bruton	227	3.47	
Conservative	George Pendrill Maggs	188	2.87	
Conservative	Fi Riches	180	2.75	
Turnout		6,549	51.38	
Labour win (new seat)				
Labour win (new seat)				
Green win (new seat)				

=== 2015 election ===
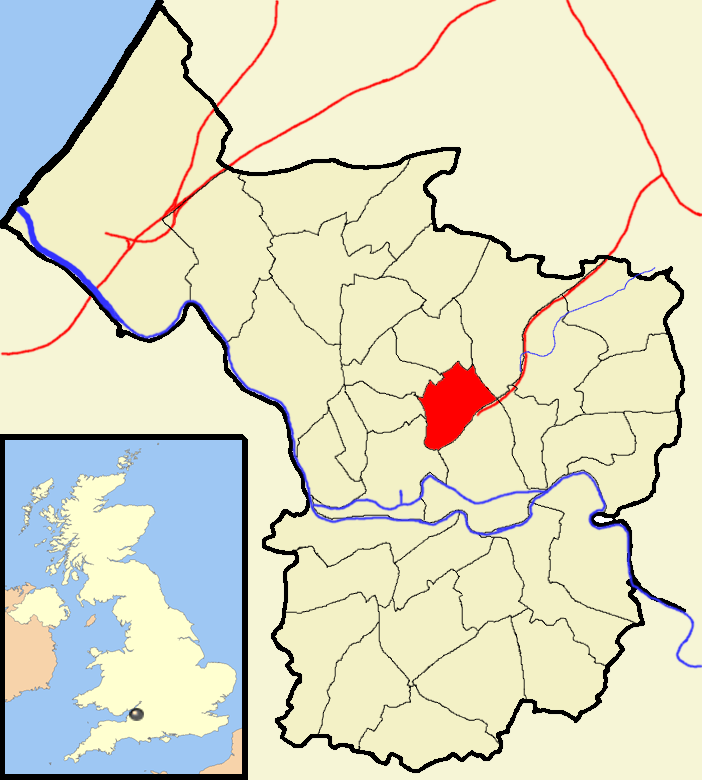
Ward boundaries until 2016.

Bristol City Council Elections: Ashley Ward 2015
Party	Candidate	Votes	%	±%
Green	Gus Hoyt	4,470	51.48	+16.94
Labour	Mary Southcott	2,480	28.56	−1.26
Liberal Democrats	Nura Aabe	1,085	12.50	−15.97
Conservative	Owen James Evans	514	5.92	+3.07
TUSC	Ian Chard	134	1.54	+0.16
Majority		1990	22.92	+18.2
Green hold		Swing	+9.1	

=== 2013 election ===
Bristol City Council Elections: Ashley Ward 2013
Party	Candidate	Votes	%	±%
Green	Rob Telford	1,223	34.54	−8.11
Labour	Mary Caroline Southcott	1,056	29.82	+4.65
Liberal Democrats	Jon Charles Rogers	1,008	28.47	+0.78
Conservative	Iain Jenkins Dennis	101	2.85	−1.64
Independents for Bristol	Karl Belizaire	76	2.15	N/A
TUSC	Tom Baldwin	49	1.38	N/A
Birthday Party	Dave Dobbs	28	0.79	N/A
Majority		167	4.72	−10.24
Green gain from Liberal Democrats		Swing	-6.38	
