= Whitchurch Park (ward) =

Coordinates: 51.41°N 2.585°W

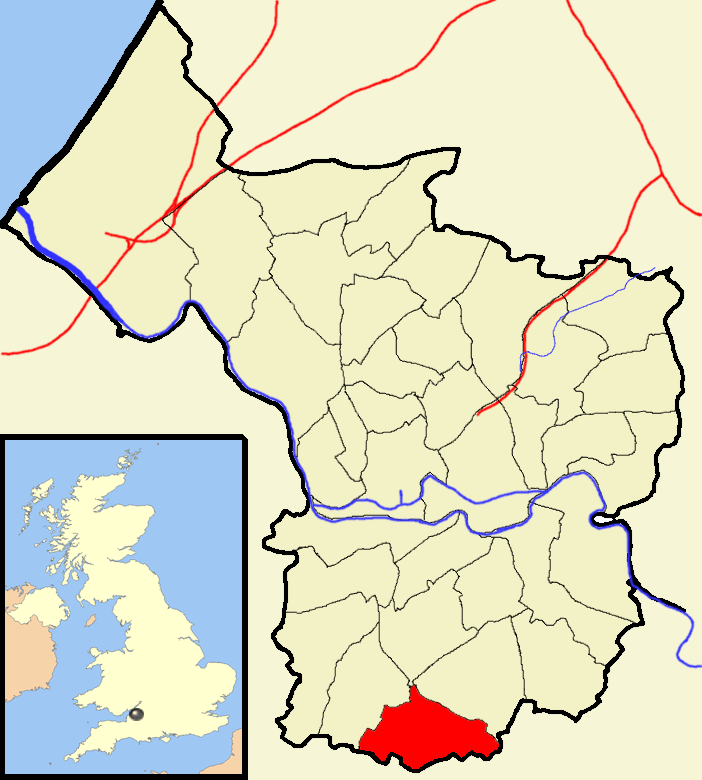
- Boundaries of the city council ward.

- Location within Bristol
- Population: 10,839 (2011.Ward)
- Unitary authority: Bristol
- Ceremonial county: Bristol
- Region: South West
- Country: England
- Sovereign state: United Kingdom
- Post town: BRISTOL
- Postcode district: BS14
- Dialling code: 01275
- Police: Avon and Somerset
- Fire: Avon
- Ambulance: South Western
- UK Parliament: Bristol South

Whitchurch Park is a council ward located in the south of the city of Bristol in England. It includes the eastern part of Hartcliffe and the western part of Whitchurch. The ward has a population of 11,061 people.

== Religion ==
7,683 people, or 69.5% of the population are Christians. This is a higher figure than the average for the city of Bristol. 21% of people identified themselves as non religious, while 7.8% did not state their religion in the census. The figures for all other religions were below 1%.

== Politics ==
The ward is in the Bristol South constituency for representation in the House of Commons. The councillors for the ward are Timothy Kent (Liberal Democrat) and Helen Holland (Labour)
