= Subdivisions of Bristol =

Areas in British city

The city of Bristol, England, is divided into many areas, which often overlap or have non-fixed borders. These include Parliamentary constituencies, council wards and unofficial neighbourhoods. There are no civil parishes in Bristol.

== Parliamentary constituencies ==
Bristol is divided into five constituencies for the purpose of Parliamentary representation. These are:

- Bristol Central
- Bristol East
- Bristol South
- Bristol North East
- Bristol North West

Previous constituencies were Bristol North, Bristol South East and Bristol West.

== Council wards ==
The city is split into 34 wards for local government. Like the parliamentary constituencies, their borders are rigidly defined.

- Ashley
- Avonmouth
- Bedminster
- Bishopston
- Bishopsworth
- Brislington East
- Brislington West
- Central
- Clifton
- Clifton Down
- Cotham
- Easton
- Eastville
- Filwood
- Frome Vale
- Hartcliffe and Withywood
- Henbury and Brentry
- Hengrove and Whitchurch Park
- Hillfields
- Horfield
- Hotwells and Harbourside
- Knowle
- Lawrence Hill
- Lockleaze
- Redland
- Southmead
- Southville
- St George Central
- St George Troopers Hill
- St George West
- Stockwood
- Stoke Bishop
- Westbury-on-Trym and Henleaze
- Windmill Hill

== Neighbourhoods ==
The neighbourhoods of Bristol do not have fixed boundaries as they are mainly informal areas. Some of these areas overlap, or are contained within others, while others have more than one name.

The following areas and towns make up the city of Bristol and its outskirts. It includes some adjoining areas of South Gloucestershire, marked ^{SG}, North Somerset, marked ^{NS}, Bath and North East Somerset, marked ^{BANES}.

- Bristol city centre
- Almondsbury^{SG}
- Alveston^{SG}
- Arnos Vale
- Ashley Down
- Ashton Vale
- Avonmouth
- Aztec West^{SG}
- Baptist Mills
- Barrs Court^{SG}
- Barton Hill
- Bedminster
- Bedminster Down
- Begbrook
- Bishopston
- Bishopsworth
- Blaise Hamlet
- Botany Bay
- Bower Ashton
- Bradley Stoke^{SG}
- Brandon Hill
- Brentry
- Brislington
- Broadmead
- Broomhill
- Broom Hill
- Canon's Marsh
- Chester Park
- Cheswick^{SG}
- Clay Hill
- Clifton
- Coombe Dingle
- Cotham
- Crew's Hole
- Crofts End
- Downend^{SG}
- Easter Compton^{SG}
- Eastville
- Easton
- Emersons Green^{SG}
- Failand^{NS}
- Filton^{SG}
- Filwood Park
- Fishponds
- Frampton Cotterell^{SG}
- Golden Hill
- Greenbank
- Hambrook^{SG}
- Hanham^{SG}
- Hartcliffe
- Headley Park
- Henbury
- Hengrove
- Henleaze
- Hillfields
- Horfield
- Hotwells
- Iron Acton^{SG}
- Kensington Park
- Keynsham^{BANES}
- Kingsdown
- Kingswood^{SG}
- Knowle
- Knowle West
- Lawrence Hill
- Lawrence Weston
- Lewin's Mead
- Lockleaze
- Lodge Hill
- Longwell Green^{SG}
- Long Ashton^{NS}
- Mangotsfield^{SG}
- Mayfield Park
- Monks Park
- Montpelier
- Moorfields
- Nailsea^{NS}
- Netham
- Newtown
- North Common^{SG}
- Oldland Common
- Patchway^{SG}
- Pill^{NS}
- Portishead^{NS}
- Pucklechurch^{SG}
- Redcliffe
- Redfield
- Redland
- Ridgeway
- Sea Mills
- Severn Beach^{SG}
- Shirehampton
- Sneyd Park
- Southmead
- Southville
- Speedwell
- Spike Island
- St Agnes
- St Andrews
- St Anne's
- St George
- St Jude's
- St Paul's
- St Philip's Marsh
- St Werburghs
- Staple Hill^{SG}
- Stapleton
- Stockwood
- Stoke Bishop
- Stokes Croft
- Stoke Gifford^{SG}
- Stoke Lodge^{SG}
- Thornbury^{SG}
- Totterdown
- Two Mile Hill
- Tyndall's Park
- Upper Knowle
- Victoria Park
- Warmley^{SG}
- Westbury-on-Trym
- Westbury Park
- Whitchurch
- Whitehall
- Willsbridge^{SG}
- Windmill Hill
- Winterbourne^{SG}
- Withywood
- Yate^{SG}

== See also ==
- Politics of Bristol
