= Lakeshore, Bristol =

Development of flats in south Bristol, England

Lakeshore
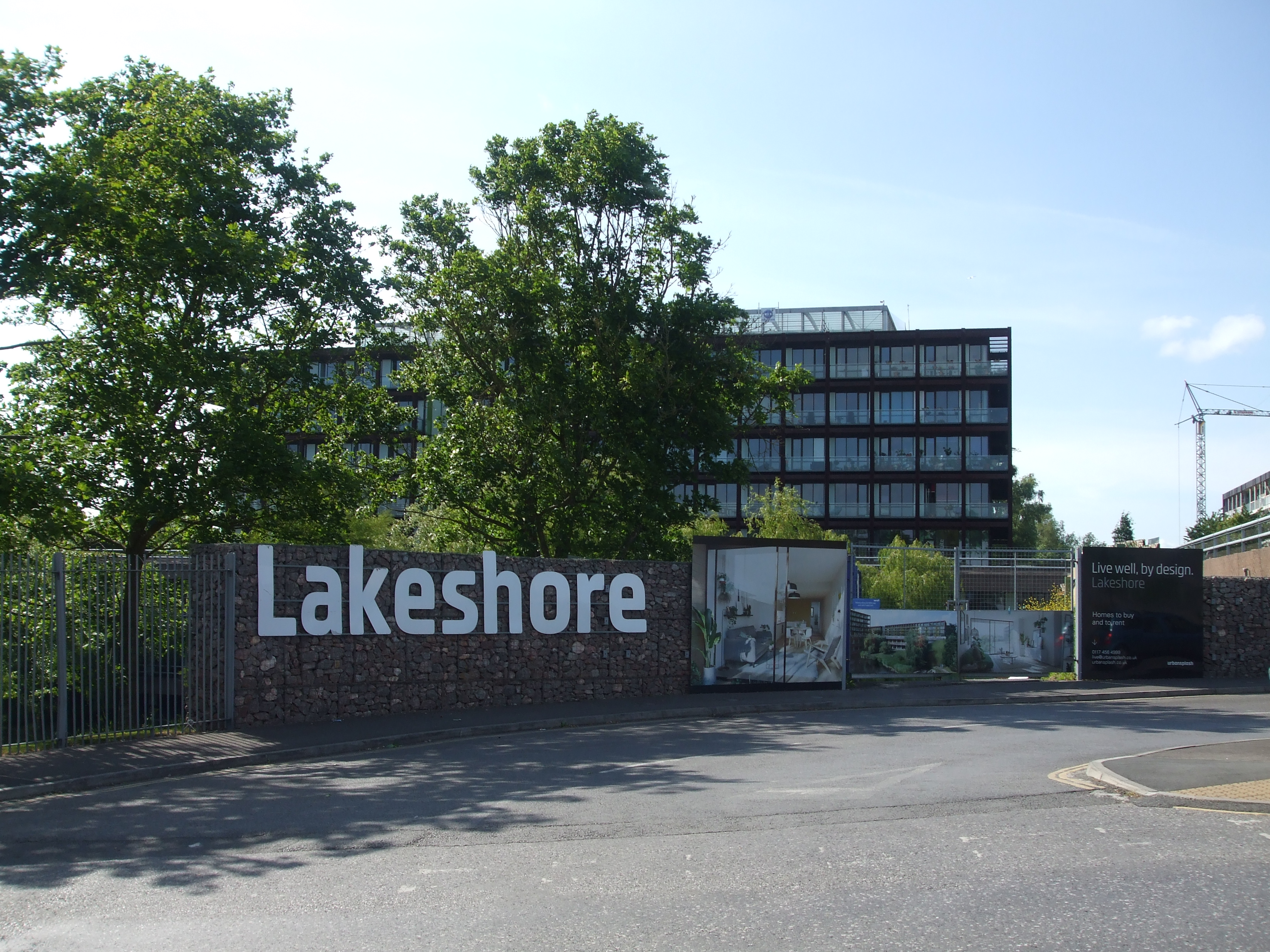

- Location within Bristol
- 51°24′54″N 2°36′11″W
- Location: Bishopsworth, Bristol, England

History
- Built: 1967
- Built for: W.D. & H.O. Wills
- Rebuilt: 2007-2012

Site notes
- Area: 4.5 hectares (11 acres)
- Architect(s): Skidmore, Owings & Merrill in conjunction with York Rosenberg Mardell

Listed Building – Grade II
- Official name: Office building at W D and H O Wills Factory, with linked bus stop
- Designated: 2 May 2000
- Reference no.: 1380423

Lakeshore is a development of flats in the Bishopsworth area of south Bristol, England. It is a Grade II listed building.

The building uses a structure of Cor-Ten Steel which is left from the headquarters building of Imperial Tobacco which was built in the 1960s. The tobacco factory and offices closed by 1990 and were partially demolished, before being given listed status and then left for ten years. The surrounding factory has been demolished and is now the site of a shopping centre.

The new development of 422 homes and its surrounding landscapes grounds and facilities has been built in a sustainable way, including the use of geothermal energy. The development has won prizes for design and environmentally friendly approach.

== Location ==
Lakeshore is located in Bishopsworth 2.5 to 3 miles from Bristol City Centre, 2 miles from Temple Meads railway station and 6 miles from Bristol Airport. There is a cycle route into the city centre via Crox Bottom Park, Hartcliffe Way and Bedminster.

The site is irregular in shape and comprised 4.5 hectares (11 acres) in total. It is bordered by the road to the North and the soon to be called ‘Lakeshore Drive’ to the East, Hengrove Way to the South and Crox Bottom Park to the West. The current buildings are on a site occupied, until the 1960s, by Crox Bottom farm. The farm stopped its activities in 1962. Crox Bottom is a public open space at the edge of Hartcliffe and Headley Park and has been proposed as a Site of Nature Conservation Interest in the Bristol Local Plan. The Pigeonhouse Stream runs through the site.

The main route through the site is part of the Malago Greenway, a cyclist/pedestrian route which connects South Central Bristol with Hartcliffe and Withywood. Crox Bottom is a destination for the local Healthy Walking Group. Bristol City Council has undertaken a regeneration programme for the area of South Bristol to create a range of facilities to residents and opportunities for businesses and employment. Imperial Park is next to Lakeshore and contains shops, restaurants and a health and fitness centre. Nearby is also the South Bristol skills academy and Knowle West Media Centre, a charity that develops and supports cultural, social and economic regeneration. Zion is a local community centre nearby offering a range of community facilities and events. 2012 has seen the opening of the Hengrove leisure centre and South Bristol Community Hospital.

== History ==
Lakeshore was commissioned in 1967 by Imperial Tobacco whose empire included Bristol tobacco company W.D. & H.O. Wills. They announced the relocation of their Tobacco Factory from Bedminster to Hartcliffe in the late 1960s. The building was designed by Chicago architects Skidmore, Owings & Merrill as well as UK architects Yorke Rosenberg Mardall. They were inspired by modernist architect Ludwig Mies van der Rohe, who designed the Lake Shore Drive Apartments in Chicago. The clean sculptural expression and rationality of the design are key features of his style.

Imperial Tobacco imported the office architecture of Skidmore Owings Merill and built a state of the art factory for preparing, packing and storing cigarettes, along with an HQ office building with ancillary facilities for the staff. Wills acquired the Hartcliffe site and in 1974 started operation of Europe's largest cigarette factory. It was of futuristic design being clad in Cor-Ten steel, a material with an 800 year design life. The HQ office building housed a variety of facilities for the 4500 employees, ranging from restaurants, a bank, a supermarket and post office to a film theatre.

The Wills Imperial Tobacco Factory has an established history with art and it was Wills' policy that the building should always reflect contemporary art of its time. In the 1970s large banners were commissioned by six artists; Valerio Adami, Richard Smith, Jack Youngerman, Harold Burchman, Joe Tilson and Robyn Denny. They hung in offices throughout the building. Old photographs of Bristol were enlarged and a selection of pipes, old cigarette, tobacco and cigar label were hung in private offices in vacuum-formed Perspex box frames, all on coloured fabric mounts to match coloured chair upholstery. The Wills collections were works by 20th-century British artists and were hung in the director's suite. A collection of contemporary prints hung in various offices alongside a selection of oil portraits of past employees.

By 1990 the factory and office had closed following a takeover by Hanson plc, 16 years after it was opened. The factory was demolished in 1998 and made way for the current retail park; Imperial Park. The building was left and became subject to vandalism and arson. An attempt was made to demolish the building but English Heritage stepped in and listed the Grade II building for its architectural qualities in 2001 and it was placed on the Buildings at Risk Register. All that remained was the Cor-Ten steel frame and concrete structure and the neglected lake and landscape.

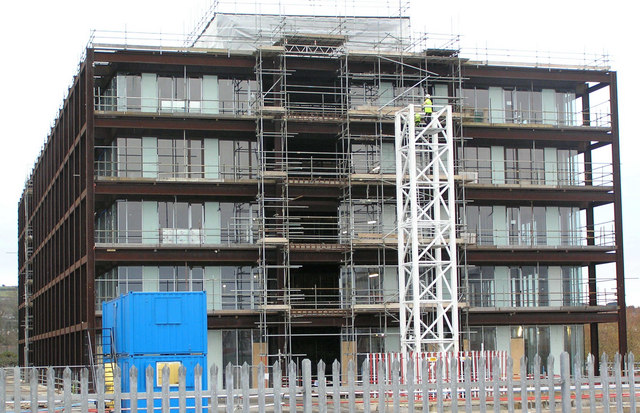
Building work to convert the old Imperial Tobacco Headquarters into flats

Urban Splash acquired the site in 2003 for £45 million, with £17.5 million of financial support from the Homes and Communities Agency. It received planning permission in 2006. Redevelopment commenced in 2007 and was slowed in October 2008 due to the economic crisis. Following a successful Kickstart Housing Delivery application, work restarted in February 2010 and is progressing to be finished by end of 2012. As of 19 February 2015, Urban Splash sold the freehold of the site to Adriatic Land 3 Limited.

Lakeshore won the Housing Design Award (NHBC, DETR, RTPI, RIBA) in 2007 for its design and sustainable features. It has also been shortlisted for the Guardian Sustainable Business, Best Practice Exchange and Sunday Times British Homes Awards

== Architecture ==
=== Building ===
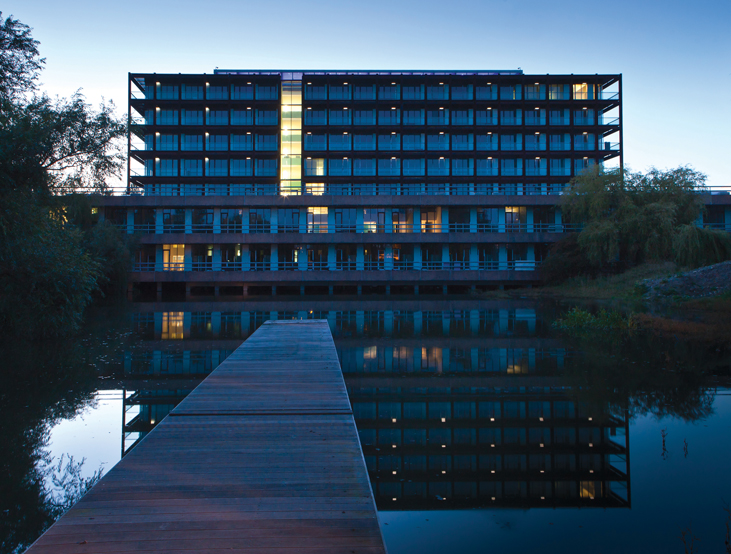
Lakeshore at night.

The block and podium were placed over a newly created lake set within a natural setting incorporating the original Crox Bottom farm, now a park, which was all part of the landscaping scheme by Kenneth Booth. The whole site was modelled in a modern idiom. The buildings were all defined by their metal structure and the scheme won awards from the Royal Institute of British Architects and British Steel Corporation.

The building had a futuristic look when it was originally completed in 1974. The building's structure is made from Cor-Ten steel used by the BSC under licence from the United States Steel Corporation. It is a weathering steel, which was first used in 1916 in America. It protects itself from progressive corrosion by oxidising on exposure to air and moisture. The protective film gradually darkens with time and assumes a pleasing texture and colour; if exposed near the sea the colour tends to be grey. In a polluted industrial environment it turns almost black and in the countryside it will look a cocoa colour.

The new building was designed by Ferguson Mann Architects who created apartment spaces with extra high ceilings, full height glazing, under floor heating and balconies. Other features include an apple orchard, wild flower meadows, country walks, a fishing club, bird and bat boxes, picnic and barbecue areas, a pontoon, table tennis, parking and allotments. There are 422 homes including studios, 1 and 2 bedroom apartments. 270 apartments are within the existing building, 127 in the Cor-Ten structure, 143 below the podium and 16 in the east wing of the existing building and 136 in the new. There are also 360 car parking spaces. 36 apartments were built for Housing Association, Aster Homes are located in the Cor-Ten phase of the existing building.

The original walkways have been kept but glass balustrades have been added to form balconies so the building looks almost exactly the same from the outside. A new entrance slot was created to the steel Cor-Ten building. An Ethylene tetrafluoroethylene (ETFE) atrium roof has been installed and this inflated pillow material is the same as the Eden Project's roof. The atrium is a social circulation space connecting the new and existing building via a new street running the entire length of the building below podium level.

The sustainable approach to the redevelopment has focused on passive measures to maximise light penetration and maximising thermal performance of all new walls and windows. Active measures include the use of geothermal boreholes, which feed a ground source heat pump system plus a biomass boiler, using waste timber material formed into woodchips, to provide heating and hot water via a centralised system. The ground source heat pump system consists of a network of 100 m deep boreholes, through which fluid is pumped. This combination of heating technologies ensures the building's supply of heating and hot water is virtually 100% renewable. The property also has low energy lighting throughout, low water installations and green Sedum roof to the new building, acting as a natural feature.

Lakeshore has sustainable drainage systems to external areas, recycling bins and centralised on-site recycling facilities. Lakeshore also recycled 90% of the concrete used. During the restoration of the lake, the contaminated silt was removed from lake and pumped into huge porous bags, which allowed the water to drain through. The silt was then remediated on site and the resultant soil integrated into the landscaping. During the construction the green guide was adopted as well as waste management strategies.

=== Landscaping ===
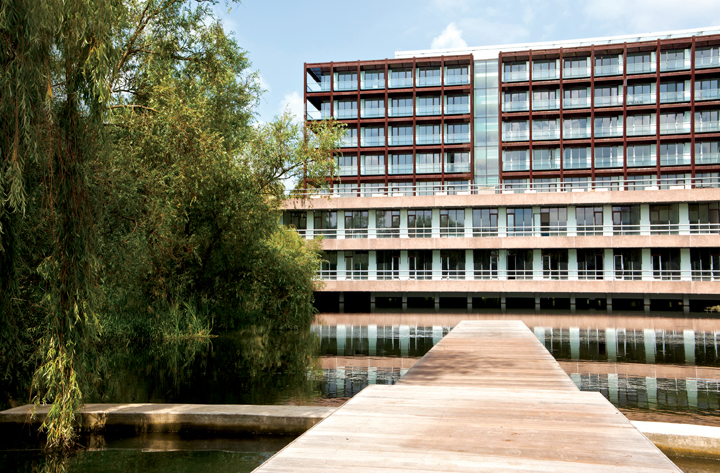
Lakeshore

Lakeshore is set amongst 10 acres of landscaped gardens and sits on top of a private lake. Kenneth Booth, the original landscaper, in the 1970s, designed the private garden for the Imperial Tobacco Factory HQ. The lake, which acted as the namesake for the new residential property is man-made.

The shared gardens are for social events and include barbecue and picnic areas, a fishing club, pontoon, woodland walks and a variation of wildlife. The lake was fully drained, decontaminated, silt removed, rubbish cleared and then restocked with fish. Wildlife is encouraged through protection of trees and provision of bird boxes and the woodland was repaired and the landscape enhanced. There are also proposals for permanent and temporary art installations.
