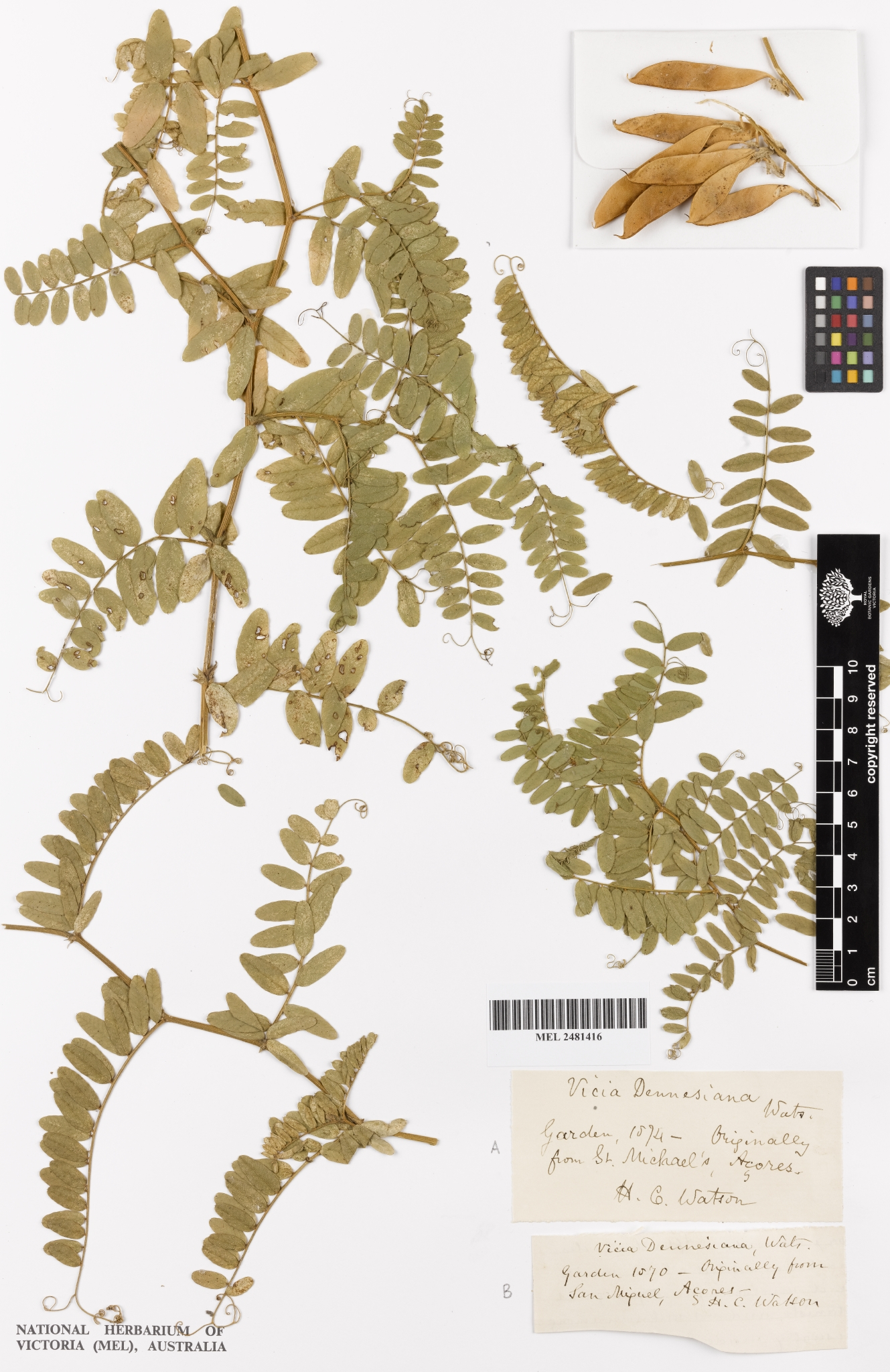

Scientific classification
- Kingdom: Plantae
- Clade: Tracheophytes
- Clade: Angiosperms
- Clade: Eudicots
- Clade: Rosids
- Order: Fabales
- Family: Fabaceae
- Subfamily: Faboideae
- Genus: Vicia
- Species: V. dennesiana

Binomial name
- Vicia dennesiana H.C.Watson

= Vicia dennesiana =

Species of plant

†Vicia dennesiana is a species in the Fabaceae family, named after the solicitor and plant collector George Edgar Dennes. It is protected by the Bern Convention on the Conservation of European Wildlife and Natural Habitats. This species has not been found in the wild since 1848, and is considered extinct in its natural habitat. It has not been observed in cultivation since 1922.

The habitat of the species is poorly known. The available data indicate that the species developed on the sheltered slopes of Serra da Tronqueira, São Miguel Island, Azores, but the population was subsequently destroyed in a landslide.

A cultivated population was maintained in the Thames Ditton garden of Hewett Cottrell Watson, the author who described the species. Several seeds were germinated and produced annually flowering and fruiting plants. In the winter, the plants were sheltered in a greenhouse to protect them from frost, and in the summer they were planted in the garden. However, at the end of May 1867, almost all of Watson's plants had died due to a late frost. One of the three surviving plants bloomed again in the summer of the next year, which made it possible to continue to cultivate the species. After Watson's death a specimen was transferred to the Royal Botanical Gardens of Kew. Due to unsuccessful propagation, today only herbarium specimens remain.

== Herbarium specimens ==
The Fielding-Druce Herbarium of Oxford University and the Kew Gardens Herbarium include specimens collected on Ilha de São Miguel. Preserved specimens of Vicia dennesiana cultivated by Watson are held by herbaria including the National Herbarium of Victoria Royal Botanic Gardens Victoria, and the Copenhagen University Botanical Museum.
