= Knowle West =

Neighbourhood in Bristol, England

Coordinates: 51.426°N 2.590°W

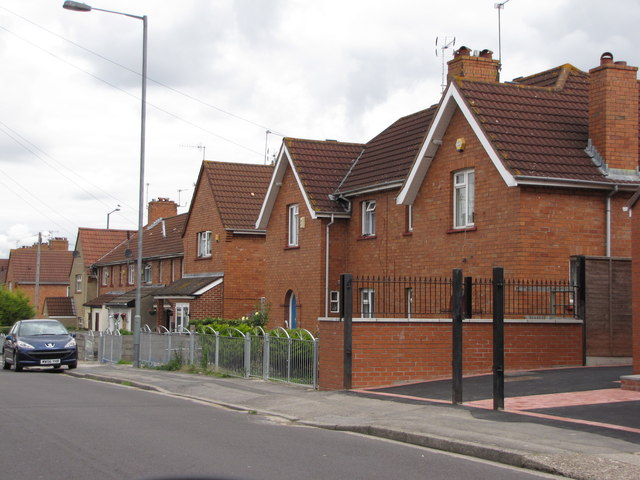
- 1930s council housing on Wexford Road

- Location within Bristol
- Area: 1.26 sq mi (3.3 km^{2})
- Population: 11,787
  - Density: 9,355/sq mi (3,612/km^{2})
- OS grid reference: ST603707
- Unitary authority: Bristol
- Region: South West
- Country: England
- Sovereign state: United Kingdom
- Post town: BRISTOL
- Postcode district: BS4
- Dialling code: 0117
- Police: Avon and Somerset
- Fire: Avon
- Ambulance: South Western
- UK Parliament: Bristol South

Knowle West is a neighbourhood in the south of Bristol, England, 2 miles (3 km) from the city centre, and mostly in the Filwood ward of Bristol City Council, although a small part of the estate lies within Knowle ward to the east. To the west are Bishopsworth and Hartcliffe, to the north Bedminster and Windmill Hill and to the south Whitchurch Park and Hengrove. In 2008, the population was 11,787.

There is evidence of late Iron Age and Roman settlements in the area. At the time of the Domesday Book, Knowle was a rural area assessed at a taxable value of two geld units. Knowle West remained rural in character until the 1930s, when a council estate was developed to provide homes for people displaced by slum clearance in the centre of the city.

Former residents include the musician Tricky, the England rugby player Ellis Genge, the boxer Dixie Brown and late 1950s rock and roll band The Eagles. The closure of the Imperial Tobacco factory at nearby Hartcliffe in 1990 caused a large number of job losses. Just under a third of the residents are classed as economically inactive and the area is the most economically deprived in Bristol.

== History ==
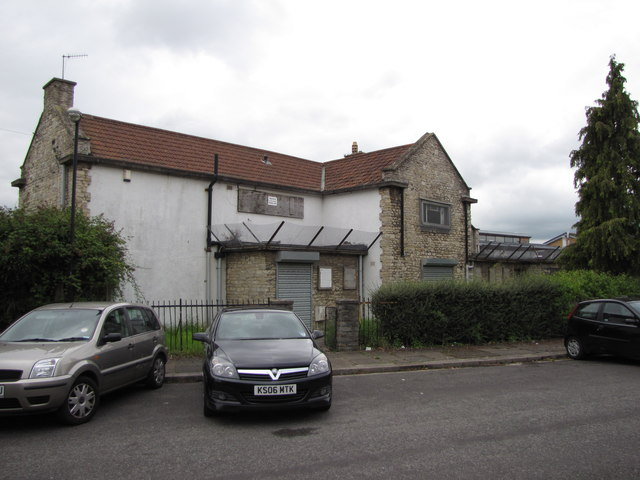
Former Holy Cross vicarage at Inns Court; a listed building now restored

There is evidence of late Iron Age and Roman settlement at Inns Court and Filwood Park, which lie within Knowle West. In 1086, the area that is now Knowle West was assessed by the Domesday survey as part of Knowle in the hundred of Hartcliffe. The survey shows Knowle as being under the lordship of Eadnoth the Constable who had 30 holdings in Devon, Dorset, Somerset and Wiltshire before the Norman conquest. After the conquest, Knowle became part of the holdings of Osbern Giffard, who was lord, or tenant in chief, of holdings throughout Gloucestershire, Hampshire, Wiltshire and Somerset. The Domesday Book shows Knowle as having eleven households, three ploughlands, one cob (small horse), eight cattle, twenty five pigs, a meadow of 16 acres (6.5 ha), pasture of 20 acres (8.1 ha) and a woodland area of 2.5 furlongs (500 m) by 1.5 furlongs (300 m). For taxation purposes, the whole was assessed at two geld units. Filwood Park, in the southern part of the area was part of the parish of Whitchurch until incorporated into Bristol in 1930. In Anglo-Saxon times Filwood Chase was part of the royal hunting estate known as Kingswood Forest, which encompassed a large area around Bristol.

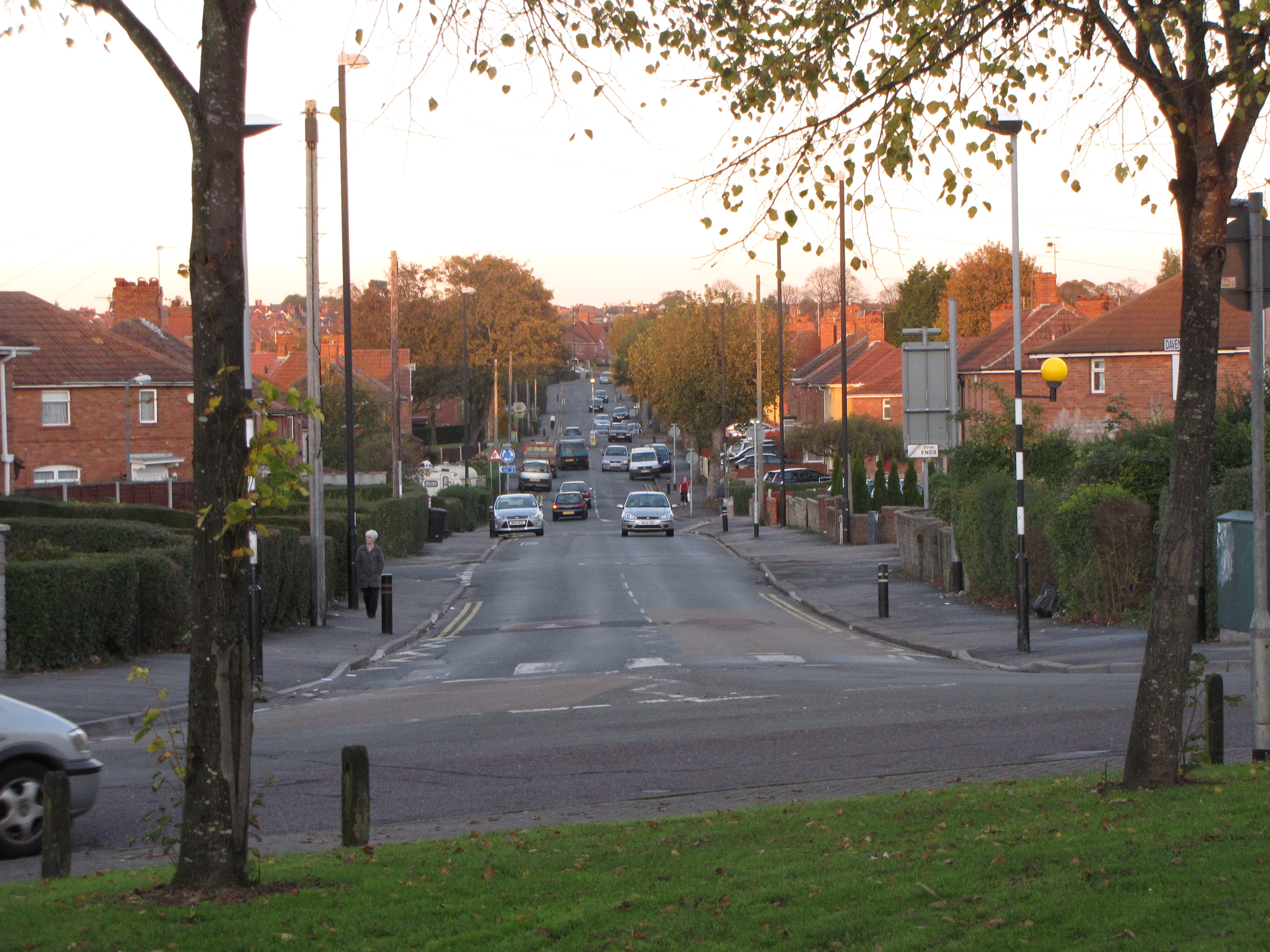
Daventry Road in the heart of the 1930s development looking east from Melvin Square

Inns Court and Filwood farms have medieval origins. The surviving parts of Inns Court, originally Inyn's Court, are now part of the former Holy Cross Inns Court Vicarage and the staircase turret is now a Grade II* listed building. The building is in the process of repair and is on the "at risk" register. An isolation hospital was built at Nover's Hill in 1892, eventually superseded by a new hospital at Ham Green, near Pill, which opened in 1927. The site is now occupied by the Knowle DGE (DGE standing for Discovery, Guidance and Enjoyment) Special School. In the 1920s, the area was still rural in nature, mostly agricultural and allotment land, including Filwood Farm, Inns Court Farm and Hengrove House. The old field boundaries influenced the subsequent development.

Knowle West was built in the 1930s as a council housing estate. It was constructed on garden city principles, with large gardens and "an abundance of fresh air and daylight." The aim of the development was to provide new homes for those who needed to be relocated as a result of clearance of inner-city slums in Bristol and "to provide healthier living conditions for large families on low incomes.

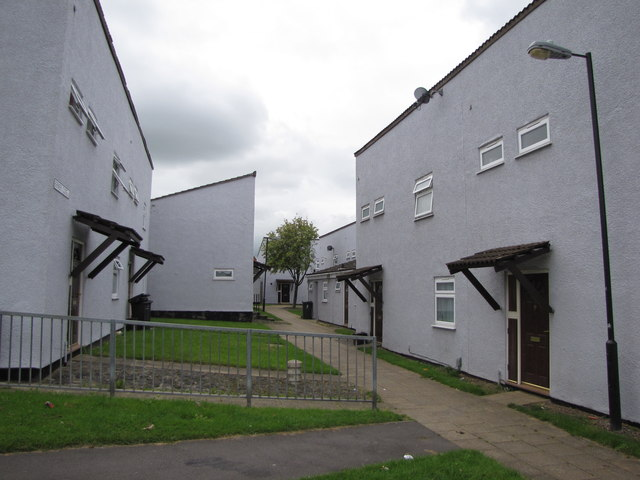
1960s council housing in Inns Court, built on the Radburn principles

A new wave of development commenced in the 1960s at Inns Court, occasioned by the need for more homes following the further clearance of inner city areas which had been devastated by the Bristol Blitz. Prefabricated homes, which had been erected since World War II at Filwood Park were demolished in the 1960s. Subsequently, new homes were built on the Radburn principles. "Common features were grouped houses arranged around a cul-de sac street layout thus the street layout broke away from the conventional street grid pattern", but this style of development is now considered to be a failure, due to the lack of "a safe and well-overlooked environment." The layout of housing built around short cul-de-sacs "has resulted in a physical environment that contributes to isolation rather than facilitating community interaction", according to a 2009 city council report on the area. By 2008, around 45 per cent of the 4,475 homes were owner occupied. Plans were announced in 2010 for demolition of 1,000 homes in Inns Court. Local residents were opposed to this, and following their campaign, the council withdrew the plans and met with residents to discuss plans for redeveloping Filwood Broadway with new shops and a supermarket.

== Location ==
Modern Knowle West has an area of approximately 1.26 square miles (3.3 km^{2}), located on a plateau about 215 feet (66 m) above sea level, (Note: Data from OS Landranger Map (1:50 000) Bristol & Bath Sheet 172, Ordnance Survey, 2005) south of the centre of Bristol, between the districts of Knowle on the east, Whitchurch Park and Hengrove to the south, Hartcliffe and Bishopsworth to the west and Bedminster and Windmill Hill to the north. There is steeply sloping land to the north and west, which together with Pigeonhouse Brook, a tributary of the River Malago, creates a natural barrier to adjacent areas. The underlying bedrock is of the Lias Group, a mixture of mudstones, marine limestones, sandstones and clays. The Bedminster Great coal seam lies some 2,952 feet (900 m) below the area, but it is considered unlikely that coal was mined underneath Knowle West. (Note: Data from Open Geoscience maps, British Geological Survey, 2011)

The local council Filwood ward is roughly coterminous with Knowle West, but two small areas of the estate lie in the neighbouring Knowle ward. Definitions of the area of Knowle West vary, with some residents in the eastern fringes preferring to identify with Knowle.

== Notable residents ==
The boxer Dixie Brown lived in Knowle West from the 1930s until the 1950s and was a regular at the Venture Inn, a public house in Melvin Square. He was frequently visited by black American troops during World War II.

The Eagles were a rock and roll band who formed in the late 1950s at the Eagle House youth club and featured in the 1962 film Some People.

The musician Tricky was a member of the Wild Bunch sound system and a contributor to Massive Attack's first two albums. Born in 1968, Tricky grew up in Knowle West in the 1970s and 1980s and was educated at Merrywood School. He named his 2008 album Knowle West Boy, in tribute to the area's influence on him and his music.

The England International rugby player Ellis Genge grew up on the estate.

== Amenities ==
=== Education ===
There are three primary schools in Knowle West; Greenfield Primary School, Oasis Academy Connaught, and the School of Christ the King. In addition there is Knowle DGE Special School (formerly the Florence Brown Community Special School), which serves pupils of all ages who have learning difficulties or social and emotional behaviour difficulties. There is also a nursery, Knowle West Children's Centre.· Secondary school students are educated in adjacent areas, following the closure of Merrywood School in 2000, after a critical report by Ofsted in 1997. The nearest secondary schools are Oasis Academy John Williams in Hengrove, St Bernadette Catholic Secondary School in Whitchurch, Bridge Learning Campus in Hartcliffe and Bedminster Down Secondary School. Ongoing adult education is provided at the Park Centre and nearby Bedminster and Marksbury Road libraries.

=== Health ===
There is a National Health Service walk-in centre for treating minor injuries on the Knowle West Health Park site. Doctors may be consulted at the adjacent GP walk-in centre and there are general practitioner (GP) led health centres nearby in Knowle, Bedminster and Hartcliffe. Dentistry is provided at practices in Bishopsworth, Knowle and Bedminster. The nearest hospital is Bristol Royal Infirmary in Bristol city centre. South Bristol Community Hospital in nearby Hengrove opened in March 2012.

== Community activities ==
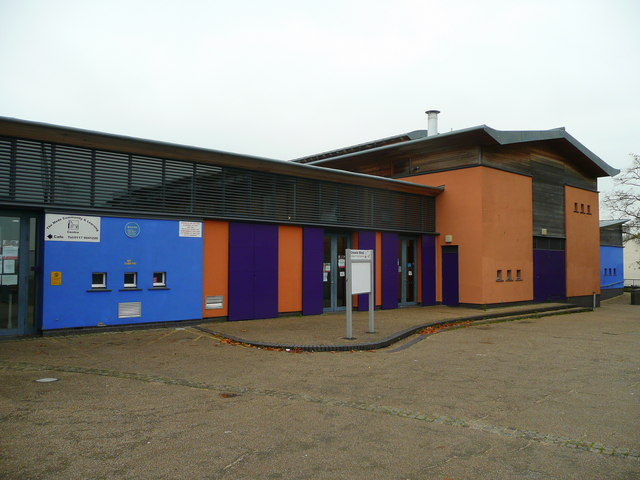
The Mede Community and Learning Centre

There are a number of community activities, including a community website, knowlewest.co.uk, showing the latest events and news in the area. A community newsletter called The Knowledge is produced by Community in Partnership (CIP), facilitated by the Knowle West Media Centre. The Knowle West Future planning forum was established in 2013 to work on a regeneration plan, based on the positive attributes of the estate.

The Knowle West Media Centre won a Queen's Award for Services in the Community in 2006 and the Knowle West Health Association won a Queen's Award for Voluntary Service in 2010.

Community enterprises include Re:work, who run construction, gardening, and furniture renovation projects, including their store on Filwood Broadway. They work with volunteers and support young people in skills development. Knowle West Health Park includes a GP service, a healthy living centre (which includes a studio with activities such as keep fit and dance activities), children's park, outdoor sports facilities, and a one-mile walk. Nearby nature walks include the Northern Slopes, including Novers Common, Glyn Vale/Kingswear and Wedmore Vale.

Local amenities include The Park Opportunity Centre, which offers a number of courses and programmes. The area has local shopping facilities, cafés and community centres and youth clubs such as Filwood Community Centre, Eagle House, Broadplain House, Novers Park, The Mede and KWMC (Knowle West Media Centre).

=== Churches ===
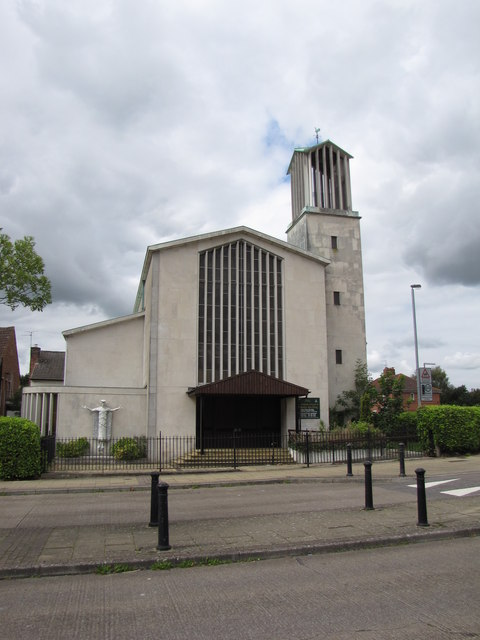
Christ the King Roman Catholic church, Filwood Broadway

Churches include Christ the King (Roman Catholic), built in 1952; Destiny Knowles Pentecostal Church (Pentecostal); St Barnabas (Church of England), built in 1938; Holy Cross (Church of God of Prophecy); and the Salvation Army.

== Transport ==
Knowle West is served by four council supported bus services, which connect the area to Totterdown, Broadmead, Hotwells, Bedminster and Brislington. In addition First West of England run two services, which connect with Withywood, the city centre and Hengrove. The nearest railway station is at Parson Street in Bedminster.

Journey times from Knowle West to the city centre have been identified as hampering employment opportunities for residents and proposals for a Greater Bristol Bus Network and a rapid transit scheme have noted the need to provide better connectivity for the area. A journey from Filwood Park to the city centre takes around 50 minutes and from Inns Court to Broadmead takes over 30 minutes. Proposed extensions to the A4174 ring road, which would pass along the southern part of Knowle West, have been claimed to reduce delays across the Greater Bristol area by 6%, and lead to a 9% increase in public transport use. The plans were approved by the Department for Transport in December 2011.

== Demographics ==
The population estimate for Filwood ward, as of 2008, was 11,787. There were 3,007 under 15 years old and 1,651 were of pensionable age. 7,316 were Christian, 2,925 had no religion and there were small numbers of Muslim, Buddhist, Hindu and Sikh residents. 96.2 per cent were described as white and 3.8 per cent as being of black minority ethnicity.

Even in 2011, the Filwood ward was still an area with a relatively small amount of ethnic minorities, with 85.8 per cent of the 12,267 residents being White British.

=== Employment ===
There are a number of small community enterprises in the area, but most of those in work need to drive to other parts of Bristol. The Bristol City Council Baseline Briefing notes that employment opportunities for those without a car are limited There is a retail park on the former Imperial Tobacco factory site in Hartcliffe, which has plans for further development. In addition, South Bristol Business Park was built on the former Filwood playing fields in the early 21st century. It was reported that 2,300 residents had local employment in 2008 and 3,264 were classed as economically inactive; that is to say they were not employed and not actively seeking employment. 71 per cent of jobs were in service industries. 213 residents were claiming unemployment benefits.

=== Deprivation ===
Six out of eight areas in Knowle West are ranked as being economically deprived. The closure of the Imperial Tobacco factory at nearby Hartcliffe in 1990 meant the loss of 5,000 jobs and an estimated further 20,000 jobs in service and supporting industries throughout South Bristol. A House of Commons report noted that this had a seriously negative effect on the area as many people in Knowle West and neighbouring areas lost the opportunity for "manual and semi-skilled employment". The Independent in 1995 noted high drug use and associated crime and reported on the establishment of Knowle West Against Drugs, led by local parents concerned about these problems. In 2006, BBC News said "Knowle West has more than its share of social problems. The highest number of kids in care of any council ward in Bristol. The lowest number of young people with any qualifications (under half). A major petty crime problem, drug addiction, and add to that people are fed up with bad housing." Shawnie, a 2006 novel by social worker Ed Trewavas, written from the point of view of a 13-year-old girl living in Knowle West, documents some of the deprivation he encountered in his work. One of the novel's characters "describes Knowle West ... as a 'shit hole' populated by 'yokels, cider-heads, junkies, dole-scammers, slappers and failed wide boys, all interbreeding and nicking their cruddy possessions off of each other in some giant, dismal rota.'"

The Guardian in 2007 reported "Fed up with the media's view of their community as a hub for drug use, crime and antisocial behaviour, the residents of one of Britain's most notorious housing estates decided to fight back." The article noted that projects such as Knowle West Media were having a positive impact, "Those kids coming out of the media centre aren't the criminals and layabouts everyone expects from Knowle West; they're film-makers, photographers and designers." According to police statistics the levels of crime and anti-social behaviour (ASB) in Knowle West are above average for England and Wales, with 241 crimes and ASB incidents reported in June 2011. A 2007 report for the Community Foundation Network, looking at the work of voluntary sector groups, found that three-quarters of the super output areas in Filwood ward are amongst the 10% most deprived in England. The report also found a strong sense of community within the area with "a history of community activity".

== Politics ==
Since 2015, the two Bristol City councillors for Filwood ward have been Labour Party members. The MP for the Bristol South constituency, since 2015, is Karin Smyth, of the Labour Party. Prior to that, the constituency was represented from 1987 by Dawn Primarolo, now the Right Honourable the Baroness Primarolo. Prior to Brexit in 2020, Filwood was represented in the European Parliament by the six MEPs of the South West England constituency.

== Environment ==
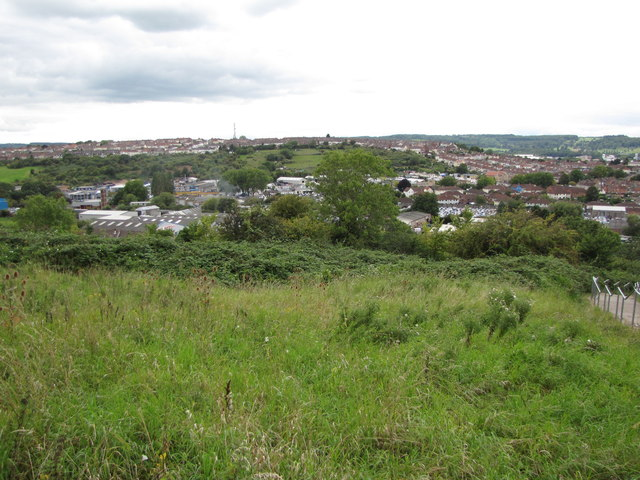
Novers Common, looking west towards Bedminster Down

Open spaces include Glyn Vale Open Space, part of the Northern Slopes; Filwood Playing Fields and Filwood Park; Airport Road Open Space; Inns Court Open Space, which all are proposed Sites of Nature Conservation Interest (SNCI), with areas of grassland, scrub and broad-leaved woodland. There are also three children's playgrounds and a few small open spaces, mostly grassed areas between buildings or at road junctions. There are 42 acres (17 ha) of natural open space and 69 acres (28 ha) of what is described by the city council as "informal open space", such as wide road verges, roundabouts and playing fields, in Knowle West. The average number of bird species per garden is two and 41 per cent of residents reported frogs in gardens or allotments. Proposals for development of open spaces were made in 2009 by Bristol City Council and opposed by residents. On the Northern Slopes, tree species recorded include hazel, blackthorn, alder, and hawthorn; bird life includes robins, blackbirds, chiffchaffs, house sparrows, starlings, and thrushes; wildflowers include cowslips, primroses, agrinomy, and knapweed; and mammals include rabbits and foxes as well as pipistrelle and noctule bats.

== See also ==
- Knowle Bristol

== Works cited ==
- "Filwood Ward Profile 2008" (PDF). Bristol City Council. Archived from the original (PDF) on 20 January 2012.
- "Baseline Briefing: Part 1" (PDF). Knowle West Regeneration Framework. Bristol City Council. 2009. Archived from the original (PDF) on 13 January 2012.
- "Baseline Briefing: Part 2" (PDF). Knowle West Regeneration Framework. Bristol City Council. 2009. Archived from the original (PDF) on 29 September 2012.
- Longman, Timothy (2008). "Filwood Park Playing Fields, Creswicke Road, Filwood, Bristol" (MS Word). BaRAS Report No. 2064/2008. Bristol and Region Archaeological Services.
