= Brislington West =

Council ward in Bristol, England

Coordinates: 51.4316°N 2.5536°W

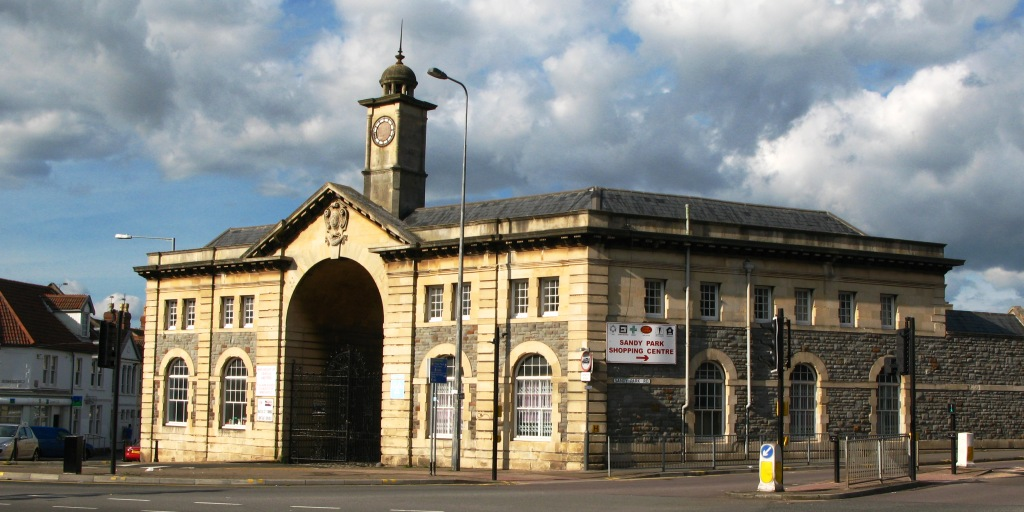
- Old tram depot, Bath Road/Sandy Park Road

- Location within Bristol
- Population: 11,355
- OS grid reference: ST622704
- Unitary authority: Bristol
- Region: South West
- Country: England
- Sovereign state: United Kingdom
- Post town: BRISTOL
- Postcode district: BS4
- Dialling code: 0117
- Police: Avon and Somerset
- Fire: Avon
- Ambulance: South Western
- UK Parliament: Bristol East

Brislington West is a council ward of the city of Bristol, England. It covers the western part of Brislington, together with Arnos Vale and Kensington Park.

== Brislington ==
Brislington is one of the largest suburbs of Bristol, southeast of the city centre. It is split into two sections for the purposes of local government; Brislington West and Brislington East. Notable places in the western section include Oasis Academy Brislington, the ITV West Country studios and part of Arnos Vale Cemetery.

== Arno's Vale ==
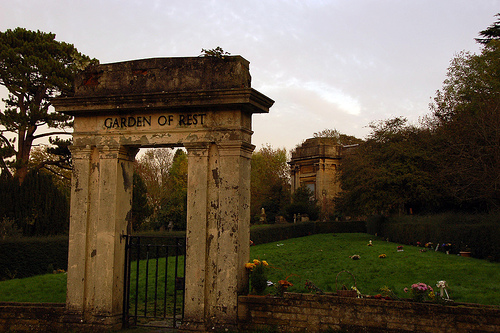
Part of the cemetery

Arno's Vale (also written Arnos Vale) is an area centred just over two miles from the city's centre point. It includes the 1837-begun, wooded Arno's Vale Cemetery, which occupies 45 acres (18 ha). Its grounds are statutorily listed (protected) in the mid-category, II*. Burials ceased in 1998, but it has been kept open by volunteers since. It is part of the old Arno's Court Estate, one of four in Bristol where a single proprietor's manor house or grand country estate house has survived. Its current use is as a hotel (Arno's Manor Hotel). The remaining estate land includes Arno's Court Park. The park, which has views across Bristol, forms the peak of a crest between Knowle and Brislington in the city.

The parkland core of Arno's estate, which includes the Parkside Hotel, Arno's Court Triumphal Arch and Black Castle Public House is beside the A4 road, 2 miles (3.2 km) southeast of Bristol city centre. Roads to Bath and Wells run through the area. The estate has namesakes, derived from its Georgian owners, in two parts of the former British West Indies: St Vincent and Trinidad.

== Kensington Park ==
Kensington Park is a small suburb. It is centred on the stretch of Bath Road which runs from Arno's Vale to Brislington village, and includes Kensington Park Road, Kings and Hampstead Roads, the southern end of Winchester and Wick Roads, Eagle Road and the northern parts of Water Lane. In the west it is bounded by Upper Knowle and to the north, east and south by Brislington.

In terms of both its architectural style and demographics, it is similar to other areas of south Bristol such as Southville and Upper Knowle, although considerably smaller than either. Houses in the district are largely Victorian and early 20th century dwellings, and include many which are large and well-preserved. It is largely inhabited by urban professionals.

On Bath Road, opposite the entrance to Kensington Park Road, is a small memorial cross dedicated to people who lost their lives in the First World War.

== Notable residents ==
- Anna Russell (1807 – 1876), botanist, was born in Arno's Vale, and lived in Brislington.
