= Withywood =

Area of Bristol, England

Coordinates: 51.4049°N 2.6123°W

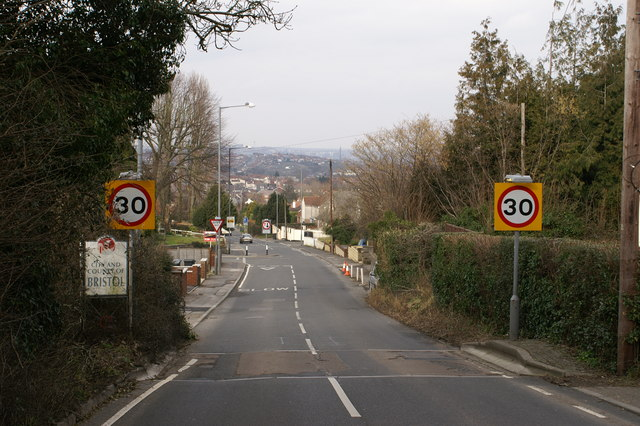
- City limits at Withywood

- Location within Bristol
- OS grid reference: ST575675
- Unitary authority: Bristol
- Ceremonial county: Bristol
- Region: South West
- Country: England
- Sovereign state: United Kingdom
- Post town: BRISTOL
- Postcode district: BS13
- Dialling code: 0117
- Police: Avon and Somerset
- Fire: Avon
- Ambulance: South Western
- UK Parliament: Bristol South

Withywood is a suburban neighbourhood of Bristol, England. It is situated on the southern border of the city, between Hartcliffe and Bishopsworth, just north of Dundry Hill. It is a large estate, begun in the 1950s.

Withywood has a number of primary schools: Fair Furlong, Four Acres, Gay Elms and Merchants Academy. There is a secondary school, Merchants Academy, which opened in November 2008, before the demolition of the former Withywood Community School. All of the schools have sports fields and grounds. They have also been a registered charity since 1996.

Queen's Road has a number of shops and the Amelia Nutt Health Clinic at the Withywood Centre. Four Acres road also has shops directly opposite Sherrin Way bus terminus (the end of the journey) next to 'The Rusham' retirement homes. It has a pub, from Elm Tree.

Between Sherrin Way and The Coppice, runs the River Malago. This disappears into a culvert where the stream meets Four Acres.

A big regeneration program is taking place around the area, new apartments on Hengrove Way and further development of The Junction shopping complex, and a proposal of a swimming pool and leisure complex alongside Cineworld, all within walking distance of Withywood. The Dundry View Neighbourhood Partnership works with residents in Bedminster Down, Bishopsworth, Hartcliffe, Headley Park, Highridge, Teyfant, Uplands, Whitchurch Park and Withywood.

For elections to Bristol City Council, the area is part of Hartcliffe and Withywood electoral ward.
