= The Eagles (British band) =

British rock band

- Origin: Bristol, England
- Genres: Rock
- Years active: 1958–1964
- Labels: Pye Records, Vogue Schallplatten
- Past members: Terry Clarke; Rod Meacham; Michael Brice; Johnny Payne

The Eagles were a British music quartet active from 1958 until the mid-1960s. They formed in 1958 at the Eagle House youth club in Knowle West, Bristol.

Led by lead guitarist Terry Clarke (11 June 1944, Bristol – 29 October 2008), who used a homebuilt custom instrument, the group included drummer Rod Meacham (born Roderick Meacham, 25 March 1943, Bristol, died 21 March 2002, Bristol), bassist Michael Brice (born 4 March 1944, Bristol), and Johnny Payne on rhythm guitar (born John Payne, 1944). Playing primarily instrumental rock, they began their career playing local venues in Bristol such as dance halls.

They were launched into the world of professional music in 1962 after being noticed by composer Ron Grainer, probably best remembered for his theme to Doctor Who. Grainer was interested in the Eagles for a film project on which he was working, Some People, about a fictional Bristol band not unlike themselves. The Eagles contributed to the Some People soundtrack, and became Grainer's protégés, recording new versions of some of his film score work, such as the theme of the television series Maigret. The Some People soundtrack reached No. 2 on the EP charts, and remained on the charts for 21 weeks.

The group were awarded the Duke of Edinburgh Trophy for their work on the film, and soon afterward were signed to Pye Records, at the time among the top three labels in Britain. After releasing the singles "Bristol Express" and "Exodus (Main Theme)", the Eagles embarked on a major tour of England along with Del Shannon, Stevie Wonder, Johnny Tillotson, and Dionne Warwick.

The tour lasted much of 1963, during which their debut album, Smash Hits From The Eagles, was released in the UK and the US. The following year brought their most successful single and the one for which they are best remembered today, a vocal rendition of "Wishin' and Hopin'", with the B-side "Write Me a Letter".

== After the Eagles ==
Clarke continued to play with local bands until the 1980s, and then played as a duet with his wife (building his wife's bass guitar) in Bristol until his death in 2008. Payne returned to Bristol and also continued to play with local bands. Brice continues his music career playing with the band 'The Ivy League'. The Eagles' music is available on many compilation albums of the era, and in 1998 Sanctuary Records released a 61-track double album set, Smash Hits from The Eagles and The Kestrels.
