= St Peter's Church, Bishopsworth =

Church in Bristol, England

St Peter's Church
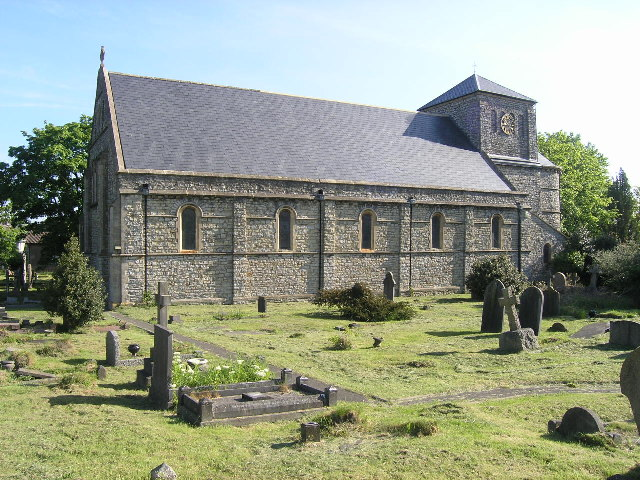

- Location within Bristol

General information
- Architectural style: Neo-Norman
- Location: Bristol, England
- Coordinates: 51.4148°N 2.6197°W
- Construction started: 1194
- Completed: 1843

Design and construction
- Architect: Samuel Charles Fripp

St Peter's (grid reference ST570686) is a Neo Norman style church in Bishopsworth, Bristol, England.

== History ==
The first church in Bishopsworth was a small chapel dedicated to St Peter and St Paul built under an arrangement in 1194 between Robert Arthur, lord of the manor, and George de Dunster, prebendary of Bedminster. The agreement provided for a chaplain to visit from Bedminster on Wednesdays, Fridays and Sundays. This provision continued until dissolution in 1540. The chapel was converted into three cottages which stood until the Corporation demolished them in 1961 to make way for a swimming pool.

The present church, dedicated to St Peter, was built in 1841–43. The neo-Norman design was the work of Samuel Charles Fripp. Construction started on the current church in 1841 and was not completed until 1842 or 1843. The church's planned tower was never completed on time. It became a parish church in 1853. It is little altered except for a vestry / porch which was added in 1877.

It has been designated by English Heritage as a grade II* listed building.

The churchyard contains war graves of four soldiers, from the airman and Royal Navy and a sailor of World War II.

== See also ==
- Churches in Bristol
- Grade II* listed buildings in Bristol
