= Dixie Brown =

Boxer from Saint Lucia (1900–1957)

- Dixie Brown, c. 1930
- Born: Anthony George Charles; 27 June 1900; Castries, Saint Lucia
- Died: 20 April 1957 (aged 56); Bristol, England, UK
- Occupation: Boxer

Anthony George Charles (born 27 June 1900 in Castries, Saint Lucia; died 20 April 1957) was a boxer, commonly known as Dixie Brown.

He worked on the construction of the Panama Canal and emigrated to Cardiff, Wales in 1919. In the West Country of England, he survived by working as a bare-knuckle boxer in fairground booths. He moved with his wife, Lily Sellick, to Bristol in 1923, and registered as a professional boxer, fighting 85 bouts in the 1920s and 1930s, as welterweight and middleweight. He trained at the White Horse in Milk Street. He could not contest any British championships owing to the colour bar then in operation. He had two wins, both over one-time champion Billy Green, five losses and two draws in his professional career.

Brown started family life in the "tough neighbourhood" of Philadelphia Street, St Jude's. He was blinded in a fight in the 1930s and then moved with his family to Knowle West, Bristol after the Blitz. A collection was made to send him to the Catholic shrine of Lourdes in France, in search of a cure. He was visited by many African American soldiers during the Second World War, as they respected him as "a well known and a much admired character".

Brown had nine children and thirty grandchildren. One of his grandsons used to take him to his local public house, the Venture Inn, where he had his own special chair. He was popular and well respected throughout Bristol. Brown died in 1957 and is buried in Holy Souls Catholic Cemetery next door to Arnos Vale Cemetery in Bristol. Bristol historian Madge Dresser described him as "a family man who founded a virtual dynasty of Bristolians of mixed heritage, all of whom remember him with fondness."
