= Hewett Watson =

English botanist (1804–1881)

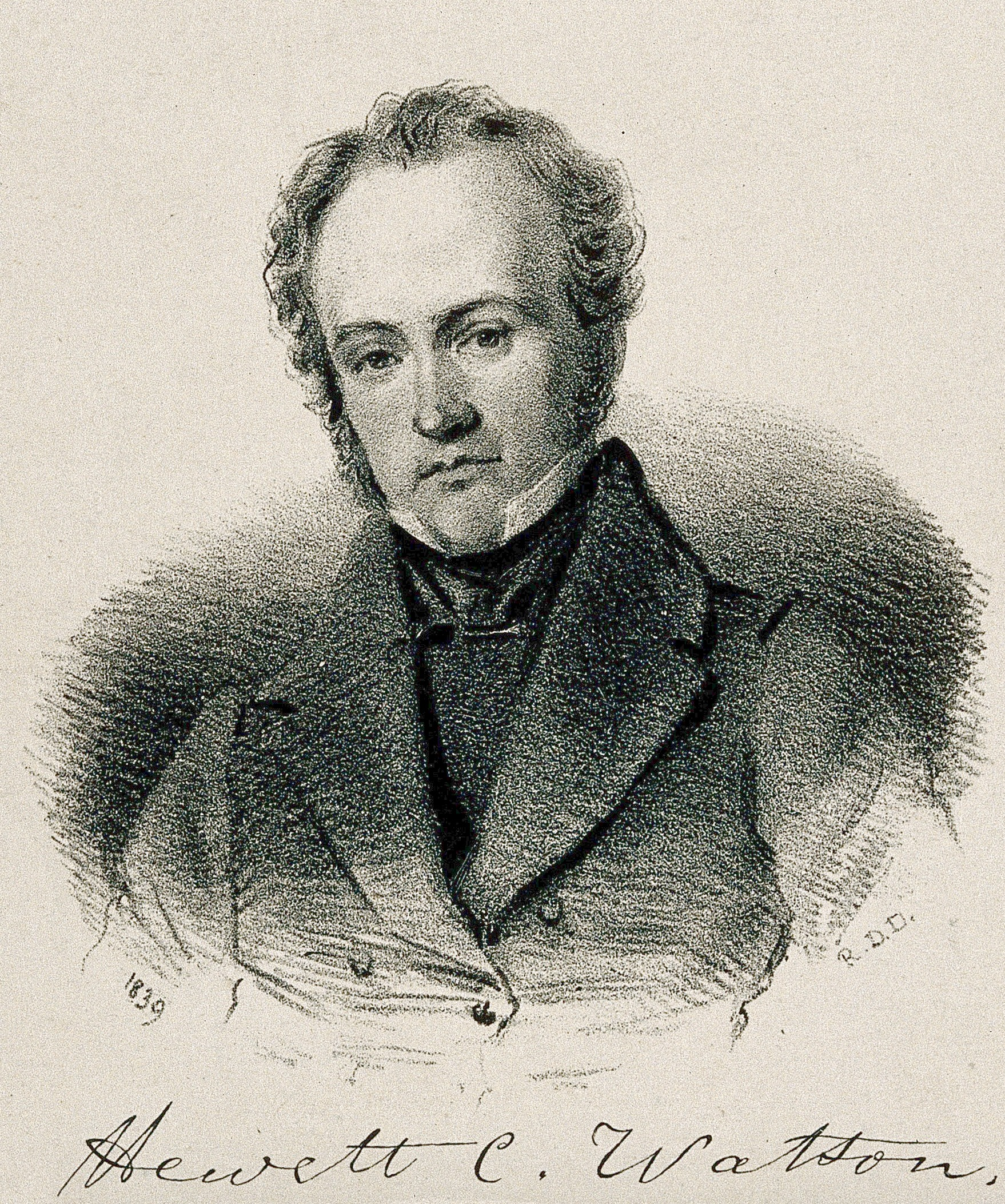
Hewett Cottrell Watson c. 1839

Hewett Cottrell Watson (9 May 1804 – 27 July 1881) was a phrenologist, botanist and evolutionary theorist. He was born in Firbeck, near Rotherham, Yorkshire, and died at Thames Ditton, Surrey.

== Biography ==
Watson was the eldest son of Holland Watson, a Justice of the Peace and Mayor of Congleton in Cheshire, and his wife, Harriet Powell. His mother died when he was fifteen. He had seven older sisters and two younger brothers and his early life was overshadowed by a terrible relationship with his father, a reactionary conservative whose character Watson himself detailed in later years. Watson attended Dinnington High School, then a dame school, until his early teens. As a teenager, Watson suffered a serious injury to his knee in a cricket match, and never recovered full movement in the joint again. Watson's mother had attempted to distract him from family tensions by sending him to work with the family's gardener, and it was after her death that his obsession with botany began. While training for the legal profession in Liverpool, Watson became interested in phrenology and decided to study medicine and natural history at Edinburgh University (from 1828 to 1832). He was elected a Senior President of the Royal Medical Society as an undergraduate, but left without taking a degree because of a breakdown in his health. In Edinburgh, he became friendly with the botanist Robert Graham, who encouraged his interest in biogeography, and with the phrenologist George Combe, joining the Edinburgh Phrenological Society in 1829. Soon afterwards, Watson inherited an estate in Derbyshire. In 1833, he moved to Thames Ditton. He travelled to the Azores in 1842, spending three months collecting botanical specimens from four of the larger islands, while serving at his own expense as ship's botanist for the Styx under the command of Captain Vidal.

Watson edited the Phrenological Journal from 1837 to 1840 and the London Catalogue of British Plants with George Edgar Dennes from 1844 to 1874.

Watson was noted for his intellectual brilliance and for his often difficult and cantankerous personality. He led an isolated and restricted life, never married and travelled only once outside Britain. He applied unsuccessfully – or withdrew his applications – for senior academic positions in London and Dublin and for a senior post at Kew – yet he was a widely acknowledged authority on botanical science and on the distribution of botanical species in the British Isles. Despite his social isolation, Watson showed a remarkable command of the scientific questions of the day, including the importance of statistical methods in scientific enquiry, the asymmetric lateralization of brain function and the transmutation of species (evolutionary theory). In 1836, he published a paper in the Phrenological Journal entitled What is the Use of the Double Brain ? in which he speculated about the differential development of the two human cerebral hemispheres. This was eight years before Arthur Ladbroke Wigan published his influential The Duality of Mind (1844). Watson was unusual among the phrenologists in explicitly disavowing phrenology in later life.

In subsequent years, Watson was heavily influenced by the ideas of the evolutionary phrenologist Robert Chambers, and collected evidence for – and defended – the concept of species transmutation. He corresponded with Charles Darwin who lived at Downe, some 30 miles from Thames Ditton, and Darwin drew heavily on Watson's unique appreciation of the distribution of British plant species. In 1856, Watson actually declined a personal invitation to discuss evolutionary theory with Darwin and Joseph Hooker, because he was too busy and did not wish to travel. Nevertheless, in On the Origin of Species, Charles Darwin made generous acknowledgement of Watson as a vitally important source of scientific information and, in turn, on the publication of On the Origin of Species, Watson was one of the first to write to Darwin – on 21 November 1859 – congratulating him on his extraordinary achievement.

The system of Watsonian vice-counties is still used by botanists. It is one of his contributions to botanical science.

== Legacy ==
Eleocharis watsonii Bab. ('Slender Spike-rush'-- now known as Eleocharis uniglumis Schultes) was named after him.

The plant genus Hewittia Wight & Arn. (1837) (Convolvulaceae) is dedicated to him.

The journal Watsonia was named after him.

His manuscripts are housed at the Natural History Museum and also at Kew.

== Publications ==
His many published contributions include several county floras and the following:

- 1832: Outlines of Distribution of British Plants
- 1835–1837: New Botany Guide
- 1847–1859: Cybele Britannica 4 vols.
- 1860, 1872: Supplements to the Cybele Britannica. 2 parts
- 1870: A Compendium of the Cybele Britannica
- 1870: the botany section in Frederick DuCane Godman's Natural History of the Azores
- 1873–1874 Topographical Botany 2 vols. Contents: pt 1st. Ranunculaceae-coniferae – pt. 2nd. Orchidaceae-equisetaceae; Bibliography: pp. 571–575. The 2nd ed. 1883 includes John G. Baker's memoir of Watson; two supplements issued in 1905 and 1929

As editor

- The Phrenological Journal from 1837 to 1840
- The London Catalogue of British Plants from 1844 to 1874

== See also ==
- Anna Russell (1807 – 1876), botanist, contributor to his New Botany Guide
