= Anna Russell (botanist) =

English botanist (1807–1876)

A.W. Russell
- Born: November 1807; Arno's Vale, Bristol
- Died: 11 November 1876 (aged 68–69); Kenilworth
- Known for: "ablest and most outstanding woman field botanist of her time"
- Spouse: Frederick Russell
- Scientific career
- Fields: Botany
- Author abbrev. (botany): A.W.Russell

Anna Worsley Russell (November 1807 – 11 November 1876) was a British botanist. She has been described as "perhaps the ablest and most outstanding woman field botanist of her time".

== Biography ==
Anna Worsley was born in November 1807 in Arnos Vale, Bristol, one of at least seven children born to Philip John Worsley, who was a sugar refiner. Her family were Unitarians and several of them had scientific interests; as a child they encouraged her in her interest in natural history. At first she studied entomology (the study of insects), but later she turned to plants. Anna's brother-in-law, Thomas Butler, who would later be the rector of a parish near Nottingham and the father of the novelist Samuel Butler, himself had a strong interest in botany and may have influenced Anna to pursue it as well.

In 1835, the first volume of H. C. Watson's New Botanist's Guide was published, containing substantial contributions from Worsley, namely a list of flowering plants in the Bristol area. This brought greater attention to her work and in 1839 she published her Catalogue of Plants, found in the Neighbourhood of Newbury, which ran to thirty-one pages and included the first records in Berkshire of over sixty species. She soon joined the Botanical Society of London and actively contributed to its specimen exchanges. She also developed an interest in moss and fungi.

Worsley married Frederick Russell in 1844. Russell was also a Unitarian and a botanist. They had been friends for several years, with Russell accompanying Worsley on plant gathering expeditions and collecting some specimens for her. At first they lived in Brislington, near Bristol, but in 1856 they moved to Kenilworth, Warwickshire. She studied the fungi in the local area, publishing a paper in the Journal of Botany on rare local species and preparing more than seven hundred and thirty drawings.

Anna Russell died in Kenilworth on 11 November 1876. Her husband had died before her and she had no children. She left her drawings to the British Museum (Natural History), where they are still kept, and her herbarium and collection of birds' eggs to the Birmingham and Midland Institute.

The standard author abbreviation A.W.Russell is used to indicate this person as the author when citing a botanical name.

== Bibliography ==
- Catalogue of Plants, Found in the Neighbourhood of Newbury, Mrs Anna Worsley Russell, Palala Press, 50p, 2015, ISBN 1342413989
