= BS postcode area =

Postcode area within the United Kingdom

Bristol
- Postcode area
- Location within the United Kingdom
- Coordinates: 51.445°N 2.632°W
- Sovereign state: United Kingdom
- Postcode area: BS
- Postcode area name: Bristol
- Post towns: 8
- Postcode districts: 47
- Postcode sectors: 205
- Postcodes (live): 26,740
- Postcodes (total): 45,317
- Statistics as at May 2020

The BS postcode area, also known as the Bristol postcode area, is a group of 37 postcode districts in South West England, within eight post towns. These cover the city of Bristol, north Somerset (including Weston-super-Mare, Axbridge, Banwell, Cheddar, Clevedon, Wedmore, Portishead and Winscombe) and south Gloucestershire.

== Coverage ==
The approximate coverage of the postcode districts:

Postcode district	Post town	Coverage	Local authority area(s)
BS0	BRISTOL		non-geographic
BS1	BRISTOL	Bristol city centre, Redcliffe	Bristol
BS2	BRISTOL	Kingsdown, St Paul's, St Phillips, St Agnes	Bristol
BS3	BRISTOL	Bedminster, Southville, Bower Ashton, part of Totterdown, Windmill Hill	Bristol
BS4	BRISTOL	Brislington, Knowle, Knowle West, St Anne's, part of Totterdown	Bristol
BS5	BRISTOL	Easton, St George, Redfield, Whitehall, Eastville, Speedwell, Greenbank, Barton Hill	Bristol
BS6	BRISTOL	Cotham, Redland, Montpelier, Westbury Park, St. Andrew's	Bristol
BS7	BRISTOL	Bishopston, Horfield, part of Filton, Lockleaze, Ashley Down	Bristol, South Gloucestershire
BS8	BRISTOL	Clifton, Failand, Hotwells, Leigh Woods	Bristol, North Somerset
BS9	BRISTOL	Coombe Dingle, Sneyd Park, Stoke Bishop, Westbury on Trym, Henleaze, Sea Mills	Bristol
BS10	BRISTOL	Brentry, Henbury, Southmead, part of Westbury on Trym	Bristol
BS11	BRISTOL	Avonmouth, Shirehampton, Lawrence Weston	Bristol
BS13	BRISTOL	Bedminster Down, Bishopsworth, Hartcliffe, Withywood, Headley Park	Bristol
BS14	BRISTOL	Hengrove, Stockwood, Whitchurch,	Bristol, Bath and North East Somerset
BS15	BRISTOL	Hanham, Kingswood	Bristol, South Gloucestershire
BS16	BRISTOL	Downend, Emersons Green, Fishponds, Frenchay, Pucklechurch, Mangotsfield, Staple Hill	Bristol, South Gloucestershire
BS20	BRISTOL	Pill, Portishead	North Somerset
BS21	CLEVEDON	Clevedon	North Somerset
BS22	WESTON-SUPER-MARE	Kewstoke, Weston-super-Mare, Worle	North Somerset
BS23	WESTON-SUPER-MARE	Uphill, Weston-super-Mare	North Somerset
BS24	WESTON-SUPER-MARE	Bleadon, Hutton, Locking, Lympsham, Puxton, Weston-super-Mare, Wick St. Lawrence	North Somerset, Somerset
BS25	WINSCOMBE	Churchill, Winscombe, Sandford, Shipham	North Somerset, Somerset
BS26	AXBRIDGE	Axbridge, Compton Bishop, Loxton	Somerset, North Somerset
BS27	CHEDDAR	Cheddar, Draycott	Somerset
BS28	WEDMORE	Wedmore	Somerset
BS29	BANWELL	Banwell	North Somerset
BS30	BRISTOL	Bitton, Longwell Green, Cadbury Heath, Oldland Common, Warmley, Wick	South Gloucestershire
BS31	BRISTOL	Keynsham, Saltford	Bath and North East Somerset
BS32	BRISTOL	Sector 4: Almondsbury, Aztec West; Sectors 8, 9 and 0: Bradley Stoke	South Gloucestershire
BS34	BRISTOL	Sector 5: Patchway, Charlton Hayes, Cribbs Causeway; Sector 6: Little Stoke; Sector 7: Filton (Except Northville); Sector 8: Stoke Gifford	South Gloucestershire
BS35	BRISTOL	Sector 1: Oldbury on Severn, Thornbury North; Sector 2: Thornbury South; Sector 3: Alveston, Rudgeway; Sector 4: Aust, Olveston, Pilning, Severn Beach; Sector 5: Easter Compton	South Gloucestershire
BS36	BRISTOL	Sector 1: Winterbourne; Sector 2: Frampton Cotterell, Coalpit Heath	South Gloucestershire
BS37	BRISTOL	Sector 4: Yate Centre and South; Sector 5: Yate NW, Nibley; Sector 6: Chipping Sodbury; Sector 7: Ladden Garden Common, Rangeworthy; Sector 8: Westerleigh, Wapley, Far South of Yate	South Gloucestershire
BS39	BRISTOL	Paulton, Clutton, Temple Cloud, High Littleton, Pensford, Bishop Sutton	Bath and North East Somerset
BS40	BRISTOL	Chew Valley, Chew Magna, Chew Stoke, Blagdon, Wrington, Charterhouse	Bath and North East Somerset, North Somerset, Somerset
BS41	BRISTOL	Long Ashton, Dundry	North Somerset
BS48	BRISTOL	Backwell, Nailsea	North Somerset
BS49	BRISTOL	Congresbury, Yatton	North Somerset
BS98	BRISTOL		non-geographic
BS99	BRISTOL		non-geographic

== Historic codes ==
Until about 1994 different numbers applied to districts from BS12 upwards.

No longer existing are: BS12, BS17, BS18 and BS19; these were as follows:

BS12 covered: Almondsbury, Alveston, Aust, Awkley, Bradley Stoke, Earthcote Green, Easter Compton, Elberton, Filton, Ingst, Itchington, Littleton-on-Severn, Morton, Northwick, Oldbury Naite, Oldbury-on-Severn, Olveston, Over, Patchway, Pilning, Redwick, Rudgeway, Severn Beach, Shepperdine, Stoke Gifford, Thornbury, and Tockington

BS17 covered: Chipping Sodbury, Mangotsfield, Old Sodbury, Pucklechurch, Rangeworthy, Winterbourne, and Yate

BS18 covered: Compton Dando, High Littleton, Saltford, Long Ashton, West Harptree, Wrington, Paulton, Chew Magna, Blagdon, Temple Cloud, and Keynsham.

BS19 covered: Backwell, Churchill, Congresbury, Flax Bourton, Nailsea and Yatton.

The above codes are correct, but not complete. Other towns and villages may have shared these postcodes.

== Map ==
BS postcode area map, showing postcode districts in red and post towns in grey text, with links to nearby BA, GL, NP, SN and TA postcode areas.

Detailed map of postcode districts in central Bristol

== See also ==
- List of postcode areas in the United Kingdom
- Postcode Address File
