= George Edgar Dennes =

English solicitor and botanist

- Born: 27 March 1817; Soham, Cambridgeshire, England
- Died: 27 March 1871 (aged 54); Melbourne, Victoria, Australia
- Scientific career
- Fields: Botany

George Edgar Dennes (1817 – 27 March 1871) was an English solicitor, politician, and plant collector.

== Biography ==
George Edgar Dennes, the son of George and Ann Dennes, was baptised in Soham, Cambridgeshire, on 27 March 1817, although at least one other source suggests that he was born in Australia.

Dennes was by profession a solicitor with a passion for botany, with his plant collections from England today held in British museums. Embroiled in intrigue around the financial mismanagement of the Botanical Society of London, a precursor to the Botanical Society of Britain and Ireland, Dennes travelled to the Vancouver Island Colony of western Canada in 1860.

During this period, Dennes continued to practice law and sat as a member of the House of Assembly for the Colony of Vancouver Island. He represented the constituency of Saltspring Island and Chemainus from 13 October 1863 to 20 April 1866. He continued to have difficulties with money and was the colony's first solicitor to be struck off, for multiple contempts due to bankruptcy in 1866. He returned to London soon after, before again embarking a ship in early 1867 to the Colony of Victoria. He arrived in Melbourne in June 1867 and was registered as a solicitor in the following year, advertising as a "Solicitor for the Insolvent" in the local papers. In January 1871 he was admitted to the Yarra Bend Asylum and died, aged 53, in March that year from "disease of the brain and lungs."

== Standard author abbreviation ==
The standard author abbreviation Dennes is used to indicate this person as the author when citing a botanical name.

== Legacy ==
The extinct vascular plant extinct plant Vicia dennesiana H.C. Watson was named in his honour. According to a recollection of a conversation with Watson, over 40 years after his death, it was claimed that Watson had not named after Dennes in recognition of his service to the Society as honorary secretary from 1837 until the club folded in November 1856. Instead, Britten claimed that the sudden disappearance of the plant mirrored Dennes' sudden disappearance from England after the collapse of the Society in 1856. His sudden departure from London and not being seen again is what allegedly inspired Watson to name the plant after him.

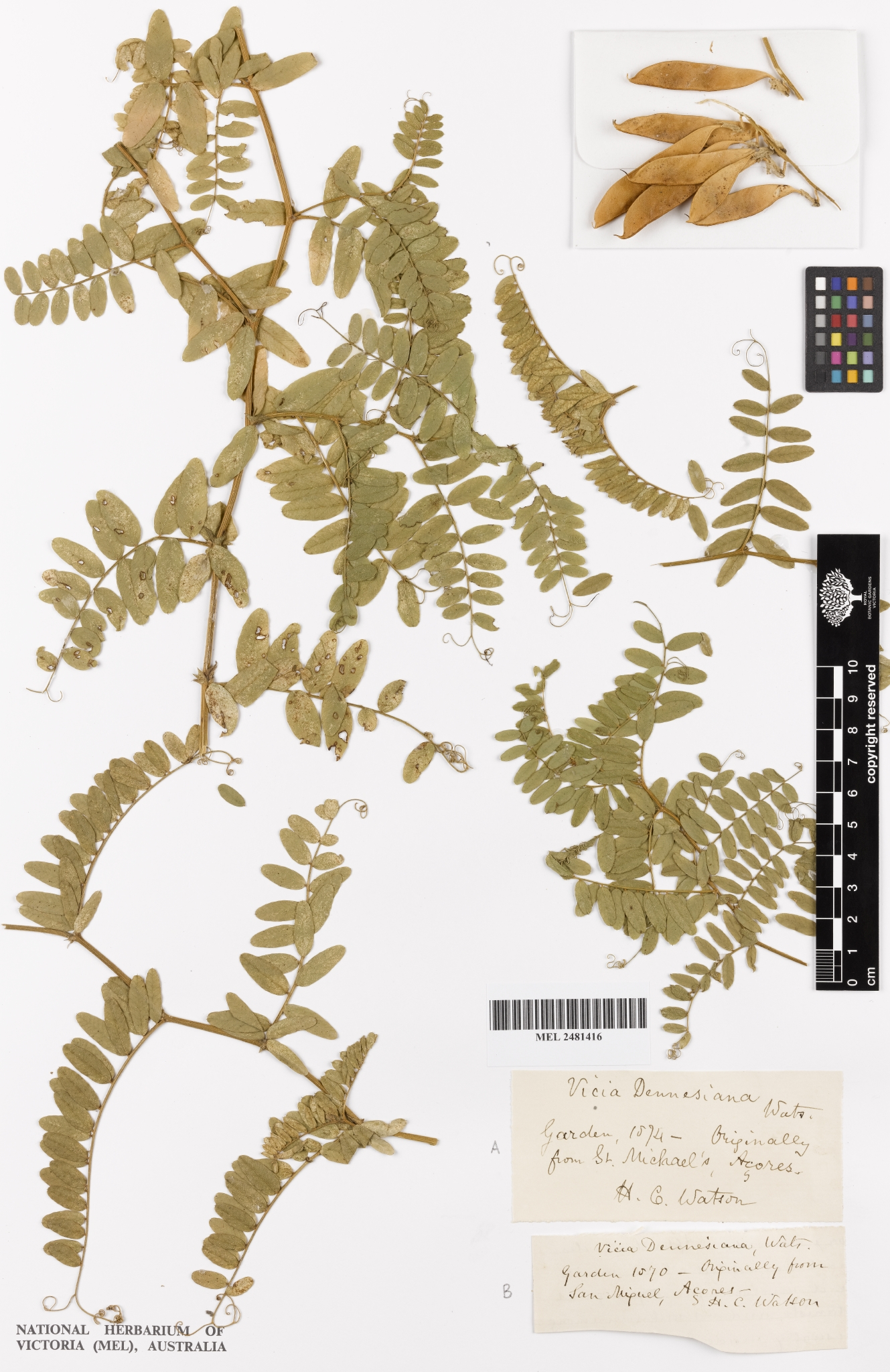
Two specimens of Vicia dennesiana H.C.Watson (MEL 2481416A and MEL 2481416B), cultivated by H.C. Watson in the 19th century.
