= Bedminster Down =

Suburb of Bristol, England

Coordinates: 51.4258°N 2.6118°W

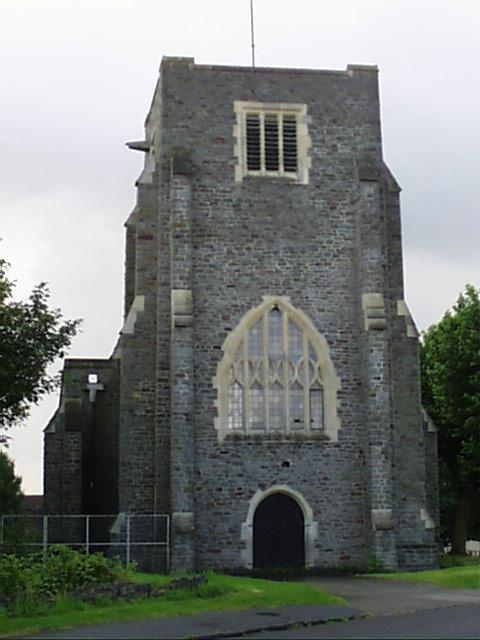
- St Oswald's Church

- Location within Bristol
- OS grid reference: ST575698
- Unitary authority: Bristol
- Region: South West
- Country: England
- Sovereign state: United Kingdom
- Post town: BRISTOL
- Postcode district: BS13
- Dialling code: 0117
- Police: Avon and Somerset
- Fire: Avon
- Ambulance: South Western
- UK Parliament: Bristol South

Bedminster Down is a suburban neighbourhood of Bristol, England, built largely in the 1930s. It extends from Bedminster to Ashton, Bishopsworth, Highridge and Uplands, and is a largely residential area. Bedminster Down is a middle-class area and some of the area is built over disused coal mines.

The Parish Church, built in 1927, is dedicated to St Oswald. The Methodist church in the area shut down in August 2008. The Methodist church consisted of two buildings, the main chapel and a church hall. The main chapel is currently in use as a community arts centre.
