= Brislington East =

Coordinates: 51.4316°N 2.5439°W

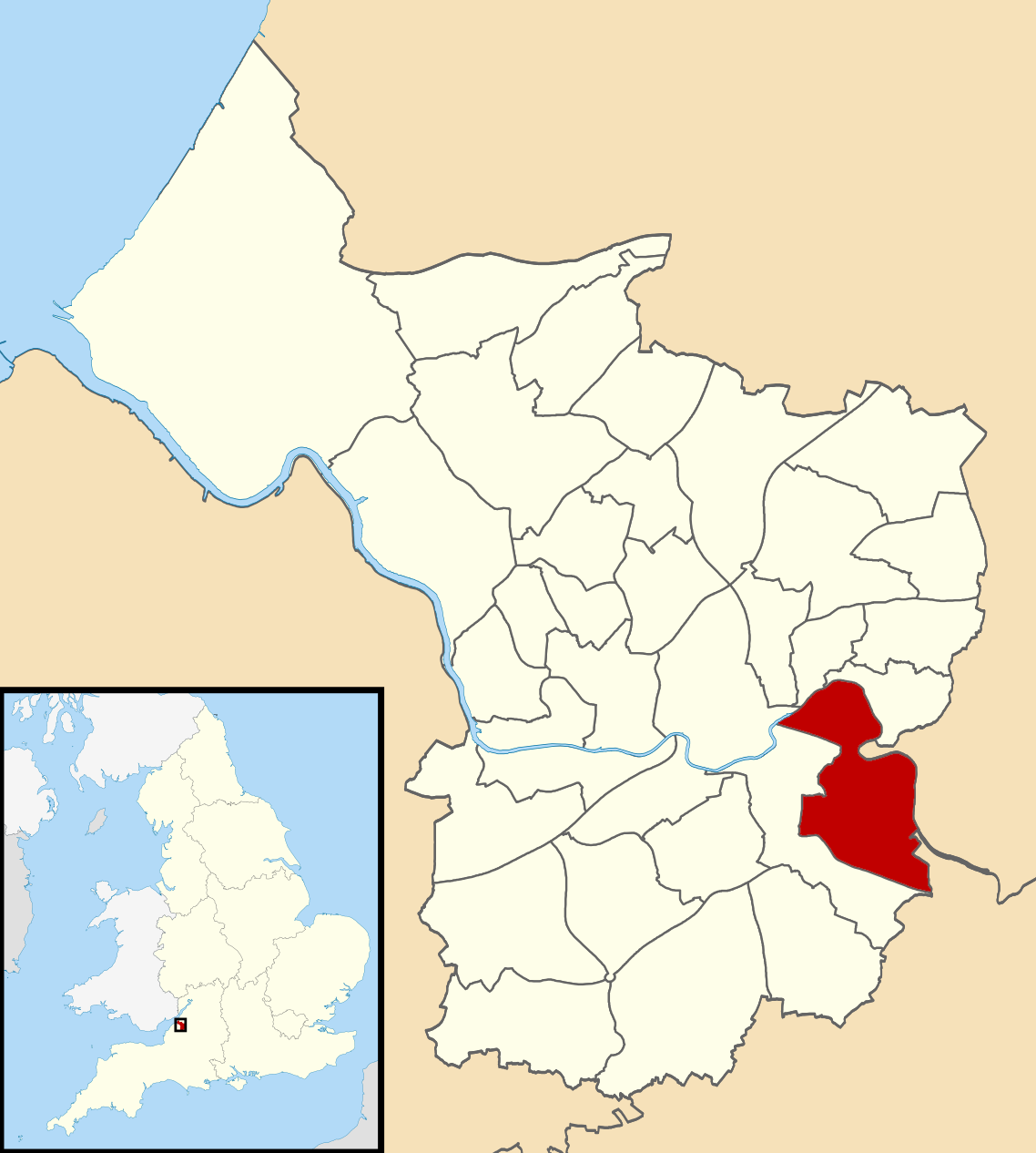
- Ward boundaries since 2016
- Population: 11,584
- OS grid reference: ST622704
- Unitary authority: Bristol
- Region: South West
- Country: England
- Sovereign state: United Kingdom
- Post town: BRISTOL
- Postcode district: BS4
- Dialling code: 0117
- Police: Avon and Somerset
- Fire: Avon
- Ambulance: South Western
- UK Parliament: Bristol East

Brislington East is a council ward of the city of Bristol, England. The ward covers the eastern part of Brislington and the areas of Bristol known as Broom Hill, St Anne's and St Anne's Park.

== Brislington ==
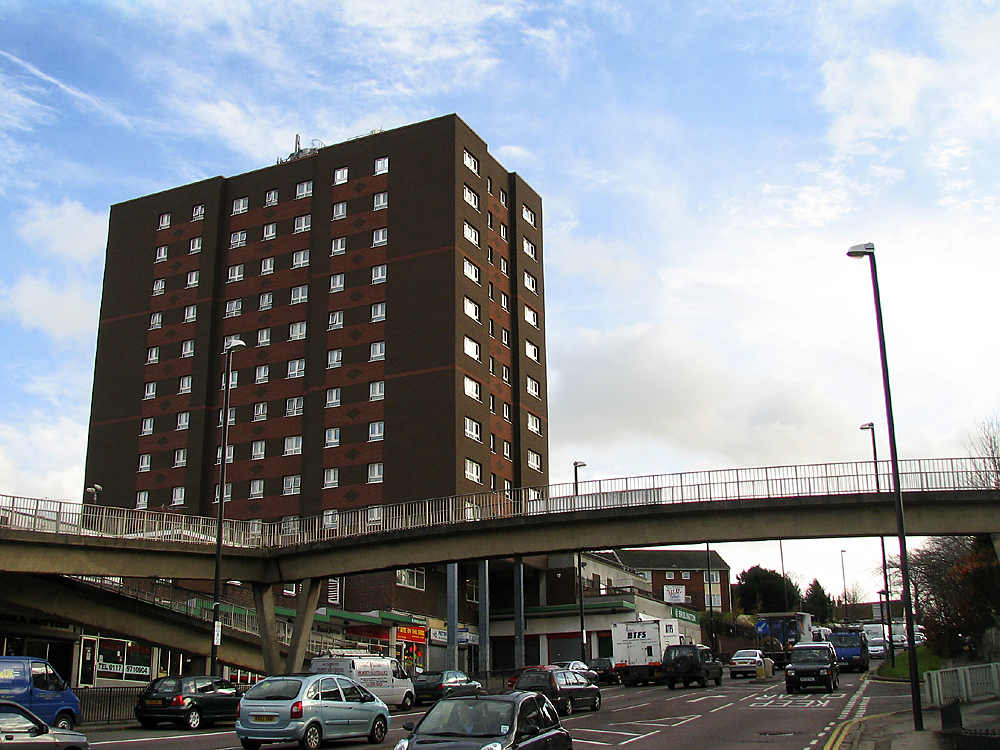
The A4 Brislington Hill on the boundary between East and West Brislington

Brislington is one of the larger areas of Bristol, hence the need for it to be split into two sections for the purposes of local government. The home ground of Brislington F.C. lies in Brislington East, as does St. Brendan's Sixth Form College. It also has a McDonald's restaurant, and a 6-acre (24,000 m^{2}) large nature reserve, called Eastwood farm, as well as a Co-op, and The Good Intent pub.

== Broom Hill ==
Broom Hill, sometimes spelled Broomhill and not to be confused with Broomhill near Fishponds in Frome Vale ward, is an area in Bristol to the north of Brislington.

The area is adjacent to the River Avon and crossed by the Great Western Railway, and some sidings, just east of Bristol Temple Meads station. Between Broom Hill and St Anne's, the railway passes through the St Anne's tunnel which was built by Isambard Kingdom Brunel in 1840; the portals at each end of the tunnel are Grade II* listed. The area is served by bus service 1.

Broomhill Junior School is a coeducational junior school, on Allison Road, that educates in years 3–6.

== St Anne's and St Anne's Park ==
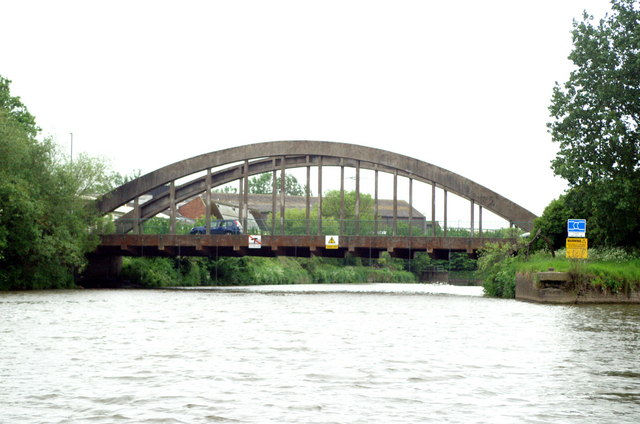
Bridge over the River Avon

St Anne's is a suburb bordering on Brislington, St George, St Phillips and Broom Hill. St Anne's Park is a housing estate that lies to the east of St Anne's. Both St Anne's and St Anne's Park are bounded to the north by a loop of the River Avon.
