= Bishopsworth =

Area of Bristol, England

Coordinates: 51.41477°N 2.62114°W

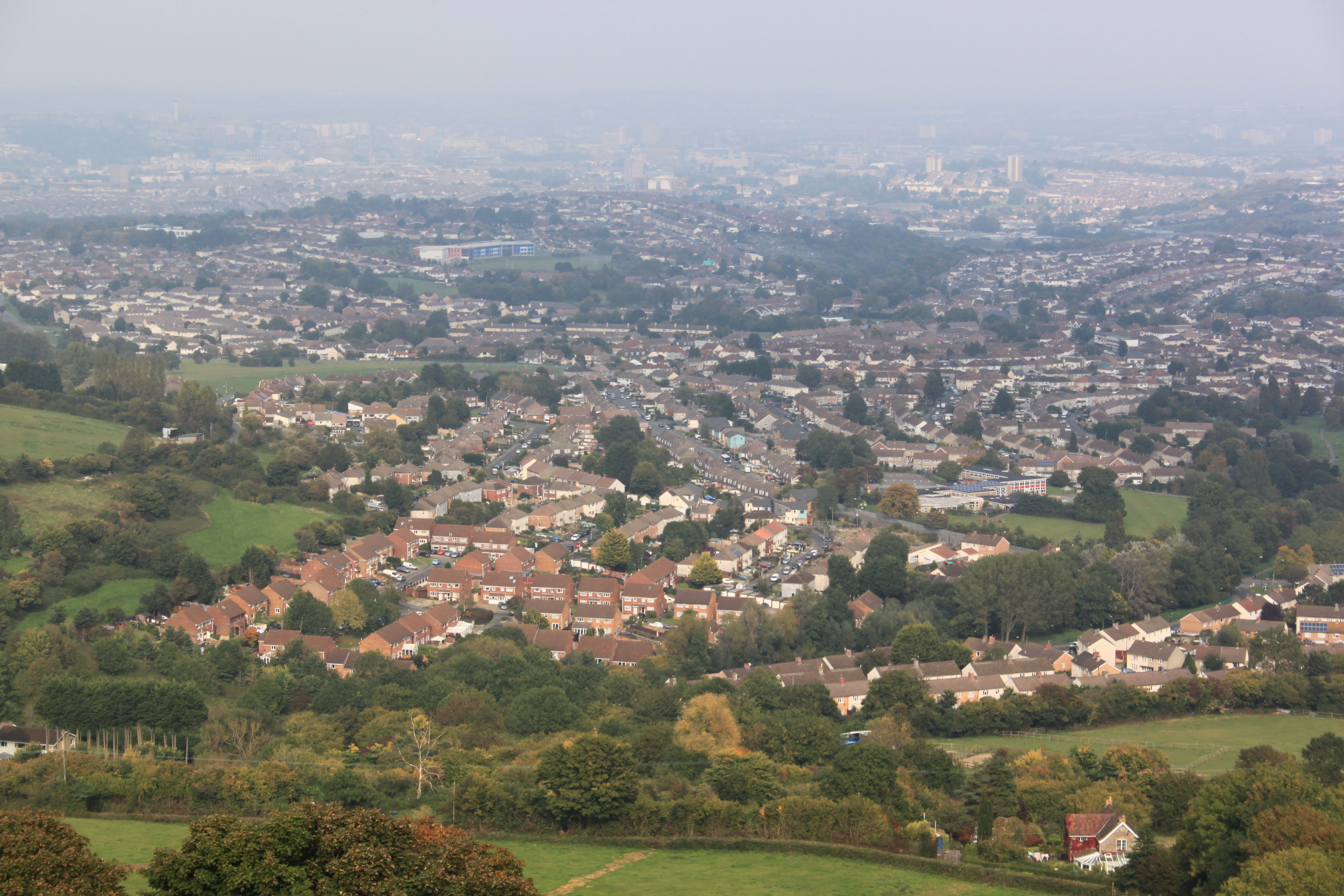
- A view over Withywood, in the foreground, and Bishopsworth from the tower of the Church of St Michael, Dundry

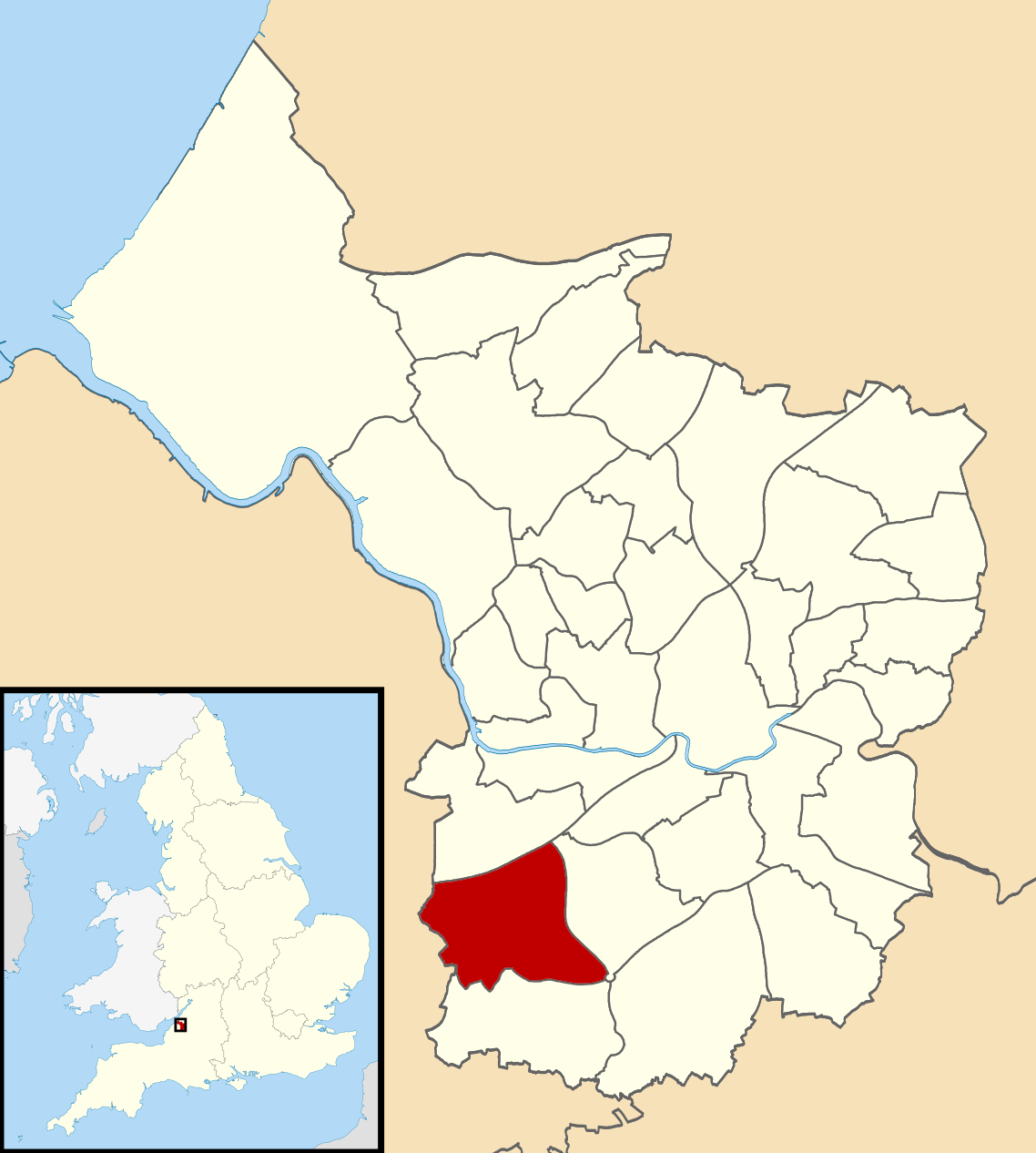
- Boundaries of the city council ward since 2016
- Population: 12,274 (2021)
- OS grid reference: ST569686
- Unitary authority: Bristol
- Ceremonial county: Bristol
- Region: South West
- Country: England
- Sovereign state: United Kingdom
- Post town: BRISTOL
- Postcode district: BS13
- Dialling code: 0117
- Police: Avon and Somerset
- Fire: Avon
- Ambulance: South Western
- UK Parliament: Bristol South

Bishopsworth is a suburban neighbourhood and electoral ward of the city of Bristol. It is located in the south of the city and has a high proportion of council housing. Local facilities include shops and pubs, a public library, community arts centre and an indoor skate park.

Bishopsworth electoral ward contains the Bedminster Down, Headley Park, Highridge and Uplands areas, and had a population of 12,274 at the 2021 census. Historically, as a civil parish separate from Bristol, Bishopsworth contained Hartcliffe and Withywood, and colloquially those are often still considered areas of Bishopsworth, though they are not within the current electoral ward.

== History ==
Bishopsworth was historically the tything of Bishport in the parish of Bedminster in Somerset. The rural southern parts of Bedminster became the civil parish of Bedminster Without from 1894 to 1898, when that parish was abolished and most of it became the new civil parish of Bishopsworth. Large parts of the civil parish were absorbed into Bristol in 1930 and 1933, and the civil parish was abolished on 1 April 1951 and merged with Bristol, parts went to Long Ashton and Dundry. In 1931 the parish had a population of 1,866.

In 1928 the ecclesiastical parish of Bedminster Down was created from the north of Bishopsworth in response to the development of the area. The ecclesiastical parishes of Hartcliffe and Withywood were separated off more recently.

== Church ==
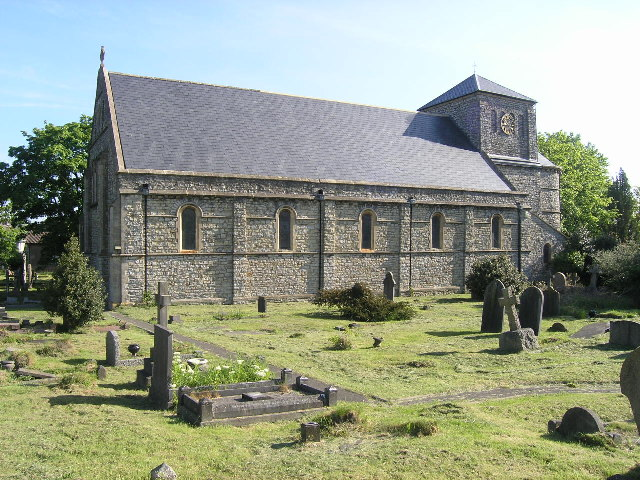
St Peter's Church, Bishopsworth

The first church in Bishopsworth was a small chapel dedicated to St Peter and St Paul built under an arrangement in 1194 between Robert Arthur, lord of the manor, and George de Dunster, prebendary of Bedminster. The agreement provided for a chaplain to visit from Bedminster on Wednesdays, Fridays and Sundays. This provision continued until dissolution in 1540. The chapel was converted into three cottages which stood until the Corporation demolished them in 1961 to make way for a swimming pool, which was built in the early 1970s. The pool has since been converted into a skate park, Campus Pool.

The present St Peter's Church, was built in 1841–1843. The neo-Norman design was the work of Samuel Charles Fripp. It is a grade II* listed building.

== Bishopsworth Manor and Listed Buildings ==
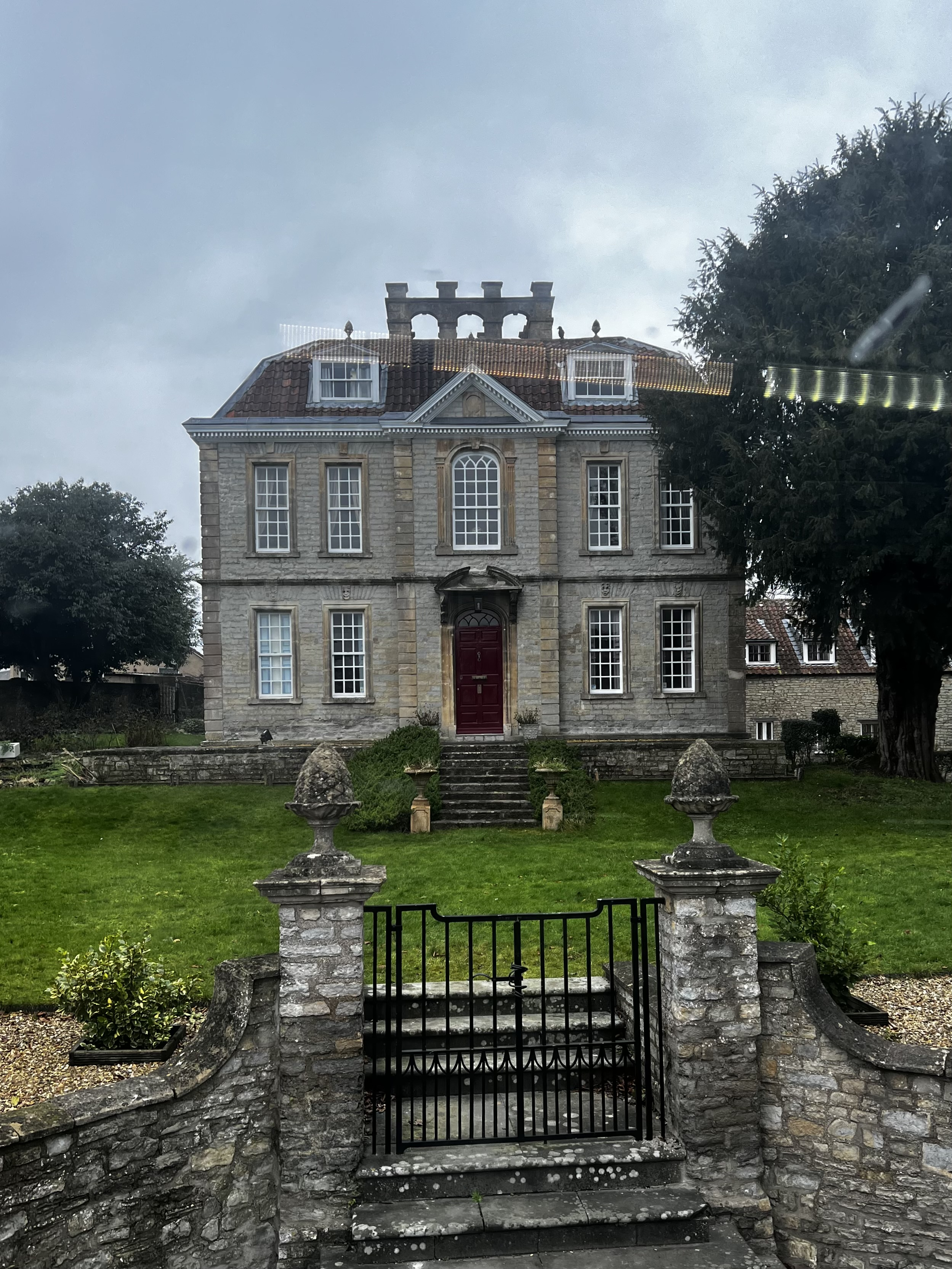
Bishopsworth Manor

Bishopsworth Manor was built around 1720 and is grade II* listed. It was owned in the 1970s and 1980s by the late Denis Bristow who restored much of it to its present state.

The School House and attached school rooms in church road were built around 1840 in a Tudor Revival style and is grade II listed. Chestnut Court dates from the early 18th century in an early Georgian style.

== Headley Park ==
Located south-west of Manor Woods Valley, the Headley Park housing estate was built in the east of Bishopsworth between 1934 and 1938. The area is served by The Maytree public house and Headley Park Church, ran by senior pastor Simon Dowland originally known as Crossways Tabernacle.

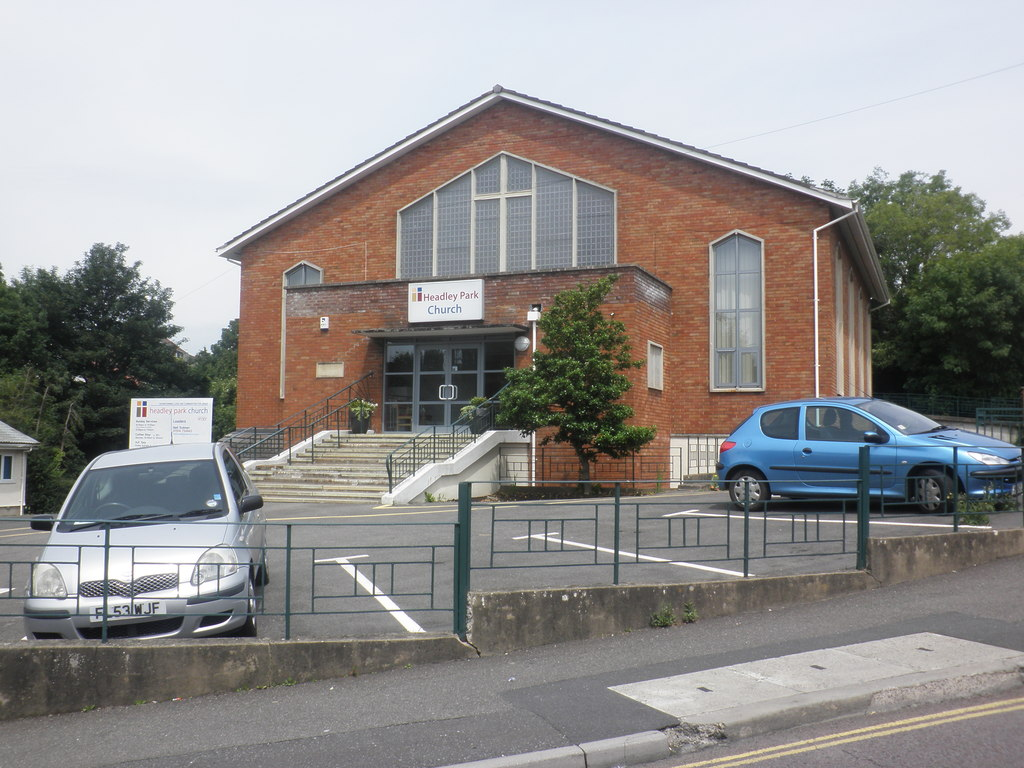
Headley Park Church

The neighbourhood holds one primary school, Headley Park Primary School; recently branded with a ‘Good’ rating by Ofsted

== Highridge ==
The most westernmost neighbourhood of Bishopsworth, Highridge is a mostly suburban area home to local football team Highridge United who play in division three of the Somerset County League

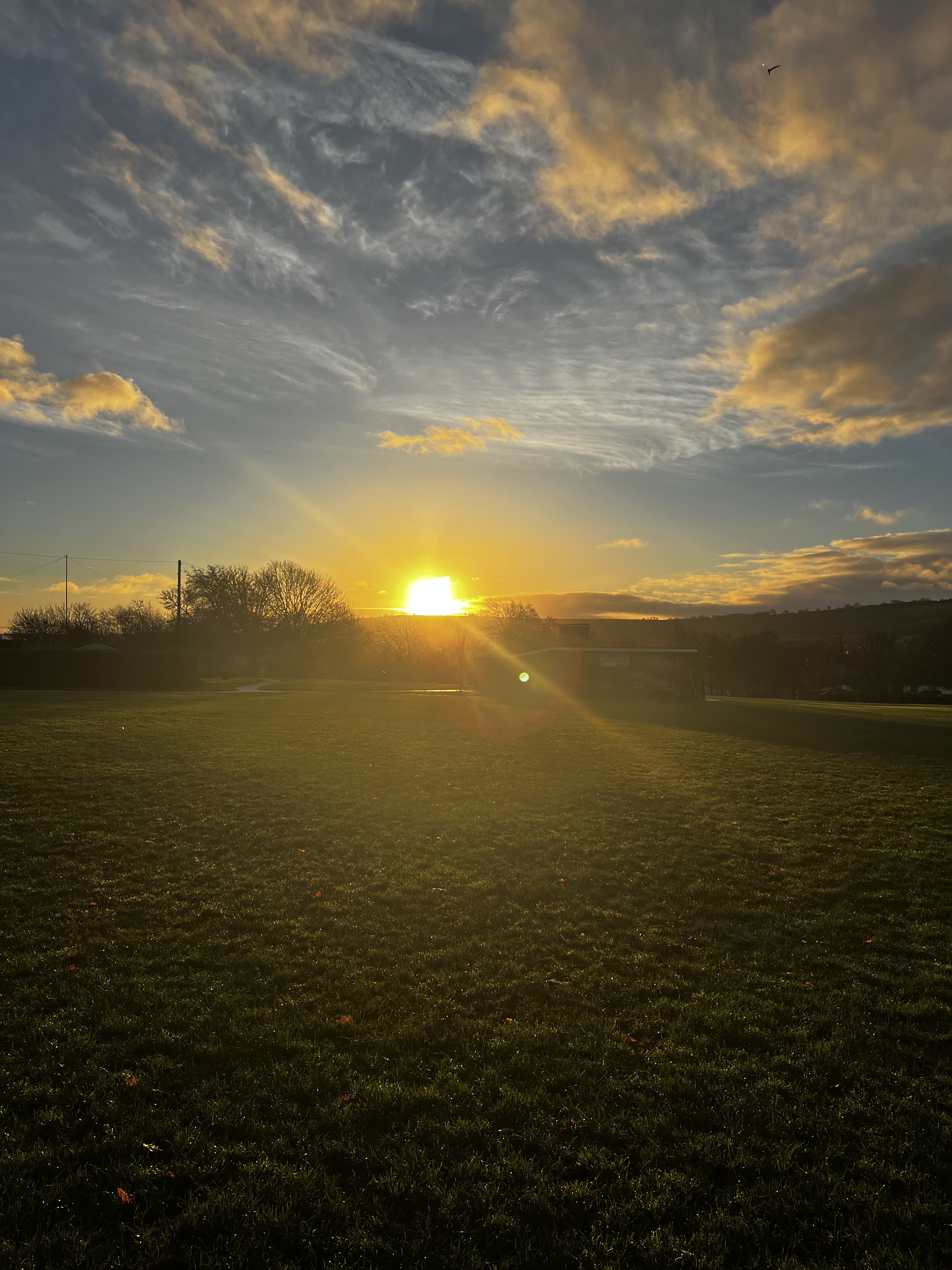
The sun rising on Kings Head Park.

The area holds a large open park, Kings Head Lane Park, with a play area for children and a football pitch.

== Imperial Retail Park ==
In the southeasternmost point of Bishopsworth, just northwest of the Hengrove Way Roundabout, is 347,000 square feet of retail space known as Imperial Park. The park holds 20 different stores and eateries. The B&Q is the largest unit in the retail park, spanning over 105,000 square feet.

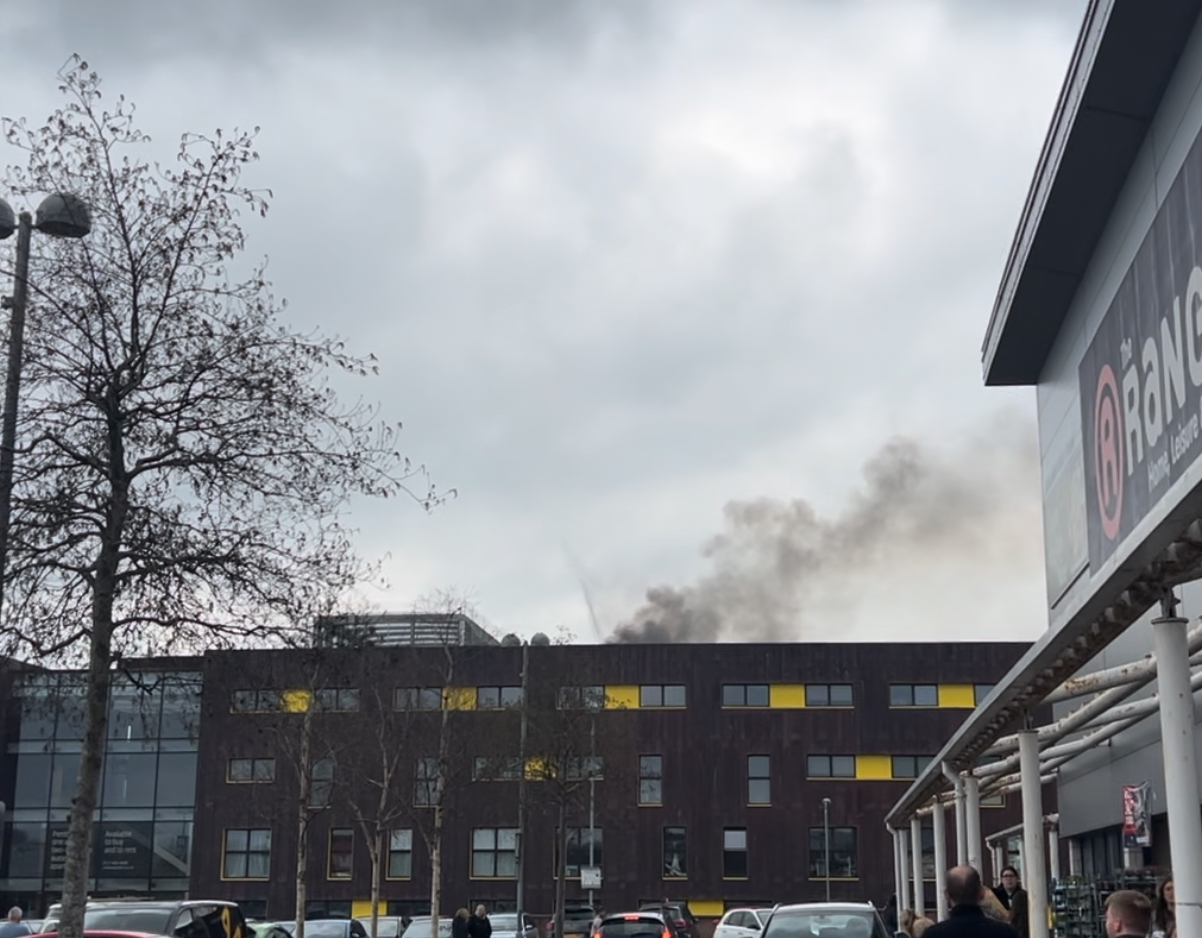
The smoke from the fire as seen from behind the Copper Building.

Just south of the retail park is the Lakeshore estate, originally built in 1967 as Imperial Tobacco Headquarters and then rebuilt in 2012 as an apartment block. In March 2025, a fire began in the top floor of the flat block.

== Electoral ward ==
Bishopsworth electoral ward is represented by two members on Bristol City Council. As of 2024, these are Richard Eddy of the Conservative Party and Susan Kollar of the Labour Party.

Councillors representing Bishopsworth ward since 2016
Elected	Councillor	Party	Electorate	Turnout
2024	Richard Eddy	Conservative	9,337	27.99%
2024	Susan Kollar	Labour	9,337	27.99%
2021	Richard Eddy	Conservative	9,332	34.80%
2021	Kevin Quartley	Conservative	9,332	34.80%
2016	Richard Eddy	Conservative	8,931	40.82%
2016	Kevin Quartley	Conservative	8,931	40.82%

The ward was created in 1974, initially represented by three members on Bristol City Council and one member on Avon County Council. Its boundaries were adjusted in 1981, 1999 and 2016. In the 2016 boundary changes, Withywood transferred from Bishopsworth to the new Hartcliffe and Withywood ward.
