= Hartcliffe and Withywood =

Electoral Ward

Coordinates: 51.4092°N 2.5987°W

- ward Bristol City Council
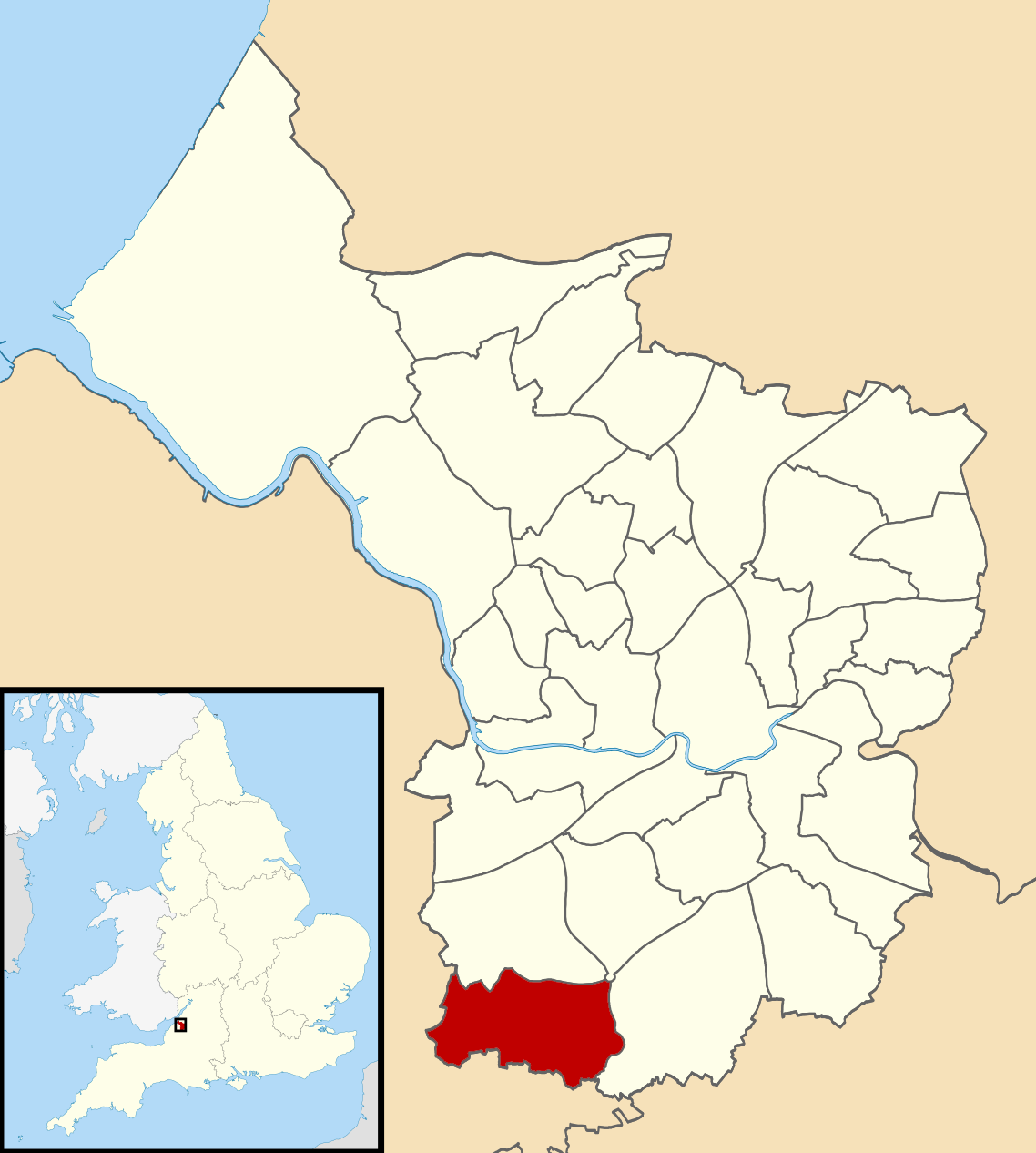
- Ward boundaries since 2016.
- County: Bristol
- Population: 19,059
- Electorate: 12,951

Current ward
- Created: 2016
- Councillor: Kerry Bailes (Labour)
- Councillor: Kirsty Tait (Labour)
- Councillor: Paul Goggin (Labour)
- UK Parliament constituency: Bristol South

Hartcliffe and Withywood is an electoral ward in Bristol, England.

== Area profile ==
For elections to the Parliament of the United Kingdom, Hartcliffe and Withywood is in Bristol South constituency.
