= Sport in Bristol =

Overview of sports traditions and activities in Bristol, England

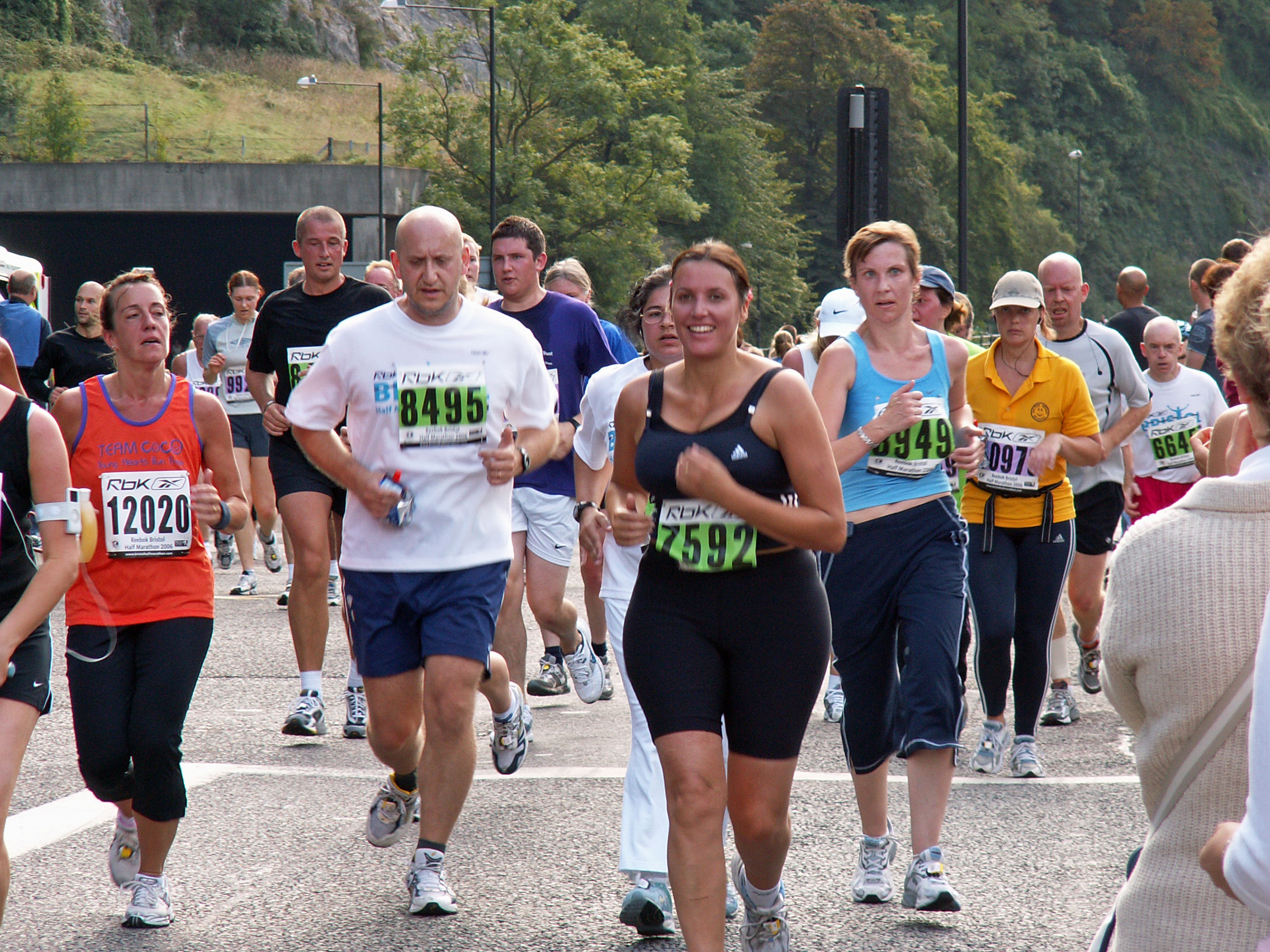
Fun runners taking part in the 2006 Bristol Half Marathon.

Bristol has a number of notable professional sports teams and a large number of active amateur sports clubs. There are also large numbers of participants in individual sports. The city has two Football League clubs: Bristol City F.C., who play in the second tier, and Bristol Rovers F.C., who play in the fourth tier. Gloucestershire County Cricket Club has its headquarters in the city. Bristol Bears are currently in Premiership Rugby.

Bristol City Council operates a number of sports centres and swimming pools. The city has hosted the 2001 IAAF World Half Marathon Championships and stage finishes and starts of the Tour of Britain cycle race. Facilities in Bristol were used as training camps for the 2012 London Olympics.

== Team sports ==
=== American football ===
American football team Bristol Aztecs are in the premier division of BAFA National Leagues. There are also two University American Football sides: The Bristol Barracuda from the University of Bristol and the UWE Bullets from UWE which both play in the BUAFL.

=== Australian Rules Football ===
A BARFL Australian Rules Football side, the Bristol Dockers, launched in 1990 used to compete in the Southern England region, but now compete in the London Social Division and are still going strong. The Dockers have strong links with Western Gaels Gaelic Football Club who are based in Bristol with a lot of players togging out for both sides.

=== Baseball ===
The Bristol Baseball club has a number of teams, their original being the Bristol Badgers, who have played in the British Baseball Federation most years. The club's other teams include the Bristol Bats and Bristol Buccaneers, which have played in the BBF and the South West Baseball League. A women's team, the Bristol Bobcats, has been formed but not yet entered a league as of 2020. The club was founded in 2008 in Southmead before moving to Failand in 2011, and now has a growing facility in Keynsham. In 2021, two new teams were formed; the Brunels, a development team & the Bolts, a junior team.

=== Basketball ===
The city is home to professional basketball team Bristol Flyers, a member of the British Basketball League, which they joined in 2014 following an incorporation into Stephen Lansdown's 'Bristol Sport' group. Semi-professional basketball team Bristol Hurricanes play in the D1 National basketball league, the second tier of British basketball.

There is a growing basketball community in Bristol with a host of men's and women's local league sides playing in the West of England League. In addition to these the city is home to the English Basketball League clubs Bristol Storm Basketball Club based at the City Academy in the centre of Bristol, and in South Gloucestershire the Bristol Academy Basketball Club based at the South Gloucestershire and Stroud College WISE campus.

=== Cricket ===
Bristol hosts first-class cricket side, Gloucestershire C.C.C. for which W.G. Grace famously played. Bristol was host to the 2007 Indoor Cricket World Cup, the first time the event has been held in England. The club's Country Cricket Ground has also hosted twelve One Day International matches, up until May 2009. Somerset County Cricket Club played some of their games at the Imperial Tobacco Ground in South Bristol until 1966.

=== Football ===
Bristol has two professional football teams Bristol City, who play in the Football League Championship, the second tier of English football and Bristol Rovers, who play in League Two, the fourth tier. City were founded in 1897, when Bristol South End turned professional and changed its name to Bristol City. In 1900 the club merged with local rivals Bedminster, who had been founded as Southville in 1887. They joined the Football League in 1901. Rovers were founded in 1883, originally named Black Arabs before being renamed Eastville Rovers followed by Bristol Eastville Rovers before adopting its current title in 1899. Rovers joined the Football League in 1920 and remained there until 2014 when they were relegated to the Football Conference before regaining promotion back to the Football League the following year.

There are a number of non-League teams in Bristol including Bristol Manor Farm F.C., Hengrove Athletic F.C., Brislington F.C., Roman Glass St George F.C. and Bristol Telephones F.C. There are also a large number of teams in the Bristol and Suburban Association Football League, Bristol Premier Combination, Bristol and District League, and the Bristol Downs Football League.

Bristol Academy Women's Football Club, based at South Gloucestershire and Stroud College. Bristol City Women's F.C. Bristol City Women's Football Club was founded in 1990, but dissolved in 2008, with many of the players joining AFC TeamBath Ladies.

=== Gaelic football ===
Gaelic football and hurling were represented in Bristol during the 20th century, and two football teams have survived in Bristol; St. Nicks GAA & Western Gaels, who both play in the Gloucestershire league. Both sides train and play at Gloucestershire County's home pitch situated in St. Mary's Old Boys Rugby Club, Almondsbury. Local competition beyond the city comes from teams in Cardiff, Newport, and Gloucester. Western Gaels have close ties with the local Australian rules team, the Bristol Dockers. Due to the similarity of the games, players of one often find it easy to adapt to the other's code.

=== Handball ===
Bristol Handball Club are the sole club and are based at The City Academy Bristol, though they play their "home" games at the Princess Royal Sports Complex in Wellington, Somerset due to lack of facilities in Bristol.

=== Ice Hockey ===
The Bristol Pitbulls are an ice hockey team founded in 2009, playing in the English National Ice Hockey League, South Division 2. After the closure of Bristol Ice Rink in 2012, the team moved to Oxfordshire where they stayed until 2021, eventually the Pitbulls moved to Planet Ice, Cribbs Causeway, South Gloucestershire.

=== Korfball ===
Korfball is a fast-paced mixed gender team sport, with similarities to netball and basketball. A team consists of eight players; four females and four males. As of 2024, Bristol has three clubs, Bristol City, Bristol Hornets and Bristol Thunder, and a university team from University of Bristol, who make up the South West Korfball League along with clubs from Exeter, Taunton, Gloucester and a university team from Bath.

=== Rugby Union ===
Bristol is home to professional rugby union club Bristol Bears, who play in the top level of the English rugby union system (Premiership) after being promoted in the 2017/18 season. Clifton RFC and Dings Crusaders both compete at the fourth level in National League 2 South, while Old Redcliffians compete in National Division Three South, which is a fifth level league.

=== Rugby League ===
Bristol also has a Rugby League Conference side, the Bristol Sonics.

=== Speedway ===
Speedway racing was staged, with breaks, at the Knowle Stadium from 1928 to 1960, when it was closed and the site redeveloped. The sport briefly returned to the city in the 1970s when the Bristol Bulldogs raced at Eastville Stadium.

=== Octopush ===
Bristol Underwater Hockey club are the city's competitive team for the sport. They train at Hengrove Park Leisure Centre. In the 2023 Nationals Competition, Bristol came 4th in group C. In the 2023 Nautilus Tournament, Bristol A finished 2nd in Division 2 with Bristol B finishing 4th in Division 6.

== Individual sports ==
=== Athletics ===
There is an annual half marathon held around the city centre, and in 2001 the city hosted the 10th IAAF World Half Marathon Championships. There are many active clubs, the largest being Bristol & West, along with Westbury Harriers and Great Western Runners.

=== Cycling ===
From 1993 to 2014 the city council organised an annual charity bicycling event, Bristol's Biggest Bike Ride, which attracted around 4,000 participants. The 2011 event was cancelled at short notice due to a crash on the Portway. In 2015 it was replaced by Sky Ride Bristol, part of a series of events organised by British Cycling, which ran over a shorter route in the city centre; however the Sky Ride event was cancelled after the 2016 event when Sky ended its sponsorship.

The Tour of Britain has visted Bristol several times in recent years. Stage 4 of the 2014 edition finished in Bristol, with Michał Kwiatkowski winning on the Downs after the climb of Bridge Valley Road. 2016 saw a double stage in Bristol, with a morning time trial won by Tony Martin and an afternoon circuit race won by Rohan Dennis. In 2018, stage 3 started and finished in Bristol, with Julian Alaphilippe winning in a sprint. Its predecessors the Milk Race and PruTour also visited Bristol.

A mountain biking area is around Ashton Court, with the Timberland trails the main route. Other routes are in the Plantation, the 50-acre wood and Leigh Woods.

=== Darts ===
Local leagues include the Courage Darts League, North Avon Darts League, Redfield & District Mens Darts League and Bristol Brunel Darts League. Professional Mark Dudbridge is from Bristol as is Chris Mason.

=== Golf ===
There are several golf clubs: The Bristol Golf Club (2000), Bristol and Clifton Golf Club (1891), Filton Golf Club. Golf (1909), Long Ashton Golf Club (1893), Shirehampton Park Golf Club (1904), and Stockwood Vale Golf Club.

=== Motorsport ===
There are several motorsport clubs in Bristol. Bristol clubs run a variety of events, including sprints, hillclimbs, trials, autotests, autosolo, rallies and navigational events. Bristol Motor Club was formed in 1911 and was responsible for the inception of racing at nearby Castle Combe Circuit in 1950 as well as being involved in creating the discipline of autosolo. Pegasus Motor Club was formed near the end of World War II, originally as a motorsport club for employees of the Bristol Aeroplane Company at Filton. Post-war, the club was involved in the creation of the 500cc Formula. The club hosts motorsport and social activities, and organises both a Track Day and Sprint at Castle Combe Circuit. Bristol also has two rally orientated Motor Clubs: Tavern Motor Club and White Horse Motor Club.

Joe Fry has set a number of records in the Freikaiserwagen and events in the city. Oval track racing was held at Knowle Stadium from 1928 to 1960, when it closed for redevelopment. The sport briefly returned to the city during the 1970s, when the Bulldogs raced at Eastville Stadium. Speed trials have been held in Clapton-in-Gordano, Shipham, Backwell, Naish, Dyrham Park, Filton Airfield and in Whitchurch (when it was Bristol's airport), and a 1983 RAC Rally stage was held at Ashton Court west of the city. A sporting trial is held in woodland on the city's outskirts, and a classic trial is held in the hills around the city.

=== Rowing ===
In rowing, Bristol hosts City of Bristol Rowing Club, UWE Boat Club, and University of Bristol Boat Club.

=== Swimming ===
Bristol has six municipal swimming pools (Easton, Henbury, Horfield, Jubilee, Bristol South and Hengrove Park. Hengrove is a 50-metre pool), as well as the Bristol University students union pool. There is also the Filton Dolphin swimming pool, and just outside Bristol are swimming pools at Kingswood, Longwell Green, Keynsham and Backwell. Most of the pools offer a 'learn to swim' programme. Advanced swimmers from these programmes are encouraged to join one of Bristol's competitive swimming clubs, usually the club most closely associated with the swimming pool.

Bristol also has five competitive swimming clubs, City of Bristol, Bristol Henleaze, Bristol North, Bristol and South Gloucestershire and Out to Swim (Bristol). Out to Swim (Bristol) only accepts swimmers over the age of twenty-one; the other clubs start around age 5 – 6. Bristol Henleaze, Bristol North, and Bristol and South Gloucestershire have small but successful 'learn to swim' programmes, aimed at developing young swimmers for competitive swimming, and also offer masters swimming. All five clubs do competitive swimming; the four non-masters clubs also take part in team-based competitions in various swimming leagues around Bristol and the South West. The City of Bristol swimming club is an ASA-supported network club, with links to other clubs in the region (Bristol and South Gloucestershire, Clevedon, Calne, Keynsham, Backwell and Bath) to also promote performance swimming.

City of Bristol also has sections for water polo and synchronised swimming. It was chosen as an ASA Beacon club in these two disciplines to provide a regional centre of excellence There is a fin swimming club, Neptune Finswimming Club.

Finally, with Henleaze Swimming Club, there is an open-water club based at Henleaze Lake. Henleaze Swimming Club also has an angling section for its lake users.

=== Tennis and Squash ===
Bristol Lawn Tennis and Squash Club, Bristol Central Tennis Club, and Westbury Park Tennis Club. Former world Top 5 professional tennis player Jo Durie is a Bristolian.

== Sports venues ==
=== Ashton Gate ===
Ashton Gate is the home of Bristol City F.C., Bristol City Women and the rugby union team Bristol Bears. It has hosted Rugby World Cup games. It was considerably redeveloped between 2014 and 2016 with new stands on the west and south sides.

=== Memorial Stadium ===
The Memorial Stadium is dedicated to the memory of the rugby union players of the city killed during World War I. It is the home ground of Bristol Rovers, and was previously the home of the rugby union team Bristol F.C. (now Bristol Bears).

=== County Ground ===
The County Ground (also known as Nevil Road) is home to the Gloucestershire County Cricket Club and has also hosted ODI cricket matches.

=== Bristol Harbour ===
Bristol Harbour hosts several rowing races, including the Varsity Match (UWE, Bristol v Bristol University) and Combined Bristol Rowing Clubs Regatta. A number of local sailing club regattas are also held throughout the season.

Powerboat racing was held in the docks from 1972 until 1990, attracting crowds of up to 250,000. With tight turns and high dock walls, the course presented dangers and there were seven fatalities in that time.

=== Bristol City Council sports centres ===
City of Bristol Gymnastics Centre is a lottery funded facility in Hartcliffe. Whitchurch Sports Centre has a running track, badminton, bowls, squash – often hosts professional boxing. St. Paul's Community Sports Academy is a Sports Centre in St Pauls. South Bristol Sports Centre, a sports centre in Knowle in the south of the city.

== Multi-sport and international events ==
=== 10th IAAF World Half Marathon championships ===
The 10th IAAF World Half Marathon Championships were hosted by the city in 2001 on a course through the city centre and alongside the Floating Harbour and the Portway, Bristol. Paula Radcliffe retained her World Half Marathon title in a time of 1hr 06mins 47secs, 4 seconds outside the world record. Haile Gebrselassie won the men's race in a time of 60min 03sec.

=== London 2012 Olympics ===
The University of the West of England's (UWE) Centre for Sport and Bristol University were chosen as training venues for the Kenyan Olympic team for the 2012 London Olympics. UWE was also selected to host a training camp for the 2012 Summer Paralympics.

=== England 2018 Football World Cup bid ===
In July 2009, Bristol launched a bid be a host city of England is successful for its bid for the 2018 FIFA World Cup. The bid would centre on the new stadium to be built by Bristol City F.C. at Ashton Vale. In December 2009, the Football Association announced that Bristol would be one of the host cities in the bid which was ultimately unsuccessful.

== Notable people ==
- Ricky Lambert – Current England and former Bristol Rovers footballer
- Glenn Catley – boxer
- Tom Cribb – 19th century bare-knuckle boxer
- Robin Cousins – competitive figure skater
- Jo Durie – leading tennis player
- Joe Fry – racing driver
- John Atyeo – Bristol City footballer
- W. G. Grace – leading cricketer
- Lee Haskins – flyweight boxer
- Ian Holloway – Bristol Rovers player and football manager
- Gary Mabbutt – England and Bristol Rovers Footballer
- Arthur Milton – England cricketer and footballer
- Billy Wedlock – England and Bristol City footballer
- Judd Trump – Snooker player and Bristol City fan
- Jenny Jones (Snowboarder) - British snowboarder; winner of the bronze medal at the 2014 winter Olympics in Sochi, in Women's slopestyle
- Lando Norris - 2025 Formula One World Champion and driver for McLaren

== See also ==
- Culture in Bristol
