= Victoria Park, Bristol =

Park in Bristol, England

Victoria Park
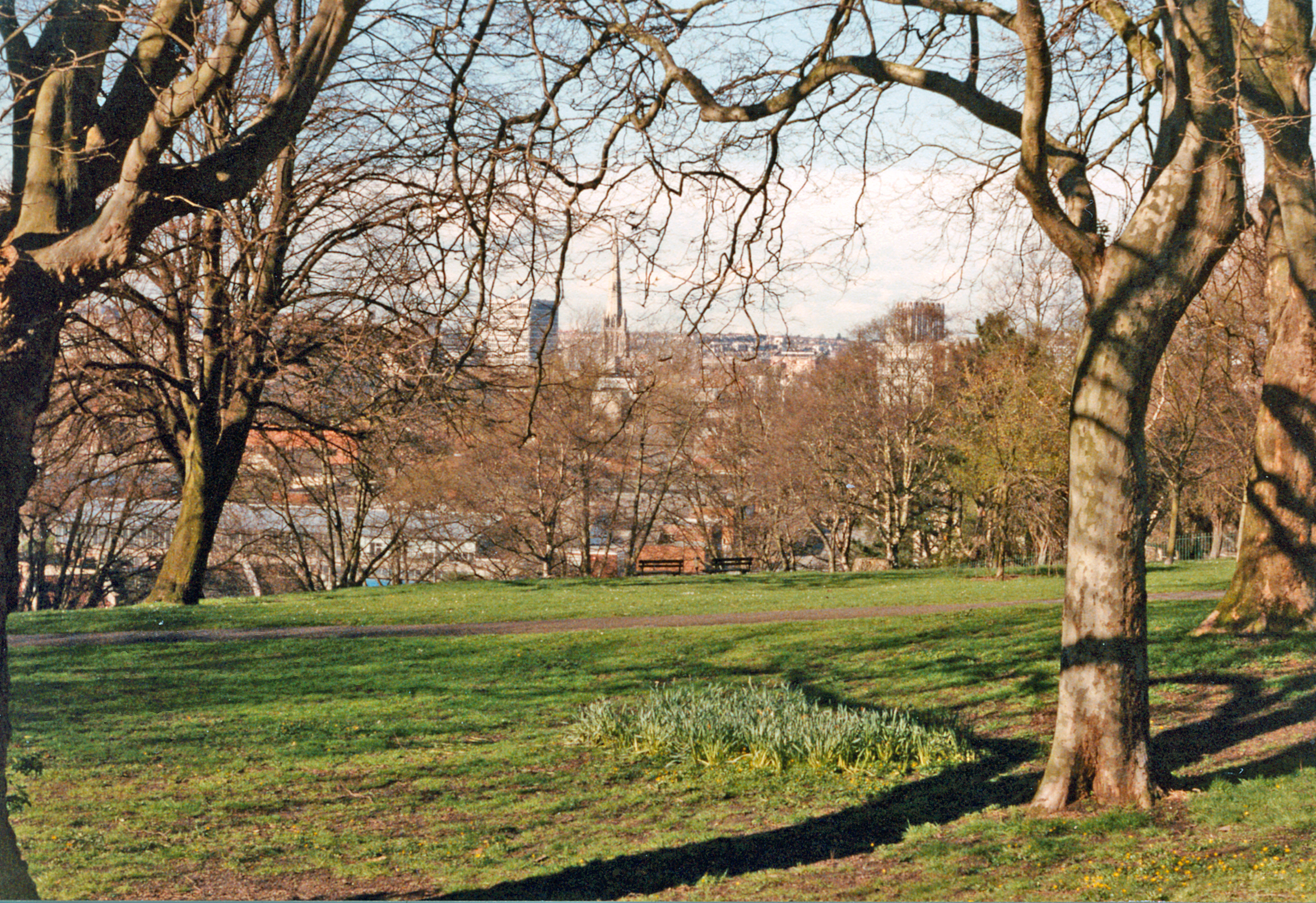

- Location within Bristol
- Type: Public park
- Location: Bedminster, Bristol, England
- Coordinates: 51°26′27″N 2°35′13″W
- Area: 51.5 acres (20.8 ha)
- Created: c. 1885
- Operator: Bristol City Council
- Status: Open year round
- Website: www.bristol.gov.uk/museums-parks-sports-culture/victoria-park

Victoria Park is a park and open space near Bedminster, Bristol, on Windmill hill. It lies to the east of Bedminster railway station and south of the Bristol to Exeter line.

The park features tennis courts, a bowling green, a skate park, a 1.7-kilometre (1.1-mile) marked route for joggers, various exercise stations and a children's play area.

== History ==
The park was established in the 1880s following the expansion of Bedminster as a residential and industrial area within Bristol. The council bought 51.5 acres (20.8 ha) of land from Sir John Henry Greville Smyth for £20,678 (now £2,351,000), though the land had been used as an unofficial open space and meeting area for some time before this. By 1887, a children's play area had been installed which became immediately popular. The streets around the park were laid out in 1891. By 1898, four rangers were permanently employed in the park, and a bandstand had been installed. Several drinking fountains and a circular pond had also been established.

In 1984, a Water Maze was built in the park, modelled on the bosses on the roof of the church of St Mary Redcliffe. It was built over a 12th-century pipeline supplying water from a spring at Knowle to Redcliffe, which is the subject of the annual St Mary Redcliffe Pipe Walk. The maze was opened in conjunction with work elsewhere to stop sewage water discharging into the River Avon.

== Events ==
A number of annual events take place in the park. It is a performance venue for the Art on the Hill Arts Trail, which has been held on the first weekend in October since 2007. The park has also hosted a number of open-air films, profits from which are used towards its upkeep.
