= Bath City F.C. =

Bath City
- Full name: Bath City Football Club
- Nickname: The Romans
- Founded: 1889; 137 years ago (as Bath AFC)
- Ground: Cannon Clarke Stadium @ Twerton Park
- Capacity: 8,840 (1,006 seated)
- Owner: Bath City Supporters' Society
- Chairman: David McDonagh
- Manager: Scott Bartlett
- League: Southern League Premier Division South
- 2025–26: National League South, 21st of 24 (relegated)
- Website: bathcityfc.com
Home colours	Away colours

Bath City Football Club is a semi-professional football club based in Bath, Somerset, England. The club is affiliated to the Somerset FA and currently competes in the Southern League Premier Division South, the seventh tier of English football. Nicknamed the "Romans", the club was founded in 1889 and have played their home matches at Twerton Park since 1932.

The club has never played in the Football League, though Bath were heavily discussed as an entrant in the 1930s and 1940s, and came closest via election in 1978 and 1985. During the Second World War, the club won the Football League North. Bath have reached the third round of the FA Cup six times, beating league sides such as; Crystal Palace (in 1931), Millwall (in 1959), and Cardiff City (in 1992). Bath were crowned Southern League champions in 1960 and 1978; one of the highest levels of non-League football at the time. From 1980 to 1997, the team spent sixteen years in what is now The National League, with Bath finishing fourth in the 1984–85 season, their highest ever league position.

Bath City hold no real fierce rivalries, albeit the fixtures with the most animosity are the local derbies shared with fellow Somerset club Yeovil Town, and more recently with Wiltshire club, Chippenham Town. The club's nickname stems from Bath's ancient Roman history. The first recorded attire the club wore were blue shorts and white shirts in 1900, though Bath City changed to black and white stripes in the early 20th Century and the colours have remained since. The club's crest depicts the Borough walls, which encircled the old city centre during medieval times. Twerton Park once held up to 20,000 fans, with the club's record attendance of 18,020 being recorded in 1960.

== History ==
=== Formation and early years (1889–1925) ===
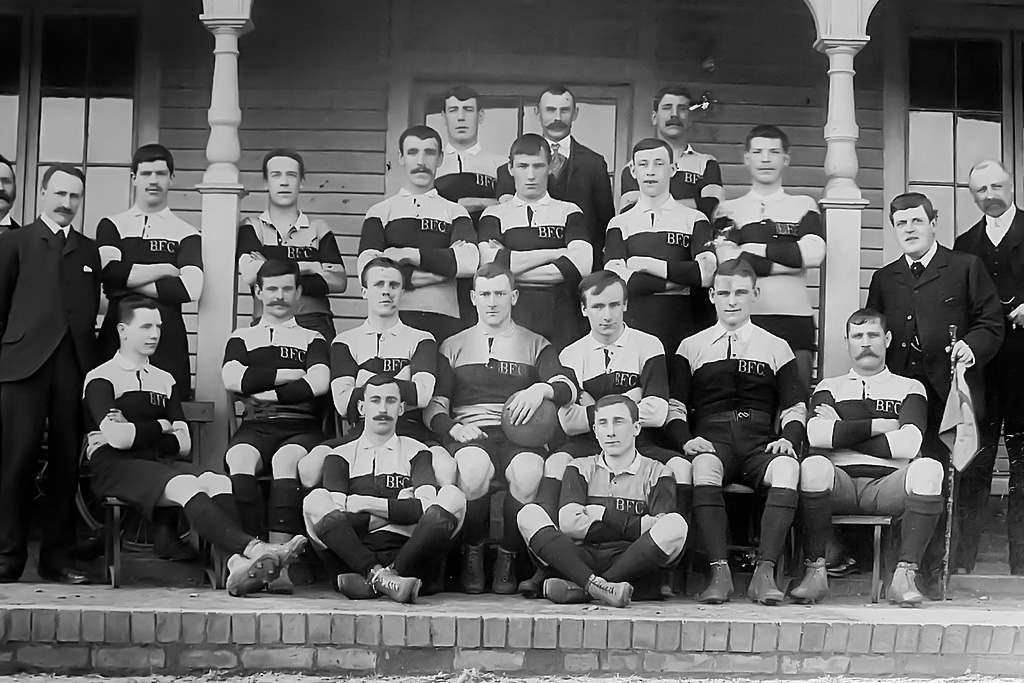
The first Bath City squad, taken in 1890 at the North Parade Ground.

On 19 July 1889 Bath City were formed as Bath AFC at the Christopher hotel in the city centre. The team commenced play at the North Parade Ground in Bathwick. Bath competed in their first ever recorded match on 10 October 1889, in which they lost 9–4 to Trowbridge Town. By 1891, Bath were struggling heavily financially. As a consequence, the club amalgamated with the local rugby club; Bath Football Club. For an entire nine years the team ceased play. Until, on 11 September 1900, Bath AFC was re-formed, led by cricketer William Hyman. Bath City FC, by name, was officially born.

Bath joined a multi-county division for the first time in 1908, competing in the Western League Division Two. Charles Pinker was appointed manager the following year, and that season they moved up to The Western League Division One. Bath City remained in the Western League until 1921, in which they joined the Southern League, regarded as the strongest division outside the Football League at the time. In 1921, manager Charles Pinker left the club after a successful twelve-year period. He was replaced by former Swindon Town player, Billy Tout who retained this role until 1925.

=== Large crowds and missing out on Football League (1925–1958) ===
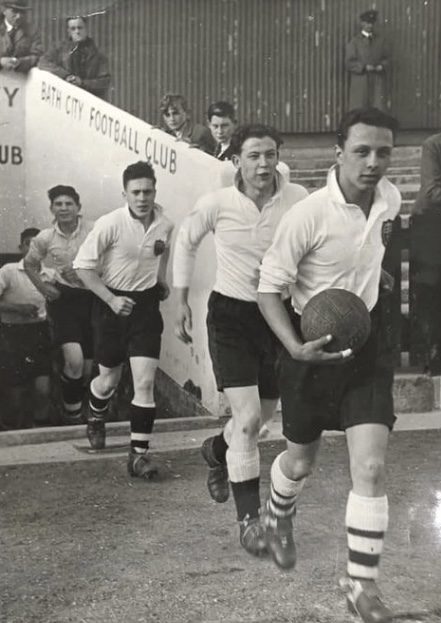
Bath players entering from the Grandstand of Twerton Park before a match in the 1930s.

The following year Bath City were on the brink of extinction. However, on 21 August 1926, there was a large meeting with the club's supporters and officials, and the club was "saved". The following season, under newly appointed Ted Davis, the team finished Southern League runners up. Being praised "the best in the club's history" by the Bath Chronicle, and they were runners up again in 1933. During this period, Bath were heavily being discussed for entry into the Football League Third Division. After over a decade at the club, Davis left Bath for Colchester United in 1937. Former Liverpool player, Alex Raisbeck acted as first team coach leading into the second world war.

Raisbeck left the position to a returning Davis in 1940. Upon the outbreak of the Second World War, Bath City were accepted into the temporary Football League North, competing with the likes of Bristol City and Aston Villa. That season Bath competed in their highest attended game to date, playing Aston Villa at Villa Park in front of over 30,000. The team won the league under Davis. In 1944, the club were, once again, in talks for entry into the Third Division. However, the FA refused Football League entry to non-League clubs. Davis left Bath in 1947, and was replaced by Vic Woodley, though he left in 1950 after four mid-lower placed finishes, and was replaced by Eddie Hapgood.

=== Glory, yoyo years and nationwide football (1958–1996) ===
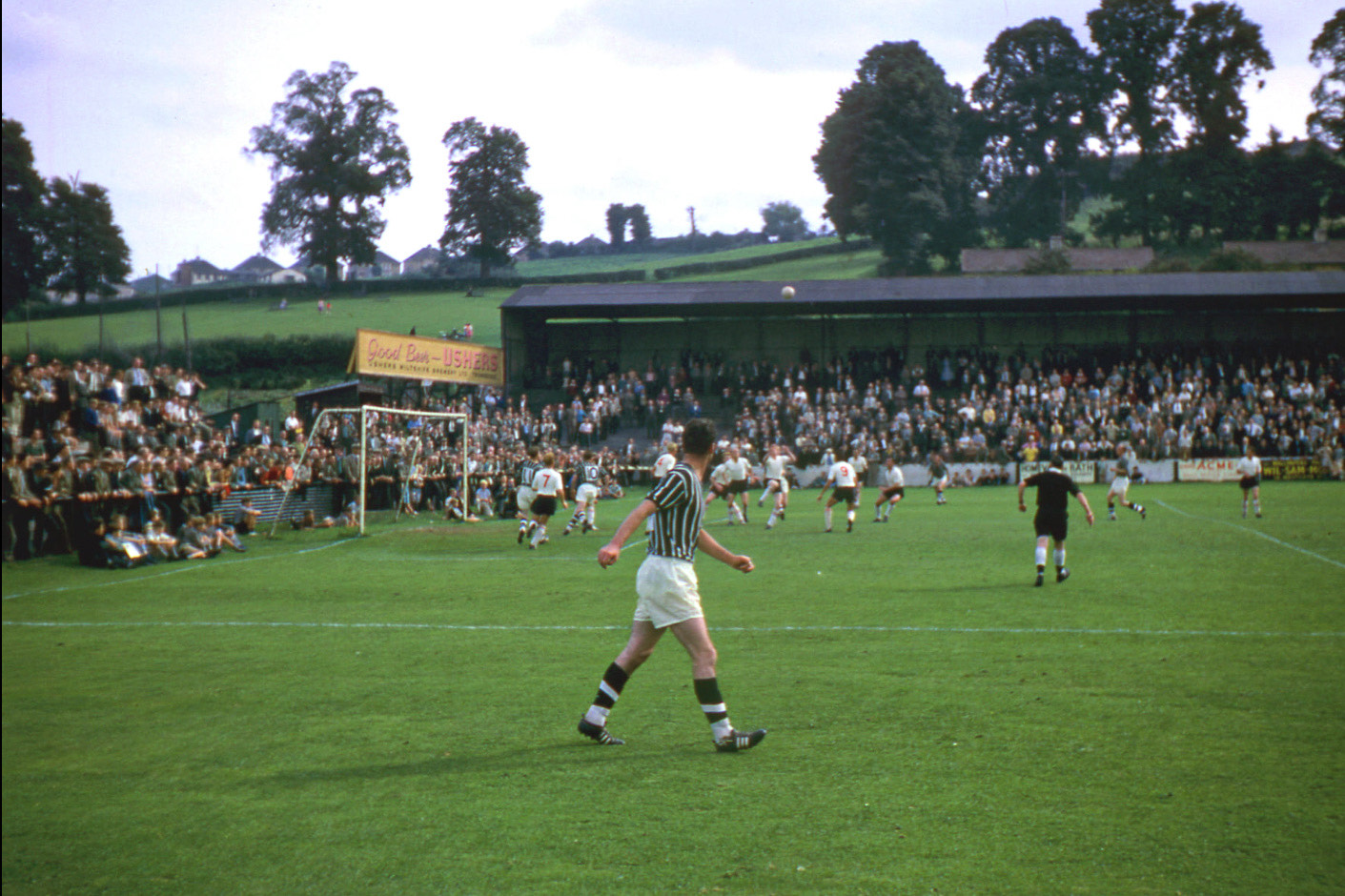
A match at Twerton Park in 1962.

Bob Hewison, appointed in 1958, arguably built the strongest side in the club's history, signing players such as Alan Skirton, Stan Mortensen and Tony Book, captained by Charlie Fleming. The team went on to win the Southern League in the 1959–60 season, at Huish Park. In the same season, Bath played Brighton & Hove Albion at Twerton Park in the FA Cup third round, in front of a record crowd of 18,020, but lost 1–0. Two years after Hewison's departure, in spring of 1963, Malcolm Allison was appointed manager. That season Bath finished third, and reached the FA Cup third round. Soon after however, under Welsh manager Ivor Powell, Bath City were relegated for the first time ever in their history.

From 1964 to 1974 Bath City became a yo-yo club, being relegated from, and promoted back to the Premier Division on six occasions. Two years into Brian Godfrey's reign, in the 1977–78 season, the team won the Southern League title for a second time, in front of "hoards of travelling fans." Under Godfrey, the club made it to two Anglo-Italian Cup finals In 1977 and 1978; They fell short of election to the Football League by three votes in 1978. As a result, the club became founding members of the Alliance Premier League, and played nation-wide football for the first time. Albeit, the attendances from 1984 to 1989 were some of the worst in Bath City's history, with seasonal gates averaging between just 500 and 600. In 1991 Tony Ricketts was appointed manager. They reached the third round of the FA Cup during the 1993–94 season, losing 4–1 to Stoke City at Twerton Park in the third round in front of 7,000 fans.

=== Decline and subsequent relegation (1996–2017) ===
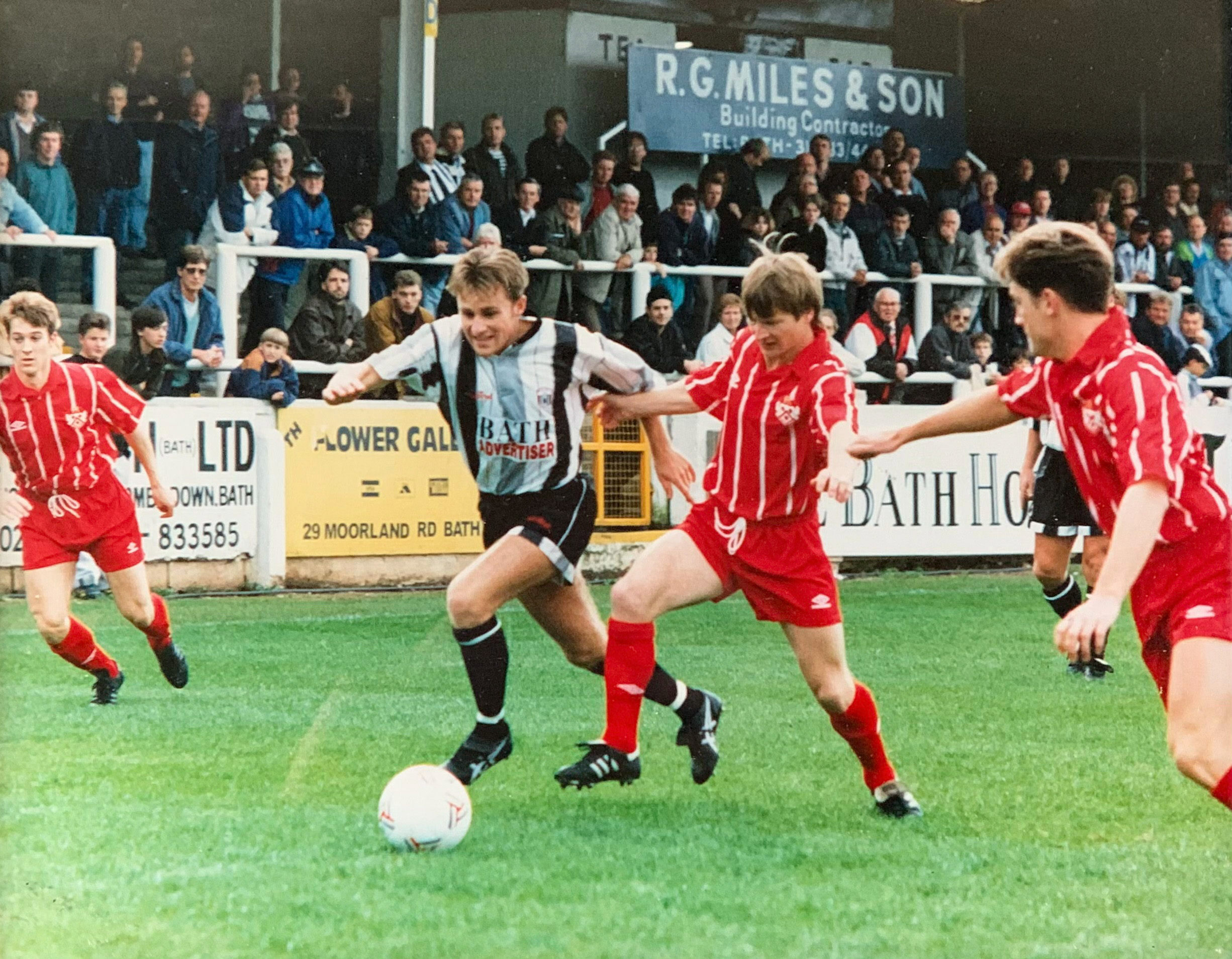
Bath vs Kettering Town in 1992.

Following decades of playing in the top division of non-League football, Bath were relegated from the Conference in 1997. In 2004, the club lost in the FA Cup second round to Peterborough United. John Relish was appointed manager on 22 June 2005. The subsequent year, they were promoted, winning the Southern League in 2006–07, finishing on 91 points. Under new manager Addie Britton, Bath beat League Two side Grimsby Town in the FA Cup first round in 2009, only to lose to Forest Green Rovers in the second round. On 9 May 2010 Bath City beat Woking 1–0 in the play-off final, and returned to the Conference.

Bath finished tenth in the 2010–11 Football Conference. However, they had a poor season in 2011–12 and were relegated. A year later, Britton subsequently stepped down as first team coach. He was replaced by Australian manager, Lee Howells. "The Big Bath City Bid" was launched by Ken Loach in the summer of 2015, receiving support from former Manchester United player, Eric Cantona. On 5 May 2017, the club completed its transition to community ownership. On the field, they were poor again in both the 2014–15 and 2015–16 season, finishing fourteenth on 53 points. What little success the club had during this period was in the 2014–15 season, reaching the semi-final of the FA Trophy.

=== The Gill Era (2017–2024) ===
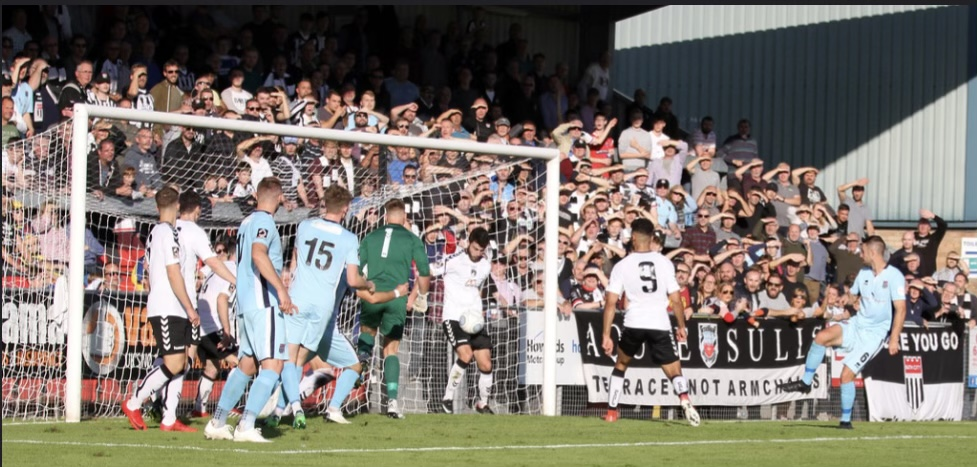
Bath City away at Weston-super-Mare in 2018 in the 4th Round qualifying FA Cup tie.

On 5 October 2017, former player, Jerry Gill, was appointed first team manager. The first season under Gill saw the club finish in ninth. They improved the next season, finishing fifth, on 71 points, subsequently, they entered play offs to compete for a place in the National League, but lost 3–1 to Wealdstone on 1 May 2019, and lost the play offs again the following year against Dorking Wanderers. Average attendances rose, from 612 in 2016–17 to 1,142 in the 2018–19 season. However, Bath were poor in both the 2020–21, and 2021–22 seasons, finishing 18th twice. They improved the following year, finishing 11th and lifting The Somerset Cup for a record 25th time in spring of 2023. In November 2024 Bath City announced that Gill would leave the club.

=== Recent history (2024-) ===
Gill was succeeded as manager by Darren Way. Way was sacked in March 2026 with the club in the relegation zone.

Bath appointed former player Scott Bartlett as their first team coach on 26 March 2026.

== Badge ==
Bath City's initial crest was heavily based on the official coat of arms of the city. The old badge depicted the city's medieval borough wall, the ancient Roman springs, and the sword of Saint Paul. That crest remained until 1975, when it was simplified heavily; all that remained were four vertical black stripes against a white background surrounding the silhouette of a Roman soldier. It was then changed again in 1999, as the badge the club uses today. The Roman soldier was removed, the borough wall re-added, and the four stripes enlarged.

Bath City logo used since 1999

Kit suppliers
Period	Supplier
1976–1985	Adidas
1985–1987	Umbro
1987–1988	Umbro
1988–1989	Umbro
1989–1990	Spall
1990–1992	Umbro
1992–1993	Activity
1993–1997	Vandanel
1997–1998	ICiS
1998–2000	Vandanel
2000–2002	Branded
2002–2003	Branded
2003–2007	Erreà
2007–2008	Sportitalia
2008–2010	Joma
2010–2014	Joma
2014–2015	Jako
2015–2016	Erreà
2016–2017	Erreà
2017–2018	Erreà
2018–2019	Erreà
2019–2020	Bristol Sport
2020–2021	Erreà
2021–2022	Erreà
2022–2023	Erreà
2023–2024	Erreà

Shirt Sponsors
Period	Sponsor
1985–1987	Avon Graphics
1987–1988	Diners
1988–1989	Beazer Homes
1989–1990	Rajani
1990–1992	Design Windows
1992–2000	Bath Chronicle
2000–2002	TechnicCal
2002–2003	Bentley Jennison
2003–2006	Bath Chronicle
2006–2007	John Crick
2007–2008	Tilleys Bistro
2008–2010	SN Scaffolds
2010–2011	Inter Payroll
2011–2014	Moore Stephens
2014–2015	Tilleys Bistro
2015–2016	Midland Car Company
2016–2017	Sitec
2017–2018	Vass of Bath
2018–2019	Bristol Airport
2019–2020	Bristol Airport
2020–2021	Bww
2021–2022	Rocketmakers
2022–2023	Belvoir Castle
2023–2024	Stone King

== Stadiums ==
=== 1889: The North Parade Ground ===
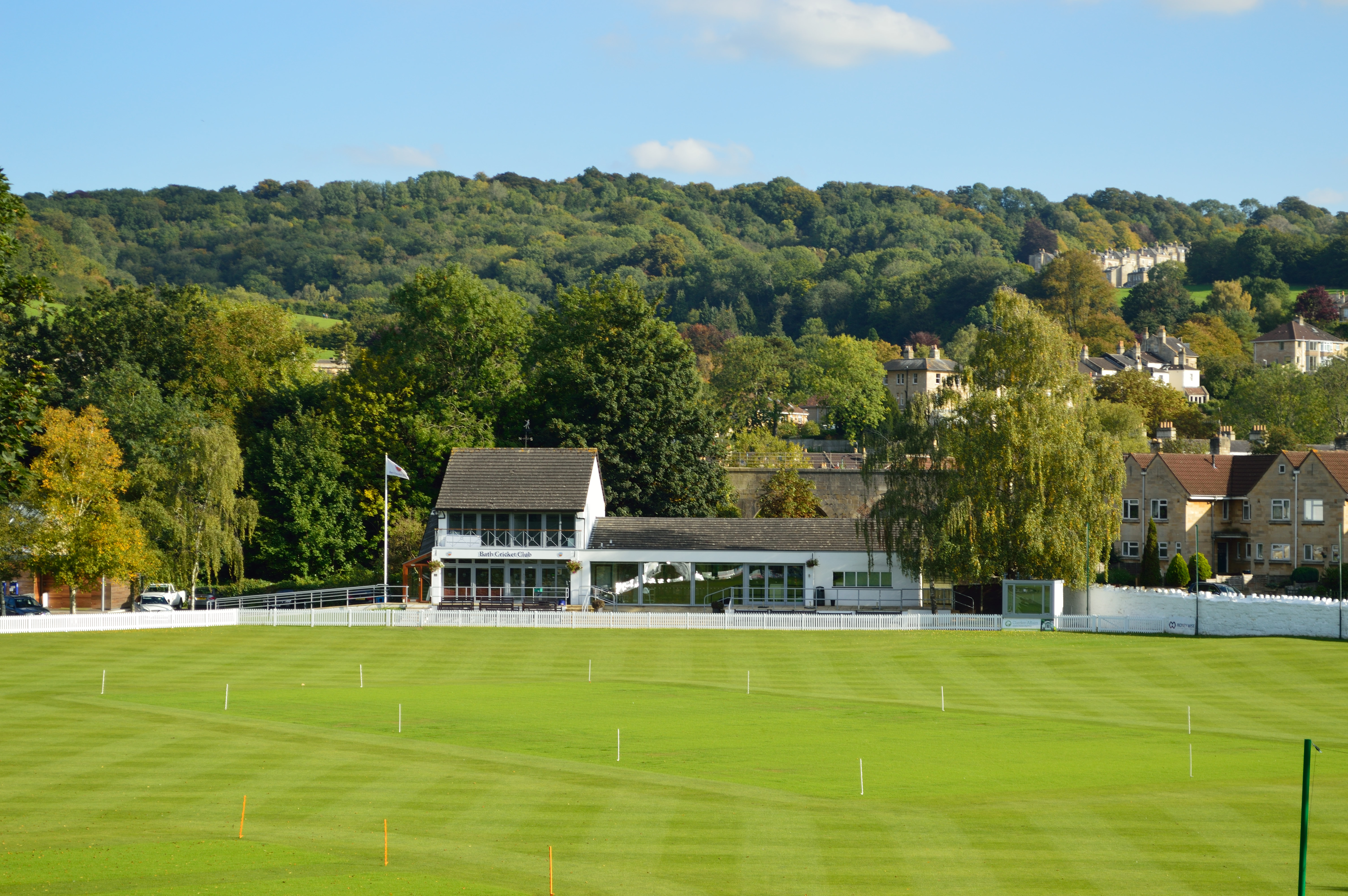
The club's first ever ground, The North Parade Ground

Bath played their most early matches at the North Parade Ground in Bathwick across from the city centre, ground sharing with Bath Cricket Club. In 1889, it mainly hosted friendlies with Bath AFC and other local teams.

=== 1900–1919: Belvoir Castle ===
Bath City settled in Twerton at the Belvoir Castle Ground in 1900. In 1908, there was talk of Bath Rugby sharing the ground, though it never materialised. Two years later, the ground was purchased by the Midland Railway Company by Mr Stothert and Pitt and it was later stated that the ground would be "absolutely unsuitable for football" in a few years time, with the Railway company planning to build a train track on the very land the stadium occupied.

=== 1919–1932: Lambridge ===
Mr Hopkins, the club's secretary at the time, found a viable replacement for Belvoir Castle. In 1919, the club to the east side of the city, in Lambridge. In 1921 the club made an application to join the Football League, in case of success, plenty of work had been done to the ground, with Lambridge's Popular Side being banked and new dressing rooms were built alongside the grandstand.

=== 1932–present: Twerton Park ===
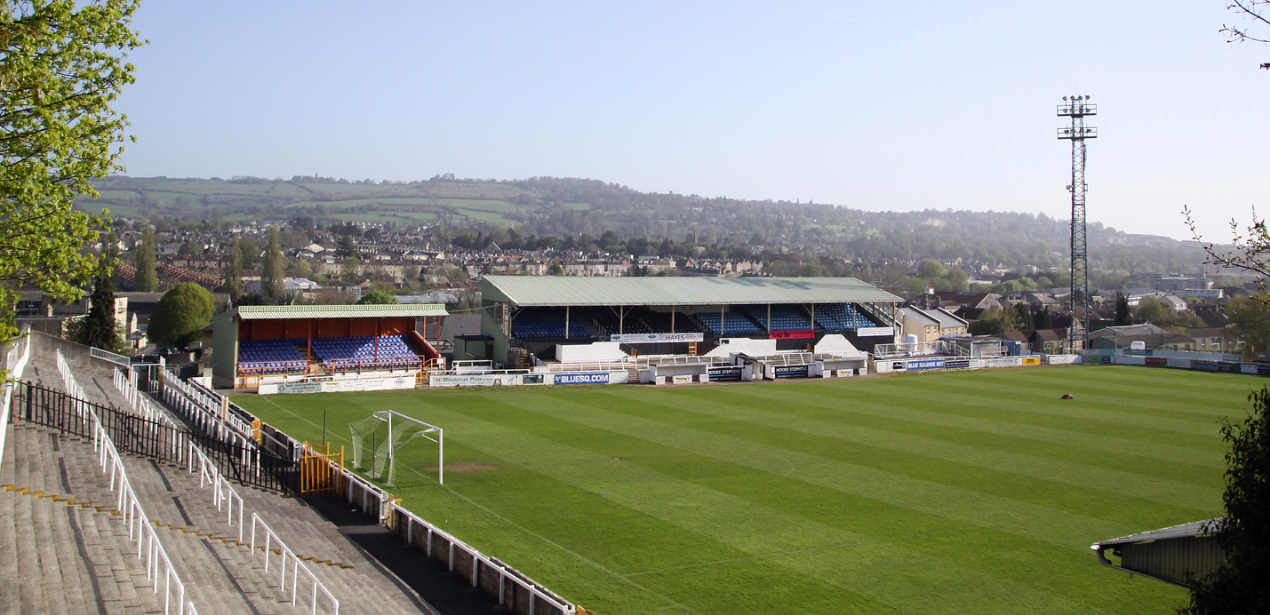
Twerton Park, home of Bath City F.C.

Twerton Park became the club's home ground in 1932 and three years later, roofing was added to The Popular Side. In 1946, Twerton Park was described as "rivaling any stadium in the west of England." A record attendance of 18,020 was recorded in 1960, versus Brighton & Hove Albion in the third round of the FA Cup. Attendances during the 1940s and 1950s were the highest recorded in the club's history, with notable home gates including; 17,000 in 1944 vs Aston Villa, 14,000 vs Southend United in the 1952–53 season and 11,700 against Yeovil Town in 1957.

Between 1986 and 1996, Bath City shared Twerton Park with Bristol Rovers. In 1990 the grandstand was heavily damaged by Bristol City hooligans. The ground currently has a reduced ground capacity of 4,070 from 8,840 because of safety regulations. On 21 August 2008, Bath City held talks with Bath Rugby over a possible ground share at the Rec, though fans were opposed to the move the plans never materialised. Bath City released plans to redevelop the ground in 2017 but in March 2020 the plans were rejected.

== Support ==
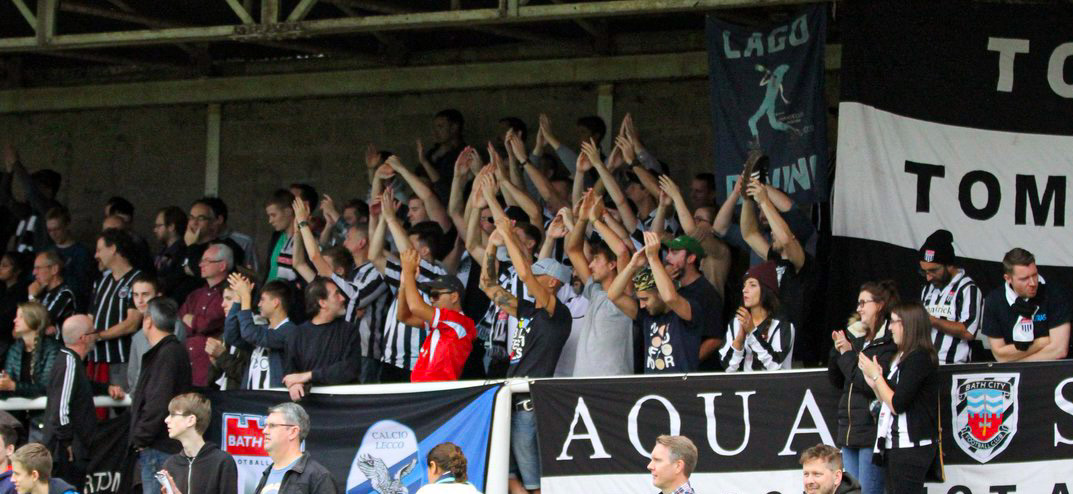
A group of Bath and Calcio Lecco fans on The Popular Side of Twerton Park in 2017

Bath City were well supported in the 1940s, 1950s and 1960s. With gates averaging four to six thousand, and reaching the late ten thousands. However, by the 1970s, attendances had declined to around one thousand two hundred. Gates plummeted further to just the mid hundreds in the 1980s and 1990s, and mid 2010s. As a result, in 2015, a development programme aiming to boost gates to over one thousand was formed, and worked successfully in the later half of the 2010s and early 2020s.

The Popular Side opposite the Grandstand is home to the club's most vocal support. With the core group of singers standing at each end the team are attacking toward, raising large flags. Supporters are known for singing "Drink Up Thy Cider" by The Wurzels, a tribute to the Somerset's cider brewing industry. In 2017, Bath and Alpine Italian side Calcio Lecco fans celebrated the 40th anniversary of the 1977 Anglo-Italian Cup final, with a supporters match held in Lecco's Stadio Rigamonti-Ceppi ground. Bath City have held no fierce rivalries with other clubs over the years, though the club's most contested fixture is shared with fellow Somerset side, Yeovil Town, who they have played 274 times. Since the mid-2000s, Bath have shared a local derby with Wiltshire club, Chippenham Town.

== Records ==
The seasonal League positions of Bath City since joining the English football pyramid in 1979

Bath City's highest ever league finish was fourth in the Alliance Premier League, the fifth level of English football, in the 1984–85 season. The record appearance maker is Dave Mogg, who made 515 appearances in all competitions. Charlie Fleming is the club's all-time top goal scorer, with 216 goals. The highest number of goals scored by a single player in a season was Paul Randall, scoring 51 goals in the 1989–90 season. The highest transfer fee received by the club is £80,000 for Jason Dodd, paid by Southampton in 1989. The highest fee paid by Bath is £16,000 for Micky Tanner signed from Bristol City in 1988. The club's record attendance is 18,020 against Brighton & Hove Albion in the third round of the FA Cup.

== Players ==
=== First-team squad ===
As of 11 October 2026

Note: Flags indicate national team as defined under FIFA eligibility rules; some limited exceptions apply. Players may hold more than one non-FIFA nationality.

No.	Pos.	Nation	Player
1	GK	ENG	Harvey Wiles-Richards
2	DF	ENG	Joe Raynes (vice-captain)
3	DF	WAL	Danny Greenslade
4	DF	ENG	Oliver Tomlinson
5	DF	ENG	Jack Batten
6	DF	ENG	Kieran Parselle (captain)
7	MF	NED	Enzio Boldewijn
8	MF	ENG	James Morton
9	FW	ENG	Scott Wilson
10	MF	POR	Pedro Elawar (on loan from Exeter City)
11	FW	ENG	Owen Windsor
12	MF	ENG	Ollie Chamberlain

No.	Pos.	Nation	Player
14	FW	ENG	Alex Fisher
15	DF	ENG	Harrison Minturn
16	MF	ENG	Jordan Tillson
17	GK	ENG	Dominic Cook
18	FW	ENG	Reuben Reid
19	FW	ENG	Harry Parsons
20	MF	SUI	Matt Bowman
21	MF	ENG	Owen Pritchard
22	MF	ENG	Seweryn Streczen
23	DF	WAL	Callum Wood
25	FW	ENG	Donovan Wilson

== Management ==
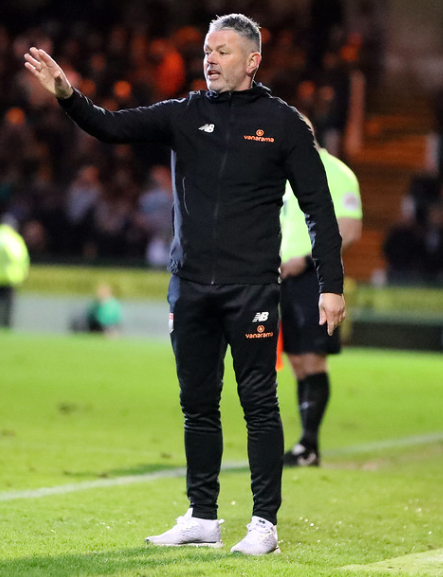
Jerry Gill the club's manager from 2017 to 2024.

=== Coaching ===
Position	Name
Manager	Scott Bartlett
Assistant manager	Richard Joyce
Goalkeeping coach	Martin Horsell
Medical team	Steve Bissix; Sarah Carr
Lead sports scientist	Aaron Hopkinson
First team kit manager	Simon Jenkins
Academy coach	James Moon

=== Board of directors ===
Position	Name
Chairman	David McDonagh
Football chairman	Paul Williams
Directors	Andrew Pierce; Jane Jones; John Reynolds; Dan Smith; David Mathews; Tom Benjamin (interim)
Director of operations	Shane Morgan
Supporter liaison officer	Debbie Norris

=== Managerial history ===
List showing the club's 40 permanent managers from 1907 onwards, caretaker managers are not included

- 1907 (England) Ben Hargett
- 1909 (England) Charles Pinker
- 1921 (England) Billy Tout
- 1925 (England) Charles Pinker
- 1927 (England) Ted Davis
- 1937 (England) Arthur Greaves
- 1938 (Scotland) Alex Raisbeck
- 1940 (England) Ted Davis
- 1945 (England) Arthur Mortimer
- 1947 (England) Vic Woodley
- 1950 (England) Eddie Hapgood
- 1956 (Northern Ireland) Paddy Sloan
- 1957 (England) Bob Hewison
- 1961 (England) Arthur Cole
- 1963 (England) Malcolm Allison
- 1964 (Wales) Ivor Powell
- 1967 (England) Arnold Rodgers
- 1970 (England) Johhny Petts
- 1971 (England) Joe O'Neil
- 1971 (England) Dave Burnside
- 1973 (England) Roy Bence
- 1973 (England) Geoff Fox
- 1973 (England) Bert Head
- 1975 (England) Jack Smith
- 1976 (Wales) Brian Godfrey
- 1979 (England) Micky Burns
- 1979 (England) Bob Boyd
- 1980 (England) Stuart Taylor
- 1982 (England) Bobby Jones
- 1988 (England) Harold Jarman
- 1988 (England) Les Alderman
- 1989 (England) George Rooney
- 1991 (England) Tony Ricketts
- 1996 (England) Steve Millard
- 1998 (Wales) Paul Bodin
- 2001 (England) Alan Pridham
- 2003 (England) Gary Owers
- 2005 (England) John Relish
- 2008 (England) Adie Britton
- 2012 (Australia) Lee Howells
- 2016 (England) Gary Owers
- 2017 (England) Jerry Gill
- 2024 (England) Darren Way

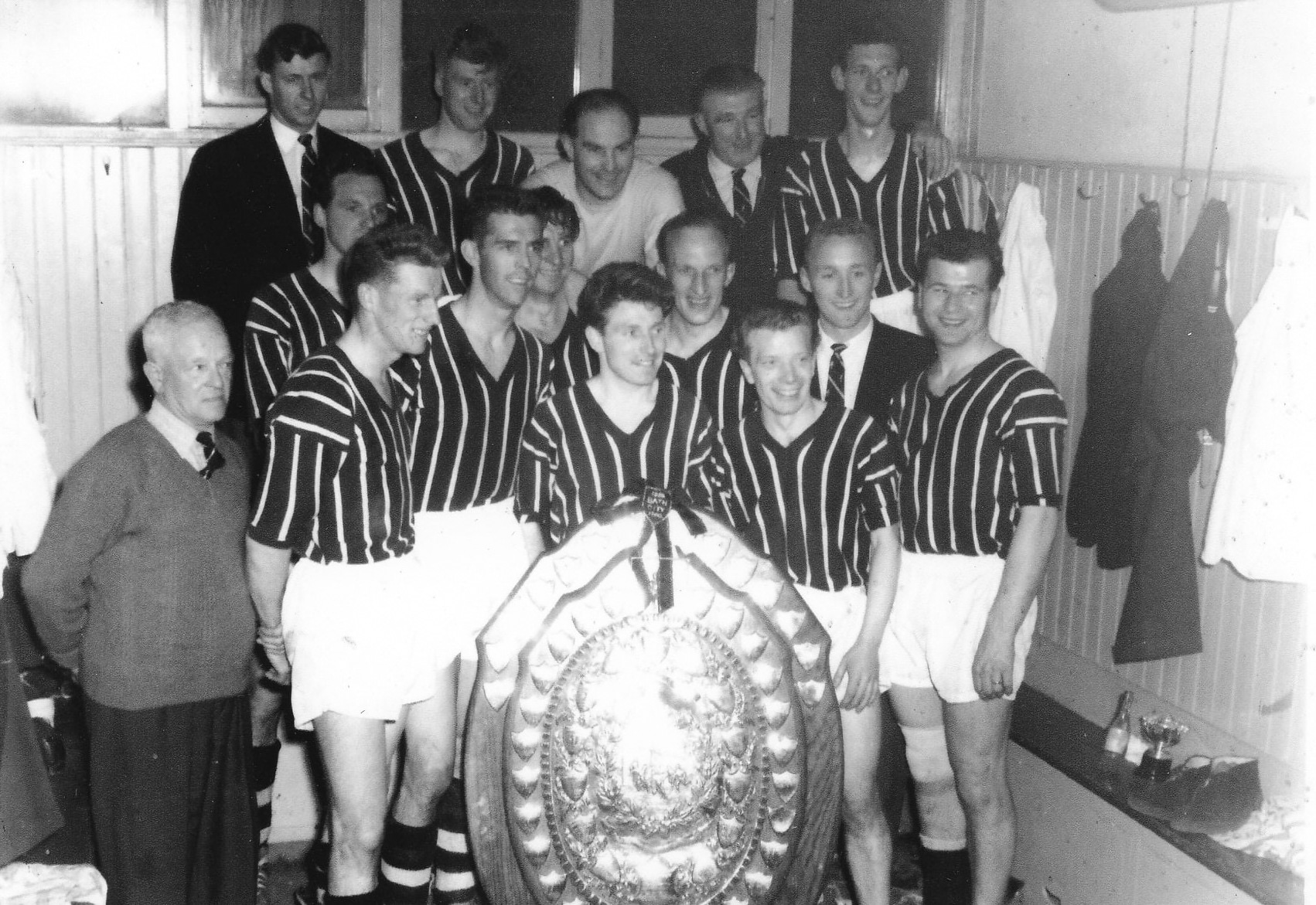
Captain Charlie Fleming (middle centre), former Manchester City player Tony Book (front left,) and former Fulham keeper Ian Black, (back centre) pictured with the Southern League trophy in the Twerton Park changing room in 1960

== Honours ==
- Southern League
  - Champions: 1959–60, 1977–78, 2006–07
- Southern League Cup
  - Winners: 1978–79
