= Jubilee Swimming Pool =

Swimming pool in Bristol

Coordinates: 51.4332°N 2.5623°W

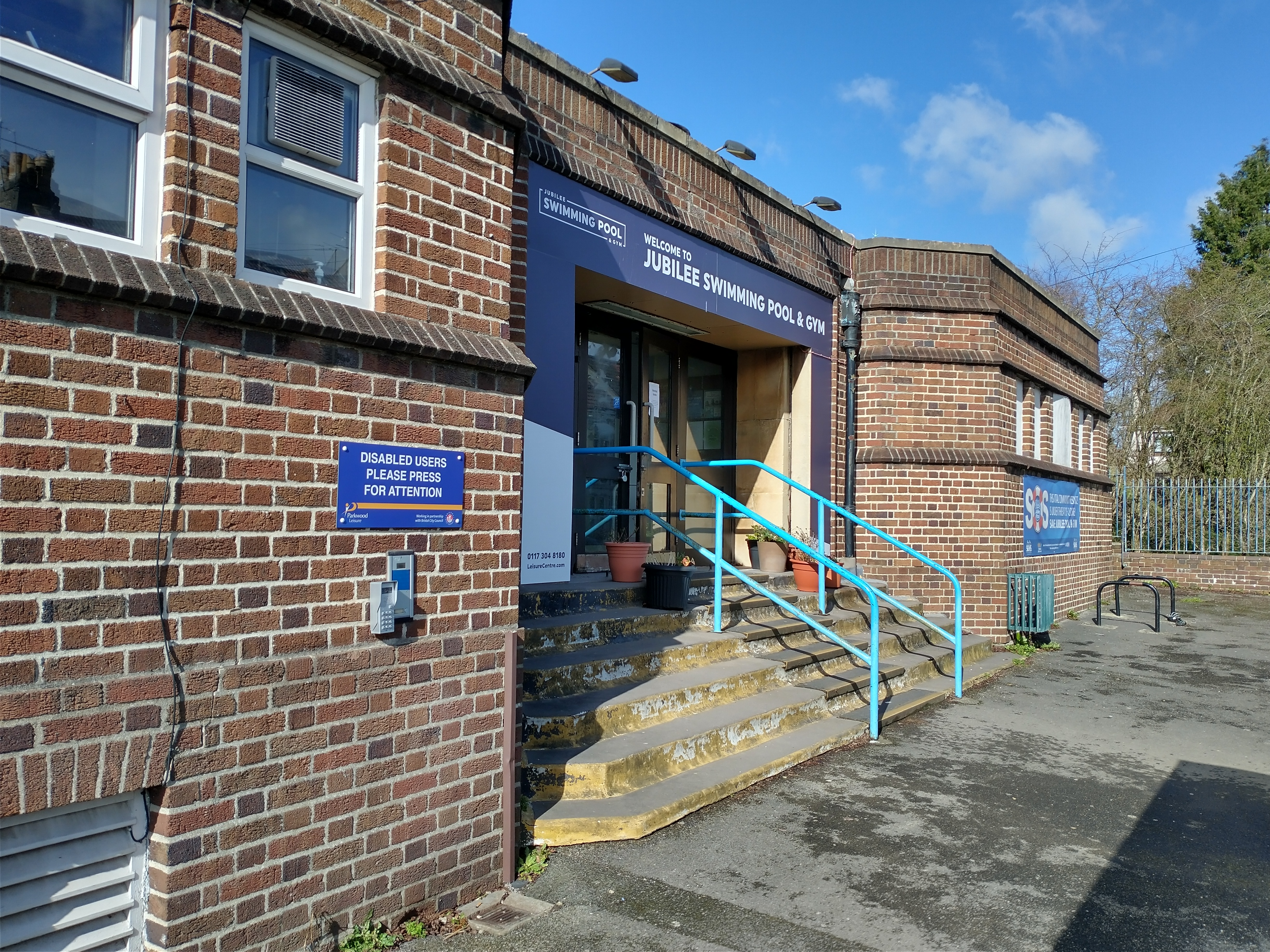
The pool entrance in 2022

Jubilee Swimming Pool is a swimming pool located in Knowle, Bristol, UK.

== History ==
The swimming pool was opened in 1937.

In 2006, Bristol City Council proposed that the pool would close following the completion of Hengrove Park Leisure Centre. In December 2010, Parkwood Leisure took over operation of the pool on behalf of the council. In April 2011, the firm stated that it believed the pool had a viable future and that it could remain open alongside Hengrove Park.

In 2017, the council launched a consultation on its plans to withdraw the £62,000 subsidy required for the pool to operate. Following protest from local residents, the council decided to renew its contract with Parkwood Leisure for another five years. The pool was threatened with closure again in August 2020 when the council launched another consultation.

On 30 September 2022, management of the pool was transferred from the council to the Friends of Jubilee Pool under a 35-year lease. It is the first swimming pool in Bristol to be community owned. It will initially continue to be operated by Parkwood Leisure.
