= Campus Pool =

Skatepark and former swimming pool in Bristol, UK

Coordinates: 51°24′57.24″N 2°37′2.36″W

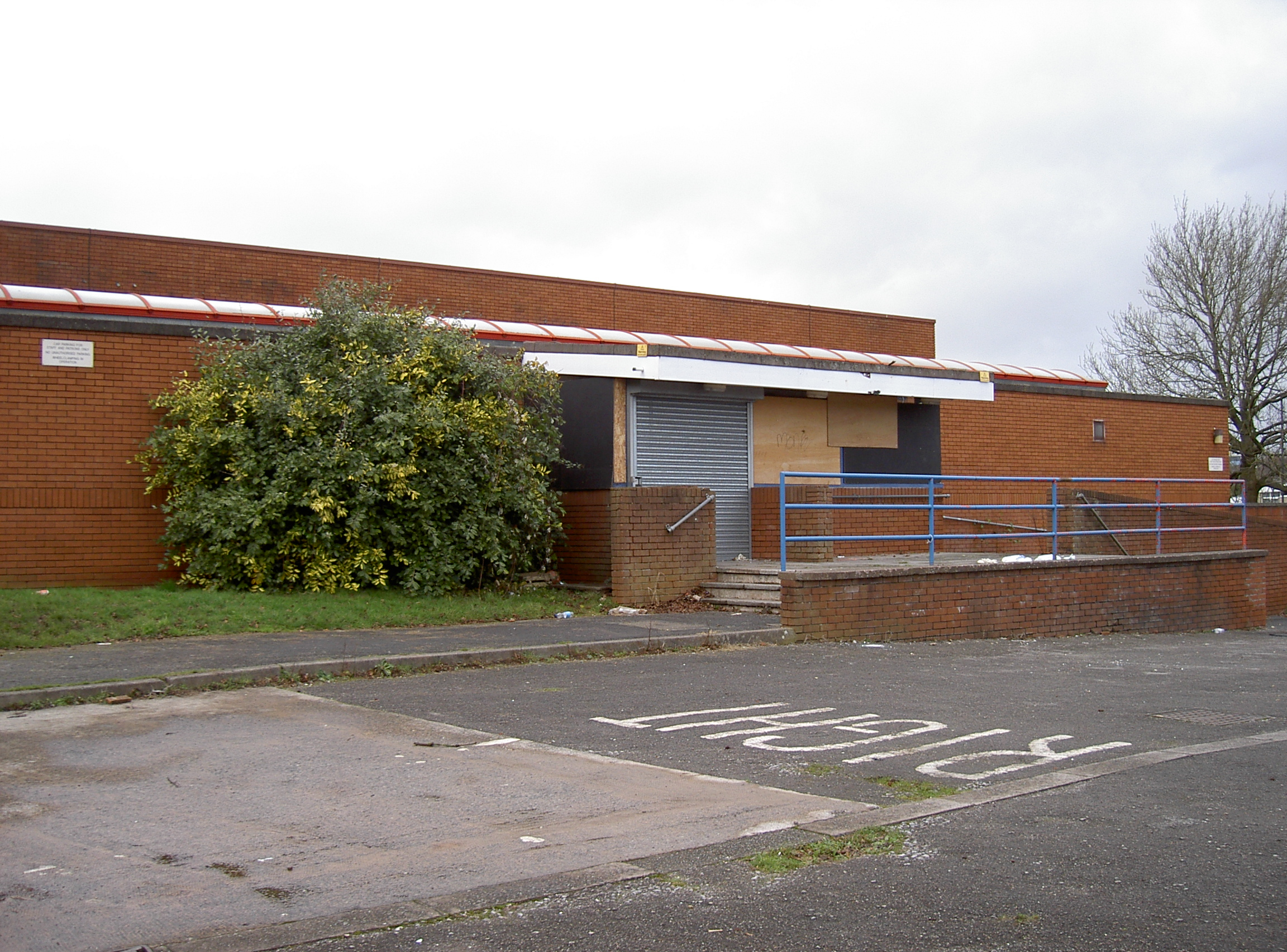
The building before refurbishment.

Campus Pool is a skatepark and former swimming pool in Bishopsworth, Bristol, UK.

== History ==
The former Bishopsworth Swimming Pool closed in 2012, following the opening of Hengrove Park Leisure Centre. In November 2014 it was announced that the building would be reused to house an indoor skatepark. Work to build the skatepark began in March 2015. It opened in July 2015.

== Operation ==
The facility is leased by Bristol City Council rent-free It is operated by Campus Skateparks, a social enterprise.
