= Horfield Leisure Centre =

Leisure centre in Bristol, England

Coordinates: 51°29′37.33″N 2°35′1.7″W

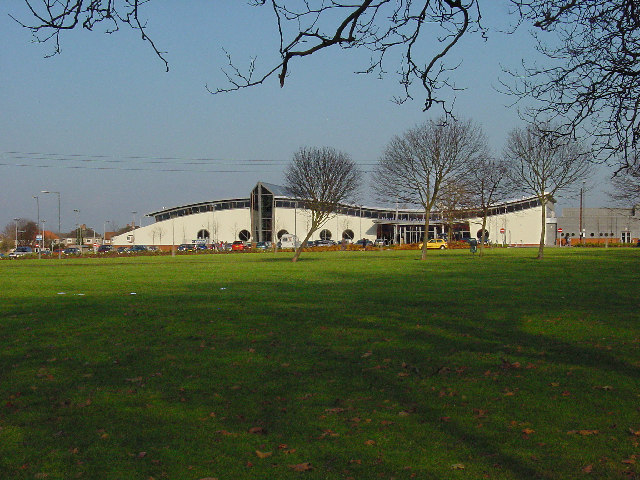
The expanded leisure centre in 2005

Horfield Leisure Centre is a leisure centre in Horfield, Bristol, UK. It is one of the three most used leisure facilities in the Bristol City Council area, the other two being Hengrove Park Leisure Centre and Easton Leisure Centre.

== History ==
Work began to expand the facility in 2003. As part of the expansion, a swimming pool, fitness suite, creche, and cafe were added. The facility reopened on 14 November 2005 with an official opening by Darren Campbell on 18 November.

In July 2016, the centre reopened following a refurbishment. In December 2016, artificial turf pitches were opened at the site.
