= List of football clubs in Somerset =

This is a list of football teams based in the English county of Somerset. The teams are sorted by which domestic league they compete in. Currently, there are no football clubs based in Somerset which participate in the English Football League. Yeovil Town is the club situated in the highest division, which competes in the National League, (fifth tier). The most notable historic derby within the county is the Somerset derby between Yeovil and Bath. The leagues are listed in order of their level in the English football league system. The list only features teams from the 6th to the 10th tier of the system.

Locations of some of the Football clubs in Somerset from levels 1–10.

== Levels 5–6 ==
These clubs compete in National League, comprising the sixth and fifth tier of the English football league system.

Club	Home Ground	Capacity	Location	League	Level	ref.
Yeovil Town	Huish Park	9,656	Yeovil	National League	5	
Bath City	Twerton Park	8,840	Bath	National League South	6	
Weston-super-Mare	Woodspring	3,500	Weston-super-Mare	National League South	6	

== Levels 7–10 ==
Club	Home Ground	Capacity	Location	League	Level	ref.
Taunton Town	Wordsworth Drive	3,000	Taunton	National League South	7	
Larkhall Athletic	Plain Ham	1,000	Bath	Southern League Division 1	8	
Clevedon Town	Hand Stadium	3,500	Clevedon	Western League Premier	9	
Bridgwater United	Fairfax Park	2,500	Bridgwater	Western League Premier	9	
Wellington	The Playing Field	1,500	Wellington	Western League Premier	9	
Keynsham Town	Crown Fields	3,000	Keynsham	Western League Premier	9	
Welton Rovers	West Clewes	2,400	Midsomer Norton	Western League Premier	9	
Shepton Mallet	The Playing Fields	2,500	Shepton Mallet	Western League Premier	9	
Ashton & Backwell United	Recreation Ground	1,000	Backwell	Western League Premier	9	
Street	The Tannery Ground	1,500	Street	Western League Premier	9	
Wells City	Athletic Ground	1,500	Wells	Western League Division 1	10	
Portishead Town	Bristol Road	1,000	Portishead	Western League Division 1	10	
Odd Down	Lew Hill Memorial	1,000	Bath	Western League Division 1	10	
Nailsea & Tickenham	Fryth Way	1,000	Nailsea	Western League Division 1	10	
Bishops Lydeard	Darby Way	1,000	Bishops Lydeard	Western League Division 1	10	
Radstock Town	Southfields	1,000	Radstock	Western League Division 1	10	
Cheddar	Bowdens Park	1,100	Cheddar	Western League Division 1	10	
Wincanton Town	Wincanton Sports Ground	1,000	Wincanton	Western League Division 1	10	
