= Robert de Berkeley, 3rd feudal baron of Berkeley =

Anglo-Norman baron and justice (died 1220)

Sir Robert de Berkeley, 3rd feudal baron of Berkeley (died 1220) was an Anglo-Norman baron and justice.

== Life ==
The eldest of the six sons of Maurice de Berkeley, on his father's death in 1190 he paid to the king Richard I of England a fine of £1,000, for livery of his inheritance; and to John of England in 1199 60 marks for confirmation of his title and a charter of fairs in his manor of Berkeley.

At the time of the Fourth Crusade, King John in 1202 requested that Pope Innocent III absolve certain of his knights who had taken vows from serving as crusaders, for the sake of defending his realm, and Robert was one of them. In 1208 Robert was a justiciar at Derby. By 1213, with John bringing heavy financial pressure to bear, Robert made a deal under which some of his debt was forgiven for the services of ten knights during one year.

Robert took a leading part in the struggle between King John and the barons. He was included in the excommunication of the barons pronounced by Innocent III, and Berkeley Castle and its lands were seized. In 1216, however, shortly before John died, he visited the king, then at Berkeley Castle, under a safe-conduct, and made his submission. The manor of Cam, Gloucestershire was then granted to him for the support of his wife Juliana, niece of William Marshal, 1st Earl of Pembroke.

In 1216, on the accession of Henry III of England, Robert was restored to his lands, on payment of a fine, with the exception of the castle and lands of Berkeley.

== Death ==
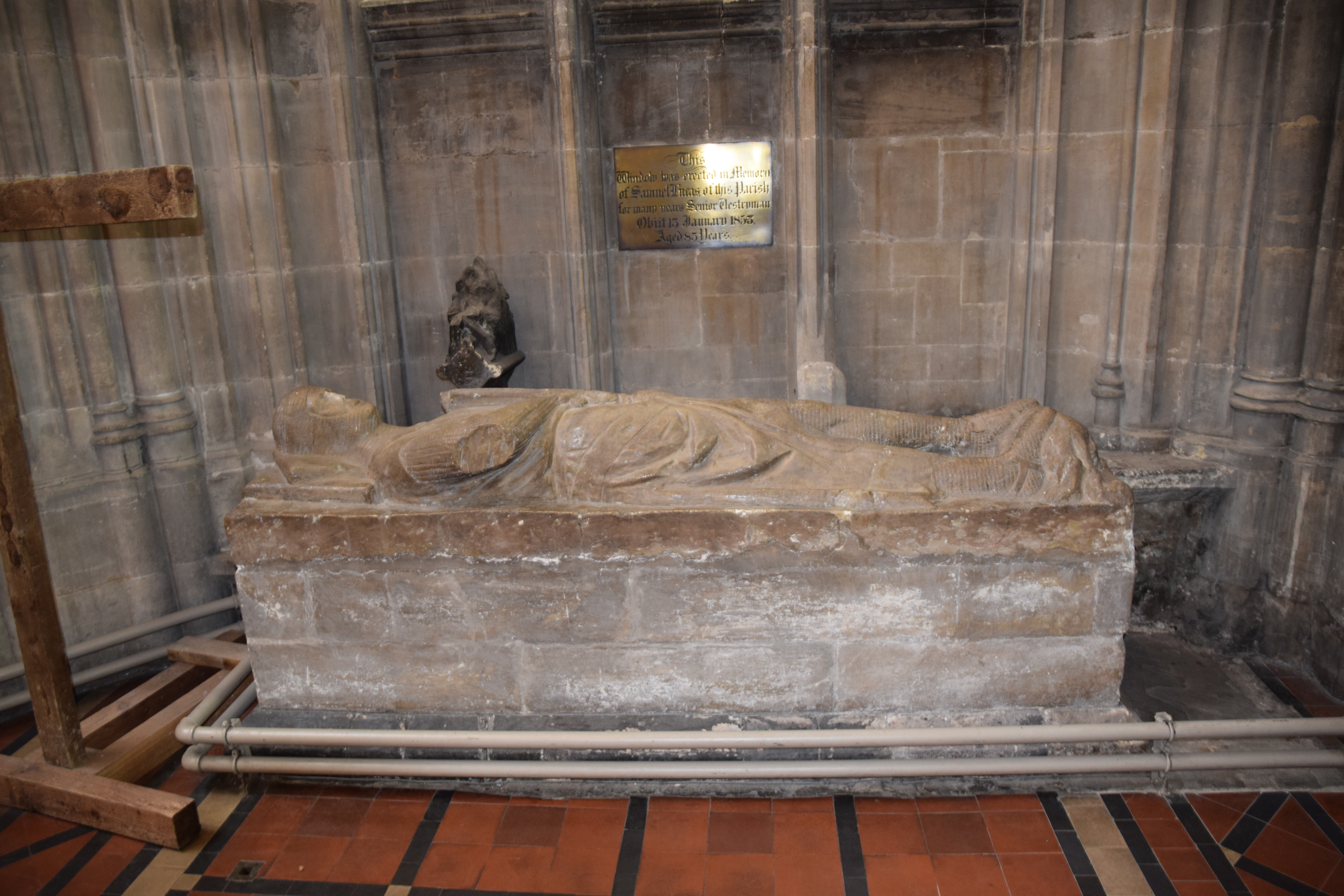
Robert de Berkeley, chest tomb in St Mary Redcliffe

Robert de Berkeley died in 1219, still dispossessed of Berkeley Castle. He was buried in a monk's cowl in the north aisle of St Augustine's Abbey, Bristol. He has a chest tomb in St Mary Redcliffe.

== Legacy ==
Robert was a benefactor of St Augustine's Abbey, Burdenstoke in Wiltshire, Stanley Priory in Gloucestershire, and the canons of Hereford. He founded St Catherine's Hospital, Bedminster, near Bristol, as an Austin priory for a warden and poor brethren and two chantries elsewhere.

About 1190 Robert made a gift of a well and conduit to the community of Redcliffe: see St Mary Redcliffe Pipe Walk.

== Family ==
After the death of his first wife Juliana, Robert married Lucia (whose family is not known), later wife to Hugh de Gurney. He left no issue by either wife, and was succeeded by his brother Thomas, to whom Berkeley Castle was restored.

William Longespée, 3rd Earl of Salisbury occupied the castle after Robert's death, however, claiming that the widowed Lucia was his niece, and pregnant. Robert had owed him money. He aimed, also, at wardship of an heir. William Marshal, 2nd Earl of Pembroke objected. Hubert de Burgh ordered Ralph Musard as Sheriff to take possession: Musard had been a household knight of the late 1st Earl of Pembroke. Thomas de Berkeley was married, as his brother had been, to a daughter of a sister of the 1st Earl of Pembroke.

The matter was resolved by de Burgh, under terms by which the Earl of Salisbury gave up the castle to the king. Thomas took possession of it in 1224.
