= Easton Leisure Centre =

Leisure centre in Bristol, England

Coordinates: 51°27′35.04″N 2°34′26.04″W

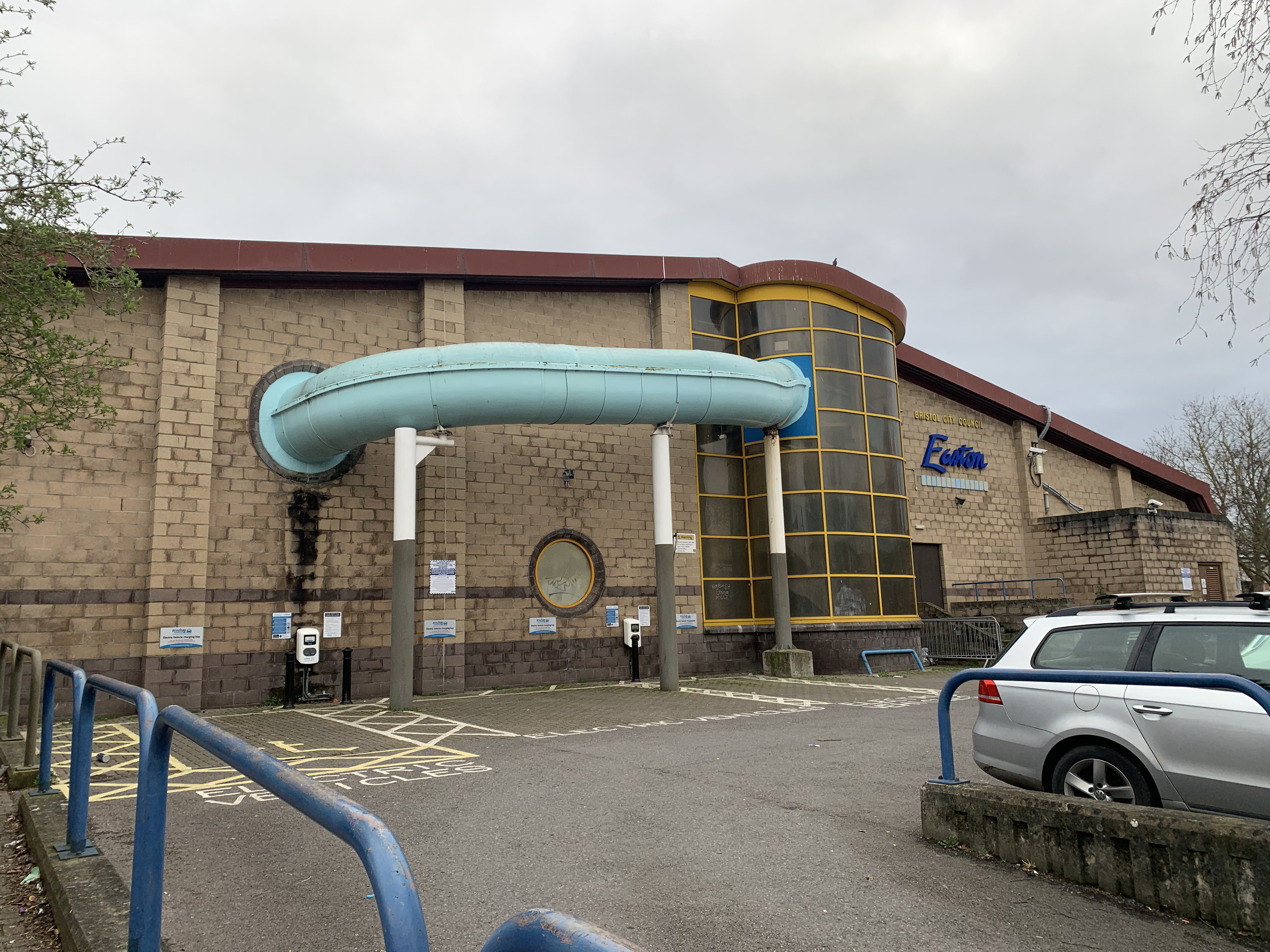
Exterior of Easton Leisure Centre

Easton Leisure Centre is a leisure centre in Easton, Bristol, UK. It contains a gym and swimming pool. It is one of the three most used leisure facilities in the Bristol City Council area, the other two being Hengrove Park Leisure Centre and Horfield Leisure Centre. It is operated by Everyone Active on behalf of the Council.

In May 2022, a solar-based heating system was installed to supplement the existing gas heating. During daytimes in the summer, the pool was able to rely entirely on solar energy for its heating.

The centre underwent a £3.8 million refurbishment in 2025, expanding existing facilities and adding a women-only gym.

== Facilities ==
The main pool in the centre is 25 metres (82 feet) by 13 metres (43 feet). There is also a water slide.
