= St Mary Redcliffe Pipe Walk =

Annual tradition

St Mary Redcliffe Pipe Walk is an annual tradition which sees participants follow the route of a conduit that runs from a water source in the Knowle area of Bristol to the church of St Mary Redcliffe, a distance of approximately 2 miles. New participants on the walk are traditionally 'bumped' on marker stones that record the route of the pipe. The tradition of the walk may date back to 1190 when Robert de Berkeley donated the water to the people of the parish. It has been called "the oldest observed custom of its kind".

== History ==
The church of St Mary Redcliffe is a Grade I listed building, and although the earliest surviving fabric of the building dates back to the late 12th century, it is likely that these has been a church on the site since Saxon times. The area of Redcliffe is now part of the city of Bristol, however historically it was outside the city boundaries and a strong local rivalry developed between inhabitants of the two areas. Despite their close geographical locations the relatively deep River Avon, Bristol, now part of Bristol Harbour, historically separated the two.

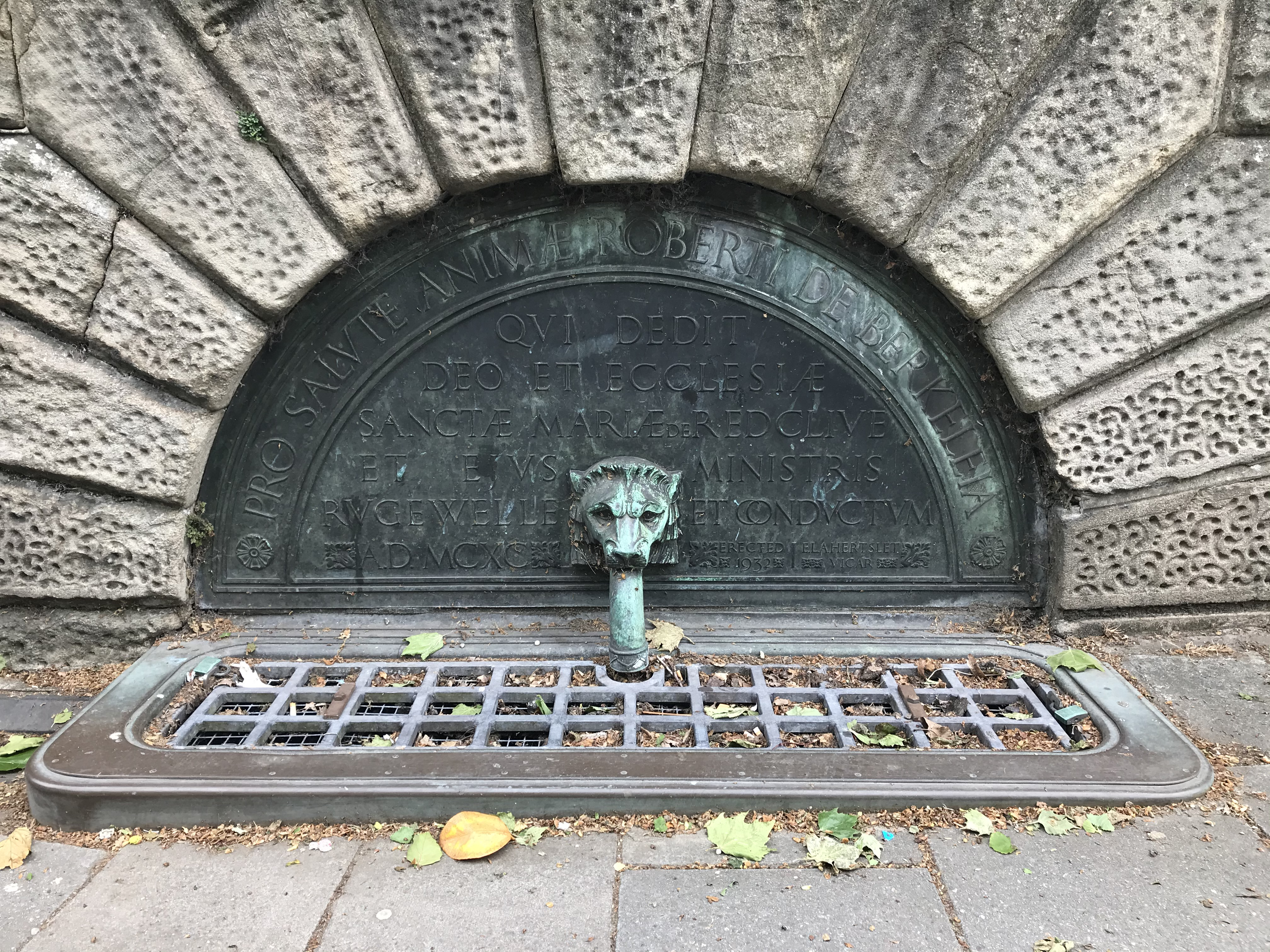
St Mary Redcliffe, Bristol - brass drinking fountain with inscription

Redcliffe was historically part of the manor of Bedminster, Bristol which was held by the Earls of Gloucester. However, Robert Fitzharding, the first feudal baron of Berkeley, Gloucestershire was able to purchase the land from Robert, 1st Earl of Gloucester some time before his death in 1170. His descendant is named on a brass drinking fountain (installed in 1932) set into the south end of a wall that runs along Redcliffe Hill as the person who gave the water and conduit to the parish. The translated inscription reads -

“For the health of the soul of Robert de Berkeley, who gave to God and the church of St. Mary Redcliffe and its ministers the Rugewell and conduit. AD 1190 Erected 1932. ELA Hertslet Vicar.”

It is unclear when the tradition started but the present day walk follows the original route of the pipe in order to check for damage. The pipe may originally have been wooden, before being made of lead, and finally being replaced by a metal pipe at an unknown time When the New Cut, Bristol was constructed between 1804 and 1809 the pipe was diverted to cross the cut via Bedminster Bridge.

The present pipe runs under a railway line, and it is believed that in the early 20th century any group surveying the pipe had the power to stop trains to allow them to cross.

A newspaper article from December 1928 records that at that time the water from the pipe was not suitable for drinking -

"It regrettable to know that the old water supply has fallen on evil times. The fountain on the hill has ceased to provide thirsty travellers with a cool drink. Exactly what happens to the water no one seems to know. It still flows from the spring, we believe; its course through the old leaden pipes is still unimpeded, but somewhere, somehow its purity has become contaminated. The blame has been laid on the allotment holders; it has quite naturally been stoutly denied by these residents of Knowle, and business people under the shadow of the old church have been given the responsibility for closing down a supply which had been used for drinking purposes for 700 years."

The pipe was damaged by a bomb in World War II. The present day pipe is believed to end in Spring Street.

== Revival ==
It is not known for certain when the old tradition stopped, however it has been speculated that it was World War I that lead to this break.

On Wednesday 5 December 1928 an article appeared in the 'Local Notes and News' section of the Western Daily Press, which quoted the following from on an article in the 'Redcliffe Parish Magazine' for December - "The editor, being something of upstart, and not before encountered this important piece of parochial observance, nor having heard it named, has somewhat irreverently given it a title reminiscent of the Cake Walk. By that he means no dishonour, for he is deeply conscious of the propriety and necessity of keeping up these old traditions. He begs to announce, therefor, that the Parish will walk the pipe— or rather, since that suggests walking the plank—will trace the pipe on December 8th. The origin of this custom is known all. By charter of the reign of John. Redcliff was given the water which flows from a certain spring at Knowle in order to maintain our just rights over the land through which runs the pipe which conveys this water, it necessary that from time to time we ' trace ' the pipe." This quote suggests that the custom was not that well known, as the editor of the parish magazine had not previously heard of it, and may point to the fact that the title dates to this time.

The unknown author of the article also then goes onto report on previous walks, which they remembered from their childhood - "One's memory goes back to a time when this was an annual Redcliff custom. It involved a good walk, a good lunch, and a game of rounders, which was a sore tax on the staying powers of stout members of the vestry."

An article from the Weston Daily Press on Monday 10 December reports on the walk that occurred on Saturday 8 December -"Ancient tradition was upheld Saturday afternoon when the clergy, vestrymen, and parish official of St. Mary Redcliff, together with a number and parishioners others 'walked the pipe' accordance with old time custom". The article goes onto to report that the walk began at the Parish Hall on Guinea Street and followed the route of the pipe to its source. The walk crossed Bedminster Bridge and then moved into Victoria Park, Bristol "where the first marking stone was reached, and on which appropriately enough, the new vicar was the first to be 'bumped'...and at the various stones en route, which were pointed out by the guides, one or other of the party made similar acquaintance with these parish land marks." The article records that the marker stones were engraved with "R.P", and that the route was preserved even "underneath the boundary wall and railings [of Victoria Park], and provision has been made for the iron bars to be unscrewed. This was not done on Saturday, but the Vicar announced that the formality would be complied with future occasions". Rights of way along the route closer to the source "has been protected by the erection of hedges".

The article ends be recording "In olden days, according to the records, the end of the walk marked the commencement of much jollification, including feasting, while the athletic prowess of the "walkers" was tested with a game of rounders. In lieu of this out-of-date dissipation, om Saturday the company enjoyed a very acceptable cup of tea in the Athletic Association's pavilion, and watched the younger parishioners indulging in a game Rugby football."

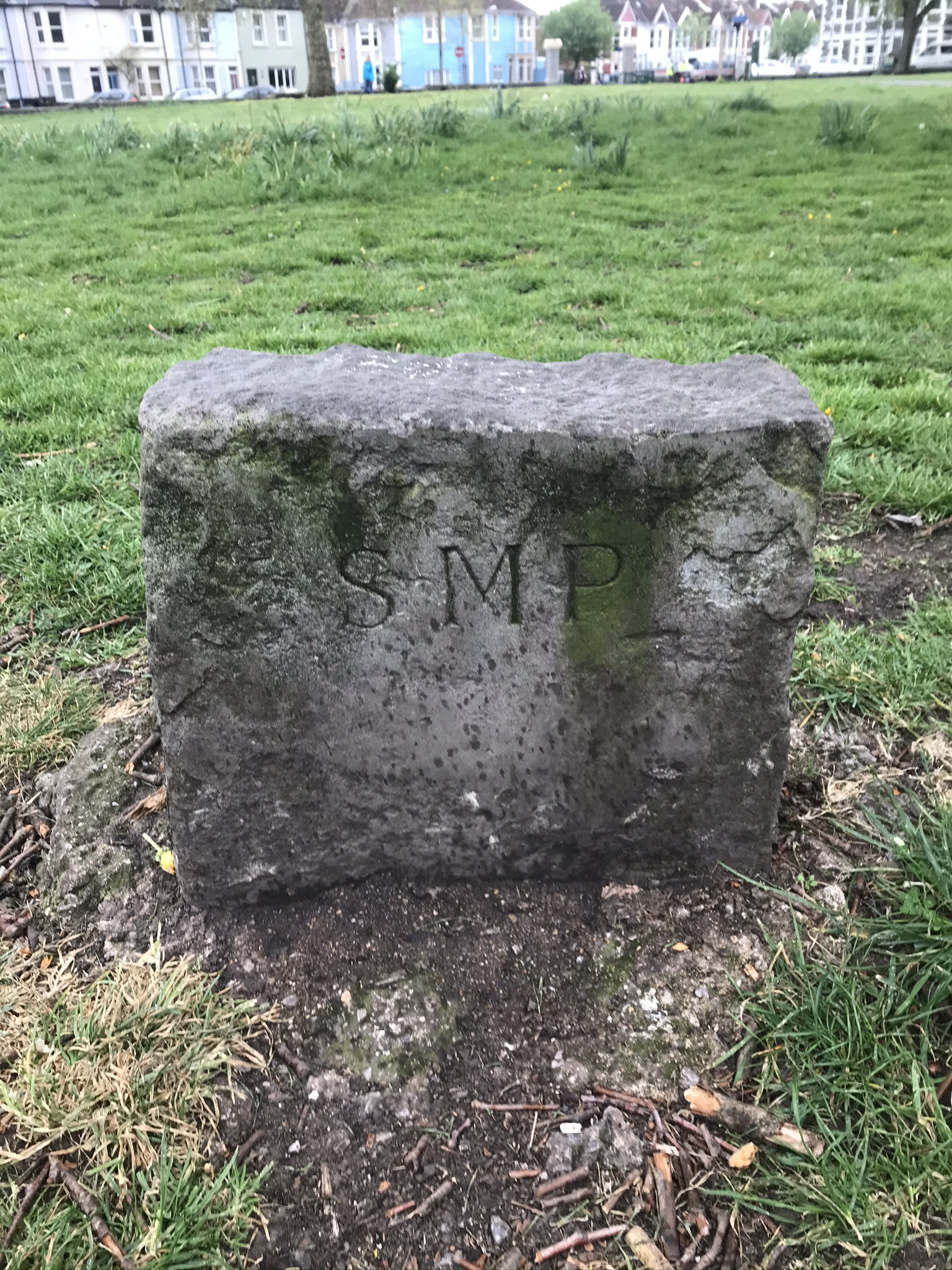

== Present day ==
Today the walk occurs on a Saturday in late October each year. Walkers meet at St Barnabas’ Church in Knowle, before following the route of the pipe to St Mary Redcliffe, in an apparent reversal of the custom from previous years.

The route takes participants through several private gardens, and the pipe can be inspected at a number of points, via manhole covers. There are several stone markers along the route, inscribed with 'SMP', which is apparently different from that which was recorded in 1928, which could suggest the stones have been replaced or re engraved since then. New participants continue to be 'bumped' on one of these stones in the park.

There is a water maze in the park, installed by Wessex Water in 1984, whose design is based upon a carved boss in St Mary Redcliffe Church. Inscriptions around the maze record the history of the donation of the pipe.
