= Knowle, Bristol =

Neighbourhood of Bristol, England

Coordinates: 51°26′02″N 2°34′20″W

Knowle
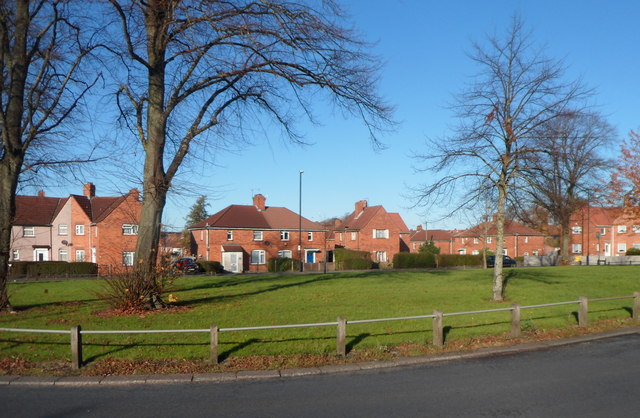
- Inter-war semi-detached houses on Broad Walk, Knowle

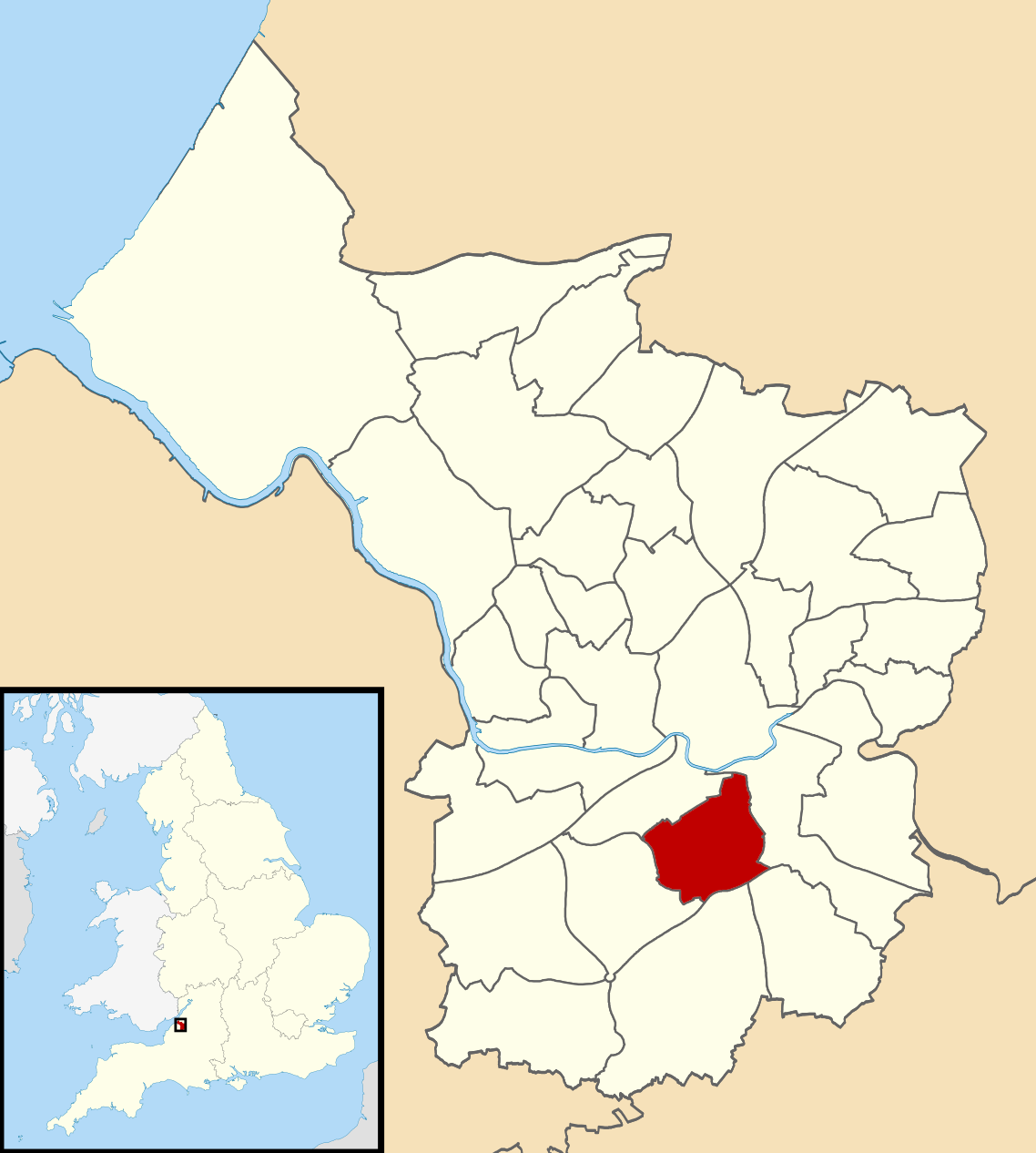
- Boundaries of the city council ward since 2016
- Population: 11,315 (2011.Ward)
- OS grid reference: ST603707
- Unitary authority: Bristol
- Ceremonial county: Bristol
- Region: South West
- Country: England
- Sovereign state: United Kingdom
- Post town: BRISTOL
- Postcode district: BS4
- Dialling code: 0117
- Police: Avon and Somerset
- Fire: Avon
- Ambulance: South Western
- UK Parliament: Bristol East

Knowle is a district and council ward in southeast Bristol, England, lying on the broad ridge of the Wells Road about 2 mi (3 km) from the city centre. It is bordered by Filwood Park to the west, Brislington to the east, Whitchurch and Hengrove to the south and Totterdown to the north. The area's name, recorded as Canole in the Domesday Book of 1086, is derived from the Old English cnoll (a small rounded hill or hillock), a reflection of the terrain which falls away northwards to the River Avon.

Historically the label Knowle embraced several distinct settlements. Lower Knowle grew up around the medieval demesne of Lower Knowle Farm on the slopes above Bedminster; Upper Knowle developed later along Wells Road, while the large housing estate around Inns Court and Filwood became popularly known as Knowle West.

== History ==
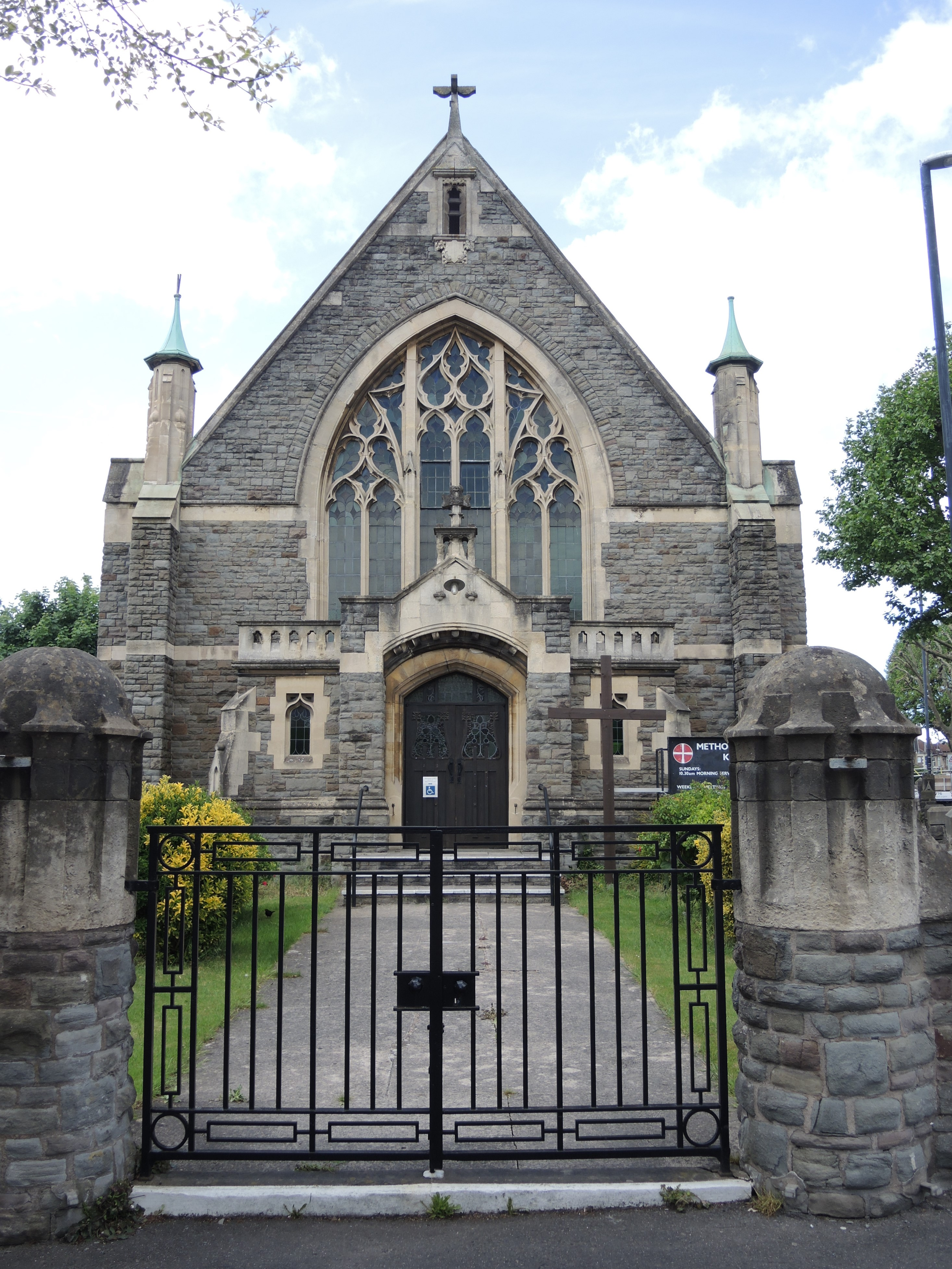
Knowle Methodist Church, located on the corner of Redcatch Road and Wells Road

Knowle, at the time of its recording in the Domesday Book, was an outlying member of the vast royal manor of Bedminster. Historically, Lower Knowle supplied part of central Bristol’s water: a spring on the hillside fed Redcliff conduit via a lead pipe first laid in the 13th century. Archaeological analysis of Lower Knowle Farm has shown continuous occupation from at least the sixteenth century, and suggests that the now-demolished Lower Knowle Court stood on or near the site of the original high-status medieval house, complete with manorial fishponds.

In 1887 the Bristol Corporation approved a £45,000 sewerage scheme for Upper Knowle, Brislington and Malago Vale, bringing main drainage to many of the hillside cottages. Two years later the Bristol Tramways Company sought parliamentary powers to extend its horsecar line from Totterdown up to Knowle, signalling the suburb's emergence as a commuter district. Electric trams reached the top of Wells Road in 1904 and remained the routine way into central Bristol until 1941, when the last unit was withdrawn.

An industrial home for girls was built off Wells Road in 1891–92, recorded as housing 50 trainees and a laundry intended to give paid work to poorer Knowle women. In 1913 the city opened the Knowle Open Air School for frail children in Upper Knowle, aiming to restore them to health through lessons taken outdoors and a specially subsidised diet.

After World War I, Knowle became one of Bristol's principal estates under the 1919 Housing and Town Planning Act. The city's architects laid out garden-suburb streets at Knowle Park, one of four standardised showcase estates alongside Hillfields, Sea Mills and Shirehampton. Subsidised Wheatley Act housing of the later 1920s increased densities, and in the 1930s slum-clearance families from inner Bristol were rehoused in the southern fields now called Knowle West, formally part of Filwood ward but historically linked to Knowle. The Gaiety Cinema opened 1935 with capacity for around 800 people and featured a Moorish interior complete with wall-paintings of galleons and an under-floor hot-air heating system said to copy Roman practice.

Following World War II, demolition of structures in the area began to make way for new housing. This included Knowle House, an 18th-century villa on Talbot Road, which was demolished in 1949 despite protests. Rapid population growth after World War II triggered the construction of new primary schools, branch libraries, and the modernist Broadwalk Shopping Centre which opened in 1974. Built at a cost of £4 million, the shopping centre was hailed by councillor Gladys Sprackling as "a social centre where you meet all your friends".

Broadwalk later struggled to compete with larger retail parks in the area and by the 2020s had fewer than half of its units occupied. Plans approved in principle in 2023, marketed as Redcatch Quarter, would replace the complex with mixed-use blocks of up to twelve storeys, 820 flats and a new cinema and library.. Following community input in 2025, the plans for the number of homes were scaled back to approximately 500, and the maximum height of the new buildings on the western part of the site was reduced from twelve to three storeys.

== Amenities and culture ==
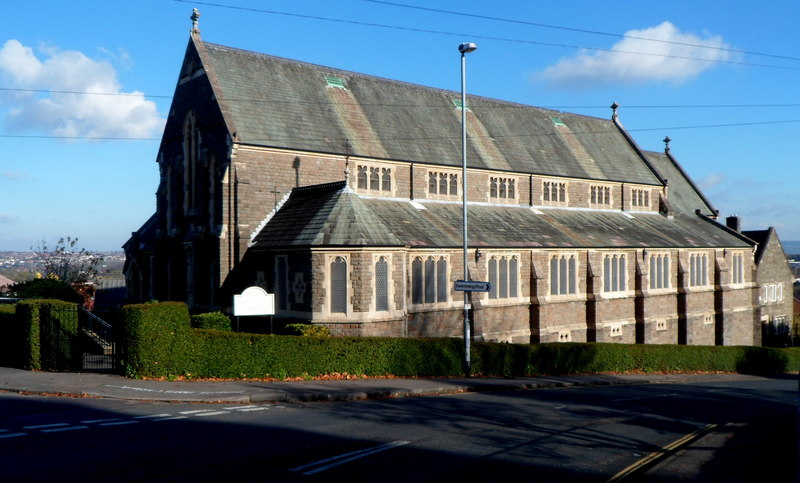
Roman Catholic Church of St Gerard Majella, Knowle

Knowle's principal open space is Redcatch Park, a 1930s recreation ground with football pitches, a community orchard and croquet lawns. Immediately north stands Jubilee Swimming Pool, one of only two surviving 1930s neighbourhood baths built by Bristol Corporation; rescued from closure in 2022, it is now run by volunteers and records around 100,000 swims a year.

Knowle is also home to a large number of churches, which include the Perpendicular-style Roman Catholic Church of St Gerard Majella, built in 1909 and designed by Pugin & Pugin, the octagonal Knowle Methodist Church (1852, Grade II); and the Church of the Holy Nativity (J.C. Neale, 1883), whose tower is also listed. The mid-century Bedminster Quaker Meeting House occupies a landscaped garden on Wedmore Vale.

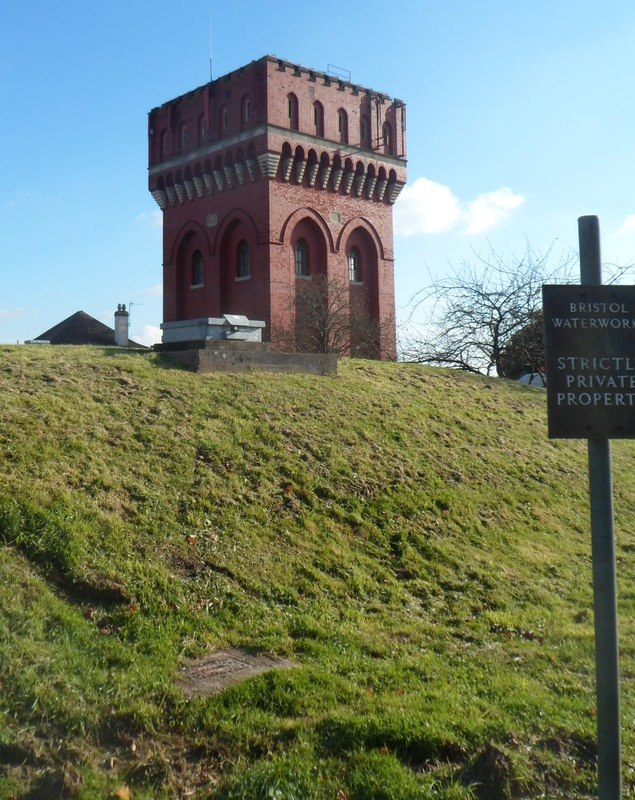
The water tower for Knowle Reservoir

== Infrastructure ==
The suburb is traversed by the A37, which remains the main bus corridor into central Bristol. Bristol Tramways' horse trams reached the area in 1872 and electric cars climbed the gradient after 1900, although the service was abandoned with the closure of the city tramways in 1941. Bristol's 19th century sanitary engineers laid combined sewers deep beneath Upper Knowle, replacing the earlier open drains described as "ruinous and dangerous" by contemporaries. Bristol Waterworks later erected the Knowle Water Tower in 1905, which is now Grade II listed.

Housing development evolved in phases: low-density Addison Act cottages with parlours and gardens at Knowle Park (1920–24); higher-density Wheatley Act semi-detached houses during the late 1920s and post-war infill of timber-framed Cornish Units. Current proposals for Redcatch Quarter envisage district heating, new pedestrian streets and realigned bus stops.

== See also ==
- Knowle West
