= Hengrove Park Leisure Centre =

Sports centre in Bristol, England

Coordinates: 51.4135°N 2.5848°W

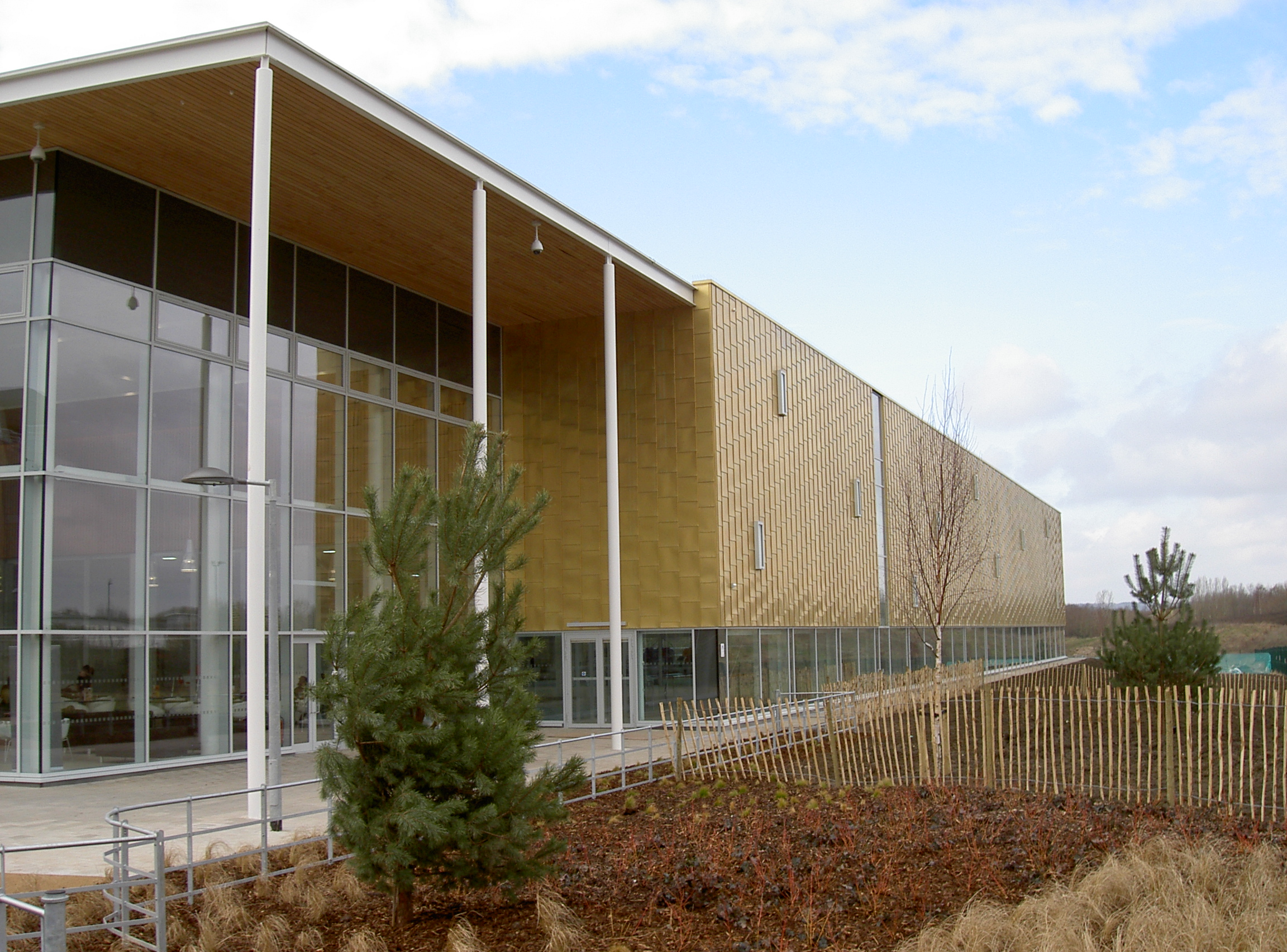

Hengrove Park Leisure Centre is a leisure centre in Hengrove, Bristol, UK.

The project was funded through a private finance initiative (PFI) and cost £35 million. It was built on part of the site of Whitchurch Airport. The centre is operated by Parkwood Leisure for Bristol City Council.

== History ==
Plans to build the centre were announced in 2006. It opened on 29 February 2012. Bishopsworth Swimming Pool was subsequently closed.

In October 2020, work began to refurbish the gym. The project was completed in April 2021.

== Facilities ==
The centre includes a 10-lane 50-metre Olympic-size swimming pool, a 20-metre pool, sports hall, spin studio, climbing wall, gym, and a cafe.
