= 1976 United Kingdom local elections =

- 6 May 1976

All 36 metropolitan boroughs, all 296 English districts and all 37 Welsh districts
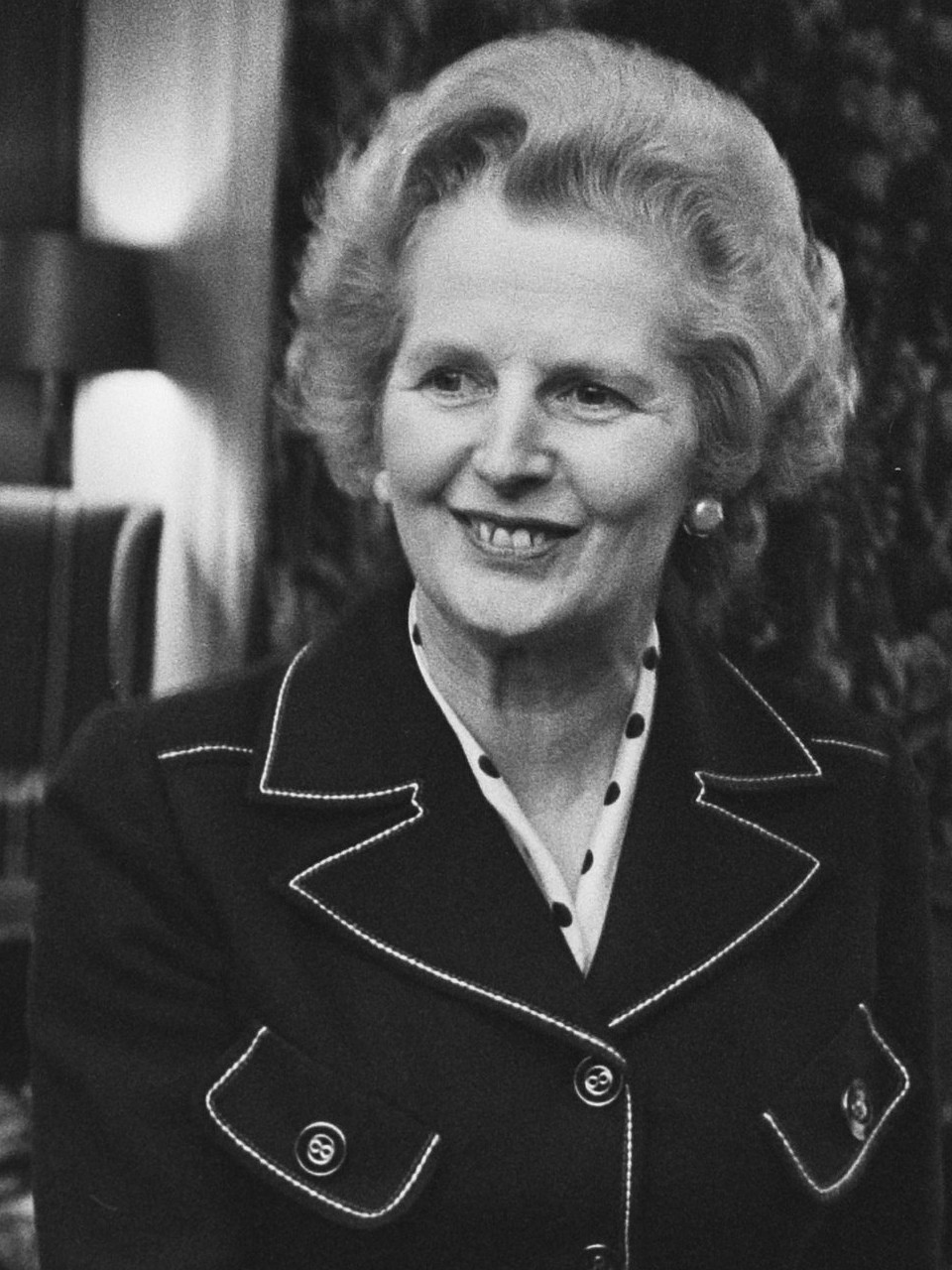

| | Majority party | Minority party | Third party |
|---|---|---|---|
| | | | Lib |
| Leader | Margaret Thatcher | James Callaghan | Jeremy Thorpe |
| Party | Conservative | Labour | Liberal |
| Leader since | 11 February 1975 | 5 April 1976 | 18 January 1967 |
| Councillors | 8,087 | 4,467 | 827 |
| Councillors +/- | ▲1,745 | ▼1,309 | ▼223 |

Local elections were held in the United Kingdom on 6 May 1976. Elections were for one third of the seats on Metropolitan borough councils and for all seats on Non-Metropolitan district councils in England; and for all seats on the Welsh district councils.

The elections were the first electoral test for the new Prime Minister James Callaghan, and were a major reverse for the ruling Labour Party. The opposition Conservative party made large gains of seats and control of councils at the expense of both Labour and the Liberal Party.

The Conservatives easily gained control of their principal target council, Birmingham. The new administration in the city pledged to reintroduce the sale of council houses, which had been stopped by the previous Labour-controlled council. Control of another five metropolitan borough councils were gained by the Conservatives at Labour's expense. The party also gained numerous non-metropolitan districts, including large towns and cities such as Derby, Exeter, Ipswich, Leicester, Luton, Milton Keynes, Oxford, Peterborough and York.

Major English councils held by Labour included Manchester, Norwich, Nottingham and Stoke-on-Trent.

Break-away groups from the official Labour Party achieved success in two districts. The Lincoln Democratic Labour Association retained control of the city council. The association had been formed following the expulsion of local member of parliament, Dick Taverne from the party. In Blyth Valley the Independent Labour Party gained nine seats from the official Labour candidates. The ILP were supporters of Eddie Milne, former MP for Blyth. Milne had been expelled from Labour in April 1974. Labour lost control of North East Derbyshire, where all the party's seats in Clay Cross passed to Ratepayer candidates. The town had been the scene of a dispute between the former urban district council and the government over the Housing Finance Act. The Ecology Party won its first elected representation on Rother District Council.

The Liberals lost control of their only local authority, Liverpool City Council. Labour became the largest party on the council, which was under no overall control.

In Wales, the dominant position of Labour was overturned. Major Labour losses were Cardiff and Newport to the Conservatives, Swansea to Ratepayers and Merthyr Tydfil to Plaid Cymru.

== England ==
=== Metropolitan boroughs ===
| District | County | Conservative | Labour | Liberal | Independent | Other | Control | Details |
|---|---|---|---|---|---|---|---|---|
| Barnsley | South Yorkshire | 1 | 39 (-4) | 5 (+3) | 0 | Ratepayers 11 Independent Labour 4 (+1) | Labour hold | Details |
| Birmingham | West Midlands | 66 (+11) | 52 (-11) | 8 | 0 | 0 | Conservative gain from Labour | Details |
| Bolton | Greater Manchester | 43 (+3) | 20 (-3) | 2 (-1) | 4 (+1) | 0 | Conservative hold | Details |
| Bradford | West Yorkshire | 61 (+4) | 27 (-1) | 5 (-3) | 0 | 0 | Conservative hold | Details |
| Bury | Greater Manchester | 36 (+8) | 11 (-5) | 1 (-3) | 0 | 0 | Conservative hold | Details |
| Calderdale | West Yorkshire | 34 (+6) | 13 (-5) | 4 (-1) | 0 | 0 | Conservative hold | Details |
| Coventry | West Midlands | 26 (+5) | 28 (-5) | 0 | 0 | 0 | Labour hold | Details |
| Doncaster | South Yorkshire | 17 (+2) | 35 (-5) | 0 | 4 (+1) | Ratepayers 3 (+2) Democratic Labour 1 | Labour hold | Details |
| Dudley | West Midlands | 37 (+8) | 26 (-9) | 2 (+1) | 0 | Independent Socialist 1 | Conservative gain from Labour | Details |
| Gateshead | Tyne and Wear | 13 (+2) | 59 (-4) | 4 (+1) | 1 (+1) | Rent and Ratepayers 1 | Labour hold | Details |
| Kirklees | West Yorkshire | 38 (+10) | 25 (-11) | 9 (+2) | 0 (-1) | 0 | Conservative gain from Labour | Details |
| Knowsley | Merseyside | 17 (+5) | 42 (-4) | 2 (-1) | 0 | Kirkby Householders Federation 2 | Labour hold | Details |
| Leeds | West Yorkshire | 50 (+7) | 38 (-3) | 8 (-4) | 0 | 0 | Conservative gain from NOC | Details |
| Liverpool | Merseyside | 17 (+3) | 42 | 40 (-3) | 0 | 0 | NOC | Details |
| Manchester | Greater Manchester | 45 | 54 | 0 | 0 | 0 | Labour hold | Details |
| Newcastle upon Tyne | Tyne and Wear | 29 (+2) | 44 (-3) | 3 +1 | 2 | 0 | Labour hold | Details |
| North Tyneside | Tyne and Wear | 28 (+4) | 44 (-2) | 8 (-2) | 4 | 0 | Labour hold | Details |
| Oldham | Greater Manchester | 28 (+13) | 20 (-10) | 8 (-3) | 1 | 0 | Labour lose to NOC | Details |
| Rochdale | Greater Manchester | 31 (+7) | 19 (-8) | 10 (+1) | 0 | 0 | Conservative gain from NOC | Details |
| Rotherham | South Yorkshire | 6 | 45 | 0 | 3 | 0 | Labour hold | Details |
| St Helens | Merseyside | 19 (+4) | 25 (-4) | 1 | 0 | 0 | Labour hold | Details |
| Salford | Greater Manchester | 24 (+3) | 38 (-4) | 2 | 0 | Tenants & Ratepayers 2 (+1) | Labour | Details |
| Sandwell | West Midlands | 39 (+7) | 51 (-7) | 0 | 0 | 0 | Labour hold | Details |
| Sefton | Merseyside | 43 | 21 | 3 | 1 | Ratepayers 1 | Conservative hold | Details |
| Sheffield | South Yorkshire | 22 (+2) | 63 (-3) | 5 (+1) | 0 | 0 | Labour | Details |
| Solihull | West Midlands | 34 (+4) | 12 (-1) | 1 | Independent Resident 4 (-3) | 0 | Conservative hold | Details |
| South Tyneside | Tyne and Wear | 4 | 34 (-1) | 3 | 0 | Progressive 24 (+1) | Labour hold | Details |
| Stockport | Greater Manchester | 39 (+5) | 11 (-1) | 7 (-3) | 3 (-1) | 0 | Conservative hold | Details |
| Sunderland | Tyne and Wear | 26 (+3) | 49 (-3) | 2 | 1 | 0 | Labour hold | Details |
| Tameside | Greater Manchester | 29 (+5) | 22 (-5) | 2 | 0 | Independent Labour 1 | Conservative gain from Labour | Details |
| Trafford | Greater Manchester | 47 (+5) | 12 (-1) | 4 (-4) | 0 | 0 | Conservative hold | Details |
| Wakefield | West Yorkshire | 15 (+4) | 42 (-6) | 0 | 2 | Ratepayer 7 (+2) | Labour hold | Details |
| Walsall | West Midlands | 20 | 28 (-3) | 1 | 3 (+1) | Ratepayers 7 (+2) Independent Labour 1 | Labour lose to NOC | Details |
| Wigan | Greater Manchester | 14 (+4) | 56 (-5) | 1 | 1 (+1) | 0 | Labour hold | Details |
| Wirral | Merseyside | 42 | 18 | 6 | 0 | 0 | Conservative hold | Details |
| Wolverhampton | West Midlands | 24 (+3) | 34 (-4) | 0 | 0 | Ratepayers 2 (+1) | Labour hold | Details |
| Totals | | 1064 (+149) | 1199 (-141) | 154 (-19) | 30(0) | 68 (+10) | | |

=== District councils ===
==== A ====
| District | County | Conservative | Labour | Liberal | Independent | Other | Control | Details |
|---|---|---|---|---|---|---|---|---|
| Adur | West Sussex | 16 (+4) | 2 (-1) | 17 (-3) | 2 | 0 | Liberals lose to NOC | Details |
| Allerdale | Cumbria | 10 (+5) | 23 (-3) | 0 | 23 (-2) | 0 | Conservative - Independent hold | Details |
| Alnwick | Northumberland | 8 (+2) | 3 (-2) | 1 (+1) | 21 (-1) | Independent Labour 0 (-1) 1 vacancy | Independent hold | Details |
| Amber Valley | Derbyshire | 2 | 18 (-13) | 14 (+11) | 26 (+2) | 0 | Labour lose to NOC | Details |
| Arun | West Sussex | 51 (+17) | 1 (-3) | 5 (+1) | 2 (-9) | Ratepayers 1 (-6) | Conservative hold | Details |
| Ashfield† | Nottinghamshire | 2 | 22 | 0 | 1 | Ratepayers 8 | Labour hold | Details |
| Ashford† | Kent | 30 | 7 | 8 | 3 | Ratepayers 1 True Liberals 1; 4 vacancies | Conservative hold | Details |
| Aylesbury Vale† | Buckinghamshire | 28 | 9 | 2 | 18 | Ratepayers 1 | Independent lose to NOC | Details |

† New ward boundaries

==== B ====
| District | County | Conservative | Labour | Liberal | Independent | Other | Control | Details |
|---|---|---|---|---|---|---|---|---|
| Babergh | Suffolk | 7 | 11 | 0 | 20 | 0 | Independent | Details |
| Barrow-in-Furness | Cumbria | 19 (+14) | 12 (-14) | 0 | 2 | 0 | Conservative gain from Labour | Details |
| Basildon | Essex | 17 (+6) | 23 (-6) | 0 | 0 | 6 | Labour hold | Details |
| Basingstoke† | Hampshire | 35 | 14 | 1 | 9 | 0 | Conservative gain from NOC | Details |
| Bassetlaw | Nottinghamshire | 24 (+12) | 18 (-11) | 0 | 7 (-3) | Ratepayers 2 (+2) | Labour lose to NOC | Details |
| Bath† | Avon | 35 | 13 | 0 | 0 | 0 | Conservative gain from NOC | Details |
| Beaconsfield | Buckinghamshire | 32 (+7) | 0 (-2) | 0 (-3) | 5 | 5 (-2) | Conservative hold | Details |
| Berwick-upon-Tweed† | Northumberland | 0 | 3 | 3 | 21 | 0 | Independent hold | Details |
| Beverley | Humberside | 44 (+28) | 1 (-4) | 3 | 12 (-24) | 0 | Conservative gain from Independent | Details |
| Blaby | Leicestershire | 21 (+7) | 0 | 1 (-4) | 12 (-4) | Ratepayers 3 (+1) | Conservative gain from Independent | Details |
| Blackburn | Lancashire | 27 (+8) | 17 (-10) | 8 (-3) | 0 | Ratepayers 6 (+3) National Party 2 (+2) | NOC | Details |
| Blackpool† | Lancashire | 35 | 6 | 3 | 0 | 0 | Conservative hold | Details |
| Blyth Valley | Northumberland | 6 | 23 | 12 | 12 | Independent Labour 11 5 vacancies | Labour hold | Details |
| Bolsover | Nottinghamshire | 4 (+3) | 25 (-4) | 0 | 7 (+1) | 0 | Labour hold | Details |
| Boothferry† | Humberside | 12 | 3 | 0 | 19 | Ratepayers 1 | Independent hold | Details |
| Boston | Lincolnshire | 13 (+3) | 3 (-2) | 3 (-1) | 13 (-1) | Independent with Ratepayer support 2 (+1) | NOC (Independent-Conservative) | Details |
| Bournemouth | Dorset | 43 (+5) | 6 (-7) | 2 | 6 (+2) | 0 | Conservative hold | Details |
| Bracknell | Berkshire | 27 (+14) | 3 (-12) | 1 (-2) | 0 | 0 | Conservative gain from Labour | Details |
| Braintree | Essex | 39 (+19) | 8 (-14) | 1 (-2) | 0 | Ratepayers 10 (-3) | Conservative gain from NOC | Details |
| Breckland | Norfolk | 21 (+2) | 9 (-1) | 0 | 20 (-2) | Ratepayers 1 (+1) | NOC | Details |
| Brentwood† | Lincolnshire | 34 | 4 | 1 | 0 | 0 | Conservative hold | Details |
| Bridgnorth | Salop | 2 (+2) | 2 | 4 (+1) | 24 (-3) | 0 | Independent hold | Details |
| Brighton | East Sussex | 44 (+12) | 15 (-12) | 0 | 0 | 0 | Conservative hold | Details |
| Bristol | Avon | 34 (+9) | 47 (-9) | 3 | 0 | 0 | Labour hold | Details |
| Broadland | Norfolk | 29 (+8) | 1 (-5) | 2 (+1) | 17 (-3) | Ratepayers 0 (-1) | Conservative gain from NOC | Details |
| Bromsgrove | Hereford and Worcester | 32 (+7) | 8 (-5) | 0 | 0 | Ratepayers 2 (-2) | Conservative hold | Details |
| Broxbourne† | Hertfordshire | 36 | 6 | 0 | 0 | 0 | Conservative hold | Details |
| Broxtowe † | Nottinghamshire | 37 | 11 | 0 | 1 | 0 | Conservative hold | Details |
| Burnley† | Lancashire | 12 | 39 | 1 | 2 | 0 | Labour hold | Details |

† New ward boundaries

==== C ====
| District | County | Conservative | Labour | Liberal | Independent | Other | Control | Details |
|---|---|---|---|---|---|---|---|---|
| Cambridge | Cambridgeshire | 24 (+13) | 16 (-10) | 2 (-3) | 0 | 0 | Conservative gain from Labour | Details |
| Cannock Chase† | Staffordshire | 18 | 24 | 0 | 0 | 0 | Labour hold | Details |
| Canterbury | Kent | 46 (+9) | 1 (-6) | 0 | 1 (-2) | 2 (-1) | Conservative hold | Details |
| Caradon | Cornwall | 0 | 1 (+1) | 0 | 39 (-2) | Mebyon Kernow 1 (+1) | Independent hold | Details |
| Carlisle | Cumbria | 22 (+4) | 22 (-2) | 1 | 3 (-2) | 0 | Labour lose to NOC | Details |
| Carrick | Cornwall | 9 (+4) | 4 (-1) | 4 | 28 (-3) | 0 | Independent hold | Details |
| Castle Morpeth† | Northumberland | 9 | 5 | 2 | 15 | 0 | NOC | Details |
| Castle Point | Essex | 35 (+16) | 3 (-15) | 0 | 0 (-1) | 0 | Conservative gain from NOC | Details |
| Charnwood | Leicestershire | 42 (+8) | 13 (-1) | 2 (-3) | 1 (-4) | 0 | Conservative hold | Details |
| Chelmsford† | Essex | 46 | 3 | 9 | 2 | 0 | Conservative hold | Details |
| Cheltenham | Gloucestershire | 22 (+1) | 2 (-5) | 4 | 1 | Ratepayers Association 6 (+4) | Conservative hold | Details |
| Cherwell | Oxfordshire | 26 (+10) | 10 (-6) | 0 | 8 (-4) | 1 Vacancy | Conservative gain from NOC | Details |
| Chester | Cheshire | 44 (+3) | 10 (-5) | 2 (+1) | 1 (-3) | Ratepayers 5 (+4) | Conservative hold | Details |
| Chesterfield | Derbyshire | 14 (+6) | 36 (-7) | 2 | 1 (+1) | Independent Labour 1 | Labour hold | Details |
| Chester-le-Street | Durham | 0 | 22 (-2) | 6 | 5 (+2) | 0 | Labour hold | Details |
| Chichester | West Sussex | 33 (+18) | 0 | 1 (-5) | 11 (-11) | Residents 5 (+2) | Conservative hold | Details |
| Chiltern† | Buckinghamshire | 39 | 6 | 1 | 4 | 0 | Conservative hold | Details |
| Chorley† | Lancashire | 33 | 11 | 0 | 2 | Independent Labour 1 | Conservative gain from NOC | Details |
| Christchurch | Dorset | 18 (+1) | 4 | 0 | 0 (-1) | 0 | Conservative hold | Details |
| Cleethorpes | Humberside | 13 (+4) | 13 | 5 (-2) | 15 (-2) | Ratepayers 1 Independent Socialist 1 | NOC | Details |
| Colchester | Essex | 39 | 18 | 0 | 1 | Ratepayers 2 | Conservative gain from NOC | Details |
| Congleton | Cheshire | 30 | 5 | 2 | 7 | Ratepayers 1 | Conservative gain from NOC | Details |
| Copeland | Cumbria | 15 (+6) | 22 (-10) | 0 | 7 | Tenants and Ratepayers Association 3 (+3) Community Association 1 (+1) | Labour lose to NOC | Details |
| Corby† | Northamptonshire | 16 | 10 | 0 | 1 | 0 | Conservative gain from Labour | Details |
| Cotswold | Gloucestershire | 4 (+3) | 0 (-1) | 0 | 41 (-2) | 0 | Independent hold | Details |
| Craven | North Yorkshire | 21 (+7) | 2 (-3) | 5 (-4) | 6 | Independent Socialist 1 | Conservative gain from NOC | Details |
| Crawley | West Sussex | 11 (+11) | 14 (-11) | 0 | 0 | 0 | Labour hold | Details |
| Crewe | Cheshire | 28 (+21) | 24 (-9) | 0 (-2) | 4 (-14) | Ratepayers and Residents 4 (+4) | Labour lose to NOC | Details |

† New ward boundaries

==== D ====
| District | County | Conservative | Labour | Liberal | Independent | Other | Control | Details |
|---|---|---|---|---|---|---|---|---|
| Dacorum | Hertfordshire | 38 (+11) | 21 (-10) | 0 (-1) | 3 | 0 | Conservative gain from Labour | Details |
| Darlington | Durham | 30 (+22) | 15 (-13) | 0 (-8) | 4 (-1) | 0 | Conservative gain from Labour | Details |
| Dartford† | Kent | 20 | 25 | 0 | 0 | 0 | Labour hold | Details |
| Daventry | Northamptonshire | 24 (+8) | 2 (-6) | 0 | 9 (-2) | 0 | Conservative gain from NOC | Details |
| Derby | Derbyshire | 28 (+14) | 26 (-8) | 0 (-6) | 0 | 0 | Conservative gain from Labour | Details |
| Derwentside | Durham | 2 (+1) | 39 (-6) | 5 (+2) | 9 (+3) | 0 | Labour hold | Details |
| Dover | Kent | 36 (+5) | 17 (-5) | 0 | 2 | 0 | Conservative hold | Details |
| Durham | Durham | 0 | 34 (-7) | 10 (+3) | 16 (+3) | Independent Labour 1 (+1) | Labour hold | Details |

† New ward boundaries

==== E ====
| District | County | Conservative | Labour | Liberal | Independent | Other | Control | Details |
|---|---|---|---|---|---|---|---|---|
| Easington | Durham | 1 (+1) | 45 (-8) | 4 (+4) | 5 (+3) | Independent Labour 5 | Labour hold | Details |
| East Cambridgeshire | Cambridgeshire | 3 (+2) | 1 (-1) | 0 | 29 (-1) | Independent Socialist 1 Independent Conservative 2 | Independent hold | Details |
| East Devon | Devon | 44 (+31) | 1 | 0 | 13 (-31) | 0 | Conservative gain from Independent | Details |
| East Hampshire | Hampshire | 31 (+14) | 0 (-5) | 0 | 11 (-9) | 0 | Conservative gain from NOC | Details |
| East Hertfordshire | Hertfordshire | 28 (+12) | 1 (-9) | 0 | 0 (-5) | Ratepayers 8 (+2) | Conservative gain from NOC | Details |
| East Lindsey | Lincolnshire | 10 (+5) | 1 | 2 (-2) | 45 (-3) | 0 | Independent hold | Details |
| East Northamptonshire | Northamptonshire | 28 (+8) | 6 (-9) | 0 | 3 (+1) | 0 | Conservative hold | Details |
| East Staffordshire | Staffordshire | 37 (+17) | 12 (-14) | 1 (+1) | 10 (-4) | 0 | Conservative gain from Conservative-Independent | Details |
| Eastbourne† | East Sussex | 25 | 4 | 1 | 0 | 0 | NOC | Details |
| Eastleigh | Hampshire | | | | | | Conservative gain | Details |
| Eden | Cumbria | 0 | 0 | 0 | 26 (-5) | Ratepayers 10 (+5) 1 vacancy | Independent hold | Details |
| Ellesmere Port† | Cheshire | 17 | 22 | 1 | 1 | 0 | Labour hold | Details |
| Elmbridge† | Surrey | 36 | 7 | 3 | 14 | 0 | Conservative hold | Details |
| Epping Forest | Essex | 53 (+7) | 1 (-9) | 0 | 5 (+2) | 0 | Conservative hold | Details |
| Epsom and Ewell† | Surrey | 0 | 3 | 0 | 0 | Ratepayers 36 | Ratepayers hold | Details |
| Erewash | Derbyshire | 37 (+28) | 4 (-32) | 5 | 5 (+1) | Independent Labour 3 (+3) | Conservative gain from Labour | Details |
| Exeter | Devon | 24 (+7) | 9 (-2) | 6 (-4) | 1 (-1) | 0 | Conservative gain from NOC | Details |

† New ward boundaries

==== F ====
| District | County | Conservative | Labour | Liberal | Independent | Other | Control | Details |
|---|---|---|---|---|---|---|---|---|
| Fareham† | Hampshire | 21 | 2 | 1 | 2 | 10 | Conservative gain from NOC | Details |
| Fenland† | Cambridgeshire | 27 | 8 | 1 | 4 | 0 | Conservative gain from NOC | Details |
| Forest Heath | Suffolk | 13 (+3) | 0 | 1 | 9 (-5) | Ratepayers 2 (+2) | Conservative gain from Independent | Details |
| Forest of Dean | Gloucestershire | 7 (+1) | 12 | 2 | 26 (-1) | 0 | Independent hold | Details |
| Fylde† | Lancashire | 25 | 1 | 5 | 7 | Others 9 | Conservative hold | Details |

† New ward boundaries

==== G ====
| District | County | Conservative | Labour | Liberal | Independent | Other | Control | Details |
|---|---|---|---|---|---|---|---|---|
| Gedling† | Nottinghamshire | 42 | 10 | 0 | 0 | Independent Ratepayers 3 | Conservative hold | Details |
| Gillingham | Kent | 32 (+19) | 3 (-11) | 0 (-8) | 0 | 0 | Conservative gain from NOC | Details |
| Glanford | Humberside | 16 (+10) | 0 (-1) | 0 | 18 (-9) | 0 | Independent hold | Details |
| Gloucester | Gloucestershire | 26 (+6) | 6 (-7) | 1 (+1) | 0 | 0 | Conservative hold | Details |
| Gosport | Hampshire | 18 (+9) | 8 (-11) | 0 | 2 | Ratepayers 5 (+2) | Conservative gain from Labour | Details |
| Gravesham | Kent | 26 (+9) | 17 (-9) | 0 | 1 | 0 | Conservative gain from Labour | Details |
| Great Yarmouth | Norfolk | 32 (+6) | 13 (-4) | 2 | 1 (-2) | 0 | Conservative hold | Details |
| Grimsby | Humberside | 23 (+9) | 13 (-7) | 5 (-2) | 1 | 0 | Conservative gain from NOC | Details |
| Guildford† | Surrey | 35 | 6 | 2 | 2 | 0 | Conservative hold | Details |

† Ward boundary changes

==== H ====
| District | County | Conservative | Labour | Liberal | Independent | Other | Control | Details |
|---|---|---|---|---|---|---|---|---|
| Halton† | Cheshire | 17 | 26 | 1 | 3 | 0 | Labour hold | Details |
| Hambleton | North Yorkshire | 4 | 0 | 1 | 43 | 0 | Independent hold | Details |
| Harborough | Leicestershire | 31 (+2) | 1 (-2) | 1 (+1) | 4 (-1) | 0 | Conservative hold | Details |
| Harlow† | Essex | 3 | 35 | 4 | 0 | 0 | Labour hold | Details |
| Harrogate | North Yorkshire | 42 (+7) | 2 (-11) | 3 | 12 (+4) | Whig 1 | Conservative hold | Details |
| Hart† | Hampshire | 14 | 2 | 0 | 16 | Ratepayers 3 | Independent lose to NOC | Details |
| Hartlepool† | Cleveland | 15 | 17 | 0 | 2 | Ratepayers Association 13 | Labour lose to NOC | Details |
| Hastings | East Sussex | 20 (+8) | 8 (-3) | 4 (-5) | 1 | 0 | Conservative gain from NOC | Details |
| Havant† | Hampshire | 18 | 9 | 3 | 0 | Ratepayers 12 | NOC | Details |
| Hereford | Hereford and Worcester | 8 (+8) | 4 (-5) | 7 (-1) | 4 (-2) | Others 1 | NOC | Details |
| Hertsmere† | Hertfordshire | 25 | 10 | 4 | 0 | 0 | Conservative gain from NOC | Details |
| High Peak | Derbyshire | 27 (+5) | 8 (-3) | 2 (-1) | 8 (-1) | Ratepayers 1 | Conservative gain from Conservative-Independent | Details |
| Hinckley and Bosworth | Leicestershire | 29 (+24) | 2 (-13) | 2 (-6) | 1 (-5) | 0 | Conservative gain from NOC | Details |
| Holderness† | Humberside | 4 | 0 | 0 | 27 | 0 | Independent hold | Details |
| Horsham | West Sussex | 31 (+15) | 0 (-1) | 0 (-2) | 11 (-13) | Ratepayers and Residents Association 1 (+1) | Conservative gain from Independent | Details |
| Hove | East Sussex | 33 (+5) | 2 (-4) | 0 | 0 | Ratepayers 1 (-1) | Conservative hold | Details |
| Huntingdon† | Cambridgeshire | 32 | 1 | 0 | 20 | 0 | Conservative gain from NOC | Details |
| Hyndburn | Lancashire | 33 | 14 | 1 | 0 | 0 | Conservative gain from NOC | Details |

† New ward boundaries

==== I ====
| District | County | Conservative | Labour | Liberal | Independent | Other | Control | Details |
|---|---|---|---|---|---|---|---|---|
| Ipswich | Suffolk | 26 (+13) | 21 (-13) | 0 | 0 | 0 | Conservative gain from Labour | Details |

==== K ====
| District | County | Conservative | Labour | Liberal | Independent | Other | Control | Details |
|---|---|---|---|---|---|---|---|---|
| Kennet† | Wiltshire | 9 | 2 | 2 | 25 | 1 vacancy | Independent hold | Details |
| Kerrier | Cornwall | 9 | 3 | 1 (+1) | 28 (-2) | 1 (+1) | Independent hold | Details |
| Kettering | Northamptonshire | 20 (+6) | 14 (-2) | 5 (-2) | 6 (-2) | 0 | NOC | Details |
| Kingston upon Hull | Humberside | 19 (+10) | 44 (-10) | 0 | 0 | 0 | Labour hold | Details |
| Kingswood† | Avon | 22 | 18 | 3 | 4 | 0 | NOC | Details |

† New ward boundaries

==== L ====
| District | County | Conservative | Labour | Liberal | Independent | Other | Control | Details |
|---|---|---|---|---|---|---|---|---|
| Lancaster | Lancashire | 43 (+9) | 11 (-6) | 1 | 5 (+1) | 0 | Conservative hold | Details |
| Langbaurgh† | Cleveland | 33 | 19 | 0 | 8 | 0 | Conservative gain from Labour | Details |
| Leicester | Leicestershire | 27 (+16) | 21 (-16) | 0 | 0 | 0 | Conservative gain from Labour | Details |
| Leominster | Hereford and Worcester | 3 (+1) | 2 (-1) | 2 (-1) | 28 | Independent Liberal 1 (+1) | Independent hold | Details |
| Lewes | East Sussex | 37 (+10) | 6 (-4) | 0 | 4 (-6) | Ratepayers 5 | Conservative hold | Details |
| Lichfield | Staffordshire | 46 (+24) | 4 (-20) | 0 | 6 (-4) | 0 | Conservative gain from NOC | Details |
| Lincoln | Lincolnshire | 13 (+7) | 0 (-3) | 0 | 0 (-4) | Democratic Labour 17 | Democratic Labour hold | Details |
| Luton† | Bedfordshire | 37 | 10 | 1 | 0 | 0 | Conservative again from Labour | Details |

† New ward boundaries

==== M ====
| District | County | Conservative | Labour | Liberal | Independent | Other | Control | Details |
|---|---|---|---|---|---|---|---|---|
| Macclesfield | Cheshire | 34 | 5 | 3 | 0 | Ratepayers and Independents 17 5 vacancies | Conservative gain from NOC | Details |
| Maidstone | Kent | 39 (+25) | 7 (-4) | 7 (-11) | 7 (-10) | 0 | Conservative gain from NOC | Details |
| Maldon | Essex | 20 (+6) | 11 (-3) | 9 (-2) | 14 (-1) | 0 | Conservative gain from NOC | Details |
| Malvern Hills | Hereford and Worcester | 12 | 3 | 3 | 29 | 0 | Independent hold | Details |
| Mansfield | Nottinghamshire | 10 (+3) | 34 (-4) | 1 (+1) | 0 | 0 | Labour hold | Details |
| Medina | Isle of Wight | 11 (+8) | 6 (-4) | 6 (+2) | 8 (-5) | Ratepayers 2 (-1) | NOC hold | Details |
| Medway | Kent | 45 (+22) | 11 (-20) | 0 | 3 (-2) | 0 | Conservative gain from Labour | Details |
| Melton | Leicestershire | 18 (+2) | 1 (-1) | 0 | 1 (-1) | 3 1 vacancy | Conservative hold | Details |
| Mendip | Somerset | 20 (+11) | 3 (-4) | 3 | 18 (-7) | 0 | NOC | Details |
| Mid Bedfordshire | Bedfordshire | 19 (+11) | 3 (-5) | 1 (-1) | 26 (-5) | 0 | Independent hold | Details |
| Mid Suffolk | Suffolk | 13 (+3) | 7 (-2) | 2 (-1) | 18 (-2) | 0 | Conservative-Independent hold | Details |
| Mid Sussex | West Sussex | 39 (+13) | 0 (-4) | 1 (-4) | 14 (-5) | 0 | Conservative gain from NOC | Details |
| Middlesbrough | Cleveland | 17 | 38 (-1) | 0 | 1 (+1) | 0 | Labour hold | Details |
| Milton Keynes† | Buckinghamshire | 33 | 12 | 0 | 1 | 0 | Conservative gain from Labour | Details |
| Mole Valley† | Surrey | 18 | 1 | 2 | 3 | Ratepayers 9 | NOC | Details |

† New ward boundaries

==== N ====
| District | County | Conservative | Labour | Liberal | Independent | Other | Control | Details |
|---|---|---|---|---|---|---|---|---|
| New Forest† | Hampshire | 30 | 0 | 5 | 7 | Ratepayers 5 | Conservative gain from Independent | Details |
| Newark | Nottinghamshire | 29 (+9) | 17 (-11) | 0 | 3 (-1) | Ratepayers 2 (+2) Independent Labour 1 (+1) | Conservative gain from Labour | Details |
| Newbury | Berkshire | 30 (+18) | 1 | 15 (-8) | 11 (-10) | 0 | Conservative gain from NOC | Details |
| Newcastle-under-Lyme | Staffordshire | 20 (+4) | 29 (-3) | 2 (+1) | 12 (-2) | 0 | Labour lose to NOC | Details |
| North Bedfordshire | Bedfordshire | 34 (+14) | 9 (-14) | 6 (+4) | 7 (-4) | 0 | Conservative gain from NOC | Details |
| North Cornwall | Cornwall | 0 | 0 | 3 (+2) | 39 (-2) | 2 vacancies | Independent hold | Details |
| North Devon | Devon | 5 (+5) | 0 (-1) | 12 (-2) | 27 (-2) | 0 | Independent hold | Details |
| North Dorset | Dorset | 0 | 0 | 2 (-3) | 29 (+3) | 0 | Independent hold | Details |
| North East Derbyshire | Derbyshire | 15 (+5) | 19 (-14) | 0 | 9 (+1) | Ratepayers 6 (+6) Independent Labour 2 (+2) | Labour lose to NOC | Details |
| North Hertfordshire | Hertfordshire | 30 (+6) | 11 (-6) | 0 | 5 (-1) | Ratepayers 2 (+1) | Conservative gain from NOC | Details |
| North Kesteven | Lincolnshire | 4 (+3) | 2 | 0 | 30 (-3) | 0 | Independent hold | Details |
| North Norfolk | Norfolk | 7 (+1) | 1 (-3) | 0 | 34 (-3) | Ratepayers 5 (+5) | Independent hold | Details |
| North Shropshire† | Shropshire | 2 | 2 | 1 | 35 | 0 | Independent hold | Details |
| North Warwickshire | Warwickshire | 13 (+5) | 16 (-2) | 0 | 4 (-3) | 0 | Labour lose to NOC | Details |
| North West Leicestershire | Leicestershire | 13 (+5) | 10 (-6) | 0 | 10 | 1 (+1) | Labour lose to NOC | Details |
| North Wiltshire | Wiltshire | 37 (+12) | 5 (-3) | 3 (-5) | 5 (-4) | 0 | Conservative gain from NOC | Details |
| North Wolds† | Humberside | 10 | 0 | 2 | 31 | 0 | Independent hold | Details |
| Northampton | Northamptonshire | 32 (+9) | 16 (-9) | 0 | 0 | 0 | Conservative gain from Labour | Details |
| Northavon† | Avon | 39 | 14 | 0 | 4 | 0 | Conservative hold | Details |
| Norwich | Norfolk | 12 (+1) | 36 (-1) | 0 | 0 | 0 | Labour hold | Details |
| Nottingham† | Nottinghamshire | 40 | 14 | 0 | 0 | Ratepayers 1 | Labour hold | Details |
| Nuneaton | Warwickshire | 14 (+7) | 18 (-8) | 3 (+1) | 0 | 0 | Labour hold | Details |

==== O ====
| District | County | Conservative | Labour | Liberal | Independent | Other | Control | Details |
|---|---|---|---|---|---|---|---|---|
| Oadby and Wigston | Leicestershire | 25 (+5) | 1 (-2) | 4 (-3) | 0 | 0 | Conservative hold | Details |
| Oswestry† | Shropshire | 3 | 2 | 3 | 19 | 0; 2 vacancies | Independent hold | Details |
| Oxford | Oxfordshire | 30 (+18) | 15 (-15) | 0 (-1) | 0 (-2) | 0 | Conservative gain from Labour | Details |

† New ward boundaries

==== P ====
| District | County | Conservative | Labour | Liberal | Independent | Other | Control | Details |
|---|---|---|---|---|---|---|---|---|
| Pendle | Lancashire | 27 | 17 | 6 | 1 | 0 | Conservative gain from NOC | Details |
| Penwith | Cornwall | 0 | 1 | 1 | 38 | 0 | Independent hold | Details |
| Peterborough† | Cambridgeshire | 25 | 22 | 1 | 0 | 0 | Conservative gain from Labour | Details |
| Plymouth | Devon | 39 (+2) | 27 (-2) | 0 | 0 | 0 | Conservative hold | Details |
| Poole | Dorset | 26 (+4) | 2 (-1) | 8 (-1) | 0 | Ratepayers 0 (-2) | Conservative hold | Details |
| Portsmouth | Hampshire | 31 | 14 (+1) | 0 (-1) | 3 (+1) | Independent Conservative 0 (-1) | Conservative hold | Details |
| Preston | Lancashire † | 43 | 13 | 1 | 0 | 0 | Conservative gain from Labour | Details |
| Purbeck | Dorset | 7 (+2) | 0 (-3) | 0 | 12 (-1) | Ratepayers 2 (+2) | Independent hold | Details |

† New ward boundaries

==== R ====
| District | County | Conservative | Labour | Liberal | Independent | Other | Control | Details |
|---|---|---|---|---|---|---|---|---|
| Reading | Berkshire | 21 (+5) | 14 (-2) | 11 (-3) | | 0 | NOC | Details |
| Redditch | Hereford and Worcester | 16 (+10) | 7 (-12) | 0 | 2 (+2) | 0 | Conservative gain from Labour | Details |
| Reigate and Banstead | Surrey | 45 (+4) | 13 (-1) | 2 (-3) | 0 | 0 | Conservative hold | Details |
| Restormel | Cornwall | 0 | 0 | 6 (+4) | 32 (-4) | 0 | Independent hold | Details |
| Ribble Valley † | Lancashire | 29 | 2 | 0 | 6 | Independent Conservative 1 | Conservative hold | Details |
| Richmondshire | North Yorkshire | 0 | 0 | 0 | 35 | 0 | Independent hold | Details |
| Rochford † | Essex | 29 | 1 | 2 | 8 | 0 | Conservative hold | Details |
| Rossendale † | Lancashire | 29 | 4 | 3 | 0 | 0 | Conservative gain from NOC | Details |
| Rother | East Sussex | 14 (+4) | 4 (-1) | 0 (-1) | 20 (-2) | Ratepayers 6 (-1) Ecology Party 1 (+1) | NOC | Details |
| Rugby | Warwickshire | 22 (+7) | 18 (-7) | 1 | 2 (-1) | Ratepayers 6 (+1) | Conservative gain from NOC | Details |
| Runnymede † | Surrey | 31 | 7 | 1 | 3 | 0 | Conservative hold | Details |
| Rushcliffe † | Nottinghamshire | 48 (+6) | 3 | 0 | 2 (-1) | Ratepayers 1 | Conservative hold | Details |
| Rushmoor | Hampshire | 30 (+8) | 5 (-4) | 4 (-3) | 0 | Cove Ratepayers Association 4 (-3) | Conservative gain from NOC | Details |
| Rutland | Leicestershire | 0 | 1 | 0 | 19 | 0 | Independent hold | Details |
| Ryedale | North Yorkshire | 5 (+1) | 1 (-3) | 0 | 37 (+2) | 0 | Independent | Details |

† New ward boundaries

==== S ====
| District | County | Conservative | Labour | Liberal | Independent | Other | Control | Details |
|---|---|---|---|---|---|---|---|---|
| St Albans | Hertfordshire | 45 (+12) | 6 (-8) | 1 (-6) | 2 (+2) | 0 | Conservative gain from NOC | Details |
| St Edmundsbury | Suffolk | 30 (+3) | 9 (-2) | 0 | 5 (-1) | 0 | Conservative hold | Details |
| Salisbury † | Wiltshire | 21 | 9 | 7 | 17 | Ratepayers 4 | NOC | Details |
| Scarborough | North Yorkshire | 28 (+7) | 3 (-1) | 5 (-5) | 13 (-1) | 0 | Conservative gain from NOC | Details |
| Scunthorpe | Humberside | 13 (+8) | 27 (-8) | 0 | 0 | 0 | Labour hold | Details |
| Sedgefield | Durham | 1 | 36 (-7) | 1 (-1) | 15 (+8) | 0 | Labour hold | Details |
| Sedgemoor | Somerset | 25 (+6) | 12 (-2) | 1 (-2) | 10 (-2) | 0 | Conservative gain from NOC | Details |
| Selby | North Yorkshire | 19 | 7 (-1) | 0 | 22 (+1) | 0 | NOC | Details |
| Sevenoaks | Kent | 36 (+7) | 2 (-3) | 4 (-4) | 12 | 0 | Details | Conservative hold |
| Shepway | Kent | 33 (+1) | 9 (-3) | 4 (+3) | 8 (-1) | 0 | Conservative hold | Details |
| Shrewsbury † | Shropshire | 23 | 13 | 5 | 7 | 0 | NOC | Details |
| Slough | Berkshire | 27 (+25) | 11 (-23) | 2 (-2) | 0 | 0 | Conservative gain from Labour | Details |
| South Bedfordshire † | Bedfordshire | 40 | 5 | 6 | 2 | 0 | Conservative gain from NOC | Details |
| South Cambridgeshire † | Cambridgeshire | 4 | 6 | 3 | 42 | 0 | Independent hold | Details |
| South Derbyshire | Derbyshire | 7 (+3) | 13 (-5) | 3 (+3) | 11 (-2) | Ind Conservative 1 (+1) | NOC gain from Labour | Details |
| South Hams | Devon | 3 (+1) | 0 | 0 | 38 (-1) | 0 | Independent hold | Details |
| South Herefordshire | Hereford and Worcester | 0 | 0 | 0 | 35 (-1) | Ratepayers 1 (+1) | Independent hold | Details |
| South Holland | Lincolnshire | 8 (+1) | 1 (-1) | 0 | 22 (-4) | Ratepayers 4 (+4) | Independent hold | Details |
| South Kesteven | Lincolnshire | 17 | 8 (-4) | 0 | 13 (-1) | 17 (+5) | NOC | Details |
| South Lakeland | Cumbria | 14 (+5) | 4 | 6 (-3) | 30 (-2) | 0 | Independent hold | Details |
| South Norfolk | Norfolk | 23 (+17) | 0 (-7) | 2 (+1) | 21 (-12) | Ind Conservative 1 (+1) | NOC gain from Independent | Details |
| South Northamptonshire † | Northamptonshire | 20 | 1 | 1 | 18 | 0 | NOC | Details |
| South Oxfordshire | Oxfordshire | 35 | 7 | 4 | 16 | 0 | Conservative gain from NOC | Details |
| South Ribble † | Lancashire | 44 | 9 | 0 | 1 | 0 | Conservative hold | Details |
| South Shropshire † | Shropshire | 0 | 2 | 2 | 33 | Ratepayers 3 | Independent hold | Details |
| South Staffordshire | Staffordshire | 26 | 5 (-4) | 1 (-1) | 15 (+5) | Christian Action 2 | Conservative hold | Details |
| South Wight | Isle of Wight | 7 (+6) | 0 | 2 (+1) | 14 (-7) | Ratepayers 1 | Independent hold | Details |
| Southampton | Hampshire | 20 | 31 | 0 | 0 | 0 | Labour | Details |
| Essex | 29 (+5) | 4 (-9) | 6 (-5) | 0 | 0 | Conservative gain from NOC | Details | |
| Spelthorne | Surrey | 45 (+6) | 7 (-6) | 0 | 0 | 0 | Conservative hold | Details |
| Stafford | Staffordshire | 15 (-1) | 13 | 4 (+3) | 25 (-2) | 0 | NOC | Details |
| Staffordshire Moorlands | Staffordshire | Conservative & Independent 44 | 11 | 1 | 0 | 0 | Conservative and Independent hold | Details |
| Stevenage | Hertfordshire | 6 (+3) | 28 (-3) | 0 | 0 | 0 | Labour hold | Details |
| Stockton-on-Tees | Cleveland | 31 (+4) | 25 (-7) | 0 | 4 (+3) | 0 | Conservative gain from Labour | Details |
| Stoke-on-Trent | Staffordshire | 20 (+11) | 49 (-11) | 3 | 0 | 0 | Labour hold | Details |
| Stratford-on-Avon | Warwickshire | 25 (+3) | 0 (-1) | 4 (-2) | 22 (-3) | Ratepayers 3 (+3) | Independent lose to NOC | Details |
| Stroud | Gloucestershire | 33 (+13) | 9 (-3) | 5 (-4) | 8 (-6) | Independent Liberal 1 | Conservative gain from Conservative and Independent | Details |
| Suffolk Coastal | Suffolk | 38 (+16) | 3 (-3) | 1 (-4) | 13 (-7) | 0 (-2) | Conservative gain from NOC | Details |
| Surrey Heath † | Surrey | 31 | 2 | 0 | 3 | 0 | Conservative hold | Details |
| Swale | Kent | 27 (+10) | 19 (-6) | 3 (-1) | 1 (-3) | 0 | Conservative gain from Labour | Details |

† New ward boundaries

==== T ====
| District | County | Conservative | Labour | Liberal | Independent | Other | Control | Details |
|---|---|---|---|---|---|---|---|---|
| Tamworth † | Staffordshire | 10 | 13 | 0 | 0 | Independent Ratepayers 4 | Labour lose to NOC | Details |
| Tandridge † | Surrey | 38 | 2 | 1 | 1 | 0 | Conservative hold | Details |
| Taunton Deane | Somerset | 26 (+3) | 11 (-3) | 0 | 11 | 0 | Conservative gain from NOC | Details |
| Teesdale | Durham | 0 | 4 (+2) | 0 | 25 (-2) | 0 | Independent hold | Details |
| Teignbridge | Devon | 7 (+7) | 1 (-7) | 3 (+2) | 45 (-2) | Ratepayers 1 | Independent hold | Details |
| Tendring † | Essex | 39 | 4 | 5 | 8 | Ratepayers 4 | Conservative hold | Details |
| Test Valley † | Hampshire | 19 | 3 | 1 | 17 | Ratepayers 1 | NOC | Details |
| Gloucestershire | 21 | 1 (+1) | 2 | 22 (-5) | 5 (+5) | NOC | Details | |
| Thamesdown † | Wiltshire | 22 | 21 | 1 | 2 | 0 | Labour lose to NOC | Details |
| Thanet | Kent | 39 (+4) | 11 | 0 (-4) | 11 | Ratepayers Association 2 | Conservative hold | Details |
| Three Rivers † | Hertfordshire | 32 | 10 | 5 | 0 | 0 | Conservative gain from NOC | Details |
| Thurrock | Essex | 11 (+7) | 25 (-7) | 0 | 3 | 0 | Labour hold | Details |
| Tiverton | Devon | 0 | 0 (-5) | 5 | 35 (+5) | 0 | Independent hold | Details |
| Tonbridge and Malling | Kent | 42 (+13) | 4 (-6) | 4 (-6) | 3 (-1) | 0 | Conservative hold | Details |
| Torbay | Devon | 34 (+3) | 0 (-4) | 0 | 0 | Ratepayers Association 2 (+1) | Conservative hold | Details |
| Torridge | Devon | 2 (+1) | 2 | 7 (+1) | 25 (-2) | 0 | Independent hold | Details |
| Tunbridge Wells † | Kent | 36 | 4 | 0 | 8 | 0 | Conservative hold | Details |
| Tynedale † | Northumberland | 8 | 11 | 4 | 23 | 1 | NOC | Details |

† New ward boundaries

==== U ====
| District | County | Conservative | Labour | Liberal | Independent | Other | Control | Details |
|---|---|---|---|---|---|---|---|---|
| Uttlesford † | Essex | 29 | 3 | 4 | 6 | 0 | Conservative hold | Details |

† New ward boundaries

==== V ====
| District | County | Conservative | Labour | Liberal | Independent | Other | Control | Details |
|---|---|---|---|---|---|---|---|---|
| Vale of White Horse | Oxfordshire | 40 (+11) | 4 (-4) | 1 (-2) | 3 (-5) | 0 | Conservative hold | Details |
| Vale Royal † | Cheshire | 25 | 14 | 4 | 13 | Ratepayers 3 | NOC | Details |

† New ward boundaries

==== W ====
| District | County | Conservative | Labour | Liberal | Independent | Other | Control | Details |
|---|---|---|---|---|---|---|---|---|
| Wansbeck † | Northumberland | 0 | 43 | 2 | 0 | Independent Labour 1 | Labour hold | Details |
| Wansdyke † | Avon | 25 | 13 | 0 | 8 | 0 | Conservative gain from NOC | Details |
| Warrington | Cheshire | 39 (+7) | 10 (-3) | 0 (-3) | 2 (-1) | 0 | Conservative hold | Details |
| Warwick | Warwickshire | 41 (+15) | 14 (-11) | 3 (-4) | 0 | 0 | Conservative gain from NOC | Details |
| Watford † | Hertfordshire | 19 | 17 | 0 | 0 | 0 | Conservative gain from Labour | Details |
| Waveney | Suffolk | 39 (+15) | 13 (-12) | 4 (-1) | 1 (-2) | 0 | Conservative gain from NOC | Details |
| Waverley | Surrey | 45 (+16) | 3 (+1) | 7 (-17) | 6 | 0 | Conservative gain from NOC | Details |
| Wealden | East Sussex | 41 (+19) | 0 (-1) | 0 (-3) | 15 (-15) | 0 | Conservative gain from NOC | Details |
| Wear Valley | Durham | 2 (+2) | 17 (-6) | 11 (+2) | 6 (+2) | 5 | Labour lose to NOC | Details |
| Wellingborough | Northamptonshire | 19 (+3) | 9 (-5) | 1 (+1) | 3 (+1) | Ratepayers 1 | Conservative gain from NOC | Details |
| Welwyn Hatfield † | Hertfordshire | 24 | 19 | 0 | 0 | 0 | Conservative gain from Labour | Details |
| West Derbyshire | Derbyshire | 29 (+10) | 2 (-4) | 3 | 2 (-5) | 4 (-1) | Conservative gain from NOC | Details |
| West Devon | Devon | 4 (+4) | 0 | 0 | 26 (-4) | 0 | Independent hold | Details |
| West Dorset | Dorset | 2 (+2) | 1 (-1) | 7 (-2) | 45 (+1) | 0 | Independent hold | Details |
| West Lancashire † | Lancashire | 34 | 15 | 1 | 5 | 0 | Conservative gain from NOC | Details |
| West Lindsey | Lincolnshire | 7 (+6) | 4 (-1) | 4 (-2) | 22 (-3) | 0 | Independent hold | Details |
| West Norfolk | Norfolk | 36 (+19) | 12 (-8) | 0 | 12 (-11) | 0 | Conservative gain from Independent-Conservative | Details |
| West Oxfordshire | Oxfordshire | 19 (+19) | 4 (-4) | 0 | 22 (-15) | 0 | Independent lose to NOC | Details |
| West Somerset | Somerset | 5 | 0 | 1 | 25 | 1 vacancy | Independent hold | Details |
| West Wiltshire | Wiltshire | 19 (+6) | 7 (-3) | 1 (-1) | 15 (-2) | 0 | NOC | Details |
| Weymouth and Portland | Dorset | 20 (+3) | 13 (-9) | 0 | 4 (+4) | Ratepayers 2 (+2) | Conservative gain from Labour | Details |
| Wimborne | Dorset | 19 (+18) | 0 | 3 (-7) | 8 (-13) | Ratepayers Association 3 (+2) | Conservative gain from Independent | Details |
| Winchester † | Hampshire | 24 | 4 | 3 | 23 | | Independent lose to NOC | Details |
| Windsor and Maidenhead | Berkshire | 55 (+2) | 0 (-3) | 1 (+1) | 3 | 0 | Conservative hold | Details |
| Woking † | Surrey | 27 | 8 | 0 | 0 | 0 | Conservative hold | Details |
| Wokingham | Berkshire | 36 (+10) | 0 | 8 (-4) | 8 (-6) | 0 | Conservative gain from NOC | Details |
| Woodspring | Avon | 50 (+11) | 7 (-3) | 0 (-4) | 4 (-4) | 0 | Conservative hold | Details |
| Worcester | Hereford and Worcester | 24 (+5) | 12 (-5) | 0 | 0 | 0 | Conservative hold | Details |
| Worthing | West Sussex | 26 (+4) | 0 (-1) | 1 | 0 | Ratepayers 3 (-3) | Conservative hold | Details |
| Wrekin | Shropshire | 13 (+3) | 30 (-1) | 0 | 12 (-2) | 0 | Labour hold | Details |
| Wychavon | Hereford and Worcester | 8 (+4) | 4 | 2 | 31 (-4) | 0 | Independent hold | Details |
| Wycombe | Buckinghamshire | 53 (+23) | 0 (-12) | 0 (-3) | 3 (-7) | Ratepayers 3 (-1) | Conservative | Details |
| Wyre | Lancashire | 48 (+2) | 0 (-2) | 2 (+2) | 4 (-3) | Ratepayers 1 (+1) | Conservative hold | Details |
| Wyre Forest | Hereford and Worcester | 28 (+14) | 7 (-12) | 9 (-2) | 1 | 0 | Conservative gain from NOC | Details |

† New ward boundaries

==== Y ====
| District | County | Conservative | Labour | Liberal | Independent | Other | Control | Details |
|---|---|---|---|---|---|---|---|---|
| Yeovil | Somerset | 28 | 7 | 1 | 24 | 0 | NOC | Details |
| York | North Yorkshire | 26 (+9) | 10 (-7) | 3 (-2) | 0 | 0 | Conservative gain from NOC | Details |

==== Totals ====
| District | County | Conservative | Labour | Liberal | Independent | Other | Control |
|---|---|---|---|---|---|---|---|
| Total Council Seats | | 6812 (+1523) | 2843 (-1003) | 607 (-203) | 2838 (-406) | 441(+63) | |

== Wales ==
=== District councils ===
| District | County | Conservative | Labour | Liberal | Plaid Cymru | Independent | Other | Control |
|---|---|---|---|---|---|---|---|---|
| Aberconwy | Gwynedd | 6 (+3) | 2 | 3 | 0 | 30 (-3) | 0 | Independent hold |
| Alyn and Deeside | Clwyd | 8 | 22 (-2) | 6 | 0 | 7 | Ratepayers 2 (+2) | Labour lose to NOC |
| Afan | West Glamorgan | 0 | 11 (-10) | 0 | 0 | 1 (+1) | Tenants Association 6 (+3) Ratepayers 12 (+6) | Labour lose to NOC |
| Arfon | Gwynedd | 0 | 5 (-3) | 0 | 13 (+8) | 23 (-5) | 0 | Independent hold |
| Blaenau Gwent | Gwent | 1 | 26 | 5 | 3 | 9 | 6 | Labour hold |
| Brecknock | Powys | 8 | 16 | 1 | 0 | 29 | 0 | Independent hold |
| Cardiff | South Glamorgan | 44 (+12) | 29 (-14) | 0 | 0 | 0 | Ratepayers 2 (+2) | Conservative gain from Labour |
| Carmarthen | Dyfed | 0 | 6 | 1 (+1) | 0 | 29 (-1) | 0 | Independent hold |
| Ceredigion | Dyfed | 0 | 3 (-1) | 7 (-1) | 2 (+1) | 30 (+1) | 1 vacancy | Independent hold |
| Colwyn | Clwyd | 16 (+13) | 0 | 6 (-4) | 0 | 11 (-9) | 0 | Conservative gain from Independent |
| Cynon Valley | Mid Glamorgan | 0 | 0 | 23 (+1) | 9 (-3) | 2 (+1) | Communist 1 Others 3 | Labour hold |
| Delyn | Clwyd | 2 (+1) | 15 (-1) | 1 (+1) | 2 (-1) | 16 | Ratepayers 4 | NOC |
| Dinefwr | Dyfed | 0 | 13 (-3) | 0 | 2 (+2) | 17 (+1) | 0 | Independent gain from Labour |
| Dwyfor | Gwynedd | 1 | 0 | 0 | 6 (+1) | 22 (-1) | 0 | Independent hold |
| Glyndŵr | Clwyd | 0 | 3 | 0 | 0 | 30 | 0 | Independent hold |
| Islwyn | Gwent | 0 | 16 (-14) | 0 | 7 (+5) | 9 (+5) | Ratepayers 6 (+2) Independent Socialist 1 (+1); Others 1 (+1) | Labour lose to NOC |
| Llanelli | Dyfed | 0 | 24 (-5) | 2 (+2) | 1 (+1) | 6 (+2) | 0 | Labour hold |
| Lliw Valley | West Glamorgan | 0 | 19 (-8) | 0 | 5 (+3) | 8 (+5) | 0 | Labour hold |
| Meirionnydd | Gwynedd | 0 | 3 (-1) | 0 | 8 (+8) | 28 (-7) | 0 | Independent hold |
| Merthyr Tydfil | Mid Glamorgan | 0 | 8 (-17) | 0 | 21 (+17) | 1 | Ratepayers 2 (-1) Independent Labour 1 (+1) | Plaid Cymru gain from Labour |
| Monmouth | Gwent | 30 (+1) | 7 (-1) | 0 | 0 | 2 | 0 | Conservative hold |
| Montgomery | Powys | 1 | 1 | 3 | 1 (+1) | 44 (-1) | 1 vacancy | Independent hold |
| Neath | West Glamorgan | 0 | 17 (-10) | 0 | 3 (+1) | 4 | Ratepayers 9 (+9) | Labour hold |
| Newport | Gwent | 26 (+18) | 22 (-14) | 0 (-2) | 0 | 3 (-2) | 0 | Conservative gain from Labour |
| Ogwr | Mid Glamorgan | 13 (+8) | 29 (-14) | 1 | 1 | 3 (+1) | Ratepayers 10 (+5) | Labour hold |
| Preseli | Dyfed | 0 | 0 | 0 | 0 | 43 | 0 | Independent hold |
| Radnor | Powys | 0 | 0 | 0 | 0 | 31 | 0 | Independent hold |
| Rhondda | Mid Glamorgan | 1 (+1) | 21 (-9) | 0 | 2 (+1) | 3 (+3) | Ratepayers 5 (+4); Communist 1 | Labour hold |
| Rhuddlan | Clwyd | 1 (-2) | 0 | 1 | 1 | 33 (+3) | 0 | Independent hold |
| Rhymney Valley | Mid Glamorgan | 0 | 19 (-15) | 0 | 23 (+15) | 2 | Ratepayers 4 | Labour lose to NOC |
| South Pembrokeshire | Dyfed | 0 | 0 | 0 | 0 (-1) | 31 (+1) | 0 | Independent hold |
| Swansea | West Glamorgan | 11 | 7 | 0 | 1 | 3 | Ratepayers 29 | Ratepayers gain from Labour |
| Taff-Ely | Mid Glamorgan | 1 (+1) | 24 (-5) | 4 (+1) | 8 (+6) | 5 (-4) | Tenants and Residents 3 Ratepayers 2 (+1) | Labour lose to NOC |
| Torfaen | Gwent | 1 | 24 | 0 | 1 | 10 | Ratepayers 6 Communist 1 | Labour hold |
| Vale of Glamorgan | South Glamorgan | 33 (+14) | 10 (-14) | 0 | 0 | 6 | 0 | Conservative gain from NOC |
| Wrexham Maelor | Clwyd | 7 (+3) | 20 (-4) | 2 | 2 (+1) | 14 | 0 | Labour lose to NOC |
| Ynys Môn (Anglesey) | Gwynedd | 0 | 5 | 0 | 1 (+1) | 39 (-1) | 0 | Independent hold |
| Totals | | 211 (+73) | 427 (-165) | 66 (-1) | 123 (+67) | 584 (-10) | 116 (+36) | |
