= 1976 Babergh District Council election =

- 6 May 1976

All 42 seats to Babergh District Council 22 seats needed for a majority

	First party	Second party	Third party
Party	Conservative	Independent	Labour
Seats won	17	15	4
Seat change	▲9	▼4	▼7
Popular vote	11,873	4,265	7,686
Percentage	44.4%	16.0%	28.8%
Swing	▲17.1%	▼19.8%	▼8.1%
	Fourth party	Fifth party
Party	Liberal	Residents
Seats won	1	1
Seat change	▲1	▲1
Popular vote	2,036	860
Percentage	7.6%	3.2%
Swing	N/A	N/A
Control before election
No overall control
Control after election
No overall control

The 1976 Babergh District Council election took place on 6 May 1976 to elect members of Babergh District Council in Suffolk, England. This was on the same day as other local elections.

== Summary ==
=== Election result ===
1976 Babergh District Council election
Party	Candidates	Seats	Gains	Losses	Net gain/loss	Seats %	Votes %	Votes	+/−
Conservative	22	17	9	0	▲9	44.7	44.4	11,873	+17.1
Independent	23	15	2	6	▼4	42.1	16.0	4,265	–19.8
Labour	16	4	0	7	▼7	10.5	28.8	7,686	–8.1
Liberal	2	1	1	0	▲1	2.6	7.6	2,036	N/A
Residents	2	1	1	0	▲1	0.0	3.2	860	N/A

== Ward results ==
Incumbent councillors standing for re-election are marked with an asterisk (*). Changes in seats do not take into account by-elections or defections.

=== Alton ===
Alton
Party	Candidate	Votes	%	±%
Conservative	F. Rundall	379	54.5	
Labour	R. Cook*	316	45.5	
Majority		63	9.1	
Turnout		695	63.0	
Registered electors		1,073		
Conservative gain from Labour		Swing		

=== Berners ===
Berners
Party	Candidate	Votes	%	±%
Independent	E. Pollard*	Unopposed		
Registered electors		1,280		
Independent hold				

=== Bildeston ===
Bildeston
Party	Candidate	Votes	%	±%
Independent	O. Simpson*	Unopposed		
Registered electors		1,196		
Independent hold				

=== Boxford ===
Boxford
Party	Candidate	Votes	%	±%
Independent	T. Clark*	Unopposed		
Registered electors		1,400		
Independent hold				

=== Brantham ===
Brantham
Party	Candidate	Votes	%	±%
Independent	H. Manning*	Unopposed		
Registered electors		1,437		
Independent hold				

=== Brett Vale ===
Brett Vale
Party	Candidate	Votes	%	±%
Conservative	E. Green	286	50.1	
Independent	H. Hardy	285	49.9	
Majority		1	0.2	
Turnout		571	48.9	
Registered electors		1,138		
Conservative gain from Independent		Swing		

=== Brookvale ===
Brookvale
Party	Candidate	Votes	%	±%
Independent	J. Baxter*	Unopposed		
Registered electors		1,509		
Independent hold				

=== Bures St. Mary ===
Bures St. Mary
Party	Candidate	Votes	%	±%
Conservative	H. Engleheart*	Unopposed		
Registered electors		1,150		
Conservative hold				

=== Capel & Wenham ===
Capel & Wenham
Party	Candidate	Votes	%	±%
Labour	R. Pearce*	485	50.4	
Conservative	W. Robertson	477	49.6	
Majority		8	0.8	
Turnout		962	49.1	
Registered electors		1,951		
Labour hold		Swing		

=== Chadacre ===
Chadacre
Party	Candidate	Votes	%	±%
Independent	C. Ince*	Unopposed		
Registered electors		1,455		
Independent hold				

=== Copdock ===
Copdock
Party	Candidate	Votes	%	±%
Independent	M. Moore*	382	53.7	
Labour	T. Carey	208	29.2	
Independent	R. Hitchcock	132	18.5	
Majority		174	24.5	
Turnout		712	58.7	
Registered electors		1,213		
Independent hold		Swing		

=== Dodnash ===
Dodnash (2 seats)
Party	Candidate	Votes	%	±%
Independent	C. Wake-Walker*	Unopposed		
Independent	T. Goodchild*	Unopposed		
Registered electors		2,724		
Independent hold				
Independent hold				

=== Elmsett ===
Elmsett
Party	Candidate	Votes	%	±%
Independent	W. Crockatt*	Unopposed		
Registered electors		1,175		
Independent hold				

=== Glemsford ===
Glemsford
Party	Candidate	Votes	%	±%
Conservative	A. Goodwin	528	66.4	
Labour	D. Chatters	274	34.5	
Majority		254	31.9	
Turnout		795	50.1	
Registered electors		1,587		
Conservative gain from Labour		Swing		

=== Great Cornard North ===
Great Cornard North (2 seats)
Party	Candidate	Votes	%	±%
Labour	M. Curran	342	49.7	
Conservative	S. Byham	334	48.5	
Labour	T. Macdonald	318	46.2	
Conservative	N. Scofield	277	40.3	
Turnout		~688	32.0	
Registered electors		2,150		
Labour hold				
Conservative gain from Labour				

=== Great Cornard South ===
Great Cornard South (2 seats)
Party	Candidate	Votes	%	±%
Conservative	A. Eady*	684	27.7	
Labour	E. Chaplin*	557	22.6	
Conservative	Peter Beer	548	22.2	
Labour	J. Blackie	500	20.3	
Turnout		~1,240	49.3	
Registered electors		2,501		
Conservative hold				
Labour hold				

=== Hadleigh ===
Hadleigh (3 seats)
Party	Candidate	Votes	%	±%
Labour	S. Brown*	923	22.6	
Independent	J. Osborne	733	18.0	
Independent	M. Crabtree	607	14.9	
Independent	C. Durrant	579	14.2	
Labour	N. Slade	510	12.5	
Labour	J. Whitehead*	506	12.4	
Conservative	C. Anstruther	378	9.3	
Conservative	J. Goad	307	7.5	
Turnout		~1,513	40.4	
Registered electors		4,024		
Labour hold				
Independent gain from Labour				
Independent gain from Labour				

=== Holbrook ===
Holbrook
Party	Candidate	Votes	%	±%
Independent	J. Godley*	Unopposed		
Registered electors		1,234		
Independent hold				

=== Lavenham ===
Lavenham
Party	Candidate	Votes	%	±%
Conservative	H. Griffin	423	60.9	
Independent	L. Spraggins*	272	39.1	
Majority		151	21.8	
Turnout		695	54.5	
Registered electors		1,254		
Conservative gain from Independent		Swing		

=== Leavenheath ===
Leavenheath
Party	Candidate	Votes	%	±%
Conservative	E. York*	Unopposed		
Registered electors		1,271		
Conservative hold				

=== Long Melford ===
Long Melford (2 seats)
Party	Candidate	Votes	%	±%
Liberal	R. Kemp*	1,152	45.3	
Residents	J. Abbott	622	24.5	
Independent	C. Kingston*	490	19.3	
Turnout		~1,132	25.5	
Registered electors		2,551		
Liberal gain from Independent				
Residents gain from Independent				

=== Nayland ===
Nayland
Party	Candidate	Votes	%	±%
Independent	D. Mitchell	364	57.8	
Independent	P. Hetherington*	266	42.2	
Majority		98	15.6	
Turnout		630	64.7	
Registered electors		916		
Independent hold		Swing		

=== No. 1 (Sudbury) ===
No. 1 (Sudbury) (5 seats)
Party	Candidate	Votes	%	±%
Conservative	W. Barker*	1,544	38.0	
Conservative	A. Moore	1,291	31.8	
Conservative	R. Playford*	1,278	31.5	
Conservative	G. Parker	992	24.4	
Conservative	H. Singh	948	23.4	
Liberal	J. Hewitt	884	21.8	
Labour	H. Banham*	765	18.8	
Labour	P. Moulton*	700	17.2	
Labour	S. Gargiulo	509	12.5	
Labour	R. Tanner	476	11.7	
Turnout		~4,059	59.3	
Registered electors		6,847		
Conservative hold				
Conservative hold				
Conservative hold				
Conservative gain from Labour				
Conservative gain from Labour				

=== North Cosford ===
North Cosford
Party	Candidate	Votes	%	±%
Independent	D. Hodge*	Unopposed		
Registered electors		1,145		
Independent hold				

=== Polstead & Layham ===
Polstead & Layham
Party	Candidate	Votes	%	±%
Conservative	R. Esler	326	67.8	
Independent	C. Stewart	97	20.2	
Independent	C. Edmunds	58	12.1	
Majority		229	47.6	
Turnout		481	52.8	
Registered electors		968		
Conservative hold		Swing		

=== Shotley ===
Shotley
Party	Candidate	Votes	%	±%
Conservative	T. Lloyd*	239	50.1	
Residents	J. Green	238	49.9	
Majority		1	0.2	
Turnout		477	38.0	
Registered electors		1,254		
Conservative gain from Independent		Swing		

=== Waldingfield ===
Waldingfield
Party	Candidate	Votes	%	±%
Conservative	C. Spence	634	68.1	
Labour	D. King	297	31.9	
Majority		337	36.2	
Turnout		931	46.1	
Registered electors		1,970		
Conservative gain from Independent		Swing		

=== West Samford ===
West Samford
Party	Candidate	Votes	%	±%
Conservative	D. Wedgwood*	Unopposed		
Registered electors		1,147		
Conservative hold				
