= 1976 Maldon District Council election =

1976 English local election

- 6 May 1976

All 30 seats to Maldon District Council 16 seats needed for a majority

	First party	Second party	Third party
Party	Conservative	Independent	Labour
Seats won	20	7	1
Seat change	▲9	▼4	▼3
Popular vote	22,439	5,714	7,768
Percentage	52.5%	14.0%	19.0%
Swing	▲17.9%	▼11.0%	▲0.8%
	Fourth party	Fifth party	Sixth party
Party	Independent Labour	Ind. Conservative	Liberal
Seats won	1	1	0
Seat change	Steady	▲1	▼3
Popular vote	1,338	424	4,154
Percentage	3.3%	1.0%	10.2%
Swing	▼0.7%	N/A	▼8.0%
Control before election
No overall control
Control after election
Conservative

The 1976 Maldon District Council election took place on 6 May 1976 to elect members of Maldon District Council in Essex, England. This was on the same day as other local elections.

== Summary ==
=== Election result ===
1976 Maldon District Council election
Party	Candidates	Seats	Gains	Losses	Net gain/loss	Seats %	Votes %	Votes	+/−
Conservative	26	20	9	0	▲9	66.7	52.5	21,439	+17.9
Independent	12	7	0	4	▼4	23.3	14.0	5,714	–11.0
Labour	13	1	0	3	▼3	3.3	19.0	7,768	+0.8
Independent Labour	1	1	0	0	Steady	3.3	3.3	1,338	–0.7
Ind. Conservative	1	1	1	0	▲1	3.3	1.0	424	N/A
Liberal	9	0	0	3	▼3	0.0	10.2	4,154	–8.0

== Ward results ==
Incumbent councillors standing for re-election are marked with an asterisk (*). Changes in seats do not take into account by-elections or defections.

=== Cold Norton ===
Cold Norton
Party	Candidate	Votes	%	±%
Independent	B. Board*	400	67.2	
Conservative	R. Ledger	195	32.8	
Majority		205	34.4	
Turnout		595	61.9	
Registered electors		964		
Independent hold		Swing		

=== Goldhanger ===
Goldhanger
Party	Candidate	Votes	%	±%
Conservative	H. Frost*	379	56.1	
Liberal	S. Kelly	296	43.9	
Majority		83	12.2	
Turnout		675	65.2	
Registered electors		1,037		
Conservative hold		Swing		

=== Great Totham ===
Great Totham (2 seats)
Party	Candidate	Votes	%	±%
Conservative	F. Anderson*	790	69.4	
Conservative	R. Bass*	789	69.3	
Independent	T. Lazell	368	32.3	
Turnout		~1,138	56.4	
Registered electors		2,018		
Conservative hold				
Conservative hold				

=== No. 1 (Maldon) ===
No. 1 (Maldon) (7 seats)
Party	Candidate	Votes	%	±%
Conservative	R. Daws*	1,858	55.4	
Conservative	C. Dowsett*	1,800	53.7	
Conservative	R. Pipe	1,632	48.7	
Conservative	D. Sewell*	1,622	48.4	
Conservative	K. Munnion	1,460	43.5	
Independent Labour	W. Hutchinson*	1,338	39.9	
Labour	G. Hughes*	1,315	39.2	
Conservative	C. Backus	1,234	36.8	
Conservative	K. Ward	1,207	36.0	
Labour	C. Tait	1,082	32.3	
Liberal	N. Smith*	978	29.2	
Labour	E. Bannister*	974	29.0	
Labour	P. Locke	807	24.1	
Labour	J. Lewis	758	22.6	
Labour	H. Salt	713	21.3	
Liberal	J. Finch	694	20.7	
Turnout		~3,353	43.6	
Registered electors		7,690		
Conservative hold				
Conservative hold				
Conservative gain from Labour				
Conservative hold				
Conservative gain from Liberal				
Independent Labour hold				
Labour hold				

=== No. 2 (Heybridge) ===
No. 2 (Heybridge) (3 seats)
Party	Candidate	Votes	%	±%
Conservative	R. May	554	37.9	
Conservative	D. Newell	498	34.0	
Conservative	R. Thomas	483	33.0	
Liberal	D. Scott	482	32.9	
Labour	P. Darney*	458	31.3	
Liberal	W. Fletcher	403	27.5	
Labour	A. Joyce	381	26.0	
Liberal	P. Mead	363	24.8	
Labour	D. Darney	335	22.9	
Turnout		~1,463	50.6	
Registered electors		2,892		
Conservative gain from Labour				
Conservative gain from Labour				
Conservative gain from Liberal				

=== No. 3 (Burnham-on-Crouch) ===
No. 3 (Burnham-on-Crouch) (4 seats)
Party	Candidate	Votes	%	±%
Independent	J. Dowding*	1,174	51.7	
Independent	S. Hull	1,140	50.2	
Conservative	M. Wood	1,063	46.8	
Conservative	M. Freeman*	1,052	46.3	
Conservative	V. Cowperthwaite	768	33.8	
Conservative	A. Brown	565	24.9	
Independent	J. Sharp	558	24.6	
Independent	E. Samuel*	477	21.0	
Labour	J. Kendall	313	13.8	
Labour	E. Cottis	257	11.3	
Turnout		~2,272	51.6	
Registered electors		4,404		
Independent hold				
Independent hold				
Conservative gain from Independent				
Conservative gain from Independent				

=== No. 7 (Althorne & Mayland) ===
No. 7 (Althorne & Mayland)
Party	Candidate	Votes	%	±%
Independent	D. Abernethy*	451	52.8	
Conservative	A. Mayhew	403	47.2	
Majority		48	5.6	
Turnout		854	57.2	
Registered electors		1,496		
Independent hold		Swing		

=== No. 8 (Latchingdon) ===
No. 8 (Latchingdon)
Party	Candidate	Votes	%	±%
Conservative	D. Heritage*	372	56.5	
Independent	R. Cole	207	31.5	
Labour	J. Roberts	79	12.0	
Majority		165	25.0	
Turnout		658	60.2	
Registered electors		1,100		
Conservative hold		Swing		

=== Purleigh ===
Purleigh
Party	Candidate	Votes	%	±%
Independent	G. Barber*	334	62.2	
Liberal	J. De Grey Warter	203	37.8	
Majority		131	24.4	
Turnout		537	49.8	
Registered electors		1,080		
Independent hold		Swing		

=== Southminster ===
Southminster (2 seats)
Party	Candidate	Votes	%	±%
Ind. Conservative	D. Fisher*	424	54.6	
Conservative	J. Cottam	397	51.1	
Liberal	C. Kelly*	373	48.0	
Turnout		~776	36.0	
Registered electors		2,156		
Ind. Conservative gain from Independent				
Conservative gain from Liberal				

=== St. Lawrence ===
St. Lawrence
Party	Candidate	Votes	%	±%
Conservative	R. Sennitt*	Unopposed		
Registered electors		788		
Conservative gain from Independent				

=== Tillingham & Bradwell ===
Tillingham & Bradwell
Party	Candidate	Votes	%	±%
Independent	W. Proctor	Unopposed		
Registered electors		1,240		
Independent hold				

=== Tollesbury ===
Tollesbury (2 seats)
Party	Candidate	Votes	%	±%
Conservative	J. Madden*	637	55.2	
Conservative	G. Butt*	535	46.4	
Labour	J. Young	296	25.6	
Turnout		~904	51.3	
Registered electors		1,763		
Conservative hold				
Conservative hold				

=== Tolleshunt D'Arcy ===
Tolleshunt D'Arcy
Party	Candidate	Votes	%	±%
Conservative	E. Peel*	454	78.4	
Independent	W. Bathe	125	21.6	
Majority		329	56.8	
Turnout		579	44.1	
Registered electors		1,323		
Conservative hold		Swing		

=== Wickham Bishops ===
Wickham Bishops
Party	Candidate	Votes	%	±%
Conservative	L. Bass*	463	56.1	
Liberal	K. Spratley	362	43.9	
Majority		101	12.2	
Turnout		825	62.5	
Registered electors		1,321		
Conservative hold		Swing		

=== Woodham ===
Woodham
Party	Candidate	Votes	%	±%
Independent	P. Herrmann*	480	67.7	
Conservative	B. Chalk	229	32.3	
Majority		251	35.4	
Turnout		709	60.6	
Registered electors		1,170		
Independent hold		Swing		
