= 1976 Castle Point District Council election =

1976 English local government election

- 6 May 1976

All 39 seats to Castle Point District Council 20 seats needed for a majority

	First party	Second party
Party	Conservative	Labour
Seats won	36	3
Seat change	▲17	▼17
Popular vote	53,653	20,920
Percentage	67.2%	26.2%
Swing	▲14.7%	▼19.0%
Council control before election
Labour
Council control after election
Conservative

The 1976 Castle Point District Council election took place on 6 May 1976 to elect members of Castle Point District Council in Essex, England. This was on the same day as other local elections.

== Summary ==
=== Election result ===
1976 Castle Point District Council election
Party	Candidates	Seats	Gains	Losses	Net gain/loss	Seats %	Votes %	Votes	+/−
Conservative	39	36			▲17	92.3	67.2	53,653	+14.7
Labour	33	3			▼17	7.7	26.2	20,920	–19.0
Liberal	8	0			Steady	0.0	4.9	3,948	N/A
Independent Labour	3	0			Steady	0.0	1.7	1,338	+0.8
