= 1976 Tendring District Council election =

1976 UK local government election

- 6 May 1976

All 60 seats to Tendring District Council 31 seats needed for a majority

	First party	Second party	Third party
Party	Conservative	Independent	Liberal
Last election	31 seats, 43.9%	11 seats, 7.8%	4 seats, 11.0%
Seats won	39	9	5
Seat change	▲8	▼2	▲1
Popular vote	33,118	8,964	6,991
Percentage	52.0%	9.4%	11.0%
Swing	▲8.1%	▲1.6%	▲5.2%
	Fourth party	Fifth party
Party	Residents	Labour
Last election	3 seats, 6.4%	11 seats, 20.9%
Seats won	4	3
Seat change	▲1	▼8
Popular vote	4,038	13,336
Percentage	6.3%	20.9%
Swing	▼0.1%	▼14.8%
- Winner of each seat at the 1976 Tendring District Council election.
Council control before election
Conservative
Council control after election
Conservative

The 1976 Tendring District Council election took place on 6 May 1976 to elect members of Tendring District Council in England. This was the same day as other local elections held across the United Kingdom.

== Summary ==
=== Election result ===
1976 Tendring District Council election
Party	Candidates	Seats	Gains	Losses	Net gain/loss	Seats %	Votes %	Votes	+/−
Conservative	49	39	N/A	N/A	▲8	65.0	52.0	33,118	+8.1
Independent	15	9	N/A	N/A	▼2	15.0	9.4	5,964	+1.6
Liberal	16	5	N/A	N/A	▲1	8.3	10.7	6,775	+4.9
Residents	4	4	N/A	N/A	▲1	6.7	6.3	4,038	±0.0
Labour	36	3	N/A	N/A	▼8	5.0	20.9	13,336	–14.7
Ratepayer	1	0	N/A	N/A	Steady	0.0	0.5	297	N/A

== Ward results ==
=== Alresford, Thorrington & Frating ===
Alresford, Thorrington & Frating (2 seats)
Party	Candidate	Votes	%
Conservative	R. Grinsted	721	47.2
Independent	D. Fitch	617	40.4
Independent	A. Shelton	513	33.6
Labour	S. Wayman	189	12.4
Labour	M. Snell	186	12.2
Turnout		~1,527	60.7
Registered electors		2,516	
Conservative win (new seat)			
Independent win (new seat)			

=== Ardleigh ===
Ardleigh
Party	Candidate	Votes	%
Conservative	P. Moorhouse	Unopposed	
Registered electors		1,426	
Conservative win (new seat)			

=== Beaumont & Thorpe ===
Beaumont & Thorpe
Party	Candidate	Votes	%
Independent	M. Wright	578	82.7
Labour	M. Lee	121	17.3
Majority		457	65.4
Turnout		699	44.7
Registered electors		1,565	
Independent win (new seat)			

=== Bockings Elm ===
Bockings Elm (2 seats)
Party	Candidate	Votes	%
Conservative	P. Price	704	62.2
Conservative	W. Graver	621	54.9
Liberal	C. Cuddehay	449	39.7
Labour	F. White	254	22.5
Labour	L. Larkin	234	20.7
Turnout		~1,131	42.4
Registered electors		3,315	
Conservative win (new seat)			
Conservative win (new seat)			

=== Bradfield, Wrabness & Wix ===
Bradfield, Wrabness & Wix
Party	Candidate	Votes	%
Conservative	D. Turberville	Unopposed	
Registered electors		1,528	
Conservative win (new seat)			

=== Brightlingsea East ===
Brightlingsea East (2 seats)
Party	Candidate	Votes	%
Independent	P. Patrick	578	48.8
Liberal	C. House	449	37.9
Liberal	W. Addison	338	28.5
Conservative	R. Hodgkinson	290	24.5
Labour	G. Conway	263	22.2
Conservative	E. Lomax	227	19.1
Labour	A. Smith	226	19.1
Turnout		~1,186	56.1
Registered electors		2,815	
Independent win (new seat)			
Liberal win (new seat)			

=== Brightlingsea West ===
Brightlingsea West (2 seats)
Party	Candidate	Votes	%
Liberal	E. Price	512	44.3
Liberal	B. Stephens	465	40.3
Conservative	W. Bottomley	410	35.5
Labour	M. Dutton	339	29.4
Conservative	B. Pingree	320	27.7
Labour	R. Barlow	264	22.9
Turnout		~1,155	44.7
Registered electors		2,819	
Liberal win (new seat)			
Liberal win (new seat)			

=== Elmstead ===
Elmstead
Party	Candidate	Votes	%
Conservative	L. Parrish	525	73.0
Labour	J. Bartington	194	27.0
Majority		331	46.0
Turnout		719	48.8
Registered electors		1,478	
Conservative win (new seat)			

=== Frinton ===
Frinton (3 seats)
Party	Candidate	Votes	%
Conservative	J. Humphrey	1,289	69.3
Conservative	P. Leaman	1,215	65.4
Conservative	A. Morgan	1,088	58.5
Liberal	J. Russell	572	30.8
Turnout		1,859	43.2
Registered electors		4,303	
Conservative win (new seat)			
Conservative win (new seat)			
Conservative win (new seat)			

=== Golf Green ===
Golf Green (2 seats)
Party	Candidate	Votes	%
Conservative	P. Harding	834	68.7
Conservative	J. Hill	814	67.1
Labour	W. Lane	380	31.3
Labour	D. Taylor	348	28.7
Turnout		~1,214	39.9
Registered electors		3,042	
Conservative win (new seat)			
Conservative win (new seat)			

=== Great & Little Oakley ===
Great & Little Oakley
Party	Candidate	Votes	%
Conservative	F. Aylmore	Unopposed	
Registered electors		1,420	
Conservative win (new seat)			

=== Great Bentley ===
Great Bentley
Party	Candidate	Votes	%
Conservative	G. Lord	506	64.3
Liberal	R. Varnarva	281	35.7
Majority		225	28.6
Turnout		787	47.7
Registered electors		1,651	
Conservative win (new seat)			

=== Great Bromley, Little Bromley & Little Bentley ===
Great Bromley, Little Bromley & Little Bentley
Party	Candidate	Votes	%
Conservative	C. Pirie	Unopposed	
Registered electors		1,052	
Conservative win (new seat)			

=== Harwich East ===
Harwich East (2 seats)
Party	Candidate	Votes	%
Conservative	F. Good	1,061	84.5
Independent	W. Howlett	735	58.5
Labour	G. Powley	376	29.9
Liberal	T. Walker	340	27.1
Turnout		~1,256	43.3
Registered electors		2,903	
Conservative win (new seat)			
Independent win (new seat)			

=== Harwich East Central ===
Harwich East Central (2 seats)
Party	Candidate	Votes	%
Conservative	G. Potter	822	85.4
Conservative	A. Thorn	732	76.1
Labour	W. Turner	370	38.5
Turnout		~962	44.4
Registered electors		2,686	
Conservative win (new seat)			
Conservative win (new seat)			

=== Harwich West ===
Harwich West (2 seats)
Party	Candidate	Votes	%
Conservative	P. Vanner	752	51.6
Labour	R. Knight	722	49.5
Conservative	W. Hawken	687	47.1
Labour	P. McCurry	465	31.9
Turnout		~1,458	51.6
Registered electors		2,858	
Conservative win (new seat)			
Labour win (new seat)			

=== Harwich West Central ===
Harwich West Central (2 seats)
Party	Candidate	Votes	%
Conservative	T. Wallington-Rutson	757	65.2
Conservative	G. Hayes	688	59.3
Labour	T. Rogers	404	34.8
Turnout		~1,161	40.7
Registered electors		2,852	
Conservative win (new seat)			
Conservative win (new seat)			

=== Haven ===
Haven (2 seats)
Party	Candidate	Votes	%
Residents	C. Bufton	1,009	49.9
Residents	J. Hewitt	877	43.4
Conservative	C. Bedeman	580	28.7
Ratepayer	C. Clowes	297	14.7
Labour	W. Sweetland	135	6.7
Turnout		~2,021	75.4
Registered electors		2,680	
Residents win (new seat)			
Residents win (new seat)			

=== Holland & Kirby ===
Holland & Kirby (2 seats)
Party	Candidate	Votes	%
Conservative	F. Rust	Unopposed	
Conservative	J. Divall	Unopposed	
Registered electors		3,210	
Conservative win (new seat)			
Conservative win (new seat)			

=== Lawford & Manningtree ===
Lawford & Manningtree (2 seats)
Party	Candidate	Votes	%
Conservative	R. Fairley	742	50.9
Labour	L. Randall	742	50.9
Labour	R. Norton	618	42.4
Conservative	L. Faircloth	599	41.1
Liberal	R. Smith	216	14.8
Turnout		~1,459	69.0
Registered electors		2,464	
Conservative win (new seat)			
Labour win (new seat)			

=== Little Clacton ===
Little Clacton
Party	Candidate	Votes	%
Independent	A. Chappell	Unopposed	
Registered electors		1,828	
Independent win (new seat)			

=== Mistley ===
Mistley
Party	Candidate	Votes	%
Conservative	H. French	261	40.5
Liberal	L. Brown	228	35.4
Labour	A. Foster	155	24.1
Majority		33	5.1
Turnout		644	48.1
Registered electors		1,339	
Conservative win (new seat)			

=== Ramsey & Parkeston ===
Ramsey & Parkeston
Party	Candidate	Votes	%
Independent	F. Wilkinson	297	38.9
Independent	D. Masterson	198	26.0
Liberal	P. Main	141	18.5
Labour	R. Smith	127	16.6
Majority		99	12.9
Turnout		763	50.5
Registered electors		1,511	
Independent win (new seat)			

=== Rush Green ===
Rush Green (3 seats)
Party	Candidate	Votes	%
Conservative	H. Harvey-Williams	769	43.4
Conservative	J. Gasking	680	38.4
Conservative	M. Watson	640	36.1
Labour	A. Markham-Lee	540	30.5
Labour	P. Hicks	482	27.2
Liberal	J. Snow	465	26.2
Labour	P. Ward	463	26.1
Liberal	C. Palmer	396	22.3
Turnout		~1,772	42.7
Registered electors		4,151	
Conservative win (new seat)			
Conservative win (new seat)			
Conservative win (new seat)			

=== Southcliff ===
Southcliff (3 seats)
Party	Candidate	Votes	%
Conservative	L. Cox	1,397	81.7
Conservative	E. Herbert	1,371	80.1
Conservative	L. King	1,251	73.1
Labour	D. Ball	313	18.3
Turnout		~1,711	40.2
Registered electors		4,256	
Conservative win (new seat)			
Conservative win (new seat)			
Conservative win (new seat)			

=== St Bartholomews ===
St Bartholomews (2 seats)
Party	Candidate	Votes	%
Residents	M. Holloway	1,078	74.1
Residents	E. Frost	1,074	73.8
Conservative	C. Jessop	488	33.6
Labour	F. Merrin	141	9.7
Independent	G. Collins	128	8.8
Turnout		~1,455	65.0
Registered electors		2,823	
Residents win (new seat)			
Residents win (new seat)			

=== St James ===
St James (3 seats)
Party	Candidate	Votes	%
Conservative	A. Overton	1,022	71.0
Conservative	J. Goldsmith	985	68.4
Conservative	J. Winer	959	66.6
Labour	L. Robertson	419	29.1
Turnout		~1,440	31.0
Registered electors		4,644	
Conservative win (new seat)			
Conservative win (new seat)			
Conservative win (new seat)			

=== St Johns ===
St Johns (3 seats)
Party	Candidate	Votes	%
Conservative	B. Edwards	716	33.3
Conservative	T. Staigl	621	28.8
Liberal	P. Bevan	559	26.0
Labour	L. Smith	544	25.3
Labour	A. Oswick	534	24.8
Labour	D. Mills	527	24.5
Liberal	P. Towns	501	23.3
Liberal	G. Townley	476	22.1
Independent	T. Jeffrey	335	15.6
Independent	D. Triolo	230	10.7
Independent	H. Treloar	187	8.7
Turnout		~2,153	47.8
Registered electors		4,504	
Conservative win (new seat)			
Conservative win (new seat)			
Liberal win (new seat)			

=== St Marys ===
St Marys (3 seats)
Party	Candidate	Votes	%
Independent	D. Moodey	672	38.0
Liberal	D. Rhodes	603	34.1
Labour	S. Gilbert	495	28.0
Labour	T. Larkin	460	26.0
Labour	K. Langsdon	454	25.7
Turnout		~1,770	45.1
Registered electors		3,924	
Independent win (new seat)			
Liberal win (new seat)			
Labour win (new seat)			

=== St Osyth & Point Clear ===
St Osyth & Point Clear (2 seats)
Party	Candidate	Votes	%
Independent	J. Smith	632	64.9
Conservative	H. Ashenden	550	56.5
Conservative	F. Ford	501	51.5
Independent	L. Stanley	264	27.1
Turnout		~974	45.3
Registered electors		2,610	
Independent win (new seat)			
Conservative win (new seat)			

=== Tendring & Weeley ===
Tendring & Weeley
Party	Candidate	Votes	%
Conservative	F. Everitt	Unopposed	
Registered electors		1,817	
Conservative win (new seat)			

=== Walton ===
Walton (3 seats)
Party	Candidate	Votes	%
Conservative	A. Rayner	1,349	76.1
Conservative	E. Day	1,294	73.0
Conservative	J. Douglass	1,280	72.2
Labour	B. Read	426	24.0
Labour	S. Grant	426	24.0
Turnout		~1,774	36.6
Registered electors		4,846	
Conservative win (new seat)			
Conservative win (new seat)			
Conservative win (new seat)			
