= 1976 Fylde Borough Council election =

Election

- 6 May 1976

All 47 seats to Fylde Borough Council 26 seats needed for a majority

	First party	Second party	Third party
Party	Conservative	Labour	Independent
Last election	30	2	19
Seats won	25	1	20
Seat change	▼5	▼1	▲1
Popular vote	27,711	2,038	3,712
	Fourth party	Fifth party	Sixth party
Party	Liberal	Residents	Ind. Conservative
Last election	0
Seats won	5	7	2
Seat change	▲5	▲5	▲2
Popular vote	5,701	8,199	457
Leader before election
Conservative
Leader after election
Conservative

The 1976 Fylde Borough Council election took place on 6 May 1976. This was on the same day as other local elections in England.

== Election result ==
1976 Fylde Borough Council
Party	Candidates	Seats	Gains	Losses	Net gain/loss	Seats %	Votes %	Votes	+/−
Conservative	36	25	2	7	▼5			27,711	
Labour	4	1	0	0	▼1			2,038	
Independent	10	7	1	2	▼1			3,712	
Liberal	7	5	1	0	▲1			5,701	
Residents	8	7	5	0	▲5			8,199	
Ind. Conservative	2	2	2	0	▲2			457	

== Ward Results ==
=== Ansdell ===
Ansdell (3 seats)
Party	Candidate	Votes	%	±%
Conservative	Tavernor J.	1,027	30.6	
Liberal	Woodhouse P.	893	26.6	
Residents	Fletcher E.	788	23.5	
Conservative	Gibson M. Ms.	756		
Conservative	Nicholson S.	729		
Independent	Baron J.	652	19.4	
Turnout		4,845	57.7	
Conservative hold				
Liberal hold				
Residents gain from Conservative				

=== Ashton ===
Ashton (3 seats)
Party	Candidate	Votes	%	±%
Residents	Sturrock U. Ms.	1,013	51.8	
Conservative	Nicoll P.	942	48.2	
Conservative	Dobson H.	877		
Conservative	Nuttall H.	716		
Turnout		3,548	51.8	
Residents gain from Conservative				
Conservative hold				
Conservative hold				

=== Bryning With Warton ===
Bryning With Warton (2 seats)
Party	Candidate	Votes	%	±%
Liberal	Howorth D.	Unopposed		
Independent	Rigby W.	Unopposed		
Turnout		0	0.0	
Liberal hold				
Independent hold				

=== Central ===
Central (3 seats)
Party	Candidate	Votes	%	±%
Conservative	Jordan F.	886	40.5	
Conservative	Middleton A. Ms.	856		
Conservative	Utley N.	773		
Residents	Hoyle F.	753	34.5	
Liberal	Barnes M.	546	25.0	
Turnout		3,814	43.1	
Conservative hold				
Conservative hold				
Conservative hold				

=== Clifton ===
Clifton (3 seats)
Party	Candidate	Votes	%	±%
Conservative	Thompson W.	979	34.6	
Conservative	Hodgson C. Ms.	914		
Residents	Henshall D.	884	31.2	
Liberal	Warren W.	749	26.4	
Conservative	Fulford-Brown R.	701		
National Front	Thompson E.	220	7.8	
Turnout		4,447	53.7	
Conservative hold				
Conservative hold				
Residents gain from Conservative				

=== Elswick & Little Eccleston ===
Elswick & Little Eccleston (1 seat)
Party	Candidate	Votes	%	±%
Independent	Glover R.	281	63.3	
Independent	Rock S.	163	36.7	
Turnout		444	59.3	
Independent hold				

=== Fairhaven ===
Fairhaven (3 seats)
Party	Candidate	Votes	%	±%
Conservative	Cartmell H.	1,047	50.4	
Residents	Wilding J. Ms.	1,030	49.6	
Conservative	Gouldbourn J.	882		
Conservative	Caldwell G.	761		
Turnout		3,720	48.0	
Conservative hold				
Residents gain from Conservative				
Conservative hold				

=== Freckleton East ===
Freckleton East (2 seats)
Party	Candidate	Votes	%	±%
Conservative	Payne J.	589	66.4	
Conservative	Spencer R.	586		
Independent	Dowling M. Ms.	298	33.6	
Turnout		1,473	54.2	
Conservative win (new seat)				
Conservative win (new seat)				

=== Freckleton West ===
Freckleton West (2 seats)
Party	Candidate	Votes	%	±%
Conservative	Whittle B.	644	43.2	
Independent	Rigby L.	526	35.3	
Independent	Baxter B.	348		
Labour	Garth H.	320	21.5	
Conservative	Gee R.	312		
Independent	Burgess Y. Ms.	74		
Turnout		2,224	60.0	
Conservative win (new seat)				
Independent win (new seat)				

=== Heyhouses ===
Heyhouses (3 seats)
Party	Candidate	Votes	%	±%
Residents	Bennett A.	1,294	41.9	
Liberal	Greene W.	1,076	34.9	
Conservative	Mason J. Ms.	716	23.2	
Conservative	Knight A.	684		
Conservative	Williamson R.	612		
Turnout		4,382	48.8	
Residents gain from Conservative				
Liberal gain from Conservative				
Conservative hold				

=== Kilnhouse ===
Kilnhouse (3 seats)
Party	Candidate	Votes	%	±%
Residents	Lane J.	1,764	53.9	
Conservative	Joyce R.	936	28.6	
Conservative	Cowburn H.	729		
Conservative	Boothroyd J. Ms.	568		
Labour	Horridge N.	441	13.5	
Labour	Mobbs M. Ms.	433		
National Front	Kay J. Ms.	129	3.9	
Turnout		5,000	60.0	
Residents win (new seat)				
Conservative win (new seat)				
Conservative win (new seat)				

=== Kirkham North ===
Kirkham North (2 seats)
Party	Candidate	Votes	%	±%
Residents	Fisher R.	Unopposed		
Conservative	Aiken O.	Unopposed		
Turnout		0	0.0	
Residents win (new seat)				
Conservative win (new seat)				

=== Kirkham South ===
Kirkham South (2 seats)
Party	Candidate	Votes	%	±%
Ind. Conservative	Bennett J.	Unopposed		
Conservative	Hall P.	Unopposed		
Turnout		0	0.0	
Ind. Conservative win (new seat)				
Conservative win (new seat)				

=== Medlar-With-Wesham ===
Medlar-With-Wesham (2 seats)
Party	Candidate	Votes	%	±%
Independent	Bamber G.	Unopposed		
Independent	Bamber G.	Unopposed		
Turnout		0	0.0	
Independent hold				
Independent hold				

=== Newton & Treales ===
Newton & Treales (2 seats)
Party	Candidate	Votes	%	±%
Conservative	Hall M. Ms.	778	60.1	
Conservative	Braithwaite J.	730		
Independent	Allan N.	517	39.9	
Turnout		2,025	58.3	
Conservative gain from Independent				
Conservative gain from Independent				

=== Park ===
Park (3 seats)
Party	Candidate	Votes	%	±%
Liberal	Woodhouse J. Ms.	1,047	52.4	
Conservative	Hickman A.	952	47.6	
Conservative	Jealous A.	877		
Conservative	Barnes S. Ms.	871		
Turnout		3,747	51.6	
Liberal win (new seat)				
Conservative win (new seat)				
Conservative win (new seat)				

=== Ribby With Wrea ===
Ribby With Wrea (1 seat)
Party	Candidate	Votes	%	±%
Independent	Warbrick G.	Unopposed		
Turnout		0	0.0	
Independent hold				

=== Singleton & Greenhalgh ===
Singleton & Greenhalgh (1 seat)
Party	Candidate	Votes	%	±%
Independent	Loftus W.	Unopposed		
Turnout		0	0.0	
Independent win (new seat)				

=== St. Johns ===
St. Johns (3 seats)
Party	Candidate	Votes	%	±%
Conservative	Lloyd J.	876	36.6	
Labour	Callow W.	844	35.3	
Conservative	Bamber E.	784		
Residents	Byrom E. Ms.	673	28.1	
Conservative	Hayhurst M. Ms.	642		
Turnout		3,819	56.9	
Conservative hold				
Labour hold				
Conservative hold				

=== St. Leonards ===
St. Leonards (3 seats)
Party	Candidate	Votes	%	±%
Conservative	Crossland J.	802	35.0	
Independent	White H.	783	34.2	
Liberal	Jenkins T.	705	30.8	
Liberal	Blackwood D. Ms.	685		
Conservative	Stephens J.	628		
Conservative	Tetlock C.	549		
Turnout		4,152	48.9	
Conservative hold				
Independent gain from Conservative				
Liberal hold				

=== Staining ===
Staining (1 seat)
Party	Candidate	Votes	%	±%
Independent	Stott C.	Unopposed		
Turnout		0	0.0	
Independent hold				

=== Weeton & Westby ===
Weeton & Westby (1 seat)
Party	Candidate	Votes	%	±%
Ind. Conservative	Bradley G.	457	86.7	
Independent	Kirkham D.	70	13.3	
Turnout		527	50.2	
Ind. Conservative win (new seat)				
