= 1976 Mid Suffolk District Council election =

UK local election

- 6 May 1976

All 40 seats to Mid Suffolk District Council 21 seats needed for a majority

	First party	Second party
Party	Independent	Conservative
Seats won	19	13
Seat change	▼5	▲7
Popular vote	6,597	4,660
Percentage	29.4%	20.7%
Swing	▲6.1%	▲8.2%
	Third party	Fourth party
Party	Labour	Liberal
Seats won	6	2
Seat change	▼3	▲1
Popular vote	7,798	3,418
Percentage	34.7%	15.2%
Swing	▼15.4%	▲6.9%
Council control before election
Independent
Council control after election
No overall control

The 1976 Mid Suffolk District Council election took place on 6 May 1976 to elect members of Mid Suffolk District Council in Suffolk, England. This was on the same day as other local elections.

== Summary ==
=== Election result ===
1976 Mid Suffolk District Council election
Party	Candidates	Seats	Gains	Losses	Net gain/loss	Seats %	Votes %	Votes	+/−
Independent	25	19	3	8	▼5	47.5	29.4	6,597	+6.1
Conservative	14	13	8	1	▲7	32.5	20.7	4,660	+8.2
Labour	21	6	0	3	▼3	15.0	34.7	7,798	–15.4
Liberal	5	2	1	0	▲1	5.0	15.2	3,418	+6.9

== Ward results ==
Incumbent councillors standing for re-election are marked with an asterisk (*). Changes in seats do not take into account by-elections or defections.

=== Barham ===
Barham
Party	Candidate	Votes	%	±%
Conservative	J. Macrow*	490	86.7	
Labour	P. Koppel	75	13.3	
Majority		415	73.4	
Turnout		565	44.7	
Registered electors		1,265		
Conservative gain from Independent		Swing		

=== Claydon ===
Claydon
Party	Candidate	Votes	%	±%
Independent	H. Griffiths	Unopposed		
Registered electors		1,082		
Independent hold				

=== Creeting ===
Creeting
Party	Candidate	Votes	%	±%
Independent	J. Ward*	Unopposed		
Registered electors		1,049		
Independent hold				

=== Debenham ===
Debenham
Party	Candidate	Votes	%	±%
Conservative	R. Glass*	449	74.2	
Labour	A. Higgins	156	25.8	
Majority		293	48.4	
Turnout		605	47.9	
Registered electors		1,264		
Conservative hold		Swing		

=== Elmswell ===
Elmswell
Party	Candidate	Votes	%	±%
Independent	D. Dyball*	464	86.2	
Labour	B. Britton	74	13.8	
Majority		390	72.4	
Turnout		538	38.5	
Registered electors		1,396		
Independent hold		Swing		

=== Eye ===
Eye
Party	Candidate	Votes	%	±%
Independent	C. Flatman*	514	75.9	
Independent	M. Butterworth	163	24.1	
Majority		351	51.8	
Turnout		677	49.5	
Registered electors		1,367		
Independent gain from Labour		Swing		

=== Fressingfield ===
Fressingfield
Party	Candidate	Votes	%	±%
Conservative	E. Rice	Unopposed		
Registered electors		1,148		
Conservative gain from Independent				

=== Gislingham ===
Gislingham
Party	Candidate	Votes	%	±%
Independent	P. Watson*	Unopposed		
Registered electors		1,301		
Independent hold				

=== Haughley & Wetherden ===
Haughley & Wetherden
Party	Candidate	Votes	%	±%
Labour	E. Crascall*	Unopposed		
Registered electors		1,235		
Labour hold				

=== Helmingham ===
Helmingham
Party	Candidate	Votes	%	±%
Independent	R. Willsher*	372	83.4	
Independent	J. Finch	74	16.6	
Majority		298	66.8	
Turnout		446	41.6	
Registered electors		1,071		
Independent hold		Swing		

=== Hoxne ===
Hoxne
Party	Candidate	Votes	%	±%
Conservative	G. McGregor	Unopposed		
Registered electors		1,181		
Conservative hold				

=== Mendlesham ===
Mendlesham
Party	Candidate	Votes	%	±%
Independent	A. Braybrooke*	Unopposed		
Registered electors		1,285		
Independent hold				

=== Needham Market ===
Needham Market
Party	Candidate	Votes	%	±%
Conservative	J. Swain*	633	64.3	
Labour	P. Carter	351	35.7	
Majority		282	28.6	
Turnout		984	51.7	
Registered electors		1,903		
Conservative hold		Swing		

=== No. 2 (Stowmarket) ===
No. 2 (Stowmarket) (6 seats)
Party	Candidate	Votes	%	±%
Independent	G. Brewster	1,286	30.5	
Independent	R. Pattle*	1,129	26.8	
Liberal	F. Brooke*	1,104	26.2	
Labour	R. Jones*	1,034	24.5	
Labour	E. Jones*	945	22.4	
Labour	P. Oldfield	930	22.1	
Conservative	G. Packer	797	18.9	
Liberal	A. Ashton	783	18.6	
Labour	C. Soames	779	18.5	
Labour	R. Hiron*	775	18.4	
Labour	E. Nunn	714	16.9	
Liberal	B. Hewitt	628	14.9	
Turnout		~4,996	59.5	
Registered electors		7,093		
Independent gain from Labour				
Independent hold				
Liberal hold				
Labour hold				
Labour hold				
Labour hold				

=== No. 5 (Ringshall) ===
No. 5 (Ringshall)
Party	Candidate	Votes	%	±%
Independent	H. Crooks*	427	84.6	
Labour	A. Winchester	78	15.4	
Majority		349	69.2	
Turnout		505	45.1	
Registered electors		1,120		
Independent hold		Swing		

=== No. 7 (Barking) ===
No. 7 (Barking)
Party	Candidate	Votes	%	±%
Independent	P. Chapman	Unopposed		
Registered electors		1,173		
Independent hold				

=== No. 8 (Somersham) ===
No. 8 (Somersham)
Party	Candidate	Votes	%	±%
Independent	S. Keyte*	Unopposed		
Registered electors		1,259		
Independent hold				

=== No. 9 (Bramford) ===
No. 9 (Bramford)
Party	Candidate	Votes	%	±%
Labour	G. Cunningham	Unopposed		
Registered electors		1,733		
Labour hold				

=== No. 16 (Stowupland) ===
No. 16 (Stowupland) (2 seats)
Party	Candidate	Votes	%	±%
Liberal	S. Wilson	642	50.1	
Labour	A. Addison*	639	49.9	
Labour	M. Shave*	600	46.9	
Turnout		~1,281	63.9	
Registered electors		2,004		
Liberal gain from Labour				
Labour hold				

=== No. 26 (Bacton) ===
No. 26 (Bacton)
Party	Candidate	Votes	%	±%
Conservative	B. Beak	Unopposed		
Registered electors		1,207		
Conservative gain from Independent				

=== No. 28 (Walsham-le-Willows) ===
No. 28 (Walsham-le-Willows)
Party	Candidate	Votes	%	±%
Conservative	S. Edwards*	406	85.7	
Labour	D. Pearce	68	14.3	
Majority		338	71.4	
Turnout		474	51.7	
Registered electors		916		
Conservative hold		Swing		

=== No. 29 (Badwell Ash) ===
No. 29 (Badwell Ash)
Party	Candidate	Votes	%	±%
Independent	H. Linn*	Unopposed		
Registered electors		965		
Independent hold				

=== No. 33 (Woolpit) ===
No. 33 (Woolpit)
Party	Candidate	Votes	%	±%
Conservative	P. Maitland	438	55.7	
Independent	M. Wood	246	31.3	
Labour	R. Humphrey	103	13.1	
Majority		192	24.4	
Turnout		787	59.3	
Registered electors		1,328		
Conservative gain from Independent		Swing		

=== No. 34 (Rattlesden) ===
No. 34 (Rattlesden)
Party	Candidate	Votes	%	±%
Conservative	L. Muir*	209	53.2	
Independent	D. Cole	184	46.8	
Majority		25	6.4	
Turnout		393	41.1	
Registered electors		957		
Conservative hold		Swing		

=== Norton ===
Norton
Party	Candidate	Votes	%	±%
Conservative	B. Siffleete	322	53.6	
Independent	A. Henderson	279	46.4	
Majority		43	7.2	
Turnout		601	40.9	
Registered electors		1,469		
Conservative gain from Independent		Swing		

=== Onehouse ===
Onehouse
Party	Candidate	Votes	%	±%
Independent	H. Mitson*	523	66.7	
Liberal	F. Brent Roach	261	33.3	
Majority		262	33.4	
Turnout		784	60.4	
Registered electors		1,299		
Independent hold		Swing		

=== Palgrave ===
Palgrave
Party	Candidate	Votes	%	±%
Independent	W. Wickett*	Unopposed		
Registered electors		1,227		
Independent hold				

=== Rickinghall ===
Rickinghall
Party	Candidate	Votes	%	±%
Independent	R. Moss	278	48.1	
Independent	A. Robertson	188	32.5	
Labour	S. Spiller	112	19.4	
Majority		90	15.6	
Turnout		578	39.9	
Registered electors		1,449		
Independent hold		Swing		

=== Stonham ===
Stonham
Party	Candidate	Votes	%	±%
Conservative	H. D'Arcy	432	74.2	
Labour	M. Douglas	150	25.8	
Majority		282	48.4	
Turnout		582	55.3	
Registered electors		1,052		
Conservative gain from Independent		Swing		

=== Stradbroke ===
Stradbroke
Party	Candidate	Votes	%	±%
Independent	S. Hawes*	Unopposed		
Registered electors		1,085		
Independent hold				

=== Thurston ===
Thurston
Party	Candidate	Votes	%	±%
Conservative	R. Kilner	484	87.2	
Labour	R. Wallington	71	12.8	
Majority		413	74.4	
Turnout		555	44.9	
Registered electors		1,236		
Conservative gain from Independent		Swing		

=== Wetheringsett ===
Wetheringsett
Party	Candidate	Votes	%	±%
Independent	G. Taylor	Unopposed		
Registered electors		1,190		
Independent hold				

=== Weybread ===
Weybread
Party	Candidate	Votes	%	±%
Conservative	G. Thompson	Unopposed		
Registered electors		1,151		
Conservative gain from Independent				

=== Worlingworth ===
Worlingworth
Party	Candidate	Votes	%	±%
Independent	M. Horvath	470	77.8	
Labour	R. Bushby	134	22.2	
Majority		336	55.6	
Turnout		604	77.1	
Registered electors		783		
Independent gain from Conservative		Swing		
