= 1976 Waveney District Council election =

1976 English local government election

- 6 May 1976

All 57 seats to Waveney District Council 29 seats needed for a majority

| | First party | Second party | Third party |
|---|---|---|---|
| Party | Conservative | Labour | Liberal |
| Seats won | 39 | 13 | 4 |
| Seat change | ▲17 | ▼14 | ▼1 |
| Popular vote | 45,132 | 38,134 | 5,455 |
| Percentage | 50.4% | 42.5% | 6.1% |
| Swing | ▲6.7% | ▼3.1% | ▼1.3% |
| | Fourth party | Fifth party |
| Party | Residents | Independent |
| Seats won | 1 | 0 |
| Seat change | Steady | ▼2 |
| Popular vote | 655 | 243 |
| Percentage | 0.7% | 0.3% |
| Swing | ▼0.1% | ▼2.2% |
Control before election
No overall control
Control after election
Conservative

The 1976 Waveney District Council election took place on 6 May 1976 to elect members of Waveney District Council in Suffolk, England. This was on the same day as other local elections.

== Summary ==
=== Election result ===
1976 Waveney District Council election
| Party | Candidates | Seats | Gains | Losses | Net gain/loss | Seats % | Votes % | Votes | +/− |
|---|---|---|---|---|---|---|---|---|---|
| Conservative | 49 | 39 | 17 | 0 | ▲17 | 68.4 | 50.4 | 45,132 | +6.7 |
| Labour | 49 | 13 | 1 | 15 | ▼14 | 22.8 | 42.5 | 38,124 | –3.1 |
| Liberal | 11 | 4 | 1 | 2 | ▼1 | 7.0 | 6.1 | 5,455 | –1.3 |
| Residents | 1 | 1 | 0 | 0 | Steady | 1.8 | 0.7 | 655 | –0.1 |
| Independent | 1 | 0 | 0 | 2 | ▼2 | 0.0 | 0.3 | 243 | –2.2 |

== Ward results ==
Incumbent councillors standing for re-election are marked with an asterisk (*). Changes in seats do not take into account by-elections or defections.

=== Beccles: North ===
Beccles: North (2 seats)
| Party | Candidate | Votes | % | ±% |
|---|---|---|---|---|
| Conservative | D. Hartley | 551 | 39.2 | |
| Conservative | D. Wilson | 453 | 32.2 | |
| Labour | G. Westwood | 426 | 30.3 | |
| Labour | A. Dean | 330 | 23.5 | |
| Turnout | | ~1,406 | 67.6 | |
| Registered electors | | 2,080 | | |
| Conservative hold | | | | |
| Conservative gain from Labour | | | | |

=== Beccles: South ===
Beccles: South (4 seats)
| Party | Candidate | Votes | % | ±% |
|---|---|---|---|---|
| Labour | R. Ellwood | 1,138 | 50.7 | |
| Conservative | C. Richardson | 1,105 | 49.3 | |
| Labour | E. Crisp | 1,030 | 46.0 | |
| Labour | C. Andrew | 961 | 42.9 | |
| Conservative | F. Sabberton | 959 | 42.8 | |
| Labour | A. Hutchinson | 888 | 39.7 | |
| Conservative | H. Fuller | 868 | 38.8 | |
| Conservative | A. Block | 859 | 38.4 | |
| Turnout | | ~1,627 | 35.9 | |
| Registered electors | | 4,529 | | |
| Labour hold | | | | |
| Conservative hold | | | | |
| Labour hold | | | | |
| Labour hold | | | | |

=== Blundeston ===
Blundeston (2 seats)
| Party | Candidate | Votes | % | ±% |
|---|---|---|---|---|
| Conservative | D. Prettyman | 752 | 53.5 | |
| Conservative | J. Paul | 693 | 49.3 | |
| Liberal | P. Coleby | 581 | 41.3 | |
| Labour | A. Owen | 228 | 16.2 | |
| Labour | O. Dillon | 214 | 15.2 | |
| Turnout | | ~1,407 | 51.4 | |
| Registered electors | | 2,738 | | |
| Conservative gain from Liberal | | | | |
| Conservative hold | | | | |

=== Brampton ===
Brampton
| Party | Candidate | Votes | % | ±% |
|---|---|---|---|---|
| Conservative | I. Trevitt | 386 | 61.6 | |
| Labour | F. Thirtle | 241 | 38.4 | |
| Majority | | 145 | 23.2 | |
| Turnout | | 627 | 63.3 | |
| Registered electors | | 992 | | |
| Conservative hold | | | | |

=== Bungay ===
Bungay (3 seats)
| Party | Candidate | Votes | % | ±% |
|---|---|---|---|---|
| Liberal | D. Richardson | 965 | 54.4 | |
| Labour | M. Mayne | 798 | 45.0 | |
| Conservative | T. Nursey | 664 | 37.4 | |
| Labour | G. Young | 663 | 37.4 | |
| Conservative | P. Bradley | 622 | 35.1 | |
| Conservative | M. Catling | 608 | 34.3 | |
| Turnout | | ~1,775 | 55.8 | |
| Registered electors | | 3,181 | | |
| Liberal hold | | | | |
| Labour gain from Liberal | | | | |
| Conservative hold | | | | |

=== Carlton Colville ===
Carlton Colville (2 seats)
| Party | Candidate | Votes | % | ±% |
|---|---|---|---|---|
| Labour | R. Dyer | 678 | 57.9 | |
| Conservative | A. Neville | 577 | 49.3 | |
| Labour | R. Beales | 545 | 46.6 | |
| Turnout | | ~1,170 | 44.3 | |
| Registered electors | | 2,641 | | |
| Labour hold | | | | |
| Conservative gain from Labour | | | | |

=== Halesworth ===
Halesworth (2 seats)
| Party | Candidate | Votes | % | ±% |
|---|---|---|---|---|
| Conservative | R. Niblett | 864 | 53.6 | |
| Conservative | E. Griffin | 751 | 46.6 | |
| Labour | H. Holzer | 704 | 43.7 | |
| Labour | E. Leverett | 703 | 43.6 | |
| Turnout | | ~1,611 | 58.8 | |
| Registered electors | | 2,740 | | |
| Conservative gain from Labour | | | | |
| Conservative gain from Labour | | | | |

=== Holton ===
Holton
| Party | Candidate | Votes | % | ±% |
|---|---|---|---|---|
| Conservative | R. Wykes-Sneyd | 412 | 62.9 | |
| Independent | E. Woodard | 243 | 37.1 | |
| Majority | | 169 | 25.8 | |
| Turnout | | 658 | 59.7 | |
| Registered electors | | 1,103 | | |
| Conservative hold | | | | |

=== Ilketshall ===
Ilketshall
| Party | Candidate | Votes | % | ±% |
|---|---|---|---|---|
| Conservative | A. Bartram | 485 | 78.9 | |
| Labour | W. Wegg | 130 | 21.1 | |
| Majority | | 355 | 57.8 | |
| Turnout | | 615 | 58.4 | |
| Registered electors | | 1,038 | | |
| Conservative hold | | | | |

=== Kessingland ===
Kessingland (2 seats)
| Party | Candidate | Votes | % | ±% |
|---|---|---|---|---|
| Conservative | G. Farmiloe | 573 | 57.6 | |
| Liberal | E. Martin | 463 | 46.6 | |
| Conservative | R. Stout | 433 | 43.6 | |
| Turnout | | ~994 | 34.7 | |
| Registered electors | | 2,863 | | |
| Conservative hold | | | | |
| Liberal gain from Labour | | | | |

=== Lowestoft: Carlton ===
Lowestoft: Carlton (6 seats)
| Party | Candidate | Votes | % | ±% |
|---|---|---|---|---|
| Conservative | J. Scarles | 1,536 | 54.7 | |
| Conservative | D. Mellor | 1,467 | 52.2 | |
| Conservative | A. Savage | 1,439 | 51.2 | |
| Conservative | D. Booth | 1,419 | 50.5 | |
| Conservative | C. Jones | 1,415 | 50.3 | |
| Conservative | J. Pugh | 1,400 | 49.8 | |
| Labour | S. Bostock | 1,272 | 45.3 | |
| Labour | D. Durrant | 1,253 | 44.6 | |
| Labour | P. Meades | 1,240 | 44.1 | |
| Labour | T. Kelly | 1,230 | 43.7 | |
| Labour | L. Davies | 1,205 | 42.8 | |
| Labour | G. Mallett | 1,157 | 41.1 | |
| Turnout | | ~2,941 | 37.1 | |
| Registered electors | | 7,926 | | |
| Conservative hold | | | | |
| Conservative gain from Labour | | | | |
| Conservative gain from Labour | | | | |
| Conservative gain from Labour | | | | |
| Conservative gain from Labour | | | | |
| Conservative gain from Labour | | | | |

=== Lowestoft: Central & Waveney ===
Lowestoft: Central & Waveney (3 seats)
| Party | Candidate | Votes | % | ±% |
|---|---|---|---|---|
| Liberal | J. Sparham | 734 | 40.3 | |
| Residents | H. Kirby | 655 | 36.0 | |
| Liberal | A. Shepherd | 622 | 34.2 | |
| Labour | B. Thompson | 432 | 23.7 | |
| Labour | D. Baldwin | 428 | 23.5 | |
| Labour | D. Nichols | 409 | 22.5 | |
| Turnout | | ~1,283 | 39.3 | |
| Registered electors | | 3,266 | | |
| Liberal hold | | | | |
| Residents hold | | | | |
| Liberal hold | | | | |

=== Lowestoft: Gunton ===
Lowestoft: Gunton (5 seats)
| Party | Candidate | Votes | % | ±% |
|---|---|---|---|---|
| Conservative | D. Cullum | 1,548 | 52.5 | |
| Conservative | N. Brighouse | 1,510 | 51.2 | |
| Conservative | V. Beales | 1,432 | 48.6 | |
| Conservative | J. Aldous | 1,423 | 48.3 | |
| Conservative | W. Harvey | 1,395 | 47.4 | |
| Labour | H. Chamberlain | 1,010 | 34.2 | |
| Labour | D. Mathew | 986 | 33.4 | |
| Labour | R. Ford | 881 | 29.9 | |
| Labour | A. Jurd | 869 | 29.5 | |
| Labour | H. Porter | 853 | 28.9 | |
| Liberal | A. Moles | 391 | 13.3 | |
| Turnout | | ~2,783 | 44.1 | |
| Registered electors | | 6,315 | | |
| Conservative hold | | | | |
| Conservative hold | | | | |
| Conservative hold | | | | |
| Conservative hold | | | | |
| Conservative gain from Labour | | | | |

=== Lowestoft: Kirkley ===
Lowestoft: Kirkley (2 seats)
| Party | Candidate | Votes | % | ±% |
|---|---|---|---|---|
| Labour | S. Ellis | 887 | 50.5 | |
| Labour | C. Myhill | 803 | 45.7 | |
| Conservative | L. Neave | 666 | 37.9 | |
| Conservative | L. Billups | 657 | 37.4 | |
| Liberal | M. Charlton | 204 | 11.6 | |
| Turnout | | ~1,754 | 54.3 | |
| Registered electors | | 3,231 | | |
| Labour hold | | | | |
| Labour hold | | | | |

=== Lowestoft: Oulton Broad ===
Lowestoft: Oulton Broad (5 seats)
| Party | Candidate | Votes | % | ±% |
|---|---|---|---|---|
| Conservative | J. Wren | 2,026 | 46.1 | |
| Conservative | M. Barnard | 1,882 | 42.8 | |
| Conservative | G. Harwood | 1,869 | 42.5 | |
| Conservative | H. Turner | 1,842 | 41.9 | |
| Conservative | A. Leedham | 1,787 | 40.6 | |
| Labour | T. Chipperfield | 1,569 | 35.7 | |
| Labour | B. Hunter | 1,546 | 35.1 | |
| Labour | A. Hale | 1,325 | 30.1 | |
| Labour | S. McIntosh | 1,172 | 26.7 | |
| Labour | D. Scu6er | 1,158 | 26.4 | |
| Liberal | K. Pointon | 798 | 18.2 | |
| Turnout | | ~3,697 | 46.9 | |
| Registered electors | | 7,884 | | |
| Conservative hold | | | | |
| Conservative hold | | | | |
| Conservative hold | | | | |
| Conservative hold | | | | |
| Conservative hold | | | | |

=== Lowestoft: Pakefield ===
Lowestoft: Pakefield (3 seats)
| Party | Candidate | Votes | % | ±% |
|---|---|---|---|---|
| Labour | A. Lark | 1,133 | 47.9 | |
| Conservative | L. Cook | 963 | 40.7 | |
| Conservative | E. Clarke | 960 | 40.6 | |
| Conservative | M. Richardson | 928 | 39.2 | |
| Labour | A. Martin | 918 | 38.8 | |
| Labour | J. Reynolds | 866 | 36.6 | |
| Liberal | B. Dobney | 271 | 11.4 | |
| Turnout | | ~2,215 | 50.1 | |
| Registered electors | | 4,422 | | |
| Labour hold | | | | |
| Conservative gain from Labour | | | | |
| Conservative gain from Labour | | | | |

=== Lowestoft: Roman Hill ===
Lowestoft: Roman Hill (2 seats)
| Party | Candidate | Votes | % | ±% |
|---|---|---|---|---|
| Labour | P. Hunt | 503 | 69.5 | |
| Labour | J. Plant | 466 | 64.4 | |
| Liberal | B. Pointon | 221 | 30.6 | |
| Turnout | | ~784 | 30.6 | |
| Registered electors | | 2,564 | | |
| Labour hold | | | | |
| Labour hold | | | | |

=== Lowestoft: St. Johns ===
Lowestoft: St. Johns (2 seats)
| Party | Candidate | Votes | % | ±% |
|---|---|---|---|---|
| Labour | T. Carter | 441 | 44.1 | |
| Labour | P. Ramm | 430 | 43.0 | |
| Conservative | H. Boyd | 414 | 41.4 | |
| Liberal | C. Shade | 205 | 20.5 | |
| Turnout | | ~1,001 | 37.6 | |
| Registered electors | | 2,662 | | |
| Labour hold | | | | |
| Labour hold | | | | |

=== Lowestoft: St. Margarets ===
Lowestoft: St. Margarets (2 seats)
| Party | Candidate | Votes | % | ±% |
|---|---|---|---|---|
| Labour | M. Reynolds | 556 | 50.5 | |
| Conservative | J. Allen | 552 | 50.1 | |
| Labour | A. Jeffreys | 421 | 38.2 | |
| Turnout | | ~1,101 | 44.3 | |
| Registered electors | | 2,485 | | |
| Labour hold | | | | |
| Conservative gain from Labour | | | | |

=== Reydon ===
Reydon (2 seats)
| Party | Candidate | Votes | % | ±% |
|---|---|---|---|---|
| Conservative | H. Kent | 765 | 63.3 | |
| Conservative | S. Simpson | 639 | 52.9 | |
| Labour | P. Gerrell | 444 | 36.7 | |
| Labour | L. English | 439 | 36.3 | |
| Turnout | | ~1,333 | 56.5 | |
| Registered electors | | 2,359 | | |
| Conservative hold | | | | |
| Conservative gain from Labour | | | | |

=== Southelmham ===
Southelmham
| Party | Candidate | Votes | % | ±% |
|---|---|---|---|---|
| Conservative | J. Stacey | Unopposed | | |
| Registered electors | | 970 | | |
| Conservative hold | | | | |

=== Southwold ===
Southwold (2 seats)
| Party | Candidate | Votes | % | ±% |
|---|---|---|---|---|
| Conservative | H. Chapman | Unopposed | | |
| Conservative | G. Cockerill | Unopposed | | |
| Registered electors | | 1,766 | | |
| Conservative gain from Independent | | | | |
| Conservative hold | | | | |

=== Worlingham ===
Worlingham
| Party | Candidate | Votes | % | ±% |
|---|---|---|---|---|
| Conservative | N. Do6 | 593 | 80.4 | |
| Labour | R. Squires | 145 | 19.6 | |
| Majority | | 448 | 60.8 | |
| Turnout | | 738 | 50.5 | |
| Registered electors | | 1,543 | | |
| Conservative hold | | | | |

=== Wrentham ===
Wrentham
| Party | Candidate | Votes | % | ±% |
|---|---|---|---|---|
| Conservative | S. Hurn | Unopposed | | |
| Registered electors | | 947 | | |
| Conservative gain from Independent | | | | |
