= 1976 North Bedfordshire Borough Council election =

North Bedfordshire Borough Council election

The 1976 North Bedfordshire Borough Council election took place on 6 May 1976 to elect members of North Bedfordshire Borough Council in England. This was on the same day as other local elections.

At the election, the Conservatives gained control of the council from No overall control.

== Summary ==
=== Election result ===
1976 North Bedfordshire Borough Council election
Party	Seats	Gains	Losses	Net gain/loss	Seats %	Votes %	Votes	+/−
Conservative	34			▲14	60.7	48.1	63,374	+14.6
Labour	9			▼13	16.1	30.1	39,678	–4.8
Independent	7			▼4	12.5	4.4	5,779	–15.2
Liberal	6			▲4	10.7	17.3	22,781	+7.3
Communist	0			Steady	0.0	<0.1	60	–0.2
Ind. Conservative	0			▼1	0.0	N/A	N/A	–0.8
