= 1976 Broxbourne Borough Council election =

1976 UK local government election

The 1976 Broxbourne Council election was held to elect council members of the Broxbourne Borough Council, the local government authority of the borough of Broxbourne, Hertfordshire, England.

== Election results ==
Broxbourne local election result 1976
Party	Seats	Gains	Losses	Net gain/loss	Seats %	Votes %	Votes	+/−
Conservative	36	36	0	+36	85.71	62.34	35,253	
Labour	6	6	0	+6	14.29	34.45	19,484	
Liberal	0	0	0	0	0.00	3.21	1,816	

== Results summary ==
The second election to Broxbourne Borough Council took place on Thursday 6 May 1976.

This was an "all out" election as a result of significant ward boundary changes since the June 1973 election.

The warding pattern was now of 14 wards, each returning 3 councillors. This meant that the council had expanded to 42 elected members – an increase of 2 councillors.

A new ward had been created to cover the Rosedale estate.

This warding pattern was to remain in effect until 1999.

Following this election borough councillors would retire in thirds starting from the 1978 election.

The councillor polling the lowest number of votes in each ward would stand for re-election in 1978. The councillor who polled the next highest number of votes would stand in 1979 and the councillor with the highest number of votes would stand in 1980.

This arrangement resulted in an electoral curiosity in Rosedale Ward where 2 of the successful candidates at this election polled exactly the same number of votes.

To determine who would "retire" in 1978 after a 2-year term of office, the successful candidates cut a pack of playing cards with the lowest card "losing"

Councillor Robert Donoghue (Conservative) drew a 6 and Councillor Mark Farrington (Labour) drew a 5.

Accordingly, Councillor Farrington was determined to have been placed 3rd in the election and stood for re-election in 1978 after a 2-year term of office.

The new political balance of the borough council was

- Conservative 36 seats
- Labour 6 seats

Shortly after the election Councillor Dan Hickman (Goffs Oak Ward) left the Conservative Group and sat as an Independent Member resulting in a revised political balance of:

- Conservative 35 seats
- Labour 6 seats
- Independent 1 seat

== Ward results ==
Broxbourne Ward Result 3 Seats 6 May 1976
Party	Candidate	Votes	%	±%
Conservative	J Fiddy	1,258	27.34	
Conservative	J E Ball	1,214	26.38	
Conservative	D C Smith	1,213	26.36	
Labour	J F Cole	343	7.46	
Labour	E Wilkinson	295	6.42	
Labour	C L Robbins	278	6.04	
Turnout		4,601	36.00	

Bury Green Ward Result 3 Seats 6 May 1976
Party	Candidate	Votes	%	±%
Conservative	B G Griffiths	888	18.37	
Conservative	M Franklin	801	16.57	
Conservative	S G Johnson	748	15.48	
Labour	W P Gardiner	675	13.97	
Labour	J W Payne	672	13.90	
Labour	C J Robbins	661	13.68	
Liberal	G C Norris	147	3.04	
Liberal	L A Richman	124	2.57	
Liberal	J H Tait	117	2.42	
Turnout		4,833	38.00	

Cheshunt Central Ward Result 3 Seats 6 May 1976
Party	Candidate	Votes	%	±%
Conservative	D E Breeze	1,077	24.94	
Conservative	L C Parker	1,061	24.57	
Conservative	G F Batchelor	1,059	24.53	
Labour	Dr A J Fletcher	417	9.66	
Labour	C N Adcock	365	8.45	
Labour	D M Hajdu	339	7.85	
Turnout		4,318	44.00	

Cheshunt North Ward Result 3 Seats 6 May 1976
Party	Candidate	Votes	%	±%
Conservative	G D Game	964	19.77	
Conservative	D Moody	940	19.27	
Conservative	D F Poole	906	18.58	
Labour	C Jarman	497	10.19	
Labour	T M Evans	492	10.09	
Labour	S N Slavny	431	8.83	
Liberal	J H S Gould	231	4.74	
Liberal	B R Wade	215	4.41	
Liberal	D G Nye	201	4.12	
Turnout		4,877	39.00	

Flamstead End Ward Result 3 Seats 6 May 1976
Party	Candidate	Votes	%	±%
Conservative	P C Sampson	961	21.50	
Conservative	J G E Swannell	942	21.08	
Conservative	L W Goodman	845	18.91	
Labour	P R Whitthread	531	11.88	
Labour	J A Moulder	482	10.79	
Labour	A J C Piddington	440	9.84	
Liberal	J E Collins	135	3.02	
Liberal	L E Collins	133	2.98	
Turnout		4,469	47.00	

Goffs Oak Ward Result 3 Seats 6 May 1976
Party	Candidate	Votes	%	±%
Conservative	M H T Janes	1,162	29.01	
Conservative	J M Sanderson	1,105	27.58	
Conservative	D T Hickman	1,084	27.06	
Labour	T Mutter	243	6.07	
Labour	C A Flanders	214	5.34	
Labour	H W Peat	198	4.94	
Turnout		4,006	48.00	

Hoddesdon North Ward Result 3 Seats 6 May 1976
Party	Candidate	Votes	%	±%
Conservative	J S Hastings	1,242	26.11	
Conservative	G C B Walker	1,200	25.23	
Conservative	R A S Key	1,183	24.87	
Labour	A P Hillyard	397	8.35	
Labour	J M Pye	371	7.80	
Labour	M Love	363	7.64	
Turnout		4,756	36.00	

Hoddesdon Town Ward Result 3 Seats 6 May 1976
Party	Candidate	Votes	%	±%
Conservative	P C Madsen	710	19.68	
Conservative	K A Sandison	669	18.54	
Conservative	B D G Fallace	664	18.40	
Labour	G Andrews	385	10.67	
Labour	I R Barrett	360	9.98	
Labour	C Rochester	307	8.51	
Liberal	R A Bomber	276	7.65	
Liberal	R T Chilton	237	6.57	
Turnout		3,608	32.00	

Rosedale Ward Result 3 Seats 6 May 1976
Party	Candidate	Votes	%	±%
Labour	H Ross	281	17.37	
Conservative	R J Donoghue	274	16.93	
Labour	M Farrington	274	16.93	
Conservative	A S A Ebeling	269	16.63	
Labour	S I Farrington	262	16.19	
Conservative	L A Fortune	258	15.95	
Turnout		1,618	48.00	

Rye Park Ward Result 3 Seats 6 May 1976
Party	Candidate	Votes	%	±%
Conservative	G J Conway	783	18.23	
Labour	J H Davis	761	17.72	
Conservative	A P Bridgeman	713	16.60	
Conservative	I M Hastings	705	16.41	
Labour	T K Pearson	684	15.93	
Labour	M J Pye	649	15.11	
Turnout		4,295	37.00	

Theobalds Ward Result 3 Seats 6 May 1976
Party	Candidate	Votes	%	±%
Conservative	M R Linscott	996	21.79	
Conservative	G F Ebeling	964	21.09	
Conservative	H J Collins	936	20.48	
Labour	J Carter	581	12.71	
Labour	Lady A J Bailey	553	12.10	
Labour	R A Paice	541	11.83	
Turnout		4,571	40.00	

Waltham Cross North Ward Result 3 Seats 6 May 1976
Party	Candidate	Votes	%	±%
Conservative	T C A Askew	724	18.86	
Conservative	D Forbes-Buckingham	680	17.71	
Conservative	N M Sanderson	664	17.29	
Labour	E L Carter	632	16.46	
Labour	I J Evans	598	15.57	
Labour	L A Levoi	542	14.11	
Turnout		3,840	45.00	

Waltham Cross South Ward Result 3 Seats 6 May 1976
Party	Candidate	Votes	%	±%
Labour	P R Young	848	20.13	
Labour	M S Oliver	796	18.88	
Labour	J K Paice	789	18.72	
Conservative	J F T Swannell	639	15.16	
Conservative	F Dolan	597	14.16	
Conservative	M J Dowsett	546	12.95	
Turnout		4,215	37.00	

Wormley / Turnford Ward Result 3 Seats 6 May 1976
Party	Candidate	Votes	%	±%
Conservative	G Cookson	564	22.15	
Conservative	O G Alderman	532	20.90	
Conservative	B F Hill	513	20.15	
Labour	J Carnfield	337	13.24	
Labour	A J Cooper	317	12.45	
Labour	E J Nicholls	283	11.11	
Turnout		2,546	41.00	
