= 1976 South Ribble Borough Council election =

Elections to South Ribble Borough Council were held on 6 May 1976. The whole council was up for election and the Conservative Party expanded its majority. The election was held in new boundaries established in 1975.

Composition of the Borough Council after the 1976 election

== Election result ==
South Ribble local election result 1976
Party	Seats	Gains	Losses	Net gain/loss	Seats %	Votes %	Votes	+/−
Conservative	45			▲15	83.3	58.9	42213	
Labour	8			▼8	14.8	29.1	20879	
Liberal	0			▼2	0.0	8.5	6072	
Independent	1			Steady	1.9	2.1	1535	
Residents	0			Steady	0.0	1.3	956	

== Ward results ==
All Saints
Party	Candidate	Votes	%	±%
Conservative	M. Rhodes	1,157	23.9	
Conservative	A. Clark	1,034	21.3	
Conservative	R. Welhmam	989	20.4	
Labour	R. Shimmon	453	9.3	
Labour	P. Bradbury	414	8.5	
Liberal	A. Crook	406	8.4	
Labour	G. Hull	397	8.2	

Bamber Bridge Central
Party	Candidate	Votes	%	±%
Conservative	F. Cooper	1,240	21.0	
Conservative	G. Woods	1,224	20.7	
Conservative	L. Swarbrick	1,198	20.3	
Labour	G. Davies	797	13.5	
Labour	G. Nicholson	730	12.3	
Labour	D. Watson	725	12.3	

Charnock
Party	Candidate	Votes	%	±%
Conservative	R. Morgan	320	68.2	
Labour	J. Stoker	149	31.8	

Farington
Party	Candidate	Votes	%	±%
Conservative	L. Craven	1,002	21.3	
Conservative	C. Leather	1,002	21.1	
Conservative	G. Thorpe	934	19.8	
Labour	P. Ward	664	14.1	
Labour	N. Ward	579	12.3	
Labour	B. Guilfoyle	537	11.4	

Howick
Party	Candidate	Votes	%	±%
Conservative	D. Stewart	930	46.3	
Conservative	H. Smith	924	46.0	
Labour	J. Prance	153	7.6	

Hutton & New Longton
Party	Candidate	Votes	%	±%
Independent	V. Peacock	1,254	27.3	
Conservative	M. Robinson	1,168	25.4	
Conservative	J. Simpson	961	20.9	
Conservative	W. Eccles	953	20.7	
Labour	J. Hubberstey	263	5.7	

Kingsfold
Party	Candidate	Votes	%	±%
Conservative	J. Jenkinson	788	22.3	
Conservative	E. Carson	739	20.9	
Conservative	V. Rhodes	717	20.3	
Labour	M. Lyons	533	15.1	
Labour	J. Harvey	384	10.9	
Labour	D. Calder	368	10.4	

Little Hoole & Much Hoole
Party	Candidate	Votes	%	±%
Conservative	J. Knowles	429	39.8	
Conservative	E. Webster	368	34.1	
Independent	A. Cartmell	281	26.1	

Longton Central & West
Party	Candidate	Votes	%	±%
Conservative	A. Burdon	1,065	29.3	
Conservative	D. Protheroe	946	26.1	
Conservative	J. Eyles	900	24.8	
Liberal	J. Steward	479	13.2	
Labour	S. Hubberstey	241	6.6	

Manor
Party	Candidate	Votes	%	±%
Conservative	R. Richardson	878	49.6	
Conservative	J. Rickards	713	40.3	
Labour	N. Hall	180	10.2	

Middleforth Green
Party	Candidate	Votes	%	±%
Conservative	K. Dickinson	472	25.3	
Conservative	R. Harwood	413	22.1	
Labour	A. Anderson	284	15.2	
Labour	E. McEvoy	275	14.7	
Liberal	E. Whiteley	216	11.6	
Liberal	L. Fletcher	207	11.1	

Moss Side
Party	Candidate	Votes	%	±%
Conservative	K. Dickinson	329	74.8	
Labour	R. Brown	82	18.6	
Liberal	A. Caunce-Peacock	29	6.6	

Priory
Party	Candidate	Votes	%	±%
Conservative	S. Allison	786	47.1	
Conservative	W. Valentine	747	44.7	
Labour	M. Graham	137	8.2	

Samlesbury & Cuerdale
Party	Candidate	Votes	%	±%
Conservative	F. Barton	Unopposed		

Seven Stars
Party	Candidate	Votes	%	±%
Labour	C. Dawber	1,087	21.6	
Labour	A. Kelly	1,001	19.9	
Labour	J. Bradley	994	19.7	
Conservative	J. Lawson	661	13.1	
Conservative	D. Pass	660	13.1	
Conservative	J. Stone	633	12.6	

St. Ambrose Wesley
Party	Candidate	Votes	%	±%
Conservative	G. Eland	683	13.3	
Labour	A. Dawson	672	13.1	
Labour	J. Crossley	661	12.8	
Liberal	D. Lake	577	11.2	
Liberal	K. Orrell	570	11.1	
Conservative	K. Green	535	10.4	
Conservative	L. Gadd	514	10.0	
Liberal	M. Kirkham	480	9.3	
Labour	J. Nelson	456	8.9	

St. Andrews
Party	Candidate	Votes	%	±%
Conservative	N. Greenwood	641	31.0	
Conservative	S. Kelley	535	25.8	
Liberal	N. Orrell	430	20.8	
Labour	J. Ryan	292	14.1	
Liberal	G. Kinnaird	173	8.4	

St. Johns
Party	Candidate	Votes	%	±%
Labour	F. Stringfellow	993	23.9	
Labour	J. Hocking	969	23.3	
Labour	M. Walsh	859	20.7	
Conservative	V. Just	573	13.8	
Liberal	S. Croasdale	273	6.6	
Liberal	R. Caunce-Peacock	268	6.5	
Liberal	D. Mann	219	5.3	

St. Leonards
Party	Candidate	Votes	%	±%
Conservative	J. Coupe	1,091	30.0	
Conservative	K. Palmer	1,064	29.2	
Conservative	J. Lawson	1,058	29.1	
Labour	J. Nolan	427	11.7	

St. Marys
Party	Candidate	Votes	%	±%
Conservative	J. Hall	1,257	26.3	
Conservative	J. Marsden	1,129	23.6	
Conservative	B. Pickup	992	20.8	
Labour	L. Day	441	9.2	
Liberal	M. Lloyd	374	7.8	
Liberal	K. Lake	335	7.0	
Liberal	S. O'Shea	250	5.2	

Walton-Le-Dale South
Party	Candidate	Votes	%	±%
Conservative	H. Kerfoot	871	16.6	
Conservative	D. Hughes	740	14.1	
Labour	T. Bayes	703	13.4	
Conservative	R. Dixon	698	13.3	
Labour	K. Lloyd	530	10.1	
Residents	F. Hudson	522	10.0	
Labour	D. Williams	514	9.8	
Residents	J. Ayling	434	8.3	
Liberal	S. Catt	224	4.3	

Walton-Le-Dale West
Party	Candidate	Votes	%	±%
Conservative	D. Baxter	892	17.6	
Conservative	R. Ainscough	864	17.1	
Conservative	C. Elliott	802	15.9	
Labour	A. White	781	15.5	
Labour	B. Cox	722	14.3	
Labour	P. Renshaw	673	13.3	
Liberal	R. Watson	321	6.4	
