= 1976 Guildford Borough Council election =

1976 UK local government election

The second Guildford Borough Council full-council elections were held on 6 May 1976. The Conservatives retained control of the council with an increased majority, winning 35 of the 45 seats.

When Guildford Borough Council was created under the Local Government Act 1972 the electoral wards used were largely based on the wards and parish boundaries which had existed under the two previous councils - Guildford Municipal Borough Council (the town council) and Guildford Rural District Council, which together had been merged to form the new Guildford Borough Council.

There had been a slight degree of rewarding in the run up to the 1973 council election. For example, the pre 1973 Friary ward and pre 1973 St Nicolas ward were merged into a new Friary & St Nicolas ward.

Complete rewarding though would only be completed in time for the 1976 elections. The main changes to the electoral wards in the run up to the 1976 elections were as follows -

Ash ward (5 councillors) was split into two wards Ash (3 councillors) plus Ash Vale (2 councillors);

A new Christchurch ward (2 councillors) was created from part of the Stoke ward and part of the Merrow & Burpham ward;

As a result of this Merrow & Burpham ward reduced from 5 councillors to 3. However the geographically reduced Stoke ward still retained its 3 councillors;

Artington, Compton, Puttenham, Seale and Tongham, Shackleford and Wanborough ward (2 councillors) was split into two wards Tongham (1 councillor), plus Pilgrims (2 councillors). This represented a gain of one councillor for this area;

Stoughton saw the number of councillors represent it increase from 2 to 3;

Worplesdon also saw the number of councillors represent it increase from 2 to 3;

Albury, Shere and St Martha's ward (2 councillors) was renamed Tillingbourne (2 councillors);

East Clandon, West Clandon, East Horsley and West Horsley ward (3 councillors) was renamed Clandon and Horsley (3 councillors); and

Ripley, Wisley and Ockham ward (1 councillor) was renamed Lovelace (1 councillor).

In the 1976 election the Liberals lost three seats reducing their representation from 5 to 2. They lost one councillor in Clandon & Horsley (previously called East Clandon, West Clandon, East Horsley and West Horsley). They lost 2 of their 3 councillors in Friary & St Nicolas.

Labour retained all 6 councillors in its two strongholds Stoke and Westborough.

The Conservatives increased their number of councillors from 29 to 35, a figure which up to and including 2011 still remained a record for any party in a full Guildford Borough Council election.

The Conservatives 6 gains included 3 gains from the Liberals - 2 in Friary & St Nicolas and 1 in Clandon & Horsley. The Conservatives gained 1 seat from an Independent in Tillingbourne (previously known as Aldbury, Shere and St Martha's) and made 2 gains as a result of an increase in the number of councillors representing the Stoughton and Worplesdon wards.

A total of 2 independents were elected. Independents lost one councillor in Tillingbourne, but gained one in the new Tongham ward where the elected candidate was described as an Independent Conservative. That Independent Conservative then went on to stand at the next full council election, in 1979, as the official Conservative candidate for the Tongham ward.

== Results by ward ==
Ash (top 3 candidates elected)
Party	Candidate	Votes	%	±%
Conservative	JG Ades	1543		
Conservative	Mrs RC Hall	1446		
Conservative	BM Llewellyn	1412		
Labour	Mrs J Curwell	753		
Labour	AR Roberts	701		
Labour	PD Green	695		
Majority		659		
Turnout				

Ash Vale (top 2 candidates elected)
Party	Candidate	Votes	%	±%
Conservative	Mrs IF Towler	971		
Conservative	Mrs JB Golding	936		
Labour	Miss MI Hawkins	319		
Labour	E Bones	289		
Majority		617		
Turnout				

Christchurch (top 2 candidates elected)
Party	Candidate	Votes	%	±%
Conservative	JP Twining	1552		
Conservative	AJE Hodges	1531		
Labour	J Wyer	221		
Labour	MA Ridgway	213		
Majority		1310		
Turnout				

Clandon & Horsley (top 3 candidates elected)
Party	Candidate	Votes	%	±%
Conservative	DA May	2063		
Conservative	MF Meredith	1939		
Conservative	GF Farrar	1688		
Liberal	Mrs PM Iliff	1528		
Liberal	WH Pearson	1115		
Liberal	FA Oxford	951		
Majority		160		
Turnout				

Effingham (only 1 candidate elected)
Party	Candidate	Votes	%	±%
Conservative	Col BP Trywhitt-Drake	678		
Liberal	Mrs JH Ormond	276		
Majority		402		
Turnout				

Friary & St. Nicolas (top 3 candidates elected)
Party	Candidate	Votes	%	±%
Liberal	Dr RE Blundell	1074		
Conservative	DS Cobbett	1052		
Conservative	Mrs J Harris	1038		
Liberal	Mrs MF Bateman	1015		
Conservative	AJ Spanner	970		
Liberal	RG Marks	957		
Labour	Mrs J Henman	421		
Labour	M Mennel	372		
Labour	Mrs G Lines	353		
Majority		23		
Turnout				

Holy Trinity (top 2 candidates elected)
Party	Candidate	Votes	%	±%
Liberal	BAH Banks	1207		
Conservative	CJK Boyce	1118		
Conservative	HA Wainwright	1020		
Liberal	Mrs PJ Maynard	887		
Majority		98		
Turnout				

Lovelace (only 1 candidate elected)
Party	Candidate	Votes	%	±%
Conservative	DAG Gibbs	unopposed		

Merrow & Burpham (top 3 candidates elected)
Party	Candidate	Votes	%	±%
Conservative	Mrs MM Walls	1938		
Conservative	RHG Beatrip	1655		
Conservative	SG Brearley	1606		
Liberal	BR Avery	531		
Labour	D Wynne	513		
Liberal	AR Dakers	494		
Liberal	CJ Oliver	471		
Labour	MP Hill	406		
Labour	G Hall	396		
Majority		1075		
Turnout				

Normandy (only 1 candidate elected)
Party	Candidate	Votes	%	±%
Conservative	AA Cook	670		
Labour	PJ Dyson	366		
Majority		304		
Turnout				

Onslow (top 3 candidates elected)
Party	Candidate	Votes	%	±%
Conservative	Mrs PE Harding	1332		
Conservative	TR Hawke	1113		
Conservative	Mrs BM Woodhatch	1085		
Liberal	SH Elston	625		
Labour	J Cox	570		
Labour	Mrs CA Rogers	498		
Labour	Mrs LM Harper	495		
Liberal	AJ Phillips	488		
Liberal	Mrs L Strudwick	409		
Majority		460		
Turnout				

Pilgrims (top 2 candidates elected)
Party	Candidate	Votes	%	±%
Conservative	JD Harris	1130		
Conservative	JP Moore	1117		
Labour	Mrs J Bridgewater	203		
Labour	C Hardiman	202		
Majority		814		
Turnout				

Pirbright (only 1 candidate elected)
Party	Candidate	Votes	%	±%
Conservative	RH Amis	unopposed		

Send (top 2 candidates elected)
Party	Candidate	Votes	%	±%
Conservative	Mrs MH Sanger	945		
Conservative	SE Roberts	902		
Labour	Mrs JM Haimes	207		
Majority		695		
Turnout				

Shalford (only 1 candidate elected)
Party	Candidate	Votes	%	±%
Conservative	Mrs ECS Stewart	777		
Independent	GA Goulty	487		
Majority		290		
Turnout				

Stoke (top 3 candidates elected)
Party	Candidate	Votes	%	±%
Labour	GR Bellerby	2093		
Labour	RGK Burgess	1551		
Labour	Mrs E Pullan	1456		
Conservative	HE Harris	723		
	PM Laurence	577		
Conservative	JR Williams	552		
Majority		733		
Turnout				

Stoughton (top 3 candidates elected)
Party	Candidate	Votes	%	±%
Conservative	WR Jordan	1298		
Conservative	LJ May	1259		
Conservative	RE Price	1220		
Liberal	Mrs S Holyroyd	780		
Liberal	GW Maynard	725		
Liberal	KL Humphries	722		
Labour	JFahy	669		
Labour	SW Cosser	570		
Labour	OJE Sefton	563		
Majority		440		
Turnout				

Tillingbourne (top 2 candidates elected)
Party	Candidate	Votes	%	±%
Conservative	MP Dallyn	1099		
Independent	Mrs MR Elston	998		
Independent	GA Witheridge	772		
Conservative	PRJ Rock de Besombes	642		
Independent	Mrs M Ellenger	378		
Majority		226		
Turnout				

Tongham (only 1 candidate elected)
Party	Candidate	Votes	%	±%
Ind. Conservative	PM Davies	184		
Independent	RT Oliver	181		
Majority		3		
Turnout				

Westborough (top 3 candidates elected)
Party	Candidate	Votes	%	±%
Labour	Mrs DW Bellerby	1473		
Labour	JB Patrick	1279		
Labour	JR Dale	1272		
Conservative	BJ Gibbs	741		
Conservative	Mrs DM Hall	703		
Conservative	Mrs EM Cobbett	674		
Liberal	KG Briggs	518		
Liberal	Mrs BS Redclift	389		
Liberal	MWJ Morris	385		
Majority		531		
Turnout				

Worplesdon (top 3 candidates elected)
Party	Candidate	Votes	%	±%
Conservative	DW Reeds	1090		
Conservative	Mrs SE Simkins	1074		
Conservative	GF Hellicar	1040		
Independent	H Cater	836		
Liberal	PJ Stokoe	575		
Liberal	Mrs JW Trindles	487		
Majority		204		
Turnout				
