= 1973 United Kingdom local elections =

- 12 April 1973 (England & Wales); 1 May 1973 (Scotland); 10 May 1973 (England & Wales); 30 May 1973 (Northern Ireland); 7 June 1973 (England)

1 Unicameral area, all 6 metropolitan counties, all 39 non-metropolitan counties, all 36 metropolitan boroughs, all 296 English districts, 1 sui generis authority, all 26 Northern Irish districts, all 8 Welsh counties and all 37 Welsh districts
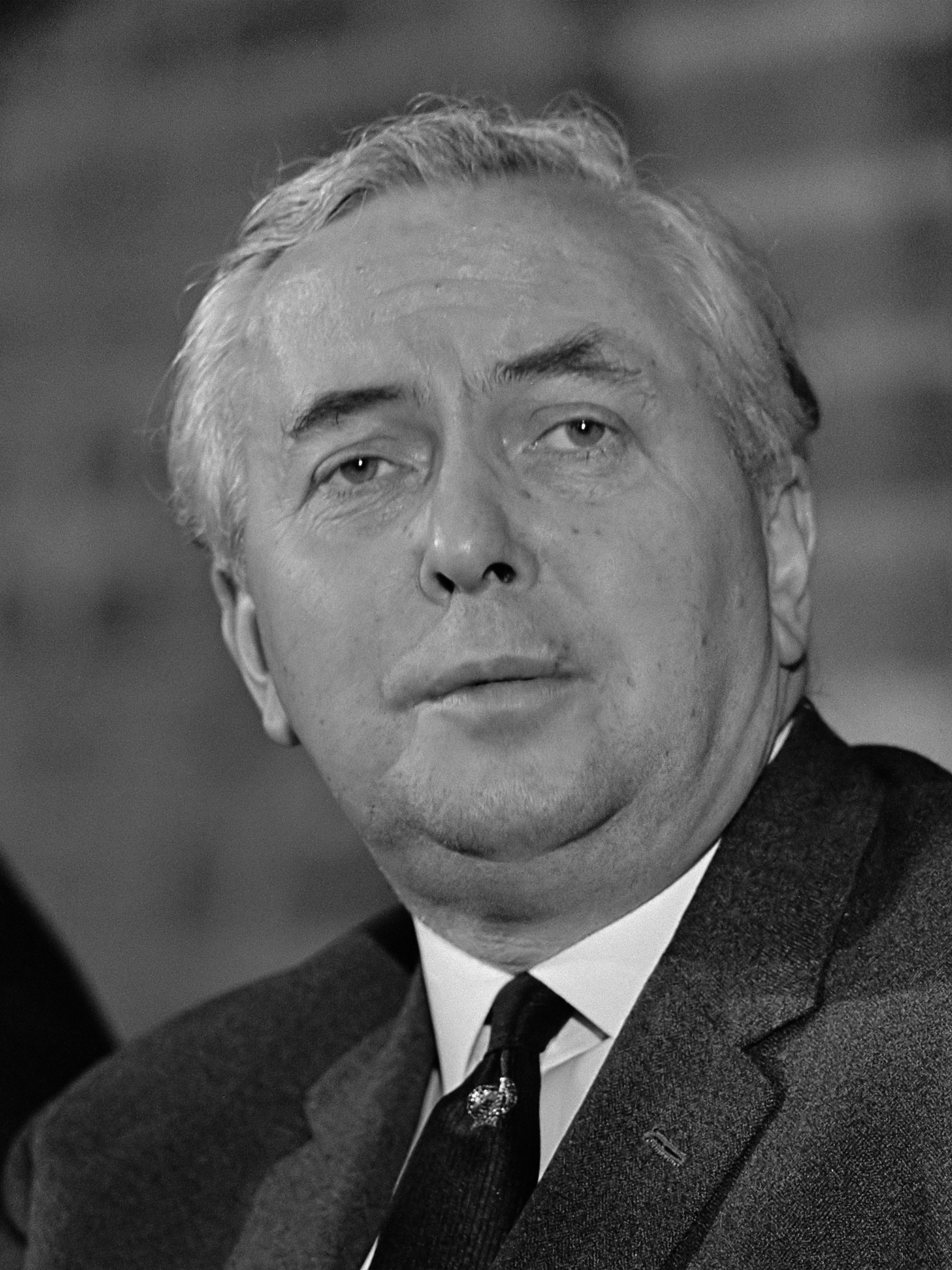

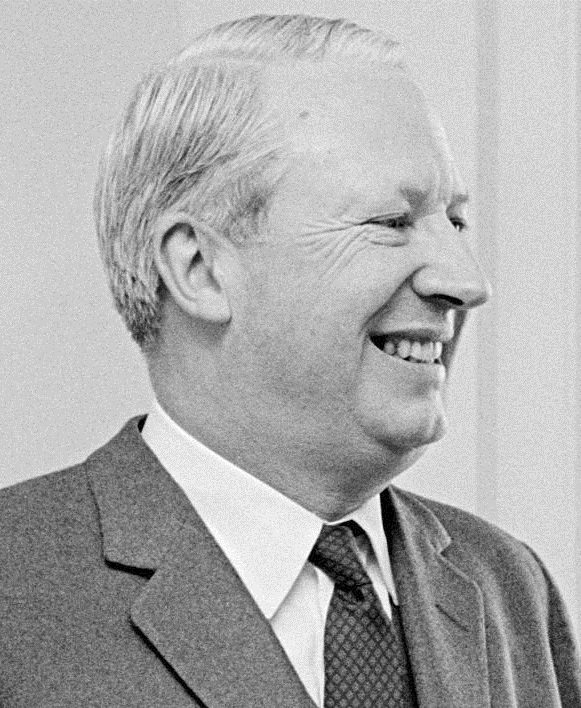
	Majority party	Minority party	Third party
			Lib
Leader	Harold Wilson	Edward Heath	Jeremy Thorpe
Party	Labour	Conservative	Liberal
Leader since	14 February 1963	27 July 1965	18 January 1967
- Map of the results of the elections in England and Wales, showing party control by district (left) and county (right).

The first elections to the new local authorities established by the Local Government Act 1972 in England and Wales and the new Northern Ireland district councils created by the Local Government Act (Northern Ireland) 1972 took place in 1973. Elections to the existing Greater London Council also took place.

== England and Wales ==
The elections took place on three dates:

- 12 April 1973: Metropolitan county councils (601 councillors), Non-metropolitan county councils (3,128 councillors), Welsh county councils (578 councillors) and the Greater London Council (92 councillors).
- 10 May 1973: Metropolitan district councils (2,517 councillors) and Welsh district councils (1,522 councillors).
- 7 June 1973: Non-metropolitan district councils (13,540 councillors).

Elections took place for all the seats on the councils. In the case of the new councils, they became shadow authorities, taking over from the existing local authorities on 1 April 1974. The elections for the new councils had been brought forward from an originally planned date in November 1973, to allow the councils more time to act as shadow authorities - the final dates were set in May 1972.

=== The April elections ===
The elections held on 12 April saw a very impressive performance by the Labour Party, which regained control of the Greater London Council and took control of all six of the new metropolitan county councils. In the rest of England, they won seven county councils, including two of the new "estuary" counties: Cleveland and Humberside. The party also won Gwent and the three Glamorgan county councils (West Glamorgan, Mid Glamorgan, South Glamorgan) in Wales.

The poor Conservative vote in London and the metropolitan counties was somewhat compensated by winning thirteen of the non-metropolitan counties. Failure to gain Essex or Hertfordshire were disappointments to the party, but taking control of Gloucestershire was a success. The party also failed to gain its only realistic Welsh prospect, South Glamorgan.

There were no great successes for the Liberal Party, which found itself in third place in all the metropolitan counties. They did however gain representation on the GLC for the first time, winning two seats at Sutton and Cheam and Richmond upon Thames. This followed the previous year's by-election success in winning the Sutton and Cheam parliamentary seat from the Conservatives.

Independents won two English counties outright: Cornwall and the Isle of Wight. They also formed the largest grouping on a number of other councils, and entered agreements with the Conservatives in the running of some of these. In Wales, Independents controlled three mainly rural counties.

=== The May elections ===
The results of the elections in May saw an improvement in the performance by the Conservatives since the county council elections, and a slight fall back in the Labour vote. The Liberals had a notable success, becoming the largest group on Liverpool council.

The Conservatives took control of five metropolitan districts, gaining seats in areas where they had been beaten in the elections to the county councils. They also gained one Welsh district, Monmouth.

The Labour party declared it was pleased with the results, especially as opinion polls had shown them losing support. They took control of most of the metropolitan districts, making a clean sweep of councils in Tyne and Wear and South Yorkshire and important councils such as Birmingham, Coventry and Manchester. Labour also took control of most districts in South Wales including Cardiff. The party's organiser for Wales also pointed to the fact that official Labour candidates won rural seats in north and west Wales for the first time.

Apart from forming a minority administration in Liverpool, the Liberals were able to hold the balance of power at Leeds, Stockport and Wirral. They were however disappointed with their performance at Calderdale which was won by Labour.

=== The June elections ===
In the June elections for 296 non-metropolitan districts, Labour won control of 71, the Conservatives 59, the Liberals 1, Democratic Labour 1, and Independents 67. 97 councils were under no overall control: in many of these councils Conservative and Independent groups formed an administration.

The Labour Party won 4,327 seats, the Conservatives 4,286, Independents 3,534, and the Liberals 919; with the remaining 449 seats going to various other groupings.

It was a good result for the Liberal Party who took control of Eastbourne and became the largest group on Adur, Newbury, Pendle and Waverley councils. The other two main parties also had notable successes: Labour considered control of Cambridge, Dacorum, Ipswich and Oxford to be good results; while the Conservatives celebrated taking Gloucester, Great Yarmouth, Lewes and Warrington councils.

The break-away Lincoln Democratic Labour Association won twenty of the thirty seats on Lincoln District council. The group were supporters of Dick Taverne, member of parliament for Lincoln who had been expelled from the Labour Party. Taverne had earlier in the year resigned his seat to force a by-election in protest against his expulsion, which he won against the official Labour candidate.

=== Results ===
==== Metropolitan county councils ====
Council	Con	Lab	Lib	Ind	Others	Control
Greater Manchester	23	69	13	1	0	Labour
Merseyside	26	53	19	0	1 (Note: Ratepayers)	Labour
South Yorkshire	13	82	1	4	0	Labour
Tyne and Wear	26	74	1	3	0	Labour
West Midlands	26	74	4	0	0	Labour
West Yorkshire	25	51	11	1	0	Labour

==== Non-metropolitan county councils ====
Council	Con	Lab	Lib	Ind	Others	Control	Details
Avon	36	32	2	3	0	No overall control	Details
Bedfordshire	32	39	8	3	1 (Note: Vacancy)	No overall control	Details
Berkshire	42	26	13	5	0	No overall control (Conservative-Independent)	Details
Buckinghamshire	36	18	4	12	0	Conservative	Details
Cambridgeshire	28	22	5	13	0	No overall control	Details
Cheshire	31	29	1	6	0	No overall control	Details
Cleveland	35	52	0	2	0	Labour	Details
Cornwall	3	1	0	75	0	Independent	Details
Cumbria	31	38	1	6	0	No overall control	Details
Derbyshire	26	60	5	7	0	Labour	Details
Devon	54	20	11	12	0	Conservative	Details
Dorset	47	13	11	20	0	Conservative	Details
Durham	2	56	6	7	0	Labour	Details
East Sussex	48	19	9	8	0	Conservative	Details
Essex	47	40	5	5	0	No overall control (Conservative minority)	Details
Gloucestershire	31	18	5	7	0	Conservative	Details
Hampshire	44	27	6	20	0	No overall control (Conservative-Independent)	Details
Hereford and Worcester	37	30	8	17	0	No overall control (Conservative-Independent)	Details
Hertfordshire	33	33	3	2	1 (Note: Ratepayers)	No overall control	Details
Humberside	36	51	3	7	2 (Note: Vacancies)	Labour	Details
Isle of Wight	6	6	7	23	0	Independent	Details
Kent	63	31	7	2	0	Conservative	Details
Lancashire	52	33	7	3	1	Conservative	Details
Leicestershire	41	37	7	8	0	No overall control (Conservative-Independent)	Details
Lincolnshire	34	10	3	22	0	No overall control	Details
Norfolk	52	27	0	4	0	Conservative	Details
North Yorkshire	39	12	12	29	0	No overall control (Conservative-Independent)	Details
Northamptonshire	38	46	3	4	2	Labour	Details
Northumberland	10	28	0	21	0	No overall control	Details
Nottinghamshire	35	54	0	0	0	Labour	Details
Oxfordshire	36	21	0	10	0	Conservative	Details
Salop	14	16	3	30	0	No overall control	Details
Somerset	35	7	2	12	0	Conservative	Details
Staffordshire	28	47	1	9	0	Labour	Details
Suffolk	47	29	3	0	3	Conservative	Details
Surrey	46	12	9	5	0	Conservative	Details
Warwickshire	27	21	5	2	0	No overall control	Details
West Sussex	52	10	7	13	1	Conservative	Details
Wiltshire	40	22	6	11	0	Conservative	Details

==== Welsh county councils ====
Council	Con	Lab	Lib	PC	Ind	Others	Control
Clwyd	11	20	4	0	30	1 (Note: Vacancy)	No overall control
Dyfed	0	29	8	1	40	1 (Note: Ratepayers)	Independent
Gwent	12	59	3	1	1	2	Labour
Gwynedd	0	4	0	6	56	0	Independent
Mid Glamorgan	3	63	2	6	6	2 (Note: Communist)	Labour
Powys	3	7	3	0	38	0	Independent
South Glamorgan	35	42	0	0	3	0	Labour
West Glamorgan	9	52	2	1	4	2 (Note: 1 Progressive Labour, 1 Ratepayers)	Labour

==== Greater London Council ====
Council	Con	Lab	Lib	Control
Greater London	32	58	2	Labour

==== Metropolitan districts ====
Council	County	Con	Lab	Lib	Ind	Others	Control	Details
Barnsley	South Yorkshire	0	57	0	1	2 (Note: 1 Independent Labour, 1 Democratic Labour)	Labour	Details
Birmingham	West Midlands	44	73	9	0	0	Labour	Details
Bolton	Greater Manchester	35	31	2	1	0	Conservative	Details
Bradford	West Yorkshire	53	31	9	0	0	Conservative	Details
Bury	Greater Manchester	21	20	7	0	0	No overall control	Details
Calderdale	West Yorkshire	18	28	5	0	0	Labour	Details
Coventry	West Midlands	12	42	0	0	0	Labour	Details
Doncaster	South Yorkshire	12	43	0	4	1 (Note: Democratic Labour)	Labour	Details
Dudley	West Midlands	24	40	1	1	1 (Note: Independent Labour)	Labour	Details
Gateshead	Tyne and Wear	6	71	0	0	1 (Note: Rent and Ratepayers)	Labour	Details
Kirklees	West Yorkshire	18	45	8	1	0	Labour	Details
Knowsley	Merseyside	6	52	4	0	1 (Note: Kirkby Householders Federation)	Labour	Details
Leeds	West Yorkshire	38	44	14	0	0	No overall control	Details
Liverpool	Merseyside	9	42	48	0	0	No overall control (Liberal minority)	Details
Manchester	Greater Manchester	40	59	0	0	0	Labour	Details
Newcastle upon Tyne	Tyne and Wear	23	51	1	3	0	Labour	Details
North Tyneside	Tyne and Wear	19	48	7	4	0	Labour	Details
Oldham	Greater Manchester	6	42	5	1	3 (Note: Vacancies)	Labour	Details
Rochdale	Greater Manchester	14	37	9	0	0	Labour	Details
Rotherham	South Yorkshire	3	50	0	1	0	Labour	Details
St Helens	Merseyside	9	36	0	0	0	Labour	Details
Salford	Greater Manchester	15	50	1	0	0	Labour	Details
Sandwell	West Midlands	24	66	0	0	0	Labour	Details
Sefton	Merseyside	37	24	3	2	3 (Note: Ratepayers)	Conservative	Details
Sheffield	South Yorkshire	18	69	3	0	0	Labour	Details
Solihull	West Midlands	28	12	2	9	0	Conservative	Details
South Tyneside	Tyne and Wear	3	45	0	0	18 (Note: Progressive)	Labour	Details
Stockport	Greater Manchester	27	16	13	4	0	No overall control (Conservative-Independent)	Details
Sunderland	Tyne and Wear	21	56	0	1	0	Labour	Details
Tameside	Greater Manchester	14	38	2	0	0	Labour	Details
Trafford	Greater Manchester	32	16	12	0	0	Conservative	Details
Wakefield	West Yorkshire	6	58	0	1	1	Labour	Details
Walsall	West Midlands	11	44	0	2	3	Labour	Details
Wigan	Greater Manchester	5	66	0	1	0	Labour	Details
Wirral	Merseyside	29	24	13	0	0	No overall control	Details
Wolverhampton	West Midlands	20	40	0	0	0	Labour	Details

==== Welsh districts ====
Council	County	Con	Lab	Lib	PC	Ind	Others	Control
Aberconwy	Gwynedd	4	3	0	0	34	0	Independent
Alyn-Dee	Clwyd	9	25	4	0	7	0	Labour
Afan	West Glamorgan	0	21	0	0	0	9 (Note: 5 Ratepayers, 3 Tenants Association, 1 Unofficial Labour)	Labour
Arfon	Gwynedd	0	8	0	5	27	0	Independent
Blaenau Gwent	Gwent	0	31	3	1	1	15 (Note: 7 Independent Labour, 7 Ratepayers, 1 Tenants and Residents)	Labour
Brecknock	Powys	4	17	1	0	29	0	Independent
Cardiff	South Glamorgan	33	42	0	0	0	0	Labour
Carmarthen	Dyfed	0	7	0	0	28	1 (Note: Ratepayers)	Independent
Ceredigion	Dyfed	0	4	9	0	30	0	Independent
Colwyn	Clwyd	1	0	10	0	22	0	Independent
Cynon Valley	Mid Glamorgan	0	23	0	12	0	3	Labour
Delyn	Clwyd	1	11	0	2	26	0	Independent
Dinefwr	Dyfed	0	17	1	0	13	1 (Note: Independent Socialist)	Labour
Dwyfor	Gwynedd	0	0	0	1	28	0	Independent
Glyndŵr	Clwyd	0	3	0	0	30	0	Independent
Islwyn	Gwent	0	30	0	2	3	1 (Note: Communist)	Labour
Llanelli	Dyfed	0	29	0	0	4	0	Labour
Lliw Valley	West Glamorgan	0	27	0	2	3	0	Labour
Meirionnydd	Gwynedd	0	0	0	0	39	0	Independent
Merthyr Tydfil	Mid Glamorgan	0	25	0	4	1	3	Labour
Monmouth	Gwent	29	9	0	0	1	0	Conservative
Montgomery	Powys	0	2	3	0	44	0	Independent
Neath	West Glamorgan	0	24	0	2	2	5 (Note: 1 Ratepayers, 4 vacancies)	Labour
Newport	Gwent	8	36	2	0	5	0	Labour
Ogwr	Mid Glamorgan	6	42	1	1	3	4 (Note: 3 Ratepayers, 1 Independent Labour)	Labour
Preseli	Dyfed	0	0	0	0	43	0	Independent
Radnor	Powys	0	0	0	0	31	0	Independent
Rhondda	Mid Glamorgan	0	30	0	1	0	2 (Note: 1 Ratepayers, 1 Communist)	Labour
Rhuddlan	Clwyd	9	4	1	0	22	0	Independent
Rhymney Valley	Mid Glamorgan	0	38	0	4	2	4	Labour
South Pembrokeshire	Dyfed	0	0	0	1	30	0	Independent
Swansea	West Glamorgan	12	30	1	0	3	5 (Note: 3 Independent Ratepayers, 2 Ratepayers)	Labour
Taff-Ely	Mid Glamorgan	0	30	4	2	7	4	Labour
Torfaen	Gwent	0	36	0	0	2	5 (Note: 3 Rent and Ratepayers, Communist 2)	Labour
Vale of Glamorgan	South Glamorgan	15	23	0	0	11	0	No overall control (Conservative-Independent)
Wrexham Maelor	Clwyd	4	24	2	1	14	0	Labour
Ynys Môn (Anglesey)	Gwynedd	0	4	0	0	41	0	Independent

==== Non-metropolitan districts ====
===== Avon =====
Council	Con	Lab	Lib	Ind	Others	Control	Details
Bath	19	17	9	0	0	No overall control	Details
Bristol	25	56	3	0	0	Labour	Details
Kingswood	4	19	6	6	10	No overall control	Details
Northavon	26	19	1	1	3 (Note: 1 Residents Association, 2 vacancies)	No overall control	Details
Wansdyke	12	22	0	11	0	No overall control (Conservative-Independent)	Details
Woodspring	40	10	3	8	0	Conservative	Details

===== Bedfordshire =====
Council	Con	Lab	Lib	Ind	Control	Details
Bedford	20	22	2	12	No overall control (Conservative-Independent)	Details
Luton	12	30	6	0	Labour	Details
Mid Bedfordshire	5	8	1	35	Independent	Details
South Bedfordshire	17	13	8	7	No overall control	Details

===== Berkshire =====
Council	Con	Lab	Lib	Ind	Others	Control	Details
Bracknell	9	17	1	1	3 (Note: Ratepayers)	Labour	Details
Newbury	10	1	24	22	0	No overall control	Details
Reading	16	16	14	0	0	No overall control	Details
Slough	2	34	4	0	0	Labour	Details
Windsor and Maidenhead	53	3	0	3	0	Conservative	Details
Wokingham	23	0	13	15	1	No overall control (Conservative-Independent)	Details

===== Buckinghamshire =====
Council	Con	Lab	Lib	Ind	Others	Control	Details
Aylesbury Vale	10	12	1	31	0	Independent	Details
Beaconsfield	27	1	3	9	2	Conservative	Details
Chiltern	26	11	0	7	7 (Note: 4 Residents, 3 Ratepayers)	Conservative	Details
Milton Keynes	8	27	0	5	0	Labour	Details
Wycombe	30	12	3	10	4	Conservative	Details

===== Cambridgeshire =====
Council	Con	Lab	Lib	Ind	Others	Control	Details
Cambridge	11	26	5	0	0	Labour	Details
East Cambridgeshire	0	1	0	33	1 (Note: Vacancy)	Independent	Details
Fenland	18	8	0	14	0	No overall control (Conservative-Independent)	Details
Huntingdon	15	9	0	26	0	Independent	Details
Peterborough	19	28	1	0	0	Labour	Details
South Cambridgeshire	0	7	3	43	0	Independent	Details

===== Cheshire =====
Council	Con	Lab	Lib	Ind	Others	Control	Details
Chester	43	15	0	4	0	Conservative	Details
Congleton	20	12	1	11	1 (Note: Ratepayers)	No overall control	Details
Crewe	2	35	2	21	0	Labour	Details
Ellesmere Port	14	27	0	1	0	Labour	Details
Halton	8	30	1	3	1 (Note: Moderate Party)	Labour	Details
Macclesfield	25	10	10	12	5	No overall control	Details
Vale Royal	10	16	6	25	0	No overall control (Independent-Conservative)	Details
Warrington	32	22	3	3	0	Conservative	Details

===== Cleveland =====
Council	Con	Lab	Ind	Control	Details
Hartlepool	15	30	1	Labour	Details
Langbaurgh	27	32	5	No overall control	Details
Middlesbrough	17	39	0	Labour	Details
Stockton-on-Tees	25	33	2	Labour	Details

===== Cornwall =====
Council	Con	Lab	Lib	Ind	Control	Details
Caradon	0	0	0	41	Independent	Details
Carrick	4	5	4	32	Independent	Details
Kerrier	5	3	0	34	Independent	Details
North Cornwall	0	0	3	23	Independent	Details
Penwith	0	1	1	38	Independent	Details
Restormel	0	0	2	36	Independent	Details

===== Cumbria =====
Council	Con	Lab	Lib	Ind	Others	Control	Details
Allerdale	4	25	0	27	0	No overall control (Independent-Conservative)	Details
Barrow-in-Furness	6	25	0	2	0	Labour	Details
Carlisle	12	25	1	10	0	Labour	Details
Copeland	6	30	0	12	0	Labour	Details
Eden	0	0	0	37	0	Independent	Details
South Lakeland	7	2	7	37	1 (Note: Independent Conservative)	Independent	Details

===== Derbyshire =====
Council	Con	Lab	Lib	Ind	Others	Control	Details
Amber Valley	4	32	3	0	21	Labour	Details
Bolsover	1	28	0	4	3	Labour	Details
Chesterfield	7	45	2	0	0	Labour	Details
Derby	14	34	6	0	0	Labour	Details
Erewash	9	36	5	4	0	Labour	Details
High Peak	23	11	2	10	0	No overall control (Conservative-Independent)	Details
North East Derbyshire	10	32	0	9	0	Labour	Details
South Derbyshire	4	18	0	13	0	Labour	Details
West Derbyshire	18	5	4	13	0	No overall control (Conservative-Independent)	Details

===== Devon =====
Council	Con	Lab	Lib	Ind	Others	Control	Details
East Devon	14	1	3	42	0	Independent	Details
Exeter	14	13	6	1	0	No overall control	
North Devon	0	1	15	28	0	Independent	Details
Plymouth	37	29	0	0	0	Conservative	Details
South Hams	2	0	0	40	0	Independent	Details
Teignbridge	0	7	0	48	1 (Note: Independent Trade Unionist)	Independent	Details
Tiverton	0	3	5	32	0	Independent	Details
Torbay	30	6	0	0	0	Conservative	Details
Torridge	0	1	6	29	0	Independent	Details
West Devon	0	0	0	30	0	Independent	Details

===== Dorset =====
Council	Con	Lab	Lib	Ind	Others	Control	Details
Bournemouth	38	14	3	2	0	Conservative	Details
Christchurch	10	4	5	1	0	No overall control (Conservative-Independent)	Details
North Dorset	0	0	4	27	0	Independent	Details
Poole	22	3	9	2	0	Conservative	Details
Purbeck	5	3	0	13	0	Independent	Details
West Dorset	0	2	9	44	0	Independent	Details
Weymouth and Portland	18	21	0	0	0	Labour	Details
Wimborne	2	0	9	21	1 (Note: Vacancy)	Independent	Details

===== Durham =====
Council	Con	Lab	Lib	Ind	Others	Control	Details
Chester-le-Street	0	23	6	4	0	Labour	Details
Darlington	8	28	8	5	0	Labour	Details
Derwentside	1	45	5	3	3	Labour	Details
Durham	0	40	7	14	0	Labour	Details
Easington	0	56	0	3	1 (Note: Independent Labour)	Labour	Details
Sedgefield	1	40	4	8	0	Labour	Details
Teesdale	0	0	0	29	0	Independent	Details
Wear Valley	0	21	9	10	1 (Note: People's Representative)	Labour	Details

===== East Sussex =====
Council	Con	Lab	Lib	Ind	Others	Control	Details
Brighton	31	28	0	0	0	Conservative	Details
Eastbourne	10	4	19	0	0	Liberal	Details
Hastings	12	11	9	1	0	No overall control	Details
Hove	24	6	0	3	3 (Note: Vacancies)	Conservative	Details
Lewes	26	10	0	6	5 (Note: Ratepayers)	Conservative	Details
Rother	9	5	1	30	0	Independent	Details
Wealden	25	1	2	23	5	No overall control (Conservative-Independent)	Details

===== Essex =====
Council	Con	Lab	Lib	Ind	Others	Control	Details
Basildon	9	31	0	0	6	Labour	Details
Braintree	14	19	1	21	1 (Note: Ratepayers)	No overall control (Independent-Conservative)	Details
Brentwood	24	11	1	2	0	Conservative	Details
Castle Point	19	20	0	0	0	Labour	Details
Chelmsford	31	16	8	5	0	Conservative	Details
Colchester	28	27	1	4	0	No overall control (Conservative-Independent)	Details
Epping Forest	44	10	0	5	0	Conservative	Details
Harlow	0	38	4	0	0	Labour	Details
Maldon	9	4	3	14	0	No overall control	Details
Rochford	19	12	1	8	0	No overall control	Details
Southend-on-Sea	24	13	11	0	0	No overall control	Details
Tendring	31	4	11	11	3	Conservative	Details
Thurrock	13	33	0	3	0	Labour	Details
Uttlesford	21	7	2	12	0	No overall control (Conservative-Independent)	Details

===== Gloucestershire =====
Council	Con	Lab	Lib	Ind	Others	Control	Details
Cheltenham	21	7	4	2	2 (Note: Ratepayers)	Conservative	Details
Cotswold	1	2	0	42	0	Independent	Details
Forest of Dean	0	21	1	25	0	No overall control	Details
Gloucester	21	12	0	0	0	Conservative	Details
Stroud	14	14 (Note: Including 2 Labour & Co-Operative)	8	17	3 (Note: Vacancies)	No overall control	Details
Tewkesbury	22	0	3	26	0	Independent	Details

===== Hampshire =====
Council	Con	Lab	Lib	Ind	Others	Control	Details
Basingstoke	18	14	3	20	0	No overall control (Independent-Conservative)	Details
Eastleigh	13	20	5	4	0	No overall control	Details
Fareham	16	2	5	2	11 (Note: Ratepayers)	No overall control (Conservative-Ratepayers)	Details
Gosport	9	19	0	2	1	Labour	Details
Hartley Wintney	7	0	0	23	3	Independent	Details
Havant	8	8	10	4	12	No overall control	Details
New Forest	12	1	5	37	3	Independent	Details
Petersfield	16	6	0	20	0	No overall control	Details
Portsmouth	28	17	0	3	0	Conservative	Details
Rushmoor	20	9	7	0	7	No overall control	Details
Southampton	20	31	0	0	0	Labour	Details
Test Valley	10	5	7	21	0	No overall control	Details
Winchester	14	5	5	25	2 (Note: 1 Ratepayers, 1 Tenants)	No overall control (Conservative-Independent)	Details

===== Hereford and Worcester =====
Council	Con	Lab	Lib	Ind	Others	Control	Details
Bromsgrove	25	13	0	0	4 (Note: Ratepayers)	Conservative	Details
Hereford	0	10	8	3	3 (Note: Independent Conservative)	No overall control	Details
Leominster	1	2	0	33	0	Independent	Details
Malvern Hills	1	2	11	8	23	No overall control	Details
Redditch	6	19	0	0	0	No overall control	Details
South Herefordshire	1	0	0	35	0	Independent	Details
Worcester	18	18	0	0	0	No overall control	Details
Wychavon	10	4	2	29	0	Independent	Details
Wyre Forest	30	20	9	1	2	No overall control	Details

===== Hertfordshire =====
Council	Con	Lab	Lib	Ind	Others	Control	Details
Broxbourne	28	12	0	0	0	Conservative	Details
Dacorum	26	33	0	3	0	Labour	Details
East Hertfordshire	16	10	0	16	6	No overall control (Conservative-Independent)	Details
Hertsmere	25	17	13	0	0	No overall control	Details
North Hertfordshire	23	17	0	7	1 (Note: Ratepayers)	No overall control	Details
St Albans	32	14	7	1	0	Conservative	Details
Stevenage	3	31	0	0	0	Labour	Details
Three Rivers	19	12	13	0	0	No overall control	Details
Watford	9	21	6	0	0	Labour	Details
Welwyn Hatfield	19	24	0	0	0	Labour	Details

===== Humberside =====
Council	Con	Lab	Lib	Ind	Others	Control	Details
Beverley	16	1	7	36	0	Independent	Details
Boothferry	4	5	0	26	0	Independent	Details
Cleethorpes	9	14	6	19	0	No overall control (Independent-Conservative)	Details
Glanford	0	1	0	33	0	Independent	Details
Grimsby	14	20	7	1	0	No overall control	Details
Holderness	0	0	0	29	0	Independent	Details
Kingston upon Hull	8	55	0	0	0	Labour	Details
North Wolds	3	2	1	37	0	Independent	Details
Scunthorpe	4	35	0	0	1 (Note: Independent Labour)	Labour	Details

===== Isle of Wight =====
Council	Con	Lab	Lib	Ind	Others	Control	Details
Medina	3	10	4	13	3 (Note: Ratepayers)	No overall control	Details
South Wight	1	0	1	22	0	Independent	Details

===== Kent =====
Council	Con	Lab	Lib	Ind	Others	Control	Details
Ashford	22	8	10	4	0	No overall control (Conservative-Independent)	Details
Canterbury	34	5	2	5	3 (Note: Ratepayers)	Conservative	Details
Dartford	14	30	0	0	0	Labour	Details
Dover	29	21	0	5	0	Conservative	Details
Gillingham	13	14	8	0	0	No overall control	Details
Gravesham	15	28	0	0	1	Labour	Details
Maidstone	13	12	19	9	7	No overall control	Details
Medway	22	32	5	0	0	Labour	Details
Sevenoaks	28	6	6	14	0	Conservative	Details
Shepway	33	12	1	8	0	Conservative	Details
Swale	17	25	3	5	0	No overall control	Details
Thanet	33	14	5	11	0	Conservative	Details
Tonbridge and Malling	30	11	8	4	0	Conservative	Details
Tunbridge Wells	29	7	2	9	0	Conservative	Details

===== Lancashire =====
Council	Con	Lab	Lib	Ind	Others	Control	Details
Blackburn	19	27	11	3	0	No overall control	Details
Blackpool	40	10	3	3	0	Conservative	Details
Burnley	12	39	1	2	0	Labour	Details
Chorley	17	21	0	7	2 (Note: Independent Labour)	No overall control	Details
Fylde	28	2	2	4	9	Conservative	Details
Hyndburn	21	24	3	0	0	No overall control	Details
Lancaster	34	17	1	4	3 (Note: Ratepayers)	Conservative	Details
Pendle	6	19	23	2	7	No overall control	Details
Preston	19	38	0	0	0	Labour	Details
Ribble Valley	30	1	0	7	0	Conservative	Details
Rossendale	17	15	4	0	0	No overall control	Details
South Ribble	30	16	2	1	0	Conservative	Details
West Lancashire	10	23	3	14	0	No overall control	Details
Wyre	45	2	0	8	0	Conservative	Details

===== Leicestershire =====
Council	Con	Lab	Lib	Ind	Others	Control	Details
Blaby	8	0	7	20	0	Independent	Details
Bosworth	4	14	8	13	0	No overall control	Details
Charnwood	28	14	5	13	0	No overall control (Conservative-Independent)	Details
Harborough	37	28	2	0	0	Conservative	Details
Leicester	11	37	0	0	0	Labour	Details
Melton	12	2	0	6	4	No overall control	Details
North West Leicestershire	8	25	0	10	0	Labour	Details
Oadby and Wigston	18	7	5	3	0	Conservative	Details
Rutland	0	0	0	20	0	Independent	Details

===== Lincolnshire =====
Council	Con	Lab	Lib	Ind	Others	Control	Details
Boston	9	5	5	15	0	No overall control (Independent-Conservative)	Details
East Lindsey	5	1	3	5	44 (Note: 2 Independent Conservative, 42 others)	Non Party	Details
Lincoln	6	1	0	3	20 (Note: Democratic Labour)	Democratic Labour	Details
North Kesteven	8	2	0	27	0	Independent	Details
South Holland	6	2	0	27	0	Independent	Details
South Kesteven	13	12	0	9	21	No overall control	Details
West Lindsey	1	5	6	25	0	Independent	Details

===== Norfolk =====
Council	Con	Lab	Lib	Ind	Others	Control	Details
Breckland	19	10	0	21	1 (Note: Independent Conservative)	No overall control (Independent-Conservative)	Details
Broadland	19	6	0	24	0	No overall control (Independent-Conservative)	Details
Great Yarmouth	26	17	2	3	0	Conservative	Details
Norwich	11	37	0	0	0	Labour	Details
Pastonacres	6	4	0	37	0	Independent	Details
South Norfolk	6	7	1	33	0	Independent	Details
West Norfolk	14	22	0	24	0	No overall control (Independent-Conservative)	Details

===== North Yorkshire =====
Council	Con	Lab	Lib	Ind	Others	Control	Details
Craven	14	6	9	6	0	No overall control (Conservative-Independent)	Details
Hambleton	4	1	1	42	0	Independent	Details
Harrogate	35	2	15	7	1 (Note: Vacancy)	Conservative	Details
Richmondshire	0	0	0	35	0	Independent	Details
Ryedale	0	5	0	40	0	Independent	Details
Scarborough	15	5	11	16	1	No overall control	Details
Selby	16	7	0	20	1	Independent	Details
York	17	17	5	0	0	No overall control	Details

===== Northamptonshire =====
Council	Con	Lab	Lib	Ind	Others	Control	Details
Corby	1	29	0	2	1 (Note: Independent Socialist)	Labour	Details
Daventry	16	9	0	10	0	No overall control (Conservative-Independent)	Details
East Northamptonshire	5	14	0	0	17	No overall control	Details
Kettering	14	16	7	8	0	No overall control	Details
Northampton	23	25	0	0	0	Labour	Details
South Northamptonshire	15	2	2	17	0	No overall control (Independent-Conservative)	Details
Wellingborough	14	13	0	5	1 (Note: Ratepayers)	No overall control	Details

===== Northumberland =====
Council	Con	Lab	Lib	Ind	Others	Control	Details
Alnwick	0	4	0	24	0	Independent	Details
Berwick-upon-Tweed	0	2	0	26	0	Independent	Details
Blyth Valley	5	29	12	12	2	Labour	Details
Castle Morpeth	11	7	2	13	1 (Note: Ratepayers)	No overall control (Independent-Conservative)	Details
Tynedale	4	10	3	25	3	Independent	Details
Wansbeck	0	44	0	1	0	Labour	Details

===== Nottinghamshire =====
Council	Con	Lab	Ind	Others	Control	Details
Ashfield	1	52	2	0	Labour	Details
Bassetlaw	11	29	10	1	Labour	Details
Broxtowe	24	20	1	1 (Note: Socialist Independent)	Conservative	Details
Gedling	32	19	0	4 (Note: Independent Ratepayers)	Conservative	Details
Mansfield	7	38	0	0	Labour	Details
Newark	20	29	3	0	Labour	Details
Nottingham	10	44	0	0	Labour	Details
Rushcliffe	42	3	3	1	Conservative	Details

===== Oxfordshire =====
Council	Con	Lab	Lib	Ind	Others	Control	Details
Cherwell	15	16	0	14	0	No overall control (Conservative-Independent)	Details
Oxford	12	30	3	0	0	Labour	Details
Vale of White Horse	27	8	3	10	0	Conservative	Details
Wallingford	25	9	7	20	1 (Note: Progressive Independent)	No overall control (Conservative-Independent)	Details
West Oxfordshire	1	7	1	35	1 (Note: Independent Liberal)	Independent	Details

===== Salop =====
Council	Con	Lab	Lib	Ind	Others	Control	Details
Bridgnorth	0	0	1	31	0	Independent	Details
North Shropshire	0	1	2	36	0	Independent	Details
Oswestry	0	1	3	18	0	Independent	Details
Shrewsbury	12	15	7	11	0	No overall control	Details
South Shropshire	0	0	1	35	0	Independent	Details
Wrekin	8	32	0	14	1 (Note: Independent Labour)	Labour	Details

===== Somerset =====
Council	Con	Lab	Lib	Ind	Others	Control	Details
Mendip	11	7	2	23	1 (Note: Vacancy)	Independent	Details
Sedgemoor	19	14	3	12	0	No overall control	Details
Taunton Deane	21	14	0	13	0	No overall control	Details
West Somerset	3	1	1	27	0	Independent	Details
Yeovil	20	8	2	30	0	No overall control (Independent-Conservative)	Details

===== Staffordshire =====
Council	Con	Lab	Lib	Ind	Others	Control	Details
Cannock Chase	1	36	0	0	0	Labour	Details
East Staffordshire	22	24	0	14	0	No overall control (Conservative-Independent)	Details
Lichfield	17	25	0	11	1 (Note: Ratepayers)	No overall control	Details
Newcastle-under-Lyme	15	31	2	14	0	No overall control	Details
South Staffordshire	22	8	1	15	2	No overall control (Conservative-Independent)	Details
Stafford	18	15	0	23	1 (Note: Independent Labour)	No overall control	Details
Staffordshire Moorlands	12	14	2	26	0	No overall control (Independent minority)	Details
Stoke-on-Trent	8	60	3	1	0	Labour	Details
Tamworth	0	18	0	6	0	Labour	Details

===== Suffolk =====
Council	Con	Lab	Lib	Ind	Others	Control	Details
Babergh	7	11	0	20	0	Independent	Details
Forest Heath	12	0	0	3	10 (Note: 9 others, 1 vacancy)	No overall control (Conservative-Independent)	Details
Ipswich	11	36	0	0	0	Labour	Details
Mid Suffolk	6	9	1	24	0	Independent	Details
St Edmundsbury	26	11	0	6	1 (Note: Independent Conservative)	Conservative	Details
Suffolk Coastal	27	9	0	18	1	No overall control	Details
Waveney	22	27	5	2	0	No overall control	Details

===== Surrey =====
Council	Con	Lab	Lib	Ind	Others	Control	Details
Elmbridge	39	7	5	0	14 (Note: Ratepayers)	Conservative	Details
Epsom and Ewell	0	3	0	0	37	Ratepayers	Details
Guildford	29	6	5	2	0	Conservative	Details
Mole Valley	16	3	5	9	9 (Note: Residents)	No overall control	Details
Reigate and Banstead	29	15	4	2	0	Conservative	Details
Runnymede	23	15	0	2	0	Conservative	Details
Spelthorne	39	13	0	0	0	Conservative	Details
Surrey Heath	35	0	0	1	0	Conservative	Details
Tandridge	26	3	10	3	0	Conservative	Details
Waverley	28	2	25	6	0	No overall control	Details
Woking	19	12	1	0	0	Conservative	Details

===== Warwickshire =====
Council	Con	Lab	Lib	Ind	Others	Control	Details
North Warwickshire	8	19	0	4	2 (Note: Ratepayers)	Labour	Details
Nuneaton	7	26	2	0	0	Labour	Details
Rugby	22	18	3	2	3	No overall control	Details
Stratford-on-Avon	15	2	5	32	0	Independent	Details
Warwick	26	25	7	0	0	No overall control	Details

===== West Sussex =====
Council	Con	Lab	Lib	Ind	Others	Control	Details
Adur	13	6	16	0	4 (Note: Shoreham Beach Residents Association)	No overall control	Details
Arun	33	4	4	5	1	Conservative	Details
Chichester	18	1	6	22	3 (Note: Residents)	No overall control	Details
Crawley	5	25	0	1	1 (Note: Ratepayers)	Labour	Details
Horsham	18	0	2	23	0	Independent	Details
Mid Sussex	25	3	5	21	0	No overall control (Conservative-Independent)	Details
Worthing	17	1	0	12	0	Conservative	Details

===== Wiltshire =====
Council	Con	Lab	Lib	Ind	Others	Control	Details
Kennet	7	0	2	28	0	Independent	Details
North Wiltshire	24	4	7	11	0	Conservative	Details
Salisbury	16	13	8	17	4 (Note: 2 Ratepayers, 2 vacancies)	No overall control	Details
Thamesdown	18	26	0	2	0	Labour	Details
West Wiltshire	13	10	2	17	0	No overall control (Independent-Conservative)	Details

=== Future elections ===
The next county council elections took place in 1977.

Future elections to Metropolitan District councils were to be by thirds, with the one third of seats being elected in 1975.

The next election of non-metropolitan district councils and Welsh district councils was to in 1976.

== Northern Ireland ==
Local government in Northern Ireland was reorganised in 1973 by the Local Government (Boundaries) Act (Northern Ireland) 1971 and the Local Government Act (Northern Ireland) 1972. The county councils, county borough and municipal borough corporations and urban and rural district councils were replaced by twenty-six Local Government districts. Elections took place for all the seats on the district councils on 30 May, and the councils came into their power in 1 October.

District	Official Unionist	Democratic Unionist	Vanguard Unionist	Loyalist Coalition	Independent Unionist	SDLP	Republican Clubs	Nationalist and Unity Parties	Alliance	Northern Ireland Labour Party	Others	Control
Antrim	8	1	1	0	1	1	0	0	2	0	Independent 2	NOC (Unionist)
Ards	11	0	0	1	1	0	0	0	2	1	Independent 1	Official Unionist
Armagh	10	2	0	0	1	4	1	0	1	0	Independent 1	NOC (Unionist)
Ballymena	9	5	1	0	0	0	0	0	1	0	Independent 2 Non-Party 3	NOC (Unionist)
Ballymoney	4	1	0	2	2	0	0	0	0	1	Independent 1 Non-Party 5	NOC
Banbridge	8	0	0	0	3	1	0	0	0	0	Independent 3	NOC (Unionist)
Belfast	25	2	1	0	2	7	2	0	8	2	Unionist Loyalist 2	NOC (Unionist)
Carrickfergus	5	0	0	0	0	0	0	0	1	0	Unionist Loyalist 5 Loyalist 1 Non-Party 1	NOC (Unionist)
Castlereagh	8	0	0	1	2	0	0	0	5	0	Unionist Loyalist 2 Independent 1	NOC (Unionist)
Coleraine	12	0	0	0	2	1	0	0	3	0	Independent 1 Non-party 1	Official Unionist
Cookstown	7	0	0	1	1	3	1	0	0	0	Independent 1 Non-Party 1	NOC (Unionist)
Craigavon	7	3	2	3	3	2	0	0	4	0	Independent 1	NOC (Unionist)
Down	8	0	1	0	0	8	0	0	2	0	Independent 1	NOC
Dungannon	11	0	0	0	0	5	0	Unity 2 Republican 2	0	0	0	Official Unionist
Fermanagh	5	0	0	0	3	4	0	Unity 4	0	0	Independent 1 Unionist Unity 2 Non-Party 1	NOC
Larne	1	0	0	8	0	0	0	0	3	0	Independent 2 Non-Party 1	Loyalist
Limavady	0	0	0	0	0	4	0	0	2	0	United Unionists 8 Independent 1	United Unionists
Lisburn	14	4	1	0	0	1	0	0	3	0	0	Official Unionist
Londonderry	0	0	0	United Loyalists 9	0	10	1	Nationalist 3	0	0	0	NOC (Nationalist)
Magherafelt	4	0	1	United Loyalist 1	0	6	1	0	0	0	Independent 1	NOC
Moyle	4	0	0	0	1	2	0	0	0	0	Independent 5 Non-Party 4	NOC
Newry and Mourne	3	0	0	0	0	13	2	0	0	0	Non-Party 6 Independent 2	NOC
Newtownabbey	9	3	0	0	Unionist 3 United Loyalist 1 Loyalist 1	0	0	0	3	1	0	NOC (Unionist)
North Down	9	0	0	Loyalist 3	0	0	0	7	0	0	0	NOC
Omagh	6	0	0	0	Unionist Unity 2	4	0	Nationalist 1 Official Republican 1	0	0	3 Non-Party Community	NOC
Strabane	6	0	0	Unionist Coalition 1	0	4	0	0	0	0	Independent 2	NOC

== Scotland ==
Local elections were also held in Scotland in 1973. At the time of the election, Scotland was the only part of the UK in which local government had yet to be reformed, with the Local Government (Scotland) Act 1973 only receiving Royal Assent in October 1973. The election saw Labour maintaining their control of Aberdeen, Glasgow, and Dundee, although failing to make gains in Edinburgh.
