= 1973 Castle Point District Council election =

1973 English local government election

- 10 May 1973

All 39 seats to Castle Point District Council 20 seats needed for a majority

	First party	Second party
Party	Labour	Conservative
Seats won	20	19
Popular vote	31,104	35,194
Percentage	45.2%	52.5%
Council control after election
Labour

The 1973 Castle Point District Council election took place on 10 May 1973 to elect members of Castle Point District Council in Essex, England. This was on the same day as other local elections.

This was the inaugural election to the council following its formation by the 1972 Local Government Act.

== Summary ==
=== Election result ===
1973 Castle Point District Council election
Party	Candidates	Seats	Gains	Losses	Net gain/loss	Seats %	Votes %	Votes	+/−
Labour	39	20	N/A	N/A	N/A	51.3	45.2	31,104	N/A
Conservative	39	19	N/A	N/A	N/A	48.7	52.5	36,194	N/A
Independent	2	0	N/A	N/A	N/A	0.0	1.4	958	N/A
Independent Labour	1	0	N/A	N/A	N/A	0.0	0.9	623	N/A
