= 1973 Suffolk County Council election =

1973 English local election

- 12 April 1973

All 82 seats to Suffolk County Council 42 seats needed for a majority

	First party	Second party
Party	Conservative	Labour
Seats won	47	29
Popular vote	80,983	72,647
Percentage	48.5%	43.5%
	Third party	Fourth party
Party	Liberal	Independent
Seats won	3	3
Popular vote	6,983	5,246
Percentage	4.2%	3.1%
Council control after election
Conservative

The 1973 Suffolk County Council election took place on 12 April 1973 to elect members of Suffolk County Council in Suffolk, England. It was held on the same day as other local elections.

This was the first election to Suffolk County Council following the structural reforms to local government laid out in the Local Government Act 1972.

== Summary ==
=== Election result ===
1973 Suffolk County Council election
Party	Candidates	Seats	Gains	Losses	Net gain/loss	Seats %	Votes %	Votes	+/−
Conservative	75	47	N/A	N/A	N/A	57.3	48.5	80,983	
Labour	80	29	N/A	N/A	N/A	35.4	43.5	72,647	
Liberal	12	3	N/A	N/A	N/A	3.7	4.2	6,983	
Independent	9	3	N/A	N/A	N/A	3.7	3.1	5,246	
Ind. Conservative	4	0	N/A	N/A	N/A	0.0	0.8	1,278	

== Results by Division (A-Z) ==
=== Aldeburgh ===
Aldeburgh
Party	Candidate	Votes	%
Conservative	Ms C Cowley	1,171	64.6
Labour	A Telford	641	35.4
Majority		530	29.2
Turnout		1812	41.1
Conservative win (new seat)			

=== Beccles ===
Beccles
Party	Candidate	Votes	%
Conservative	H Condor	2,263	57.1
Conservative	G Haworth	2,085	52.6
Labour	H Ley	1,816	45.8
Labour	G Westwood	1,759	44.4
Turnout		3962	46.3
Conservative win (new seat)			
Conservative win (new seat)			

=== Blyth No.1 ===
Blyth No.1
Party	Candidate	Votes	%
Conservative	C Bernard	1,036	53.3
Liberal	Ms S Stockbridge	508	26.2
Labour	E Langley	398	20.5
Majority		528	27.1
Turnout		1942	46.6
Conservative win (new seat)			

=== Blyth No.2 ===
Blyth No.2
Party	Candidate	Votes	%
Conservative	R Hickson	1,176	68.7
Labour	R Leech	537	31.3
Majority		639	37.4
Turnout		1713	41.0
Conservative win (new seat)			

=== Blyth No.3 ===
Blyth No.3
Party	Candidate	Votes	%
Conservative	Ms A De Segundo	997	48.8
Liberal	D Newby	655	32.1
Labour	Ms E Evans	390	19.1
Majority		342	16.7
Turnout		2042	49.1
Conservative win (new seat)			

=== Bungay ===
Bungay
Party	Candidate	Votes	%
Liberal	P Hancock	980	41.2
Conservative	A Berkley-Smith	737	31.0
Labour	R Seamons	659	27.7
Majority		243	10.2
Turnout		2376	56.3
Liberal win (new seat)			

=== Bury St Edmunds Abbeygate ===
Bury St Edmunds Abbeygate
Party	Candidate	Votes	%
Conservative	J Knight	1,071	60.1
Labour	Ms R Yates	712	39.9
Majority		359	20.2
Turnout		1783	41.9
Conservative win (new seat)			

=== Bury St Edmunds Northgate ===
Bury St Edmunds Northgate
Party	Candidate	Votes	%
Labour	A Miller	1,338	65.3
Conservative	E Spooner	712	34.7
Majority		626	30.6
Turnout		2050	37.5
Labour win (new seat)			

=== Bury St Edmunds Risbygate ===
Bury St Edmunds Risbygate
Party	Candidate	Votes	%
Conservative	N Wilson	1,287	59.8
Labour	D Lockwood	864	40.2
Majority		423	19.6
Turnout		2151	48.5
Conservative win (new seat)			

=== Bury St Edmunds Southgate ===
Bury St Edmunds Southgate
Party	Candidate	Votes	%
Conservative	Ms M Macrae	1,350	59.6
Labour	M Hayes	1,070	44.2
Majority		280	15.4
Turnout		2420	48.4
Conservative win (new seat)			

=== Clare No.1 ===
Clare No.1
Party	Candidate	Votes	%
Conservative	R Ryder	1,631	59.6
Labour	J Hartley	1,104	40.4
Majority		527	19.2
Turnout		2735	48.3
Conservative win (new seat)			

=== Clare No.2 ===
Clare No.2
Party	Candidate	Votes	%
Conservative	Ms R Simpson	1,604	69.6
Labour	K Sleat	699	30.4
Majority		905	39.2
Turnout		2303	42.3
Conservative win (new seat)			

=== Cosford No.1 ===
Cosford No.1
Party	Candidate	Votes	%
Conservative	A Dunn	1,093	60.4
Labour	Ms B Shuttleworth	717	39.6
Majority		376	20.8
Turnout		1810	50.7
Conservative win (new seat)			

=== Cosford No.2 ===
Cosford No.2
Party	Candidate	Votes	%
Conservative	Ms M Wheeler	981	80.3
Labour	M Peters	241	19.7
Majority		740	60.6
Turnout		1222	27.0
Conservative win (new seat)			

=== Deben No.1 ===
Deben No.1
Party	Candidate	Votes	%
Conservative	C Smith	1,273	57.1
Labour	J Reeve	957	42.9
Majority		316	14.2
Turnout		2230	48.5
Conservative win (new seat)			

=== Deben No.2 ===
Deben No.2
Party	Candidate	Votes	%
Conservative	R Sheepshanks	777	45.9
Labour	Ms J Oglethorpe	680	40.2
Liberal	J Archer	235	13.9
Majority		97	5.7
Turnout		1692	40.5
Conservative win (new seat)			

=== Deben No.3 ===
Deben No.3
Party	Candidate	Votes	%
Conservative	Ms J Bull	1,202	77.4
Labour	P Clarke	351	22.6
Majority		851	54.8
Turnout		1553	32.2
Conservative win (new seat)			

=== Deben No.4 ===
Deben No.4
Party	Candidate	Votes	%
Conservative	I Jacob	1,001	50.5
Liberal	V Gordon	619	31.2
Labour	D Rule	361	18.2
Majority		382	19.3
Turnout		1981	45.8
Conservative win (new seat)			

=== Deben No.5 ===
Deben No.5
Party	Candidate	Votes	%
Conservative	G Pipe	712	48.0
Independent	C Shute	472	31.8
Labour	R Tucker	299	20.2
Majority		240	16.2
Turnout		1483	25.2
Conservative win (new seat)			

=== Felixstowe North ===
Felixstowe North
Party	Candidate	Votes	%
Conservative	A Sherlock	826	57.6
Labour	S Knight	608	42.4
Majority		218	15.2
Turnout		1434	42.5
Conservative win (new seat)			

=== Felixstowe East & South East ===
Felixstowe East & South East
Party	Candidate	Votes	%
Liberal	D Houseley	1,012	45.1
Conservative	J Rowland	1,005	44.8
Labour	F Bowling	225	10.0
Majority		7	0.3
Turnout		2242	43.7
Liberal win (new seat)			

=== Felixstowe South & West ===
Felixstowe South & West
Party	Candidate	Votes	%
Labour	F Runnacles	1,132	53.7
Conservative	W Pedelty	976	46.3
Majority		156	7.4
Turnout		2108	38.6
Labour win (new seat)			

=== Gipping No.1 ===
Gipping No.1
Party	Candidate	Votes	%
Labour	G Cunningham	898	53.2
Conservative	Ms L Macrow	789	46.8
Majority		109	6.4
Turnout		1687	36.2
Labour win (new seat)			

=== Gipping No.2 ===
Gipping No.2
Party	Candidate	Votes	%
Conservative	A Foord	900	52.2
Labour	H Phillips	825	47.8
Majority		75	4.4
Turnout		1725	40.6
Conservative win (new seat)			

=== Gipping No.3 ===
Gipping No.3
Party	Candidate	Votes	%
Labour	J Turner	1,025	56.8
Liberal	S Wilson	778	43.2
Majority		247	13.6
Turnout		1803	42.3
Labour win (new seat)			

=== Gipping No.4 ===
Gipping No.4
Party	Candidate	Votes	%
Conservative	N Eaton	1,079	62.9
Labour	E Erbe	637	37.1
Majority		442	25.8
Turnout		1716	40.7
Conservative win (new seat)			

=== Hadleigh ===
Hadleigh
Party	Candidate	Votes	%
Labour	L Widdicombe	Unopposed	N/A
Majority		N/A	N/A
Turnout		N/A	N/A
Labour win (new seat)			

=== Halesworth ===
Halesworth
Party	Candidate	Votes	%
Conservative	M Tomkin	830	36.4
Labour	E Leverett	769	33.7
Independent	D Newby	680	29.8
Majority		61	2.7
Turnout		2279	53.1
Conservative win (new seat)			

=== Hartismere No.1 ===
Hartismere No.1
Party	Candidate	Votes	%
Independent	W Wickett	544	44.4
Independent	W Braybrooke	263	21.5
Independent	G Beak	241	19.7
Labour	S Bugg	178	14.5
Majority		281	22.9
Turnout		1226	27.3
Independent win (new seat)			

=== Hartismere No.2 ===
Hartismere No.2
Party	Candidate	Votes	%
Conservative	R Harvey	809	42.5
Labour	C Flatman	801	42.1
Independent	M Wilkinson	294	15.4
Majority		8	0.4
Turnout		1904	40.6
Conservative win (new seat)			

=== Hartismere No.3 ===
Hartimsere No.3
Party	Candidate	Votes	%
Conservative	J Leader	886	38.6
Independent	S Hawes	884	38.5
Labour	Ms E Deighton	526	22.9
Majority		2	0.1
Turnout		2296	50.3
Conservative win (new seat)			

=== Haverhill ===
Haverhill
Party	Candidate	Votes	%
Labour	Ms E Elkins	1,084	60.4
Conservative	Ms J Newman	710	39.6
Majority		374	20.8
Turnout		1794	30.4
Labour win (new seat)			

=== Ipswich Bixley ===
Ipswich Bixley
Party	Candidate	Votes	%
Conservative	C Jones	1,721	67.8
Conservative	D Farthing	1,712	67.5
Labour	Ms B James	732	28.9
Labour	P Ross	684	27.0
Independent	R Beaumont	224	8.8
Turnout		2537	38.5
Conservative win (new seat)			
Conservative win (new seat)			

=== Ipswich Bridge ===
Ipswich Bridge
Party	Candidate	Votes	%
Labour	V Girling	1,556	64.6
Labour	P Barker	1,416	58.8
Conservative	J Roll	921	38.3
Conservative	P Claxton	921	38.3
Turnout		2407	30.4
Labour win (new seat)			
Labour win (new seat)			

=== Ipswich Broom Hill ===
Ipswich Broom Hill
Party	Candidate	Votes	%
Conservative	D Dyer	1,092	68.3
Labour	T Gondris	508	31.7
Majority		584	36.6
Turnout		1600	32.5
Conservative win (new seat)			

=== Ipswich Chantry ===
Ipswich Chantry
Party	Candidate	Votes	%
Labour	Ms A Ross	1,928	77.3
Labour	M Cartwright	1,837	73.6
Conservative	Ms O Cook	644	25.8
Conservative	G Hunting	580	23.2
Turnout		2495	24.8
Labour win (new seat)			
Labour win (new seat)			

=== Ipswich Gainsborough ===
Ipswich Gainsborough
Party	Candidate	Votes	%
Labour	T Lambert	1,656	76.8
Conservative	Ms S Mooney	500	23.2
Majority		1156	53.6
Turnout		2156	37.0
Labour win (new seat)			

=== Ipswich Middle ===
Ipswich Middle
Party	Candidate	Votes	%
Labour	P Koppel	724	45.3
Conservative	A Rampling	562	35.2
Liberal	M Hunter	312	19.5
Majority		162	10.1
Turnout		1598	42.0
Labour win (new seat)			

=== Ipswich Racecourse ===
Ipswich Racecourse
Party	Candidate	Votes	%
Labour	C James	1,162	76.0
Conservative	C Harrison	356	24.0
Majority		806	52.0
Turnout		1518	30.4
Labour win (new seat)			

=== Ipswich Rushmere ===
Ipswich Rushmere
Party	Candidate	Votes	%
Labour	L Grimwood	1,581	51.7
Conservative	W Carley	1,478	48.3
Majority		103	3.4
Turnout		3059	49.3
Labour win (new seat)			

=== Ipswich St Clements ===
Ipswich St Clements
Party	Candidate	Votes	%
Labour	G Leverett	1,297	53.1
Conservative	A Ladbrooke	1,144	46.9
Majority		153	6.2
Turnout		2441	46.3
Labour win (new seat)			

=== Ipswich St Johns ===
Ipswich St Johns
Party	Candidate	Votes	%
Labour	J Mowles	1,544	65.7
Conservative	J Cooper	805	34.3
Majority		739	31.4
Turnout		2349	45.5
Labour win (new seat)			

=== Ipswich St Margarets ===
Ipswich St Margarets
Party	Candidate	Votes	%
Conservative	H Davis	1,664	70.6
Labour	W Knowles	694	29.4
Majority		970	41.2
Turnout		2358	38.1
Conservative win (new seat)			

=== Ipswich Valley ===
Ipswich Valley
Party	Candidate	Votes	%
Labour	J Watkins	950	52.4
Conservative	G Parsons	863	47.6
Majority		87	4.8
Turnout		1813	40.0
Labour win (new seat)			

=== Ipswich Westbourne ===
Ipswich Westbourne
Party	Candidate	Votes	%
Labour	C Skinner	1,446	75.7
Conservative	D Rees	465	24.3
Majority		981	51.4
Turnout		1911	31.9
Labour win (new seat)			

=== Ipswich Whitton ===
Ipswich Whitton
Party	Candidate	Votes	%
Labour	F Wilding	1,910	69.3
Labour	Ms M Williams	1,739	63.1
Conservative	Ms B Barnoster	935	33.9
Conservative	Ms D Thomas	929	33.7
Turnout		2757	29.5
Labour win (new seat)			
Labour win (new seat)			

=== Leiston-Cum-Sizewell ===
Leiston-Cum-Sizewell
Party	Candidate	Votes	%
Conservative	F Barker	1,184	55.6
Labour	R Knight	785	36.9
Liberal	Ms P Waller	159	7.5
Majority		399	18.7
Turnout		2128	59.4
Conservative win (new seat)			

=== Lothingland No.1 ===
Lothingland No.1
Party	Candidate	Votes	%
Labour	Ms G Harrison	1,225	50.3
Conservative	S Simpson	1,211	49.7
Majority		14	0.6
Turnout		2436	58.8
Labour win (new seat)			

=== Lothingland No.2 ===
Lothingland No.2
Party	Candidate	Votes	%
Conservative	G Farmiloe	919	56.3
Labour	R Stirling	712	43.7
Majority		207	12.6
Turnout		1631	37.9
Conservative win (new seat)			

=== Lothingland No.3 ===
Lothingland No.3
Party	Candidate	Votes	%
Conservative	V Beales	935	51.6
Labour	R Beales	877	48.4
Majority		58	3.2
Turnout		1812	41.7
Conservative win (new seat)			

=== Lowestoft Carlton ===
Lowestoft Carlton
Party	Candidate	Votes	%
Labour	J Reynolds	1,339	55.9
Labour	L Davies	1,328	55.4
Conservative	C Scarles	1,103	46.0
Conservative	J Smith	1,023	42.7
Turnout		2397	32.1
Labour win (new seat)			
Labour win (new seat)			

=== Lowestoft Central & Waveney ===
Lowestoft Central & Waveney
Party	Candidate	Votes	%
Liberal	H Sparham	776	55.8
Labour	Ms M Hunt	615	44.2
Majority		161	11.6
Turnout		1391	39.0
Liberal win (new seat)			

=== Lowestoft Gunton ===
Lowestoft Gunton
Party	Candidate	Votes	%
Conservative	Ms J King	1,220	55.2
Labour	H Cleveland	991	44.8
Majority		229	10.4
Turnout		2211	36.4
Conservative win (new seat)			

=== Lowestoft Kirkley & St John ===
Lowestoft Kirkley & St John
Party	Candidate	Votes	%
Labour	F Jones	1,414	59.7
Conservative	R Denton	955	40.3
Majority		459	19.4
Turnout		2369	40.2
Labour win (new seat)			

=== Lowestoft Oulton ===
Lowestoft Oulton
Party	Candidate	Votes	%
Labour	T Chipperfield	1,690	52.6
Conservative	A Knights	1,523	47.4
Majority		167	5.2
Turnout		3213	44.5
Labour win (new seat)			

=== Lowestoft Pakefield ===
Lowestoft Pakefield
Party	Candidate	Votes	%
Labour	J Lark	1,261	62.4
Conservative	J Wollard	761	37.6
Majority		500	24.8
Turnout		2022	47.3
Labour win (new seat)			

=== Lowestoft Roman Hill ===
Lowestoft Roman Hill
Party	Candidate	Votes	%
Labour	Ms P Ramm	Unopposed	N/A
Majority		N/A	N/A
Turnout		N/A	N/A
Labour win (new seat)			

=== Melford No.1 ===
Melford No.1
Party	Candidate	Votes	%
Labour	M Cornish	1,043	54.0
Conservative	Ms S Byham	889	46.0
Majority		154	8.0
Turnout		1932	43.2
Labour win (new seat)			

=== Melford No.2 ===
Melford No.2
Party	Candidate	Votes	%
Conservative	J Rowley	1,425	72.1
Labour	D King	551	27.9
Majority		874	44.2
Turnout		1976	40.5
Conservative win (new seat)			

=== Melford No.3 ===
Melford No.3
Party	Candidate	Votes	%
Conservative	R Partridge	1,356	54.6
Labour	F Shinn	1,129	45.4
Majority		227	9.2
Turnout		2485	46.6
Conservative win (new seat)			

=== Mildenhall No.1 ===
Mildenhall No.1
Party	Candidate	Votes	%
Conservative	Ms D Haggar	1,486	69.7
Labour	M Newson	647	30.3
Majority		839	39.4
Turnout		2133	44.1
Conservative win (new seat)			

=== Mildenhall No.2 ===
Mildenhall No.2
Party	Candidate	Votes	%
Ind. Conservative	F Dannatt	710	67.3
Labour	P Wesley-Clark	345	32.7
Majority		365	34.6
Turnout		1055	17.7
Ind. Conservative win (new seat)			

=== Mildenhall No.3 ===
Mildenhall No.3
Party	Candidate	Votes	%
Conservative	F Bennett	822	74.3
Labour	E Smith	284	25.7
Majority		538	48.6
Turnout		1106	29.8
Conservative win (new seat)			

=== Newmarket No.1 ===
Newmarket No.1
Party	Candidate	Votes	%
Conservative	K Kemp-Turner	1,288	60.7
Labour	A Donovans	530	25.0
Independent	R Rolfe	235	11.1
Independent	F Hallam	69	3.3
Majority		758	35.7
Turnout		2122	43.5
Conservative win (new seat)			

=== Newmarket No.2 ===
Newmarket No.2
Party	Candidate	Votes	%
Conservative	J Howell	1,120	59.8
Labour	A Bursford	489	26.1
Independent	W Sadler	264	14.1
Majority		631	33.7
Turnout		1873	39.3
Conservative win (new seat)			

=== Samford No.1 ===
Samford No.1
Party	Candidate	Votes	%
Conservative	Ms P Monroe	942	53.2
Labour	R Cook	828	46.8
Majority		114	6.4
Turnout		1770	40.1
Conservative win (new seat)			

=== Samford No.2 ===
Samford No.2
Party	Candidate	Votes	%
Conservative	R Harwood	1,164	65.2
Labour	R Pearce	621	34.8
Majority		543	30.4
Turnout		1785	35.5
Conservative win (new seat)			

=== Samford No.3 ===
Samford No.3
Party	Candidate	Votes	%
Conservative	L Kenyon	1,166	53.3
Labour	M Baker	1,020	46.7
Majority		146	6.6
Turnout		2186	48.9
Conservative win (new seat)			

=== Stowmarket ===
Stowmarket
Party	Candidate	Votes	%
Labour	G Soames	1,088	43.0
Conservative	D Sargison	756	29.9
Liberal	F Brooke	687	27.1
Majority		332	13.1
Turnout		2531	37.7
Labour win (new seat)			

=== Sudbury ===
Sudbury
Party	Candidate	Votes	%
Independent	A Herbert	1,644	58.0
Labour	W Aldworth	1,191	42.0
Majority		453	16.0
Turnout		2835	43.4
Independent win (new seat)			

=== Thedwastre No.1 ===
Thedwastre No.1
Party	Candidate	Votes	%
Conservative	D Erskine	1,112	74.2
Labour	J Whitehead	387	25.8
Majority		725	48.4
Turnout		1499	36.2
Conservative win (new seat)			

=== Thedwastre No.2 ===
Thedwastre No.2
Party	Candidate	Votes	%
Conservative	S Edwards	1,067	78.4
Labour	Ms J Grey	294	21.6
Majority		773	56.8
Turnout		1361	34.3
Conservative win (new seat)			

=== Thingoe No.1 ===
Thingoe No.1
Party	Candidate	Votes	%
Conservative	G Reeve	1,149	57.7
Labour	W Rayner	843	42.3
Majority		306	15.4
Turnout		1992	36.4
Conservative win (new seat)			

=== Thingoe No.2 ===
Thingoe No.2
Party	Candidate	Votes	%
Conservative	C Salton	1,189	75.7
Labour	R Nowak	382	24.3
Majority		807	51.4
Turnout		1571	34.5
Conservative win (new seat)			

=== Thingoe No.3 ===
Thingoe No.3
Party	Candidate	Votes	%
Conservative	Ms B Dunning	1,667	74.1
Labour	C Nicholas	584	25.9
Majority		1083	48.2
Turnout		2251	33.1
Conservative win (new seat)			

=== Woodbridge ===
Woodbridge
Party	Candidate	Votes	%
Conservative	A Daly-Briscoe	1,280	63.0
Labour	Ms D Davies	489	24.1
Liberal	J Cooper	262	12.9
Majority		791	38.9
Turnout		2031	38.4
Conservative win (new seat)			
