= 1973 St Albans City and District Council election =

1973 English local election

The 1973 St Albans City and District Council election took place on 7 June 1973 to elect members of St Albans City and District Council in England. This was on the same day as other local elections.

This was the inaugural election of St Albans City and District Council.

== Summary ==
1973 St Albans City and District Council election
Party	Seats	Gains	Losses	Net gain/loss	Seats %	Votes %	Votes	+/−
Conservative	32	N/A	N/A	N/A	59.3	49.1	55,376	N/A
Labour	14	N/A	N/A	N/A	25.9	31.3	35,286	N/A
Liberal	7	N/A	N/A	N/A	13.0	18.1	20,360	N/A
Independent	1	N/A	N/A	N/A	1.9	1.5	1,715	N/A
