= 1973 Leicester City Council election =

1973 English local election

The 1973 Leicester City Council election took place on 7 June 1973 to elect members of Leicester City Council in England. This was on the same day as other local elections.

This was the inaugural election of Leicester City Council.

== Summary ==
1973 Leicester City Council election
Party	Seats	Gains	Losses	Net gain/loss	Seats %	Votes %	Votes	+/−
Labour	37	N/A	N/A	N/A	77.1	45.6	79,679	N/A
Conservative	11	N/A	N/A	N/A	22.9	37.9	66,311	N/A
National Front	0	N/A	N/A	N/A	0.0	9.9	17,396	N/A
Liberal	0	N/A	N/A	N/A	0.0	5.2	9,022	N/A
EPSG	0	N/A	N/A	N/A	0.0	0.9	1,570	N/A
Independent Labour	0	N/A	N/A	N/A	0.0	0.3	566	N/A
Communist	0	N/A	N/A	N/A	0.0	0.2	353	N/A
