= 1973 Rochford District Council election =

UK local election

- 10 May 1973

All 40 seats to Rochford District Council 21 seats needed for a majority

	First party	Second party	Third party
Party	Conservative	Labour	Independent
Seats won	19	12	6
Popular vote	12,924	12,014	3,290
Percentage	43.7%	40.6%	11.1%
	Fourth party	Fifth party
Party	Residents	Liberal
Seats won	2	1
Popular vote	1,009	355
Percentage	3.4%	1.2%
Council control after election
No overall control

The 1973 Rochford District Council election took place on 10 May 1973 to elect members of Rochford District Council in Essex, England. This was on the same day as other local elections.

This was the inaugural election of the council following its formation by the Local Government Act 1972.

== Summary ==
=== Election result ===
1973 Rochford District Council election
Party	Candidates	Seats	Gains	Losses	Net gain/loss	Seats %	Votes %	Votes	+/−
Conservative	33	19	N/A	N/A	N/A	47.5	43.7	12,924	N/A
Labour	35	12	N/A	N/A	N/A	30.0	40.6	12,014	N/A
Independent	15	6	N/A	N/A	N/A	2.5	11.1	3,290	N/A
Residents	2	2	N/A	N/A	N/A	5.0	3.4	1,009	N/A
Liberal	1	1	N/A	N/A	N/A	2.5	1.2	355	N/A
