= 1973 Ipswich Borough Council election =

1973 English local government election

- 10 May 1973

All 47 seats to Ipswich Borough Council 24 seats needed for a majority
| | First party | Second party |
|---|---|---|
| Party | Labour | Conservative |
| Seats won | 36 | 11 |
| Popular vote | 49,784 | 31,007 |
| Percentage | 60.6% | 37.8% |
Council control after election
Labour

The 1973 Ipswich Borough Council election took place on 10 May 1973 to elect members to the Ipswich Borough Council in Suffolk, England. It was the inaugural election to the council after it was formed by the 1972 Local Government Act. This was on the same day as other local elections across the United Kingdom.

== Summary ==
=== Election result ===
1973 Ipswich Borough Council election
| Party | Candidates | Seats | Gains | Losses | Net gain/loss | Seats % | Votes % | Votes | +/− |
|---|---|---|---|---|---|---|---|---|---|
| Labour | 47 | 36 | N/A | N/A | N/A | 76.6 | 60.6 | 49,784 | N/A |
| Conservative | 34 | 11 | N/A | N/A | N/A | 23.4 | 37.8 | 31,007 | N/A |
| Liberal | 4 | 0 | N/A | N/A | N/A | 0.0 | 1.6 | 1,307 | N/A |

== Ward results ==
Incumbent councillors standing for re-election are marked with an asterisk (*). Changes in seats do not take into account defections.

=== Bixley ===
Bixley (4 seats)
| Party | Candidate | Votes | % |
|---|---|---|---|
| Conservative | C. Penn | 1,544 | 77.1 |
| Conservative | W. Mulley | 1,531 | 76.4 |
| Conservative | J. Shorten | 1,509 | 75.3 |
| Conservative | O. Nunn | 1,479 | 73.8 |
| Labour | C. James | 497 | 24.8 |
| Labour | P. Allan | 491 | 24.5 |
| Labour | K. Cartwright | 490 | 24.5 |
| Labour | P. Koppel | 472 | 23.6 |
| Turnout | | ~2,003 | 29.8 |
| Registered electors | | 6,955 | |
| Conservative win (new seat) | | | |
| Conservative win (new seat) | | | |
| Conservative win (new seat) | | | |
| Conservative win (new seat) | | | |

=== Bridge ===
Bridge (4 seats)
| Party | Candidate | Votes | % |
|---|---|---|---|
| Labour | A. Frost | 1,395 | 69.9 |
| Labour | R. Kirby | 1,344 | 67.3 |
| Labour | M. Sharman | 1,323 | 66.2 |
| Labour | P. Ross | 1,315 | 65.8 |
| Conservative | E. Schur | 639 | 32.0 |
| Turnout | | ~1,997 | 24.5 |
| Registered electors | | 8,151 | |
| Labour win (new seat) | | | |
| Labour win (new seat) | | | |
| Labour win (new seat) | | | |
| Labour win (new seat) | | | |

=== Broomhill ===
Broomhill (3 seats)
| Party | Candidate | Votes | % |
|---|---|---|---|
| Conservative | D. Myer | 936 | 68.8 |
| Conservative | E. Clarke | 850 | 62.5 |
| Conservative | A. Rampling | 847 | 62.2 |
| Labour | J. North | 507 | 37.3 |
| Labour | D. Watkins | 478 | 35.1 |
| Labour | J. Watkins | 465 | 34.2 |
| Turnout | | ~1,485 | 30.2 |
| Registered electors | | 4,917 | |
| Conservative win (new seat) | | | |
| Conservative win (new seat) | | | |
| Conservative win (new seat) | | | |

=== Chantry ===
Chantry (5 seats)
| Party | Candidate | Votes | % |
|---|---|---|---|
| Labour | A. Smith | 1,535 | 71.8 |
| Labour | J. Austin | 1,525 | 71.3 |
| Labour | P. Gray | 1,513 | 70.7 |
| Labour | D. Eaton | 1,485 | 69.4 |
| Labour | M Griffiths | 1,456 | 68.1 |
| Conservative | O. Cook | 532 | 24.9 |
| Conservative | G. Dalby | 508 | 23.7 |
| Turnout | | ~2,139 | 20.6 |
| Registered electors | | 10,382 | |
| Labour win (new seat) | | | |
| Labour win (new seat) | | | |
| Labour win (new seat) | | | |
| Labour win (new seat) | | | |
| Labour win (new seat) | | | |

=== Gainsborough ===
Gainsborough (3 seats)
| Party | Candidate | Votes | % |
|---|---|---|---|
| Labour | M. Mickleburgh | 1,015 | 70.3 |
| Labour | S. Godward | 993 | 68.8 |
| Labour | R. Skerritt | 957 | 66.3 |
| Conservative | R. Sharman | 365 | 25.3 |
| Turnout | | ~1,443 | 24.8 |
| Registered electors | | 5,820 | |
| Labour win (new seat) | | | |
| Labour win (new seat) | | | |
| Labour win (new seat) | | | |

=== Middle ===
Middle (2 seats)
| Party | Candidate | Votes | % |
|---|---|---|---|
| Labour | T. Gooding | 657 | 47.8 |
| Labour | D. Wright | 640 | 46.6 |
| Conservative | R. Weller | 523 | 38.1 |
| Conservative | R. Hubbard | 501 | 36.5 |
| Liberal | G. Smith | 216 | 15.7 |
| Liberal | S. Fairbairn | 211 | 15.4 |
| Turnout | | ~1,458 | 38.3 |
| Registered electors | | 3,807 | |
| Labour win (new seat) | | | |
| Labour win (new seat) | | | |

=== Racecourse ===
Racecourse (3 seats)
| Party | Candidate | Votes | % |
|---|---|---|---|
| Labour | B. James | 944 | 74.3 |
| Labour | A. Leverett | 892 | 70.2 |
| Labour | R. Elliott | 879 | 69.2 |
| Conservative | M. Farthing | 289 | 22.7 |
| Turnout | | ~1,271 | 25.2 |
| Registered electors | | 5,023 | |
| Labour win (new seat) | | | |
| Labour win (new seat) | | | |
| Labour win (new seat) | | | |

=== Rushmere ===
Rushmere (3 seats)
| Party | Candidate | Votes | % |
|---|---|---|---|
| Conservative | M. Keeble | 1,316 | 45.5 |
| Labour | J. Wright | 1,309 | 45.3 |
| Labour | C. Rawlinson | 1,305 | 45.2 |
| Conservative | W. Pipe | 1,304 | 45.1 |
| Conservative | N. Myer | 1,281 | 44.3 |
| Labour | F. Phelps | 1,273 | 44.1 |
| Liberal | C. Nugent | 480 | 16.6 |
| Liberal | K. Fairbairn | 400 | 13.8 |
| Turnout | | ~3,048 | 49.1 |
| Registered electors | | 6,207 | |
| Conservative win (new seat) | | | |
| Labour win (new seat) | | | |
| Labour win (new seat) | | | |

=== St Clements ===
St Clements (3 seats)
| Party | Candidate | Votes | % |
|---|---|---|---|
| Labour | E. Grant | 1,107 | 52.1 |
| Labour | N. Chaplin | 1,094 | 51.5 |
| Labour | P. Helleur | 1,070 | 50.4 |
| Conservative | A. Seabrook | 1,053 | 49.6 |
| Conservative | J. Roff | 1,038 | 48.9 |
| Conservative | M. Seabrook | 1,011 | 47.6 |
| Turnout | | 2,200 | 41.7 |
| Registered electors | | 5,276 | |
| Labour win (new seat) | | | |
| Labour win (new seat) | | | |
| Labour win (new seat) | | | |

=== St John's ===
St John's (3 seats)
| Party | Candidate | Votes | % |
|---|---|---|---|
| Labour | D. Graham | 1,378 | 64.1 |
| Labour | D. Warsop | 1,372 | 63.8 |
| Labour | B. O'Reilly | 1,353 | 62.9 |
| Conservative | J. Cooper | 790 | 36.7 |
| Conservative | S. Young | 782 | 36.4 |
| Conservative | D. Farthing | 774 | 36.0 |
| Turnout | | ~2,234 | 43.3 |
| Registered electors | | 5,159 | |
| Labour win (new seat) | | | |
| Labour win (new seat) | | | |
| Labour win (new seat) | | | |

=== St Margaret's ===
St Margaret's (3 seats)
| Party | Candidate | Votes | % |
|---|---|---|---|
| Conservative | H. Davis | 1,498 | 77.0 |
| Conservative | D. Marrlott | 1,466 | 75.3 |
| Conservative | M. Macdonald | 1,450 | 74.5 |
| Labour | M. Ross | 489 | 25.1 |
| Labour | K. Wilson | 479 | 24.6 |
| Labour | R. Thorpe | 458 | 23.5 |
| Turnout | | ~2,122 | 34.3 |
| Registered electors | | 6,188 | |
| Conservative win (new seat) | | | |
| Conservative win (new seat) | | | |
| Conservative win (new seat) | | | |

=== Valley ===
Valley (3 seats)
| Party | Candidate | Votes | % |
|---|---|---|---|
| Labour | J. Cook | 822 | 52.8 |
| Labour | T. Gondris | 808 | 51.9 |
| Labour | J. Cann | 803 | 51.6 |
| Conservative | D. Cooper | 756 | 48.6 |
| Conservative | A. Barker | 751 | 48.2 |
| Conservative | P. Claxton | 730 | 46.9 |
| Turnout | | ~1,648 | 36.4 |
| Registered electors | | 4,528 | |
| Labour win (new seat) | | | |
| Labour win (new seat) | | | |
| Labour win (new seat) | | | |

=== Westbourne ===
Westbourne (3 seats)
| Party | Candidate | Votes | % |
|---|---|---|---|
| Labour | S. Mason | 1,101 | 72.6 |
| Labour | C. Packard | 1,083 | 71.5 |
| Labour | D. North | 1,037 | 68.4 |
| Conservative | D. Rees | 456 | 30.1 |
| Conservative | J. Mudd | 438 | 28.9 |
| Conservative | R. Mudd | 432 | 28.5 |
| Turnout | | ~1,638 | 27.3 |
| Registered electors | | 6,000 | |
| Labour win (new seat) | | | |
| Labour win (new seat) | | | |
| Labour win (new seat) | | | |

=== Whitton ===
Whitton (5 seats)
| Party | Candidate | Votes | % |
|---|---|---|---|
| Labour | A. Lambert | 1,720 | 68.2 |
| Labour | W. Knowles | 1,636 | 64.8 |
| Labour | C. Hyde | 1,619 | 64.2 |
| Labour | G. Miller | 1,605 | 63.6 |
| Labour | D. Rowland | 1,595 | 63.2 |
| Conservative | B. Paternoster | 824 | 32.7 |
| Conservative | D. Thomas | 804 | 31.9 |
| Turnout | | ~2,523 | 26.2 |
| Registered electors | | 9,631 | |
| Labour win (new seat) | | | |
| Labour win (new seat) | | | |
| Labour win (new seat) | | | |
| Labour win (new seat) | | | |
| Labour win (new seat) | | | |
