= 1973 Norfolk County Council election =

1973 UK local government election

- 12 April 1973

All 84 seats to Norfolk County Council 43 seats needed for a majority

	First party	Second party
Party	Conservative	Labour
Seats won	51	27
Popular vote	100,673	90,109
Percentage	48.5%	43.4%
	Third party	Fourth party
Party	Independent	Ind. Conservative
Seats won	4	1
Popular vote	7,023	1,939
Percentage	3.4%	0.9%
Council control after election
Conservative

The 1973 Norfolk County Council election took place on 12 April 1973 to elect members of Norfolk County Council in Norfolk, England. This was on the same day as other local elections.

This was the first election to Norfolk County Council following the structural reforms to local government laid out in the Local Government Act 1972.

== Summary ==
=== Election result ===
1973 Norfolk County Council election
Party	Candidates	Seats	Gains	Losses	Net gain/loss	Seats %	Votes %	Votes	+/−
Conservative	78	51	N/A	N/A	N/A	65.4	48.5	100,673	N/A
Labour	81	27	N/A	N/A	N/A	28.2	43.4	90,109	N/A
Independent	10	4	N/A	N/A	N/A	5.1	3.4	7,023	N/A
Ind. Conservative	1	1	N/A	N/A	N/A	1.3	0.9	1,939	N/A
Liberal	14	0	N/A	N/A	N/A	0.0	3.6	7,453	N/A
Communist	1	0	N/A	N/A	N/A	0.0	0.1	166	N/A
National Front	1	0	N/A	N/A	N/A	0.0	0.1	138	N/A
Ind. Socialist	1	0	N/A	N/A	N/A	0.0	<0.1	84	N/A
