= 1973 Blackpool Borough Council election =

1973 local election in Lancashire, England

- 10 May 1973

All 56 seats to Blackpool Borough Council 28 seats needed for a majority

	First party	Second party	Third party
Party	Conservative	Labour	Independent
Seats won	40	10	3
	Fourth party
Party	Liberal
Seats won	3
Leader after election
Jim Blake
Conservative

The 1973 Blackpool Borough Council election took place on 10 May 1973. It was the first election to the newly formed Blackpool Borough Council following the local government reorganisation of 1972. This was on the same day as other local elections in England.

== Summary ==
The election resulted in a Conservative majority on the new council.

=== Election result ===
1973 Blackpool Borough Council
Party	Candidates	Seats	Gains	Losses	Net gain/loss	Seats %	Votes %	Votes	+/−
Conservative	56	40							
Labour	52	10							
Independent	7	3							
Liberal	6	3							

== Ward Results ==
=== Alexandra ===
Alexandra (3 seats)
Party	Candidate	Votes	%	±%
Conservative	Hoggard M. Ms.	1,229	54.6	
Conservative	Haden A.	1,205		
Conservative	Clegg R.	1,176		
Labour	Dugdale W.	1,021	45.4	
Labour	Edwards P. Ms.	979		
Labour	Roberts K.	939		
Turnout			37.0	
Conservative win (new seat)				
Conservative win (new seat)				
Conservative win (new seat)				

=== Anchorsholme ===
Anchorsholme (4 seats)
Party	Candidate	Votes	%	±%
Conservative	Nuttall C.	2,388	64.8	
Conservative	Jackson H.	2,383		
Conservative	Moss D. Ms.	2,280		
Conservative	Smythe B. Ms.	2,257		
Labour	Amor R.	1,299	35.2	
Labour	Rees J.	1,242		
Labour	Eggleton P. Ms.	1,238		
Labour	Whitehouse A.	1,187		
Turnout			38.3	
Conservative win (new seat)				
Conservative win (new seat)				
Conservative win (new seat)				
Conservative win (new seat)				

=== Bank Hey ===
Bank Hey (3 seats)
Party	Candidate	Votes	%	±%
Labour	Allcock E.	1,095	51.4	
Labour	Cousins L.	1,050		
Labour	Kirton E.	1,042		
Conservative	Crichton R.	1,034	48.6	
Conservative	Whitehouse E.	939		
Conservative	Parkinson J.	929		
Turnout			35.3	
Labour win (new seat)				
Labour win (new seat)				
Labour win (new seat)				

=== Bispham ===
Bispham (4 seats)
Party	Candidate	Votes	%	±%
Conservative	Percival T.	2,436	59.5	
Conservative	Ward H.	2,296		
Conservative	Hoyle H.	2,286		
Conservative	Henry I.	2,225		
Labour	McKellar T.	1,659	40.5	
Labour	Neish D.	1,419		
Labour	White B.	1,376		
Labour	Marsh H.	1,372		
Turnout			41.3	
Conservative win (new seat)				
Conservative win (new seat)				
Conservative win (new seat)				
Conservative win (new seat)				

=== Brunswick ===
Brunswick (3 seats)
Party	Candidate	Votes	%	±%
Conservative	Battersby J.	1,236	68.6	
Conservative	Sainsbury A. Ms.	1,187		
Conservative	Cockerill H.	1,182		
Labour	Dean R.	565	31.4	
Labour	Green D.	534		
Labour	Lloyd T.	528		
Turnout			30.3	
Conservative win (new seat)				
Conservative win (new seat)				
Conservative win (new seat)				

=== Claremont ===
Claremont (3 seats)
Party	Candidate	Votes	%	±%
Liberal	Riddle M. Ms.	1,433	40.7	
Conservative	Smith J.	1,256	35.7	
Liberal	Hessey J.	1,228		
Conservative	Shorrock J.	1,193		
Conservative	Hanson A.	1,175		
Liberal	Pogson A.	1,075		
Labour	Lewis A. Ms.	834	23.7	
Turnout			45.0	
Liberal win (new seat)				
Conservative win (new seat)				
Liberal win (new seat)				

=== Clifton ===
Clifton (4 seats)
Party	Candidate	Votes	%	±%
Labour	Lander A.	1,556	51.5	
Labour	Bond R.	1,519		
Labour	Moore D.	1,457		
Labour	Lewis H.	1,425		
Conservative	Lovatt F. Ms.	1,303	43.1	
Conservative	England L.	1,223		
Conservative	Ryan C.	1,140		
Conservative	Baldwin G.	1,127		
Communist	Cross J.	163	5.4	
Communist	Nuttall S.	131		
Turnout			32.7	
Labour win (new seat)				
Labour win (new seat)				
Labour win (new seat)				
Labour win (new seat)				

=== Foxhall ===
Foxhall (3 seats)
Party	Candidate	Votes	%	±%
Conservative	Dewhirst R.	953	36.0	
Liberal	Barnes M. Ms.	920	34.8	
Conservative	Holgate R.	761		
Conservative	Cunliffe J. Ms.	661		
Labour	Porter F.	439	16.6	
Labour	Stockwell F.	368		
Labour	Lobley C.	362		
Independent	McDermott J.	332	12.6	
Turnout			35.0	
Conservative win (new seat)				
Liberal win (new seat)				
Conservative win (new seat)				

=== Layton ===
Layton (4 seats)
Party	Candidate	Votes	%	±%
Conservative	Jacobs R.	1,501	39.2	
Conservative	Broughton C.	1,399		
Conservative	Robinson W.	1,363		
Labour	Courtney D.	1,319	34.4	
Conservative	Bailey J.	1,199		
Labour	Ross G.	1,183		
Labour	Smith M. Ms.	1,166		
Labour	Turton J.	1,043		
Liberal	Butcher F.	1,010	26.4	
Liberal	Edwards E.	775		
Turnout			41.1	
Conservative win (new seat)				
Conservative win (new seat)				
Conservative win (new seat)				
Labour win (new seat)				

=== Marton ===
Marton (3 seats)
Party	Candidate	Votes	%	±%
Conservative	Lowe C.	1,244	66.1	
Conservative	Greenwood L.	1,207		
Conservative	Green S.	1,178		
Labour	Hargreaves V. Ms.	638	33.9	
Labour	Elgee D.	607		
Labour	Owen A.	606		
Turnout			34.9	
Conservative win (new seat)				
Conservative win (new seat)				
Conservative win (new seat)				

=== Squires Gate ===
Squires Gate (3 seats)
Party	Candidate	Votes	%	±%
Independent	Wynne E.	1,751	48.0	
Independent	Wiseman J.	1,646		
Conservative	Mackinnon C.	1,516	41.5	
Conservative	Simpson W.	1,197		
Independent	Cutbush R.	1,121		
Conservative	Henderson L. Ms.	1,037		
Labour	Grime K.	383	10.5	
Labour	Jackson P. Ms.	323		
Turnout			51.3	
Independent win (new seat)				
Independent win (new seat)				
Conservative win (new seat)				

=== Stanley ===
Stanley (3 seats)
Party	Candidate	Votes	%	±%
Independent	Wynne N. Ms.	1,352	40.2	
Conservative	Ashworth A.	1,124	33.4	
Conservative	Baguley G.	1,081		
Independent	Shaw R.	1,044		
Conservative	Rhodes A.	942		
Independent	Smith B.	900		
Labour	Hall P.	887	26.4	
Labour	Jackson F.	882		
Labour	Mason M. Ms.	837		
Turnout			43.6	
Independent win (new seat)				
Conservative win (new seat)				
Conservative win (new seat)				

=== Talbot ===
Talbot (3 seats)
Party	Candidate	Votes	%	±%
Labour	Taylor I.	1,046	51.3	
Labour	Pomfret L.	1,033		
Conservative	Mitchell H.	993	48.7	
Labour	Lumley P.	817		
Conservative	Hanson S. Ms.	773		
Conservative	Duffy R.	769		
Turnout			39.1	
Labour win (new seat)				
Labour win (new seat)				
Conservative win (new seat)				

=== Tyldesley ===
Tyldesley (3 seats)
Party	Candidate	Votes	%	±%
Conservative	Blake J.	1,274	63.1	
Conservative	Hunt J. Ms.	1,252		
Conservative	Newman S.	1,223		
Labour	Lancaster P.	745	36.9	
Labour	Clarkson A.	692		
Labour	Hodgson G.	652		
Turnout			33.2	
Conservative win (new seat)				
Conservative win (new seat)				
Conservative win (new seat)				

=== Victoria ===
Victoria (3 seats)
Party	Candidate	Votes	%	±%
Conservative	Cox J.	1,101	55.3	
Conservative	Lord M.	1,047		
Conservative	Samuels M. Ms.	1,039		
Labour	Law C.	889	44.7	
Labour	Machin E.	802		
Labour	McCrae J.	761		
Turnout			32.3	
Conservative win (new seat)				
Conservative win (new seat)				
Conservative win (new seat)				

=== Warbreck ===
Warbreck (4 seats)
Party	Candidate	Votes	%	±%
Conservative	Broughton L.	1,802	67.7	
Conservative	Aldred J.	1,648		
Conservative	Holmes M. Ms.	1,640		
Conservative	Hudson A.	1,639		
Labour	Mills R.	861	32.3	
Labour	Garmston W.	748		
Labour	Wright S.	715		
Labour	Nye M. Ms.	713		
Turnout			33.5	
Conservative win (new seat)				
Conservative win (new seat)				
Conservative win (new seat)				
Conservative win (new seat)				

=== Waterloo ===
Waterloo (3 seats)
Party	Candidate	Votes	%	±%
Conservative	Jackson R.	1,551	77.1	
Conservative	Parkinson S.	1,434		
Conservative	Hanson D.	1,384		
Labour	Law M. Ms.	460	22.9	
Labour	McTaggart J.	384		
Turnout			33.3	
Conservative win (new seat)				
Conservative win (new seat)				
Conservative win (new seat)				
