= 1973 Babergh District Council election =

1973 English local government election

- 10 May 1973

All 38 seats to Babergh District Council 20 seats needed for a majority

	First party	Second party	Third party
Party	Independent	Labour	Conservative
Seats won	19	11	8
Popular vote	10,893	11,229	8,308
Percentage	35.8%	36.9%	27.3%
Control after election
No overall control

The 1973 Babergh District Council election took place on 10 May 1973 to elect members of Babergh District Council in Suffolk, England. This was on the same day as other local elections.

This was the inaugural election to the council following its creation by the Local Government Act 1972.

== Summary ==
=== Election result ===
1973 Babergh District Council election
Party	Candidates	Seats	Gains	Losses	Net gain/loss	Seats %	Votes %	Votes	+/−
Independent	37	19	N/A	N/A	N/A	50.0	35.8	10,893	N/A
Labour	22	11	N/A	N/A	N/A	28.9	36.9	11,229	N/A
Conservative	15	8	N/A	N/A	N/A	21.1	27.3	8,308	N/A

== Ward results ==
Incumbent councillors standing for re-election are marked with an asterisk (*). Changes in seats do not take into account by-elections or defections.

=== Alton ===
Alton
Party	Candidate	Votes	%
Labour	R. Cook	226	53.8
Independent	M. Cooper	194	46.2
Majority		32	7.6
Turnout		420	37.8
Registered electors		1,112	
Labour win (new seat)			

=== Berners ===
Berners
Party	Candidate	Votes	%
Independent	E. Pollard	372	78.5
Labour	M. Fox Ms.	102	21.5
Majority		270	57.0
Turnout		474	36.6
Registered electors		1,294	
Independent win (new seat)			

=== Bildeston ===
Bildeston
Party	Candidate	Votes	%
Independent	O. Simpson	245	60.6
Independent	E. Turney	159	39.4
Majority		86	21.2
Turnout		404	34.2
Registered electors		1,182	
Independent win (new seat)			

=== Boxford ===
Boxford
Party	Candidate	Votes	%
Independent	T. Clarke	400	66.9
Conservative	T. Stedman	198	33.1
Majority		202	33.8
Turnout		598	43.7
Registered electors		1,367	
Independent win (new seat)			

=== Brantham ===
Brantham
Party	Candidate	Votes	%
Independent	H. Manning	Unopposed	
Registered electors		1,272	
Independent win (new seat)			

=== Brett Vale ===
Brett Vale
Party	Candidate	Votes	%
Independent	D. Arthey	Unopposed	
Registered electors		1,195	
Independent win (new seat)			

=== Brookvale ===
Brookvale
Party	Candidate	Votes	%
Independent	J. Baxter	222	58.6
Independent	J. Gray	157	41.4
Majority		65	17.2
Turnout		379	26.5
Registered electors		1,430	
Independent win (new seat)			

=== Bures St. Mary ===
Bures St. Mary
Party	Candidate	Votes	%
Conservative	H. Engleheart	298	66.1
Independent	G. Ardley	153	33.9
Majority		145	32.2
Turnout		451	42.5
Registered electors		1,062	
Conservative win (new seat)			

=== Capel & Wenham ===
Capel & Wenham
Party	Candidate	Votes	%
Labour	R. Pearce	369	56.2
Conservative	H. Hawkins	288	43.8
Majority		81	12.3
Turnout		657	45.5
Registered electors		1,443	
Labour win (new seat)			

=== Chadacre ===
Chadacre
Party	Candidate	Votes	%
Independent	G. Ince	299	61.9
Independent	G. Hatchett	183	37.9
Majority		116	24.0
Turnout		483	34.3
Registered electors		1,407	
Independent win (new seat)			

=== Copdock ===
Copdock
Party	Candidate	Votes	%
Independent	R. Moore	Unopposed	
Registered electors		1,194	
Independent win (new seat)			

=== Dodnash ===
Dodnash (2 seats)
Party	Candidate	Votes	%
Independent	T. Goodchild	594	60.2
Independent	C. Wake-Walker	582	59.0
Labour	N. Grimsey	393	39.9
Turnout		~986	37.1
Registered electors		2,658	
Independent win (new seat)			
Independent win (new seat)			

=== Elmsett ===
Elmsett
Party	Candidate	Votes	%
Independent	W. Crockatt	265	38.9
Independent	L. Sharpe	239	35.1
Independent	N. Lewis	177	26.0
Majority		26	3.8
Turnout		681	60.4
Registered electors		1,127	
Independent win (new seat)			

=== Glemsford ===
Glemsford
Party	Candidate	Votes	%
Labour	F. Shinn	460	59.9
Independent	J. Piper	308	40.1
Majority		152	19.8
Turnout		768	52.0
Registered electors		1,477	
Labour win (new seat)			

=== Great Cornard North ===
Great Cornard North (2 seats)
Party	Candidate	Votes	%
Labour	W. Aldworth	396	71.0
Labour	S. Langton	384	68.9
Conservative	B. Lewery	162	29.0
Turnout		~558	26.6
Registered electors		2,098	
Labour win (new seat)			
Labour win (new seat)			

=== Great Cornard South ===
Great Cornard South (2 seats)
Party	Candidate	Votes	%
Labour	R. Chaplin	439	50.2
Conservative	A. Eady	437	49.9
Labour	M. Caschere	398	45.5
Conservative	G. Baldwin	379	43.3
Turnout		~875	36.9
Registered electors		2,371	
Labour win (new seat)			
Conservative win (new seat)			

=== Hadleigh ===
Hadleigh (3 seats)
Party	Candidate	Votes	%
Labour	S. Brown	871	60.0
Labour	B. Shuttlewood	759	52.3
Labour	J. Whitehead	581	40.0
Independent	J. Osborne	578	39.8
Independent	M. Crabtree	521	35.9
Independent	J. Catterall	443	30.5
Turnout		~1,451	38.1
Registered electors		3,808	
Labour win (new seat)			
Labour win (new seat)			
Labour win (new seat)			

=== Holbrook ===
Holbrook
Party	Candidate	Votes	%
Independent	J. Godley	458	79.1
Labour	R. Levick	121	20.9
Majority		337	58.2
Turnout		579	47.8
Registered electors		1,211	
Independent win (new seat)			

=== Lavenham ===
Lavenham
Party	Candidate	Votes	%
Independent	L. Spraggins	338	56.1
Independent	A. Neynell	264	43.9
Majority		74	12.3
Turnout		602	50.3
Registered electors		1,197	
Independent win (new seat)			

=== Leavenheath ===
Leavenheath
Party	Candidate	Votes	%
Conservative	E. York	Unopposed	
Registered electors		1,234	
Conservative win (new seat)			

=== Long Melford ===
Long Melford (2 seats)
Party	Candidate	Votes	%
Independent	C. Kingston	539	48.1
Independent	R. Kemp	529	47.2
Labour	R. Oakman	290	25.9
Conservative	P. Stone	290	25.9
Independent	C. Edmunds	147	13.1
Turnout		~1,120	45.8
Registered electors		2,445	
Independent win (new seat)			
Independent win (new seat)			

=== Nayland ===
Nayland
Party	Candidate	Votes	%
Independent	P. Hetherington	238	50.3
Independent	J. Mitchell	235	49.7
Majority		3	0.6
Turnout		473	51.0
Registered electors		928	
Independent win (new seat)			

=== No. 1 (Sudbury) ===
No. 1 (Sudbury) (5 seats)
Party	Candidate	Votes	%
Conservative	W. Barker	1,443	41.2
Conservative	R. Playford	1,282	36.6
Labour	H. Banham	1,130	32.2
Labour	P. Moulton	1,048	29.9
Conservative	E. Hoare	1,045	29.8
Conservative	G. Parker	1,008	28.8
Labour	S. Gargiulo	995	28.4
Labour	A. Fenwick	961	27.4
Labour	H. Taylor	958	27.3
Independent	R. Burn	930	26.5
Conservative	H. Singh	781	22.3
Turnout		~3,506	53.7
Registered electors		6,528	
Conservative win (new seat)			
Conservative win (new seat)			
Labour win (new seat)			
Labour win (new seat)			
Conservative win (new seat)			

=== North Cosford ===
North Cosford
Party	Candidate	Votes	%
Independent	D. Hodge	Unopposed	
Registered electors		1,105	
Independent win (new seat)			

=== Polstead & Layham ===
Polstead & Layham
Party	Candidate	Votes	%
Conservative	F. Gales	361	77.3
Labour	R. Cook	106	22.7
Majority		255	54.6
Turnout		467	50.2
Registered electors		931	
Conservative win (new seat)			

=== Shotley ===
Shotley
Party	Candidate	Votes	%
Independent	T. Lloyd	180	35.2
Independent	J. Green	177	34.6
Labour	E. Norton	85	16.6
Independent	J. Watson	70	13.7
Majority		3	0.6
Turnout		512	40.7
Registered electors		1,259	
Independent win (new seat)			

=== Waldingfield ===
Waldingfield
Party	Candidate	Votes	%
Independent	R. Herbert	424	73.0
Labour	D. King	157	27.0
Majority		267	46.0
Turnout		581	35.1
Registered electors		1,655	
Independent win (new seat)			

=== West Samford ===
West Samford
Party	Candidate	Votes	%
Conservative	D. Wedgwood	336	55.2
Independent	R. Dunningham	273	44.8
Majority		63	10.4
Turnout		609	58.1
Registered electors		1,048	
Conservative win (new seat)			
