= 1973 Lancaster City Council election =

Election

- 10 May 1973

All 59 seats to Lancaster City Council 30 seats needed for a majority

	First party	Second party	Third party
Party	Conservative	Labour	Independent
Seats won	34	18	4
Popular vote	37,811	32,258	7,865
	Fourth party	Fifth party
Party	Residents	Liberal
Seats won	2	1
Popular vote	4,517	303
Leader after election
Conservative

Composition of Lancaster City Council after the 1973 election

The 1973 Lancaster City Council election took place on 10 May 1973. It was the first election to the newly formed Lancaster City Council following the local government reorganisation of 1972. This was on the same day as other local elections in England.

== Summary ==
The election resulted in a Conservative majority on the new council.

=== Election result ===
1973 Lancaster City Council
Party	Candidates	Seats	Gains	Losses	Net gain/loss	Seats %	Votes %	Votes	+/−
Conservative	59	34						37,811	
Labour	44	18						32,258	
Independent	18	4						7,865	
Residents	4	2						4,517	
Liberal	1	1						302	

== Ward Results ==
=== Arkholme ===
Arkholme (1 seat)
Party	Candidate	Votes	%	±%
Conservative	Macintyre G.	461		
Independent	Priestley L.	247		
Turnout		708		
Conservative win (new seat)				

=== Bolton-Le-Sands ===
Bolton-Le-Sands (2 seats)
Party	Candidate	Votes	%	±%
Conservative	Arthur Briggs	975		
Conservative	Rigg W.	899		
Independent	Brown H.	297		
Independent	Skelly R.	236		
Labour	Swarbrick M.	168		
Labour	Phillips G.	136		
Turnout		2,711		
Conservative win (new seat)				
Conservative win (new seat)				

=== Carnforth ===
Carnforth (2 seats)
Party	Candidate	Votes	%	±%
Labour	Edna Jones	753		
Labour	Clarke J.	737		
Conservative	Owen G.	676		
Conservative	Kennan I.	642		
Turnout		2,808		
Labour win (new seat)				
Labour win (new seat)				

=== Halton-With-Aughton ===
Halton-With-Aughton (1 seat)
Party	Candidate	Votes	%	±%
Independent	Lindley A.	657		
Conservative	Bowring M. Ms.	419		
Turnout		1,076		
Independent win (new seat)				

=== Heysham North ===
Heysham North (2 seats)
Party	Candidate	Votes	%	±%
Conservative	Kennan M.	852		
Conservative	Bryan G.	833		
Labour	Ashcroft R.	538		
Labour	Ravensdale T. Ms.	523		
Turnout				
Conservative win (new seat)				
Conservative win (new seat)				

=== Hornby ===
Hornby (1 seat)
Party	Candidate	Votes	%	±%
Conservative	Holt J.	791		
Labour	Evans E.	108		
Turnout		899		
Conservative win (new seat)				

=== Harbour ===
Harbour (2 seats)
Party	Candidate	Votes	%	±%
Labour	Garbutt E.	840		
Labour	Wolfenden G.	724		
Conservative	Higginson T.	742		
Labour	Yewdall K.	714		
Turnout		3020		
Labour win (new seat)				
Labour win (new seat)				

=== Poulton ===
Poulton (2 seats)
Party	Candidate	Votes	%	±%
Labour	Goodwin J.	781		
Labour	Banks P. Ms.	561		
Conservative	Heeler G.	684		
Independent	Airey R.	548		
Turnout		2,011		
Labour win (new seat)				
Labour win (new seat)				

=== Parks ===
Parks (2 seats)
Party	Candidate	Votes	%	±%
Conservative	Welldrake I. Ms.	Unopposed		
Conservative	Dawson J.	Unopposed		
Turnout		0		
Conservative win (new seat)				
Conservative win (new seat)				

=== Heysham Central ===
Heysham Central (3 seats)
Party	Candidate	Votes	%	±%
Conservative	John Elliot	1,200		
Conservative	Fearn R. Ms.	1,035		
Conservative	Hesketh A.	845		
Residents	Dry D.	964		
Residents	Johnson E. Ms.	779		
Turnout		2,162		
Conservative win (new seat)				
Conservative win (new seat)				
Conservative win (new seat)				

=== Heysham South ===
Heysham South (3 seats)
Party	Candidate	Votes	%	±%
Residents	Bolton N. Ms.	1,649		
Residents	Earnshaw W.	1,125		
Conservative	Downey J.	900		
Independent	Warren K.	828		
Labour	Spencer O.	516		
Conservative	Walkden G.	466		
Conservative	Maly J.	313		
Turnout		3,890		
Residents win (new seat)				
Residents win (new seat)				

=== Cockerham ===
Cockerham (1 seat)
Party	Candidate	Votes	%	±%
Conservative	Bibby R.	218		
Independent	Jackson T.	217		
Turnout		435		
Conservative win (new seat)				

=== Ellel ===
Ellel (2 seats)
Party	Candidate	Votes	%	±%
Independent	Carr R.	668		
Conservative	Lowthon J.	604		
Conservative	Entwistle P.	392		
Labour	Mawdsley E.	251		
Labour	Skerratt L.	196		
Turnout		1,521		
Independent win (new seat)				
Conservative win (new seat)				

=== Warton ===
Warton (1 seat)
Party	Candidate	Votes	%	±%
Liberal	Peacock C.	303		
Conservative	Shuttleworth H. Ms.	270		
Independent	Burrows T.	161		
Labour	Woof P. Ms.	119		
Independent	Rudkin E. Ms.	98		
Turnout		951		
Liberal win (new seat)				

=== Caton ===
Caton (2 seats)
Party	Candidate	Votes	%	±%
Conservative	Potts M. Ms.	670		
Conservative	Walling G.	630		
Independent	Huddleston J.	512		
Labour	Adams C.	390		
Labour	Daniels R.	383		
Independent	Ball F.	224		
Turnout		1,574		
Conservative win (new seat)				
Conservative win (new seat)				

=== Kellet ===
Kellet (1 seat)
Party	Candidate	Votes	%	±%
Conservative	Snowball G.	303		
Independent	Pickles W.	221		
Labour	Stafford E.	61		
Turnout		585		
Conservative win (new seat)				

=== Bulk & St. Annes ===
Bulk & St. Annes (4 seats)
Party	Candidate	Votes	%	±%
Labour	Denwood C.	1,490		
Labour	Bryning A.	1,478		
Labour	Constable B.	1,456		
Labour	Lewthwaite M.	1,407		
Conservative	Rainford M. Ms.	746		
Conservative	Osliffe H.	743		
Conservative	Nelson B.	697		
Conservative	Purcell I. Ms.	693		
Turnout		2,237		
Labour win (new seat)				
Labour win (new seat)				
Labour win (new seat)				
Labour win (new seat)				

=== Park ===
Park (2 seats)
Party	Candidate	Votes	%	±%
Labour	Brown J.	733		
Labour	Brown I. Ms.	711		
Conservative	Dodd J.	417		
Independent	Shingler T.	342		
Conservative	Thompson W. Ms.	326		
Turnout		1,493		
Labour win (new seat)				
Labour win (new seat)				

=== John O'Gaunt ===
John O'Gaunt (3 seats)
Party	Candidate	Votes	%	±%
Conservative	Hayton T.	1,140		
Conservative	Lovett-Horn M. Ms.	1,095		
Conservative	Holgate H.	1,046		
Labour	Clowes A.	939		
Labour	Birkett J.	911		
Labour	Perrins M.	883		
Turnout		2,080		
Conservative win (new seat)				
Conservative win (new seat)				
Conservative win (new seat)				

=== Scotforth ===
Scotforth (4 seats)
Party	Candidate	Votes	%	±%
Conservative	Fraser J.	1,722		
Conservative	Ball J.	1,698		
Conservative	Simpson E.	1,657		
Conservative	Nelson K.	1,620		
Labour	Denver B. Ms.	1,375		
Labour	Hands H.	1,366		
Labour	Hosfield H.	1,340		
Labour	Freeman B.	1,339		
Turnout		3,098		
Conservative win (new seat)				
Conservative win (new seat)				
Conservative win (new seat)				
Conservative win (new seat)				

=== Castle ===
Castle (2 seats)
Party	Candidate	Votes	%	±%
Conservative	Sweeney W. Ms.	876		
Conservative	Whittle K. Ms.	753		
Labour	Callan L.	800		
Labour	Wall J.	743		
Turnout		1,675		
Conservative win (new seat)				
Conservative win (new seat)				

=== Alexandra ===
Alexandra (2 seats)
Party	Candidate	Votes	%	±%
Conservative	Hargreaves H.	767		
Conservative	Kershaw D.	754		
Labour	Schofield R.	486		
Labour	Hindle G.	475		
Turnout		1,253		
Conservative win (new seat)				
Conservative win (new seat)				

=== Overton ===
Overton (1 seat)
Party	Candidate	Votes	%	±%
Independent	Mashiter W.	529		
Conservative	Morris A.	199		
Labour	Hammond M.	93		
Turnout				
Independent win (new seat)				

=== Silverdale ===
Silverdale (1 seat)
Party	Candidate	Votes	%	±%
Conservative	Whittaker A.	502		
Independent	Lockwood C.	359		
Turnout				
Conservative win (new seat)				

=== Skerton Central ===
Skerton Central (2 seats)
Party	Candidate	Votes	%	±%
Labour	Henderson D. Ms.	1,200		
Labour	Horner J. Ms.	1,053		
Conservative	Glover M. Ms.	351		
Conservative	Dorrington D.	286		
Independent	Gardner E.	211		
Turnout		1,762		
Labour win (new seat)				
Labour win (new seat)				

=== Skerton East ===
Skerton East (2 seats)
Party	Candidate	Votes	%	±%
Labour	Jones R.	731		
Labour	Lodge J.	663		
Conservative	Hurst A. Ms.	264		
Conservative	Stokes E.	236		
Turnout		995		
Labour win (new seat)				
Labour win (new seat)				

=== Skerton West ===
Skerton West (2 seats)
Party	Candidate	Votes	%	±%
Conservative	Smith S.	886		
Conservative	Taylor J. Ms.	859		
Labour	Yates J. Ms.	437		
Labour	Derrick P.	395		
Turnout		1,323		
Conservative win (new seat)				
Conservative win (new seat)				

=== Slyne-With-Hest ===
Slyne-With-Hest (2 seats)
Party	Candidate	Votes	%	±%
Conservative	Schofield R.	Unopposed		
Conservative	Wilcox F.	Unopposed		
Turnout		0		
Conservative win (new seat)				
Conservative win (new seat)				

=== Torrisholme ===
Torrisholme (2 seats)
Party	Candidate	Votes	%	±%
Conservative	Sumner P.	Unopposed		
Conservative	Rollins R.	Unopposed		
Turnout		0		
Conservative win (new seat)				
Conservative win (new seat)				

=== Victoria ===
Victoria (3 seats)
Party	Candidate	Votes	%	±%
Independent	Langridge T.	1,510		
Labour	Hooper P.	941		
Labour	Taylor S.	928		
Conservative	Lunn P.	893		
Conservative	Bruce K.	861		
Turnout		3,341		
Independent win (new seat)				
Labour win (new seat)				
Labour win (new seat)				
