= 1973 Tendring District Council election =

1973 UK local government election

- 7 June 1973

All 60 seats to Tendring District Council 31 seats needed for a majority

	First party	Second party	Third party
Party	Conservative	Labour	Independent
Seats won	31	11	11
Popular vote	34,412	27,935	6,085
Percentage	43.9%	35.7%	7.8%
	Fourth party	Fifth party
Party	Liberal	Residents
Seats won	4	3
Popular vote	4,306	5,017
Percentage	5.5%	6.4%
Council control after election
Conservative

The 1973 Tendring District Council election were the first elections to the newly created Tendring District Council. They took place on 7 June 1973. This was on the same day as other local elections. The Local Government Act 1972 stipulated that the elected members were to shadow and eventually take over from the predecessor corporation on 1 April 1974.

== Summary ==
=== Election result ===
1973 Tendring District Council election
Party	Seats	Gains	Losses	Net gain/loss	Seats %	Votes %	Votes	+/−
Conservative	31	N/A	N/A	N/A	51.7	43.9	34,412	N/A
Labour	11	N/A	N/A	N/A	18.3	35.7	27,935	N/A
Independent	11	N/A	N/A	N/A	18.3	7.8	6,085	N/A
Liberal	4	N/A	N/A	N/A	6.7	5.5	4,306	N/A
Residents	3	N/A	N/A	N/A	5.0	6.4	5,017	N/A
Independent Liberal	0	N/A	N/A	N/A	0.0	0.7	547	N/A
