= 1973 Luton Borough Council election =

Local election in England

- 10 May 1973

All 48 seats to Luton Borough Council 25 seats needed for a majority

	First party	Second party	Third party
Party	Labour	Conservative	Liberal
Seats won	30	12	6
Popular vote	58,388	44,555	24,631
Percentage	45.6%	34.9%	19.3%
Council control after election
Labour

The 1973 Luton Borough Council election took place on 10 May 1973 to elect members of Luton Borough Council in Bedfordshire, England. This was on the same day as other local elections.

This was the inaugural election to the council following its formation under the Local Government Act 1972.

== Summary ==
=== Election result ===
1973 Luton Borough Council election
Party	Candidates	Seats	Gains	Losses	Net gain/loss	Seats %	Votes %	Votes	+/−
Labour	48	30	N/A	N/A	N/A	62.5	45.6	58,338	N/A
Conservative	48	12	N/A	N/A	N/A	25.0	34.9	44,555	N/A
Liberal	29	6	N/A	N/A	N/A	12.5	19.3	24,631	N/A
Communist	2	0	N/A	N/A	N/A	0.0	0.2	313	N/A

== Ward results ==
=== Central ===
Central (4 seats)
Party	Candidate	Votes	%
Labour	D. Flood	1,002	56.4
Labour	P. Hopkins	893	50.3
Labour	S. Gonshor	886	49.9
Labour	M. Guha	813	45.8
Conservative	G. Dillingham	733	41.3
Conservative	R. Dean	715	40.3
Conservative	A. Madden	700	39.4
Conservative	A. Richardson	695	39.1
Turnout		~1,776	22.8
Registered electors		7,791	
Labour win (new seat)			
Labour win (new seat)			
Labour win (new seat)			
Labour win (new seat)			

=== Crawley ===
Crawley (4 seats)
Party	Candidate	Votes	%
Labour	J. Fox	1,030	40.7
Labour	E. Dimmock	1,015	40.1
Liberal	T. Keens	1,007	39.8
Labour	J. Carleton	1,004	39.7
Liberal	M. McNally	986	39.0
Labour	C. Jephson	972	38.4
Liberal	P. Cadger	967	38.2
Liberal	L. Whiteley	915	36.2
Conservative	J. Seedell	499	19.7
Conservative	R. Walsh	459	18.2
Conservative	A. Lucas	456	18.0
Conservative	N. Wyld	418	16.5
Turnout		~2,529	26.4
Registered electors		9,579	
Labour win (new seat)			
Labour win (new seat)			
Liberal win (new seat)			
Labour win (new seat)			

=== Dallow ===
Dallow (4 seats)
Party	Candidate	Votes	%
Labour	D. Fuller	1,333	60.6
Labour	W. Roberts	1,305	59.3
Labour	E. Scanian	1,305	59.3
Labour	J. Wilson	1,278	58.1
Conservative	I. Findlay	617	28.0
Conservative	G. Gladman	608	27.6
Conservative	G. Farr	608	27.6
Conservative	R. Oakley	601	27.3
Liberal	J. Potten	278	12.6
Turnout		~2,200	24.9
Registered electors		8,836	
Labour win (new seat)			
Labour win (new seat)			
Labour win (new seat)			
Labour win (new seat)			

=== High Town ===
High Town (4 seats)
Party	Candidate	Votes	%
Conservative	F. Lester	1,776	64.8
Conservative	V. Dunington	1,719	62.8
Conservative	A. Flint	1,702	62.1
Conservative	A. Hutt	1,695	61.9
Labour	J. Prosser	918	33.5
Labour	R. Webb	907	33.1
Labour	H. Magill	890	32.5
Labour	R. Turrell	873	31.9
Turnout		~2,739	32.8
Registered electors		8,350	
Conservative win (new seat)			
Conservative win (new seat)			
Conservative win (new seat)			
Conservative win (new seat)			

=== Icknield ===
Icknield (4 seats)
Party	Candidate	Votes	%
Conservative	M. Dodd	1,543	56.3
Conservative	D. Johnston	1,497	54.7
Conservative	R. Cartwright	1,496	54.6
Conservative	J. Lucas	1,455	53.1
Labour	J. Loder	897	32.8
Labour	A. McElhatton	879	32.1
Labour	W. Nixon	879	32.1
Labour	H. Rodell	873	31.9
Liberal	B. Currie	308	11.2
Liberal	C. Cocks	286	10.4
Liberal	D. Philpotts	252	9.2
Liberal	R. Madgett	227	8.3
Turnout		~2,716	29.6
Registered electors		9,176	
Conservative win (new seat)			
Conservative win (new seat)			
Conservative win (new seat)			
Conservative win (new seat)			

=== Leagrave ===
Leagrave (4 seats)
Party	Candidate	Votes	%
Labour	P. Moore	1,448	53.3
Labour	H. Lawrence	1,402	51.6
Labour	K. Hopkins	1,389	51.1
Labour	R. Sills	1,312	48.3
Liberal	M. Dolling	1,244	45.8
Liberal	E. Cooke	1,057	38.9
Liberal	M. Robinson	1,001	36.9
Liberal	A. Shadbolt	953	35.1
Conservative	A. Harris	875	32.2
Conservative	D. Curd	843	31.0
Conservative	M. Whitton	752	27.7
Conservative	R. Samuels	717	26.4
Turnout		~3,364	33.7
Registered electors		9,983	
Labour win (new seat)			
Labour win (new seat)			
Labour win (new seat)			
Labour win (new seat)			

=== Lewsey ===
Lewsey (4 seats)
Party	Candidate	Votes	%
Labour	D. Kennedy	1,574	63.4
Labour	D. Frost	1,520	61.2
Labour	A. Lines	1,517	61.1
Labour	C. Lidyard	1,499	60.3
Conservative	A. Hyett	617	24.8
Conservative	M. Hyett	615	24.8
Conservative	V. Lacey	609	24.5
Conservative	K. White	572	23.0
Liberal	A. Hurst	278	11.2
Liberal	P. Larkman	255	10.3
Liberal	D. Philpotts	211	8.5
Liberal	P. Vass	204	8.2
Communist	C. Pinder	77	3.1
Turnout		~2,484	25.1
Registered electors		9,896	
Labour win (new seat)			
Labour win (new seat)			
Labour win (new seat)			
Labour win (new seat)			

=== Limbury ===
Limbury (4 seats)
Party	Candidate	Votes	%
Labour	C. Holes	1,420	51.6
Labour	R. Jeffries	1,386	50.3
Labour	L. Keary	1,353	49.1
Labour	C. Lewis	1,340	48.7
Conservative	G. Payne	821	29.8
Conservative	J. Poulter	760	27.6
Conservative	P. Wolsey	755	27.4
Conservative	M. Boutwood	723	26.3
Liberal	D. Cross	528	19.2
Liberal	E. Cross	493	17.9
Liberal	R. Webster	476	17.3
Liberal	T. Reeve	445	16.2
Turnout		~2,753	30.1
Registered electors		9,146	
Labour win (new seat)			
Labour win (new seat)			
Labour win (new seat)			
Labour win (new seat)			

=== South ===
South (4 seats)
Party	Candidate	Votes	%
Labour	T. Kenneally	1,578	56.3
Labour	R. Fitzpatrick	1,466	52.3
Labour	T. Jenkins	1,400	50.0
Labour	S. Swords	1,386	49.5
Conservative	E. O'Donnell	1,113	39.7
Conservative	K. Cooper	1,032	36.8
Conservative	C. Everard	998	35.6
Conservative	D. Gee	966	34.5
Communist	G. Slessor	236	8.4
Turnout		~2,801	27.5
Registered electors		10,190	
Labour win (new seat)			
Labour win (new seat)			
Labour win (new seat)			
Labour win (new seat)			

=== Stopsley ===
Stopsley (4 seats)
Party	Candidate	Votes	%
Liberal	E. Fisher	1,649	44.4
Liberal	F. Shillingford	1,437	38.7
Liberal	H. Roe	1,331	35.8
Liberal	J. Wogan	1,319	35.5
Labour	M. Payne	1,314	35.4
Labour	A. Baldry	1,229	33.1
Labour	M. Power	1,195	32.2
Labour	H. Ruis	1,189	32.0
Conservative	K. Taylor	962	25.9
Conservative	L. Chantler	919	24.7
Conservative	D. Jackson	885	23.8
Conservative	A. Wright	831	22.4
Turnout		~3,715	40.3
Registered electors		9,218	
Liberal win (new seat)			
Liberal win (new seat)			
Liberal win (new seat)			
Liberal win (new seat)			

=== Sundon Park ===
Sundon Park (4 seats)
Party	Candidate	Votes	%
Labour	J. Cussen	1,939	44.1
Labour	E. Haldane	1,842	41.9
Labour	F. Carter	1,745	39.7
Liberal	J. James	1,681	38.2
Liberal	C. Edmond	1,631	37.1
Labour	L. Thakoordin	1,621	36.9
Liberal	P. Madgett	1,621	36.9
Liberal	N. Murray	1,591	36.2
Conservative	P. Glenister	874	19.9
Conservative	V. Gibbs	746	17.0
Conservative	J. Goldsmith	725	16.5
Conservative	C. Roper	696	15.8
Turnout		~4,395	41.4
Registered electors		10,617	
Labour win (new seat)			
Labour win (new seat)			
Labour win (new seat)			
Liberal win (new seat)			

=== Wardown ===
Wardown (4 seats)
Party	Candidate	Votes	%
Conservative	W. Copeland	1,351	59.4
Conservative	K. Connolly	1,317	57.9
Conservative	G. Hickinbottom	1,312	57.7
Conservative	K. Woodbridge	1,177	51.7
Labour	D. Coppins	950	41.7
Labour	J. Strachan	799	35.1
Labour	A. Titchener	791	34.8
Labour	M. Titchener	781	34.3
Turnout		~2,276	26.8
Registered electors		8,491	
Conservative win (new seat)			
Conservative win (new seat)			
Conservative win (new seat)			
Conservative win (new seat)			
