= 1973 Mid Suffolk District Council election =

1973 English local government election

- 10 May 1973

All 40 seats to Mid Suffolk District Council 21 seats needed for a majority

	First party	Second party
Party	Independent	Labour
Seats won	24	9
Popular vote	4,210	9,040
Percentage	23.3%	50.1%
	Third party	Fourth party
Party	Conservative	Liberal
Seats won	6	1
Popular vote	2,249	1,499
Percentage	12.5%	8.3%
Council control after election
Independent

The 1973 Mid Suffolk District Council election took place on 10 May 1973 to elect members of Mid Suffolk District Council in Suffolk, England. This was on the same day as other local elections.

This was the inaugural election to the council following its formation by the Local Government Act 1972.

== Summary ==
=== Election result ===
1973 Mid Suffolk District Council election
Party	Candidates	Seats	Gains	Losses	Net gain/loss	Seats %	Votes %	Votes	+/−
Independent	31	24	N/A	N/A	N/A	60.0	23.3	4,210	N/A
Labour	17	9	N/A	N/A	N/A	22.5	50.1	9,040	N/A
Conservative	10	6	N/A	N/A	N/A	15.0	12.5	2,249	N/A
Liberal	2	1	N/A	N/A	N/A	2.5	8.3	1,499	N/A
Independent Labour	1	0	N/A	N/A	N/A	0.0	5.9	1,063	N/A

== Ward results ==
=== Barham ===
Barham
Party	Candidate	Votes	%
Independent	J. Macrow	Unopposed	
Registered electors		1,238	
Independent win (new seat)			

=== Claydon ===
Claydon
Party	Candidate	Votes	%
Independent	J. Williams	Unopposed	
Registered electors		1,084	
Independent win (new seat)			

=== Creeting ===
Creeting
Party	Candidate	Votes	%
Independent	J. Ward	Unopposed	
Registered electors		1,045	
Independent win (new seat)			

=== Debenham ===
Debenham
Party	Candidate	Votes	%
Conservative	R. Glass	294	65.5
Labour	P. Erbe	155	34.5
Majority		139	31.0
Turnout		449	41.3
Registered electors		1,086	
Conservative win (new seat)			

=== Elmswell ===
Elmswell
Party	Candidate	Votes	%
Independent	D. Dyball	Unopposed	
Registered electors		1,093	
Independent win (new seat)			

=== Eye ===
Eye
Party	Candidate	Votes	%
Labour	C. Flatman	413	51.6
Independent	H. Havers	388	48.4
Majority		25	3.1
Turnout		801	58.2
Registered electors		1,376	
Labour win (new seat)			

=== Fressingfield ===
Fressingfield
Party	Candidate	Votes	%
Independent	B. Thurston	Unopposed	
Registered electors		1,030	
Independent win (new seat)			

=== Gislingham ===
Gislingham
Party	Candidate	Votes	%
Independent	P. Watson	333	64.3
Conservative	R. Chitty	185	35.7
Majority		148	28.6
Turnout		518	41.8
Registered electors		1,239	
Independent win (new seat)			

=== Haughley & Wetherden ===
Haughley & Wetherden
Party	Candidate	Votes	%
Labour	E. Crascall	Unopposed	
Registered electors		1,132	
Labour win (new seat)			

=== Helmingham ===
Helmingham
Party	Candidate	Votes	%
Independent	R. Willsher	Unopposed	
Registered electors		1,066	
Independent win (new seat)			

=== Hoxne ===
Hoxne
Party	Candidate	Votes	%
Conservative	W. McNamara	273	63.3
Labour	R. Gooderham	158	36.7
Majority		115	26.7
Turnout		431	37.0
Registered electors		1,164	
Conservative win (new seat)			

=== Mendlesham ===
Mendlesham
Party	Candidate	Votes	%
Independent	A. Braybrooke	Unopposed	
Registered electors		1,236	
Independent win (new seat)			

=== Needham Market ===
Needham Market
Party	Candidate	Votes	%
Conservative	J. Swain	428	47.1
Independent	S. Bugg	299	32.9
Labour	H. Phillips	181	19.9
Majority		129	14.2
Turnout		908	60.1
Registered electors		1,510	
Conservative win (new seat)			

=== No. 2 (Stowmarket) ===
No. 2 (Stowmarket) (6 seats)
Party	Candidate	Votes	%
Liberal	F. Brooke	1,247	27.0
Labour	R. Jones	1,195	25.9
Independent	R. Pattle	1,110	24.0
Labour	C. Soames	1,093	23.7
Labour	R. Hiron	1,082	23.4
Labour	E. Jones	1,068	23.1
Independent Labour	P. Howard	1,063	23.0
Labour	A. Clarke	917	19.9
Labour	E. Nunn	817	17.7
Turnout		~4,619	68.7
Registered electors		6,722	
Liberal win (new seat)			
Labour win (new seat)			
Independent win (new seat)			
Labour win (new seat)			
Labour win (new seat)			
Labour win (new seat)			

=== No. 5 (Ringshall) ===
No. 5 (Ringshall)
Party	Candidate	Votes	%
Independent	H. Crooks	219	63.3
Independent	H. Cartwright	78	22.5
Independent	A. Winchester	49	14.2
Majority		141	40.8
Turnout		346	33.9
Registered electors		1,021	
Independent win (new seat)			

=== No. 7 (Barking) ===
No. 7 (Barking)
Party	Candidate	Votes	%
Independent	E. Wilton	Unopposed	
Registered electors		1,112	
Independent win (new seat)			

=== No. 8 (Somersham) ===
No. 8 (Somersham)
Party	Candidate	Votes	%
Independent	S. Keyte	225	53.3
Independent	C. Bird	197	46.7
Majority		28	6.6
Turnout		422	33.8
Registered electors		1,249	
Independent win (new seat)			

=== No. 9 (Bramford) ===
No. 9 (Bramford)
Party	Candidate	Votes	%
Labour	G. Cunningham	244	62.7
Independent	E. Fisk	145	37.3
Majority		99	25.4
Turnout		389	24.3
Registered electors		1,600	
Labour win (new seat)			

=== No. 16 (Stowupland) ===
No. 16 (Stowupland) (2 seats)
Party	Candidate	Votes	%
Labour	A. Addison	595	40.6
Labour	M. Shave	458	31.2
Conservative	J. Carter	393	26.8
Liberal	S. Wilson	252	17.2
Independent	G. Leeks	226	15.4
Conservative	R. Groom	176	12.0
Turnout		~1,467	75.9
Registered electors		1,932	
Labour win (new seat)			
Labour win (new seat)			

=== No. 26 (Bacton) ===
No. 26 (Bacton)
Party	Candidate	Votes	%
Independent	V. Beake	Unopposed	
Registered electors		1,079	
Independent win (new seat)			

=== No. 28 (Walsham-le-Willows) ===
No. 28 (Walsham-le-Willows)
Party	Candidate	Votes	%
Conservative	S. Edwards	Unopposed	
Registered electors		924	
Conservative win (new seat)			

=== No. 29 (Badwell Ash) ===
No. 29 (Badwell Ash)
Party	Candidate	Votes	%
Independent	H. Linn	Unopposed	
Registered electors		991	
Independent win (new seat)			

=== No. 33 (Woolpit) ===
No. 33 (Woolpit)
Party	Candidate	Votes	%
Independent	R. Bland	Unopposed	
Registered electors		1,251	
Independent win (new seat)			

=== No. 34 (Rattlesden) ===
No. 34 (Rattlesden)
Party	Candidate	Votes	%
Conservative	L. Muir	Unopposed	
Registered electors		936	
Conservative win (new seat)			

=== Norton ===
Norton
Party	Candidate	Votes	%
Independent	F. Armstrong	Unopposed	
Registered electors		1,425	
Independent win (new seat)			

=== Onehouse ===
Onehouse
Party	Candidate	Votes	%
Independent	H. Mitson	Unopposed	
Registered electors		1,267	
Independent win (new seat)			

=== Palgrave ===
Palgrave
Party	Candidate	Votes	%
Independent	W. Wickett	362	67.0
Conservative	O. West	178	33.0
Majority		184	34.0
Turnout		540	45.8
Registered electors		1,179	
Independent win (new seat)			

=== Rickinghall ===
Rickinghall
Party	Candidate	Votes	%
Independent	M. Gowen	Unopposed	
Registered electors		1,353	
Independent win (new seat)			

=== Stonham ===
Stonham
Party	Candidate	Votes	%
Independent	R. Penistan	Unopposed	
Registered electors		1,034	
Independent win (new seat)			

=== Stradbroke ===
Stradbroke
Party	Candidate	Votes	%
Independent	S. Hawes	Unopposed	
Registered electors		1,019	
Independent win (new seat)			

=== Thurston ===
Thurston
Party	Candidate	Votes	%
Independent	P. Howes	251	60.8
Liberal	J. Moreland	162	39.2
Majority		89	21.5
Turnout		413	38.7
Registered electors		1,066	
Independent win (new seat)			

=== Wetheringsett ===
Wetheringsett
Party	Candidate	Votes	%
Independent	P. Sleigh	328	53.0
Labour	R. Mills	291	47.0
Majority		37	6.0
Turnout		619	52.4
Registered electors		1,182	
Independent win (new seat)			

=== Weybread ===
Weybread
Party	Candidate	Votes	%
Independent	F. Hadingham	Unopposed	
Registered electors		1,156	
Independent win (new seat)			

=== Worlingworth ===
Worlingworth
Party	Candidate	Votes	%
Conservative	R. Harvey	322	60.4
Labour	R. Bushby	211	39.6
Majority		111	20.8
Turnout		533	46.4
Registered electors		1,148	
Conservative win (new seat)			
