= 1973 Broxbourne Borough Council election =

1973 UK local government election

The Broxbourne Council election, 1973 was held to elect council members of the Broxbourne Borough Council, the local government authority of the borough of Broxbourne, Hertfordshire, England.

== Election results ==
Broxbourne local election result 1973
Party	Seats	Gains	Losses	Net gain/loss	Seats %	Votes %	Votes	+/−
Conservative	28	28	0	+28	70.00	58.74	25,523	
Labour	12	12	0	+12	30.00	37.11	16,124	
Liberal	0	0	0	0	0.00	2.78	1,209	
Independent	0	0	0	0	0.00	1.37	594	

== Results summary ==
The first election for Broxbourne Borough Council took place on 7 June 1973.

Broxbourne Borough Council was created by the Local Government Act 1972 as a successor authority to:

- Cheshunt Urban District Council
- Hoddesdon Urban District Council.

From the date of the election until 1 April 1974 Broxbourne Borough Council acted as a "shadow authority" to Cheshunt UDC and Hoddesdon UDC.

40 Borough Council seats were contested in 13 wards.

In 3 wards (Cheshunt North, Hoddesdon Northern and Theobalds) 4 council seats were contested

In 1 ward (Wormley) 1 council seat was contested

In the remaining 9 wards 3 council seats were contested.

The political balance of the newly formed Borough Council was

- Conservative 28 seats
- Labour 12 seats

== Ward results ==
Broxbourne Ward Result 3 Seats 7 June 1973
Party	Candidate	Votes	%	±%
Conservative	Joan Fiddy	756	27.62	
Conservative	Donald Smith	751	27.44	
Conservative	Ken Sandison	742	27.11	
Labour	Ernie Wilkinson	257	9.39	
Labour	Joseph Cole	231	8.44	
Turnout		2,737		

Bury Green Ward Result 3 Seats 7 June 1973
Party	Candidate	Votes	%	±%
Labour	Walter Payne	380	17.34	
Labour	Norman Robson	361	16.47	
Conservative	Benjamin Griffiths	349	15.92	
Labour	Eric Barker	319	14.55	
Conservative	Gordon Webster	306	13.96	
Conservative	David Avril	285	13.00	
Independent	Edwin Horlington	192	8.76	
Turnout		2,192	26.40	

Cheshunt Central Ward Result 3 Seats 7 June 1973
Party	Candidate	Votes	%	±%
Conservative	Leslie Parker	710	22.70	
Conservative	Douglas Breeze	674	21.55	
Conservative	George Batchelor	663	21.19	
Labour	Cherry Robbins	379	12.12	
Labour	John Tree	356	11.38	
Labour	Robert Montgomery	346	11.06	
Turnout		3,128	32.00	

Cheshunt North Ward Result 4 Seats 7 June 1973
Party	Candidate	Votes	%	±%
Conservative	Henry Armitage	756	13.32	
Conservative	Gerald Game	748	13.17	
Conservative	Doris Moody	734	12.92	
Conservative	Donald Poole	703	12.38	
Labour	Gordon Payne	504	8.87	
Labour	Simon Gosnell	501	8.82	
Labour	Martin Oliver	491	8.64	
Labour	Betty Tree	483	8.50	
Liberal	Peter Saunders	277	4.88	
Liberal	Ray Bomber	242	4.26	
Liberal	Bernice Flynn	241	4.24	
Turnout		5,680	30.50	

Flamstead End Ward Result 3 Seats 7 June 1973
Party	Candidate	Votes	%	±%
Conservative	Edith Larbales-Tier	572	18.87	
Conservative	James Swannell	464	15.30	
Labour	Pat Whitthread	416	13.93	
Conservative	Leonard Fortune	402	13.27	
Labour	Jean Stephens	377	12.44	
Labour	Bryan Davies	350	11.55	
Liberal	John Collins	160	5.28	
Liberal	George Norris	153	5.05	
Liberal	Francis Coyne	4.49		
Turnout		3,030	29.50	

Goffs Oak Ward Result 3 Seats 7 June 1973
Party	Candidate	Votes	%	±%
Conservative	Dan Hickman	1,020	28.51	
Conservative	Michael Janes	1,017	28.42	
Conservative	Ken Sanderson	972	27.17	
Labour	Carol Payne	204	5.70	
Labour	Norman Gray	192	5.37	
Labour	Edward Wright	173	4.83	
Turnout		3,578	29.40	

Hoddesdon Northern Ward Result 4 Seats 7 June 1973
Party	Candidate	Votes	%	±%
Conservative	John Hastings	974	17.68	
Conservative	Tony Kay	950	17.24	
Conservative	Joyce Ball	887	16.10	
Conservative	Gerald Walker	866	15.72	
Labour	Brenda Vincent	499	9.06	
Labour	Heidi Harrington	485	8.80	
Labour	Colin Rochester	447	8.11	
Independent	Arthur Liddard	402	7.29	
Turnout		5,510		

Hoddesdon Town Ward Result 3 Seats 7 June 1973
Party	Candidate	Votes	%	±%
Conservative	Percy Madsen	695	20.77	
Conservative	John Gray	693	20.72	
Conservative	Geoffrey Barnes	679	20.29	
Labour	Jim Harrington	437	13.06	
Labour	Ken Gregory	422	12.61	
Labour	Alec Cooper	420	12.55	
Turnout		3,346		

Rye Park Ward Result 3 Seats 7 June 1973
Party	Candidate	Votes	%	±%
Labour	John Davis	472	22.66	
Labour	Terry Pearson	450	21.60	
Labour	Reg Vincent	448	21.51	
Conservative	Geoffrey Conway	266	12.77	
Conservative	Dickie Bates	227	10.90	
Conservative	Irene Bates	220	10.56	
Turnout		2,083		

Theobalds Ward Result 4 Seats 7 June 1973
Party	Candidate	Votes	%	±%
Conservative	Malcolm Linscott	922	15.50	
Conservative	George Ebeling	874	14.69	
Conservative	Oliver Alderman	836	14.06	
Conservative	Herbert Collins	829	13.94	
Labour	Shelagh Farrington	668	11.23	
Labour	Roland Paice	616	10.36	
Labour	Roger Lawrence-Hyde	605	10.17	
Labour	Lillian Yeardye	598	10.05	
Turnout		5,948	32.90	

Waltham Cross East Ward Result 3 Seats 7 June 1973
Party	Candidate	Votes	%	±%
Labour	Pat Young	540	17.96	
Labour	Dr Alan Fletcher	527	17.54	
Labour	Chris Robbins	510	16.97	
Conservative	Sidney Johnson	502	16.70	
Conservative	Franklin Brace	470	15.63	
Conservative	Francis Dolan	457	15.20	
Turnout		3,006	34.50	

Waltham Cross West Ward Result 3 Seats 7 May 1973
Party	Candidate	Votes	%	±%
Labour	Mark Farrington	508	19.56	
Labour	Jean Paice	445	17.14	
Labour	Chris Prasad	439	16.90	
Conservative	Adrian Edeling	407	15.67	
Conservative	Karen Andrews	406	15.63	
Conservative	Linda Walker	392	15.10	
Turnout		2,597	28.50	

Wormley Ward Result 1 Seat 7 June 1973
Party	Candidate	Votes	%	±%
Conservative	John Beazley	347	56.42	
Labour	David Wall	268	43.58	
Majority		79		
Turnout		615		
