= 1973 Uttlesford District Council election =

1973 English local election

- 10 May 1973

All 42 seats to Uttlesford District Council 22 seats needed for a majority

	First party	Second party	Third party
Party	Conservative	Independent	Labour
Seats won	22	10	7
Popular vote	19,716	4,191	17,218
Percentage	44.6%	9.5%	39.0%
	Fourth party	Fifth party
Party	Liberal	Ind. Conservative
Seats won	2	1
Popular vote	3,059	0
Percentage	6.9%	0.0%
Council control after election
Conservative

The 1973 Uttlesford District Council election took place on 10 May 1973 to elect members of Uttlesford District Council in Essex, England.

This was the inaugural election of the council following its creation under the Local Government Act 1972.

== Summary ==
=== Election result ===
1973 Uttlesford District Council election
Party	Candidates	Seats	Gains	Losses	Net gain/loss	Seats %	Votes %	Votes	+/−
Conservative	33	22	N/A	N/A	N/A	52.4	44.6	19,716	N/A
Independent	21	10	N/A	N/A	N/A	23.8	9.5	4,191	N/A
Labour	25	7	N/A	N/A	N/A	16.7	39.0	17,218	N/A
Liberal	6	2	N/A	N/A	N/A	4.8	6.9	3,059	N/A
Ind. Conservative	1	1	N/A	N/A	N/A	2.4	0.0	0	N/A

== Ward results ==
=== Ashdon ===
Ashdon
Party	Candidate	Votes	%
Labour	R. Cooper	206	47.8
Independent	D. Collins	156	36.2
Independent	R. Heath	69	16.0
Majority		50	11.6
Turnout		431	54.6
Registered electors		789	
Labour win (new seat)			

=== Birchanger ===
Birchanger
Party	Candidate	Votes	%
Conservative	D. Haagerwood	234	52.9
Labour	D. Cooke	208	47.1
Majority		26	5.9
Turnout		442	54.4
Registered electors		813	
Conservative win (new seat)			

=== Clavering ===
Clavering
Party	Candidate	Votes	%
Ind. Conservative	E. Abrahams	Unopposed	
Registered electors		1,118	
Ind. Conservative win (new seat)			

=== Elsenham ===
Elsenham
Party	Candidate	Votes	%
Conservative	J. Hurwitz	324	63.8
Labour	R. Shaw	184	36.2
Majority		140	27.5
Turnout		508	56.7
Registered electors		896	
Conservative win (new seat)			

=== Felsted ===
Felsted (2 seats)
Party	Candidate	Votes	%
Conservative	J. Franklyn	346	60.2
Conservative	W. Wright	244	42.5
Independent	J. Guthrie-Dow	229	39.9
Independent	G. Savage	178	31.0
Independent	J. Barrington-Bull	108	18.8
Turnout		~575	26.8
Registered electors		2,144	
Conservative win (new seat)			
Conservative win (new seat)			

=== Great Hallingbury ===
Great Hallingbury
Party	Candidate	Votes	%
Independent	A. Streeter	Unopposed	
Registered electors		698	
Independent win (new seat)			

=== Hatfield Broad Oak ===
Hatfield Broad Oak
Party	Candidate	Votes	%
Conservative	L. Silverston	253	65.4
Labour	B. Clark	134	34.6
Majority		119	30.6
Turnout		387	44.5
Registered electors		870	
Conservative win (new seat)			

=== Hatfield Heath ===
Hatfield Heath
Party	Candidate	Votes	%
Conservative	E. Dearlove	284	50.4
Labour	R. Howard	215	38.1
Independent	R. Parkinson	65	11.5
Majority		69	12.2
Turnout		564	52.7
Registered electors		1,071	
Conservative win (new seat)			

=== Henham ===
Henham
Party	Candidate	Votes	%
Conservative	J. Maitland	Unopposed	
Registered electors		1,069	
Conservative win (new seat)			

=== Little Hallingbury ===
Little Hallingbury
Party	Candidate	Votes	%
Conservative	W. Dorman	Unopposed	
Registered electors		965	
Conservative win (new seat)			

=== Littlebury ===
Littlebury
Party	Candidate	Votes	%
Conservative	J. Northridge	245	64.8
Labour	I. Haig	133	35.2
Majority		112	29.6
Turnout		378	52.4
Registered electors		722	
Conservative win (new seat)			

=== Newport ===
Newport
Party	Candidate	Votes	%
Conservative	H. Reynolds	Unopposed	
Registered electors		1,084	
Conservative win (new seat)			

=== No. 1 (Saffron Walden) ===
No. 1 (Saffron Walden) (8 seats)
Party	Candidate	Votes	%
Labour	P. Preece	2,034	38.8
Labour	D. Weaver	1,903	36.3
Conservative	D. Miller	1,864	35.5
Labour	R. Green	1,633	31.1
Labour	K. Wilson	1,630	31.1
Conservative	S. Neville	1,609	30.7
Conservative	P. Collins	1,594	30.4
Conservative	J. Wakeford	1,574	30.0
Conservative	F. Brooke	1,461	27.8
Labour	P. Tinnion	1,432	27.3
Liberal	D. Benson	1,353	25.8
Labour	K. Tinnion	1,319	25.1
Conservative	E. McCleod	1,309	24.9
Labour	G. Scrivener	1,308	24.9
Conservative	R. Bower	1,252	23.9
Conservative	M. Stayner	1,113	21.2
Labour	A. Bird	1,109	21.1
Turnout		~5,249	67.3
Registered electors		7,799	
Labour win (new seat)			
Labour win (new seat)			
Conservative win (new seat)			
Labour win (new seat)			
Labour win (new seat)			
Conservative win (new seat)			
Conservative win (new seat)			
Conservative win (new seat)			

=== No. 4 (Great Dunmow) ===
No. 4 (Great Dunmow) (4 seats)
Party	Candidate	Votes	%
Conservative	M. Davey	926	37.4
Liberal	J. Garrett	790	31.9
Labour	H. Wright	759	30.6
Conservative	V. Culf	687	27.7
Conservative	D. Lloyd-Jones	672	27.1
Conservative	S. Hopkins	618	25.0
Labour	C. Monk	514	20.8
Labour	G. Jones	457	18.5
Labour	F. Brown	361	14.6
Turnout		~2,477	64.0
Registered electors		3,870	
Conservative win (new seat)			
Liberal win (new seat)			
Labour win (new seat)			
Conservative win (new seat)			

=== No. 21 (Stort Valley) ===
No. 21 (Stort Valley)
Party	Candidate	Votes	%
Conservative	D. Collins	213	48.1
Labour	R. Clarke	124	28.0
Independent	P. Hawes	106	23.9
Majority		89	20.0
Turnout		443	48.8
Registered electors		908	
Conservative win (new seat)			

=== Rickling ===
Rickling
Party	Candidate	Votes	%
Conservative	P. Wawn	174	38.3
Liberal	D. Wraith	145	31.9
Independent	J. Brooke-Smith	135	29.7
Majority		29	6.3
Turnout		454	61.8
Registered electors		735	
Conservative win (new seat)			

=== Stansted Mountfitchet ===
Stansted Mountfitchet (3 seats)
Party	Candidate	Votes	%
Liberal	P. Clark	661	32.7
Conservative	G. Clark	503	24.8
Labour	G. Dimond	440	21.7
Conservative	A. Snudden	435	21.5
Independent	H. Sanders	421	20.8
Liberal	D. Honour	354	17.5
Liberal	P. Clifford	346	17.1
Conservative	M. Colton	344	17.0
Labour	P. Saban	232	11.5
Turnout		~2,024	58.8
Registered electors		3,443	
Liberal win (new seat)			
Conservative win (new seat)			
Labour win (new seat)			

=== Stebbing ===
Stebbing
Party	Candidate	Votes	%
Independent	E. Kiddle	400	64.2
Conservative	H. Wiseman	223	35.8
Majority		177	28.3
Turnout		623	62.2
Registered electors		1,002	
Independent win (new seat)			

=== Takeley ===
Takeley (2 seats)
Party	Candidate	Votes	%
Independent	H. Bradford	Unopposed	
Independent	W. Dudgeon	Unopposed	
Registered electors		2,117	
Independent win (new seat)			
Independent win (new seat)			

=== Thaxted ===
Thaxted (2 seats)
Party	Candidate	Votes	%
Independent	H. Craig	580	59.4
Independent	I. Barnard	565	57.8
Labour	G. Fraenkel	398	40.7
Labour	K. Cowell	294	30.1
Turnout		~977	54.2
Registered electors		1,803	
Independent win (new seat)			
Independent win (new seat)			

=== The Canfields ===
The Canfields
Party	Candidate	Votes	%
Independent	K. Fidler	442	62.1
Conservative	K. Tetley-Jones	270	37.9
Majority		172	24.1
Turnout		712	57.0
Registered electors		1,250	
Independent win (new seat)			

=== The Chesterfords ===
The Chesterfords
Party	Candidate	Votes	%
Independent	J. Moore	Unopposed	
Registered electors		891	
Independent win (new seat)			

=== The Eastons ===
The Eastons
Party	Candidate	Votes	%
Conservative	F. Askew	351	63.7
Liberal	A. Proudley	200	36.3
Majority		151	27.3
Turnout		551	60.3
Registered electors		914	
Conservative win (new seat)			

=== The Rodings ===
The Rodings
Party	Candidate	Votes	%
Conservative	K. Tivendale	Unopposed	
Registered electors		846	
Conservative win (new seat)			

=== The Sampfords ===
The Sampfords
Party	Candidate	Votes	%
Independent	H. Hughes	266	39.5
Conservative	K. Baker	265	39.4
Labour	S. Slee	80	11.9
Independent	R. Bassett	62	9.2
Majority		1	0.1
Turnout		673	60.8
Registered electors		1,106	
Independent win (new seat)			

=== Wenden Lofts ===
Wenden Lofts
Party	Candidate	Votes	%
Independent	B. Erith	230	56.2
Independent	S. Cooper	179	43.8
Majority		51	12.4
Turnout		409	43.9
Registered electors		932	
Independent win (new seat)			

=== Wimbish & Debden ===
Wimbish & Debden
Party	Candidate	Votes	%
Conservative	J. Tomblin	329	74.8
Labour	D. Fowler-Dixon	111	25.2
Majority		218	49.4
Turnout		440	39.9
Registered electors		1,102	
Conservative win (new seat)			
