= King's Lynn and West Norfolk Borough Council elections =

Local government elections in Norfolk, England

King's Lynn and West Norfolk District Council in Norfolk, England is elected every four years. Since the last boundary changes in 2019, 55 councillors have been elected from 35 wards.

== Council elections ==
- 1973 West Norfolk District Council election
- 1976 West Norfolk District Council election
- 1979 West Norfolk District Council election
- 1983 King's Lynn and West Norfolk Borough Council election (New ward boundaries)
- 1987 King's Lynn and West Norfolk Borough Council election
- 1991 King's Lynn and West Norfolk Borough Council election (Borough boundary changes took place but the number of seats remained the same)
- 1995 King's Lynn and West Norfolk Borough Council election
- 1999 King's Lynn and West Norfolk Borough Council election
- 2003 King's Lynn and West Norfolk Borough Council election (New ward boundaries increased the number of seats by 2)
- 2007 King's Lynn and West Norfolk Borough Council election
- 2011 King's Lynn and West Norfolk Borough Council election
- 2015 King's Lynn and West Norfolk Borough Council election
- 2019 King's Lynn and West Norfolk Borough Council election (New ward boundaries)
- 2023 King's Lynn and West Norfolk Borough Council election

== Council composition ==
Year	Conservative	Labour	Liberal Democrats (Note: Includes totals for the predecessors of the Liberal Democrats, the Liberal Party and SDP (both of which participated in the Alliance).)	Green	Independents & Others	Council control after election
Local government reorganisation; council established (60 seats)
1973	14	22	0	–	24	No overall control
1976	37	13	0	0	10	Conservative
1979	42	15	0	0	3	Conservative
New ward boundaries (60 seats)
1983	42	15	1	0	2	Conservative
1987	46	11	2	0	1	Conservative
1991	30	16	5	0	9 (Note: Including 1 Independent Conservative)	No overall control
1995	14	37	6	0	3	Labour
1999	25	26	5	0	4 (Note: 2 vacant seats)	No overall control
New ward boundaries (62 seats)
2003	34	15	7	0	6	Conservative
2007	52	4	4	0	2	Conservative
2011	42	13	3	1	3	Conservative
2015	50	10	0	0	2	Conservative
New ward boundaries (55 seats)
2019	28	10	1	1	15	Conservative
2023	21	11	3	2	18	No overall control

== Result maps ==
1983 results map

1987 results map

1991 results map

1995 results map

1999 results map

2003 results map

2007 results map

2011 results map

2019 results map

2023 results map

== By-election results ==
=== 1995-1999 ===
Upwell, Outwell and Delph By-Election 30 January 1997
Party	Candidate	Votes	%	±%
Labour		540	48.3	
Conservative		491	43.9	
Liberal Democrats		87	7.8	
Majority		49	4.4	
Turnout		1,118	27.4	
Labour gain from Conservative		Swing		

Lynn South West By-Election 1 May 1997
Party	Candidate	Votes	%	±%
Labour		1,094	60.1	−21.8
Conservative		482	26.5	+8.4
Liberal Democrats		243	13.4	+13.4
Majority		612	33.6	
Turnout		1,819		
Labour hold		Swing		

West Winch By-Election 7 May 1998
Party	Candidate	Votes	%	±%
Conservative		402	40.1	+2.2
Labour		259	25.8	−31.9
Liberal Democrats		210	21.0	+21.0
Independent		131	13.1	+13.1
Majority		143	14.3	
Turnout		1,002		
Conservative gain from Labour		Swing		

Denver By-Election 9 July 1998
Party	Candidate	Votes	%	±%
Conservative		271	55.6	+17.0
Labour		165	33.9	−7.8
Liberal Democrats		51	10.5	−9.2
Majority		106	21.7	
Turnout		487	26.9	
Conservative gain from Labour		Swing		

=== 1999-2003 ===
Lynn Central By-Election 17 June 1999 (2)
Party	Candidate	Votes	%	±%
Labour		325		
Conservative		275		
Labour		256		
Conservative		250		
Liberal Democrats		114		
Liberal Democrats		100		
Turnout		1,320		
Labour hold		Swing		
Conservative gain from Labour		Swing		

=== 2003-2007 ===
Rudham By-Election 19 June 2003
Party	Candidate	Votes	%	±%
Conservative		592	62.6	+21.8
Labour		353	37.4	−14.5
Majority		239	25.2	
Turnout		945	50.0	
Conservative gain from Labour		Swing		

Heacham By-Election 19 February 2004
Party	Candidate	Votes	%	±%
Conservative	Andrew Morrison	852	44.2	+23.4
Labour		590	30.6	+12.1
Independent		487	25.2	−35.4
Majority		262	13.6	
Turnout		1,929	47.0	
Conservative gain from Independent		Swing		

Snettisham By-Election 16 December 2004
Party	Candidate	Votes	%	±%
Conservative		437	47.2	+18.6
Liberal Democrats		247	26.7	+26.7
Labour		121	13.1	−0.9
Independent		120	13.0	−44.5
Majority		190	20.5	
Turnout		925	26.4	
Conservative gain from Independent		Swing		

Hunstanton By-Election 6 July 2006
Party	Candidate	Votes	%	±%
Conservative	Richard Searle	908	55.5	+14.3
Labour	Richard Bird	727	44.5	+13.8
Majority		181	11.0	
Turnout		1,635	33.2	
Conservative hold		Swing		

=== 2007-2011 ===
Gaywood Chase By-Election 13 August 2009
Party	Candidate	Votes	%	±%
Conservative	Anthony Dobson	202	28.7	−17.4
Labour	John Collop	194	27.5	−10.2
Liberal Democrats	Ian Swinton	167	23.7	+23.7
BNP	David Fleming	90	12.8	+12.8
Green	Vivienne Manning	52	7.4	+7.4
Majority		8	1.2	
Turnout		705	18.0	
Conservative hold		Swing		

=== 2011-2015 ===
Spellowfields By-election 27 September 2012
Party	Candidate	Votes	%	±%
Conservative	Sheila Young	348	45.7	+6.0
Labour	Ken Hubbard	243	31.9	+5.6
UKIP	Michael Stone	88	11.5	+11.5
Green	Rob Archer	61	8.0	+8.0
Liberal Democrats	Ian Swinton	22	2.9	+2.9
Majority		105	13.8	
Turnout		762		
Conservative hold		Swing		

Snettisham By-election 2 May 2013
Party	Candidate	Votes	%	±%
Conservative	Avril Wright	593	48.7	−20.6
UKIP	Michael Stone	361	29.7	+29.7
Labour	Richard Pennington	263	21.6	−9.1
Majority		232	19.1	
Turnout		1,217		
Conservative hold		Swing		

Watlington By-election 13 June 2013
Party	Candidate	Votes	%	±%
UKIP	Ashley Collins	179	45.5	+45.5
Conservative	John Dobson	115	29.3	+29.3
Labour	Emilia Rust	99	25.2	+7.7
Majority		64	16.3	
Turnout		393		
UKIP gain from Liberal Democrats		Swing		

Burnham By-election 6 March 2014
Party	Candidate	Votes	%	±%
Conservative	Sam Sandell	374	78.4	+5.6
UKIP	Jean Smith	103	21.6	+21.6
Majority		271	56.8	
Turnout		477		
Conservative hold		Swing		

Airfield By-election 17 July 2014
Party	Candidate	Votes	%	±%
Conservative	Geoff Hipperson	305	45.7	+2.4
UKIP	Bob Scully	233	34.9	+34.9
Green	Jonathan Burr	72	10.8	−10.6
Labour	Sebastian Polhill	57	8.5	−11.1
Majority		72	56.8	
Turnout		10.8		
Conservative gain from Green		Swing		

=== 2015-2019 ===
Valley Hill By-election 16 June 2016
Party	Candidate	Votes	%	±%
Conservative	Tim Tilbrook	266	41.0	+6.9
Labour	Edward Robb	157	24.2	+24.2
Liberal Democrats	Kate Sayer	102	15.7	+15.7
UKIP	Andrew Carr	96	14.8	+14.8
Green	Andrew de Whalley	27	4.2	+4.2
Majority		109	16.8	
Turnout		648		
Conservative gain from Independent		Swing		

Heacham By-election 20 October 2016
Party	Candidate	Votes	%	±%
Independent	Terence Parish	400	37.7	N/A
Conservative	Simon Eyre	342	32.2	−38.9
Liberal Democrats	Robert Colwell	83	7.8	N/A
UKIP	Deborah Lemay	83	7.8	N/A
Independent	Michael Press	79	7.4	N/A
Labour	Edward Robb	74	7.0	−21.9
Majority		58	5.5	
Turnout		1,064	26.27	
Independent gain from Conservative		Swing		

Fairstead By-election 11 May 2017
Party	Candidate	Votes	%	±%
Labour	Gary Howman	254	44.0	+5.3
Conservative	Ronald Mortimer	189	32.8	+2.3
UKIP	Michael Stone	68	11.8	−19.0
Liberal Democrats	Rob Colwell	66	11.4	N/A
Majority		65		
Turnout			12.8	
Labour hold		Swing		

St Margarets with St Nicholas By-election 3 August 2017
Party	Candidate	Votes	%	±%
Conservative	Mike Taylor	253	36.2	−6.6
Labour	Francis Bone	210	30.0	−3.2
Liberal Democrats	Helen Russell-Johnson	173	24.7	+24.7
Green	Rob Archer	63	9.0	−15.1
Majority		43	6.2	
Turnout		699		
Conservative gain from Labour		Swing		

Snettisham By-election 2 August 2018
Party	Candidate	Votes	%	±%
Conservative	Stuart Dark	613	77.4	+6.7
Liberal Democrats	Erika Coward	66	8.3	+8.3
Green	Nigel Walker	65	8.2	+8.2
UKIP	Matthew Hannay	48	6.1	+6.1
Majority		547	69.1	
Turnout		792		
Conservative hold		Swing		

=== 2019-2023 ===
Upwell and Delph By-election 12 December 2019
Party	Candidate	Votes	%	±%
Conservative	Vivienne Spikings	2,126	66.4	+28.5
Labour	Stewart Dickson	637	19.9	+19.9
Independent	Terry Hipsey	438	13.7	+13.7
Majority		1,489	46.5	
Turnout		3,201		
Conservative gain from Independent		Swing		

Gaywood Clock By-election 1 December 2022
Party	Candidate	Votes	%	±%
Labour	Alex Ware	N/A	N/A	N/A
Labour hold		Swing		

=== 2023-2027 ===
Fairstead By-election 5 June 2025
Party	Candidate	Votes	%	±%
Reform	Jacqueline Fry	289	39.1	
Liberal Democrats	Crystal Colwell	275	37.2	
Labour	Michelle Carter	118	16.0	
Green	Ian Milburn	36	4.9	
Independent	Benjamin Lemmon	21	2.8	
Majority		14	1.9	
Turnout		739		
Reform gain from Labour		Swing		

North Lynn By-election 5 June 2025
Party	Candidate	Votes	%	±%
Reform	Austen Moore	278	49.6	
Liberal Democrats	Geri Sayers	123	22.0	
Labour	Wilfred Lambert	107	19.1	
Green	Rob Archer	52	9.3	
Majority		155	27.7	
Turnout		560		
Reform gain from Labour		Swing		

Hunstanton By-election 27 November 2025
Party	Candidate	Votes	%	±%
Reform	Fred Pidcock	368	29.2	+29.2
Liberal Democrats	Tammy Edmunds	322	25.6	+25.6
Independent	Howard Johnston	229	18.2	+18.2
Conservative	Ade Adeyemo	224	17.8	−23.0
Independent	David Nice	77	6.1	−28.9
Labour	Christopher Heneghan	40	3.2	−21.0
Majority		46	3.7	
Turnout		1,260		
Reform gain from Independent		Swing		

Heacham By-election 6 August 2026
Party	Candidate	Votes	%	±%
Reform	Paul Powers	289	37.8	+37.8
Liberal Democrats	Rachael Windsor	219	28.7	+28.7
Conservative	Ade Adeyemo	163	21.3	−3.9
Labour	Ken Hubbard	93	12.2	−11.4
Majority		70	9.2	
Turnout		764		
Reform gain from Conservative		Swing		

Snettisham By-election 6 August 2026
Party	Candidate	Votes	%	±%
Reform	Ben Griffin	229	35.1	+35.1
Liberal Democrats	Lee Henson	211	32.3	+32.3
Conservative	Lissie Macfarlane	169	25.9	−25.8
Labour	Wilf Lambert	44	6.7	−11.4
Majority		18	2.8	
Turnout		653		
Reform gain from Conservative		Swing		
