= 1973 West Norfolk District Council election =

1973 English local election

- 10 May 1973

All 60 seats to West Norfolk District Council 31 seats needed for a majority
- Registered: 82,267
- Turnout: ~43.5%

	First party	Second party
Party	Labour	Independent
Seats won	22	19
Popular vote	27,658	14,633
Percentage	41.1%	21.8%
	Third party	Fourth party
Party	Conservative	Ind. Conservative
Seats won	14	5
Popular vote	19,912	1,861
Percentage	29.6%	2.8%
Control after election
No overall control

The 1973 West Norfolk District Council election took place on 10 May 1973 to elect members of West Norfolk District Council in Norfolk, England. This was on the same day as other local elections.

This was the inaugural election to West Norfolk District Council, with the council having been recently established by the Local Government Act 1972.

== Summary ==
=== Election result ===
1973 West Norfolk District Council election
Party	Candidates	Seats	Gains	Losses	Net gain/loss	Seats %	Votes %	Votes	+/−
Labour	45	22	N/A	N/A	N/A	36.7	41.1	27,658	N/A
Independent	43	19	N/A	N/A	N/A	31.7	21.8	14,633	N/A
Conservative	33	14	N/A	N/A	N/A	23.3	29.6	19,912	N/A
Ind. Conservative	9	5	N/A	N/A	N/A	8.3	2.8	1,861	N/A
Liberal	10	0	N/A	N/A	N/A	0.0	4.7	3,173	N/A

2 Conservative and 2 Independent Conservative candidates were elected unopposed.

== Ward results ==
=== Airfield ===
Airfield (2 seats)
Party	Candidate	Votes	%
Conservative	J. Bagge	635	53.6
Conservative	S. Pope	613	51.7
Labour	W. Holding	549	46.3
Labour	R. Gudgton	321	27.1
Turnout		~1,185	42.3
Registered electors		2,802	
Conservative win (new seat)			
Conservative win (new seat)			

=== Burnham ===
Burnham
Party	Candidate	Votes	%
Independent	E. Coke	434	51.0
Labour	B. Phillips	417	49.0
Majority		17	2.0
Turnout		851	62.8
Registered electors		1,355	
Independent win (new seat)			

=== Clenchwarton ===
Clenchwarton
Party	Candidate	Votes	%
Ind. Conservative	R. Kerkham	268	47.8
Labour	F. Mallett	193	34.4
Independent	F. Eggett	100	17.8
Majority		75	13.4
Turnout		561	38.5
Registered electors		1,457	
Ind. Conservative win (new seat)			

=== Creake ===
Creake
Party	Candidate	Votes	%
Independent	F. Perowne	457	53.3
Labour	O. Sands	400	46.7
Majority		57	6.7
Turnout		857	64.4
Registered electors		1,331	
Independent win (new seat)			

=== Denton ===
Denton (3 seats)
Party	Candidate	Votes	%
Conservative	F. Neville	775	39.9
Conservative	M. Jones	659	33.9
Labour	J. Waterfall	659	33.9
Conservative	J. Wood	624	32.1
Labour	F. Thompson	603	31.1
Independent	I. Smith	506	26.1
Independent	W. Ayres	504	26.0
Labour	W. Watkins	475	24.5
Independent	T. Bowers	454	23.4
Independent	F. Hyam	208	10.7
Turnout		~1,942	53.5
Registered electors		3,629	
Conservative win (new seat)			
Conservative win (new seat)			
Labour win (new seat)			

=== Dersingham ===
Dersingham (2 seats)
Party	Candidate	Votes	%
Labour	P. Thaxter	718	44.3
Conservative	I. Stockwell	716	44.2
Conservative	B. Griffiths	675	41.6
Labour	M. Nurse	622	38.4
Independent	L. Firth	188	11.6
Turnout		~1,621	62.1
Registered electors		2,610	
Labour win (new seat)			
Conservative win (new seat)			

=== Docking ===
Docking
Party	Candidate	Votes	%
Labour	D. Ford	412	54.6
Independent	S. Mace	342	45.4
Majority		70	9.3
Turnout		754	57.4
Registered electors		1,313	
Labour win (new seat)			

=== Emneth ===
Emneth
Party	Candidate	Votes	%
Independent	A. Terrington	330	44.4
Independent	C. Peckover	225	30.3
Independent	C. Coates	188	25.3
Majority		105	14.1
Turnout		743	50.7
Registered electors		1,466	
Independent win (new seat)			

=== Gayton ===
Gayton
Party	Candidate	Votes	%
Ind. Conservative	I. Major	436	60.7
Independent	J. Bacon	282	39.3
Majority		154	21.4
Turnout		718	59.6
Registered electors		1,204	
Ind. Conservative win (new seat)			

=== Lynn South West ===
Lynn South West (2 seats)
Party	Candidate	Votes	%
Labour	D. Benefer	750	76.3
Labour	W. Baker	710	72.2
Conservative	N. Lumb	234	23.8
Conservative	R. Mears	193	19.7
Turnout		~983	34.2
Registered electors		2,873	
Labour win (new seat)			
Labour win (new seat)			

=== Mershe Lande ===
Mershe Lande
Party	Candidate	Votes	%
Ind. Conservative	H. Goose	Unopposed	
Registered electors		1,394	
Ind. Conservative win (new seat)			

=== Middleton ===
Middleton
Party	Candidate	Votes	%
Independent	D. Burrell	321	60.5
Labour	T. Squirrell	210	39.5
Majority		111	20.9
Turnout		531	37.2
Registered electors		1,429	
Independent win (new seat)			

=== No. 1 (Kings Lynn: Gaywood) ===
No. 1 (Kings Lynn: Gaywood) (6 seats)
Party	Candidate	Votes	%
Labour	E. Shaw	1,382	42.8
Labour	A. Campbell	1,358	42.0
Labour	A. West	1,349	41.8
Labour	F. Ackland	1,344	41.6
Labour	J. Carney	1,294	40.0
Labour	M. Pantling	1,278	39.6
Conservative	P. Robinson	1,271	39.4
Conservative	F. Barton	1,265	39.2
Conservative	R. Fraulo	1,252	38.8
Conservative	P. Robinson	1,244	38.5
Conservative	J. Steele	1,165	36.1
Conservative	S. Brown	1,124	34.8
Liberal	R. Hubbard	582	18.0
Liberal	D. Harbour	464	14.4
Liberal	R. Whiley	419	13.0
Liberal	G. Hathorn	416	12.9
Turnout		~3,231	39.1
Registered electors		8,264	
Labour win (new seat)			
Labour win (new seat)			
Labour win (new seat)			
Labour win (new seat)			
Labour win (new seat)			
Labour win (new seat)			

=== No. 2 (Kings Lynn: North) ===
No. 2 (Kings Lynn: North) (4 seats)
Party	Candidate	Votes	%
Labour	H. Birdseye	1,340	85.7
Labour	F. Juniper	1,334	85.3
Labour	A. Panks	1,323	84.6
Labour	F. Panks	1,280	81.8
Conservative	A. Bridge	224	14.3
Conservative	N. Nulty	214	13.7
Conservative	K. Donnelly	209	13.4
Conservative	M. Purdy	203	13.0
Turnout		~1,564	31.7
Registered electors		4,934	
Labour win (new seat)			
Labour win (new seat)			
Labour win (new seat)			
Labour win (new seat)			

=== No. 5 (Kings Lynn: Chase & Central) ===
No. 5 (Kings Lynn: Chase & Central) (3 seats)
Party	Candidate	Votes	%
Conservative	R. Dawson	692	46.9
Conservative	F. Cork	690	46.8
Conservative	B. Barton	666	45.2
Liberal	B. Goldstone	418	28.4
Labour	S. Roberts	366	24.8
Labour	E. Falcini	312	21.2
Liberal	J. Hubbard	268	18.2
Liberal	D. Green	261	17.7
Labour	E. Lewis	244	16.6
Turnout		~1,475	38.2
Registered electors		3,861	
Conservative win (new seat)			
Conservative win (new seat)			
Conservative win (new seat)			

=== No. 6 (Downham Market) ===
No. 6 (Downham Market) (2 seats)
Party	Candidate	Votes	%
Conservative	J. Bostock	964	56.6
Labour	R. Taylor	738	43.4
Conservative	J. Reed	686	40.3
Turnout		~1,702	53.9
Registered electors		3,157	
Conservative win (new seat)			
Labour win (new seat)			

=== No. 7 (Hunstanton) ===
No. 7 (Hunstanton) (2 seats)
Party	Candidate	Votes	%
Independent	L. Brown	999	100.1
Independent	T. Legge	924	92.6
Independent	D. Popplewell	610	61.1
Turnout		~998	30.8
Registered electors		3,240	
Independent win (new seat)			
Independent win (new seat)			

=== No. 9 (Heacham) ===
No. 9 (Heacham) (2 seats)
Party	Candidate	Votes	%
Labour	J. Wells	600	39.0
Independent	E. Gidney	498	32.3
Labour	B. Smith	477	31.0
Ind. Conservative	R. Joyce	443	28.8
Turnout		~1,540	53.8
Registered electors		2,862	
Labour win (new seat)			
Independent win (new seat)			

=== No. 17 (Stoke Ferry) ===
No. 17 (Stoke Ferry)
Party	Candidate	Votes	%
Ind. Conservative	R. Wilde	Unopposed	
Registered electors		1,282	
Ind. Conservative win (new seat)			

=== No. 18 (Denver) ===
No. 18 (Denver)
Party	Candidate	Votes	%
Conservative	E. Pratt	Unopposed	
Registered electors		1,423	
Conservative win (new seat)			

=== No. 19 (Wimbotsham) ===
No. 19 (Wimbotsham)
Party	Candidate	Votes	%
Independent	H. Grazier	305	53.7
Conservative	J. Forgan	263	46.3
Majority		42	7.4
Turnout		568	43.7
Registered electors		1,299	
Independent win (new seat)			

=== No. 20 (Welney) ===
No. 20 (Welney)
Party	Candidate	Votes	%
Conservative	H. Rose	Unopposed	
Registered electors		1,260	
Conservative win (new seat)			

=== No. 25 (South Wootton) ===
No. 25 (South Wootton)
Party	Candidate	Votes	%
Independent	M. Bowskill	459	64.2
Liberal	J. Smallwood	157	22.0
Labour	G. Falcini	99	13.8
Majority		302	42.2
Turnout		715	40.6
Registered electors		1,762	
Independent win (new seat)			

=== No. 26 (North Wootton) ===
No. 26 (North Wootton)
Party	Candidate	Votes	%
Independent	G. Parker	319	54.4
Labour	B. King	267	45.6
Majority		52	8.9
Turnout		586	45.4
Registered electors		1,290	
Independent win (new seat)			

=== No. 27 (Massingham) ===
No. 27 (Massingham)
Party	Candidate	Votes	%
Independent	J. Tilbury	361	44.8
Labour	R. Rearco	225	28.0
Ind. Conservative	M. Neave	219	27.2
Majority		136	16.9
Turnout		805	63.6
Registered electors		1,266	
Independent win (new seat)			

=== No. 28 (Grimston) ===
No. 28 (Grimston)
Party	Candidate	Votes	%
Independent	J. Reader	312	55.0
Labour	A. Hooks	225	39.7
Independent	R. Crouch	30	5.3
Majority		87	15.3
Turnout		567	39.9
Registered electors		1,422	
Independent win (new seat)			

=== No. 40 (Outwell & Upwell) ===
No. 40 (Outwell & Upwell) (2 seats)
Party	Candidate	Votes	%
Conservative	E. Feary	722	52.6
Independent	S. Booley	650	47.4
Conservative	J. Shepherd	535	39.0
Independent	A. Calver	189	13.8
Turnout		~1,372	62.9
Registered electors		2,182	
Conservative win (new seat)			
Independent win (new seat)			

=== North Coast ===
North Coast
Party	Candidate	Votes	%
Independent	H. Middleton	390	44.2
Independent	R. Gibbs	316	35.8
Liberal	M. Watterson	119	13.5
Independent	M. Linge	57	6.5
Majority		74	8.4
Turnout		882	57.1
Registered electors		1,546	
Independent win (new seat)			

=== Priory ===
Priory
Party	Candidate	Votes	%
Labour	G. Sandle	400	72.6
Independent	G. Berry	151	27.4
Majority		249	45.2
Turnout		551	47.7
Registered electors		1,154	
Labour win (new seat)			

=== Rudham ===
Rudham
Party	Candidate	Votes	%
Labour	B. Seaman	380	70.8
Ind. Conservative	T. Ringer	157	29.2
Majority		223	41.6
Turnout		537	49.5
Registered electors		1,084	
Labour win (new seat)			

=== Snettisham ===
Snettisham
Party	Candidate	Votes	%
Ind. Conservative	S. Hunt	208	32.5
Independent	F. Barwick	135	21.1
Ind. Conservative	E. Ford	130	20.3
Labour	F. Berry	98	15.3
Liberal	P. Norwood	69	10.8
Majority		73	11.4
Turnout		640	44.6
Registered electors		1,436	
Ind. Conservative win (new seat)			

=== Spellowfields ===
Spellowfields (2 seats)
Party	Candidate	Votes	%
Independent	H. Ward	724	36.9
Labour	S. Ludlow	701	35.7
Conservative	B. Howling	538	27.4
Labour	W. Cowen	415	21.1
Turnout		~1,964	73.0
Registered electors		2,690	
Independent win (new seat)			
Labour win (new seat)			

=== St. Lawrence ===
St. Lawrence
Party	Candidate	Votes	%
Independent	C. Burman	401	55.8
Labour	F. Holland	317	44.2
Majority		84	11.6
Turnout		718	47.1
Registered electors		1,524	
Independent win (new seat)			

=== St. Margarets ===
St. Margarets
Party	Candidate	Votes	%
Labour	E. Edgley	460	64.4
Conservative	P. Welch	254	35.6
Majority		206	28.8
Turnout		714	44.8
Registered electors		1,593	
Labour win (new seat)			

=== Ten Mile ===
Ten Mile
Party	Candidate	Votes	%
Labour	J. Simper	424	60.1
Independent	A. Dent	281	39.9
Majority		143	20.2
Turnout		705	40.0
Registered electors		1,762	
Labour win (new seat)			

=== The Walpoles ===
The Walpoles
Party	Candidate	Votes	%
Independent	K. Cousins	282	37.3
Independent	E. Kemp	251	33.2
Independent	E. Bettison	223	29.5
Majority		31	4.1
Turnout		756	45.8
Registered electors		1,649	
Independent win (new seat)			

=== Watlington ===
Watlington
Party	Candidate	Votes	%
Conservative	G. Garfoot	297	52.1
Independent	K. Brown	273	47.9
Majority		24	4.2
Turnout		570	41.2
Registered electors		1,382	
Conservative win (new seat)			

=== West Walton ===
West Walton
Party	Candidate	Votes	%
Independent	F. Jude	286	66.2
Labour	F. Judd	146	33.8
Majority		140	32.4
Turnout		432	42.0
Registered electors		1,028	
Independent win (new seat)			

=== West Winch ===
West Winch
Party	Candidate	Votes	%
Independent	C. Fuller	336	43.1
Labour	G. Cook	226	29.0
Independent	H. Gurney	176	22.6
Independent	W. Price	41	5.3
Majority		110	14.1
Turnout		779	45.9
Registered electors		1,698	
Independent win (new seat)			

=== Wiggenhall ===
Wiggenhall
Party	Candidate	Votes	%
Conservative	J. Turrell	310	48.7
Labour	P. Davies	211	33.2
Independent	W. Turrell	115	18.1
Majority		99	15.5
Turnout		636	47.0
Registered electors		1,354	
Conservative win (new seat)			
