= 1987 King's Lynn and West Norfolk Borough Council election =

1987 English local election

1987 King's Lynn & West Norfolk Borough Council election
- 7 May 1987

All 60 seats to King's Lynn & West Norfolk Borough Council 31 seats needed for a majority

	First party	Second party
Party	Conservative	Labour
Seats won	46	11
Seat change	▲4	▼4
Popular vote	37,021	17,036
Percentage	52.5%	24.2%
Swing	▼0.9%	▼13.6%
	Third party	Fourth party
Party	Alliance	Independent
Seats won	2	1
Seat change	▲1	▼1
Popular vote	15,057	1,410
Percentage	21.4%	2.0%
Swing	▲16.5%	▼1.8%
- Winner of each seat at the 1987 King's Lynn & West Norfolk Borough Council election.
Control before election
Conservative
Control after election
Conservative

The 1987 King's Lynn & West Norfolk Borough Council election took place on 7 May 1987 to elect members of King's Lynn & West Norfolk Borough Council in Norfolk, England. This was on the same day as other local elections.

== Summary ==
=== Election result ===
1987 King's Lynn and West Norfolk Borough Council election
Party	Candidates	Seats	Gains	Losses	Net gain/loss	Seats %	Votes %	Votes	+/−
Conservative	52	46	6	2	▲4	76.7	52.5	37,021	–0.9
Labour	40	11	0	4	▼4	18.3	24.2	17,036	–13.6
Alliance	40	2	2	1	▲1	3.3	21.4	15,057	+16.5
Independent	4	1	0	1	▼1	1.7	2.0	1,410	–1.8

== Ward results ==
Incumbent councillors standing for re-election are marked with an asterisk (*). Changes in seats do not take into account by-elections or defections.

=== Airfield ===
Airfield (2 seats)
Party	Candidate	Votes	%	±%
Conservative	J. Bagge*	765	71.2	+1.6
Conservative	J. Bagge*	743	69.1	+1.9
Alliance	C. Dye	309	28.7	N/A
Turnout		~1,075	38.1	+0.1
Registered electors		2,821		
Conservative hold				
Conservative hold				

=== Burnham ===
Burnham
Party	Candidate	Votes	%	±%
Conservative	E. Coke*	572	66.4	+6.0
Alliance	J. Bruce	201	23.3	+11.0
Labour	J. Rosser	88	10.2	–17.1
Majority		371	43.1	+5.3
Turnout		861	63.4	–4.0
Registered electors		1,359		
Conservative hold		Swing	▼2.5	

=== Chase ===
Chase (2 seats)
Party	Candidate	Votes	%	±%
Conservative	B. Barton*	656	44.6	–0.1
Conservative	E. Nockolds	645	43.8	+5.4
Alliance	R. Leeder	501	34.0	+16.0
Alliance	P. Portsmouth	467	31.7	N/A
Labour	G. Shelton	314	21.3	–11.0
Labour	L. Watts	283	19.2	–12.8
Turnout		~1,472	45.9	+0.8
Registered electors		3,207		
Conservative hold				
Conservative hold				

=== Clenchwarton ===
Clenchwarton
Party	Candidate	Votes	%	±%
Conservative	N. Lane*	683	75.6	+21.2
Alliance	G. Fredericks	221	24.4	N/A
Majority		462	51.2	+42.4
Turnout		904	52.0	–4.2
Registered electors		1,738		
Conservative hold				

=== Creake ===
Creake
Party	Candidate	Votes	%	±%
Conservative	M. Horsbrugh	456	46.2	+1.2
Labour	R. Vallance*	347	35.2	–19.8
Alliance	J. Gough	184	18.6	N/A
Majority		109	11.0	N/A
Turnout		987	67.5	+6.5
Registered electors		1,462		
Conservative gain from Labour		Swing	▲10.5	

=== Denton ===
Denton (3 seats)
Party	Candidate	Votes	%	±%
Conservative	M. Storey	1,211	66.5	+7.4
Conservative	C. Sharp*	1,134	62.3	+12.1
Conservative	A. White*	958	52.6	+6.0
Labour	S. Bunten	609	33.5	–7.6
Turnout		~1,820	43.9	+2.8
Registered electors		4,146		
Conservative hold				
Conservative hold				
Conservative hold				

=== Denver ===
Denver
Party	Candidate	Votes	%	±%
Conservative	D. Heal	Unopposed		
Registered electors		1,331		
Conservative gain from Independent				

=== Dersingham ===
Dersingham (2 seats)
Party	Candidate	Votes	%	±%
Conservative	R. Hipkin	1,250	55.5	+10.4
Conservative	I. Stockwell*	1,191	52.9	+18.6
Alliance	A. Evans	1,001	44.5	N/A
Alliance	J. Evans	967	43.0	N/A
Turnout		~2,250	59.4	–6.2
Registered electors		3,787		
Conservative hold				
Conservative hold				

=== Docking ===
Docking
Party	Candidate	Votes	%	±%
Labour	M. Howard*	339	42.0	–19.0
Conservative	S. Bett	309	38.2	+8.7
Independent	D. Jones	92	11.4	N/A
Alliance	B. Simmons	68	8.4	–1.1
Majority		30	3.7	–27.8
Turnout		808	56.5	+0.4
Registered electors		1,430		
Labour hold		Swing	▼13.9	

=== Downham Market ===
Downham Market (3 seats)
Party	Candidate	Votes	%	±%
Conservative	H. Rose*	1,430	41.7	–7.2
Conservative	L. Brown*	1,418	41.4	–5.3
Conservative	H. Blakey*	1,073	31.3	–3.0
Independent	T. Taylor	1,031	30.1	–2.0
Labour	G. Howells	516	15.1	–3.8
Labour	M. Stewart	495	14.4	–3.3
Alliance	R. Frost	449	13.1	N/A
Labour	T. Mansfield	377	11.0	N/A
Turnout		~3,427	63.0	+9.1
Registered electors		5,439		
Conservative hold				
Conservative hold				
Conservative hold				

=== Emneth ===
Emneth
Party	Candidate	Votes	%	±%
Independent	N. Terrington*	Unopposed		
Registered electors		1,606		
Independent hold				

=== Gayton ===
Gayton
Party	Candidate	Votes	%	±%
Conservative	I. Major*	561	67.3	+7.2
Alliance	D. Cann	273	32.7	+17.7
Majority		288	34.5	–0.7
Turnout		834	53.8	–1.7
Registered electors		1,549		
Conservative hold		Swing	▼5.3	

=== Gaywood Central ===
Gaywood Central (2 seats)
Party	Candidate	Votes	%	±%
Alliance	J. Loveless	771	45.0	+16.6
Alliance	G. Cosson	719	42.0	+20.7
Conservative	A. Haigh	671	39.2	–9.4
Conservative	B. Rawlinson	566	33.0	–14.3
Labour	D. McGivern	271	15.8	–7.2
Turnout		~1,713	56.5	+7.7
Registered electors		3,031		
Alliance gain from Conservative				
Alliance gain from Conservative				

=== Gaywood North ===
Gaywood North (3 seats)
Party	Candidate	Votes	%	±%
Conservative	D. Garwood*	1,062	45.6	–13.6
Conservative	L. Daubney*	1,042	44.7	–12.1
Conservative	T. Mickleburgh	961	41.2	–14.5
Alliance	S. Davies	748	32.1	N/A
Alliance	Y. Graham	683	29.3	N/A
Alliance	J. Rye	604	25.9	N/A
Labour	A. McGivern	522	22.4	–18.2
Labour	V. Seaman	518	22.2	–17.4
Labour	E. Howard	501	21.5	–16.8
Turnout		~2,331	51.8	+12.8
Registered electors		4,500		
Conservative hold				
Conservative hold				
Conservative hold				

=== Gaywood South ===
Gaywood South (3 seats)
Party	Candidate	Votes	%	±%
Labour	A. Burch*	1,226	52.7	–18.8
Labour	B. Burch	1,177	50.6	–20.7
Labour	M. Wilkinson*	1,140	49.0	–22.2
Conservative	J. Bacon	575	24.7	–3.5
Alliance	T. Manning	527	22.6	N/A
Turnout		~2,328	45.8	+8.1
Registered electors		5,080		
Labour hold				
Labour hold				
Labour hold				

=== Grimston ===
Grimston
Party	Candidate	Votes	%	±%
Conservative	K. Roberts	597	51.4	–0.3
Alliance	S. Goldsmith	564	48.6	+22.7
Majority		33	2.8	–23.0
Turnout		1,161	55.7	+4.0
Registered electors		2,083		
Conservative hold		Swing	▼11.5	

=== Heacham ===
Heacham (2 seats)
Party	Candidate	Votes	%	±%
Conservative	V. Stapley*	1,164	51.1	–3.0
Conservative	E. Gidney*	1,096	48.1	–4.8
Alliance	J. Wright	637	28.0	+9.7
Labour	S. Wilce	477	20.9	–6.6
Turnout		~2,278	58.8	+9.4
Registered electors		3,876		
Conservative hold				
Conservative hold				

=== Hunstanton ===
Hunstanton (2 seats)
Party	Candidate	Votes	%	±%
Conservative	C. Matkin*	1,196	58.0	–7.8
Conservative	M. Wood	1,094	53.1	–10.8
Labour	B. Devlin	547	26.5	–7.7
Labour	W. Watson	418	20.2	–6.3
Alliance	T. Hyde-Smith	320	15.5	N/A
Turnout		~2,063	52.0	+7.4
Registered electors		3,965		
Conservative hold				
Conservative hold				

=== Lynn Central ===
Lynn Central (2 seats)
Party	Candidate	Votes	%	±%
Conservative	J. Cook*	515	48.9	–1.3
Conservative	J. Mickleburgh	428	40.7	–5.2
Labour	L. Bunn	337	32.0	–17.7
Labour	L. Wilkinson	288	27.3	–13.1
Alliance	B. Howling	201	19.1	N/A
Alliance	J. Edmonds	195	18.5	N/A
Turnout		~1,053	47.6	+8.9
Registered electors		2,212		
Conservative hold				
Conservative gain from Labour				

=== Lynn North ===
Lynn North (2 seats)
Party	Candidate	Votes	%	±%
Labour	F. Juniper*	758	63.3	–14.7
Labour	G. Defty*	723	60.4	–12.5
Conservative	F. Roberts	226	18.9	–2.9
Alliance	S. Brockwell	214	17.9	N/A
Turnout		~1,196	38.9	–0.4
Registered electors		3,079		
Labour hold				
Labour hold				

=== Lynn South West ===
Lynn South West (2 seats)
Party	Candidate	Votes	%	±%
Labour	D. Benefer*	761	52.2	–4.0
Labour	P. Griggs	675	46.3	–8.2
Alliance	K. Leeder	371	25.5	+6.4
Conservative	C. Mahoney	325	22.3	–2.6
Alliance	D. Monk	314	21.6	N/A
Conservative	T. Savage	278	19.1	–3.2
Turnout		~1,459	43.1	
Registered electors		3,384		
Labour hold				
Labour hold				

=== Mershe Lande ===
Mershe Lande
Party	Candidate	Votes	%	±%
Conservative	H. Goose*	574	75.0	N/A
Alliance	C. Whittaker	97	12.7	N/A
Labour	J. Bantoft	94	12.3	N/A
Majority		477	62.4	N/A
Turnout		765	43.9	N/A
Registered electors		1,743		
Conservative hold				

=== Middleton ===
Middleton
Party	Candidate	Votes	%	±%
Conservative	J. Dodds	500	58.8	–9.8
Labour	J. Watson	211	24.8	–6.6
Alliance	P. Manning	139	16.4	N/A
Majority		289	34.0	–3.2
Turnout		850	53.3	+2.8
Registered electors		1,595		
Conservative hold		Swing	▼1.6	

=== North Coast ===
North Coast
Party	Candidate	Votes	%	±%
Conservative	R. Gibbs*	733	70.1	–6.0
Labour	M. Vallance	163	15.6	–8.3
Alliance	L. Lees	150	14.3	N/A
Majority		570	54.5	+2.3
Turnout		1,046	54.5	+6.8
Registered electors		1,919		
Conservative hold		Swing	▲1.2	

=== Priory ===
Priory
Party	Candidate	Votes	%	±%
Conservative	N. Olesen	330	48.9	+24.0
Labour	P. Clarke	269	39.9	–23.7
Alliance	L. Everett	76	11.3	N/A
Majority		61	9.0	N/A
Turnout		675	56.1	–4.2
Registered electors		1,204		
Conservative gain from Labour		Swing	▲23.9	

=== Rudham ===
Rudham
Party	Candidate	Votes	%	±%
Labour	B. Seaman*	369	57.3	–5.3
Conservative	R. Fraulo	197	30.6	–6.8
Alliance	I. Overton	78	12.1	N/A
Majority		172	26.7	+1.5
Turnout		644	60.1	+2.5
Registered electors		1,072		
Labour hold		Swing	▲0.8	

=== Snettisham ===
Snettisham
Party	Candidate	Votes	%	±%
Conservative	A. Massen	594	56.3	–1.1
Labour	M. Wilson	273	25.9	–16.7
Alliance	S. Taylor	188	17.8	N/A
Majority		321	30.4	+15.6
Turnout		1,055	54.4	+10.9
Registered electors		1,939		
Conservative hold		Swing	▲7.8	

=== Spellowfields ===
Spellowfields (2 seats)
Party	Candidate	Votes	%	±%
Conservative	B. Howling*	774	64.2	+7.2
Conservative	J. Wright*	719	59.6	+5.2
Alliance	J. Monk	431	35.8	N/A
Turnout		~1,205	37.7	–1.4
Registered electors		3,200		
Conservative hold				
Conservative hold				

=== St. Lawrence ===
St. Lawrence
Party	Candidate	Votes	%	±%
Conservative	W. Garner*	480	55.6	+5.1
Labour	L. Hall	243	28.2	–10.0
Alliance	T. Banks	140	16.2	+4.7
Majority		237	27.5	+15.1
Turnout		863	52.4	+5.3
Registered electors		1,647		
Conservative hold		Swing	▲7.8	

=== St. Margarets ===
St. Margarets
Party	Candidate	Votes	%	±%
Conservative	J. Buckley	383	44.7	+15.1
Labour	C. Heron*	343	40.1	+0.1
Alliance	R. Gregory	130	15.2	–15.1
Majority		40	4.7	N/A
Turnout		856	51.2	–3.5
Registered electors		1,671		
Conservative gain from Labour		Swing	▲7.5	

=== Ten Mile ===
Ten Mile
Party	Candidate	Votes	%	±%
Labour	J. Simper*	Unopposed		
Registered electors		1,801		
Labour hold				

=== The Walpoles ===
The Walpoles
Party	Candidate	Votes	%	±%
Conservative	E. Kemp*	492	68.3	N/A
Alliance	R. Blunt	149	20.7	N/A
Labour	M. Cross	79	11.0	N/A
Majority		343	47.6	N/A
Turnout		720	37.2	N/A
Registered electors		1,934		
Conservative hold				

=== The Woottons ===
The Woottons (2 seats)
Party	Candidate	Votes	%	±%
Conservative	L. Dutton*	1,464	53.9	–16.0
Conservative	R. Spencer*	1,424	52.4	–16.7
Alliance	J. Pearce	985	36.3	N/A
Alliance	D. Price	896	33.0	N/A
Labour	A. Cook	265	9.8	–20.2
Labour	J. Bellfield	231	8.5	–19.4
Turnout		~2,713	64.1	+13.1
Registered electors		4,231		
Conservative hold				
Conservative hold				

=== Upwell, Outwell & Delph ===
Upwell, Outwell & Delph (2 seats)
Party	Candidate	Votes	%	±%
Conservative	J. Beckett	882	73.7	N/A
Conservative	W. Doy	776	64.8	N/A
Labour	R. Parnell	314	26.3	N/A
Turnout		~1,196	31.7	N/A
Registered electors		3,776		
Conservative hold				
Conservative hold				

=== Valley Hill ===
Valley Hill
Party	Candidate	Votes	%	±%
Labour	M. Tilbury*	524	50.0	–9.1
Conservative	G. Pratt	391	37.3	–3.6
Alliance	C. Culey	132	12.6	N/A
Majority		133	12.7	–5.5
Turnout		1,047	57.2	–7.3
Registered electors		1,832		
Labour hold		Swing	▼2.8	

=== Watlington ===
Watlington
Party	Candidate	Votes	%	±%
Conservative	N. Pond	Unopposed		
Registered electors		1,787		
Conservative hold				

=== West Walton ===
West Walton
Party	Candidate	Votes	%	±%
Independent	F. Jude*	287	53.8	N/A
Alliance	D. Whittaker	246	46.2	N/A
Majority		41	7.7	N/A
Turnout		533	47.4	N/A
Registered electors		1,124		
Independent hold				

=== West Winch ===
West Winch
Party	Candidate	Votes	%	±%
Conservative	G. Dawes	674	72.9	+15.3
Alliance	M. Luxton	251	27.1	+2.8
Majority		423	45.7	+12.4
Turnout		925	44.9	–4.6
Registered electors		2,058		
Conservative hold		Swing	▲6.3	

=== Wiggenhall ===
Wiggenhall
Party	Candidate	Votes	%	±%
Conservative	Y. Turrell*	473	65.8	+21.9
Labour	D. Asker	149	20.7	–17.4
Alliance	R. Tondeur	97	13.5	N/A
Majority		324	45.1	+39.3
Turnout		719	49.9	+2.3
Registered electors		1,441		
Conservative hold		Swing	▲19.7	

=== Wissey ===
Wissey
Party	Candidate	Votes	%	±%
Conservative	J. Cowleson	602	68.3	+18.7
Labour	R. Everitt	279	31.7	N/A
Majority		323	36.7	N/A
Turnout		881	48.4	–3.7
Registered electors		1,821		
Conservative gain from Alliance				
