= 1995 King's Lynn and West Norfolk Borough Council election =

1995 English local election

1995 King's Lynn & West Norfolk Borough Council election
- 4 May 1995

All 60 seats to King's Lynn & West Norfolk Borough Council 31 seats needed for a majority
- Registered: 108,392
- Turnout: ~36.5% (▼8.3%)

	First party	Second party	Third party
Party	Labour	Independent	Conservative
Seats won	37	10	7
Seat change	▲21	▲2	▼23
Popular vote	31,248	9,471	14,516
Percentage	49.0%	14.9%	22.8%
Swing	▲12.1%	▼1.9%	▼10.7%
	Fourth party	Fifth party
Party	Liberal Democrats	Ind. Conservative
Seats won	6	0
Seat change	▲1	▼1
Popular vote	8,247	289
Percentage	12.9%	0.5%
Swing	▼2.9%	N/A
- Winner of each seat at the 1995 King's Lynn & West Norfolk Borough Council election.
Control before election
No overall control
Control after election
Labour

The 1995 King's Lynn & West Norfolk Borough Council election took place on 4 May 1995 to elect members of King's Lynn & West Norfolk Borough Council in Norfolk, England. This was on the same day as other local elections.

== Summary ==
=== Election result ===
1995 King's Lynn & West Norfolk Borough Council election
Party	Candidates	Seats	Gains	Losses	Net gain/loss	Seats %	Votes %	Votes	+/−
Labour	60	37	21	0	▲21	61.7	49.0	31,248	+12.1
Independent	19	10	7	5	▲2	16.7	14.9	9,471	+1.9
Conservative	30	7	0	23	▼23	11.7	22.8	14,516	–10.7
Liberal Democrats	19	6	1	0	▲1	10.0	12.9	8,247	–2.9
Ind. Conservative	1	0	0	1	▼1	0.0	0.5	289	N/A

7 Labour candidates were elected unopposed.

== Ward results ==
Incumbent councillors standing for re-election are marked with an asterisk (*). Changes in seats do not take into account by-elections or defections.

=== Airfield ===
Airfield (2 seats)
Party	Candidate	Votes	%	±%
Labour	I. Macdonald	522	41.8	
Labour	R. Everitt	519	41.6	
Conservative	G. Hipperson	505	40.4	
Independent	J. Gooderson	491	39.3	
Liberal Democrats	M. Burrell	206	16.5	
Turnout		~1,249	45.1	
Registered electors		2,770		
Labour gain from Conservative				
Labour gain from Conservative				

=== Burnham ===
Burnham
Party	Candidate	Votes	%	±%
Independent	M. Gray	364	56.8	
Labour	J. Sheridan	277	43.2	
Majority		87	13.6	
Turnout		641	49.8	
Registered electors		1,286		
Independent gain from Conservative		Swing		

=== Chase ===
Chase (2 seats)
Party	Candidate	Votes	%	±%
Labour	E. Benefer*	965	78.1	
Labour	D. Berry*	923	74.7	
Conservative	I. Lockhart	212	17.2	
Turnout		~1,236	39.5	
Registered electors		3,130		
Labour hold				
Labour hold				

=== Clenchwarton ===
Clenchwarton
Party	Candidate	Votes	%	±%
Liberal Democrats	P. Brandon*	416	49.3	
Independent	R. Payn	258	30.6	
Labour	J. Hardy	169	20.0	
Majority		158	18.7	
Turnout		843	48.3	
Registered electors		1,746		
Liberal Democrats hold		Swing		

=== Creake ===
Creake
Party	Candidate	Votes	%	±%
Labour	K. O'Connor	415	51.8	
Conservative	M. Horsbrugh*	386	48.2	
Majority		29	3.6	
Turnout		801	56.9	
Registered electors		1,407		
Labour gain from Conservative		Swing		

=== Denton ===
Denton (3 seats)
Party	Candidate	Votes	%	±%
Conservative	M. Storey*	887	47.9	
Conservative	C. Sharp*	810	43.8	
Liberal Democrats	D. Buckton*	753	40.7	
Conservative	A. White	685	37.0	
Labour	K. Lansdown	593	32.1	
Labour	G. Mansfield	477	25.8	
Labour	W. Mansfield	431	23.3	
Turnout		~1,850	47.6	
Registered electors		3,887		
Conservative hold				
Conservative hold				
Liberal Democrats hold				

=== Denver ===
Denver
Party	Candidate	Votes	%	±%
Labour	R. Fairhead	190	41.7	
Conservative	R. Baker	176	38.6	
Liberal Democrats	C. Gandy	90	19.7	
Majority		14	3.1	
Turnout		456	41.7	
Registered electors		1,095		
Labour gain from Conservative		Swing		

=== Dersingham ===
Dersingham (2 seats)
Party	Candidate	Votes	%	±%
Liberal Democrats	P. Burall*	949	44.2	
Conservative	G. Pratt*	744	34.7	
Labour	S. Harmer	646	30.1	
Liberal Democrats	J. Hayward	611	28.5	
Conservative	J. Huggett	573	26.7	
Labour	C. Joyce	547	25.5	
Turnout		~2,145	51.9	
Registered electors		4,133		
Liberal Democrats hold				
Conservative hold				

=== Docking ===
Docking
Party	Candidate	Votes	%	±%
Labour	D. Ford*	Unopposed		
Registered electors		1,442		
Labour hold				

=== Downham Market ===
Downham Market (3 seats)
Party	Candidate	Votes	%	±%
Independent	T. Taylor*	1,097	42.4	
Independent	D. Forgan	1,033	39.9	
Conservative	J. Legg	1,009	39.0	
Labour	M. Stewart	998	38.6	
Labour	W. Scott	807	31.2	
Labour	J. Drinkwater	796	30.8	
Liberal Democrats	A. Kenedler	674	26.1	
Turnout		~2,587	42.6	
Registered electors		6,073		
Independent gain from Conservative				
Independent gain from Conservative				
Conservative hold				

=== Emneth ===
Emneth
Party	Candidate	Votes	%	±%
Labour	I. Harley	273	52.4	
Independent	N. Terrington*	248	47.6	
Majority		25	4.8	
Turnout		521	30.1	
Registered electors		1,737		
Labour gain from Ind. Conservative		Swing		

=== Gayton ===
Gayton
Party	Candidate	Votes	%	±%
Independent	I. Major*	405	50.8	
Labour	N. Townshend	393	49.2	
Majority		12	1.5	
Turnout		798	48.3	
Registered electors		1,651		
Independent gain from Conservative		Swing		

=== Gaywood Central ===
Gaywood Central (2 seats)
Party	Candidate	Votes	%	±%
Labour	J. Lee	633	44.1	
Labour	A. Luckett	611	42.5	
Liberal Democrats	J. Loveless	479	33.3	
Conservative	A. Haigh*	376	26.2	
Liberal Democrats	A. Bolton	351	24.4	
Conservative	P. Hollier	286	19.9	
Turnout		~1,437	44.3	
Registered electors		3,243		
Labour gain from Conservative				
Labour gain from Conservative				

=== Gaywood North ===
Gaywood North (3 seats)
Party	Candidate	Votes	%	±%
Labour	D. Collis	1,295	65.8	
Labour	C. Walters	1,253	63.7	
Labour	D. Drew	1,217	61.9	
Conservative	M. Langwade*	573	29.1	
Conservative	B. Watson	523	26.6	
Conservative	T. Mickleburgh*	491	25.0	
Turnout		~1,967	37.2	
Registered electors		5,288		
Labour gain from Independent				
Labour gain from Independent				
Labour gain from Independent				

=== Gaywood South ===
Gaywood South (3 seats)
Party	Candidate	Votes	%	±%
Labour	A. Burch*	Unopposed		
Labour	B. Burch*	Unopposed		
Labour	M. Wilkinson	Unopposed		
Registered electors		4,851		
Labour hold				
Labour hold				
Labour hold				

=== Grimston ===
Grimston
Party	Candidate	Votes	%	±%
Liberal Democrats	H. Fredericks*	405	38.4	
Conservative	T. Tilbrook	366	34.7	
Labour	P. Johnson	285	27.0	
Majority		39	3.7	
Turnout		1,056	50.0	
Registered electors		2,112		
Liberal Democrats hold		Swing		

=== Heacham ===
Heacham (2 seats)
Party	Candidate	Votes	%	±%
Labour	A. Evans*	1,249	62.4	
Labour	M. Liddington	1,061	53.0	
Conservative	P. Hammond*	744	37.2	
Conservative	A. Cargill	605	30.2	
Turnout		~2,001	47.4	
Registered electors		4,221		
Labour hold				
Labour gain from Conservative				

=== Hunstanton ===
Hunstanton (2 seats)
Party	Candidate	Votes	%	±%
Conservative	C. Matkin*	1,008	53.1	
Independent	M. Wood*	908	47.8	
Labour	P. Davison	819	43.2	
Labour	A. Smith	750	39.5	
Turnout		~1,898	45.0	
Registered electors		4,218		
Conservative hold				
Independent gain from Conservative				

=== Lynn Central ===
Lynn Central (2 seats)
Party	Candidate	Votes	%	±%
Labour	G. Defty	612	69.8	
Labour	J. Roper	559	63.7	
Independent	J. Cook*	283	32.3	
Turnout		~877	39.1	
Registered electors		2,244		
Labour gain from Conservative				
Labour gain from Conservative				

=== Lynn North ===
Lynn North (2 seats)
Party	Candidate	Votes	%	±%
Labour	L. Twell	Unopposed		
Labour	F. Juniper*	Unopposed		
Registered electors		2,621		
Labour hold				
Labour hold				

=== Lynn South West ===
Lynn South West (2 seats)
Party	Candidate	Votes	%	±%
Labour	D. Benefer*	846	69.3	
Labour	S. Connolly	719	58.9	
Conservative	C. Garrod	187	15.3	
Turnout		~1,021	39.0	
Registered electors		2,619		
Labour hold				
Labour hold				

=== Mershe Lande ===
Mershe Lande
Party	Candidate	Votes	%	±%
Labour	J. Bantoft	548	65.5	
Ind. Conservative	P. Pemberton	289	34.5	
Majority		259	30.9	
Turnout		837	46.2	
Registered electors		1,810		
Labour gain from Independent		Swing		

=== Middleton ===
Middleton
Party	Candidate	Votes	%	±%
Labour	E. Sheridan	413	59.1	
Independent	A. White*	286	40.9	
Majority		127	18.2	
Turnout		699	41.2	
Registered electors		1,702		
Labour gain from Conservative		Swing		

=== North Coast ===
North Coast
Party	Candidate	Votes	%	±%
Independent	S. Oliver*	486	56.7	
Labour	J. Mitchell	371	43.3	
Majority		115	13.4	
Turnout		857	44.5	
Registered electors		1,939		
Independent gain from Conservative		Swing		

=== Priory ===
Priory
Party	Candidate	Votes	%	±%
Labour	G. Shelton*	434	69.4	
Conservative	E. Nockolds	191	30.6	
Majority		243	38.9	
Turnout		625	53.0	
Registered electors		1,193		
Labour hold		Swing		

=== Rudham ===
Rudham
Party	Candidate	Votes	%	±%
Labour	B. Seaman*	444	77.9	
Independent	G. Sandell	126	22.1	
Majority		318	55.8	
Turnout		570	52.4	
Registered electors		1,087		
Labour hold		Swing		

=== Snettisham ===
Snettisham
Party	Candidate	Votes	%	±%
Labour	C. Ward	491	44.1	
Conservative	S. Massen	439	39.4	
Independent	M. Baker	184	16.5	
Majority		52	4.7	
Turnout		1,114	57.9	
Registered electors		1,923		
Labour gain from Independent		Swing		

=== Spellowfields ===
Spellowfields (2 seats)
Party	Candidate	Votes	%	±%
Liberal Democrats	M. Walker*	599	46.4	
Labour	M. Dungay	438	33.9	
Liberal Democrats	J. Fox	409	31.7	
Labour	A. Munden	403	31.2	
Independent	J. Howling*	372	28.8	
Turnout		~1,268	38.7	
Registered electors		3,278		
Liberal Democrats hold				
Labour gain from Conservative				

=== St. Lawrence ===
St. Lawrence
Party	Candidate	Votes	%	±%
Labour	P. Bantoft*	341	44.1	
Independent	W. Garner*	219	28.3	
Liberal Democrats	D. Parish	214	27.6	
Majority		122	15.8	
Turnout		774	45.4	
Registered electors		1,723		
Labour gain from Conservative		Swing		

=== St. Margarets ===
St. Margarets
Party	Candidate	Votes	%	±%
Labour	P. Richards*	621	84.5	
Conservative	B. Barton	114	15.5	
Majority		507	69.0	
Turnout		735	47.6	
Registered electors		1,543		
Labour hold		Swing		

=== Ten Mile ===
Ten Mile
Party	Candidate	Votes	%	±%
Labour	J. Simper*	443	72.7	
Conservative	K. Mason	166	27.3	
Majority		277	45.5	
Turnout		609	35.3	
Registered electors		1,737		
Labour hold		Swing		

=== The Walpoles ===
The Walpoles
Party	Candidate	Votes	%	±%
Labour	G. Stow	341	41.3	
Liberal Democrats	S. Clery-Fox	249	30.2	
Conservative	D. Read	235	28.5	
Majority		92	11.2	
Turnout		825	38.9	
Registered electors		2,125		
Labour gain from Conservative		Swing		

=== The Woottons ===
The Woottons (2 seats)
Party	Candidate	Votes	%	±%
Independent	L. Dutton*	900	40.9	
Independent	R. Spencer*	819	37.3	
Labour	J. Kernohan	763	34.7	
Labour	A. Williams	724	32.9	
Liberal Democrats	D. Oldfield	536	24.4	
Liberal Democrats	N. Kulkarni	435	19.8	
Turnout		~2,208	45.0	
Registered electors		4,905		
Independent gain from Conservative				
Independent gain from Conservative				

=== Upwell, Outwell & Delph ===
Upwell, Outwell & Delph (2 seats)
Party	Candidate	Votes	%	±%
Conservative	J. Beckett*	837	35.8	
Independent	A. Feary*	655	28.0	
Labour	R. Parnell	546	23.4	
Labour	T. Winterton	432	18.5	
Liberal Democrats	J. Marsh	300	12.8	
Turnout		~1,602	38.3	
Registered electors		4,184		
Conservative hold				
Independent hold				

=== Valley Hill ===
Valley Hill
Party	Candidate	Votes	%	±%
Labour	J. Tilbury*	Unopposed		
Registered electors		1,877		
Labour hold				

=== Watlington ===
Watlington
Party	Candidate	Votes	%	±%
Conservative	N. Pond*	391	42.9	
Labour	J. Macdonald	335	36.7	
Liberal Democrats	A. Penny	186	20.4	
Majority		56	6.1	
Turnout		912	41.9	
Registered electors		2,180		
Conservative hold		Swing		

=== West Walton ===
West Walton
Party	Candidate	Votes	%	±%
Independent	R. Groom*	337	74.9	
Labour	G. Wright	113	25.1	
Majority		224	49.8	
Turnout		450	39.8	
Registered electors		1,132		
Independent gain from Conservative		Swing		

=== West Winch ===
West Winch
Party	Candidate	Votes	%	±%
Labour	W. Hollyer	548	57.7	
Conservative	G. Dawes*	401	42.3	
Majority		147	15.5	
Turnout		949	43.1	
Registered electors		2,213		
Labour gain from Conservative		Swing		

=== Wiggenhall ===
Wiggenhall
Party	Candidate	Votes	%	±%
Labour	L. Wilkinson	420	59.2	
Conservative	Y. Turrell*	290	40.8	
Majority		130	18.4	
Turnout		710	48.9	
Registered electors		1,451		
Labour gain from Conservative		Swing		

=== Wissey ===
Wissey
Party	Candidate	Votes	%	±%
Liberal Democrats	I. Mack	385	41.8	
Conservative	T. Manley*	306	33.3	
Labour	P. Kellingray	229	24.9	
Majority		79	8.5	
Turnout		920	50.6	
Registered electors		1,823		
Liberal Democrats gain from Conservative		Swing		
