= 2003 King's Lynn and West Norfolk Borough Council election =

2003 English local election

2003 King's Lynn & West Norfolk Borough Council election
- 1 May 2003

All 62 seats to King's Lynn & West Norfolk Borough Council 31 seats needed for a majority
- Registered: 108,707
- Turnout: ~46.8% (▲14.7%)

	First party	Second party
Party	Conservative	Labour
Seats won	35	14
Seat change	▲9	▼13
Popular vote	40,443	19,963
Percentage	50.4%	24.9%
Swing	▲4.2%	▼15.0%
	Third party	Fourth party
Party	Liberal Democrats	Independent
Seats won	7	6
Seat change	▲2	▲4
Popular vote	10,875	9,025
Percentage	13.5%	11.2%
Swing	▲2.6%	▲8.2%
Control before election
No overall control
Control after election
Conservative

The 2003 King's Lynn & West Norfolk Borough Council election took place on 1 May 2003 to elect members of King's Lynn & West Norfolk Borough Council in Norfolk, England. This was on the same day as other local elections.

The whole council was up for election on new ward boundaries. This increased the number of seats by 2 from 60 to 62.

== Summary ==
=== Election result ===
2003 King's Lynn & West Norfolk Borough Council election
Party	Candidates	Seats	Gains	Losses	Net gain/loss	Seats %	Votes %	Votes	+/−
Conservative	60	35	N/A	N/A	▲9	56.5	50.4	40,443	+4.2
Labour	36	14	N/A	N/A	▼13	22.6	24.9	19,963	–15.0
Liberal Democrats	20	7	N/A	N/A	▲2	11.3	13.5	10,875	+2.6
Independent	13	6	N/A	N/A	▲4	9.7	11.2	9,025	+8.2

== Ward results ==
Incumbent councillors standing for re-election are marked with an asterisk (*). Changes in seats do not take into account by-elections or defections.

=== Airfield ===
Airfield (2 seats)
Party	Candidate	Votes	%	±%
Conservative	Geoffrey Hipperson*	958	63.5	
Conservative	Hugh Symington	847	56.2	
Labour	Phillip Wing	442	29.3	
Liberal Democrats	Matthew Farthing	334	22.1	
Turnout		~1,508	45.3	
Registered electors		3,328		
Conservative hold				
Conservative gain from Labour				

=== Brancaster ===
Brancaster
Party	Candidate	Votes	%
Conservative	Anthony Dobson*	684	69.7
Liberal Democrats	Jason Borthwick	298	30.3
Majority		386	39.4
Turnout		982	55.2
Registered electors		1,785	
Conservative win (new seat)			

=== Burnham ===
Burnham
Party	Candidate	Votes	%	±%
Conservative	Garry Sandell*	700	72.2	
Liberal Democrats	Richard Mills	270	27.8	
Majority		430	44.3	
Turnout		970	57.5	
Registered electors		1,694		
Conservative hold		Swing		

=== Clenchwarton ===
Clenchwarton
Party	Candidate	Votes	%	±%
Liberal Democrats	Paul Brandon*	627	60.9	
Conservative	David Whitby	403	39.1	
Majority		224	21.8	
Turnout		1,030	59.2	
Registered electors		1,766		
Liberal Democrats hold		Swing		

=== Denton ===
Denton (3 seats)
Party	Candidate	Votes	%	±%
Conservative	Martin Storey*	1,336	68.8	
Conservative	Carol Sharp*	1,300	67.0	
Conservative	Michael Peake*	1,221	62.9	
Liberal Democrats	Nicole Farthing	524	27.0	
Turnout		~1,941	37.7	
Registered electors		5,149		
Conservative hold				
Conservative hold				
Conservative hold				

=== Dersingham ===
Dersingham (2 seats)
Party	Candidate	Votes	%	±%
Liberal Democrats	Paul Burall*	1,564	69.6	
Liberal Democrats	Colin Smith	1,231	54.8	
Conservative	George Pratt*	866	38.5	
Conservative	Sheila Tweedy-Smith	533	23.7	
Turnout		~2,248	57.1	
Registered electors		3,937		
Liberal Democrats hold				
Liberal Democrats gain from Conservative				

=== Docking ===
Docking
Party	Candidate	Votes	%	±%
Conservative	Nicholas Ullswater	536	54.8	
Labour	Keith Ives*	322	32.9	
Independent	Matthew Falkner	120	12.3	
Majority		214	21.9	
Turnout		978	58.1	
Registered electors		1,687		
Conservative gain from Labour		Swing		

=== Downham Old Town ===
Downham Old Town
Party	Candidate	Votes	%
Conservative	Kathleen Mellish	355	56.6
Independent	Jenny Groom	272	43.4
Majority		83	13.2
Turnout		627	41.2
Registered electors		1,529	
Conservative win (new seat)			

=== East Downham ===
East Downham
Party	Candidate	Votes	%
Conservative	Anthony Lovett*	451	67.4
Labour	Linda Keer	218	32.6
Majority		233	34.8
Turnout		669	48.1
Registered electors		1,416	
Conservative win (new seat)			

=== Emneth with Outwell ===
Emneth with Outwell (2 seats)
Party	Candidate	Votes	%
Conservative	Barry Archer	966	66.0
Conservative	Harry Humphrey*	934	63.8
Labour	Roger Parnell	435	29.7
Turnout		~1,464	41.9
Registered electors		3,494	
Conservative win (new seat)			
Conservative win (new seat)			

=== Fairstead ===
Fairstead (2 seats)
Party	Candidate	Votes	%
Labour	Margaret Wilkinson*	680	55.3
Labour	Ian Gourlay	595	48.4
Conservative	Joanna Moncrieff	455	37.0
Turnout		~1,229	33.8
Registered electors		3,636	
Labour win (new seat)			
Labour win (new seat)			

=== Gayton ===
Gayton
Party	Candidate	Votes	%	±%
Conservative	Peter Gidney	534	56.0	
Liberal Democrats	David Parish	421	44.1	
Majority		113	11.9	
Turnout		955	54.7	
Registered electors		1,750		
Conservative hold		Swing		

=== Gaywood Chase ===
Gaywood Chase (2 seats)
Party	Candidate	Votes	%
Labour	Brenda Burch*	786	55.6
Labour	Alan Burch*	755	53.4
Conservative	Jacqueline Candy	587	41.6
Conservative	Mark Lapping	503	35.6
Turnout		~1,413	38.8
Registered electors		3,641	
Labour win (new seat)			
Labour win (new seat)			

=== Gaywood North Bank ===
Gaywood North Bank (3 seats)
Party	Candidate	Votes	%
Conservative	Mark Shorting	1,175	51.4
Conservative	Michael Langwade	1,141	49.8
Labour	Christopher Bunting	1,009	44.1
Labour	David Collis*	985	43.0
Conservative	Alastair Moncrieff	954	41.7
Labour	Clifford Walters*	926	40.5
Turnout		~2,289	40.0
Registered electors		5,723	
Conservative win (new seat)			
Conservative win (new seat)			
Labour win (new seat)			

=== Grimston ===
Grimston
Party	Candidate	Votes	%	±%
Liberal Democrats	Hazel Fredericks*	726	69.5	
Conservative	Kenneth Roberts	318	30.5	
Majority		408	39.0	
Turnout		1,044	54.3	
Registered electors		1,940		
Liberal Democrats hold		Swing		

=== Heacham ===
Heacham (2 seats)
Party	Candidate	Votes	%	±%
Independent	Julian Witton	1,379	61.0	
Independent	Paul Cobb*	1,365	60.3	
Conservative	Edward Martin	474	21.0	
Labour	Barry Diggle	421	18.6	
Labour	Joan Diggle	387	17.1	
Conservative	Frank Lewis	379	16.8	
Turnout		~2,262	54.8	
Registered electors		4,128		
Independent gain from Labour				
Independent gain from Labour				

=== Hilgay with Denver ===
Hilgay with Denver
Party	Candidate	Votes	%
Conservative	Anthony White*	516	66.7
Labour	Thomas Thompson	258	33.3
Majority		258	33.4
Turnout		774	43.5
Registered electors		1,789	
Conservative win (new seat)			

=== Hunstanton ===
Hunstanton (3 seats)
Party	Candidate	Votes	%	±%
Conservative	Bryan Bullivant	1,371	51.6	
Conservative	Alan Booth	1,110	41.8	
Conservative	Myrtle Wood*	1,069	40.2	
Labour	Stuart Bagnall	1,020	38.4	
Independent	Chistopher Nicholls	933	35.1	
Labour	Brian Devlin	841	31.6	
Labour	Richard Bird	725	27.3	
Turnout		~2,658	54.4	
Registered electors		4,886		
Conservative hold				
Conservative hold				
Conservative win (new seat)				

=== Mershe Lande ===
Mershe Lande
Party	Candidate	Votes	%	±%
Labour	Jack Bantoft*	540	57.3	
Conservative	Gordon Dawes	402	42.7	
Majority		138	14.6	
Turnout		942	49.5	
Registered electors		1,911		
Labour hold		Swing		

=== North Downham ===
North Downham
Party	Candidate	Votes	%
Conservative	Geoffrey Wareham	500	68.1
Labour	Nigel Canham	234	31.9
Majority		266	36.2
Turnout		734	54.8
Registered electors		1,354	
Conservative win (new seat)			

=== North Lynn ===
North Lynn (2 seats)
Party	Candidate	Votes	%	±%
Labour	Linda Poll*	894	63.3	
Labour	Andrew Tyler*	876	62.0	
Conservative	Benjamin Perry	380	26.9	
Conservative	Chloe Dinwi1y	344	24.4	
Turnout		~1,412	36.7	
Registered electors		3,847		
Labour hold				
Labour hold				

=== North Wootton ===
North Wootton
Party	Candidate	Votes	%
Conservative	Greville Howard	533	56.3
Liberal Democrats	Kate Sayer	413	43.7
Majority		120	12.6
Turnout		946	51.7
Registered electors		1,854	
Conservative win (new seat)			

=== Old Gaywood ===
Old Gaywood
Party	Candidate	Votes	%
Labour	John Collop*	381	54.7
Conservative	Daryle Taylor	315	45.3
Majority		66	9.4
Turnout		696	45.9
Registered electors		1,521	
Labour win (new seat)			

=== Priory ===
Priory
Party	Candidate	Votes	%	±%
Labour	Gwyneth Thorneywork	488	54.9	
Conservative	John Turtle	401	45.1	
Majority		87	9.8	
Turnout		889	47.5	
Registered electors		1,891		
Labour hold		Swing		

=== Rudham ===
Rudham
Party	Candidate	Votes	%	±%
Conservative	Barry Ayres	592	62.6	
Labour	Vernon Moyse	353	37.4	
Majority		239	25.2	
Turnout		945	50.0	
Registered electors		1,899		
Conservative gain from Labour		Swing		

=== Snettisham ===
Snettisham (2 seats)
Party	Candidate	Votes	%	±%
Independent	David Johnson	1,217	64.4	
Independent	Carol Tilbury*	887	46.9	
Conservative	Anthony Powell	605	32.0	
Conservative	Emma Rye	549	29.1	
Labour	Clive Jones	296	15.7	
Turnout		~1,889	56.7	
Registered electors		3,331		
Independent gain from Labour				
Independent win (new seat)				

=== South & West Lynn ===
South & West Lynn (2 seats)
Party	Candidate	Votes	%
Labour	Charles Joyce*	629	50.8
Conservative	Geoffrey Daniell	578	46.6
Labour	Irene MacDonald*	557	45.0
Conservative	Peter Lagoda	546	44.1
Turnout		~1,239	42.6
Registered electors		2,909	
Labour win (new seat)			
Conservative win (new seat)			

=== South Downham ===
South Downham
Party	Candidate	Votes	%
Conservative	John Legg*	Unopposed	
Registered electors		1,639	
Conservative win (new seat)			

=== South Wootton ===
South Wootton (2 seats)
Party	Candidate	Votes	%
Conservative	Elizabeth Nockolds*	1,303	68.0
Conservative	Nicholas Daubney*	1,210	63.1
Labour	Vernon Moyse	517	27.0
Liberal Democrats	Alison Loades	412	21.5
Turnout		~1,917	56.4
Registered electors		3,399	
Conservative win (new seat)			
Conservative win (new seat)			

=== Spellowfields ===
Spellowfields (2 seats)
Party	Candidate	Votes	%	±%
Conservative	David Harwood*	1,017	63.2	
Conservative	Brian Long	834	51.9	
Labour	Veronica Cook	674	41.9	
Labour	Dawn Everitt	461	28.7	
Turnout		~1,608	45.0	
Registered electors		3,574		
Conservative hold				
Conservative hold				

=== Springwood ===
Springwood
Party	Candidate	Votes	%
Liberal Democrats	John Loveless*	422	51.2
Conservative	Michael Buckley	284	34.5
Independent	Ann Bolton	112	13.6
Majority		138	16.7
Turnout		818	50.3
Registered electors		1,638	
Liberal Democrats win (new seat)			

=== St. Lawrence ===
St. Lawrence
Party	Candidate	Votes	%	±%
Conservative	Barry Ayres	526	55.4	
Labour	Pauline Bantoft*	423	44.6	
Majority		103	10.8	
Turnout		949	50.7	
Registered electors		1,880		
Conservative gain from Labour		Swing		

=== St. Margarets with St Nicholas ===
St. Margarets with St Nicholas (2 seats)
Party	Candidate	Votes	%
Labour	Ted Benefer*	535	38.6
Labour	David Berry*	523	37.7
Conservative	Lesley Bambridge	446	32.2
Conservative	Timothy Boldero	378	27.2
Liberal Democrats	Mark Seaman	374	27.0
Liberal Democrats	Teresa Brandon	358	25.8
Turnout		~1,387	43.0
Registered electors		3,225	
Labour win (new seat)			
Labour win (new seat)			

=== Upwell & Delph ===
Upwell & Delph (2 seats)
Party	Candidate	Votes	%
Conservative	Vivienne Spikings*	1,003	65.3
Conservative	David Pope	871	56.7
Independent	David Barnard*	624	40.7
Independent	William Haylock	343	22.3
Turnout		~1,535	44.5
Registered electors		3,452	
Conservative win (new seat)			
Conservative win (new seat)			

=== Valley Hill ===
Valley Hill
Party	Candidate	Votes	%	±%
Independent	John Tilbury*	701	61.4	
Conservative	Zipha Cristopher	344	30.1	
Labour	Jennifer Koch	97	8.5	
Majority		357	31.3	
Turnout		1,142	63.0	
Registered electors		1,820		
Independent gain from Labour		Swing		

=== Walpole ===
Walpole
Party	Candidate	Votes	%
Liberal Democrats	Ann Clery-Fox	492	66.0
Conservative	Christine Rye	254	34.0
Majority		238	32.0
Turnout		746	44.8
Registered electors		1,679	
Liberal Democrats win (new seat)			

=== Walton ===
Walton
Party	Candidate	Votes	%
Independent	Roy Groom*	778	87.8
Liberal Democrats	Florence James	108	12.2
Majority		670	75.6
Turnout		886	44.9
Registered electors		1,974	
Independent win (new seat)			

=== Watlington ===
Watlington
Party	Candidate	Votes	%	±%
Conservative	Julyan Ansell*	501	72.2	
Liberal Democrats	Derek Neve	193	27.8	
Majority		308	44.4	
Turnout		694	42.7	
Registered electors		1,641		
Conservative hold		Swing		

=== West Winch ===
West Winch (2 seats)
Party	Candidate	Votes	%	±%
Liberal Democrats	Judith Brown*	1,007	52.4	
Conservative	David Rye	1,003	52.2	
Conservative	Jean Mickleburgh*	881	45.8	
Liberal Democrats	Colin Sayer	655	34.1	
Turnout		~1,922	50.8	
Registered electors		3,783		
Liberal Democrats hold				
Conservative win (new seat)				

=== Wiggenhall ===
Wiggenhall
Party	Candidate	Votes	%	±%
Labour	Lawrence Wilkinson*	428	54.2	
Conservative	Paul Foster	361	45.8	
Majority		67	8.4	
Turnout		789	51.1	
Registered electors		1,560		
Labour hold		Swing		

=== Wimbotsham with Fincham ===
Wimbotsham with Fincham
Party	Candidate	Votes	%
Conservative	Margaret Moir	350	39.1
Independent	John Bostock	294	32.8
Labour	Paula Killingray	252	28.1
Majority		56	6.3
Turnout		896	47.0
Registered electors		1,909	
Conservative win (new seat)			

=== Wissey ===
Wissey
Party	Candidate	Votes	%	±%
Conservative	Trevor Manley*	456	50.6	
Liberal Democrats	Paul Coulten	446	49.4	
Majority		10	1.2	
Turnout		902	52.4	
Registered electors		1,739		
Conservative hold		Swing		
