= 1976 West Norfolk District Council election =

1976 English local election

- 6 May 1976

All 60 seats to West Norfolk District Council 31 seats needed for a majority
- Registered: 71,550
- Turnout: ~40.3% (▼3.2%)

	First party	Second party
Party	Conservative	Labour
Seats won	37	13
Seat change	▲23	▼9
Popular vote	30,137	24,530
Percentage	47.3%	38.5%
Swing	▲17.7%	▼2.6%
	Third party	Fourth party
Party	Independent	Ind. Conservative
Seats won	7	3
Seat change	▼12	▼2
Popular vote	6,557	1,944
Percentage	10.3%	3.0%
Swing	▼11.5%	▲0.2%
Control before election
No overall control
Control after election
Conservative

The 1976 West Norfolk District Council election took place on 6 May 1976 to elect members of West Norfolk District Council in Norfolk, England. This was on the same day as other local elections.

== Summary ==
=== Election result ===
1976 West Norfolk District Council election
Party	Candidates	Seats	Gains	Losses	Net gain/loss	Seats %	Votes %	Votes	+/−
Conservative	44	37	19	1	▲23	61.7	47.3	30,137	+17.7
Labour	45	13	1	9	▼9	21.7	38.5	24,530	–2.6
Independent	18	7	2	10	▼12	11.7	10.3	6,557	–11.5
Ind. Conservative	6	3	1	3	▼2	5.0	3.0	1,944	+0.2
Liberal	3	0	0	0	Steady	0.0	0.8	489	–3.9
National Front	1	0	0	0	Steady	0.0	0.2	110	N/A

== Ward results ==
Incumbent councillors standing for re-election are marked with an asterisk (*). Changes in seats do not take into account by-elections or defections.

=== Airfield ===
Airfield (2 seats)
Party	Candidate	Votes	%	±%
Independent	J. Bagge*	Unopposed		
Conservative	H. Harris	Unopposed		
Registered electors		2,771		
Independent gain from Conservative				
Conservative hold				

=== Burnham ===
Burnham
Party	Candidate	Votes	%	±%
Independent	E. Coke*	747	94.0	+43.0
Liberal	P. Bird	48	6.0	N/A
Majority		699	87.9	+85.9
Turnout		795	60.6	–2.2
Registered electors		1,298		
Independent hold				

=== Clenchwarton ===
Clenchwarton
Party	Candidate	Votes	%	±%
Conservative	R. Kerkham*	346	52.5	N/A
Labour	F. Mallett	178	27.0	–7.4
Independent	J. Jones	135	20.5	N/A
Majority		168	25.5	+12.1
Turnout		659	45.7	+7.2
Registered electors		1,446		
Conservative gain from Ind. Conservative				

=== Creake ===
Creake
Party	Candidate	Votes	%	±%
Independent	F. Perowne*	589	76.5	+23.2
Labour	R. Lynn	181	23.5	–23.2
Majority		408	53.0	+46.2
Turnout		770	59.3	–5.1
Registered electors		1,298		
Independent hold		Swing	▲23.2	

=== Denton ===
Denton (3 seats)
Party	Candidate	Votes	%	±%
Conservative	J. Wood	1,108	61.9	+22.0
Conservative	M. Jones*	1,018	56.9	+23.0
Conservative	P. Caswell	986	55.1	+23.0
Labour	J. Waterfall*	689	38.5	+4.6
Labour	A. Blott	502	28.0	–3.0
Turnout		~1,789	44.7	–8.8
Registered electors		4,001		
Conservative hold				
Conservative hold				
Conservative gain from Labour				

=== Dersingham ===
Dersingham (2 seats)
Party	Candidate	Votes	%	±%
Conservative	I. Stockwell*	996	67.4	+23.1
Conservative	W. Greenwood	923	62.4	+20.8
Labour	M. Nurse	410	27.7	–16.6
Labour	P. Middleton	344	23.3	–15.1
Turnout		~1,479	51.9	–10.2
Registered electors		2,851		
Conservative hold				
Conservative gain from Labour				

=== Docking ===
Docking
Party	Candidate	Votes	%	±%
Labour	R. Blower	427	54.1	–0.5
Conservative	J. Hancock	363	45.9	N/A
Majority		64	8.1	–1.2
Turnout		790	59.6	+2.2
Registered electors		1,313		
Labour hold				

=== Emneth ===
Emneth
Party	Candidate	Votes	%	±%
Independent	A. Terrington*	307	57.2	+12.8
Ind. Conservative	C. Peckover	230	42.8	+12.5
Majority		77	14.4	+0.3
Turnout		537	37.0	–13.7
Registered electors		1,450		
Independent hold		Swing	▲0.2	

=== Gayton ===
Gayton
Party	Candidate	Votes	%	±%
Ind. Conservative	I. Major*	354	49.3	–11.4
Labour	M. Cross	217	30.2	N/A
Ind. Conservative	J. Bacon	147	20.5	–18.8
Majority		137	19.1	–2.3
Turnout		718	56.8	–2.8
Registered electors		1,266		
Ind. Conservative hold				

=== Lynn South West ===
Lynn South West (2 seats)
Party	Candidate	Votes	%	±%
Labour	D. Benefer*	669	73.9	–2.4
Labour	W. Baker*	617	68.2	–4.0
Conservative	A. Walker	211	23.3	–0.5
Turnout		~905	30.5	–3.7
Registered electors		2,967		
Labour hold				
Labour hold				

=== Mershe Lande ===
Mershe Lande
Party	Candidate	Votes	%	±%
Ind. Conservative	H. Goose*	498	69.8	N/A
Independent	W. Morton	120	16.8	N/A
Labour	J. Castle	97	13.6	N/A
Majority		378	53.0	N/A
Turnout		715	52.3	N/A
Registered electors		1,381		
Ind. Conservative hold				

=== Middleton ===
Middleton
Party	Candidate	Votes	%	±%
Independent	J. Lemon	438	63.9	N/A
Labour	C. Evans	247	36.1	–3.4
Majority		191	27.9	N/A
Turnout		685	48.3	+11.1
Registered electors		1,428		
Independent hold				

=== No. 1 (Kings Lynn: Gaywood) ===
No. 1 (Kings Lynn: Gaywood) (6 seats)
Party	Candidate	Votes	%	±%
Conservative	F. Barton	1,948	50.0	+10.6
Conservative	D. Garwood	1,857	47.7	+8.4
Conservative	N. Lumb	1,791	46.0	+7.1
Conservative	R. Sharp	1,780	45.7	+7.2
Conservative	G. Ison	1,704	43.7	+7.6
Conservative	A. Yelton	1,690	43.4	+8.5
Labour	J. Donaldson	1,641	42.1	–0.7
Labour	A. Campbell*	1,504	38.6	–3.4
Labour	M. Pantling*	1,478	37.9	–3.9
Labour	E. Shaw*	1,454	37.3	–4.3
Labour	A. West*	1,436	36.8	–3.2
Labour	A. Burch	1,415	36.3	–3.3
Independent	A. Goldsworthy	1,016	26.1	N/A
Turnout		~3,899	41.6	+2.5
Registered electors		9,374		
Conservative gain from Labour				
Conservative gain from Labour				
Conservative gain from Labour				
Conservative gain from Labour				
Conservative gain from Labour				
Conservative gain from Labour				

=== No. 2 (Kings Lynn: North) ===
No. 2 (Kings Lynn: North) (4 seats)
Party	Candidate	Votes	%	±%
Labour	F. Juniper*	969	70.0	–15.7
Labour	H. Birdseye*	871	62.9	–22.4
Labour	A. Panks*	830	60.0	–24.7
Labour	E. Panks*	790	57.1	–24.8
Conservative	A. Stopforth	271	19.6	+5.3
Conservative	K. Chester	270	19.5	+5.8
Conservative	E. Yelton	261	18.9	+5.4
Turnout		~1,385	27.2	–4.5
Registered electors		5,092		
Labour hold				
Labour hold				
Labour hold				
Labour hold				

=== No. 5 (Kings Lynn: Chase & Central) ===
No. 5 (Kings Lynn: Chase & Central) (3 seats)
Party	Candidate	Votes	%	±%
Conservative	B. Barton*	791	61.4	+14.5
Conservative	F. Cork*	748	58.0	+11.2
Conservative	R. Dawson*	707	54.8	+9.6
Labour	G. Coady	458	35.5	+10.7
Labour	I. Juniper	457	35.4	+14.3
Labour	M. Winton	430	33.4	+16.8
National Front	L. Goold	110	8.5	N/A
Turnout		~1,289	35.8	–2.4
Registered electors		3,601		
Conservative hold				
Conservative hold				
Conservative hold				

=== No. 6 (Downham Market) ===
No. 6 (Downham Market) (2 seats)
Party	Candidate	Votes	%	±%
Conservative	J. Bostock*	Unopposed		
Conservative	L. Brown	Unopposed		
Registered electors		3,424		
Conservative hold				
Conservative gain from Labour				

=== No. 7 (Hunstanton) ===
No. 7 (Hunstanton) (2 seats)
Party	Candidate	Votes	%	±%
Independent	T. Legge*	863	46.9	–45.7
Conservative	L. Brown*	857	46.6	N/A
Conservative	C. Matkin	790	42.9	N/A
Labour	W. Watson	398	21.6	N/A
Turnout		~1,841	56.0	+25.2
Registered electors		3,288		
Independent hold				
Conservative gain from Independent				

=== No. 9 (Heacham) ===
No. 9 (Heacham) (2 seats)
Party	Candidate	Votes	%	±%
Conservative	E. Gidney*	785	54.4	N/A
Labour	J. Wells*	544	37.7	–1.3
Independent	M. Jennings	468	32.4	N/A
Labour	F. Gourlay	354	24.5	–6.5
Independent	R. Joyce	288	19.9	–8.8
Turnout		~1,442	48.3	–5.5
Registered electors		2,986		
Conservative gain from Independent				
Labour hold				

=== No. 17 (Stoke Ferry) ===
No. 17 (Stoke Ferry)
Party	Candidate	Votes	%	±%
Conservative	F. Cowieson	443	70.0	N/A
Labour	A. Williams	190	30.0	N/A
Majority		253	40.0	N/A
Turnout		633	45.6	N/A
Registered electors		1,397		
Conservative gain from Ind. Conservative				

=== No. 18 (Denver) ===
No. 18 (Denver)
Party	Candidate	Votes	%	±%
Conservative	W. Bingham	Unopposed		
Registered electors		1,453		
Conservative hold				

=== No. 19 (Wimbotsham) ===
No. 19 (Wimbotsham)
Party	Candidate	Votes	%	±%
Conservative	J. Forgan	364	52.9	N/A
Independent	S. Boughen	239	34.7	N/A
Liberal	R. Frost	85	12.4	N/A
Majority		125	18.2	N/A
Turnout		688	54.8	+11.1
Registered electors		1,271		
Conservative gain from Independent				

=== No. 20 (Welney) ===
No. 20 (Welney)
Party	Candidate	Votes	%	±%
Conservative	H. Rose*	Unopposed		
Registered electors		1,229		
Conservative hold				

=== No. 25 (South Wootton) ===
No. 25 (South Wootton)
Party	Candidate	Votes	%	±%
Conservative	L. Dutton	818	84.1	N/A
Labour	E. Falcini	154	15.8	+2.0
Majority		664	68.3	N/A
Turnout		972	51.0	–10.4
Registered electors		1,915		
Conservative gain from Independent				

=== No. 26 (North Wootton) ===
No. 26 (North Wootton)
Party	Candidate	Votes	%	±%
Conservative	R. Spencer	658	80.0	N/A
Labour	G. Falcini	165	20.0	–25.6
Majority		493	60.0	N/A
Turnout		823	57.2	+11.8
Registered electors		1,442		
Conservative gain from Independent				

=== No. 27 (Massingham) ===
No. 27 (Massingham)
Party	Candidate	Votes	%	±%
Labour	J. Tilbury*	500	60.0	+32.0
Conservative	A. Everett	333	40.0	N/A
Majority		167	20.0	N/A
Turnout		833	65.0	+1.4
Registered electors		1,282		
Labour gain from Independent				

=== No. 28 (Grimston) ===
No. 28 (Grimston)
Party	Candidate	Votes	%	±%
Conservative	J. Reader*	406	66.4	N/A
Labour	P. Baker	205	33.6	–6.1
Majority		201	32.8	N/A
Turnout		611	42.9	+3.0
Registered electors		1,430		
Conservative gain from Independent				

=== No. 40 (Outwell & Upwell) ===
No. 40 (Outwell & Upwell) (2 seats)
Party	Candidate	Votes	%	±%
Conservative	E. Feary*	857	69.0	+16.3
Conservative	J. Shepherd	810	65.2	+26.2
Labour	K. Allday	267	21.5	N/A
Labour	H. Bell	208	16.7	N/A
Turnout		~1,243	57.1	–5.8
Registered electors		2,176		
Conservative hold				
Conservative gain from Independent				

=== North Coast ===
North Coast
Party	Candidate	Votes	%	±%
Conservative	H. Middleton*	Unopposed		
Registered electors		1,631		
Conservative gain from Independent				

=== Priory ===
Priory
Party	Candidate	Votes	%	±%
Labour	G. Sandle*	266	50.6	–22.0
Independent	G. Berry	260	49.4	+22.0
Majority		6	1.2	–44.0
Turnout		526	47.1	–0.6
Registered electors		1,120		
Labour hold		Swing	▼22.0	

=== Rudham ===
Rudham
Party	Candidate	Votes	%	±%
Labour	B. Seaman*	337	51.1	–19.7
Conservative	T. Ringer	284	43.1	N/A
Independent	T. Potter	39	5.9	N/A
Majority		53	8.0	–33.6
Turnout		660	64.9	
Registered electors		1,038		
Labour hold				

=== Snettisham ===
Snettisham
Party	Candidate	Votes	%	±%
Independent	F. Barwick	437	56.0	+34.9
Ind. Conservative	S. Hunt*	343	44.0	+11.5
Majority		94	12.0	N/A
Turnout		780	53.5	+8.9
Registered electors		1,506		
Independent gain from Ind. Conservative		Swing	▲11.7	

=== Spellowfields ===
Spellowfields (2 seats)
Party	Candidate	Votes	%	±%
Conservative	J. Howling	775	58.7	+31.4
Conservative	T. Bliss	713	54.0	N/A
Labour	W. Cowen	443	33.6	–2.1
Labour	D. Caney	379	28.7	+7.7
Turnout		~1,318	48.8	–24.2
Registered electors		2,701		
Conservative gain from Independent				
Conservative gain from Labour				

=== St. Lawrence ===
St. Lawrence
Party	Candidate	Votes	%	±%
Independent	C. Burman*	475	63.8	+8.0
Labour	F. Holland	269	36.2	–8.0
Majority		206	27.6	+16.0
Turnout		744	49.2	+2.1
Registered electors		1,532		
Independent hold		Swing	▲8.0	

=== St. Margarets ===
St. Margarets
Party	Candidate	Votes	%	±%
Labour	E. Edgley*	440	55.3	–9.1
Liberal	B. Goldstone	356	44.7	N/A
Majority		84	10.6	–18.2
Turnout		796	52.0	+7.2
Registered electors		1,547		
Labour hold				

=== Ten Mile ===
Ten Mile
Party	Candidate	Votes	%	±%
Labour	J. Simper*	382	53.5	–6.6
Conservative	H. Blakey	332	46.5	N/A
Majority		50	7.0	–13.2
Turnout		714	40.8	+0.8
Registered electors		1,752		
Labour hold				

=== The Walpoles ===
The Walpoles
Party	Candidate	Votes	%	±%
Ind. Conservative	K. Cousins*	372	58.3	+21.0
Labour	A. Green	266	41.7	N/A
Majority		106	16.6	+12.5
Turnout		638	38.5	–7.3
Registered electors		1,677		
Ind. Conservative gain from Independent				

=== Watlington ===
Watlington
Party	Candidate	Votes	%	±%
Conservative	P. Haynes	Unopposed		
Registered electors		1,438		
Conservative hold				

=== West Walton ===
West Walton
Party	Candidate	Votes	%	±%
Independent	F. Jude*	Unopposed		
Registered electors		1,009		
Independent hold				

=== West Winch ===
West Winch
Party	Candidate	Votes	%	±%
Conservative	R. Nichols	644	69.7	N/A
Labour	G. Cook	144	15.6	–13.4
Independent	F. Fuller	136	14.7	–28.4
Majority		500	54.1	N/A
Turnout		924	53.2	+7.3
Registered electors		1,747		
Conservative gain from Independent				

=== Wiggenhall ===
Wiggenhall
Party	Candidate	Votes	%	±%
Conservative	J. Turrell*	499	61.8	+13.1
Labour	N. Morley	308	38.2	+5.0
Majority		191	23.6	+8.1
Turnout		807	61.3	+14.3
Registered electors		1,321		
Conservative hold		Swing	▲4.1	
