= 2015 King's Lynn and West Norfolk Borough Council election =

2015 English local election

2015 King's Lynn & West Norfolk Borough Council election
- 7 May 2015

All 62 seats to King's Lynn & West Norfolk Borough Council 32 seats needed for a majority

	First party	Second party	Third party
Party	Conservative	Labour	Independent
Seats won	50	10	2
Seat change	▲8	▼3	▼1
Popular vote	54,682	18,204	6,500
Percentage	54.4%	18.1%	6.5%
Swing	▲0.4%	▼9.4%	▼4.6%
	Fourth party	Fifth party
Party	Green	Liberal Democrats
Seats won	0	0
Seat change	▼1	▼3
Popular vote	3,527	1,452
Percentage	3.5%	1.4%
Swing	▲0.6%	▼3.0%
Control before election
Conservative
Control after election
Conservative

The 2015 King's Lynn & West Norfolk Borough Council election took place on 7 May 2015 to elect members of King's Lynn & West Norfolk Borough Council in Norfolk, England. This was on the same day as the 2015 general election and other local elections.

== Summary ==
=== Election result ===
2015 King's Lynn & West Norfolk Borough Council election
Party	Candidates	Seats	Gains	Losses	Net gain/loss	Seats %	Votes %	Votes	+/−
Conservative	62	50	8	0	▲8	80.6	54.4	54,682	+0.4
Labour	32	10	0	3	▼3	16.1	18.1	18,204	–9.4
Independent	9	2	1	2	▼1	3.2	6.5	6,500	–4.6
UKIP	27	0	0	0	Steady	0.0	16.0	16,128	+15.8
Green	10	0	0	1	▼1	0.0	3.5	3,527	+0.6
Liberal Democrats	5	0	0	3	▼3	0.0	1.4	1,452	–3.0

== Ward results ==
Incumbent councillors standing for re-election are marked with an asterisk (*). Changes in seats do not take into account by-elections or defections.

=== Airfield ===
Airfield (2 seats)
Party	Candidate	Votes	%	±%
Conservative	Geoffrey Hipperson	1,256	67.0	
Conservative	Michael Howland*	843	45.0	
UKIP	Samantha Cooper	755	40.3	
UKIP	Thomas Scott	482	25.7	
Green	Bernadette Barclay	414	22.1	
Turnout		~1,875		
Conservative hold				
Conservative gain from Green				

=== Brancaster ===
Brancaster
Party	Candidate	Votes	%	±%
Conservative	Elizabeth Watson	537	64.2	
Independent	Robert Lawton	300	35.8	
Majority		237	28.4	
Turnout		837		
Conservative hold		Swing		

=== Burnham ===
Burnham
Party	Candidate	Votes	%	±%
Conservative	Samantha Sandell	654	70.3	
Liberal Democrats	Simon Wilson	276	29.7	
Majority		378	40.6	
Turnout		930		
Conservative hold		Swing		

=== Clenchwarton ===
Clenchwarton
Party	Candidate	Votes	%	±%
Conservative	David Whitby*	654	52.3	
Independent	Alexandra Kampouropoulos	597	47.7	
Majority		57	4.6	
Turnout		1,251		
Conservative hold		Swing		

=== Denton ===
Denton (3 seats)
Party	Candidate	Votes	%	±%
Conservative	Adrian Lawrence*	1,745	65.8	
Conservative	Martin Storey*	1,738	65.5	
Conservative	Michael Peake*	1,538	58.0	
UKIP	Thomas Edwards	1,274	48.0	
Labour	Sebastian Polhill	606	22.9	
Labour	Alun Ryves	588	22.2	
Labour	Philip Davies	467	17.6	
Turnout		~2,652		
Conservative hold				
Conservative hold				
Conservative hold				

=== Dersingham ===
Dersingham (2 seats)
Party	Candidate	Votes	%	±%
Conservative	Anthony Bubb*	1,419	51.6	
Conservative	Judith Collingham*	1,274	46.3	
UKIP	John Houston	855	31.1	
Liberal Democrats	Erika Coward	478	17.4	
Liberal Democrats	Richard Coward	435	15.8	
Turnout		~2,231		
Conservative gain from Liberal Democrats				
Conservative hold				

=== Docking ===
Docking
Party	Candidate	Votes	%	±%
Conservative	Andrew Morrison*	761	72.2	
Labour	Jeremy Wilson	293	27.8	
Majority		468	44.4	
Turnout		1,054		
Conservative hold		Swing		

=== Downham Old Town ===
Downham Old Town
Party	Candidate	Votes	%	±%
Conservative	Kathleen Mellish*	562	45.5	
Labour	Samantha Gipson	258	20.9	
UKIP	Conrad Brown	252	20.4	
Independent	John Doyle	164	13.3	
Majority		304	24.6	
Turnout		1,236		
Conservative hold		Swing		

=== East Downham ===
East Downham
Party	Candidate	Votes	%	±%
Conservative	Jacqueline Westrop	865	63.8	
Labour	Heather Fouracre	490	36.2	
Majority		375	27.6	
Turnout		1,355		
Conservative hold		Swing		

=== Emneth with Outwell ===
Emneth with Outwell (2 seats)
Party	Candidate	Votes	%	±%
Conservative	Christopher Crofts*	1,226	55.1	
Conservative	Harry Humphrey*	1,208	54.3	
UKIP	Anthony Jackson	999	44.9	
Turnout		~1,717		
Conservative hold				
Conservative hold				

=== Fairstead ===
Fairstead (2 seats)
Party	Candidate	Votes	%	±%
Labour	Margaret Wilkinson*	753	38.7	
Labour	Ian Gourlay*	727	37.4	
UKIP	James Perkins	599	30.8	
Conservative	Ronald Mortimer	593	30.5	
Conservative	Jonathan Williamson	469	24.1	
Turnout		~1,571		
Labour hold				
Labour hold				

=== Gayton ===
Gayton
Party	Candidate	Votes	%	±%
Conservative	Alistair Beales*	755	57.3	
UKIP	David Costin	398	30.2	
Green	Nigel Walker	165	12.5	
Majority		357	27.1	
Turnout		1,318		
Conservative hold		Swing		

=== Gaywood Chase ===
Gaywood Chase (2 seats)
Party	Candidate	Votes	%	±%
Labour	Sandra Collop*	753	35.6	
Labour	John Collop*	724	34.2	
Conservative	Ivan Goodson	712	33.7	
UKIP	Michael Stone	649	30.7	
Conservative	Christopher Wherrell	503	23.8	
Turnout		~1,671		
Labour hold				
Labour hold				

=== Gaywood North Bank ===
Gaywood North Bank (3 seats)
Party	Candidate	Votes	%	±%
Conservative	Mark Shorting*	1,451	36.0	
Conservative	Patrick Rochford	1,213	30.1	
Conservative	Thomas Smith	1,040	25.8	
UKIP	Elizabeth Barclay	1,021	25.4	
Labour	Jessica Barnard	983	24.4	
Labour	Colin Davies	899	22.3	
Labour	Ian Pritchard	847	21.0	
Independent	Stuart Hall	570	14.2	
Independent	Joy Franklin	541	13.4	
Turnout		~3,852		
Conservative hold				
Conservative hold				
Conservative gain from Labour				

=== Grimston ===
Grimston
Party	Candidate	Votes	%	±%
Conservative	Susan Fraser	572	43.3	
Green	Andrew de Whalley	454	34.4	
UKIP	Alan Bedwell	295	22.3	
Majority		118	8.9	
Turnout		1,321		
Conservative hold		Swing		

=== Heacham ===
Heacham (2 seats)
Party	Candidate	Votes	%	±%
Conservative	Peter Colvin	1,817	71.2	
Conservative	Colin Manning	1,313	51.5	
Labour	Emilia Rust	736	28.8	
Labour	Holly Rust	679	26.6	
Turnout		~2,273		
Conservative hold				
Conservative hold				

=== Hilgay with Denver ===
Hilgay with Denver
Party	Candidate	Votes	%	±%
Conservative	Anthony White	Unopposed		
Registered electors		?		
Conservative hold				

=== Hunstanton ===
Hunstanton (3 seats)
Party	Candidate	Votes	%	±%
Independent	Richard Bird*	1,522	44.6	
Conservative	Robert Beal*	1,193	34.9	
Conservative	Carol Bower	1,178	34.5	
Independent	Andrew Murray	1,116	32.7	
Conservative	Andrew Jamieson	816	23.9	
Independent	Adrian Maiden	791	23.2	
UKIP	John Fincham	700	20.5	
Turnout		~3,772		
Independent gain from Labour				
Conservative hold				
Conservative hold				

=== Mershe Lande ===
Mershe Lande
Party	Candidate	Votes	%	±%
Conservative	Brian Long*	752	59.8	
UKIP	Stephen Agnew	505	40.2	
Majority		247	19.6	
Turnout		1,257		
Conservative hold		Swing		

=== North Downham ===
North Downham
Party	Candidate	Votes	%	±%
Conservative	Geoffrey Wareham*	723	59.1	
Labour	Jonathan Toye	338	27.6	
Green	Eamonn McCusker	163	13.3	
Majority		385	31.5	
Turnout		1,224		
Conservative hold		Swing		

=== North Lynn ===
North Lynn (2 seats)
Party	Candidate	Votes	%	±%
Labour	Andrew Tyler*	770	41.1	
Labour	Sandra Buck	757	40.4	
UKIP	Adam Bowers	685	36.5	
Conservative	Marcelle Tweed	420	22.4	
Conservative	Anthony Dobson	362	19.3	
Turnout		~1,497		
Labour hold				
Labour hold				

=== North Wootton ===
North Wootton
Party	Candidate	Votes	%	±%
Conservative	Greville Howard*	796	56.5	
UKIP	Rosalie Costin	320	22.7	
Labour	Deborah Holman	294	20.9	
Majority		476	33.8	
Turnout		1,410		
Conservative hold		Swing		

=== Old Gaywood ===
Old Gaywood
Party	Candidate	Votes	%	±%
Conservative	Graham Middleton	338	33.9	
Labour	Gary Howman*	278	27.9	
UKIP	John Corden	239	24.0	
Green	Rachel Lawson	141	14.2	
Majority		60	6.0	
Turnout		996		
Conservative gain from Labour		Swing		

=== Priory ===
Priory
Party	Candidate	Votes	%	±%
Labour	James Moriarty*	816	59.0	
Conservative	Samanda Davison	568	41.0	
Majority		248	18.0	
Turnout		1,384		
Labour hold		Swing		

=== Rudham ===
Rudham
Party	Candidate	Votes	%	±%
Conservative	Michael Chenery of Horsbrugh*	800	65.1	
UKIP	Andrew Carr	428	34.9	
Majority		372	30.2	
Turnout		1,228		
Conservative hold		Swing		

=== St Lawrence ===
St Lawrence
Party	Candidate	Votes	%	±%
Conservative	Barry Ayres*	Unopposed		
Registered electors		?		
Conservative hold				

=== St Margarets with St Nicholas ===
St Margarets with St Nicholas (2 seats)
Party	Candidate	Votes	%	±%
Conservative	Lesley Bambridge*	714	42.8	
Labour	Claire Kittow	554	33.2	
Conservative	Andrew Wilson	531	31.8	
Labour	Kelly Terrey	523	31.4	
Green	Robert Archer	402	24.1	
Green	Jonathan Burr	250	15.0	
Turnout		~1,487		
Conservative hold				
Labour hold				

=== Snettisham ===
Snettisham (2 seats)
Party	Candidate	Votes	%	±%
Conservative	Ian Devereux	1,537	70.7	
Conservative	Avril Wright	1,354	62.3	
Labour	Richard Pennington	636	29.3	
Labour	Jean Shears	474	21.8	
Turnout		~2,001		
Conservative hold				
Conservative hold				

=== South and West Lynn ===
South and West Lynn (2 seats)
Party	Candidate	Votes	%	±%
Labour	Charles Joyce*	833	51.0	
Labour	Gary McGuinness*	802	49.1	
Conservative	Claire Garrod	799	49.0	
Conservative	Peter Pooley	583	35.8	
Turnout		~1,508		
Labour hold				
Labour hold				

=== South Downham ===
South Downham
Party	Candidate	Votes	%	±%
Conservative	Donald Tyler*	788	54.5	
UKIP	Ira Rose	383	26.5	
Labour	Michael Larcey	276	19.1	
Majority		405	28.0	
Turnout		1,447		
Conservative hold		Swing		

=== South Wootton ===
South Wootton (2 seats)
Party	Candidate	Votes	%	±%
Conservative	Nicholas Daubney*	1,648	69.2	
Conservative	Elizabeth Nockolds*	1,607	67.5	
Green	Verity Connolly	734	30.8	
Green	Edward Scholes	575	24.1	
Turnout		~2,282		
Conservative hold				
Conservative hold				

=== Spellowfields ===
Spellowfields (2 seats)
Party	Candidate	Votes	%	±%
Conservative	Paul Kunes	1,174	56.4	
Conservative	Sheila Young	865	41.6	
UKIP	Andrew Williams	756	36.3	
Labour	Steve Everett	150	7.2	
Turnout		~1,472		
Conservative hold				
Conservative hold				

=== Springwood ===
Springwood
Party	Candidate	Votes	%	±%
Conservative	Toby Wing-Pentelow	446	40.0	
Labour	Ken Hubbard	300	26.9	
UKIP	Clifford Walters	210	18.8	
Liberal Democrats	Ian Swinton	160	14.3	
Majority		146	13.1	
Turnout		1,116		
Conservative gain from Liberal Democrats		Swing		

=== Upwell and Delph ===
Upwell and Delph (2 seats)
Party	Candidate	Votes	%	±%
Conservative	David Pope*	1,277	55.9	
Conservative	Vivienne Spikings*	1,197	52.4	
UKIP	Colin Rose	1,009	44.1	
Turnout		~1,742		
Conservative hold				
Conservative hold				

=== Valley Hill ===
Valley Hill
Party	Candidate	Votes	%	±%
Independent	John Tilbury*	899	65.9	
Conservative	Gary Hart	466	34.1	
Majority		433	31.8	
Turnout		1,365		
Independent hold		Swing		

=== Walpole ===
Walpole
Party	Candidate	Votes	%	±%
Conservative	Richard Blunt	668	57.1	
UKIP	Trevor Roberts	501	42.9	
Majority		167	14.2	
Turnout		1,169		
Conservative hold		Swing		

=== Walton ===
Walton
Party	Candidate	Votes	%	±%
Conservative	Roy Groom*	Unopposed		
Registered electors		?		
Conservative hold				

=== Watlington ===
Watlington
Party	Candidate	Votes	%	±%
Conservative	Peter Hodson	507	38.6	
UKIP	Ashley Collins	373	28.4	
Labour	Triston Finnis	332	25.2	
Liberal Democrats	Ellen Taylor	103	7.8	
Majority		134	10.2	
Turnout		1,315		
Conservative gain from Liberal Democrats		Swing		

=== West Winch ===
West Winch (2 seats)
Party	Candidate	Votes	%	±%
Conservative	Baljinder Anota	1,305	59.7	
Conservative	Peter Gidney	1,286	58.8	
UKIP	June Leamon	882	40.3	
UKIP	Paul Foster	854	39.0	
Turnout		~2,164		
Conservative hold				
Conservative gain from Independent				

=== Wiggenhall ===
Wiggenhall
Party	Candidate	Votes	%	±%
Conservative	Marcus Hopkins*	529	46.9	
UKIP	Robert Scully	370	32.8	
Green	Kevin Holland	229	20.3	
Majority		159	14.1	
Turnout		1,128		
Conservative gain from Independent		Swing		

=== Wimbotsham with Fincham ===
Wimbotsham with Fincham
Party	Candidate	Votes	%	±%
Conservative	Sandra Squire	Unopposed		
Registered electors		?		
Conservative hold				

=== Wissey ===
Wissey
Party	Candidate	Votes	%	±%
Conservative	Colin Sampson*	737	55.0	
UKIP	William Whitmore	334	24.9	
Labour	Paula Kellingray	268	20.0	
Majority		403	30.1	
Turnout		1,339		
Conservative hold		Swing		
