= 2011 King's Lynn and West Norfolk Borough Council election =

2011 English local election

2011 King's Lynn & West Norfolk Borough Council election
- 5 May 2011

All 62 seats to King's Lynn & West Norfolk Borough Council 32 seats needed for a majority
- Registered: 132,514
- Turnout: 40.9% (▲14.8%)

	First party	Second party	Third party
Party	Conservative	Labour	Independent
Seats won	42	13	3
Seat change	▼10	▲9	▲1
Popular vote	37,452	19,064	7,699
Percentage	54.0%	27.5%	11.1%
Swing	▼7.0%	▲8.3%	▲8.0%
	Fourth party	Fifth party
Party	Liberal Democrats	Green
Seats won	3	1
Seat change	▼1	▲1
Popular vote	3,045	2,006
Percentage	4.4%	2.9%
Swing	▼7.2%	▲2.3%
Control before election
Conservative
Control after election
Conservative

The 2011 King's Lynn & West Norfolk Borough Council election took place on 5 May 2011 to elect members of King's Lynn & West Norfolk Borough Council in Norfolk, England. This was on the same day as other local elections.

== Summary ==
=== Election result ===
2011 King's Lynn & West Norfolk Borough Council election
Party	Candidates	Seats	Gains	Losses	Net gain/loss	Seats %	Votes %	Votes	+/−
Conservative	60	42	2	12	▼10	67.7	54.0	37,452	–7.0
Labour	44	13	9	0	▲9	21.0	27.5	19,064	+8.3
Independent	18	3	2	1	▲1	4.8	11.1	7,699	+8.0
Liberal Democrats	7	3	0	1	▼1	4.8	4.4	3,045	–7.2
Green	6	1	1	0	▲1	1.6	2.9	2,006	+2.3
UKIP	1	0	0	0	Steady	0.0	0.2	141	–1.9

== Ward results ==
Incumbent councillors standing for re-election are marked with an asterisk (*). Changes in seats do not take into account by-elections or defections.

=== Airfield ===
Airfield (2 seats)
Party	Candidate	Votes	%	±%
Conservative	Michael Howland	782	55.6	
Green	Lori Allen	386	27.4	
Labour	John Clarke	354	25.2	
Independent	Clive Bush	283	20.1	
Turnout		~1,407	39.8	
Registered electors		3,534		
Conservative hold				
Green gain from Conservative				

=== Brancaster ===
Brancaster
Party	Candidate	Votes	%	±%
Conservative	Tom de Winton*	Unopposed		
Registered electors		1,541		
Conservative hold				

=== Burnham ===
Burnham
Party	Candidate	Votes	%	±%
Conservative	Garry Sandell*	556	72.8	
Labour	Christopher Cook	208	27.2	
Majority		348	45.6	
Turnout		764	48.7	
Registered electors		1,588		
Conservative hold		Swing		

=== Clenchwarton ===
Clenchwarton
Party	Candidate	Votes	%	±%
Conservative	David Whitby	534	63.9	
Independent	Mark Fuller	302	36.1	
Majority		232	27.8	
Turnout		836	47.8	
Registered electors		1,785		
Conservative hold		Swing		

=== Denton ===
Denton (3 seats)
Party	Candidate	Votes	%	±%
Conservative	Martin Storey*	1,343	62.8	
Conservative	Adrian Lawrence*	1,279	59.8	
Conservative	Michael Peake*	1,171	54.7	
Labour	Matthew Fulton	520	24.3	
Labour	Margaret McGann	491	23.0	
Labour	Gwendoline Mansfield	451	21.1	
Turnout		~2,139	39.0	
Registered electors		5,485		
Conservative hold				
Conservative hold				
Conservative hold				

=== Dersingham ===
Dersingham (2 seats)
Party	Candidate	Votes	%	±%
Liberal Democrats	Anthony Bubb	955	50.5	
Conservative	Judith Collingham	939	49.6	
Conservative	Anthony Dobson	710	37.5	
Liberal Democrats	Kathleen Sayer	676	35.7	
Turnout		~1,892	48.5	
Registered electors		3,902		
Liberal Democrats hold				
Conservative hold				

=== Docking ===
Docking
Party	Candidate	Votes	%	±%
Conservative	Andrew Morrison*	Unopposed		
Registered electors		1,686		
Conservative hold				

=== Downham Old Town ===
Downham Old Town
Party	Candidate	Votes	%	±%
Conservative	Kathy Mellish*	475	65.9	
Labour	Peter Smith	246	34.1	
Majority		229	31.8	
Turnout		721	38.5	
Registered electors		1,907		
Conservative hold		Swing		

=== East Downham ===
East Downham
Party	Candidate	Votes	%	±%
Conservative	Anthony Lovett*	484	60.8	
Labour	Heather Fouracre	312	39.2	
Majority		172	21.6	
Turnout		796	36.3	
Registered electors		2,222		
Conservative hold		Swing		

=== Emneth with Outwell ===
Emneth with Outwell (2 seats)
Party	Candidate	Votes	%	±%
Conservative	Christopher Crofts*	733	57.6	
Conservative	Harry Humphrey*	690	54.2	
Independent	Sally Rust	341	26.8	
Independent	Kevin Martin	254	20.0	
Turnout		~1,272	33.7	
Registered electors		3,774		
Conservative hold				
Conservative hold				

=== Fairstead ===
Fairstead (2 seats)
Party	Candidate	Votes	%	±%
Labour	Margaret Wilkinson*	560	53.7	
Labour	Ian Gourlay*	521	50.0	
Conservative	Leonard Fulcher	407	39.1	
Conservative	Carolyn Taylor	389	37.4	
Turnout		~1,123	26.0	
Registered electors		4,321		
Labour hold				
Labour hold				

=== Gayton ===
Gayton
Party	Candidate	Votes	%	±%
Conservative	Alistair Beales*	587	66.3	
Labour	John Burns	203	22.9	
Green	Nigel Walker	96	10.8	
Majority		384	43.4	
Turnout		886	48.4	
Registered electors		1,842		
Conservative hold		Swing		

=== Gaywood Chase ===
Gaywood Chase (2 seats)
Party	Candidate	Votes	%	±%
Labour	John Collop	505	42.5	
Labour	Sandra Collop	471	39.6	
Conservative	Ann Jacka	372	31.3	
Conservative	Ivan Goodson*	349	29.4	
Liberal Democrats	Ian Swinton	221	18.6	
Liberal Democrats	Colin Sayer	188	15.8	
UKIP	Michael Stone	141	11.9	
Turnout		~1,272	33.4	
Registered electors		3,811		
Labour gain from Conservative				
Labour gain from Conservative				

=== Gaywood North Bank ===
Gaywood North Bank (3 seats)
Party	Candidate	Votes	%	±%
Conservative	Michael Langwade*	849	37.2	
Conservative	Mark Shorting*	813	35.6	
Labour	Laurence Scott	755	33.1	
Conservative	Clifford Walters*	751	32.9	
Labour	Ashley Collop	693	30.4	
Labour	Ian Pritchard	636	27.9	
Green	Victoria Fairweather	551	24.2	
Independent	Joy Franklin	513	22.5	
Turnout		~2,276	38.2	
Registered electors		5,958		
Conservative hold				
Conservative hold				
Labour gain from Conservative				

=== Grimston ===
Grimston
Party	Candidate	Votes	%	±%
Conservative	Michael Pitcher*	488	50.2	
Green	Andrew de Whalley	485	49.8	
Majority		3	0.4	
Turnout		973	50.7	
Registered electors		1,933		
Conservative hold		Swing		

=== Heacham ===
Heacham (2 seats)
Party	Candidate	Votes	%	±%
Conservative	Stephanie Smeaton*	1,181	54.1	
Conservative	Colin Manning	1,007	46.1	
Labour	Emilia Rust	550	25.2	
Labour	Holly Rust	538	24.6	
Turnout		~1,850	45.5	
Registered electors		4,063		
Conservative hold				
Conservative hold				

=== Hilgay with Denver ===
Hilgay with Denver
Party	Candidate	Votes	%	±%
Conservative	Anthony White*	372	44.9	
Independent	Graham Carter	338	40.8	
Labour	Jeremy Annone	118	14.3	
Majority		34	4.1	
Turnout		828	42.5	
Registered electors		1,947		
Conservative hold		Swing		

=== Hunstanton ===
Hunstanton (3 seats)
Party	Candidate	Votes	%	±%
Conservative	Robert Beal	1,106	37.1	
Labour	Richard Bird	974	32.7	
Conservative	Elizabeth Watson*	919	30.8	
Conservative	Jason Law*	876	29.4	
Independent	Andrew Murray	794	26.7	
Labour	Stuart Bagnall	742	24.9	
Labour	Brian Devlin	668	22.4	
Turnout		~2,329	49.9	
Registered electors		4,669		
Conservative hold				
Labour gain from Conservative				
Conservative hold				

=== Mershe Lande ===
Mershe Lande
Party	Candidate	Votes	%	±%
Conservative	Brian Long*	498	70.2	
Independent	Paul McGhee	211	29.8	
Majority		287	40.4	
Turnout		709	35.8	
Registered electors		2,025		
Conservative gain from Independent		Swing		

=== North Downham ===
North Downham
Party	Candidate	Votes	%	±%
Conservative	Geoffrey Wareham*	489	65.7	
Labour	Jonathan Toye	255	34.3	
Majority		234	31.4	
Turnout		744	44.2	
Registered electors		1,695		
Conservative hold		Swing		

=== North Lynn ===
North Lynn (2 seats)
Party	Candidate	Votes	%	±%
Labour	David Collis*	620	45.3	
Labour	Andrew Tyler*	511	37.4	
Conservative	Peter Lagoda*	286	21.0	
Conservative	Michael Pratt	223	16.3	
Turnout		~1,002	23.9	
Registered electors		4,196		
Labour hold				
Labour hold				

=== North Wootton ===
North Wootton
Party	Candidate	Votes	%	±%
Conservative	Greville Howard*	591	59.2	
Labour	Looraine Howman	407	40.8	
Majority		184	18.4	
Turnout		998	51.6	
Registered electors		1,951		
Conservative hold		Swing		

=== Old Gaywood ===
Old Gaywood
Party	Candidate	Votes	%	±%
Labour	Gary Howman	335	57.3	
Conservative	William Daws*	250	42.7	
Majority		85	14.6	
Turnout		585	38.6	
Registered electors		1,530		
Labour gain from Conservative		Swing		

=== Priory ===
Priory
Party	Candidate	Votes	%	±%
Labour	James Moriarty	637	63.0	
Conservative	Peter Gidney	374	37.0	
Majority		263	26.0	
Turnout		1,011	52.8	
Registered electors		1,947		
Labour gain from Conservative		Swing		

=== Rudham ===
Rudham
Party	Candidate	Votes	%	±%
Conservative	Michael Chenery of Horsburgh	611	60.9	
Independent	Michael Knights	393	39.1	
Majority		218	21.8	
Turnout		1,004	52.2	
Registered electors		1,945		
Conservative hold		Swing		

=== Snettisham ===
Snettisham (2 seats)
Party	Candidate	Votes	%	±%
Conservative	David Johnson*	1,113	53.4	
Conservative	Zipha Christopher*	969	46.6	
Labour	Richard Pennington	494	23.7	
Turnout		~1,680	48.3	
Registered electors		3,477		
Conservative hold				
Conservative hold				

=== South & West Lynn ===
South & West Lynn (2 seats)
Party	Candidate	Votes	%	±%
Labour	Charles Joyce	546	41.2	
Labour	Gary McGuinness	467	35.3	
Conservative	Geoffrey Daniell*	354	26.7	
Conservative	Valerie Daniell	302	22.8	
Green	Jonathan Burr	224	16.9	
Turnout		~1,110	32.1	
Registered electors		3,461		
Labour gain from Conservative				
Labour gain from Conservative				

=== South Downham ===
South Downham
Party	Candidate	Votes	%	±%
Conservative	Donald Tyler	726	73.1	
Labour	Julie Coulter	267	26.9	
Majority		459	46.2	
Turnout		993	53.0	
Registered electors		1,931		
Conservative hold		Swing		

=== South Wootton ===
South Wootton (2 seats)
Party	Candidate	Votes	%	±%
Conservative	Nicholas Daubney*	1,261	57.5	
Conservative	Elizabeth Nockolds*	1,257	57.3	
Labour	Claire Penston	488	22.2	
Labour	Christopher Penston	458	20.9	
Turnout		~1,858	51.8	
Registered electors		3,589		
Conservative hold				
Conservative hold				

=== Spellowfields ===
Spellowfields (2 seats)
Party	Candidate	Votes	%	±%
Conservative	David Harwood*	524	39.7	
Conservative	Peter Cousins	456	34.6	
Independent	Paul Moore	450	34.1	
Independent	Charles Johnson	429	32.5	
Labour	Stephanie Munden	347	26.3	
Turnout		~1,413	37.7	
Registered electors		3,749		
Conservative hold				
Conservative hold				

=== Springwood ===
Springwood
Party	Candidate	Votes	%	±%
Liberal Democrats	John Loveless*	325	43.9	
Labour	Joanne Rust	215	29.0	
Conservative	Elizabeth Barclay	201	27.1	
Majority		110	14.8	
Turnout		741	48.0	
Registered electors		1,560		
Liberal Democrats hold		Swing		

=== St. Lawrence ===
St. Lawrence
Party	Candidate	Votes	%	±%
Conservative	Barry Ayres*	514	61.3	
Independent	Richard Jarvis	324	38.7	
Majority		190	22.6	
Turnout		838	43.1	
Registered electors		1,982		
Conservative hold		Swing		

=== St. Margarets with St. Nicholas ===
St. Margarets with St. Nicholas (2 seats)
Party	Candidate	Votes	%	±%
Labour	Mark Back	448	32.2	
Conservative	Lesley Bambridge*	418	30.0	
Labour	Alexandra Kampouropoulos	368	26.4	
Conservative	Jan Woning	337	24.2	
Green	Robert Archer	264	19.0	
Independent	Julian Litten	263	18.9	
Turnout		~1,393	35.5	
Registered electors		3,466		
Labour gain from Conservative				
Conservative hold				

=== Upwell & Delph ===
Upwell & Delph (2 seats)
Party	Candidate	Votes	%	±%
Conservative	Vivienne Spikings*	980	53.1	
Conservative	David Pope*	854	46.3	
Labour	Roger Parnell	351	19.0	
Labour	Edward Skelton	321	17.4	
Turnout		~1,506	37.9	
Registered electors		3,896		
Conservative hold				
Conservative hold				

=== Valley Hill ===
Valley Hill
Party	Candidate	Votes	%	±%
Independent	John Tilbury*	766	76.3	
Conservative	Gary Hart	238	23.7	
Majority		528	52.6	
Turnout		1,004	54.3	
Registered electors		1,871		
Independent hold		Swing		

=== Walpole ===
Walpole
Party	Candidate	Votes	%	±%
Conservative	Anthony Wright	436	65.1	
Labour	Alan Munden	234	34.9	
Majority		202	30.2	
Turnout		670	37.9	
Registered electors		1,766		
Conservative gain from Liberal Democrats		Swing		

=== Walton ===
Walton
Party	Candidate	Votes	%	±%
Conservative	Roy Groom*	Unopposed		
Registered electors		2,132		
Conservative hold				

=== Watlington ===
Watlington
Party	Candidate	Votes	%	±%
Liberal Democrats	Ian Mack*	635	82.5	
Labour	Tobias Brown	135	17.5	
Majority		500	65.0	
Turnout		770	42.0	
Registered electors		1,879		
Liberal Democrats hold		Swing		

=== West Winch ===
West Winch (2 seats)
Party	Candidate	Votes	%	±%
Conservative	Paul Foster	923	28.7	
Independent	June Leamon	878	27.3	
Conservative	Gillian Sergeant	771	24.0	
Independent	Susan Neil	608	18.9	
Turnout		~1,850	48.1	
Registered electors		3,906		
Conservative hold				
Independent gain from Conservative				

=== Wiggenhall ===
Wiggenhall
Party	Candidate	Votes	%	±%
Independent	Marcus Hopkins	361	44.0	
Conservative	Richard Portham	276	33.7	
Labour	Ashley Collins	183	22.3	
Majority		85	10.3	
Turnout		820	49.8	
Registered electors		1,674		
Independent hold		Swing		

=== Wimbotsham with Fincham ===
Wimbotsham with Fincham
Party	Candidate	Votes	%	±%
Conservative	Trevor Manley*	599	69.0	
Labour	June Kellingray	269	31.0	
Majority		330	38.0	
Turnout		868	45.3	
Registered electors		2,022		
Conservative hold		Swing		

=== Wissey ===
Wissey
Party	Candidate	Votes	%	±%
Conservative	Colin Sampson*	459	51.7	
Labour	Paula Kellingray	192	21.6	
Independent	John Nicholas-Letch	191	21.5	
Liberal Democrats	Christopher MacKinnon	45	5.1	
Majority		267	30.1	
Turnout		887	47.6	
Registered electors		1,888		
Conservative hold		Swing		
