= 1999 King's Lynn and West Norfolk Borough Council election =

King's Lynn and West Norfolk Borough Council election

- 6 May 1999

All 60 seats to King's Lynn and West Norfolk Borough Council 31 seats needed for a majority
- Registered: 115,078
- Turnout: ~32.1% (▼4.4%)

	First party	Second party
Party	Labour	Conservative
Seats won	27	26
Seat change	▼10	▲19
Popular vote	24,034	27,801
Percentage	39.9%	46.2%
Swing	▼9.1%	▲23.4%
	Third party	Fourth party
Party	Liberal Democrats	Independent
Seats won	5	2
Seat change	▼1	▼8
Popular vote	6,555	1,810
Percentage	10.9%	3.0%
Swing	▼2.0%	▼11.9%
- Winner of each seat at the 1999 King's Lynn & West Norfolk Borough Council election.
Council control before election
Labour
Council control after election
No overall control

The 1999 King's Lynn and West Norfolk Borough Council election took place on 6 May 1999 to elect members of King's Lynn and West Norfolk Borough Council in England. This was on the same day as other local elections.

== Election result ==
1999 King's Lynn & West Norfolk Borough Council election
Party	Candidates	Seats	Gains	Losses	Net gain/loss	Seats %	Votes %	Votes	+/−
Labour	56	27			▼10	45.0	39.9	24,034	–9.1
Conservative	56	26			▲19	43.3	46.2	27,801	+23.4
Liberal Democrats	23	5			▼1	10.9	10.9	6,555	–2.0
Independent	5	2			▼8	3.3	3.0	1,810	–11.9
Green	1	0			Steady	0.0	0.1	32	N/A

== Ward results ==
Incumbent councillors standing for re-election are marked with an asterisk (*). Changes in seats do not take into account by-elections or defections.

=== Airfield ===
Airfield (2 seats)
Party	Candidate	Votes	%	±%
Conservative	G. Hipperson	559	53.5	
Labour	I. Macdonald*	476	45.6	
Labour	R. Everitt*	447	42.8	
Turnout		~1,044	37.1	
Registered electors		2,813		
Conservative gain from Labour				
Labour hold				

=== Burnham ===
Burnham
Party	Candidate	Votes	%	±%
Conservative	S. Faire	476	69.8	
Labour	J. Mitchell	206	30.2	
Majority		270	39.6	
Turnout		682	48.8	
Registered electors		1,399		
Conservative gain from Independent		Swing		

=== Chase ===
Chase (2 seats)
Party	Candidate	Votes	%	±%
Labour	D. Berry*	611	66.0	
Labour	E. Benefer*	600	64.8	
Conservative	J. Waldron	235	25.4	
Conservative	A. White	219	23.7	
Liberal Democrats	N. Farthing	84	9.1	
Liberal Democrats	D. Neve	75	8.1	
Turnout		~926	31.1	
Registered electors		2,976		
Labour hold				
Labour hold				

=== Clenchwarton ===
Clenchwarton
Party	Candidate	Votes	%	±%
Liberal Democrats	P. Brandon*	440	64.2	
Conservative	J. May	245	35.8	
Majority		195	28.4	
Turnout		685	39.4	
Registered electors		1,745		
Liberal Democrats hold		Swing		

=== Creake ===
Creake
Party	Candidate	Votes	%	±%
Conservative	G. Sandell	412	62.8	
Labour	C. Slater	244	37.2	
Majority		168	25.6	
Turnout		656	43.8	
Registered electors		1,499		
Conservative gain from Labour		Swing		

=== Denton ===
Denton (3 seats)
Party	Candidate	Votes	%	±%
Conservative	M. Storey*	772	56.8	
Conservative	C. Sharp*	747	54.9	
Conservative	M. Peake	621	45.7	
Liberal Democrats	D. Buckton*	582	42.8	
Labour	W. Mansfield	340	25.0	
Labour	G. Mansfield	339	24.9	
Turnout		~1,360	34.3	
Registered electors		3,966		
Conservative hold				
Conservative hold				
Conservative gain from Liberal Democrats				

=== Denver ===
Denver
Party	Candidate	Votes	%	±%
Conservative	A. White*	267	64.6	
Labour	J. Oxenbould	146	35.4	
Majority		121	29.2	
Turnout		413	35.2	
Registered electors		1,177		
Conservative gain from Labour		Swing		

=== Dersingham ===
Dersingham (2 seats)
Party	Candidate	Votes	%	±%
Liberal Democrats	P. Burrall*	1,062	53.3	
Conservative	G. Pratt*	916	46.0	
Liberal Democrats	J. Hayward	700	35.1	
Conservative	P. Mirich	629	31.6	
Labour	R. Pennington	357	17.9	
Turnout		~1,993	44.9	
Registered electors		4,438		
Liberal Democrats hold				
Conservative hold				

=== Docking ===
Docking
Party	Candidate	Votes	%	±%
Labour	K. Ives	257	51.5	
Conservative	M. Hembling	242	48.5	
Majority		15	3.0	
Turnout		499	32.0	
Registered electors		1,560		
Labour hold		Swing		

=== Downham Market ===
Downham Market (3 seats)
Party	Candidate	Votes	%	±%
Conservative	D. Forgan*	1,405	58.4	
Conservative	J. Legg*	1,351	56.2	
Conservative	A. Lovett	1,254	52.1	
Labour	M. Stewart	914	38.0	
Labour	K. Griggs	707	29.4	
Labour	A. Ayres	665	27.7	
Turnout		~2,405	38.1	
Registered electors		6,313		
Conservative gain from Independent				
Conservative gain from Independent				
Conservative hold				

=== Emneth ===
Emneth
Party	Candidate	Votes	%	±%
Conservative	A. Humphrey	261	57.5	
Labour	I. Harley*	164	36.1	
Liberal Democrats	M. Farrelly	29	6.4	
Majority		97	21.4	
Turnout		454	25.3	
Registered electors		1,797		
Conservative gain from Labour		Swing		

=== Gayton ===
Gayton
Party	Candidate	Votes	%	±%
Conservative	I. Major*	346	43.3	
Liberal Democrats	D. Parish	309	38.6	
Labour	N. Townshend	145	18.1	
Majority		37	4.7	
Turnout		800	48.5	
Registered electors		1,657		
Conservative gain from Independent		Swing		

=== Gaywood Central ===
Gaywood Central (2 seats)
Party	Candidate	Votes	%	±%
Liberal Democrats	J. Loveless	511	41.4	
Labour	A. Luckett*	409	33.1	
Liberal Democrats	M. Farthing	398	32.2	
Labour	J. Jenkins	388	31.4	
Conservative	Y. Foster	358	29.0	
Conservative	D. Rye	338	27.4	
Turnout		~1,241	38.5	
Registered electors		3,223		
Liberal Democrats gain from Labour				
Labour hold				

=== Gaywood North ===
Gaywood North (3 seats)
Party	Candidate	Votes	%	±%
Labour	J. Collop	791	51.9	
Labour	D. Collis*	782	51.3	
Labour	C. Walters*	746	48.9	
Conservative	M. Langwade	664	43.5	
Conservative	I. Goodson	621	40.7	
Conservative	B. Watson	619	40.6	
Turnout		~1,517	26.7	
Registered electors		5,683		
Labour hold				
Labour hold				
Labour hold				

=== Gaywood South ===
Gaywood South (3 seats)
Party	Candidate	Votes	%	±%
Labour	B. Burch*	698	66.2	
Labour	A. Burch*	684	64.9	
Labour	M. Wilkinson*	675	64.1	
Conservative	S. Waldron	248	23.6	
Conservative	J. Huggett	228	21.6	
Conservative	H. Dobson	220	20.9	
Turnout		~1,053	22.4	
Registered electors		4,699		
Labour hold				
Labour hold				
Labour hold				

=== Grimston ===
Grimston
Party	Candidate	Votes	%	±%
Liberal Democrats	H. Fredericks*	609	55.7	
Conservative	T. Tilbrook	484	44.3	
Majority		125	11.4	
Turnout		1,093	48.9	
Registered electors		2,249		
Liberal Democrats hold		Swing		

=== Heacham ===
Heacham (2 seats)
Party	Candidate	Votes	%	±%
Labour	M. Liddington*	1,112	60.4	
Labour	P. Cobb	952	51.7	
Conservative	H. Buscall	776	42.2	
Conservative	M. Horsbrugh	684	37.2	
Turnout		~1,840	43.0	
Registered electors		4,319		
Labour hold				
Labour hold				

=== Hunstanton ===
Hunstanton (2 seats)
Party	Candidate	Votes	%	±%
Conservative	M. Wood*	894	46.4	
Conservative	C. Matkin*	879	45.6	
Labour	B. Devlin	741	38.4	
Labour	E. Bird	650	33.7	
Independent	N. Mitchison	261	13.5	
Turnout		~1,826	42.8	
Registered electors		4,259		
Conservative gain from Independent				
Conservative hold				

=== Lynn Central ===
Lynn Central (2 seats)
Party	Candidate	Votes	%	±%
Labour	J. Roper*	325	45.6	
Conservative	J. Cook	275	38.6	
Labour	E. Sheridan	256	36.0	
Conservative	Y. Foster	250	35.1	
Liberal Democrats	A. Loades	112	15.7	
Liberal Democrats	K. Sayer	100	14.0	
Turnout		~713	32.0	
Registered electors		2,247		
Labour hold				
Conservative gain from Labour				

=== Lynn North ===
Lynn North (2 seats)
Party	Candidate	Votes	%	±%
Labour	L. Poll	380	81.4	
Labour	A. Tyler	357	76.5	
Conservative	L. Bambridge	87	18.6	
Conservative	K. Roberts	81	17.3	
Turnout		~468	20.9	
Registered electors		2,466		
Labour hold				
Labour hold				

=== Lynn South West ===
Lynn South West (2 seats)
Party	Candidate	Votes	%	±%
Labour	D. Benefer*	471	70.1	
Labour	C. Joyce*	444	66.1	
Conservative	C. Garrod	201	29.9	
Conservative	C. Maccallum	166	24.7	
Turnout		~672	26.4	
Registered electors		2,450		
Labour hold				
Labour hold				

=== Mershe Lande ===
Mershe Lande
Party	Candidate	Votes	%	±%
Labour	J. Bantoft*	409	63.6	
Conservative	K. Green	234	36.4	
Majority		175	27.2	
Turnout		643	32.1	
Registered electors		2,006		
Labour hold		Swing		

=== Middleton ===
Middleton
Party	Candidate	Votes	%	±%
Conservative	J. Mickleburgh	385	57.9	
Labour	E. Sheridan*	280	42.1	
Majority		105	15.8	
Turnout		665	36.2	
Registered electors		1,831		
Conservative gain from Labour		Swing		

=== North Coast ===
North Coast
Party	Candidate	Votes	%	±%
Conservative	A. Dobson	574	75.6	
Labour	C. Peak	185	24.4	
Majority		389	51.2	
Turnout		759	37.1	
Registered electors		2,058		
Conservative gain from Independent		Swing		

=== Priory ===
Priory
Party	Candidate	Votes	%	±%
Labour	J. Moriarty	342	61.6	
Conservative	L. Herring	181	32.6	
Green	N. Walker	32	5.8	
Majority		161	29.0	
Turnout		555	45.0	
Registered electors		1,240		
Labour hold		Swing		

=== Rudham ===
Rudham
Party	Candidate	Votes	%	±%
Labour	B. Seaman*	257	51.9	
Conservative	E. Linge	202	40.8	
Liberal Democrats	M. Hayward	36	7.3	
Majority		55	11.1	
Turnout		495	42.6	
Registered electors		1,111		
Labour hold		Swing		

=== Snettisham ===
Snettisham
Party	Candidate	Votes	%	±%
Labour	C. Tilbury*	397	55.4	
Conservative	D. Gatward	283	39.5	
Liberal Democrats	C. Yardley	36	5.0	
Majority		114	15.9	
Turnout		716	36.9	
Registered electors		1,940		
Labour hold		Swing		

=== Spellowfields ===
Spellowfields (2 seats)
Party	Candidate	Votes	%	±%
Conservative	D. Harwood	531	44.8	
Conservative	M. Mansfield	428	36.1	
Liberal Democrats	M. Walker*	387	32.6	
Labour	M. Dungay*	328	27.6	
Labour	A. Munden	305	25.7	
Liberal Democrats	F. James	218	18.4	
Turnout		~1,185	34.1	
Registered electors		3,407		
Conservative gain from Liberal Democrats				
Conservative gain from Labour				

=== St. Lawrence ===
St. Lawrence
Party	Candidate	Votes	%	±%
Labour	P. Bantoft*	347	54.7	
Conservative	D. Whitby	287	45.3	
Majority		60	9.4	
Turnout		634	35.1	
Registered electors		1,808		
Labour hold		Swing		

=== St. Margarets ===
St. Margarets
Party	Candidate	Votes	%	±%
Labour	P. Richards*	440	81.0	
Conservative	R. Straker	103	19.0	
Majority		337	62.0	
Turnout		543	36.0	
Registered electors		1,515		
Labour hold		Swing		

=== Ten Mile ===
Ten Mile
Party	Candidate	Votes	%	±%
Labour	J. Simper*	Unopposed		
Registered electors		1,783		
Labour hold				

=== The Walpoles ===
The Walpoles
Party	Candidate	Votes	%	±%
Conservative	D. Bayley	385	54.2	
Labour	G. Stow*	251	35.4	
Liberal Democrats	A. Loades	74	10.4	
Majority		134	18.8	
Turnout		710	33.0	
Registered electors		2,158		
Conservative gain from Labour		Swing		

=== The Woottons ===
The Woottons (2 seats)
Party	Candidate	Votes	%	±%
Conservative	N. Daubney	1,157	52.6	
Conservative	E. Nockolds	1,129	51.3	
Labour	M. Pantling	522	23.7	
Independent	R. Spencer*	519	23.6	
Labour	I. Gourlay	479	21.8	
Turnout		~2,027	41.7	
Registered electors		4,867		
Conservative gain from Independent				
Conservative gain from Independent				

=== Upwell Outwell & Delph ===
Upwell Outwell & Delph (2 seats)
Party	Candidate	Votes	%	±%
Conservative	V. Spikings	903	48.9	
Independent	D. Barnard	372	20.1	
Labour	L. Keer	344	18.6	
Labour	R. Parnell	302	16.3	
Independent	A. Feary*	294	15.9	
Liberal Democrats	F. Emment	140	7.6	
Turnout		~1,335	30.9	
Registered electors		4,321		
Conservative hold				
Independent hold				

=== Valley Hill ===
Valley Hill
Party	Candidate	Votes	%	±%
Labour	J. Tilbury*	461	54.1	
Conservative	K. Fletcher	305	35.8	
Liberal Democrats	K. Sayer	86	10.1	
Majority		156	18.3	
Turnout		852	47.7	
Registered electors		1,790		
Labour hold		Swing		

=== Watlington ===
Watlington
Party	Candidate	Votes	%	±%
Conservative	J. Ansell	498	68.4	
Labour	G. Holding	164	22.5	
Liberal Democrats	M. Burrell	66	9.1	
Majority		334	45.9	
Turnout		728	32.3	
Registered electors		2,255		
Conservative hold		Swing		

=== West Walton ===
West Walton
Party	Candidate	Votes	%	±%
Independent	R. Groom*	364	90.3	
Liberal Democrats	M. Standeven	21	5.2	
Labour	J. Tinsley	18	4.5	
Majority		343	85.8	
Turnout		403	33.0	
Registered electors		1,220		
Independent hold		Swing		

=== West Winch ===
West Winch
Party	Candidate	Votes	%	±%
Liberal Democrats	J. Brown	478	45.6	
Conservative	G. Dawes*	417	39.8	
Labour	A. Williams	154	14.7	
Majority		61	5.8	
Turnout		1,049	42.6	
Registered electors		2,453		
Liberal Democrats gain from Labour		Swing		

=== Wiggenhall ===
Wiggenhall
Party	Candidate	Votes	%	±%
Labour	L. Wilkinson*	342	55.1	
Conservative	P. Foster	279	44.9	
Majority		63	10.2	
Turnout		621	44.0	
Registered electors		1,429		
Labour hold		Swing		

=== Wissey ===
Wissey
Party	Candidate	Votes	%	±%
Conservative	T. Manley	490	68.2	
Labour	P. Kellingray	228	31.8	
Majority		262	36.4	
Turnout		718	36.7	
Registered electors		1,956		
Conservative gain from Liberal Democrats		Swing		
