= 1973 Bristol City Council election =

1973 UK local government election

7 June 1973	1976 →

All 84 seats to Bristol City Council 43 seats needed for a majority
	First party	Second party	Third party
Party	Labour	Conservative	Liberal
Seats won	56	25	3
Council control after election
Labour Party (UK)

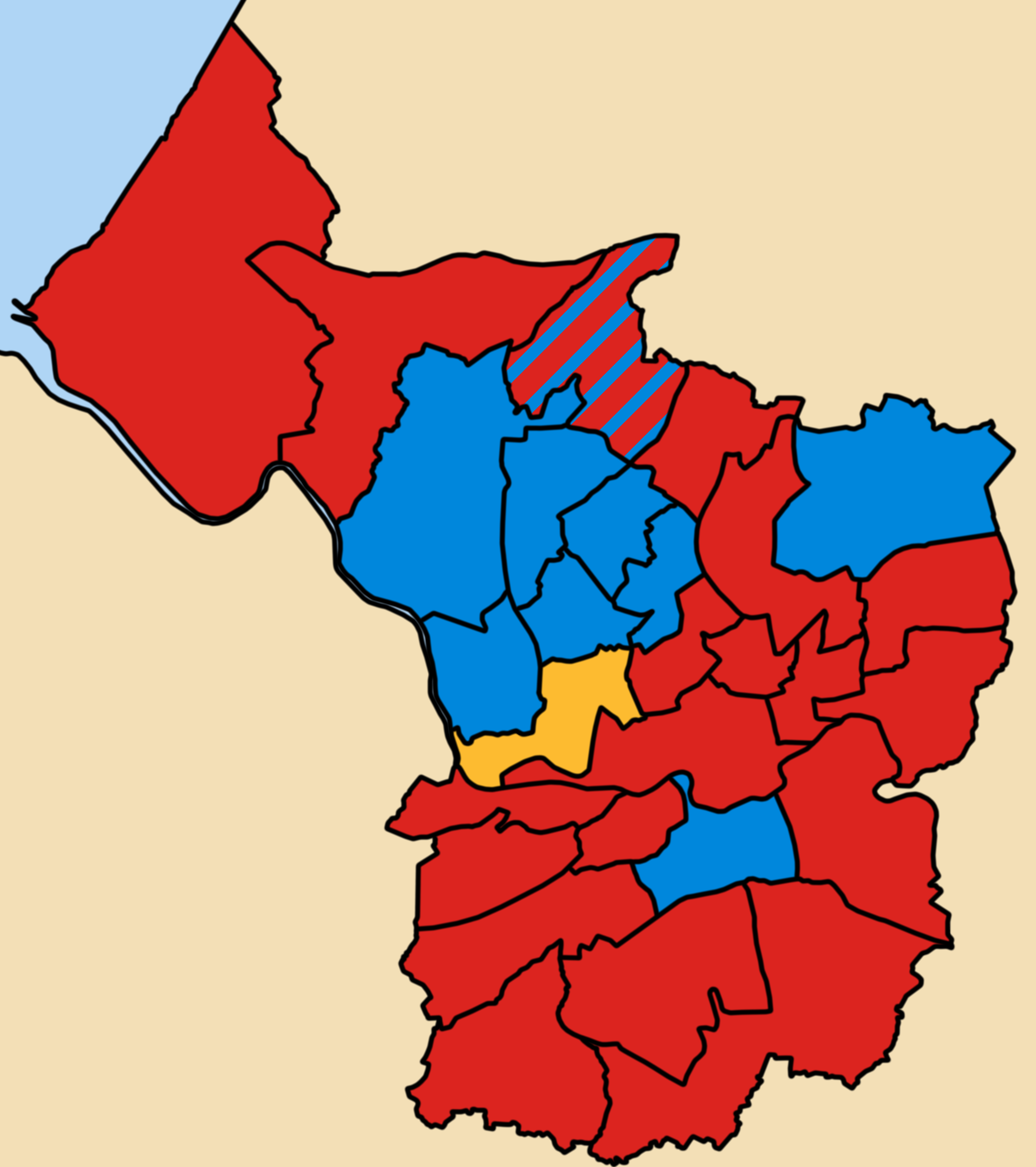
1973 local election results in Bristol

The 1973 Bristol City Council election took place on 7 June 1973 to elect members of Bristol City Council in England. This was on the same day as other local elections. Voting took place across 28 wards, each electing 3 Councillors. Following the Local Government Act 1972, this was the first election to the new non-metropolitan district council for Bristol, which came into being on 1 April the following year. Labour took control of the Council after winning a comfortable majority of seats.

The National Front stood in four wards in this election

== Ward results ==
=== Avon ===
Avon
Party	Candidate	Votes	%	±%
Labour	V Pople	2,786		
Labour	J Ellis	2,684		
Labour	J Britton	2,459		
Conservative	R Banfield	1,025		
Conservative	J Henley	961		
Conservative	J Taylor	948		
Communist	D Pratt	266		
Majority				
Labour win (new seat)				
Labour win (new seat)				
Labour win (new seat)				

=== Bedminster ===
Bedminster
Party	Candidate	Votes	%	±%
Labour	A Hillman	1,322		
Labour	J Wood	1,174		
Labour	H McKay	1,120		
Independent	M Bidgood	996		
Conservative	I Gillard	652		
Conservative	C Taylor	636		
Conservative	I Dawson	620		
Independent	J Rowe	459		
Independent	N Juliff	453		
National Front	D Hales	266		
Majority				
Labour win (new seat)				
Labour win (new seat)				
Labour win (new seat)				

=== Bishopston ===
Bishopston
Party	Candidate	Votes	%	±%
Conservative	D Topham	1,626		
Conservative	T Clarke	1,525		
Conservative	M Withers	1,518		
Liberal	K Tucker	723		
Liberal	A Cook	658		
Labour	S Cullard	613		
Labour	P McLaren	606		
Liberal	D Burrows	602		
Labour	M Wood	565		
Majority				
Conservative win (new seat)				
Conservative win (new seat)				
Conservative win (new seat)				

=== Bishopsworth ===
Bishopsworth
Party	Candidate	Votes	%	±%
Labour	L Smith	1,938		
Labour	R Morris	1,872		
Labour	A Munroe	1,842		
Independent	D Street	855		
Independent	R Rowe	819		
Independent	S Juliffe	733		
Communist	B Poole	153		
Communist	D Watson	128		
Majority				
Labour win (new seat)				
Labour win (new seat)				
Labour win (new seat)				

=== Brislington ===
Brislington
Party	Candidate	Votes	%	±%
Labour	K Legg	1,919		
Labour	H Skeates	1,781		
Labour	G Holmes	1,779		
Conservative	O Scantlebury	1,604		
Conservative	T Bray	1,593		
Conservative	P Elliott	1,465		
Majority				
Labour win (new seat)				
Labour win (new seat)				
Labour win (new seat)				

=== Cabot ===
Cabot
Party	Candidate	Votes	%	±%
Liberal	G Ferguson	1,075		
Liberal	W Watts-Miller	1,036		
Liberal	G Beedell	1,034		
Labour	F Brown	883		
Conservative	P Maggs	834		
Conservative	P Patemoster	792		
Conservative	G Woodhouse	756		
Labour	A Kimpton	703		
Labour	E Malos	696		
Majority				
Liberal win (new seat)				
Liberal win (new seat)				
Liberal win (new seat)				

=== Clifton ===
Clifton
Party	Candidate	Votes	%	±%
Conservative	J Lloyd-Kirk	1,623		
Conservative	T Girling	1,601		
Conservative	H Lawson	1,571		
Liberal	A Hodges	716		
Liberal	M Perkins	689		
Labour	F Inglis	684		
Labour	J Donovan	643		
Labour	M Thomas	511		
Communist	M Beardon	184		
Majority				
Conservative win (new seat)				
Conservative win (new seat)				
Conservative win (new seat)				

=== District ===
District
Party	Candidate	Votes	%	±%
Conservative	F Apperley	1,462		
Conservative	J Bosdet	1,456		
Conservative	R Trench	1,447		
Labour	J Malos	1,094		
Labour	P Phillips	1,087		
Labour	G Micklewright	1,063		
Majority				
Conservative win (new seat)				
Conservative win (new seat)				
Conservative win (new seat)				

=== Durdham ===
Durdham
Party	Candidate	Votes	%	±%
Conservative	G Palmer	2,650		
Conservative	G Browne	2,525		
Conservative	P Berrill	2,473		
Liberal	G Beddoes	958		
Liberal	E Mallett	876		
Labour	D Blackman	591		
Labour	E Holland	575		
Labour	M Smith	526		
Majority				
Conservative win (new seat)				
Conservative win (new seat)				
Conservative win (new seat)				

=== Easton ===
Easton
Party	Candidate	Votes	%	±%
Labour	J Jones	1,205		
Labour	G Maggs	1,183		
Labour	W Jenkins	1,076		
Conservative	S Russell	341		
Communist	N Carey	135		
Majority				
Labour win (new seat)				
Labour win (new seat)				
Labour win (new seat)				

=== Eastville ===
Eastville
Party	Candidate	Votes	%	±%
Labour	E Fothergill	1,561		
Labour	W Williams	1,560		
Labour	B Ross	1,451		
Conservative	E Macdonald	918		
Conservative	A Thomas	905		
Conservative	M Bessant	857		
Liberal	A Chalmers	807		
Liberal	S Clements	618		
Liberal	B Payton	572		
Majority				
Labour win (new seat)				
Labour win (new seat)				
Labour win (new seat)				

=== Henbury ===
Henbury
Party	Candidate	Votes	%	±%
Labour	J Fisk	2,989		
Labour	D Large	2,762		
Labour	G Brass	2,664		
Conservative	D Evans	2,480		
Conservative	W Lippiatt	2,456		
Conservative	R Biggs	2,396		
Majority				
Labour win (new seat)				
Labour win (new seat)				
Labour win (new seat)				

=== Hengrove ===
Hengrove
Party	Candidate	Votes	%	±%
Labour	W Graves	1,950		
Labour	A Abrams	1,774		
Labour	M Houlihan	1,510		
Conservative	G Bridcut	619		
Majority				
Labour win (new seat)				
Labour win (new seat)				
Labour win (new seat)				

=== Hillfields ===
Hillfields
Party	Candidate	Votes	%	±%
Labour	C Draper	1,985		
Labour	F Vyvyan-Jones	1,915		
Labour	R Thomas	1,871		
Conservative	D Thompson	1,032		
Conservative	C Baker	996		
Conservative	P Haines	983		
Majority				
Labour win (new seat)				
Labour win (new seat)				
Labour win (new seat)				

=== Horfield ===
Horfield
Party	Candidate	Votes	%	±%
Labour	C Merrett	2,467		
Labour	R Edwards	2,400		
Labour	R Hewlett	2,360		
Conservative	B Topham	2,063		
Conservative	D Macduff	1,893		
Conservative	R Wookey	1,762		
Majority				
Labour win (new seat)				
Labour win (new seat)				
Labour win (new seat)				

=== Knowle ===
Knowle
Party	Candidate	Votes	%	±%
Conservative	G Sprackling	1,800		
Conservative	E Wright	1,685		
Conservative	F Lawrence	1,556		
Labour	G Sheppard	973		
Labour	G England	953		
Labour	G Cole	912		
Liberal	D Beaven	590		
Majority				
Conservative win (new seat)				
Conservative win (new seat)				
Conservative win (new seat)				

=== Redland ===
Redland
Party	Candidate	Votes	%	±%
Conservative	C Hebblethwaite	1,528		
Conservative	G Keeley	1,516		
Conservative	G Hebblethwaite	1,506		
Liberal	J Ord	849		
Liberal	C Sara	840		
Liberal	C Ord	816		
Labour	M Merrett	450		
Labour	C Langham	448		
Labour	R Langley	421		
Majority				
Conservative win (new seat)				
Conservative win (new seat)				
Conservative win (new seat)				

=== Somerset ===
Somerset
Party	Candidate	Votes	%	±%
Labour	H Willcox	1,465		
Labour	D Jackson	1,366		
Labour	J Comerford	1,149		
Conservative	V Goodland	722		
Conservative	J Finnimore	562		
National Front	P Thomas	424		
Majority				
Labour win (new seat)				
Labour win (new seat)				
Labour win (new seat)				

=== Southmead ===
Southmead
Party	Candidate	Votes	%	±%
Labour	J Hole	1,987		
Conservative	F McGough	1,931		
Labour	S Grace	1,848		
Labour	R Bridle	1,801		
Conservative	T Wetherall	1,779		
Conservative	I Hamilton	1,779		
Ind. Conservative	G Chappell	900		
Majority				
Labour win (new seat)				
Conservative win (new seat)				
Labour win (new seat)				

=== Southville ===
Southville
Party	Candidate	Votes	%	±%
Labour	F Smith	1,336		
Labour	F Pidgeon	1,260		
Labour	M Young	1,202		
Conservative	W Blackmore	1,061		
Conservative	L White	907		
Conservative	P Barnwell	876		
Majority				
Labour win (new seat)				
Labour win (new seat)				
Labour win (new seat)				

=== St George East ===
St George East
Party	Candidate	Votes	%	±%
Labour	H Bloom	1,855		
Labour	L Rexworthy	1,798		
Labour	D Beer	1,779		
Conservative	K Mountstephen	1,143		
Conservative	E Cockrell	1,109		
Conservative	F Stockham	1,027		
Majority				
Labour win (new seat)				
Labour win (new seat)				
Labour win (new seat)				

=== St George West ===
St George West
Party	Candidate	Votes	%	±%
Labour	I Rogers	1,128		
Labour	J McLaren	1,111		
Labour	M Rea	1,088		
Liberal	V Hales	591		
Liberal	A Chalmers	515		
Conservative	I Beddoe	475		
Liberal	D Seymour	468		
National Front	A Nelmes	238		
Majority				
Labour win (new seat)				
Labour win (new seat)				
Labour win (new seat)				

=== St Paul ===
St Paul
Party	Candidate	Votes	%	±%
Labour	D McLaren	1,045		
Labour	G Fowler	995		
Labour	A Norton	989		
Conservative	T Mort-Williams	507		
Majority				
Labour win (new seat)				
Labour win (new seat)				
Labour win (new seat)				

=== St Philip & Jacob ===
St Philip & Jacob
Party	Candidate	Votes	%	±%
Labour	I Knight	766		
Labour	L Lane	759		
Labour	A Pegler	754		
Conservative	J Douglas-Green	292		
Majority				
Labour win (new seat)				
Labour win (new seat)				
Labour win (new seat)				

=== Stapleton ===
Stapleton
Party	Candidate	Votes	%	±%
Conservative	P Brook	2,530		
Conservative	T Whiteley	2,444		
Conservative	H Williams	2,397		
Labour	G Bee	2,080		
Labour	E Skuse	2,015		
Labour	R Denyer	1,980		
Majority				
Conservative win (new seat)				
Conservative win (new seat)				
Conservative win (new seat)				

=== Stockwood ===
Stockwood
Party	Candidate	Votes	%	±%
Labour	G Easton	2,888		
Labour	V Bath	2,796		
Labour	D Poole	2,757		
Conservative	G Barrow	2,558		
Conservative	J Howe	2,525		
Conservative	R Huxham	2,300		
Liberal	J Phillips	778		
Majority				
Labour win (new seat)				
Labour win (new seat)				
Labour win (new seat)				

=== Westbury-on-Trym ===
Westbury-on-Trym
Party	Candidate	Votes	%	±%
Conservative	R Wall	3,995		
Conservative	D Poole	3,950		
Conservative	C Alderson	3,813		
Liberal	C Everett	1,878		
Liberal	E David	1,749		
Liberal	N Fern	1,520		
Labour	M Waddington	631		
Labour	G Waddington	627		
Labour	R Willis	614		
Majority				
Conservative win (new seat)				
Conservative win (new seat)				
Conservative win (new seat)				

=== Windmill Hill ===
Windmill Hill
Party	Candidate	Votes	%	±%
Labour	B Richards	1,136		
Labour	C Roberston	1,022		
Labour	R Wilmott	1,009		
Conservative	D Watkins	537		
Conservative	R Douglas-Green	491		
National Front	R Bale	326		
Majority				
Labour win (new seat)				
Labour win (new seat)				
Labour win (new seat)				
