= 1983 Bristol City Council election =

1983 UK local government election

← 1979	5 May 1983	1984 →

All 68 seats to Bristol City Council 35 seats needed for a majority
	First party	Second party	Third party
Party	Conservative	Labour	Alliance
Seats won	32	30	6
Council control before election
Labour Party (UK)
Council control after election
No Overall Control

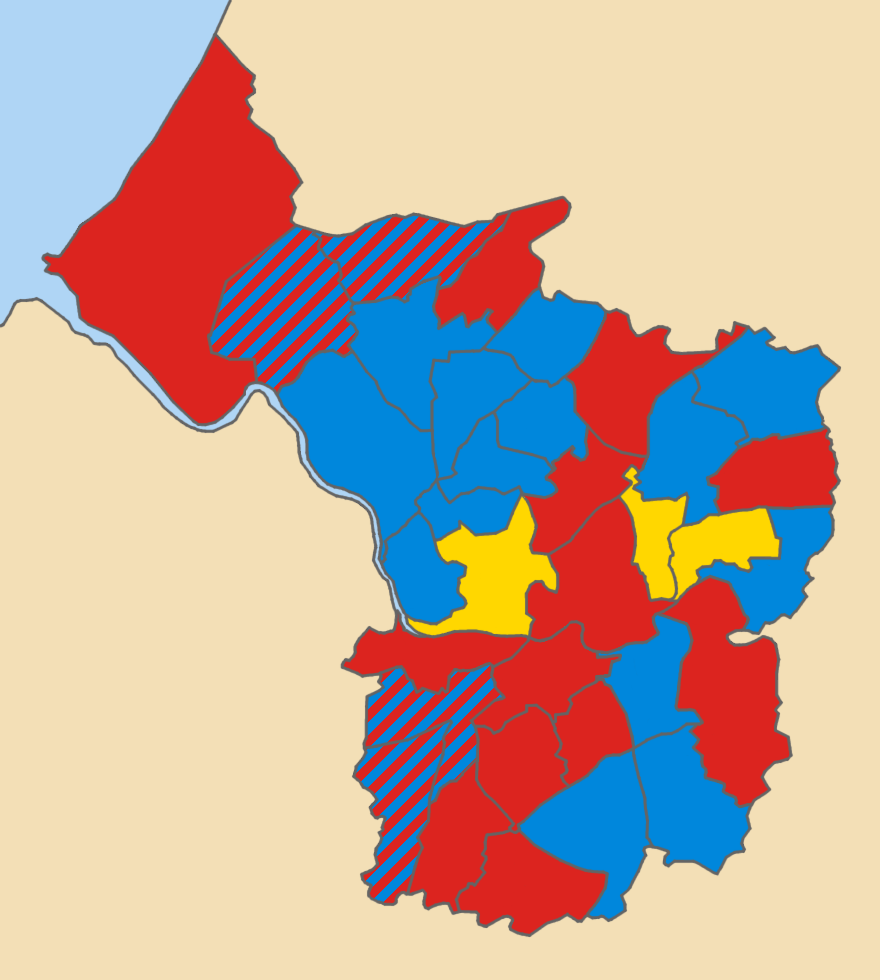
1983 local election results in Bristol

The 1983 Bristol City Council election took place on 5 May 1983 to elect members of Bristol City Council in England. This was on the same day as other local elections. All seats were up for election, two seats in every ward, due to the introduction of new ward boundaries. Therefore, direct comparisons with previous elections are not possible. Majority is the number of votes separating the 2nd and 3rd candidates. Alliance candidates who were Liberals are described as such. No party had an overall majority; as the largest party the Conservatives formed a minority administration.

== Ward results ==
=== Ashley ===
Ashley
Party	Candidate	Votes	%	±%
Labour	K.A. Bassett	2,060	51.8	
Labour	M.J. Shotter	1,880		
Conservative	C.M. O'Leary	1,091	27.4	
Conservative	B.J. Mitchell	1,089		
Liberal	J.J. Errington	477	12.0	
Alliance	M.F. Pratt	372		
Ecology	J.S. Jameson	188	4.7	
Communist	V. Ralph	163	4.1	
Majority		789		

=== Avonmouth ===
Avonmouth
Party	Candidate	Votes	%	±%
Labour	V.W. Pople	2,184	50.5	
Labour	A. Crowley	2,147		
Conservative	W.T. Lippiatt	1,512	34.9	
Conservative	S.M. Tanner	1,462		
Alliance	M.C. Brown	632	14.6	
Alliance	C.F. Slater	617		
Majority		635		

=== Bedminster ===
Bedminster
Party	Candidate	Votes	%	±%
Conservative	I.P. Gillard	1,888	45.9	
Labour	A.E. Hillman	1,734	42.2	
Conservative	J.M. Fey	1,731		
Labour	J.E. Wood	1,729		
Alliance	P.P. Hoare	489	11.9	
Alliance	R.M. Kirkham	477		
Majority		3		

=== Bishopston ===
Bishopston
Party	Candidate	Votes	%	±%
Conservative	D. Topham	2,265	42.6	
Conservative	M.C. Withers	2,164		
Labour	H. Bashforth	1,658	31.2	
Labour	M.C. Georghiou	1,628		
Liberal	A.M. Carter	1,201	22.6	
Alliance	S.V. Spilsbury	1,134		
Ecology	A. Clarke	196	3.7	
Majority		506		

=== Bishopsworth ===
Bishopsworth
Party	Candidate	Votes	%	±%
Conservative	V.E. Goodland	1,342	43.0	
Labour	D.M. Jackson	1,265	40.6	
Labour	J.R.G. Comerford	1,254		
Conservative	D.E. Humphry	1,151		
Alliance	C.M. Sharland	511	16.4	
Alliance	V.P. Thomas	420		
Majority		11		

=== Brislington East ===
Brislington East
Party	Candidate	Votes	%	±%
Labour	D.R. Parsons	2,020	40.9	
Labour	C.C. Reid	1,792		
Conservative	R.J. Wynne	1,704	34.5	
Conservative	T.W. Bray	1,648		
Independent Labour	K.P. Legg	698	14.1	
Alliance	P.J. Gingell	519	10.5	
Alliance	J.W. Hale	404		
Majority		88		

=== Brislington West ===
Brislington West
Party	Candidate	Votes	%	±%
Conservative	M.M. Lippitt	2,008	45.7	
Conservative	O.B. Scantlebury	1,973		
Labour	G.E. Maggs	1,221	27.8	
Labour	C.L. Orlik	1,170		
Alliance	B.G. Clarke	1,163	26.5	
Alliance	R.T. Parsons	1,127		
Majority		752		

=== Cabot ===
Cabot
Party	Candidate	Votes	%	±%
Alliance	R.J. Howell	1,642	43.1	
Alliance	I.H. Dunn	1,515		
Conservative	T.V. Barrington	1,256	33.0	
Conservative	B.C. Hubble	1,190		
Labour	M.P. Broussine	752	19.7	
Ecology	M. McClelland	160	4.2	
Majority		259		

=== Clifton ===
Clifton
Party	Candidate	Votes	%	±%
Conservative	J.R. Kerridge	2,062	44.6	
Conservative	J. Lloyd-Kirk	2,014		
Alliance	J.F. Gray	1,644	35.5	
Alliance	R.A. Smith	1,595		
Labour	A.E. Thomas	808	17.5	
Labour	K.K. Anand	696		
Clock Party	N. Fox	111	2.4	
Clock Party	N. Tubbs	72		
Majority		370		

=== Cotham ===
Cotham
Party	Candidate	Votes	%	±%
Conservative	G. Hebblethwaite	1,931	43.5	
Conservative	W.E. Blackmore	1,722		
Liberal	G. Box	1,478	33.3	
Liberal	N.A. Winch	1,372		
Labour	A.W. MacCallum	804	18.1	
Labour	A.M. Thyer	763		
Ecology	C.A. Rose	222	5.0	
Majority		244		

=== Easton ===
Easton
Party	Candidate	Votes	%	±%
Liberal	S.R. Comer	1,965	50.5	
Liberal	J.F. Kiely	1,907		
Labour	J.H. King	1,309	33.6	
Labour	D. McLaren	1,187		
Conservative	I.D. Millard	535	13.7	
Conservative	J.M. Short	498		
Communist	D.E. Esbester	83	2.1	
Majority		598		

=== Eastville ===
Eastville
Party	Candidate	Votes	%	±%
Conservative	J.A. Vowles	1,821	42.3	
Conservative	D.A. Fey	1,732		
Labour	W.G. Williams	1,379	32.0	
Labour	R.A. Fehler	1,147		
Alliance	P. Hawkesworth	1,019	23.7	
Alliance	P.H. Main	894		
Ecology	G.A. Dorey	88	2.0	
Majority		353		

=== Filwood ===
Filwood
Party	Candidate	Votes	%	±%
Labour	V.J. Hicks	1,703	70.9	
Labour	W.W. Jenkins	1,488		
Conservative	M. MacDonald	425	17.7	
Conservative	P.J. Sidebottom	293		
Liberal	A. Elkan	212	8.8	
Liberal	A.F. Ryder	205		
Communist	A. Chester	61	2.5	
Majority		1,063		

=== Frome Vale ===
Frome Vale
Party	Candidate	Votes	%	±%
Conservative	K.I. Blanchard	2,040	41.9	
Conservative	J.M. Bosdet	1,951		
Labour	C.I. Rust	1,893	38.9	
Labour	E.G. Skuse	1,825		
Alliance	R.H. Long	934	19.2	
Alliance	S.D. Long	797		
Majority		58		

=== Hartcliffe ===
Hartcliffe
Party	Candidate	Votes	%	±%
Labour	F.H. Pidgeon	1,701	50.4	
Labour	B.B. Richards	1,632		
Conservative	L.E. Vann	990	29.3	
Conservative	K.P. Godden	982		
Alliance	R.T. Rowe	685	20.3	
Alliance	R.S. Sharland	670		
Majority		642		

=== Henbury ===
Henbury
Party	Candidate	Votes	%	±%
Labour	J.D. Fisk	2,046	45.1	
Conservative	P.G. Gollop	1,906	42.0	
Conservative	P.B. Evans	1,899		
Labour	G.M. Head	1,640		
Alliance	R.A. Coombs	585	12.9	
Alliance	P.H. Cole	521		
Majority		7		

=== Hengrove ===
Hengrove
Party	Candidate	Votes	%	±%
Conservative	A.J. Telling	2,370	53.2	
Conservative	S.C. Williams	2,354		
Labour	A.B. Abrams	1,544	34.6	
Labour	J.M. Smith	1,496		
Alliance	M.C. Blundell	545	12.2	
Alliance	R.M. Virgo	518		
Majority		810		

=== Henleaze ===
Henleaze
Party	Candidate	Votes	%	±%
Conservative	G.J. Browne	3,221	65.8	
Conservative	P. Paternoster	3,106		
Liberal	D.N. Clarke	1,117	22.8	
Liberal	B.J. Blanchard	1,094		
Labour	R. Chamberlain	558	11.4	
Labour	M.D. Vokins	538		
Majority		1,989		

=== Hillfields ===
Hillfields
Party	Candidate	Votes	%	±%
Labour	G.R. Robertson	1,672	47.7	
Labour	J.D. Naysmith	1,641		
Conservative	J.D. Seville	1,203	34.3	
Conservative	R.C. Walker	1,099		
Liberal	J.S. Wright	631	18.0	
Liberal	A.J. Humphrey	624		
Majority		438		

=== Horfield ===
Horfield
Party	Candidate	Votes	%	±%
Conservative	B.J.D. Topham	2,330	44.5	
Conservative	F.J. Apperley	2,229		
Alliance	C. Boney	1,677	32.0	
Alliance	P.J. Hurford	1,487		
Labour	I.M. Knight	1,158	22.1	
Labour	T. Morgan	1,137		
Ecology	C.S. Jameson	73	1.4	
Majority		552		

=== Kingsweston ===
Kingsweston
Party	Candidate	Votes	%	±%
Labour	T.R. Thomas	1,868	46.2	
Conservative	R. Mellor	1,619	40.0	
Labour	A.E. Tudball	1,607		
Conservative	S.F. Gorringe	1,437		
Alliance	J.G. Miller	556	13.8	
Alliance	A.D. West	547		
Majority		12		

=== Knowle ===
Knowle
Party	Candidate	Votes	%	±%
Labour	A. Munroe	1,420	46.1	
Labour	J. McLaren	1,287		
Conservative	G. Bridcut	1,260	40.9	
Conservative	S. Roberts	1,109		
Alliance	S.E. Bateman	403	13.1	
Alliance	G. Taylor	371		
Majority		27		

=== Lawrence Hill ===
Lawrence Hill
Party	Candidate	Votes	%	±%
Labour	J. Jones	2,329	66.4	
Labour	D.B. Tedder	1,987		
Conservative	G.H.W. Woodhouse	618	17.6	
Conservative	S.C. Trench	616		
Alliance	J.R. McCullough	558	15.9	
Alliance	A.W.J. Wilcox	520		
Majority		1,369		

=== Lockleaze ===
Lockleaze
Party	Candidate	Votes	%	±%
Labour	C.E. Merrett	1,922	49.0	
Labour	J. Hynes	1,726		
Conservative	D. MacFarlane	1,026	26.2	
Conservative	J.E.V. Henley	989		
Alliance	H.L. Myers	973	24.8	
Alliance	P.T. Nagle	762		
Majority		700		

=== Redland ===
Redland
Party	Candidate	Votes	%	±%
Conservative	T.M. Allen	2,491	52.8	
Conservative	R.S. Trench	2,429		
Alliance	J. Freeland	1,019	21.6	
Alliance	R.C. Westbury-Jones	901		
Labour	R.J. Ritchie	869	18.4	
Labour	S.J. Sims	826		
Ecology	T.R. Leegwater	338	7.2	
Majority		1,410		

=== St George East ===
St. George East
Party	Candidate	Votes	%	±%
Conservative	K.M. Mountstephen	1,773	46.7	
Conservative	R.E. King	1,627		
Labour	P.W. Hammond	1,504	39.6	
Labour	G. Bee	1,402		
Alliance	J.A. Hoddell	521	13.7	
Alliance	G.G. Morgan	491		
Majority		123		

=== St George West ===
St. George West
Party	Candidate	Votes	%	±%
Liberal	R.G.H. Lewis	1,414	41.2	
Liberal	J. Myers	1,256		
Labour	J. McLaren	1,210	35.2	
Labour	D.P. Beer	1,168		
Conservative	A.L. Blevins-Walker	810	23.6	
Conservative	M.E.C. Stump	732		
Majority		46		

=== Southmead ===
Southmead
Party	Candidate	Votes	%	±%
Labour	B. Begley	1,757	50.0	
Labour	D.L. Hughes	1,750		
Conservative	D.W. Dowling	1,288	36.6	
Conservative	I.D.G. Roberts	1,190		
Liberal	G.R. Beddoes	471	13.4	
Liberal	M.J. Turner	447		
Majority		462		

=== Southville ===
Southville
Party	Candidate	Votes	%	±%
Labour	A.J. May	2,088	45.9	
Labour	R.W. Walthon	1,928		
Conservative	R.S. Merriott	1,566	34.4	
Conservative	T.J. Skipp	1,542		
Alliance	A.M. Mason	781	17.2	
Alliance	J.R. Osborne	677		
Ecology	G. Pollard	112	2.5	
Majority		362		

=== Stockwood ===
Stockwood
Party	Candidate	Votes	%	±%
Conservative	M.A. Stamper	2,666	51.3	
Conservative	C.J. Williams	2,618		
Labour	I. Douglas	1,867	35.9	
Labour	J.A. Patterson	1,812		
Liberal	R.I. Johnson	661	12.7	
Alliance	M.V. Pipping	490		
Majority		751		

=== Stoke Bishop ===
Stoke Bishop
Party	Candidate	Votes	%	±%
Conservative	P.J. Abraham	3,705	67.5	
Conservative	C.D.M.B. Alderson	3,667		
Alliance	P.V. Griew	846	15.4	
Liberal	J.F. Farrand	838		
Labour	M.I. Waddington	728	13.3	
Labour	R.G. Moss	693		
Ecology	G.A.R. Sawday	212	3.9	
Majority		2,821		

=== Westbury-on-Trym ===
Westbury-on-Trym
Party	Candidate	Votes	%	±%
Conservative	D.H. Poole	3,884	73.3	
Conservative	R.W. Wall	3,788		
Liberal	M.C. Hamilton	781	14.7	
Alliance	E. Jacobs	728		
Labour	D.V. Evans	551	10.4	
Labour	A.N. Gillett	542		
Ecology	A.C. Hosegood	82	1.5	
Majority		3,007		

=== Whitchurch Park ===
Whitchurch Park
Party	Candidate	Votes	%	±%
Labour	H.W.M. Willcox	1,783	55.8	
Labour	C. Draper	1,353		
Conservative	E.M. MacDonald	874	27.3	
Conservative	M.B. Tellford Beasley	825		
Alliance	J.C. Cassidy	541	16.9	
Alliance	J.A. Rowe	535		
Majority		479		

=== Windmill Hill ===
Windmill Hill
Party	Candidate	Votes	%	±%
Labour	G. Micklewright	2,445	50.0	
Labour	P. Tatlow	2,373		
Conservative	W.R. Biggs	1,711	35.0	
Conservative	P.L. Roberts	1,634		
Alliance	A.F. Akerman	738	15.1	
Alliance	F. Thomas	737		
Majority		662		

== Sources ==
- Bristol Evening Post 6 May 1983
