= 1984 Bristol City Council election =

1984 UK local government election

← 1983	3 May 1984	1986 →

23 of 68 seats (one third) to Bristol City Council 35 seats needed for a majority
	First party	Second party	Third party
Party	Labour	Conservative	Alliance
Seats won	33	29	6
Seat change	▲3	▼3	Steady
Council control before election
No Overall Control
Council control after election
No Overall Control

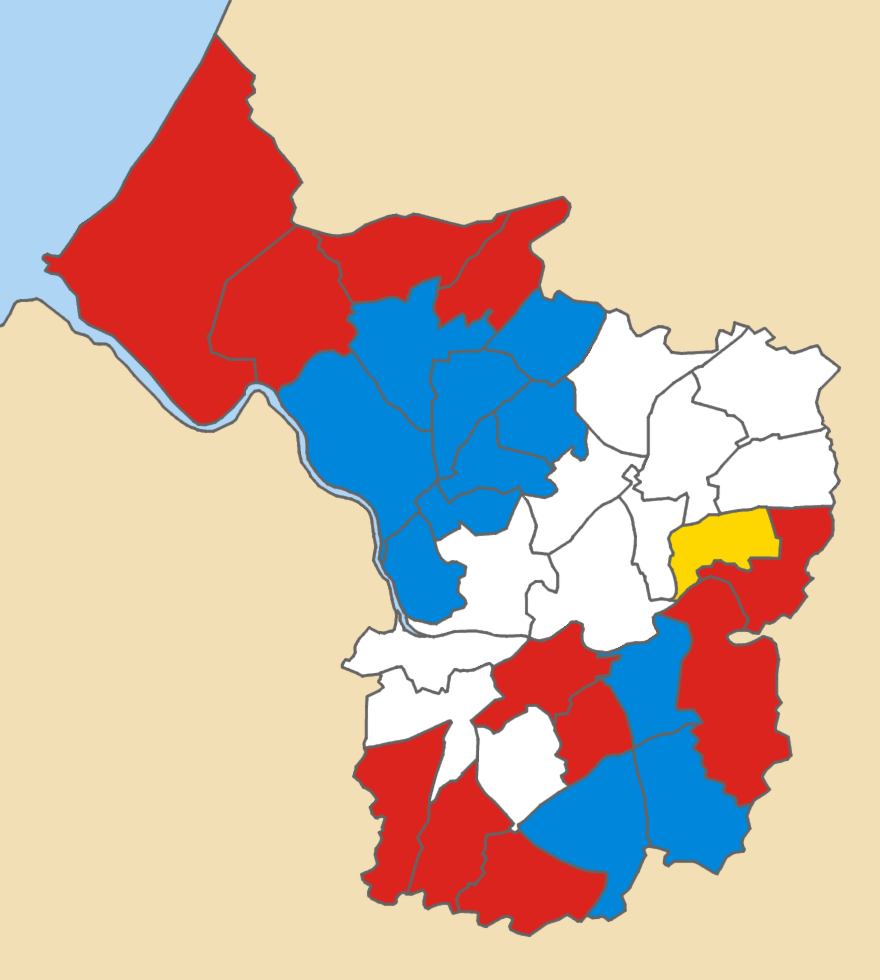
1984 local election results in Bristol

The 1984 Bristol City Council election took place on 3 May 1984 to elect members of Bristol City Council in England. This was on the same day as other local elections. In this election, one-third of seats were up for election. There was a general but small swing from Conservative to Labour. Labour regained their position as the largest party and took minority control of the Council.

== Ward results ==
The change is calculated using the 1983 election results.

=== Avonmouth ===
Avonmouth
Party	Candidate	Votes	%	±%
Labour	A. Crowley	2,400	57.7	+7.2
Conservative	S. Morris	1,347	32.4	−2.5
Alliance	M. Brown	373	9.0	−5.6
Ecology	A. Bradstock	41	1.0	+1.0
Majority		1,053	25.3	
Labour hold		Swing	+4.9	

=== Bishopston ===
Bishopston
Party	Candidate	Votes	%	±%
Conservative	M. Withers	1,794	37.6	−5.0
Labour	H. Bashforth	1,735	36.4	+5.2
Liberal	P. Nagle	1,139	23.9	+1.3
Ecology	A. Clarke	101	2.1	−1.6
Majority		59	1.2	
Conservative hold		Swing	-5.1	

=== Bishopsworth ===
Bishopsworth
Party	Candidate	Votes	%	±%
Labour	D. Jackson	1,312	48.5	+7.9
Conservative	W. Goodland	1,137	42.0	−1.0
Alliance	M. Norman	229	8.5	−7.9
Ecology	M. Pitt	29	1.1	+1.1
Majority		175	6.5	
Labour hold		Swing	+4.5	

=== Brislington East ===
Brislington East
Party	Candidate	Votes	%	±%
Labour	C. Reid	2,470	55.1	+14.2
Conservative	R. Wynne	1,421	31.7	−2.8
Liberal	R. Parsons	558	12.5	+2.0
Ecology	G. Dorey	30	0.7	+0.7
Majority		1,049	23.4	
Labour hold		Swing	+8.1	

=== Brislington West ===
Brislington West
Party	Candidate	Votes	%	±%
Conservative	O. Scantlebury	1,585	36.1	−9.6
Liberal	B. Clarke	1,505	34.3	+7.8
Labour	J. Smith	1,250	28.5	+0.7
Ecology	P. Tonkin	46	1.0	+1.0
Majority		80	1.8	
Conservative hold		Swing	-8.7	

=== Clifton ===
Clifton
Party	Candidate	Votes	%	±%
Conservative	J. Lloyd-Kirk	1,767	45.0	+0.4
Liberal	J. Gray	1,486	37.9	+2.4
Labour	C. Woods	537	13.7	−3.8
Ecology	J. Scott	133	3.4	+3.4
Majority		281	7.1	
Conservative hold		Swing	-1.0	

=== Cotham ===
Cotham
Party	Candidate	Votes	%	±%
Conservative	W. Blackmore	1,680	43.9	+0.4
Liberal	G. Box	1,355	35.4	+2.1
Labour	S. Sims	652	17.0	−1.1
Ecology	G. Collard	143	3.7	−1.3
Majority		325	8.5	
Conservative hold		Swing	-0.9	

=== Hartcliffe ===
Hartcliffe
Party	Candidate	Votes	%	±%
Labour	B. Richards	1,495	54.5	+4.1
Conservative	R. Hodges	790	28.8	−0.5
Alliance	R. Sharland	418	15.2	−5.1
Ecology	R. Martin	40	1.5	+1.5
Majority		705	25.7	
Labour hold		Swing	+2.3	

=== Henbury ===
Henbury
Party	Candidate	Votes	%	±%
Labour	J. Patterson	1,871	43.4	−1.7
Conservative	P. Gollop	1,861	43.1	+1.1
Alliance	R. Coombs	546	12.7	−0.2
Ecology	E. Lyon	36	0.8	+0.8
Majority		10	0.3	
Labour gain from Conservative		Swing	-1.4	

=== Hengrove ===
Hengrove
Party	Candidate	Votes	%	±%
Conservative	S. Williams	2,145	53.6	+0.4
Labour	P. Roberts	1,728	43.1	+8.5
Ecology	D. Long	132	3.3	+3.3
Majority		417	10.5	
Conservative hold		Swing	-4.1	

=== Henleaze ===
Henleaze
Party	Candidate	Votes	%	±%
Conservative	J. Fey	3,081	76.2	+10.4
Labour	M. Vokins	663	16.4	+5.0
Ecology	R. Savage	300	7.4	+7.4
Majority		2,418	59.8	
Conservative hold		Swing	+2.7	

=== Horfield ===
Horfield
Party	Candidate	Votes	%	±%
Conservative	F. Apperley	1,924	40.5	−4.0
Liberal	C. Boney	1,770	37.2	+5.2
Labour	J. McLaren	1,032	21.7	−0.4
Ecology	J. Jameson	28	0.6	−0.8
Majority		154	3.3	
Conservative hold		Swing	-4.6	

=== Kingsweston ===
Kingsweston
Party	Candidate	Votes	%	±%
Labour	A. Tudball	1,862	45.3	−0.9
Conservative	R. Mellor	1,824	44.4	+4.4
Liberal	P. Bennett	371	9.0	−4.8
Ecology	C. Robinson	52	1.3	+1.3
Majority		38	0.9	
Labour gain from Conservative		Swing	-2.7	

=== Knowle ===
Knowle
Party	Candidate	Votes	%	±%
Labour	J. Clancy	2,126	58.2	+12.1
Conservative	T. Skipp	1,190	32.6	−8.3
Alliance	D. Usher	275	7.5	−5.6
Ecology	M. Corrigan	63	1.7	+1.7
Majority		936	25.6	
Labour hold		Swing	+10.2	

=== Redland ===
Redland
Party	Candidate	Votes	%	±%
Conservative	R. Trench	2,088	53.2	+0.4
Alliance	J. Freeland	847	21.6	0.0
Labour	T. Morgan	776	19.8	+1.4
Ecology	T. Leegwater	217	5.5	−1.7
Majority		1,241	31.6	
Conservative hold		Swing	+0.2	

=== St George East ===
St. George East
Party	Candidate	Votes	%	±%
Labour	P. Hammond	1,635	47.1	+7.5
Conservative	R. King	1,463	42.2	−4.5
Alliance	A. Sadiq	276	8.0	−5.7
Ecology	M. Weekes	96	2.8	+2.8
Majority		172	4.9	
Labour gain from Conservative		Swing	+6.0	

=== St George West ===
St. George West
Party	Candidate	Votes	%	±%
Liberal	J. Myers	1,576	44.9	+3.7
Labour	J. McLaren	1,184	33.7	−1.5
Conservative	P. Hole	738	21.0	−2.6
Ecology	A. Young	15	0.4	+0.4
Majority		392	11.2	
Liberal hold		Swing	+2.6	

=== Southmead ===
Southmead
Party	Candidate	Votes	%	±%
Labour	P. Knowland	1,931	56.8	+6.8
Conservative	D. Dowling	1,091	32.1	−4.5
Alliance	P. Cole	337	9.9	−3.5
Ecology	C. Jameson	40	1.2	+1.2
Majority		840	24.7	
Labour hold		Swing	+5.7	

=== Stockwood ===
Stockwood
Party	Candidate	Votes	%	±%
Conservative	C. Williams	2,250	45.1	−6.2
Labour	M. Broussine	2,009	40.3	+4.4
Liberal	R. Bingham	695	13.9	+1.2
Ecology	A. Hosegood	34	0.7	+0.7
Majority		241	4.8	
Conservative hold		Swing	-5.3	

=== Stoke Bishop ===
Stoke Bishop
Party	Candidate	Votes	%	±%
Conservative	C. Alderson	2,995	64.5	−3.0
Liberal	K. Purnell	939	20.2	+4.8
Labour	M. Waddington	523	11.3	−2.0
Ecology	C. Rose	189	4.1	+0.2
Majority		2,056	44.3	
Conservative hold		Swing	-3.9	

=== Westbury-on-Trym ===
Westbury-on-Trym
Party	Candidate	Votes	%	±%
Conservative	R. Wall	3,390	72.8	−0.5
Liberal	A. West	716	15.4	+0.7
Labour	R. Bridle	437	9.4	−1.0
Ecology	S. Powell	116	2.5	+1.0
Majority		2,674	57.4	
Conservative hold		Swing	-0.6	

=== Whitchurch Park ===
Whitchurch Park
Party	Candidate	Votes	%	±%
Labour	C. Draper	1,840	63.3	+7.5
Conservative	D. Rollings	783	26.9	−0.4
Alliance	A. Akerman	241	8.3	−8.6
Ecology	S. Woodhouse	43	1.5	+1.5
Majority		1,057	36.4	
Labour hold		Swing	+4.0	

=== Windmill Hill ===
Windmill Hill
Party	Candidate	Votes	%	±%
Labour	P. Tatlow	2,427	54.7	+4.7
Conservative	W. Biggs	1,432	32.3	−2.7
Alliance	J. Osborne	466	10.5	−4.6
Ecology	S. Campbell	111	2.5	+2.5
Majority		995	22.4	
Labour hold		Swing	+3.7	

== Sources ==
- Bristol Evening Post 6 May 1984
