= 1986 Bristol City Council election =

1986 UK local government election

← 1984	8 May 1986	1987 →

24 of 68 seats (one third) to Bristol City Council 35 seats needed for a majority
	First party	Second party	Third party
Party	Labour	Conservative	Alliance
Seats won	35	26	7
Seat change	▲2	▼3	▲1
Council control before election
No Overall Control
Council control after election
Labour Party (UK)

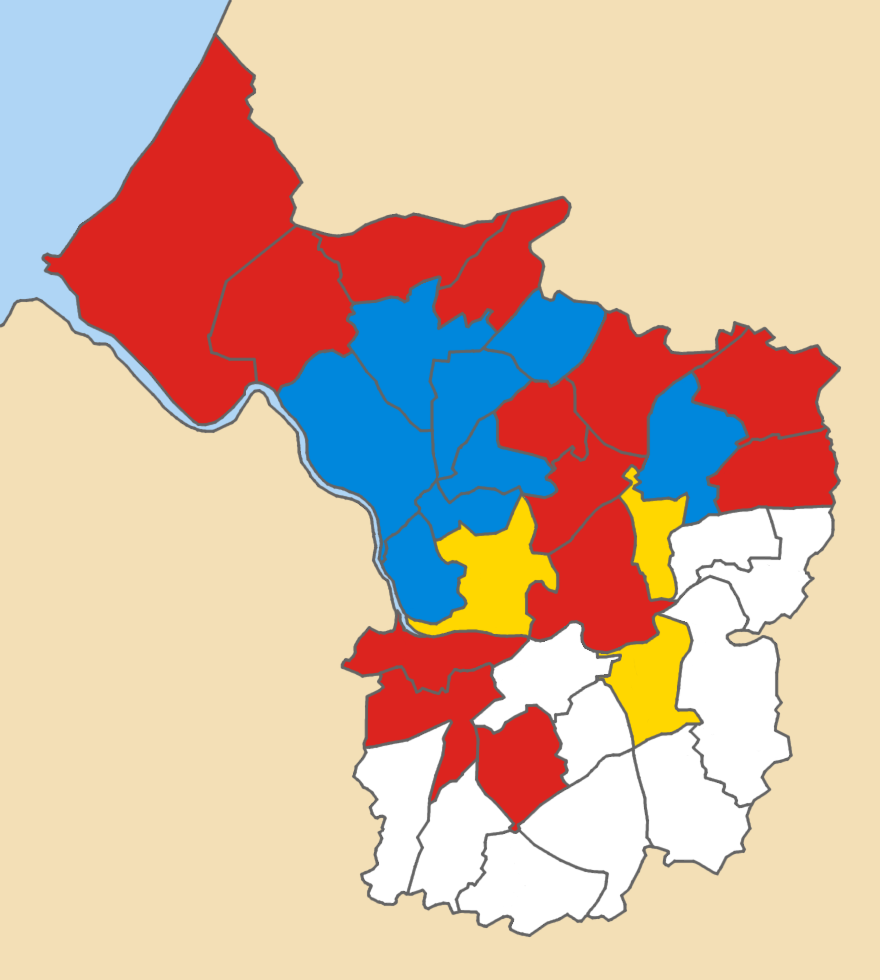
1986 local election results in Bristol

The 1986 Bristol City Council election took place on 8 May 1986 to elect members of Bristol City Council in England. This was on the same day as other local elections. One third of seats in the 1986 Council Elections in the English city of Bristol were up for election. The election in Brislington West was a by-election. There was a small swing away from the Conservatives and Labour regained a majority on the Council, which they kept until 2003.

== Ward results ==
The change is calculated using the 1983 election results.

=== Ashley ===
Ashley
Party	Candidate	Votes	%	±%
Labour	M. Shotter	2,035	60.4	+8.6
Conservative	R. Hodges	546	16.2	−11.2
Liberal	P. Davies	493	14.6	+2.6
Green	D. Bowering	200	5.9	+1.2
Revolutionary Communist	J. Walker	62	1.8	+1.8
Communist	D. Samson	33	1.0	−3.1
Majority		1,489	44.2	
Labour hold		Swing	+9.9	

=== Avonmouth ===
Avonmouth
Party	Candidate	Votes	%	±%
Labour	V. Pople	2,060	54.7	+4.2
Conservative	D. Pullin	1,124	29.9	−5.0
Alliance	M. Brown	525	13.9	−0.7
Green	R. Stanleigh	56	1.5	+1.5
Majority		936	24.8	
Labour hold		Swing	+4.6	

=== Bedminster ===
Bedminster
Party	Candidate	Votes	%	±%
Labour	C. Warren	1,765	42.1	−0.1
Conservative	W. Biggs	1,192	28.4	−17.5
Alliance	J. Osborne	1,181	28.1	+16.2
Green	M. Wood	59	1.4	+1.4
Majority		573	13.7	
Labour hold		Swing	+8.7	

=== Bishopston ===
Bishopston
Party	Candidate	Votes	%	±%
Labour	H. Bashforth	1,799	32.8	+1.6
Conservative	D. Topham	1,763	32.1	−10.5
Liberal	P. Nagle	1,755	32.0	+9.4
Green	M. Pitt	174	3.2	−0.5
Majority		36	0.7	
Labour gain from Conservative		Swing	+6.1	

=== Brislington West ===
Brislington West by-election
Party	Candidate	Votes	%	±%
Liberal	M. Langley	1,801	38.0	+11.5
Labour	J. Hillier	1,496	31.6	+3.8
Conservative	M. Weeks	1,380	29.1	−16.6
Green	B. Hussain	61	1.3	+1.3
Majority		305	6.4	
Liberal gain from Conservative		Swing	+14.1	

=== Cabot ===
Cabot
Party	Candidate	Votes	%	±%
Liberal	C. Boney	1,523	43.0	−0.1
Labour	J. Williams	954	26.9	+7.2
Conservative	R. Hay	880	24.8	−8.2
Green	G. Nicholas	187	5.3	+1.1
Majority		569	16.1	
Liberal hold		Swing	-3.7	

=== Clifton ===
Clifton
Party	Candidate	Votes	%	±%
Conservative	D. Rollings	1,751	37.5	−7.1
Liberal	P. Goggin	1,741	37.3	+1.8
Labour	Tony Robinson	958	20.5	+3.0
Green	A. Grant	214	4.6	+4.6
Majority		10	0.2	
Conservative hold		Swing	-4.5	

=== Cotham ===
Cotham
Party	Candidate	Votes	%	±%
Conservative	G. Hebblethwaite	1,480	38.4	−5.1
Liberal	G. Box	1,325	34.4	+1.1
Labour	C. Hackett	857	22.2	+4.1
Green	J. Wingfield	195	5.1	+0.1
Majority		155	4.0	
Conservative hold		Swing	-3.1	

=== Easton ===
Easton
Party	Candidate	Votes	%	±%
Liberal	J. Kiely	2,032	48.4	−2.1
Labour	K. Mahoney	1,721	41.0	+7.4
Conservative	J. Short	385	9.2	−4.5
Green	H. Patrick-Smith	58	1.4	+1.4
Majority		311	7.4	
Liberal hold		Swing	-4.8	

=== Eastville ===
Eastville
Party	Candidate	Votes	%	±%
Conservative	D. Fey	1,628	41.1	−1.2
Labour	M. Georghiou	1,492	37.6	+5.6
Liberal	E. Beaty	693	17.5	−6.2
Green	P. Tonkin	151	3.8	+1.8
Majority		136	3.5	
Conservative hold		Swing	-3.4	

=== Filwood ===
Filwood
Party	Candidate	Votes	%	±%
Labour	A. Hillman	1,595	74.0	+3.1
Conservative	T. Wade	332	15.4	−2.3
Alliance	D. Usher	188	8.7	−0.1
Green	S. Price	41	1.9	+1.9
Majority		1,263	58.6	
Labour hold		Swing	+2.7	

=== Frome Vale ===
Frome Vale
Party	Candidate	Votes	%	±%
Labour	B. Kantor	2,144	45.7	+6.8
Conservative	J. Bosdet	1,732	36.9	−5.0
Alliance	B. Matthews	737	15.7	−3.5
Green	C. Kempton	76	1.6	+1.6
Majority		412	8.8	
Labour gain from Conservative		Swing	+5.9	

=== Henbury ===
Henbury
Party	Candidate	Votes	%	±%
Labour	J. Fisk	2,160	47.5	+2.4
Conservative	P. Gollop	1,620	35.6	−6.4
Alliance	P. Barnard	686	15.1	+2.2
Green	T. De Teissier-Prevost	82	1.8	+1.8
Majority		540	11.9	
Labour hold		Swing	+4.4	

=== Henleaze ===
Henleaze
Party	Candidate	Votes	%	±%
Conservative	G. Browne	2,565	56.9	−8.9
Alliance	K. Griew	1,126	25.0	+2.2
Labour	M. Vokins	610	13.5	+2.1
Green	R. Winfield	207	4.6	+4.6
Majority		1,439	31.9	
Conservative hold		Swing	-5.6	

=== Hillfields ===
Hillfields
Party	Candidate	Votes	%	±%
Labour	D. Naysmith	1,885	57.8	+10.1
Conservative	J. Seville	794	24.4	−9.9
Liberal	E. Fletcher	511	15.7	−2.3
Green	S. Campbell	70	2.1	+2.1
Majority		1,091	33.4	
Labour hold		Swing	+10.0	

=== Horfield ===
Horfield
Party	Candidate	Votes	%	±%
Conservative	B. Topham	2,139	49.0	+4.5
Labour	J. McLaren	1,360	31.1	+9.0
Liberal	S. Young	768	17.6	−14.4
Green	C. Lloyd	100	2.3	+0.9
Majority		779	17.9	
Conservative hold		Swing	+2.3	

=== Kingsweston ===
Kingsweston
Party	Candidate	Votes	%	±%
Labour	T.R. Thomas	1,964	44.4	−1.8
Conservative	R. Mellor	1,856	42.0	+2.0
Alliance	P. Cole	547	12.4	−1.4
Green	J. Oakes	55	1.2	+1.2
Majority		108	2.4	
Labour hold		Swing	-1.9	

=== Lawrence Hill ===
Lawrence Hill
Party	Candidate	Votes	%	±%
Labour	D. Tedder	2,305	71.6	+5.2
Conservative	I. Millard	505	15.7	−1.9
Liberal	J. Exon	358	11.1	−4.8
Green	S. Porter	53	1.6	+1.6
Majority		1,800	55.9	
Labour hold		Swing	+3.6	

=== Lockleaze ===
Lockleaze
Party	Candidate	Votes	%	±%
Labour	J. Hynes	1,909	55.1	+6.1
Conservative	S. Chaplin	962	27.8	+1.6
Liberal	F. Young	534	15.4	−9.4
Green	K. Woodhouse	61	1.8	+1.8
Majority		947	27.3	
Labour hold		Swing	+2.3	

=== Redland ===
Redland
Party	Candidate	Votes	%	±%
Conservative	T. Allen	1,843	42.3	−10.5
Alliance	S. Emmett	1,267	29.1	+7.5
Labour	B. Begley	1,020	23.4	+5.0
Green	T. Leegwater	230	5.3	−1.9
Majority		576	13.2	
Conservative hold		Swing	-9.0	

=== Southmead ===
Southmead
Party	Candidate	Votes	%	±%
Labour	L. Bromham	1,819	54.5	+4.5
Conservative	I. Roberts	889	26.6	−10.0
Alliance	A. Barnard	582	17.4	+4.0
Green	J. Jameson	48	1.4	+1.4
Majority		930	27.9	
Labour hold		Swing	+7.3	

=== Southville ===
Southville
Party	Candidate	Votes	%	±%
Labour	R. Walton	2,151	56.5	+10.6
Conservative	T. Skipp	1,012	26.6	−7.8
Alliance	G. Wright	506	13.3	−3.9
Green	R. Martin	138	3.6	+1.1
Majority		1,139	29.9	
Labour hold		Swing	+9.2	

=== Stoke Bishop ===
Stoke Bishop
Party	Candidate	Votes	%	±%
Conservative	P. Abraham	2,721	54.3	−13.2
Liberal	D. Jones	1,587	31.7	+16.3
Labour	M. Riley	580	11.6	−1.7
Green	C. Rose	123	2.5	−1.4
Majority		1,134	22.6	
Conservative hold		Swing	-14.8	

=== Westbury-on-Trym ===
Westbury-on-Trym
Party	Candidate	Votes	%	±%
Conservative	D. Poole	3,149	66.9	−6.4
Liberal	A. West	919	19.5	+4.8
Labour	W. Payne	528	11.2	+0.8
Green	J. Kempton	112	2.4	+0.9
Majority		2,230	47.4	
Conservative hold		Swing	-5.6	

== Sources ==
- Bristol Evening Post 9 May 1986
