= 1987 Bristol City Council election =

1987 UK local government election

← 1986	7 May 1987	1988 →

23 of 68 seats (one third) to Bristol City Council 35 seats needed for a majority
	First party	Second party	Third party
Party	Labour	Conservative	Alliance
Seats won	37	25	6
Seat change	▲2	▼1	▼1
Council control before election
Labour Party (UK)
Council control after election
Labour Party (UK)

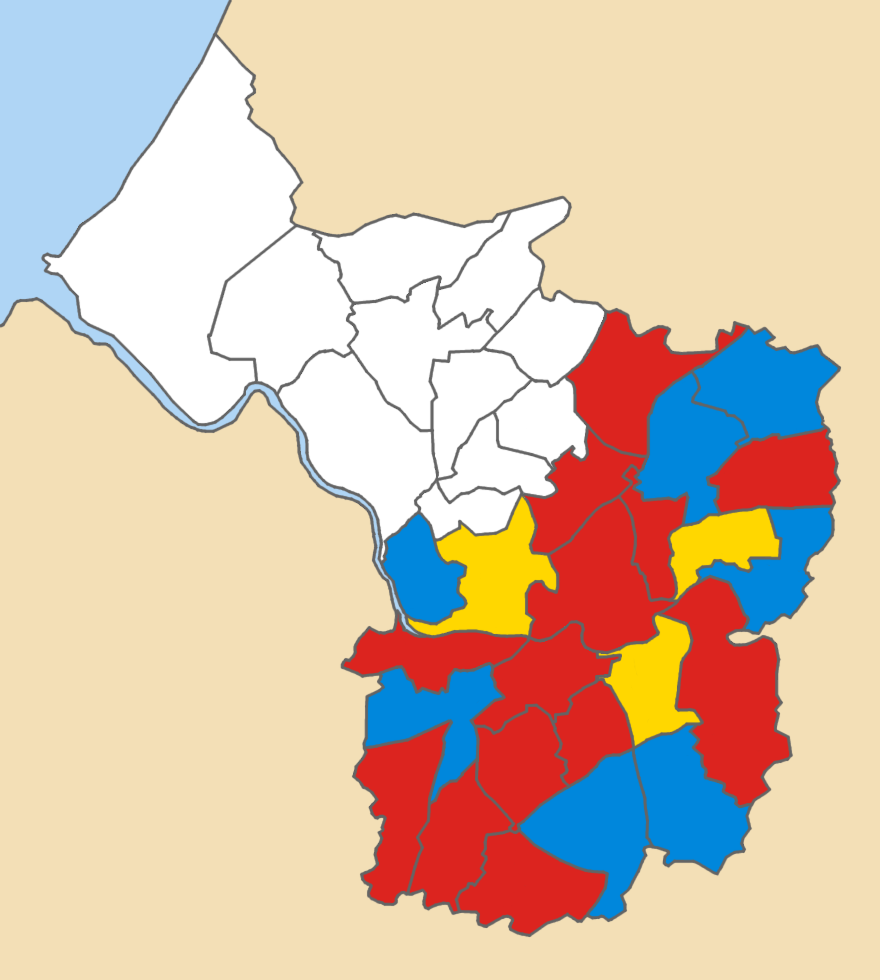
1987 local election results in Bristol

The 1987 Bristol City Council election took place on 7 May 1987 to elect members of Bristol City Council in England. This was on the same day as other local elections. One third of seats were up for election. There was also a by-election in Clifton. There was a general but very small swing away from the Conservatives.

== Ward results ==
The change is calculated using the 1983 election results.

=== Ashley ===
Ashley
Party	Candidate	Votes	%	±%
Labour	J. Williams	2,050	55.0	+3.2
Alliance	C. Bolton	738	19.8	+7.8
Conservative	B. Anderson	641	17.2	−10.2
Green	D. Bowring	297	8.0	+3.3
Majority		1,312	35.2	
Labour hold		Swing	-2.3	

=== Bedminster ===
Bedminster
Party	Candidate	Votes	%	±%
Conservative	I. Gillard	1,726	37.4	−8.5
Labour	P. Roberts	1,680	36.4	−5.8
Alliance	D. Usher	1,129	24.5	+12.6
Green	M. Wood	78	1.7	+1.7
Majority		46	1.0	
Conservative hold		Swing	-1.4	

=== Bishopsworth ===
Bishopsworth
Party	Candidate	Votes	%	±%
Labour	H. Willcox	1,501	41.6	+1.0
Conservative	V. Goodland	1,452	40.2	−2.8
Alliance	S. Willis	621	17.2	+0.8
Green	L. Golden	34	0.9	+0.9
Majority		49	1.4	
Labour gain from Conservative		Swing	+1.9	

=== Brislington East ===
Brislington East
Party	Candidate	Votes	%	±%
Labour	A. Thomas	2,001	43.4	+2.5
Conservative	J. Cressey	1,564	33.9	−0.6
Liberal	J. Exon	923	20.0	+9.5
Green	C. Taylor	120	2.6	+2.6
Majority		437	9.5	
Labour hold		Swing	=1.6	

=== Brislington West ===
Brislington West
Party	Candidate	Votes	%	±%
Liberal	M. Langley	2,373	48.0	+21.5
Conservative	S. Weeks	1,450	29.3	−16.4
Labour	N. Wills	1,052	21.3	−6.5
Green	R. Winfield	66	1.3	+1.3
Majority		923	18.7	
Liberal gain from Conservative		Swing	+19.0	

- The Liberals won Brislington West at the 1986 by-election and held the seat at this election.

=== Cabot ===
Cabot
Party	Candidate	Votes	%	±%
Liberal	R. Howell	1,623	40.7	−2.4
Conservative	G. Keeley	1,171	29.4	−3.6
Labour	G. Buchanan	984	24.7	+5.0
Green	W. Steedman	182	4.6	+0.4
Communist	W. Hunter	29	0.7	
Majority		452	11.3	
Liberal hold		Swing	+0.6	

=== Clifton ===
Clifton by-election
Party	Candidate	Votes	%	±%
Conservative	A. Tasker	2,173	41.6	−3.4
Alliance	C. Elson	2,069	39.6	+1.7
Labour	Tony Robinson	809	15.5	+1.8
Green	G. Sawday	177	3.4	0.0
Majority		104	2.0	
Conservative hold		Swing	-3.6	

=== Easton ===
Easton
Party	Candidate	Votes	%	±%
Labour	K. Mahoney	1,919	45.9	+12.3
Liberal	G. Hopkins	1,667	39.9	−10.6
Conservative	I. Millard	533	12.8	−0.9
Green	R. Nichols	58	1.4	+1.4
Majority		252	6.0	
Labour gain from Liberal		Swing	+11.5	

=== Eastville ===
Eastville
Party	Candidate	Votes	%	±%
Conservative	J. Vowles	1,922	46.3	+4.0
Labour	J. McLaren	1,381	33.2	+1.2
Alliance	E. Beaty	745	17.9	−5.8
Green	P. Tonkin	106	2.6	+0.6
Majority		541	13.0	
Conservative hold		Swing	+1.4	

=== Filwood ===
Filwood
Party	Candidate	Votes	%	±%
Labour	V. Hicks	1,706	70.0	−0.9
Conservative	J. Telling	403	16.5	−1.2
Alliance	M. Norman	300	12.3	+3.5
Green	D. Tayler	28	1.1	+1.1
Majority		1,303	53.5	
Labour hold		Swing	+0.2	

=== Frome Vale ===
Frome Vale
Party	Candidate	Votes	%	±%
Conservative	K. Blanchard	2,256	43.3	+1.4
Labour	J. Hillier	1,933	37.1	−1.8
Alliance	R. Long	1,020	19.6	+0.4
Majority		323	6.2	
Conservative hold		Swing	+1.6	

=== Hartcliffe ===
Hartcliffe
Party	Candidate	Votes	%	±%
Labour	F. Pidgeon	1,551	47.8	−2.6
Conservative	J. Edwards	1,000	30.8	+1.5
Alliance	R. Sharland	625	19.3	−1.0
Green	B. Hussain	66	2.0	+2.0
Majority		551	17.0	
Labour hold		Swing	-2.1	

=== Hengrove ===
Hengrove
Party	Candidate	Votes	%	±%
Conservative	A. Telling	2,138	39.6	−13.6
Alliance	J. Webb	1,878	34.8	+22.6
Labour	M. Riley	1,380	25.6	−9.0
Majority		260	4.8	
Conservative hold		Swing	-18.1	

=== Hillfields ===
Hillfields
Party	Candidate	Votes	%	±%
Labour	G. Robertson	1,634	45.9	−1.8
Conservative	T. Murphy	1,242	34.9	+0.6
Alliance	E. Fletcher	684	19.2	+1.2
Majority		392	11.0	
Labour hold		Swing	-1.2	

=== Knowle ===
Knowle
Party	Candidate	Votes	%	±%
Labour	S. Lamprey	1,766	47.7	+1.6
Conservative	T. Skipp	1,329	35.9	−5.0
Alliance	E. James	548	14.8	+1.7
Green	M. Pitt	61	1.6	+1.6
Majority		437	11.8	
Labour hold		Swing	+3.3	

=== Lawrence Hill ===
Lawrence Hill
Party	Candidate	Votes	%	±%
Labour	J. Jones	2,142	62.3	−4.1
Conservative	G. Marshall	638	18.6	+1.0
Liberal	N. Winch	572	16.6	+0.7
Communist	A. Gilchrist	87	2.5	+2.5
Majority		1,504	43.7	
Labour hold		Swing	-2.6	

=== Lockleaze ===
Lockleaze
Party	Candidate	Votes	%	±%
Labour	C. Merrett	2,059	53.7	+4.7
Conservative	M. Davis	1,260	32.8	+6.6
Alliance	F. Young	477	12.4	−12.4
Green	K. Woodhouse	40	1.0	+1.0
Majority		799	20.8	
Labour hold		Swing	-1.0	

=== Southville ===
Southville
Party	Candidate	Votes	%	±%
Labour	A. May	2,087	50.1	+4.2
Conservative	M. Jarrett	1,309	31.5	−2.9
Alliance	D. Smith	608	14.6	−2.6
Green	A. Grant	158	3.8	+1.3
Majority		778	18.7	
Labour hold		Swing	+3.6	

=== Stockwood ===
Stockwood
Party	Candidate	Votes	%	±%
Conservative	M. Stamper	2,896	50.4	−0.9
Labour	A. Loveless	1,688	29.4	−6.5
Alliance	R. Bingham	1,108	19.3	+6.6
Green	G. Dorey	49	0.9	+0.9
Majority		1,208	21.0	
Conservative hold		Swing	+2.8	

=== St George East ===
St. George East
Party	Candidate	Votes	%	±%
Conservative	K. Mountstephen	1,739	42.3	−4.4
Labour	C. Price	1,441	35.0	−4.6
Alliance	J. Osborne	862	20.9	+7.2
Green	C. Stones	73	1.8	+1.8
Majority		298	7.2	
Conservative hold		Swing	+0.1	

=== St George West ===
St. George West
Party	Candidate	Votes	%	±%
Liberal	R. Lewis	2,000	51.1	+9.9
Labour	V. Hammond	1,273	32.5	−2.7
Conservative	M. Stump	644	16.4	−7.2
Majority		727	18.6	
Liberal hold		Swing	+6.3	

=== Whitchurch Park ===
Whitchurch Park
Party	Candidate	Votes	%	±%
Labour	J. Rumble	1,777	53.8	−2.0
Conservative	A. Lancaster	904	27.4	+0.1
Alliance	F. Thomas	579	17.5	+0.6
Green	K. Saben	42	1.3	+1.3
Majority		873	26.4	
Labour hold		Swing	-1.1	

=== Windmill Hill ===
Windmill Hill
Party	Candidate	Votes	%	±%
Labour	G. Micklewright	2,462	51.4	+1.4
Conservative	A. Read	1,403	29.3	−5.7
Alliance	J. Bushell	748	15.6	+0.5
Green	S. Campbell	180	3.8	+3.8
Majority		1,059	22.1	
Labour hold		Swing	+3.6	

== Sources ==
- Bristol Evening Post 8 May 1987
