= 1979 Bristol City Council election =

1979 UK local government election

← 1976	3 May 1979	1983 →

All 84 seats to Bristol City Council 43 seats needed for a majority
	First party	Second party	Third party
Party	Labour	Conservative	Liberal
Seats won	53	28	3
Seat change	▲6	▼6	Steady
Council control before election
Labour Party (UK)
Council control after election
Labour Party (UK)

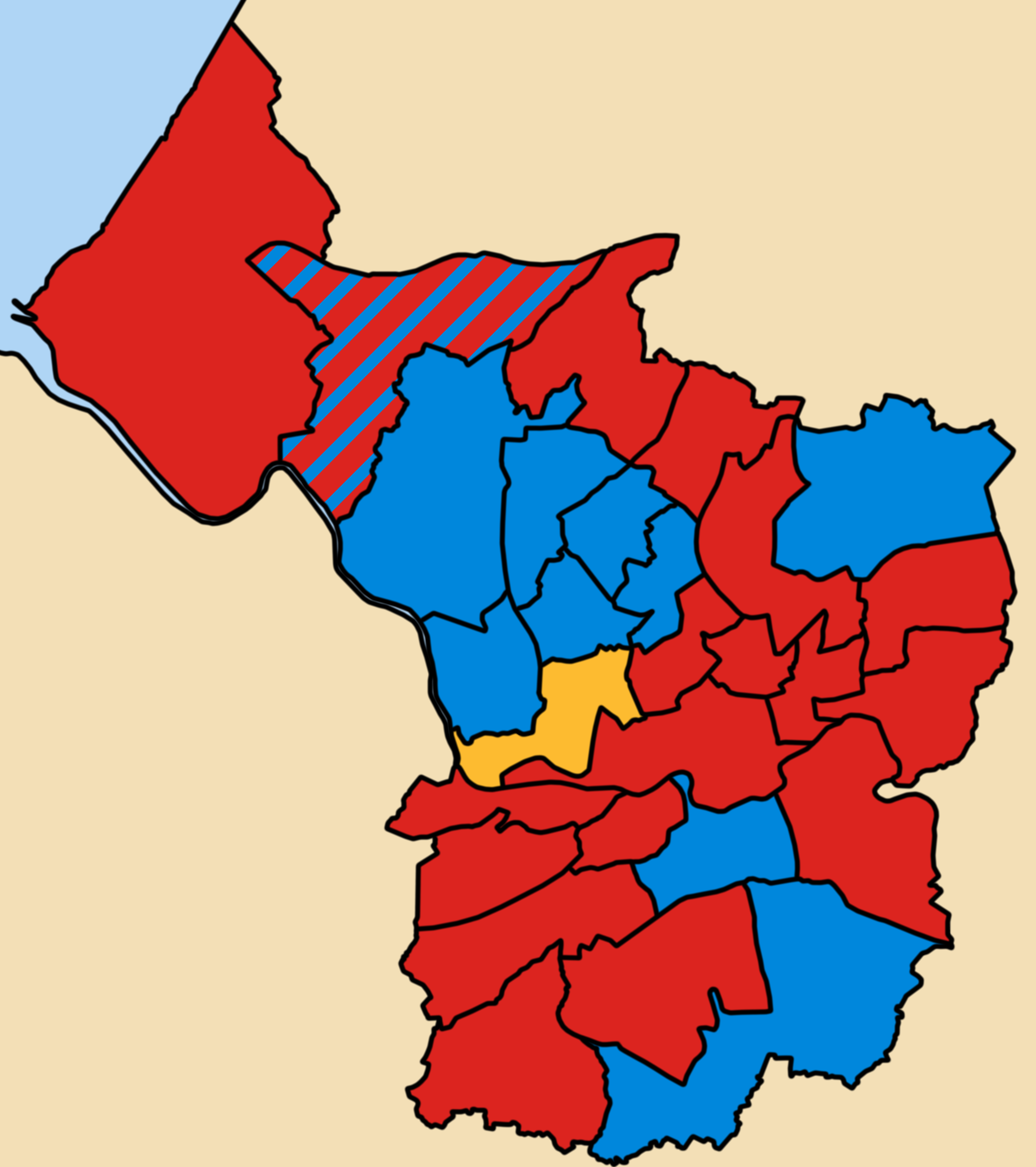
1979 local election results in Bristol

The 1979 Bristol City Council election took place on 3 May 1979 to elect members of Bristol City Council in England. This was on the same day as other local elections and the 1979 general election. In contrast to the Conservative landslide in the national election, the Conservatives in Bristol lost 6 seats to Labour, who maintained overall control of the council.

== Ward results ==
=== Avon ===
Avon
Party	Candidate	Votes	%	±%
Labour	T Thomas	5,411		
Labour	V Pople	5,255		
Labour	A Crowley	5,202		
Conservative	R Chubb	3,674		
Conservative	J Gamlin	2,907		
Conservative	L O'Leary	2,791		
Communist	D Pratt	391		
Majority				
Labour hold		Swing	{{{swing}}}	
Labour hold		Swing	{{{swing}}}	
Labour hold		Swing	{{{swing}}}	

=== Bedminster ===
Bedminster
Party	Candidate	Votes	%	±%
Labour	A Hillman	3,521		
Labour	J Wood	3,466		
Labour	W Jenkins	3,425		
Conservative	R Marriott	2,506		
Conservative	J Fey	2,499		
Conservative	J Boucher	2,463		
Majority				
Labour hold		Swing	{{{swing}}}	
Labour hold		Swing	{{{swing}}}	
Labour hold		Swing	{{{swing}}}	

=== Bishopston ===
Bishopston
Party	Candidate	Votes	%	±%
Conservative	D Topham	3,155		
Conservative	T Clarke	3,139		
Conservative	M Withers	3,092		
Labour	P McLaren	1,916		
Labour	J Wood	1,853		
Labour	J Graystone	1,801		
Liberal	J Gray	1,377		
Liberal	J McMahon	1,370		
Liberal	W Starr	1,172		
National Front	F Tanner	51		
Majority				
Conservative hold		Swing	{{{swing}}}	
Conservative hold		Swing	{{{swing}}}	
Conservative hold		Swing	{{{swing}}}	

=== Bishopsworth ===
Bishopsworth
Party	Candidate	Votes	%	±%
Labour	A Munroe	8,123		
Labour	B Richards	8,122		
Labour	L Smith	8,108		
Conservative	R Hodges	4,002		
Conservative	I Gillard	3,783		
Conservative	N Dowdney	3,632		
National Front	K Elliott	793		
Majority				
Labour hold		Swing	{{{swing}}}	
Labour hold		Swing	{{{swing}}}	
Labour hold		Swing	{{{swing}}}	

=== Brislington ===
Brislington
Party	Candidate	Votes	%	±%
Labour	K Legg	5,192		
Labour	D Parsons	4,597		
Labour	P Korovilas	4,391		
Conservative	J Howe	4,334		
Conservative	O Scantlebury	4,092		
Conservative	A Ellison	3,975		
Majority				
Labour hold		Swing	{{{swing}}}	
Labour hold		Swing	{{{swing}}}	
Labour gain from Conservative		Swing	{{{swing}}}	

=== Cabot ===
Cabot
Party	Candidate	Votes	%	±%
Liberal	R Howell	2,227		
Liberal	C Stones	2,154		
Liberal	C Bolton	2,140		
Conservative	B Love	1,688		
Conservative	Y Mason	1,672		
Conservative	I Millard	1,672		
Labour	J Dugdale	1,172		
Labour	J Malos	1,117		
Labour	K Anand	1,101		
Communist	A Chester	192		
Majority				
Liberal hold		Swing	{{{swing}}}	
Liberal hold		Swing	{{{swing}}}	
Liberal hold		Swing	{{{swing}}}	

=== Clifton ===
Clifton
Party	Candidate	Votes	%	±%
Conservative	J Steadman	3,823		
Conservative	W Blackmore	3,635		
Conservative	J Lloyd-Kirk	3,580		
Liberal	D Himsworth	1,999		
Liberal	B Ineichen	1,911		
Labour	S Hodkinson	1,433		
Labour	H Harding	1,388		
Labour	A Mackenzie	1,323		
Ecology	A Clarke	1,195		
Ecology	J Will	890		
Majority				
Conservative hold		Swing	{{{swing}}}	
Conservative hold		Swing	{{{swing}}}	
Conservative hold		Swing	{{{swing}}}	

=== District ===
District
Party	Candidate	Votes	%	±%
Conservative	F Apperley	2,347		
Conservative	F Bosdet	2,284		
Conservative	R Trench	2,264		
Labour	H Fenwick	2,247		
Labour	M Shotter	2,110		
Labour	G Venables	2,087		
Liberal	B Carter	1,126		
Liberal	O England	1,023		
Liberal	P Tyzack	910		
Ecology	H Cullimore	553		
Majority				
Conservative hold		Swing	{{{swing}}}	
Conservative hold		Swing	{{{swing}}}	
Conservative hold		Swing	{{{swing}}}	

=== Durdham ===
Durdham
Party	Candidate	Votes	%	±%
Conservative	G Palmer	5,154		
Conservative	G Browne	4,917		
Conservative	P Paternoster	4,638		
Liberal	G Beddoes	2,149		
Liberal	W Howarth	2,149		
Liberal	V Tallis	1,990		
Labour	J Patterson	1,240		
Labour	J Naysmith	1,180		
Labour	R Richie	1,020		
Majority				
Conservative hold		Swing	{{{swing}}}	
Conservative hold		Swing	{{{swing}}}	
Conservative hold		Swing	{{{swing}}}	

=== Easton ===
Easton
Party	Candidate	Votes	%	±%
Labour	J Jones	3,022		
Labour	G Maggs	2,771		
Labour	R Morris	2,331		
Conservative	A Mayes	1,181		
Conservative	K Blanchard	1,161		
Conservative	R Paternoster	1,001		
Ecology	M Weekes	276		
Communist	D Esbester	173		
National Front	J Bale	147		
Majority				
Labour hold		Swing	{{{swing}}}	
Labour hold		Swing	{{{swing}}}	
Labour hold		Swing	{{{swing}}}	

=== Eastville ===
Eastville
Party	Candidate	Votes	%	±%
Labour	W Williams	1,654		
Labour	J Hynes	1,614		
Labour	J King	1,603		
Conservative	M Macdonald	894		
Conservative	W Lippiatt	847		
Conservative	M Read	817		
Liberal	A Elverd	157		
Liberal	B Clarke	141		
Liberal	S Staple	124		
National Front	P Kingston	94		
National Front	D Smithurst	61		
National Front	J Dowler	45		
ETOFEC	M Elbourne	41		
Majority				
Labour hold		Swing	{{{swing}}}	
Labour hold		Swing	{{{swing}}}	
Labour hold		Swing	{{{swing}}}	

=== Henbury ===
Henbury
Party	Candidate	Votes	%	±%
Labour	J Fisk	6,000		
Labour	J McLaren	5,077		
Conservative	W Stephens	4,881		
Conservative	D Barnwell	4,755		
Conservative	B Tasman	4,427		
Labour	M Malpass	4,370		
Liberal	W Hurford	1,451		
National Front	C Nuttall	268		
Majority				
Labour hold		Swing	{{{swing}}}	
Labour gain from Conservative		Swing	{{{swing}}}	
Conservative hold		Swing	{{{swing}}}	

=== Hengrove ===
Hengrove
Party	Candidate	Votes	%	±%
Labour	A Abrams	6,981		
Labour	V Hicks	6,528		
Labour	G Spodris	5,268		
Conservative	C Jones	2,894		
Conservative	K Godden	2,731		
Conservative	M Mason	2,676		
Majority				
Labour hold		Swing	{{{swing}}}	
Labour hold		Swing	{{{swing}}}	
Labour hold		Swing	{{{swing}}}	

=== Hillfields ===
Hillfields
Party	Candidate	Votes	%	±%
Labour	G Robertson	3,885		
Labour	C Draper	3,668		
Labour	C Janes	3,610		
Conservative	J Seville	2,552		
Conservative	A Davies	2,390		
Conservative	R Russell	2,309		
Independent Liberal	A Chalmers	957		
Independent Liberal	A Chalmers	865		
Independent Liberal	M Cottrell	863		
Majority				
Labour hold		Swing	{{{swing}}}	
Labour hold		Swing	{{{swing}}}	
Labour hold		Swing	{{{swing}}}	

=== Horfield ===
Horfield
Party	Candidate	Votes	%	±%
Labour	C Merrett	3,896		
Labour	R Edwards	3,710		
Labour	C Boney	3,563		
Conservative	B Topham	3,170		
Conservative	B Cripps	2,842		
Conservative	J Wiltshire	2,728		
Liberal	P Hurford	750		
Liberal	R Moon	701		
Liberal	S Moon	679		
Majority				
Labour hold		Swing	{{{swing}}}	
Labour gain from Conservative		Swing	{{{swing}}}	
Labour hold		Swing	{{{swing}}}	

=== Knowle ===
Knowle
Party	Candidate	Votes	%	±%
Conservative	G Sprackling	3,904		
Conservative	T Skipp	3,702		
Conservative	F Lawrence	3,686		
Labour	G Cole	2,916		
Labour	J Cole	2,702		
Labour	T Ward	2,591		
National Front	R Dowler	218		
Majority				
Conservative hold		Swing	{{{swing}}}	
Conservative hold		Swing	{{{swing}}}	
Conservative hold		Swing	{{{swing}}}	

=== Redland ===
Redland
Party	Candidate	Votes	%	±%
Conservative	G Hebblethwaite	3,377		
Conservative	J Cottrell	3,258		
Conservative	G Keeley	3,138		
Liberal	B Brown	1,772		
Labour	A Keefe	1,717		
Liberal	P Child	1,660		
Labour	J Kemp	1,548		
Liberal	R Cutts	1,521		
Labour	T Morgan	1,486		
Majority				
Conservative hold		Swing	{{{swing}}}	
Conservative hold		Swing	{{{swing}}}	
Conservative hold		Swing	{{{swing}}}	

=== Somerset ===
Somerset
Party	Candidate	Votes	%	±%
Labour	H Willcox	4,653		
Labour	D Jackson	4,435		
Labour	J Comerford	4,097		
Conservative	W Goodland	2,602		
Conservative	V Goodland	2,584		
Conservative	D Stevens	2,523		
Majority				
Labour hold		Swing	{{{swing}}}	
Labour hold		Swing	{{{swing}}}	
Labour hold		Swing	{{{swing}}}	

=== Southmead ===
Southmead
Party	Candidate	Votes	%	±%
Labour	D Hughes	5,144		
Labour	B Begley	4,949		
Labour	E Seymour	4,410		
Conservative	P Sidebottom	4,306		
Conservative	P Holloway	4,295		
Conservative	C Martineau	4,129		
Majority				
Labour gain from Conservative		Swing	{{{swing}}}	
Labour gain from Conservative		Swing	{{{swing}}}	
Labour gain from Conservative		Swing	{{{swing}}}	

=== Southville ===
Southville
Party	Candidate	Votes	%	±%
Labour	A Mason	2,563		
Labour	F Pidgeon	2,451		
Labour	A May	2,402		
Conservative	D Jones	2,181		
Conservative	C Hagen	2,070		
Conservative	L Vann	2,007		
Majority				
Labour hold		Swing	{{{swing}}}	
Labour hold		Swing	{{{swing}}}	
Labour hold		Swing	{{{swing}}}	

=== St George East ===
St George East
Party	Candidate	Votes	%	±%
Labour	D Beer	5,011		
Labour	G Bee	4,698		
Labour	P Hammond	4,482		
Conservative	R King	4,187		
Conservative	R Murray	4,100		
Conservative	M Stump	3,702		
Majority				
Labour hold		Swing	{{{swing}}}	
Labour hold		Swing	{{{swing}}}	
Labour hold		Swing	{{{swing}}}	

=== St George West ===
St George West
Party	Candidate	Votes	%	±%
Labour	J McLaren	3,135		
Labour	I Rogers	2,797		
Labour	M Rea	2,700		
Conservative	J Cornelius	1,857		
Conservative	R Godden	1,666		
Conservative	R Laurence	1,562		
National Front	D Smithurst	220		
Majority				
Labour hold		Swing	{{{swing}}}	
Labour hold		Swing	{{{swing}}}	
Labour hold		Swing	{{{swing}}}	

=== St Paul ===
St Paul
Party	Candidate	Votes	%	±%
Labour	R Hewlett	2,219		
Labour	K Bassett	2,197		
Labour	G Fowler	2,166		
Conservative	A Millener	1,091		
Conservative	J Lippitt	1,072		
Conservative	S Trench	996		
Majority				
Labour hold		Swing	{{{swing}}}	
Labour hold		Swing	{{{swing}}}	
Labour hold		Swing	{{{swing}}}	

=== St Philip & Jacob ===
St Philip & Jacob
Party	Candidate	Votes	%	±%
Labour	I Knight	1,644		
Labour	J Britton	1,562		
Labour	D Tedder	1,556		
Conservative	M Lippitt	927		
Conservative	A Haines	894		
Conservative	D Fey	851		
Majority				
Labour hold		Swing	{{{swing}}}	
Labour hold		Swing	{{{swing}}}	
Labour hold		Swing	{{{swing}}}	

=== Stapleton ===
Stapleton
Party	Candidate	Votes	%	±%
Conservative	T Whiteley	4,942		
Conservative	P Brook	4,834		
Conservative	H Williams	4,677		
Labour	B Payton	3,877		
Labour	M McGrath	3,779		
Labour	D Poole	3,665		
Liberal	M Cullen	1,113		
Liberal	E Wren	993		
Liberal	J Hale	961		
Majority				
Conservative hold		Swing	{{{swing}}}	
Conservative hold		Swing	{{{swing}}}	
Conservative hold		Swing	{{{swing}}}	

=== Stockwood ===
Stockwood
Party	Candidate	Votes	%	±%
Conservative	A Telling	8,271		
Conservative	M Stamper	8,143		
Conservative	S Williams	8,014		
Labour	V Davey	7,658		
Labour	G Easton	7,099		
Labour	J Smith	6,520		
National Front	J Dowler	628		
Majority				
Conservative hold		Swing	{{{swing}}}	
Conservative hold		Swing	{{{swing}}}	
Conservative hold		Swing	{{{swing}}}	

=== Westbury-on-Trym ===
Westbury-on-Trym
Party	Candidate	Votes	%	±%
Conservative	D Poole			
Conservative	C Alderson	9,542		
Conservative	R Wall	9,439		
Liberal	E Dyson	2,372		
Liberal	M Hamilton	2,185		
Liberal	M Luton	1,941		
Labour	J Evans	1,749		
Labour	M Waddington	1,429		
Labour	G Waddington	1,367		
National Front	E Andrews	151		
Majority				
Conservative hold		Swing	{{{swing}}}	
Conservative hold		Swing	{{{swing}}}	
Conservative hold		Swing	{{{swing}}}	

=== Windmill Hill ===
Windmill Hill
Party	Candidate	Votes	%	±%
Labour	C Reid	2,463		
Labour	V Bath	2,244		
Labour	G Micklewright	2,201		
Conservative	D Cary	1,397		
Conservative	A Moore	1,270		
Conservative	P Morris	1,192		
Liberal	M Pipping	577		
Liberal	R Lewis	488		
National Front	R Bale	174		
Majority				
Labour hold		Swing	{{{swing}}}	
Labour hold		Swing	{{{swing}}}	
Labour hold		Swing	{{{swing}}}	
