= 1976 Bristol City Council election =

1976 UK local government election

← 1973	6 May 1976	1979 →

All 84 seats to Bristol City Council 43 seats needed for a majority
	First party	Second party	Third party
Party	Labour	Conservative	Liberal
Seats won	47	34	3
Seat change	▼9	▲9	Steady
Council control before election
Labour Party (UK)
Council control after election
Labour Party (UK)

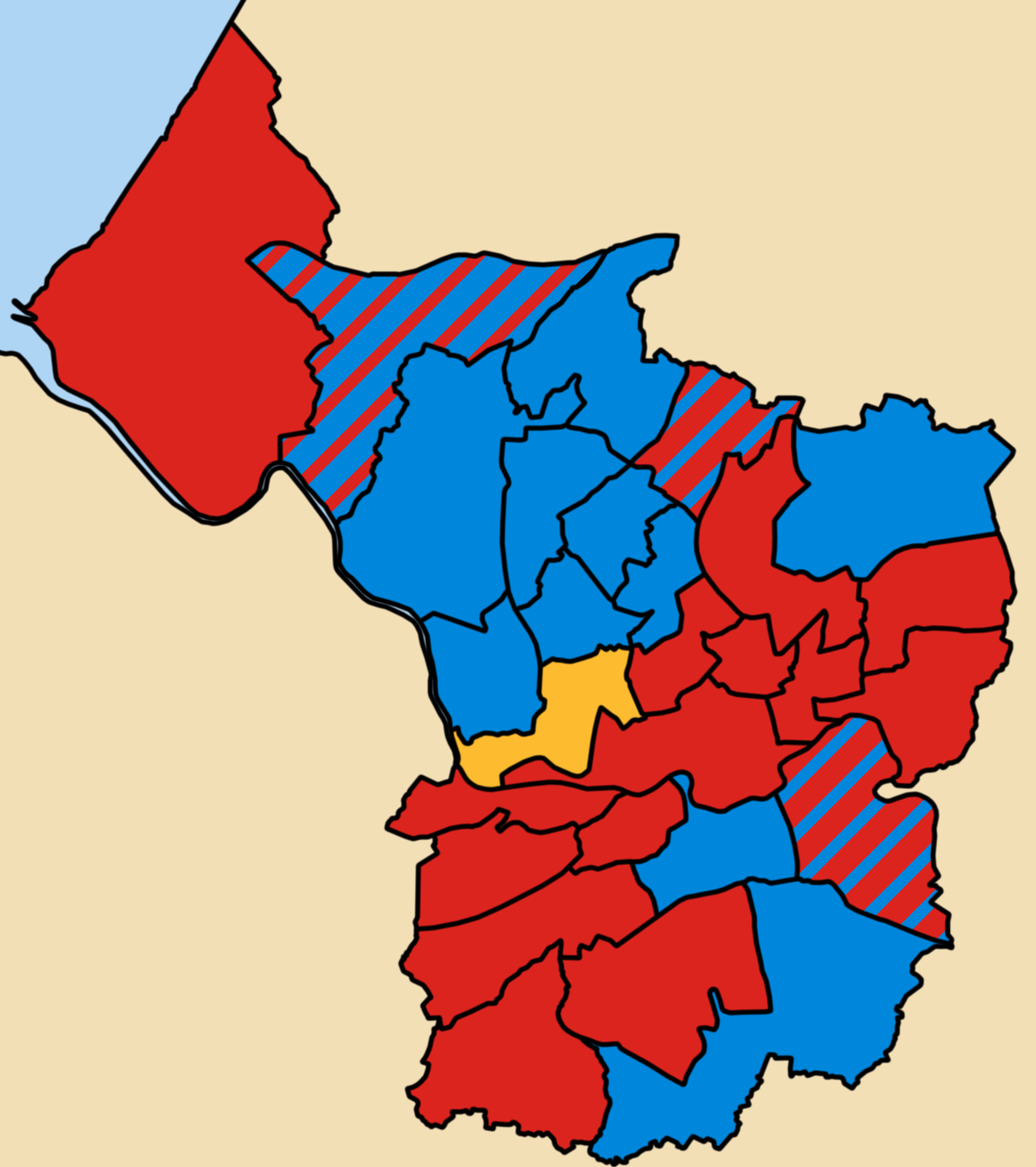
1976 local election results in Bristol

The 1976 Bristol City Council election took place on 6 May 1976 to elect members of Bristol City Council in England. This was on the same day as other local elections. Labour retained overall control of the council despite losing 9 seats to the Conservatives.

== Ward results ==
=== Avon ===
Avon
Party	Candidate	Votes	%	±%
Labour	V Pople	3,031		
Labour	A Crowley	2,911		
Labour	T Thomas	2,744		
Conservative	R Chubb	1,930		
Conservative	J Henley	1,632		
Conservative	V Bath	1,558		
Communist	D Pratt	315		
Majority				
Labour hold		Swing	{{{swing}}}	
Labour hold		Swing	{{{swing}}}	
Labour hold		Swing	{{{swing}}}	

=== Bedminster ===
Bedminster
Party	Candidate	Votes	%	±%
Labour	A Hillman	1,725		
Labour	J Wood	1,571		
Labour	W Jenkins	1,549		
Conservative	C Hagen	1,161		
Conservative	L Vann	1,113		
Conservative	V Goodland	1,107		
Liberal	R Turner	434		
National Front	R Bale	184		
Majority				
Labour hold		Swing	{{{swing}}}	
Labour hold		Swing	{{{swing}}}	
Labour hold		Swing	{{{swing}}}	

=== Bishopston ===
Bishopston
Party	Candidate	Votes	%	±%
Conservative	D Topham	2,214		
Conservative	T Clarke	2,100		
Conservative	M Withers	2,078		
Labour	E Boney	1,012		
Labour	M Shotter	982		
Labour	J Wood	961		
Liberal	K Tucker	684		
Liberal	J McMahon	656		
Majority				
Conservative hold		Swing	{{{swing}}}	
Conservative hold		Swing	{{{swing}}}	
Conservative hold		Swing	{{{swing}}}	

=== Bishopsworth ===
Bishopsworth
Party	Candidate	Votes	%	±%
Labour	L Smith	2,364		
Labour	A Munroe	2,180		
Labour	B B Richards	2,121		
Conservative	B D Richards	1,127		
Conservative	H Jones	976		
Conservative	P Paternoster	911		
Liberal	J Fletcher	475		
Liberal	P Ellis	429		
Liberal	P Bentley	394		
National Front	K Elliott	287		
Majority				
Labour hold		Swing	{{{swing}}}	
Labour hold		Swing	{{{swing}}}	
Labour hold		Swing	{{{swing}}}	

=== Brislington ===
Brislington
Party	Candidate	Votes	%	±%
Labour	K Legg	2,320		
Labour	R Flinn	2,238		
Conservative	O Patterson	2,234		
Labour	H Skeates	2,190		
Conservative	O Scantlebury	2,165		
Conservative	R Frankham	2,049		
Majority				
Labour hold		Swing	{{{swing}}}	
Labour hold		Swing	{{{swing}}}	
Conservative gain from Labour		Swing	{{{swing}}}	

=== Cabot ===
Cabot
Party	Candidate	Votes	%	±%
Liberal	G Ferguson	1,353		
Liberal	W Watts-Miller	1,331		
Liberal	G Beedell	1,326		
Conservative	P Muir	1,134		
Conservative	B Weedall	1,092		
Conservative	J Yarwood	1,066		
Labour	P McLaren	750		
Labour	J King	737		
Labour	L Aldridge	705		
Majority				
Liberal hold		Swing	{{{swing}}}	
Liberal hold		Swing	{{{swing}}}	
Liberal hold		Swing	{{{swing}}}	

=== Clifton ===
Clifton
Party	Candidate	Votes	%	±%
Conservative	J Lloyd-Kirk	2,324		
Conservative	H Lawson	2,273		
Conservative	W Blackmore	2,242		
Labour	M Hodkinson	1,094		
Labour	G Micklewright	1,083		
Labour	M Thomas	1,033		
Liberal	S Mercer	990		
Liberal	E Dunning	973		
Liberal	M Perkins	972		
Majority				
Conservative hold		Swing	{{{swing}}}	
Conservative hold		Swing	{{{swing}}}	
Conservative hold		Swing	{{{swing}}}	

=== District ===
District
Party	Candidate	Votes	%	±%
Conservative	F Apperley	1,612		
Conservative	R Trench	1,601		
Conservative	J Bosdet	1,525		
Labour	K Bassett	1,223		
Labour	T Morgan	1,133		
Labour	M Wood	1,061		
Liberal	C Bolton	848		
Liberal	J Sansom	729		
Liberal	N Rigby	721		
Majority				
Conservative hold		Swing	{{{swing}}}	
Conservative hold		Swing	{{{swing}}}	
Conservative hold		Swing	{{{swing}}}	

=== Durdham ===
Durdham
Party	Candidate	Votes	%	±%
Conservative	G Palmer	4,061		
Conservative	M Veale	3,880		
Conservative	G Browne	3,869		
Labour	B Begley	962		
Labour	R Ritchie	884		
Labour	J Donovan	882		
Majority				
Conservative hold		Swing	{{{swing}}}	
Conservative hold		Swing	{{{swing}}}	
Conservative hold		Swing	{{{swing}}}	

=== Easton ===
Easton
Party	Candidate	Votes	%	±%
Labour	J Jones	1,358		
Labour	G Maggs	1,134		
Labour	R Morris	1,050		
Conservative	P Haines	495		
Conservative	J Gamlin	463		
Conservative	F Wookey	418		
Communist	N Carey	131		
Majority				
Labour hold		Swing	{{{swing}}}	
Labour hold		Swing	{{{swing}}}	
Labour hold		Swing	{{{swing}}}	

=== Eastville ===
Eastville
Party	Candidate	Votes	%	±%
Labour	W Williams	1,833		
Labour	E Fothergill	1,722		
Labour	B Ross	1,652		
Conservative	R Wookey	1,455		
Conservative	G Woodhouse	1,404		
Conservative	J Fletcher	1,280		
Independent Liberal	A Chalmers	512		
Independent Liberal	B Clarke	347		
Independent Liberal	J Hale	313		
National Front	J Bale	133		
Majority				
Labour hold		Swing	{{{swing}}}	
Labour hold		Swing	{{{swing}}}	
Labour hold		Swing	{{{swing}}}	

=== Henbury ===
Henbury
Party	Candidate	Votes	%	±%
Labour	J Fisk	3,350		
Conservative	W Stephens	3,339		
Conservative	D Barnwell	3,173		
Conservative	C Whitmore	3,167		
Labour	G Brass	2,764		
Labour	D Large	2,633		
Liberal	W Hurford	660		
Liberal	W Paver	634		
Majority				
Labour hold		Swing	{{{swing}}}	
Conservative gain from Labour		Swing	{{{swing}}}	
Conservative gain from Labour		Swing	{{{swing}}}	

=== Hengrove ===
Hengrove
Party	Candidate	Votes	%	±%
Labour	W Graves	2,396		
Labour	A Abrams	2,219		
Labour	M Houlihan	1,924		
Conservative	M Stamper	1,046		
Conservative	A Telling	1,046		
Conservative	G Bridcut	995		
Liberal	G Bentley	276		
Liberal	G Noel	206		
Liberal	V Noel	204		
Majority				
Labour hold		Swing	{{{swing}}}	
Labour hold		Swing	{{{swing}}}	
Labour hold		Swing	{{{swing}}}	

=== Hillfields ===
Hillfields
Party	Candidate	Votes	%	±%
Labour	C Draper	1,811		
Labour	G Robertson	1,806		
Labour	F Vyvyan-Jones	1,659		
Conservative	M Bessant	1,342		
Conservative	C Baker	1,289		
Conservative	A Thomas	1,172		
National Front	F Tanner	165		
Majority				
Labour hold		Swing	{{{swing}}}	
Labour hold		Swing	{{{swing}}}	
Labour hold		Swing	{{{swing}}}	

=== Horfield ===
Horfield
Party	Candidate	Votes	%	±%
Labour	C Merrett	2,245		
Conservative	B Topham	2,224		
Labour	R Edwards	2,175		
Labour	C Boney	2,056		
Conservative	P Cutcher	2,048		
Conservative	R Russell	2,030		
Liberal	P Hurford	596		
Liberal	R Moon	502		
Liberal	V Hales	483		
National Front	P Thomas	269		
Majority				
Labour hold		Swing	{{{swing}}}	
Conservative gain from Labour		Swing	{{{swing}}}	
Labour hold		Swing	{{{swing}}}	

=== Knowle ===
Knowle
Party	Candidate	Votes	%	±%
Conservative	G Sprackling	2,225		
Conservative	E Wright	2,051		
Conservative	F Lawrence	1,981		
Labour	C Gardner	1,102		
National Front	R Dowler	370		
Majority				
Conservative hold		Swing	{{{swing}}}	
Conservative hold		Swing	{{{swing}}}	
Conservative hold		Swing	{{{swing}}}	

=== Redland ===
Redland
Party	Candidate	Votes	%	±%
Conservative	G Hebblethwaite	1,929		
Conservative	C Hebblethwaite	1,904		
Conservative	G Keeley	1,879		
Liberal	R Kirkham	1,074		
Liberal	W Legg	973		
Liberal	W Tasker	972		
Labour	A May	683		
Labour	M Mason	671		
Labour	M Reiner	664		
Majority				
Conservative hold		Swing	{{{swing}}}	
Conservative hold		Swing	{{{swing}}}	
Conservative hold		Swing	{{{swing}}}	

=== Somerset ===
Somerset
Party	Candidate	Votes	%	±%
Labour	H Willcox	1,617		
Labour	D Jackson	1,485		
Labour	J Comerford	1,413		
Conservative	D Stevens	1,017		
Conservative	S Walker	962		
Conservative	H Little	921		
National Front	J Dowler	189		
Liberal	J Fletcher	178		
Liberal	I Adams	138		
Liberal	A Adams	129		
Majority				
Labour hold		Swing	{{{swing}}}	
Labour hold		Swing	{{{swing}}}	
Labour hold		Swing	{{{swing}}}	

=== Southmead ===
Southmead
Party	Candidate	Votes	%	±%
Conservative	F McGough	3,047		
Conservative	P Sidebottom	2,748		
Conservative	N Mearing-Smith	2,686		
Labour	J Hole	2,523		
Labour	R Bridle	2,306		
Labour	A Keefe	2,229		
Majority				
Conservative gain from Labour		Swing	{{{swing}}}	
Conservative hold		Swing	{{{swing}}}	
Conservative gain from Labour		Swing	{{{swing}}}	

=== Southville ===
Southville
Party	Candidate	Votes	%	±%
Labour	H Harding	1,302		
Labour	M Young	1,247		
Labour	F Pidgeon	1,245		
Conservative	C Taylor	1,226		
Conservative	C Fox	1,116		
Conservative	M Jones	1,104		
Liberal	N Harrisson	181		
Liberal	E Ellis	153		
Liberal	A Havvock	142		
Majority				
Labour hold		Swing	{{{swing}}}	
Labour hold		Swing	{{{swing}}}	
Labour hold		Swing	{{{swing}}}	

=== St George East ===
St George East
Party	Candidate	Votes	%	±%
Labour	L Rexworthy	2,226		
Labour	H Bloom	2,222		
Labour	D Beer	2,188		
Conservative	K Mountstephen	2,076		
Conservative	R King	1,902		
Conservative	C Woods	1,817		
Majority				
Labour hold		Swing	{{{swing}}}	
Labour hold		Swing	{{{swing}}}	
Labour hold		Swing	{{{swing}}}	

=== St George West ===
St George West
Party	Candidate	Votes	%	±%
Labour	M Rea	1,437		
Labour	J McLaren	1,417		
Labour	I Rogers	1,399		
Conservative	C Avery	1,108		
Conservative	M Gardner	956		
Conservative	B Irwin	881		
National Front	R Pearce	337		
Majority				
Labour hold		Swing	{{{swing}}}	
Labour hold		Swing	{{{swing}}}	
Labour hold		Swing	{{{swing}}}	

=== St Paul ===
St Paul
Party	Candidate	Votes	%	±%
Labour	D McLaren	1,157		
Labour	G Fowler	1,047		
Labour	P Korovilas	1,012		
Conservative	E Macdonald	596		
Conservative	K Rogers	526		
Conservative	J Seville	483		
Majority				
Labour hold		Swing	{{{swing}}}	
Labour hold		Swing	{{{swing}}}	
Labour hold		Swing	{{{swing}}}	

=== St Philip & Jacob ===
St Philip & Jacob
Party	Candidate	Votes	%	±%
Labour	I Knight	820		
Labour	J Britton	750		
Labour	D Tedder	741		
Conservative	G Edwards	378		
Conservative	S Watton	351		
Conservative	H Edwards	344		
Majority				
Labour hold		Swing	{{{swing}}}	
Labour hold		Swing	{{{swing}}}	
Labour hold		Swing	{{{swing}}}	

=== Stapleton ===
Stapleton
Party	Candidate	Votes	%	±%
Conservative	T Whiteley	3,075		
Conservative	P Brook	3,055		
Conservative	H Williams	3,000		
Labour	C Gingell	1,847		
Labour	M McGrath	1,847		
Labour	B Payton	1,772		
Majority				
Conservative hold		Swing	{{{swing}}}	
Conservative hold		Swing	{{{swing}}}	
Conservative hold		Swing	{{{swing}}}	

=== Stockwood ===
Stockwood
Party	Candidate	Votes	%	±%
Conservative	E Wilsdon	3,748		
Conservative	B Love	3,582		
Conservative	S Williams	3,444		
Labour	G Easton	2,948		
Labour	V Bath	2,750		
Labour	B Barker	2,706		
Liberal	H Bryant	784		
Liberal	J Edwards	654		
Liberal	M Langley	652		
Majority				
Conservative gain from Labour		Swing	{{{swing}}}	
Conservative gain from Labour		Swing	{{{swing}}}	
Conservative gain from Labour		Swing	{{{swing}}}	

=== Westbury-on-Trym ===
Westbury-on-Trym
Party	Candidate	Votes	%	±%
Conservative	D Poole	6,371		
Conservative	R Wall	6,316		
Conservative	C Alderson	6,201		
Liberal	L Edgell	1,063		
Liberal	G Davis	1,016		
Labour	J McLaren	965		
Liberal	M Hamilton	918		
Labour	D Evans	917		
Labour	S Andrews	854		
Majority				
Conservative hold		Swing	{{{swing}}}	
Conservative hold		Swing	{{{swing}}}	
Conservative hold		Swing	{{{swing}}}	

=== Windmill Hill ===
Windmill Hill
Party	Candidate	Votes	%	±%
Labour	C Reid	1,086		
Labour	D Poole	1,039		
Labour	G Bee	1,008		
Conservative	E Cockrell	592		
Conservative	S Simmons	565		
Conservative	W Wardle	544		
Liberal	R Hopkins	280		
Liberal	E Mottart	278		
Liberal	C Slater	248		
National Front	R Jacklin	178		
Majority				
Labour hold		Swing	{{{swing}}}	
Labour hold		Swing	{{{swing}}}	
Labour hold		Swing	{{{swing}}}	
