= Bristol City Council elections =

Local government elections in Bristol, England

Bristol City Council is the local authority for Bristol, a unitary authority and ceremonial county in England. Until 1 April 1996 it was a non-metropolitan district in Avon. From 2012 until 2024 it also had a directly elected mayor.

Because of the 2020 COVID-19 pandemic, elections for the Mayor of Bristol, Bristol City Council councillors, and the Avon and Somerset Police and Crime Commissioner were delayed from 2020 to May 2021, with post holders terms extended by a year and the following terms shortened by a year.

Composition of the council
Year	Labour	Conservative	Liberal Democrats (Note: Includes totals for the predecessors of the Liberal Democrats, the Liberal Party and SDP (both of which participated in the Alliance).)	Green	Independents & Others	Council control after election
Local government reorganisation; council established (84 seats)
1973	56	25	3	–	0	Labour
1976	47	34	3	0	0	Labour
1979	53	28	3	0	0	Labour
New ward boundaries (68 seats)
1983	30	32	6	0	0	No overall control
1984	33	29	6	0	0	No overall control
1986	35	26	7	0	0	Labour
1987	37	25	6	0	0	Labour
1988	39	24	5	0	0	Labour
1990	43	21	4	0	0	Labour
1991	45	18	5	0	0	Labour
1992	40	22	6	0	0	Labour
1994	39	19	9	0	1	Labour
1995	53	6	9	0	0	Labour
1997	52	5	11	0	0	Labour
1998	44	7	17	0	0	Labour
New ward boundaries (70 seats)
1999	37	10	23	0	0	Labour
2001	40	9	21	0	0	Labour
2002	36	10	24	0	0	Labour
2003	31	11	28	0	0	No overall control
2005	27	11	32	0	0	No overall control
2006	23	13	33	1	0	No overall control
2007	25	13	31	1	0	No overall control
2009	16	17	36	1	0	Liberal Democrats
2010	17	14	38	1	0	Liberal Democrats
2011	21	14	33	2	0	No overall control
2013	28	14	12	4	1	No overall control
2014	31	15	16	6	2	No overall control
2015	30	16	10	13	1	No overall control
New ward boundaries (70 seats)
2016	37	14	8	11	0	Labour
2021	24	14	8	24	0	No overall control
2024	21	7	8	34	0	No overall control

== Current councillors ==
Party	Councillors
Green	34
Labour	19
Liberal Democrats	9
Conservative	7
Independent	1

Ward	Party	Councillor
Ashley	Green	Izzy Russell
Ashley	Green	Abdul Malik
Ashley	Green	Tim Wye
Avonmouth & Lawrence Weston	Labour	Donald Alexander
Avonmouth & Lawrence Weston	Liberal Democrats	Zoë Peat
Avonmouth & Lawrence Weston	Labour	Tom Blenkinsop
Bedminster	Labour	Emily Clark
Bedminster	Green	Ellie Freeman
Bishopston & Ashley Down	Green	Emma Edwards
Bishopston & Ashley Down	Green	James Crawford
Bishopsworth	Conservative	Richard Eddy
Bishopsworth	Labour	Susan Kollar
Brislington East	Labour	Katja Hornchen
Brislington East	Labour	Tim Rippington
Brislington West	Liberal Democrats	Jos Clark
Brislington West	Liberal Democrats	Andrew Varney
Central	Green	Sibusiso Tshabalala
Central	Green	Ani Townsend
Clifton	Green	Jerome Thomas
Clifton	Independent	Paula O'Rourke
Clifton Down	Green	George Calascione
Clifton Down	Green	Serena Ralston
Cotham	Green	Mohamed Makawi
Cotham	Green	Guy Poultney
Easton	Green	Jenny Bartle
Easton	Green	Barry Parsons
Eastville	Green	Ed Fraser
Eastville	Green	Lorraine Francis
Filwood	Labour	Lisa Durston
Filwood	Labour	Rob Logan
Frome Vale	Labour	Louis Martin
Frome Vale	Green	Al Al-Maghrabi
Hartcliffe & Withywood	Labour	Kerry Bailes
Hartcliffe & Withywood	Labour	Kirsty Tait
Hartcliffe & Withywood	Labour	Paul Goggin
Henbury & Brentry	Conservative	Mark Weston
Henbury & Brentry	Conservative	Bador Uddin
Hengrove & Whitchurch Park	Liberal Democrats	Andrew Brown
Hengrove & Whitchurch Park	Liberal Democrats	Sarah Classick
Hengrove & Whitchurch Park	Liberal Democrats	Tim Kent
Hillfields	Labour	Kelvin Blake
Hillfields	Labour	Ellie King
Horfield	Labour	Carole Johnson
Horfield	Labour	Tom Renhard
Hotwells & Harbourside	Green	Patrick McAllister
Knowle	Green	Toby Wells
Knowle	Green	Cam Hayward
Lawrence Hill	Green	Shona Jemphrey
Lawrence Hill	Green	Yassin Mohamud
Lockleaze	Green	Heather Mack
Lockleaze	Green	David Wilcox
Redland	Green	Martin Fodor
Redland	Green	Fi Hance
Southmead	Labour	Kye Dudd
Southmead	Labour	Kaz Self
Southville	Green	Tony Dyer
Southville	Green	Christine Townsend
St George Central	Green	Abi Finch
St George Central	Green	Cara Lavan
St George Troopers Hill	Labour	Fabian Breckels
St George West	Green	Rob Bryher
Stockwood	Conservative	Jonathan Hucker
Stockwood	Conservative	Graham Morris
Stoke Bishop	Conservative	John Goulandris
Stoke Bishop	Conservative	Henry Michallat
Westbury-on-Trym & Henleaze	Liberal Democrats	Stephen Williams
Westbury-on-Trym & Henleaze	Liberal Democrats	Nicholas Coombes
Westbury-on-Trym & Henleaze	Liberal Democrats	Caroline Gooch
Windmill Hill	Green	Ed Plowden
Windmill Hill	Green	Lisa Stone

== City result maps ==
Elections in thirds results (1992-2015)
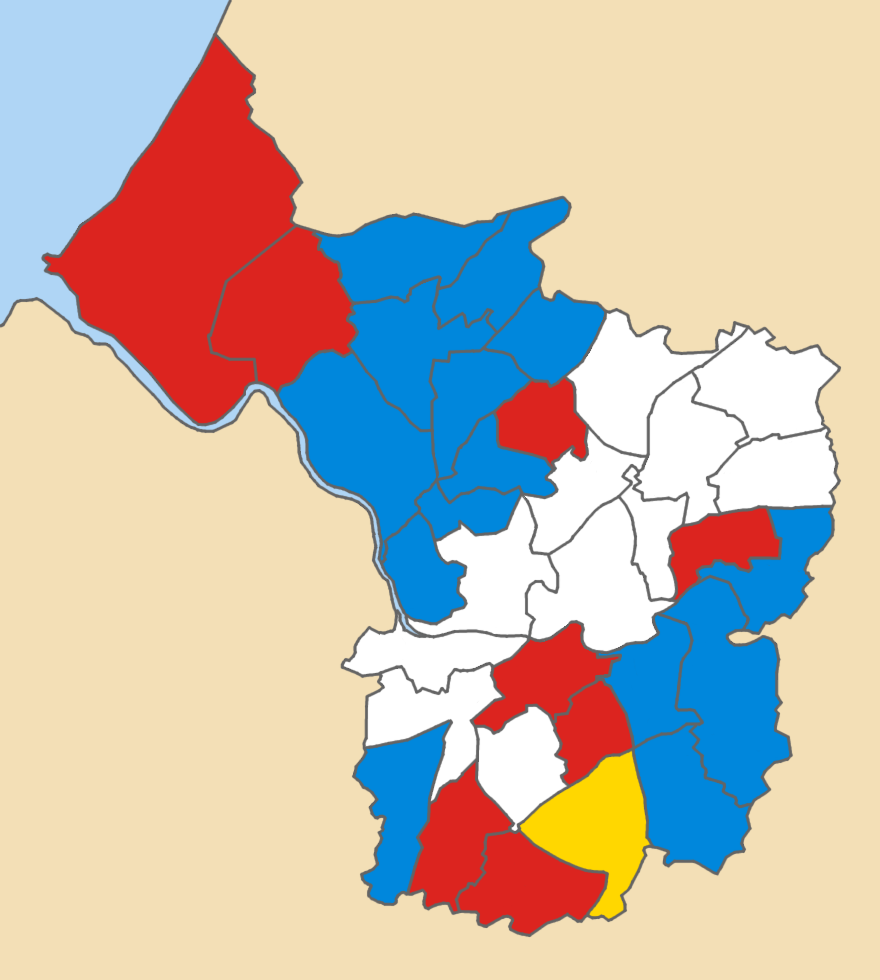
1992 results map

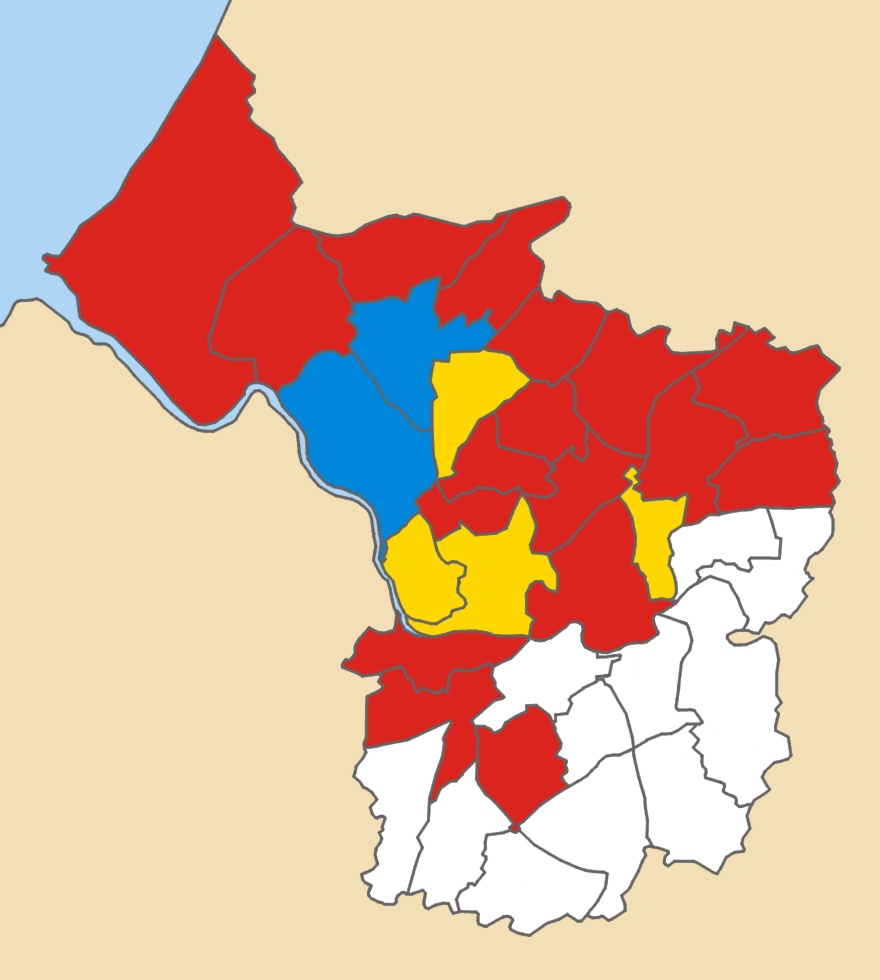
1994 results map

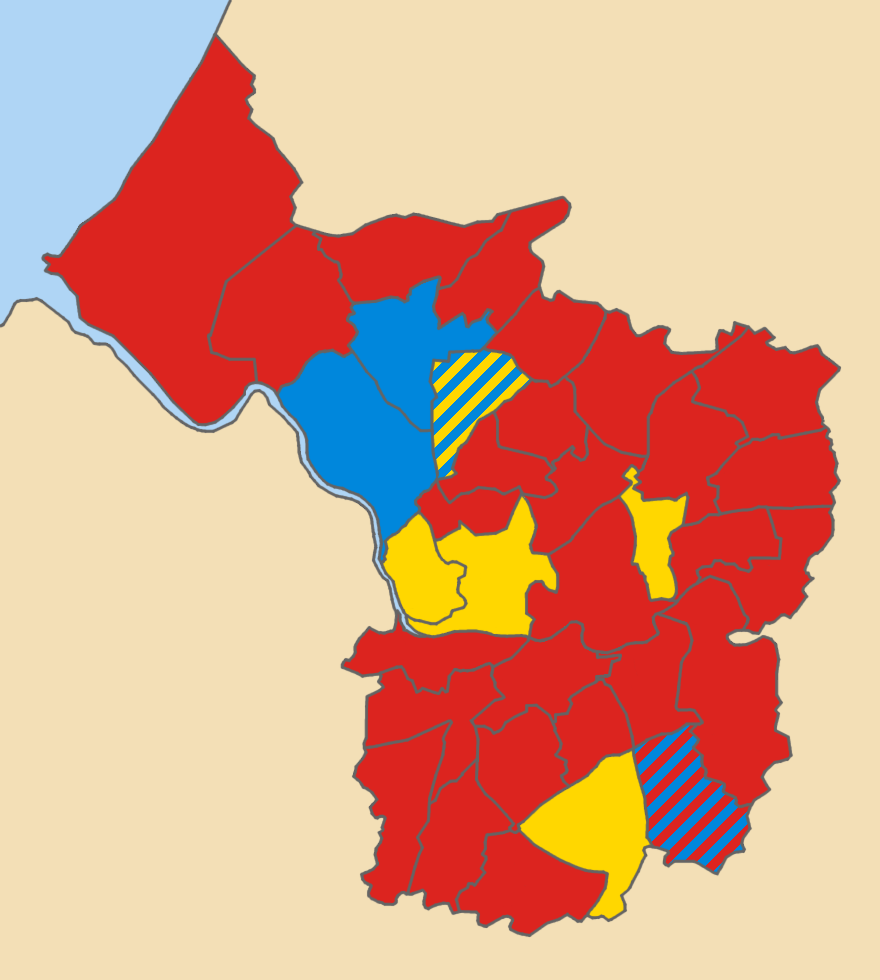
1995 results map

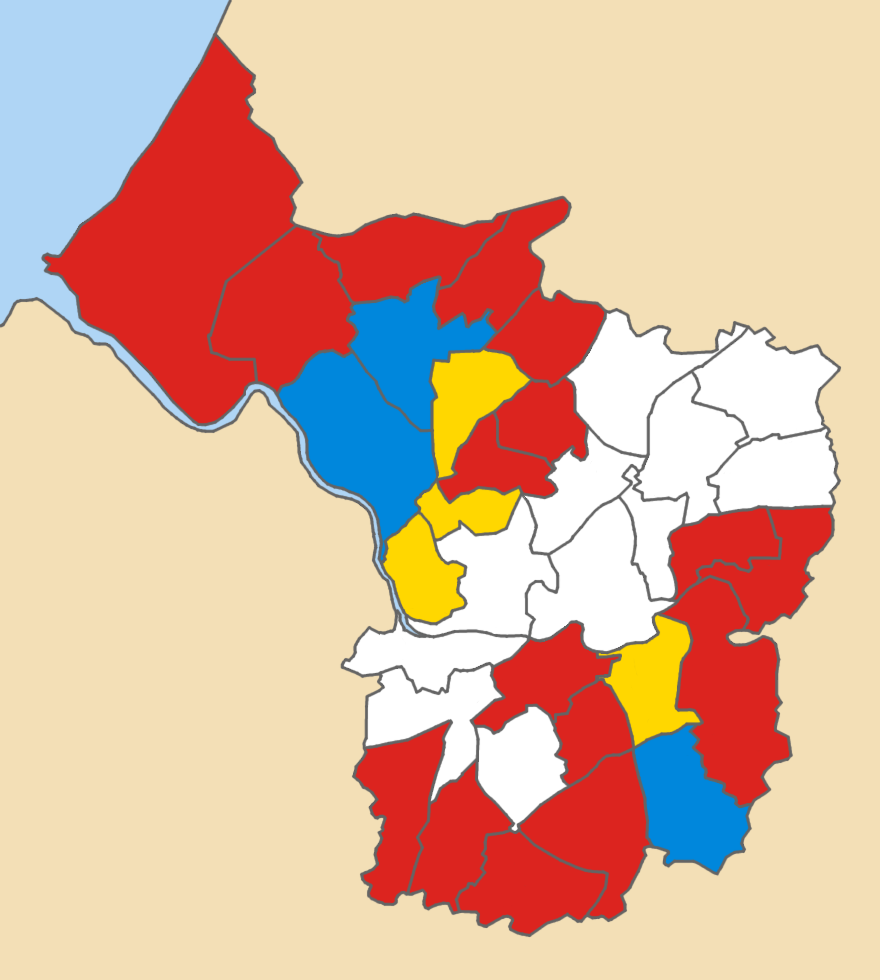
1997 results map

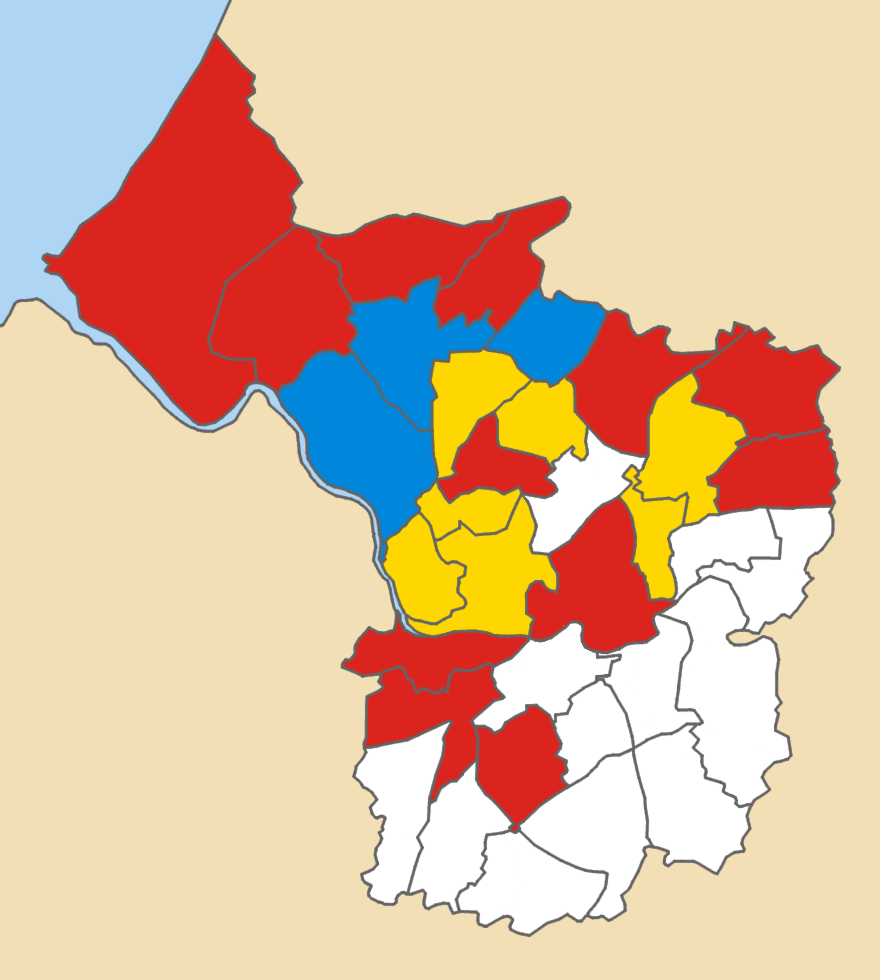
1998 results map

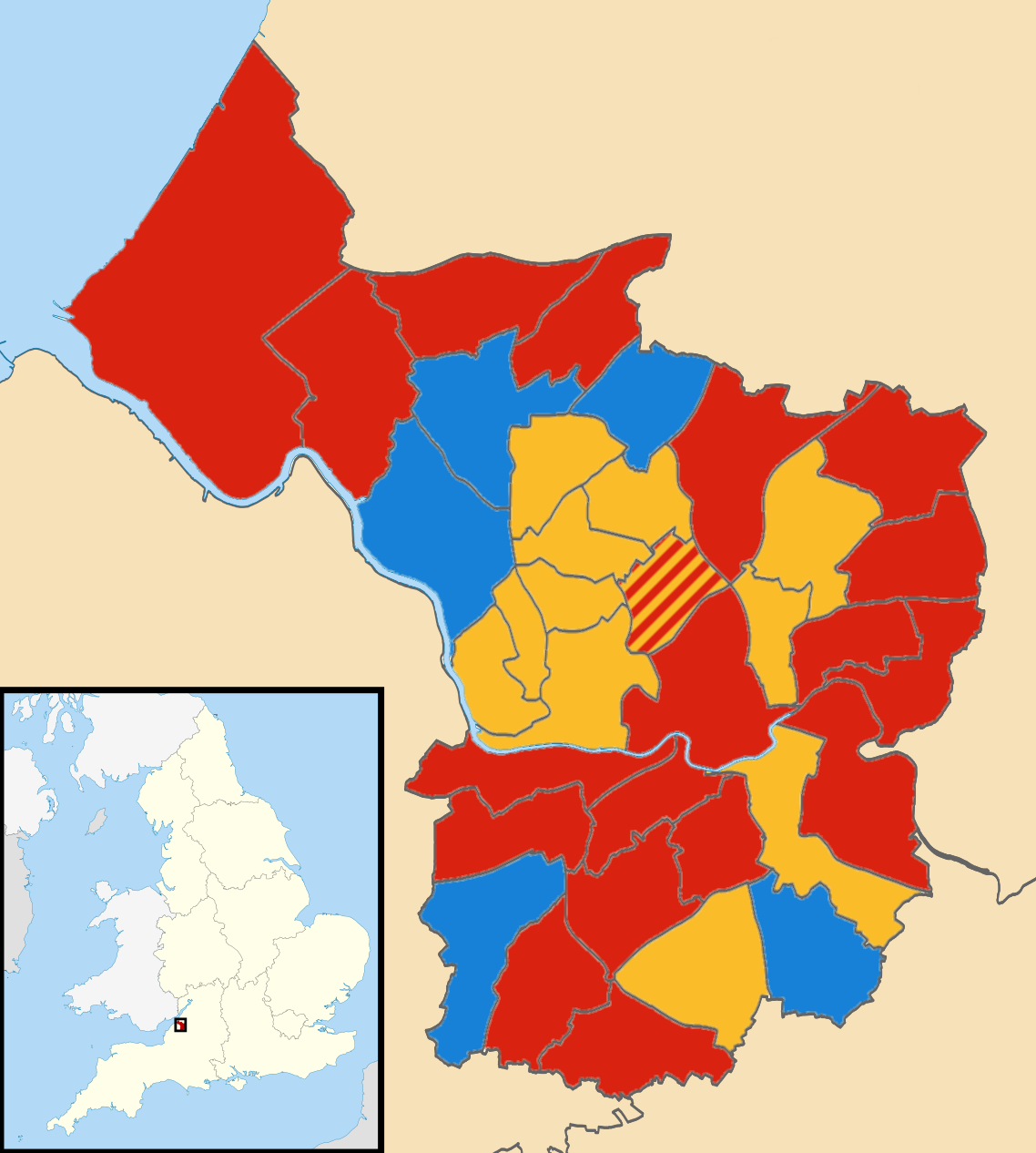
1999 results map

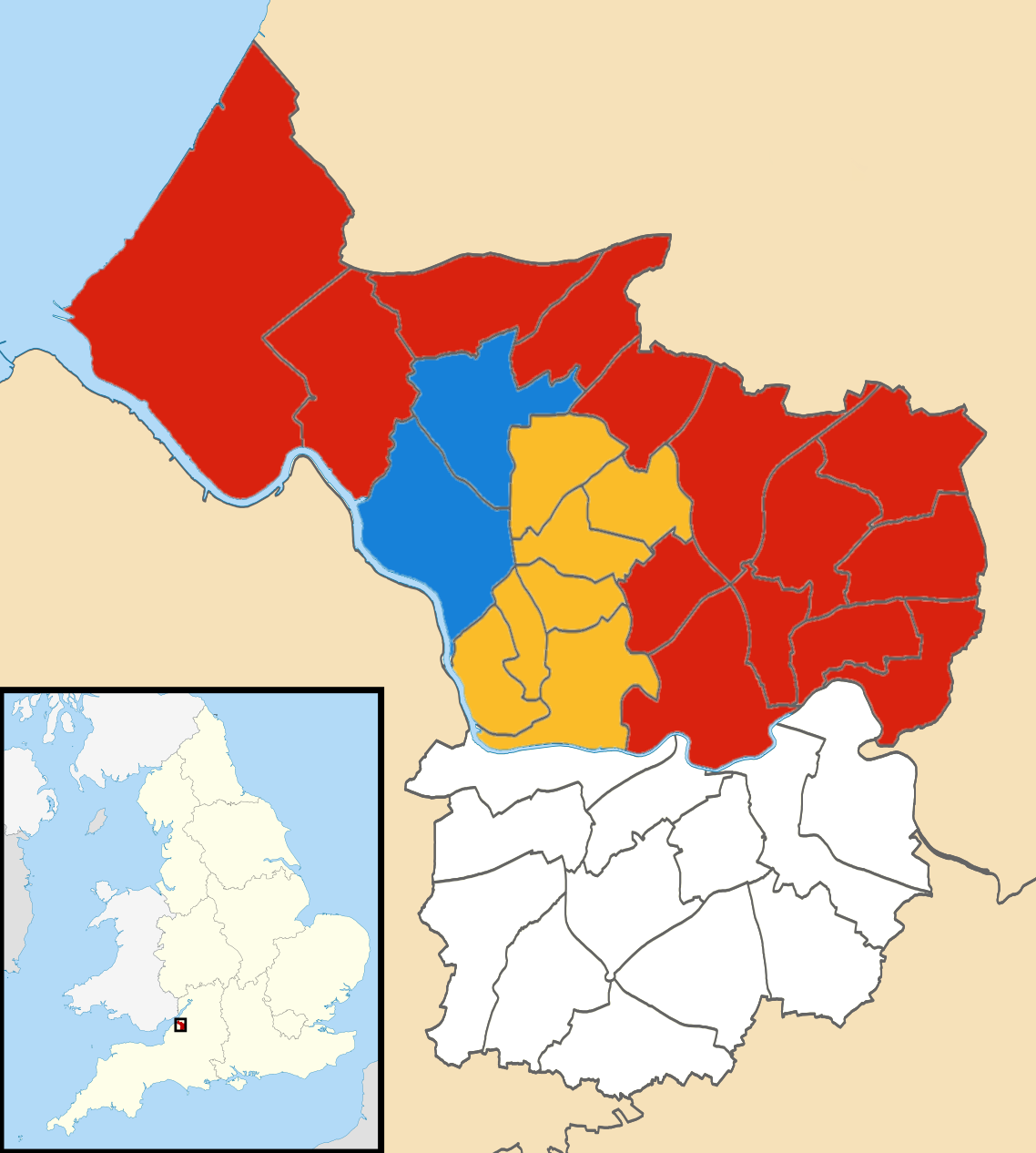
2001 results map

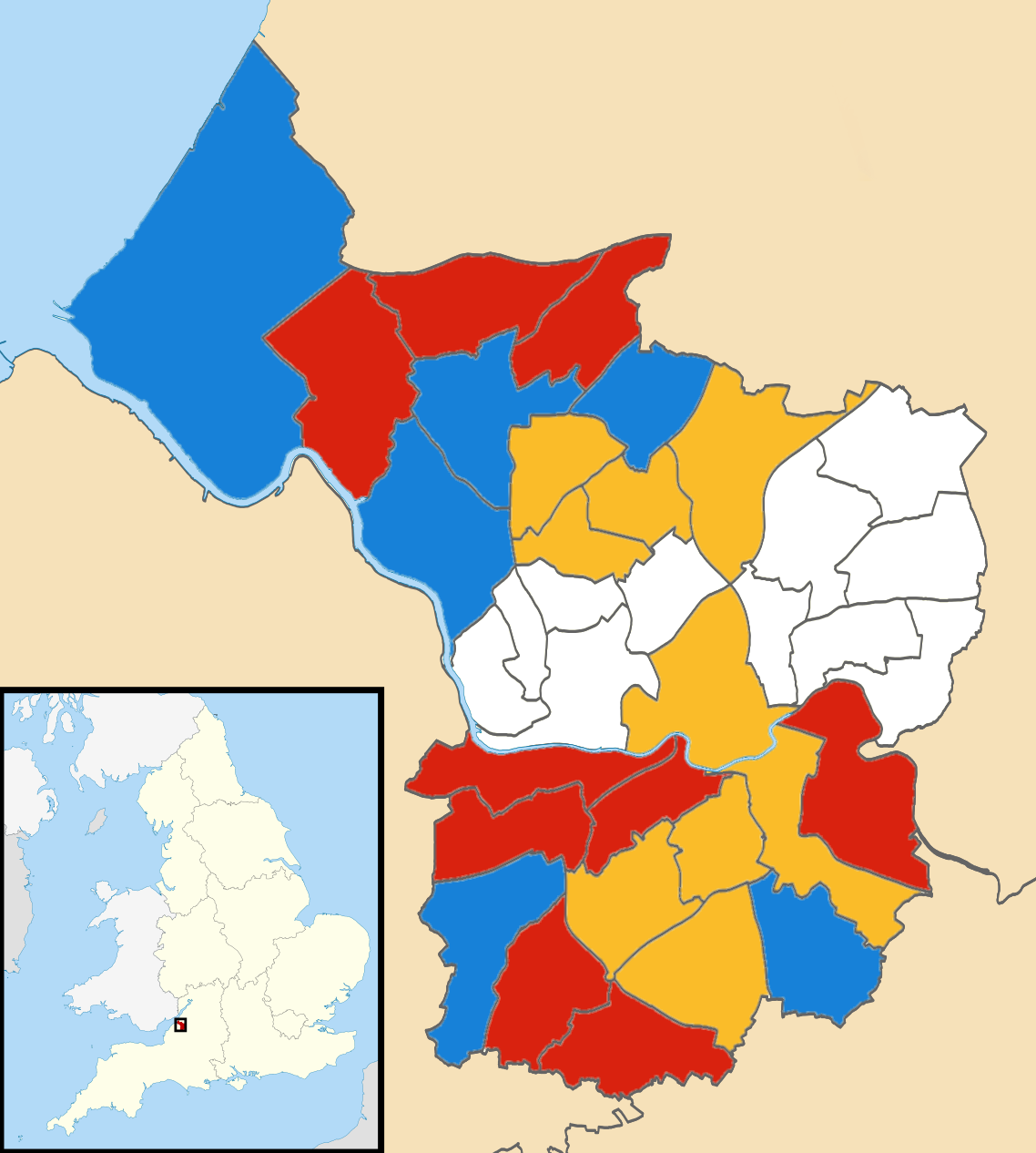
2002 results map

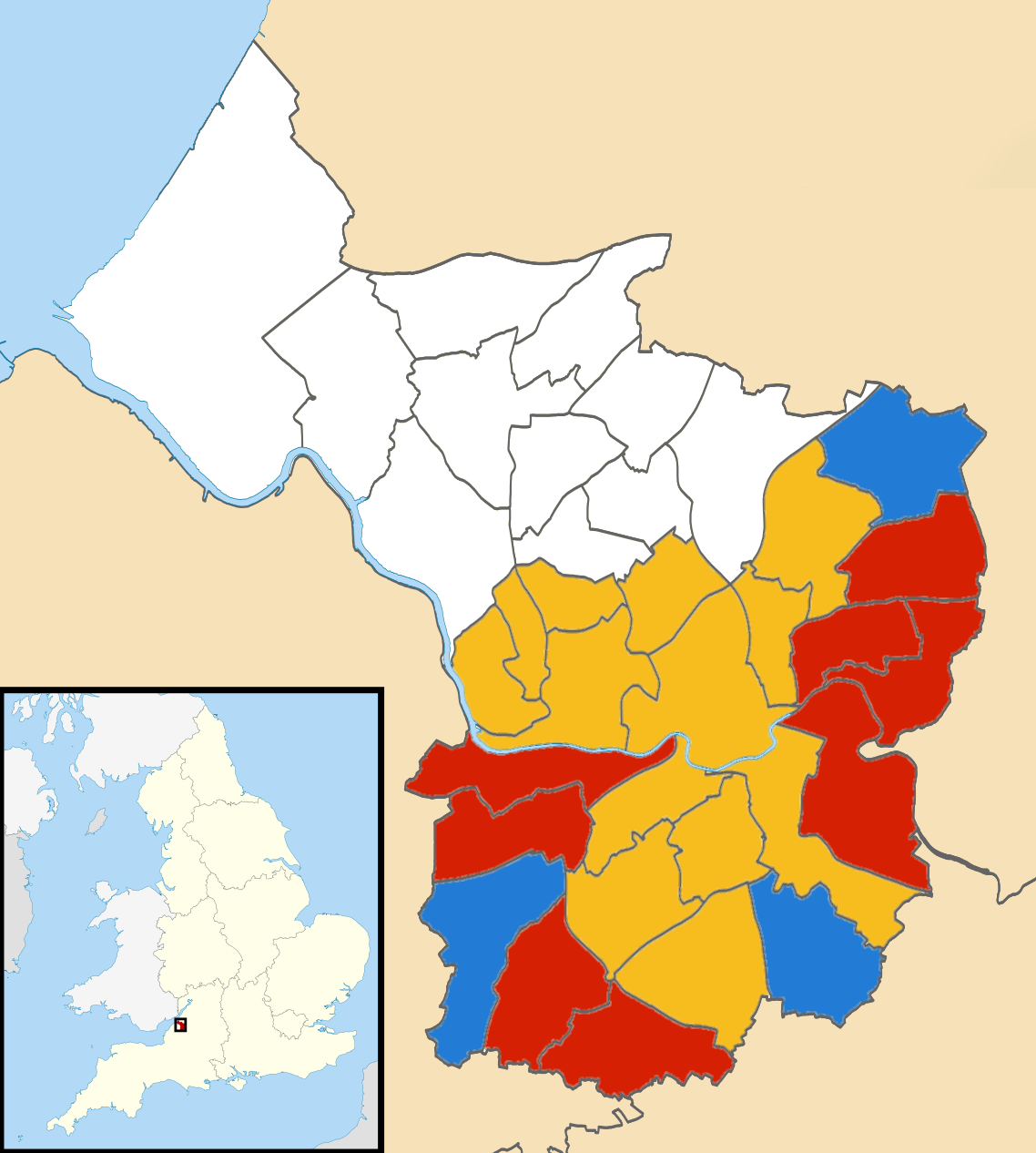
2003 results map

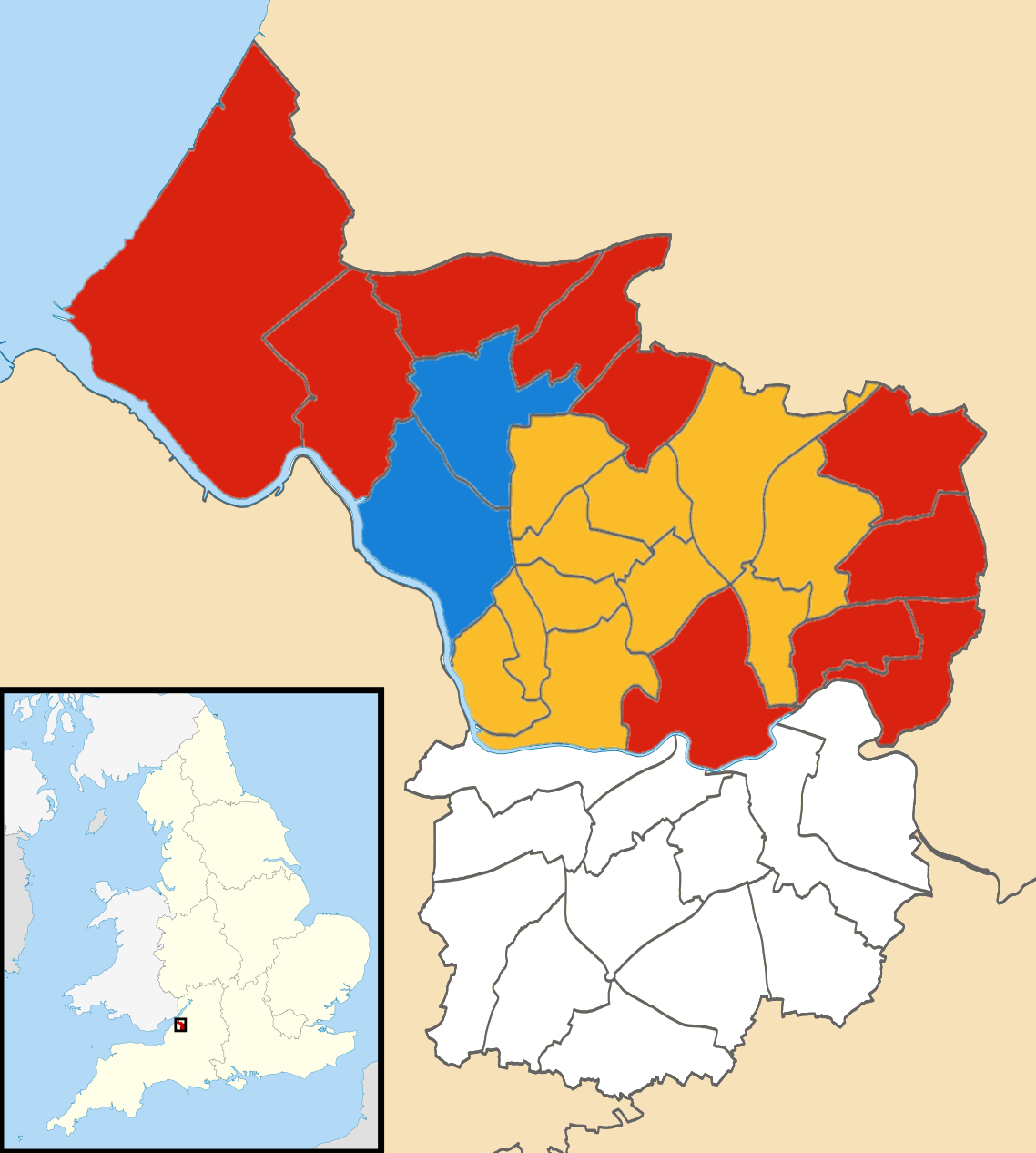
2005 results map

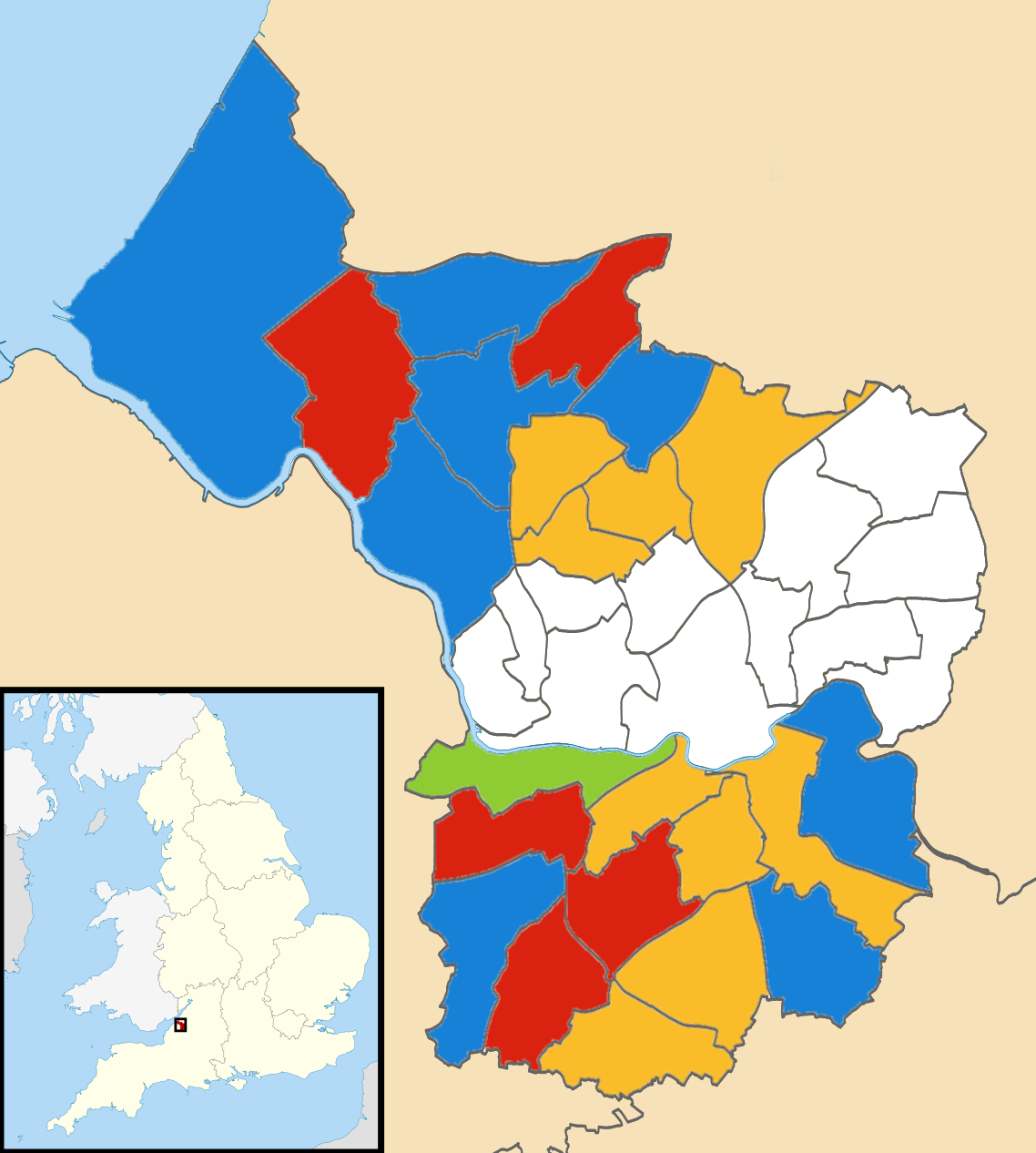
2006 results map

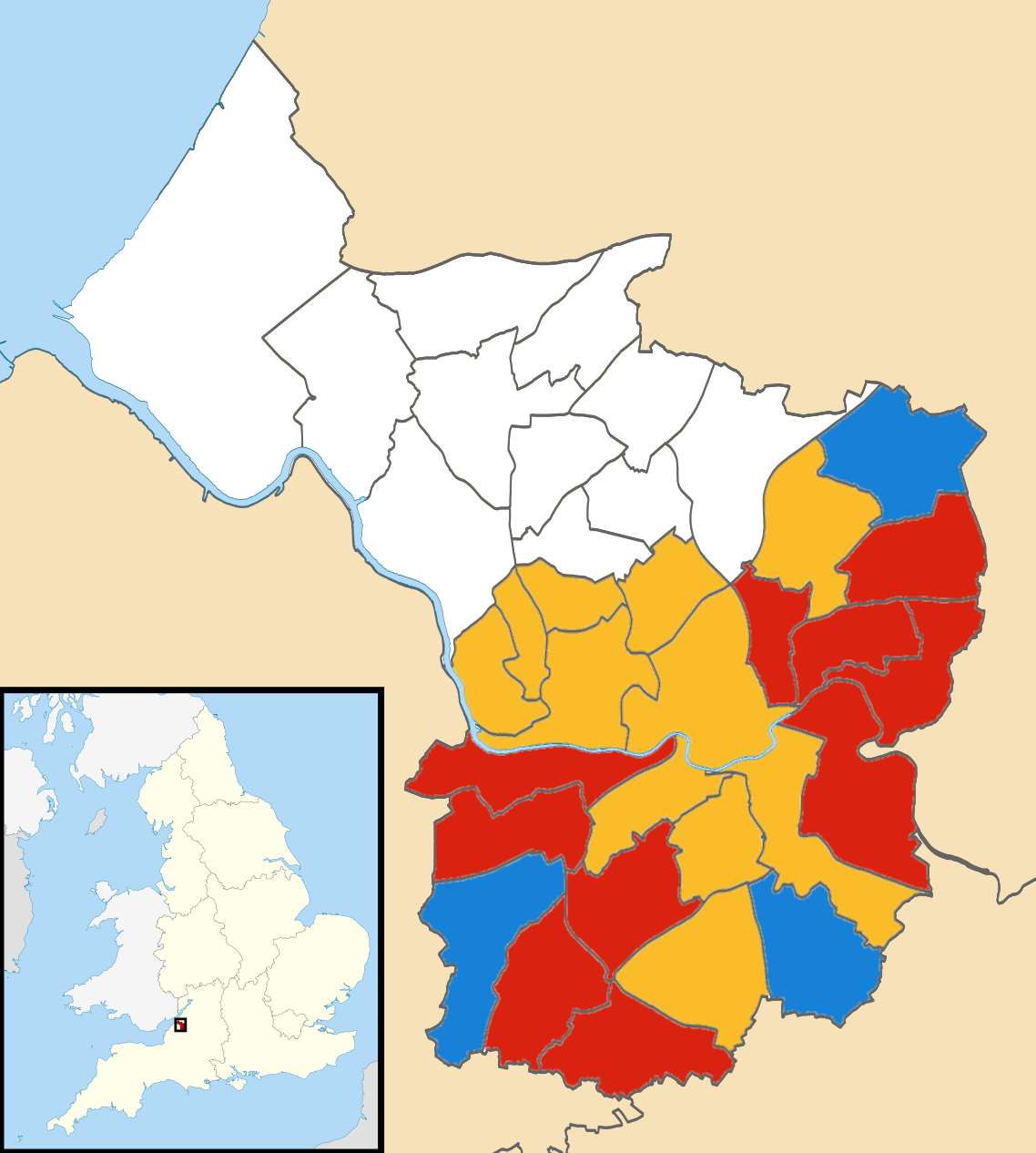
2007 results map

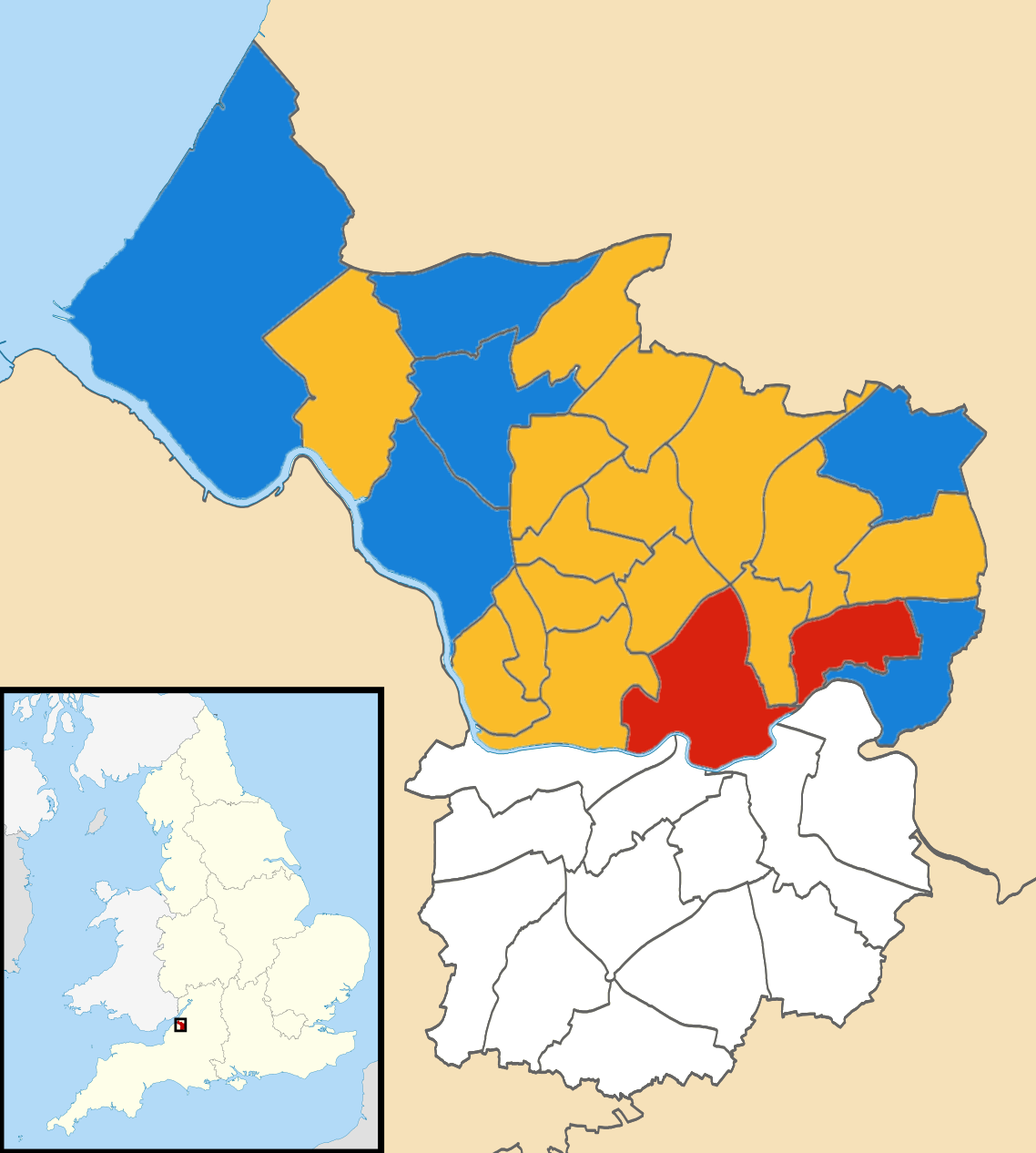
2009 results map

2010 results map

2011 results map

2013 results map

2014 results map

2015 results map
All-up election results (2016-present)
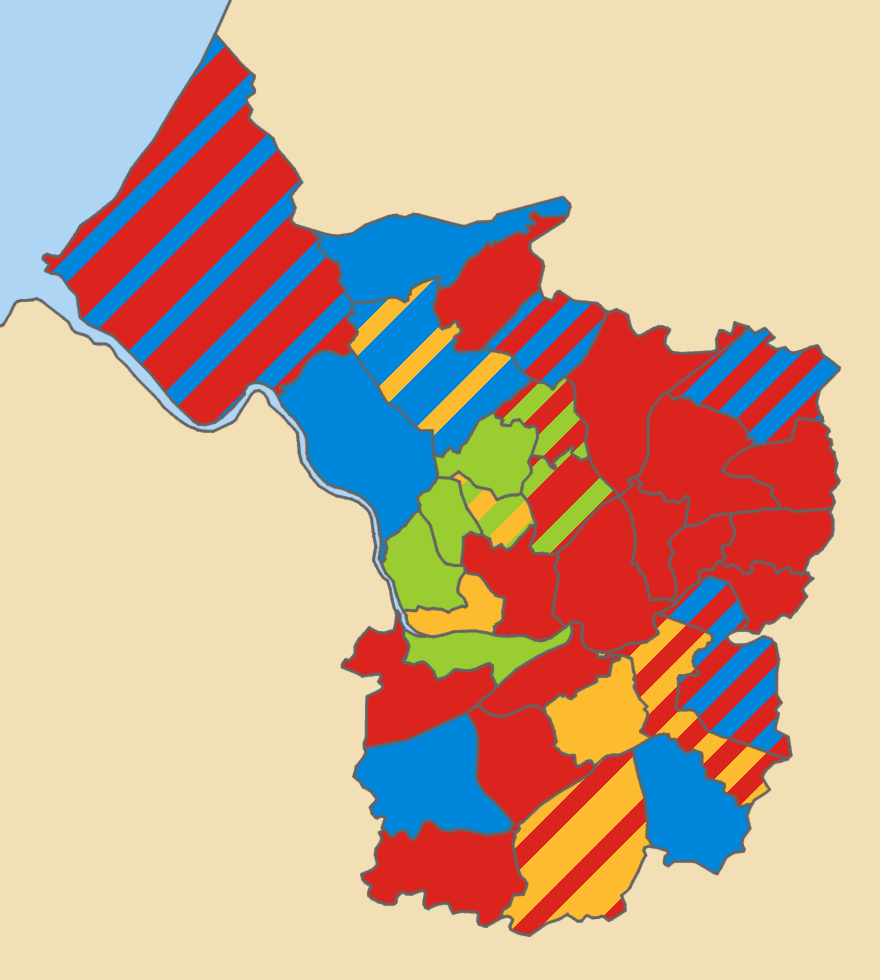
2016 results map

2021 results map

2024 results map
Graph plots of results
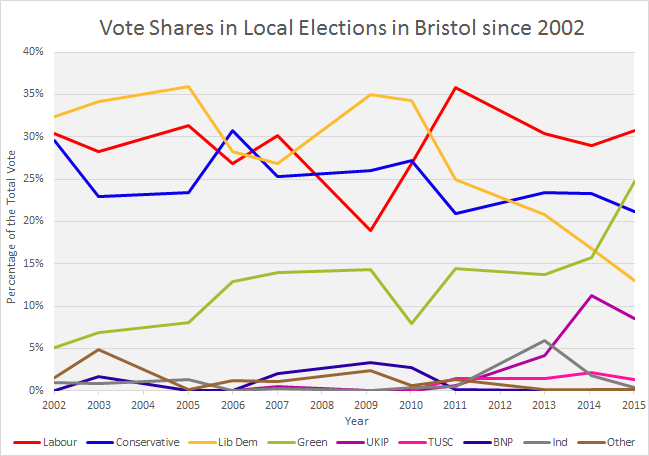
Local Election Vote Share in Bristol 2002-2015

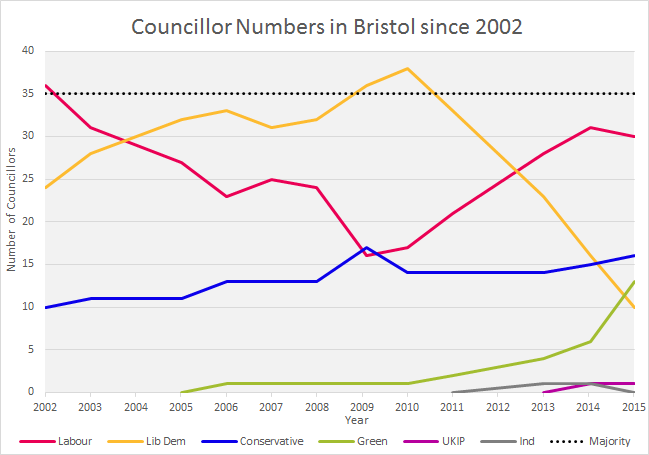
Political Make-up of Bristol City Council 2002-2015

== By-election results ==
=== 1995-1999 ===
Brislington West By-Election 17 June 1997
Party	Candidate	Votes	%	±%
Liberal Democrats	Jacqueline Edna Norman	1,453	52.5	+11.6
Labour	Jane Veronica Painter	1,002	36.2	−0.6
Conservative	Robert Andrew Britton	310	11.2	−8.6
Green	Mary Beryl Wood	47	1.7	
Socialist Labour	Paul Francis Williams	16	0.6	
Majority		451	16.3	
Turnout		2,765	32.0	
Liberal Democrats gain from Labour		Swing	+6.1	

Cabot By-Election 12 March 1998
Party	Candidate	Votes	%	±%
Liberal Democrats	Anne White	1,035	59.4	+18.0
Labour	Alison Claire Wilson	392	22.5	−12.6
Conservative	Ashley Peter Fox	250	14.4	−1.0
Green	Charles Nicholas Bolton	65	3.7	−4.5
Socialist Labour	Kay Sandra Carter	59	3.4	+3.4
Majority		643	36.9	
Turnout		1,801	17.1	
Liberal Democrats hold		Swing	+15.3	

Ashley By-Election 18 June 1998
Party	Candidate	Votes	%	±%
Liberal Democrats	Trevor Ernest Riddlestone	812	38.6	+24.6
Labour	Raymond John Sefia	694	33.0	−29.9
Socialist Labour	Bernard Joseph Kennedy	263	12.5	+12.5
Green	David Mark Simpson	222	10.6	−4.6
Conservative	Richard Jonathan Chambers	111	5.3	−2.7
Majority		118	5.6	
Turnout		2,102	25.8	
Liberal Democrats gain from Labour		Swing	+27.3	

=== 1999-2003 ===
Lockleaze By-Election 10 February 2000
Party	Candidate	Votes	%	±%
Liberal Democrats	Sean Emmett	1,288	52.4	+28.7
Labour	Kathleen Rosalie Walker	888	36.1	−12.7
Conservative	Lewis William Price	283	11.5	−9.8
Majority		400	16.3	
Turnout		2,459	30.9	
Liberal Democrats gain from Labour		Swing	+20.7	

Southville By-Election 19 October 2000
Party	Candidate	Votes	%	±%
Labour	Josephine Hargreaves	1,415	43.7	−8.6
Liberal Democrats	Jon Freeman	1,076	33.2	+17.0
Conservative	Philip Arthur Cobbold	529	16.3	−0.8
Green	Charles Nicholas Bolton	160	4.9	−7.1
Socialist Alliance	Peter Henry Wearden	58	1.8	−0.6
Majority		339	10.5	
Turnout		3,238	39.8	
Labour hold		Swing	-12.8	

=== 2003-2007 ===
Lawrence Hill By-Election 20 May 2004
Party	Candidate	Votes	%	±%
Liberal Democrats	Sue O'Donnell	961	41.2	−5.1
Labour	Diane Elizabeth Bunyan	879	37.7	+2.6
Conservative	Seva Singh	148	6.4	+0.4
Bristolian	Julien George Weston	127	5.5	−3.2
Green	Michael Crawford	127	5.5	+1.6
UKIP	Ilse Elisabeth Temple	88	3.8	+3.8
Majority		82	3.5	
Turnout		2,330	28.0	
Liberal Democrats hold		Swing	-3.9	

=== 2007-2011 ===
St George West By-Election 9 October 2008
Party	Candidate	Votes	%	±%
Liberal Democrats	Tony Potter	924	34.0	+9.1
Labour	Kevin Herniman	816	30.1	−8.1
Conservative	Colin Bretherton	509	18.8	−18.1
Independent	Angelo Agathangelou	257	9.5	+9.5
Green	Nick Foster	116	4.3	+4.3
English Democrat	Michael Blundell	93	3.4	+3.4
Majority		107	3.9	
Turnout		2,720	32.9	
Liberal Democrats gain from Labour		Swing	8.6	

=== 2011-2016 ===
Southmead By-Election 8 September 2011
Party	Candidate	Votes	%	±%
Labour	Brenda Massey	1,109	45.5	+14.1
Conservative	Ronda Brace	765	31.4	+12.5
Liberal Democrats	Barry Cash	365	15.0	−17.1
Green	Chris Millman	120	4.9	−1.3
English Democrat	Stephen Wright	77	3.2	−8.3
Majority		344		
Turnout		2,443	28.6	
Labour gain from Liberal Democrats		Swing		

=== 2016-2020 ===
Westbury-on-Trym and Henleaze By-Election 24 May 2018
Party	Candidate	Votes	%	±%
Conservative	Stephen James Smith	2,900	42.3	+2.9
Liberal Democrats	Graham Christopher Donald	2,704	39.5	+7.3
Labour	Teresa Ann Stratford	891	13.0	−2.6
Green	Ian Edward Moss	355	5.2	−7.6
Majority		196	2.8	
Turnout		6,850	44.9	
Conservative gain from Liberal Democrats		Swing		

Brislington East By-Election 16 January 2020
Party	Candidate	Votes	%	±%
Labour	Timothy Charles Rippington	865	39.7	+1.4
Conservative	Richard Peter Williams	647	29.7	–4.1
Liberal Democrats	Tara AA Murray	486	22.3	+12.7
Green	Isaac Price-Sosner	179	8.2	–4.1
Majority		218	10.0	
Turnout		2,177	23.6	
Labour hold		Swing		

=== 2021-2024 ===
Southmead By-Election 17 February 2022
Party	Candidate	Votes	%	±%
Labour	Kye Dudd	780	41.25	−3.40
Green	Ed Burnham	728	38.50	+19.08
Conservative	Roddy Jaques	279	14.75	−9.46
Liberal Democrats	Gill Brooks	82	4.34	−2.98
TUSC	Tom Baldwin	22	1.16	+1.16
Majority		52	2.8	
Turnout		1,891	21.2	
Labour hold		Swing		

Hotwells and Harbourside By-Election 2 February 2023
Party	Candidate	Votes	%	±%
Green	Patrick McAllister	537	43.0	+11.4
Liberal Democrats	Stephen Williams	511	40.9	+8.0
Labour	Beryl Means	153	12.2	−12.8
Conservative	Eliana Barbosa	34	2.7	−6.5
Independent	Martin Booth (Note: Martin Booth announced that he had withdrawn his candidacy on 13 January, however he still appeared on the final ballot paper.)	14	1.1	+1.1
Majority		26	2.1	
Turnout		1,249		
Green gain from Liberal Democrats				

Bishopston and Ashley Down By-Election 24 August 2023
Party	Candidate	Votes	%	±%
Green	James Crawford	1,294	50.2	−3.2
Labour	Andrew Milton	981	38.1	+10.6
Liberal Democrats	Barry Cash	184	7.1	−5.5
Conservative	Roddy Jaques	91	3.5	−3.0
Trade Unionist and Socialist Coalition	Amy Sage	26	1.0	+1.0
Majority		313	12.2	
Turnout		2,576		
Green hold				

=== 2024-2028 ===
Horfield By-Election 4 July 2024
Party	Candidate	Votes	%	±%
Labour	Carole Johnson	2,367	40.1	
Green	Anna Meares	2,264	38.4	
Conservative	Sharon Scott	778	13.2	
Liberal Democrats	Roxanne Lock	407	6.9	
TUSC	Joan Molins	83	1.4	
Majority		103	1.7	
Turnout		5899	61.0	
Labour hold		Swing		
