= 1994 Bristol City Council election =

1994 UK local government election

← 1992	5 May 1994	1995 →

23 of 68 seats (one third) to Bristol City Council 35 seats needed for a majority
	First party	Second party	Third party
Party	Labour	Conservative	Liberal Democrats
Seats won	40	20	8
Seat change	Steady	▼3	▲3
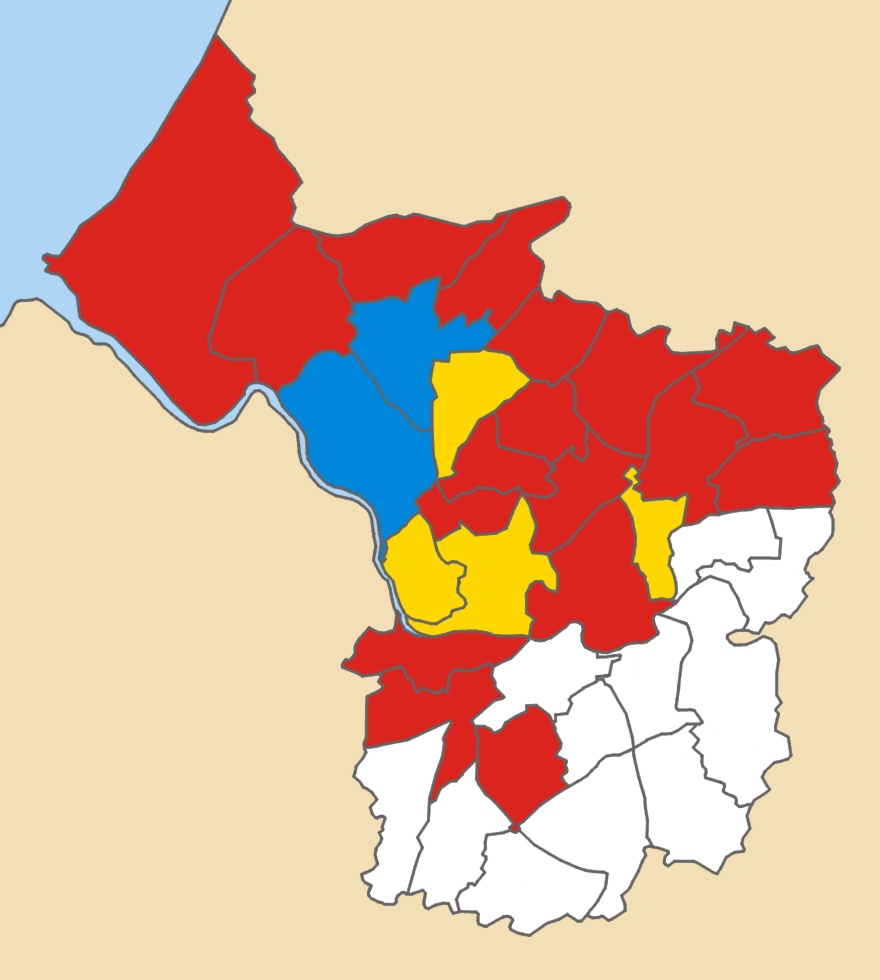
- 1994 local election results in Bristol
Council control before election
Labour Party (UK)
Council control after election
Labour Party (UK)

The 1994 Bristol City Council election took place on 5 May 1994 to elect members of Bristol City Council in England. This was on the same day as other local elections. One third of seats were up for election. The Bristol Party was formed by Bristol Rovers fans to campaign for a new stadium for the club. There was a general swing from the Conservatives and Greens to the Liberal Democrats, reflecting the beginning of the Conservative decline nationally and also the Liberal Democrat recovery after the merger troubles.

== Ward results ==
The change is calculated using the results when these actual seats were last contested, i.e. the 1990 election.

=== Ashley ===
Ashley
Party	Candidate	Votes	%	±%
Labour	N.I. Barton	1,740	60.5	+4.4
Liberal Democrats	G.K. Hughes	413	14.4	+7.6
Green	D.M. Simpson	367	13.5	−12.4
Conservative	J. Eastwood	337	11.7	+0.5
Majority		1,327	46.1	
Labour hold		Swing	-1.6	

=== Avonmouth ===
Avonmouth
Party	Candidate	Votes	%	±%
Labour	C.M. Lukins	2,288	64.3	−3.5
Conservative	I.D. Millard	756	21.2	−2.2
Liberal Democrats	P.W. Lloyd	517	14.5	+14.5
Majority		1,532	43.1	
Labour hold		Swing	-0.7	

=== Bedminster ===
Bedminster
Party	Candidate	Votes	%	±%
Labour	C.M. Warren	1,674	52.6	−4.8
Conservative	J. Lopresti	699	22.0	−1.0
Liberal Democrats	M. Sykes	677	21.3	+8.1
Green	A. Lewis	132	4.1	−2.3
Majority		1,175	30.6	
Labour hold		Swing	-1.9	

=== Bishopston ===
Bishopston
Party	Candidate	Votes	%	±%
Labour	H. Bashforth	1,947	42.9	−2.1
Liberal Democrats	D.J.G. Kitson	1,324	29.1	+7.4
Conservative	A.S. Waycott	841	18.5	−4.2
Bristol Party	E.A. Chappell	254	5.6	+5.6
Green	J.M. Quinnell	177	3.9	−6.7
Majority		623	13.7	
Labour hold		Swing	-4.2	

=== Cabot ===
Cabot
Party	Candidate	Votes	%	±%
Liberal Democrats	C.R. Boney	1,648	47.2	+13.0
Labour	P.A. Garland	1,089	31.2	−2.3
Conservative	A.P. Fox	582	16.7	−4.3
Green	P.J. North	173	5.0	−6.3
Majority		559	16.0	
Liberal Democrats hold		Swing	+7.7	

=== Clifton ===
Clifton
Party	Candidate	Votes	%	±%
Liberal Democrats	B.H. Price	2,001	47.2	+32.4
Conservative	J. Bretten	1,515	35.7	−1.3
Labour	N.J. Currie	571	13.5	−9.4
Green	L.S. Hersey	153	3.6	−21.7
Majority		486	11.5	
Liberal Democrats gain from Conservative		Swing	+16.9	

=== Cotham ===
Cotham
Party	Candidate	Votes	%	±%
Labour	C.M. Taylor	1,491	39.3	+2.5
Conservative	N.C. Tolchard	1,126	29.6	−4.3
Liberal Democrats	P.M.W. Case	1,015	26.7	+13.5
Green	G. Collard	166	4.4	−11.8
Majority		365	9.6	
Labour hold		Swing	+3.4	

=== Easton ===
Easton
Party	Candidate	Votes	%	±%
Liberal Democrats	J.F. Kiely	1,736	49.0	+17.2
Labour	R. Moss	1,387	39.2	−12.3
Bristol Party	I.C.S. Vickery	181	5.1	+5.1
Conservative	C.R. Bretherton	134	3.8	−4.6
Green	S.M. Jeffery	104	2.9	−5.4
Majority		349	9.9	
Liberal Democrats gain from Labour		Swing	+14.8	

=== Eastville ===
Eastville
Party	Candidate	Votes	%	±%
Labour	S.J. Andrews	1,584	43.1	−4.3
Conservative	T.C. Collins	894	24.3	−9.4
Bristol Party	A.J. Locke	574	15.6	+15.6
Liberal Democrats	P.R. Potts	541	14.7	+3.3
Green	R. Nicholls	84	2.3	−5.2
Majority		690	18.8	
Labour hold		Swing	+2.6	

=== Filwood ===
Filwood
Party	Candidate	Votes	%	±%
Labour	D.J. Bryan	1,156	58.6	−5.6
Militant Labour	I.P. Marshall	397	20.1	+20.1
Liberal Democrats	J.M. Nichol	215	10.9	+10.9
Conservative	S.M. Willis	166	8.5	+8.5
Green	G.H. Davey	40	2.0	−8.7
Majority		759	38.4	
Labour hold		Swing	-12.9	

=== Frome Vale ===
Frome Vale
Party	Candidate	Votes	%	±%
Labour	M.P. Langley	1,870	42.8	−9.4
Conservative	V.C. Eaglestone	1,113	25.5	−5.5
Liberal Democrats	W.G. Barrett	843	19.3	+10.0
Bristol Party	R.J. Sparks	541	12.4	+12.4
Majority		757	17.3	
Labour hold		Swing	-2.0	

=== Henbury ===
Henbury
Party	Candidate	Votes	%	±%
Labour	J.D. Fisk	1,957	51.6	−4.8
Conservative	A.J. Smith	942	24.9	−1.2
Liberal Democrats	J.R. Culliford	516	13.6	+2.9
Bristol Party	S.J.F. Burns	374	9.9	+9.9
Majority		1,015	26.9	
Labour hold		Swing	-1.8	

=== Henleaze ===
Henleaze
Party	Candidate	Votes	%	±%
Liberal Democrats	R.M. Brown	2,330	49.4	+30.5
Conservative	G.J.P. Browne	1,777	37.7	−13.9
Labour	K. Evans	484	10.3	−8.8
Green	D.N. Wall	127	2.7	−7.8
Majority		553	11.7	
Liberal Democrats gain from Conservative		Swing	+22.2	

=== Hillfields ===
Hillfields
Party	Candidate	Votes	%	±%
Labour	J.D. Naysmith	1,734	55.8	−4.0
Liberal Democrats	J.P. Corrigan	483	15.6	+3.9
Conservative	A.D. Seville	461	14.8	−3.8
Bristol Party	D.J. Down	428	13.8	+13.8
Majority		1,251	40.3	
Labour hold		Swing	-4.0	

=== Horfield ===
Horfield
Party	Candidate	Votes	%	±%
Labour	D.R. Poole	1,694	43.1	−0.2
Conservative	L.G. Collison	1,239	31.5	−8.5
Liberal Democrats	S.E. Young	534	13.6	+2.0
Bristol Party	A.F. Poole	392	10.0	+10.0
Green	P.M. Scott	75	1.9	−3.2
Majority		455	11.6	
Labour hold		Swing	+4.2	

=== Kingsweston ===
Kingsweston
Party	Candidate	Votes	%	±%
Labour	R. Clarke	2,017	60.1	+0.8
Conservative	J. Veale	802	23.9	−0.4
Liberal Democrats	F.R. Young	538	16.0	+3.8
Majority		1,215	36.2	
Labour hold		Swing	+0.6	

=== Lawrence Hill ===
Lawrence Hill
Party	Candidate	Votes	%	±%
Labour	R.J. Channon	1,743	61.7	−9.8
Liberal Democrats	G.L. Williams	368	13.0	+4.2
Bristol Party	P.D. Burrows	363	12.8	+12.8
Conservative	H. Richmond	249	8.8	−3.5
Green	N.E. Whittingham	102	3.6	−3.8
Majority		1,375	48.7	
Labour hold		Swing	-7.0	

=== Lockleaze ===
Lockleaze
Party	Candidate	Votes	%	±%
Labour	J. Patterson	1,646	53.6	−12.7
Liberal Democrats	J. Grace	756	24.6	+13.0
Conservative	A. Low	370	12.0	−4.5
Bristol Party	V.F. Kemp	300	9.8	+9.8
Majority		890	29.0	
Labour hold		Swing	-12.9	

=== Redland ===
Redland
Party	Candidate	Votes	%	±%
Labour	J.B. McLaren	1,750	39.0	+2.4
Conservative	I.E. Temple	1,323	29.5	−7.3
Liberal Democrats	D.J. Richer	1,203	26.8	+12.5
Green	G. Nicholas	208	4.6	−11.7
Majority		427	9.5	
Labour gain from Conservative		Swing	+4.9	

=== Southmead ===
Southmead
Party	Candidate	Votes	%	±%
Labour	P.W. Hammond	1,547	53.8	−7.7
Conservative	J. Abdalla	503	17.5	−3.9
Liberal Democrats	S.R. Young	418	14.5	+5.5
Bristol Party	J.S. Steynings	405	14.1	+14.1
Majority		1,044	36.3	
Labour hold		Swing	-1.9	

=== Southville ===
Southville
Party	Candidate	Votes	%	±%
Labour	T. Coombes	1,929	58.6	+0.8
Liberal Democrats	R.F. Hughes	626	19.0	+8.6
Conservative	C.A.P. Stephenson	557	16.9	−4.1
Green	C.N. Bolton	180	5.5	−5.3
Majority		1,303	39.6	
Labour hold		Swing	-3.9	

=== Stoke Bishop ===
Stoke Bishop
Party	Candidate	Votes	%	±%
Conservative	P.J. Abraham	2,264	53.0	+0.3
Liberal Democrats	E.A. Carpenter	1,282	30.0	+10.6
Labour	G.E. Waddington	594	13.9	−4.9
Green	P.A.E. Small	133	3.1	−6.0
Majority		982	23.0	
Conservative hold		Swing	-5.2	

=== Westbury-on-Trym ===
Westbury-on-Trym
Party	Candidate	Votes	%	±%
Conservative	D.H. Poole	2,412	54.9	−3.7
Liberal Democrats	J.H.W. Masters	1,389	31.6	+17.0
Labour	T.R. Sage	593	13.5	−3.7
Majority		1,023	23.3	
Conservative hold		Swing	-10.4	

== Sources ==
- Bristol Evening Post 6 May 1994
