= 1992 Bristol City Council election =

1992 UK local government election

| ← 1991 | 7 May 1992 | 1994 → |

24 of 68 seats (one third) to Bristol City Council 35 seats needed for a majority
| | First party | Second party | Third party |
|---|---|---|---|
| Party | Labour | Conservative | Liberal Democrats |
| Seats won | 40 | 23 | 5 |
| Seat change | ▼5 | ▲5 | Steady |
Council control before election
Labour Party (UK)
Council control after election
Labour Party (UK)

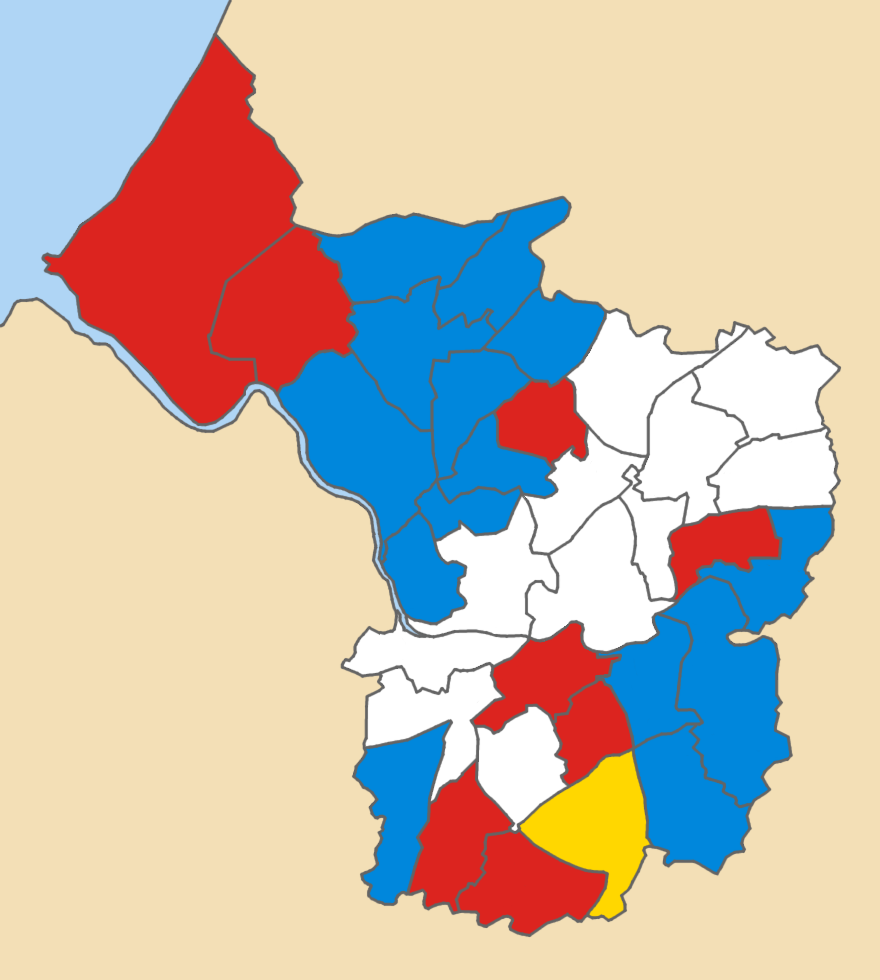
1992 local election results in Bristol

The 1992 Bristol City Council election took place on 7 May 1992 to elect members of Bristol City Council in England. This was on the same day as other local elections. One third of seats were up for election. Two seats were contested in Hartcliffe due to an extra vacancy occurring. The elections were held just weeks after John Major's unexpected 1992 General election victory, and mirroring that result there was a strong swing from Labour to Conservative.

== Ward results ==
The change is calculated using the results when these actual seats were last contested, i.e. the 1988 election.

=== Avonmouth ===
Avonmouth
| Party | Candidate | Votes | % | ±% |
|---|---|---|---|---|
| Labour | P. Gregory | 1,665 | 46.1 | −4.2 |
| Conservative | N. Tolchard | 1,639 | 45.4 | +1.4 |
| Liberal Democrats | P. Lloyd | 246 | 6.8 | +2.3 |
| Green | L. Hersey | 64 | 1.8 | +0.6 |
| Majority | | 26 | 0.7 | |
| Labour hold | | Swing | -2.8 | |

=== Bishopston ===
Bishopston
| Party | Candidate | Votes | % | ±% |
|---|---|---|---|---|
| Labour | P. McLaren | 1,648 | 37.9 | −0.1 |
| Conservative | W. Brown | 1,580 | 36.3 | +1.7 |
| Liberal Democrats | C. Primett | 949 | 21.8 | −2.9 |
| Green | J. Quinnell | 175 | 4.0 | +1.3 |
| Majority | | 68 | 1.6 | |
| Labour hold | | Swing | -0.9 | |

=== Bishopsworth ===
Bishopsworth
| Party | Candidate | Votes | % | ±% |
|---|---|---|---|---|
| Conservative | R. Eddy | 1,420 | 49.4 | +8.7 |
| Labour | J. McLaren | 1,188 | 41.4 | −7.5 |
| Liberal Democrats | P. Masters | 172 | 6.0 | +2.3 |
| Green | B. Lewis | 92 | 3.2 | +3.2 |
| Majority | | 232 | 8.1 | |
| Conservative gain from Labour | | Swing | +8.1 | |

=== Brislington East ===
Brislington East
| Party | Candidate | Votes | % | ±% |
|---|---|---|---|---|
| Conservative | A. Carey | 1,739 | 47.7 | +9.1 |
| Labour | G. Townsend | 1,565 | 42.9 | −7.8 |
| Liberal Democrats | R. Windmill | 258 | 7.0 | −1.8 |
| Green | G. Davey | 86 | 2.4 | +0.5 |
| Majority | | 174 | 4.8 | |
| Conservative gain from Labour | | Swing | +8.5 | |

=== Brislington West ===
Brislington West
| Party | Candidate | Votes | % | ±% |
|---|---|---|---|---|
| Conservative | P. Dodd | 1,409 | 38.3 | +3.5 |
| Labour | D. Herod | 1,081 | 29.4 | +1.3 |
| Liberal Democrats | J. Webb | 1,048 | 28.5 | −5.7 |
| Green | M. Turnbull | 141 | 3.8 | +1.0 |
| Majority | | 328 | 8.9 | |
| Conservative hold | | Swing | +1.1 | |

=== Clifton ===
Clifton
| Party | Candidate | Votes | % | ±% |
|---|---|---|---|---|
| Conservative | A. Tasker | 1,687 | 47.5 | 0.0 |
| Liberal Democrats | S. Spilsbury | 1,132 | 31.9 | +8.8 |
| Labour | N. Steven | 511 | 14.4 | −5.9 |
| Green | N. Campion | 218 | 6.1 | +0.7 |
| Majority | | 555 | 15.6 | |
| Conservative hold | | Swing | -4.4 | |

=== Cotham ===
Cotham
| Party | Candidate | Votes | % | ±% |
|---|---|---|---|---|
| Conservative | A. Orr | 1,523 | 44.3 | −0.4 |
| Labour | L. Broomhead | 1,019 | 29.6 | −0.3 |
| Liberal Democrats | M. Bosel | 685 | 19.9 | +5.3 |
| Green | G. Collard | 211 | 6.1 | −0.8 |
| Majority | | 504 | 14.7 | |
| Conservative hold | | Swing | -0.1 | |

=== Hartcliffe ===
Hartcliffe - 2 seats
| Party | Candidate | Votes | % | ±% |
|---|---|---|---|---|
| Labour | T. Cleverley | 1,191 | 45.6 | −17.1 |
| Labour | M. Hulin | 907 | | |
| Conservative | P. Eddy | 864 | 33.1 | +4.8 |
| Liberal Democrats | V. Bartlett | 403 | 15.4 | +8.3 |
| Liberal Democrats | R. Kirkham | 206 | | |
| Green | C. Bolton | 152 | 5.8 | +4.0 |
| Majority | | 43 | 1.6 | |
| Labour hold | | Swing | -11.0 | |

=== Henbury ===
Henbury
| Party | Candidate | Votes | % | ±% |
|---|---|---|---|---|
| Conservative | D. Miller | 1,904 | 49.2 | +10.0 |
| Labour | J. Patterson | 1,581 | 40.8 | −10.4 |
| Liberal Democrats | S. Colclough | 312 | 8.1 | +4.7 |
| Green | F. Lilley | 74 | 1.9 | +1.9 |
| Majority | | 323 | 8.3 | |
| Conservative gain from Labour | | Swing | +10.2 | |

=== Hengrove ===
Hengrove
| Party | Candidate | Votes | % | ±% |
|---|---|---|---|---|
| Liberal Democrats | S. Loader | 1,753 | 43.1 | +9.5 |
| Conservative | S. Willis | 1,419 | 34.9 | −5.7 |
| Labour | R. Jones | 859 | 21.1 | −3.3 |
| Green | C. Presley | 37 | 0.9 | −0.5 |
| Majority | | 334 | 8.2 | |
| Liberal Democrats hold | | Swing | +7.6 | |

=== Henleaze ===
Henleaze
| Party | Candidate | Votes | % | ±% |
|---|---|---|---|---|
| Conservative | J. Fey | 2,701 | 66.4 | +1.7 |
| Liberal Democrats | H. Myers | 713 | 17.5 | −0.1 |
| Labour | B. Veal | 522 | 12.8 | −1.3 |
| Green | R. Morrish | 133 | 3.3 | −0.3 |
| Majority | | 1,988 | 48.9 | |
| Conservative hold | | Swing | +0.9 | |

=== Horfield ===
Horfield
| Party | Candidate | Votes | % | ±% |
|---|---|---|---|---|
| Conservative | B. Topham | 2,137 | 54.9 | +2.8 |
| Labour | R. Pyle | 1,321 | 34.0 | −4.6 |
| Liberal Democrats | J. Grace | 383 | 9.8 | +0.6 |
| Green | J. Duggan | 49 | 1.3 | +1.3 |
| Majority | | 816 | 21.0 | |
| Conservative hold | | Swing | +3.7 | |

=== Kingsweston ===
Kingsweston
| Party | Candidate | Votes | % | ±% |
|---|---|---|---|---|
| Labour | J. Bees | 1,649 | 46.9 | −5.4 |
| Conservative | J. Veale | 1,505 | 42.8 | +2.2 |
| Liberal Democrats | R. Parsons | 311 | 8.8 | +1.7 |
| Green | T. Coates | 53 | 1.5 | +1.5 |
| Majority | | 144 | 4.1 | |
| Labour hold | | Swing | -3.8 | |

=== Knowle ===
Knowle
| Party | Candidate | Votes | % | ±% |
|---|---|---|---|---|
| Labour | P. Roberts | 1,104 | 43.5 | −12.1 |
| Conservative | T. Skipp | 1,048 | 41.3 | +5.8 |
| Liberal Democrats | D. Gammon | 325 | 12.8 | +5.8 |
| Green | R. Martin | 60 | 2.4 | +0.5 |
| Majority | | 56 | 2.2 | |
| Labour hold | | Swing | -9.0 | |

=== Redland ===
Redland
| Party | Candidate | Votes | % | ±% |
|---|---|---|---|---|
| Conservative | M. Casewell | 1,815 | 41.4 | −5.5 |
| Labour | J. Ashton | 1,333 | 30.4 | +1.2 |
| Liberal Democrats | S. Williams | 1,111 | 25.4 | +7.8 |
| Green | D. Simpson | 121 | 2.8 | −3.5 |
| Majority | | 482 | 11.0 | |
| Conservative hold | | Swing | -3.4 | |

=== Southmead ===
Southmead
| Party | Candidate | Votes | % | ±% |
|---|---|---|---|---|
| Conservative | M. Kerry | 1,181 | 44.0 | +12.1 |
| Labour | A. Walder | 1,106 | 41.2 | −19.2 |
| Liberal Democrats | M. Natt | 348 | 13.0 | +5.4 |
| Green | P. Scott | 48 | 1.8 | +1.8 |
| Majority | | 75 | 2.8 | |
| Conservative gain from Labour | | Swing | +15.7 | |

=== St George East ===
St. George East
| Party | Candidate | Votes | % | ±% |
|---|---|---|---|---|
| Conservative | D. Fey | 1,276 | 43.3 | +5.4 |
| Labour | P. Hammond | 1,273 | 43.2 | −7.0 |
| Liberal Democrats | N. Drew | 343 | 11.6 | +4.3 |
| Green | E. MacLachlan | 55 | 1.9 | +0.2 |
| Majority | | 3 | 0.1 | |
| Conservative gain from Labour | | Swing | +6.2 | |

=== St George West ===
St. George West
| Party | Candidate | Votes | % | ±% |
|---|---|---|---|---|
| Labour | J. Preston | 1,640 | 50.5 | +5.9 |
| Liberal Democrats | P. Main | 854 | 26.3 | −13.8 |
| Conservative | M. Stump | 684 | 21.1 | +7.6 |
| Green | M. Rice | 69 | 2.1 | +0.4 |
| Majority | | 786 | 24.2 | |
| Labour hold | | Swing | +9.9 | |

=== Stockwood ===
Stockwood
| Party | Candidate | Votes | % | ±% |
|---|---|---|---|---|
| Conservative | C. Williams | 2,941 | 60.1 | +12.3 |
| Labour | P. Garland | 1,545 | 31.6 | −9.9 |
| Liberal Democrats | J. Collins | 357 | 7.3 | −0.7 |
| Green | S. Ball | 52 | 1.1 | −0.1 |
| Majority | | 1,396 | 28.5 | |
| Conservative hold | | Swing | +11.1 | |

=== Stoke Bishop ===
Stoke Bishop
| Party | Candidate | Votes | % | ±% |
|---|---|---|---|---|
| Conservative | M. Alderson | 2,783 | 71.0 | +3.5 |
| Liberal Democrats | E. Carpenter | 648 | 16.5 | +2.6 |
| Labour | S. Maidment | 389 | 9.9 | −5.2 |
| Green | J. Thorp | 98 | 2.5 | −1.0 |
| Majority | | 2,135 | 54.5 | |
| Conservative hold | | Swing | +0.5 | |

=== Westbury-on-Trym ===
Westbury-on-Trym
| Party | Candidate | Votes | % | ±% |
|---|---|---|---|---|
| Conservative | R. Wall | 3,378 | 72.2 | +3.3 |
| Liberal Democrats | D. Redway | 647 | 13.8 | +4.9 |
| Labour | J. Leighton | 546 | 11.7 | −1.7 |
| Green | N. Whittingham | 108 | 2.3 | −0.7 |
| Majority | | 2,731 | 58.4 | |
| Conservative hold | | Swing | -0.8 | |

=== Whitchurch Park ===
Whitchurch Park
| Party | Candidate | Votes | % | ±% |
|---|---|---|---|---|
| Labour | P. Smith | 1,499 | 62.0 | −10.2 |
| Conservative | J. Lopresti | 615 | 25.4 | +4.9 |
| Liberal Democrats | J. Charlton | 259 | 10.7 | +4.9 |
| Green | N. Duxfield | 44 | 1.8 | +0.3 |
| Majority | | 884 | 36.6 | |
| Labour hold | | Swing | -7.5 | |

=== Windmill Hill ===
Windmill Hill
| Party | Candidate | Votes | % | ±% |
|---|---|---|---|---|
| Labour | M. Ahmed | 1,401 | 45.3 | −21.4 |
| Conservative | W. Biggs | 956 | 30.9 | +7.8 |
| Liberal Democrats | C. Ackland | 407 | 13.1 | +6.0 |
| Green | J. Barraclough | 332 | 10.7 | +7.5 |
| Majority | | 445 | 14.4 | |
| Labour hold | | Swing | -14.6 | |

== Sources ==
- Bristol Evening Post 8 May 1992
