= 1991 Bristol City Council election =

1991 UK local government election

← 1990	2 May 1991	1992 →

23 of 68 seats (one third) to Bristol City Council 35 seats needed for a majority
	First party	Second party	Third party
Party	Labour	Conservative	Liberal Democrats
Seats won	45	18	5
Seat change	▲2	▼3	▲1
Council control before election
Labour Party (UK)
Council control after election
Labour Party (UK)

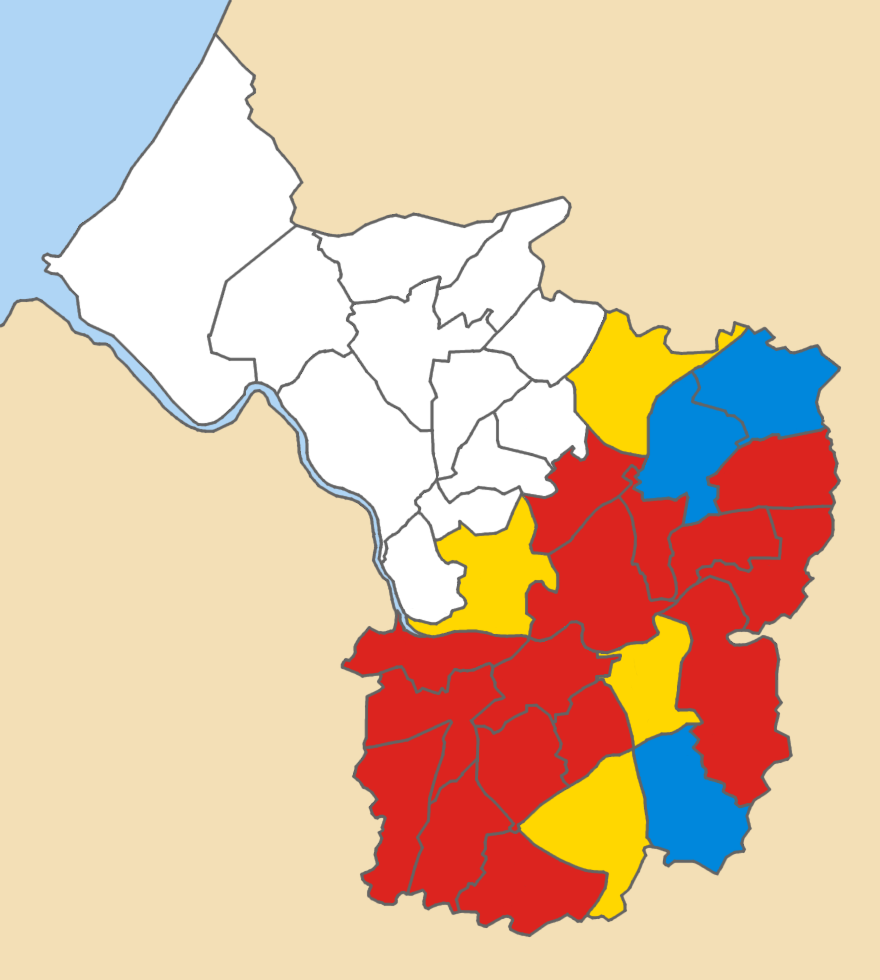
1991 local election results in Bristol

The 1991 Bristol City Council election took place on 2 May 1991 to elect members of Bristol City Council in England. This was on the same day as other local elections. One third of seats were up for election. Two seats were contested in Windmill Hill due to an extra vacancy occurring. There was a general swing against the Conservatives. In Lockleaze, the Labour Party failed to field a candidate because of a nomination papers error.

== Ward results ==
The change is calculated using the results when these actual seats were last contested, i.e. the 1987 election.

=== Ashley ===
Ashley
Party	Candidate	Votes	%	±%
Labour	H. Saad	1,581	47.9	−7.1
Green	D. Simpson	837	25.3	+17.3
Conservative	A. Calcutt	454	13.7	−3.5
Liberal Democrats	C. Bolton	431	13.0	−6.8
Majority		744	22.5	
Labour hold		Swing	-12.2	

=== Bedminster ===
Bedminster
Party	Candidate	Votes	%	±%
Labour	P. Crispin	2,031	45.3	+8.9
Conservative	I. Gillard	1,401	31.3	−6.1
Liberal Democrats	R. Hughes	900	20.1	−4.4
Green	N. Whittingham	149	3.3	+1.6
Majority		630	14.1	
Labour gain from Conservative		Swing	+7.5	

=== Bishopsworth ===
Bishopsworth
Party	Candidate	Votes	%	±%
Labour	D. Roberts	1,750	47.4	+5.8
Conservative	R. Eddy	1,345	36.4	−3.8
Liberal Democrats	V. Bartlett	444	12.0	−5.2
Green	B. Lewis	153	4.1	+3.2
Majority		405	11.0	
Labour hold		Swing	+4.8	

=== Brislington East ===
Brislington East
Party	Candidate	Votes	%	±%
Labour	P. Begley	2,002	45.4	+2.0
Conservative	A. Carey	1,531	34.7	+0.8
Liberal Democrats	R. Parsons	734	16.6	−3.4
Green	A. Clarke	144	3.3	+0.7
Majority		471	10.7	
Labour hold		Swing	+0.6	

=== Brislington West ===
Brislington West
Party	Candidate	Votes	%	±%
Liberal Democrats	B. Clarke	2,526	54.8	+6.8
Labour	J. Bees	1,057	22.9	+1.6
Conservative	J. Cressey	902	19.6	−9.7
Green	F. Loughran	128	2.8	+1.5
Majority		1,469	31.8	
Liberal Democrats hold		Swing	+2.6	

=== Cabot ===
Cabot
Party	Candidate	Votes	%	±%
Liberal Democrats	S. Brownlow	1,568	41.0	+0.3
Labour	C. Hackett	1,112	29.0	+4.3
Conservative	P. Cobbold	834	21.8	−7.6
Green	J. Quinnell	315	8.2	+3.6
Majority		456	11.9	
Liberal Democrats hold		Swing	-2.0	

=== Easton ===
Easton
Party	Candidate	Votes	%	±%
Labour	K. Yarwood	1,645	46.8	+0.9
Liberal Democrats	M. Smith	1,204	34.3	−5.6
Conservative	P. Warford	424	12.1	−0.7
Green	P. Taylor	240	6.8	+5.4
Majority		441	12.6	
Labour hold		Swing	+3.3	

=== Eastville ===
Eastville
Party	Candidate	Votes	%	±%
Conservative	J. Vowles	1,602	40.3	−6.0
Labour	J. Williams	1,415	35.6	+2.4
Liberal Democrats	G. Williams	764	19.2	+1.3
Green	S. Jeffery	190	4.8	+2.2
Majority		187	4.7	
Conservative hold		Swing	-4.2	

=== Filwood ===
Filwood
Party	Candidate	Votes	%	±%
Labour	G. Micklewright	1,719	71.2	+1.2
Liberal Democrats	L. Cooper	309	12.8	+0.5
Conservative	J. Lopresti	286	11.8	−4.7
Green	C. Presley	101	4.2	+3.1
Majority		1,410	58.4	
Labour hold		Swing	+0.4	

=== Frome Vale ===
Frome Vale
Party	Candidate	Votes	%	±%
Conservative	K. Blanchard	2,278	44.1	+0.8
Labour	M. McGrath	2,175	42.2	+5.1
Liberal Democrats	R. Windmill	542	10.5	−9.1
Green	B. Searle	165	3.2	+3.2
Majority		103	2.0	
Conservative hold		Swing	-2.2	

=== Hartcliffe ===
Hartcliffe
Party	Candidate	Votes	%	±%
Labour	F. Pidgeon	1,675	49.3	+1.5
Conservative	S. Willis	1,062	31.2	+0.4
Liberal Democrats	R. Beaty	538	15.8	−3.5
Green	H. Armstrong	124	3.6	+1.6
Majority		613	18.0	
Labour hold		Swing	+0.6	

=== Hengrove ===
Hengrove
Party	Candidate	Votes	%	±%
Liberal Democrats	J. Webb	3,050	56.1	+21.3
Conservative	B. Edwards	1,251	23.0	−16.6
Labour	R. Jones	1,063	19.5	−6.1
Green	L. Hersey	74	1.4	+1.4
Majority		1,799	33.1	
Liberal Democrats gain from Conservative		Swing	+19.0	

=== Hillfields ===
Hillfields
Party	Candidate	Votes	%	±%
Labour	G. Robertson	1,792	48.8	+2.9
Conservative	A. Seville	1,024	27.9	−7.0
Liberal Democrats	G. Draper	727	19.8	+0.6
Green	S. Popperwell	126	3.4	+3.4
Majority		768	20.9	
Labour hold		Swing	+5.0	

=== Knowle ===
Knowle
Party	Candidate	Votes	%	±%
Labour	S. Lamprey	1,870	52.3	+4.6
Conservative	L. De'Ath	1,005	28.1	−7.8
Liberal Democrats	P. Lambourne	584	16.3	+1.5
Green	S. Ball	117	3.3	+1.7
Majority		865	24.2	
Labour hold		Swing	+6.2	

=== Lawrence Hill ===
Lawrence Hill
Party	Candidate	Votes	%	±%
Labour	J. Jones	2,086	66.2	+3.9
Conservative	H. Richmond	496	15.7	−2.9
Liberal Democrats	K. O'Hara	411	13.0	−3.6
Green	H. Irvine	159	5.0	+5.0
Majority		1,590	50.4	
Labour hold		Swing	+3.4	

=== Lockleaze ===
Lockleaze
Party	Candidate	Votes	%	±%
Liberal Democrats	I. Parry	1,763	59.8	+47.4
Conservative	M. Davis	865	29.3	−3.5
Green	R. Morrish	321	10.9	+9.9
Majority		898	30.5	
Liberal Democrats gain from Labour		Swing	+25.5	

=== Southville ===
Southville
Party	Candidate	Votes	%	±%
Labour	A. May	2,110	52.8	+2.7
Conservative	C. Stephenson	1,064	26.6	−4.9
Liberal Democrats	P. Hall	543	13.6	−1.0
Green	R. Martin	280	7.0	+3.2
Majority		1,046	26.2	
Labour hold		Swing	+3.8	

=== St George East ===
St. George East
Party	Candidate	Votes	%	±%
Labour	C. Price	1,727	43.7	+8.7
Conservative	D. Fey	1,381	34.9	−7.4
Liberal Democrats	S. Pritchard	709	17.9	−3.0
Green	M. Brambley	137	3.5	+1.7
Majority		346	8.8	
Labour gain from Conservative		Swing	+8.1	

=== St George West ===
St. George West
Party	Candidate	Votes	%	±%
Labour	J. Deasy	1,913	47.6	+15.1
Liberal Democrats	P. Main	1,464	36.4	−14.7
Conservative	M. Stump	556	13.8	−2.6
Green	M. Hooper	85	2.1	+2.1
Majority		449	11.2	
Labour gain from Liberal Democrats		Swing	+14.9	

=== Stockwood ===
Stockwood
Party	Candidate	Votes	%	±%
Conservative	M. Stamper	2,307	43.1	−7.3
Labour	P. Garland	2,108	39.4	+10.0
Liberal Democrats	J. Collins	803	15.0	−4.3
Green	G. Collard	131	2.4	+1.5
Majority		199	3.7	
Conservative hold		Swing	-8.7	

=== Whitchurch Park ===
Whitchurch Park
Party	Candidate	Votes	%	±%
Labour	H. Holland	2,027	59.2	+5.4
Conservative	C. Trotman	725	21.2	−6.2
Liberal Democrats	R. Winch	567	16.6	−0.9
Green	B. Hussain	106	3.1	+1.8
Majority		1,302	38.0	
Labour hold		Swing	+5.8	

=== Windmill Hill ===
Windmill Hill - 2 seats
Party	Candidate	Votes	%	±%
Labour	D. Bunyan	2,008	45.1	−6.3
Labour	M. Ahmed	1,848		
Conservative	W. Biggs	1,007	22.6	−6.7
Liberal Democrats	R. Kirkham	908	20.4	+4.8
Green	C. Bolton	529	11.9	+8.1
Green	M. Turnbull	463		
Majority		841	18.9	
Labour hold		Swing	+0.2	

== Sources ==
- Bristol Evening Post 4 May 1991
