= 1988 Bristol City Council election =

1988 UK local government election

← 1987	5 May 1988	1990 →

23 of 68 seats (one third) to Bristol City Council 35 seats needed for a majority
	First party	Second party	Third party
Party	Labour	Conservative	Liberal Democrats
Seats won	39	24	5
Seat change	▲2	▼1	▼1
Council control before election
Labour Party (UK)
Council control after election
Labour Party (UK)

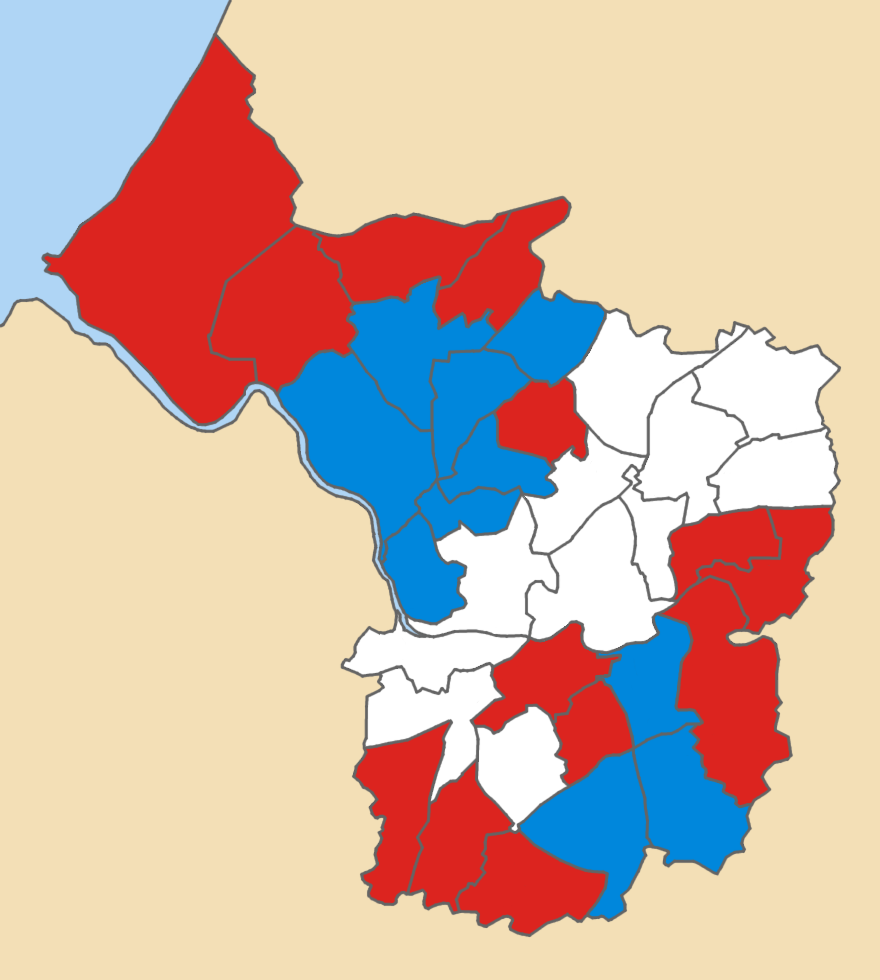
1988 local election results in Bristol

The 1988 Bristol City Council election took place on 5 May 1988 to elect members of Bristol City Council in England. This was on the same day as other local elections. One third of seats were up for election. This was the first election following the merger of the Liberal Party and SDP to form the Social & Liberal Democrats. There were also several candidates representing the continuing SDP. There was a general small swing to Labour.

== Ward results ==
The change is calculated using the results when these actual seats were last contested, i.e. the 1984 election.

=== Avonmouth ===
Avonmouth
Party	Candidate	Votes	%	±%
Labour	V.M. Horrigan	2,349	50.3	−7.4
Conservative	D.P. Pullin	2,054	44.0	+11.6
Liberal Democrats	E. Jacobs	212	4.5	−4.5
Green	L.G. Jeffries	57	1.2	+0.2
Majority		295	6.3	
Labour hold		Swing	-9.5	

- The Conservatives won Avonmouth in a by-election in 1987 and lost the seat back to Labour at this election.

=== Bishopston ===
Bishopston
Party	Candidate	Votes	%	±%
Labour	P.M. McLaren	2,027	38.0	+1.6
Conservative	M.C. Withers	1,844	34.6	−3.0
Liberal Democrats	S.V. Spilsbury	1,318	24.7	+0.8
Green	D.W. Bowring	145	2.7	+0.6
Majority		183	3.4	
Labour gain from Conservative		Swing	+2.3	

=== Bishopsworth ===
Bishopsworth
Party	Candidate	Votes	%	±%
Labour	J.B. McLaren	1,808	48.9	+0.4
Conservative	R.S. Eddy	1,504	40.7	−1.3
SDP	S.M. Willis	249	6.7	+6.7
Liberal Democrats	G.K. Hughes	136	3.7	−4.8
Majority		304	8.2	
Labour hold		Swing	+0.9	

=== Brislington East ===
Brislington East
Party	Candidate	Votes	%	±%
Labour	D.J. Herod	2,561	50.7	−4.4
Conservative	I.E. Temple	1,950	38.6	+6.9
Liberal Democrats	J. Exon	446	8.8	−3.7
Green	G.H. Davey	95	1.9	+1.2
Majority		611	12.1	
Labour hold		Swing	-5.7	

=== Brislington West ===
Brislington West
Party	Candidate	Votes	%	±%
Conservative	P. Dodd	1,565	34.8	−1.3
Liberal Democrats	A.G. D'Eyncourt-Harvey	1,536	34.2	−0.1
Labour	R.C. Hall	1,264	28.1	−0.4
Green	M.B. Wood	126	2.8	+1.8
Majority		29	0.6	
Conservative hold		Swing	-0.6	

=== Clifton ===
Clifton
Party	Candidate	Votes	%	±%
Conservative	A.D. Tasker	1,900	47.5	+2.5
Liberal Democrats	E.R. Beaty	925	23.1	−14.8
Labour	G. Buchanan	813	20.3	+6.6
Green	G.A. Dorey	215	5.4	+2.0
SDP	W. Long	150	3.7	+3.7
Majority		975	24.4	
Conservative hold		Swing	+8.7	

=== Cotham ===
Cotham
Party	Candidate	Votes	%	±%
Conservative	P.J. Sidebottom	1,564	44.7	+0.8
Labour	L.M. McCabe	1,048	29.9	+12.9
Liberal Democrats	M.R. Laker	512	14.6	−20.8
Green	G. Collard	243	6.9	+3.2
SDP	P.W. Lloyd	134	3.8	+3.8
Majority		516	14.7	
Conservative hold		Swing	-6.1	

=== Hartcliffe ===
Hartcliffe
Party	Candidate	Votes	%	±%
Labour	B.B. Richards	2,021	62.7	+8.2
Conservative	B.R. Edwards	911	28.3	−0.5
Liberal Democrats	I.H. Reed	230	7.1	−8.1
Green	D.A. Tayler	59	1.8	+0.3
Majority		1,110	34.5	
Labour hold		Swing	+4.4	

=== Henbury ===
Henbury
Party	Candidate	Votes	%	±%
Labour	J. Patterson	2,579	51.2	+7.8
Conservative	L.J. Roberts	1,973	39.2	−3.9
SDP	W.S. Gibbens	315	6.3	+6.3
Liberal Democrats	E.A. Boney	170	3.4	−9.3
Majority		606	12.0	
Labour hold		Swing	+5.9	

=== Hengrove ===
Hengrove
Party	Candidate	Votes	%	±%
Conservative	D.R. Parsons	2,065	40.6	−13.0
Liberal Democrats	J.M. Webb	1,706	33.6	+33.6
Labour	M.P. McGrath	1,239	24.4	−18.7
Green	M.P.N. Turnbull	70	1.4	−1.9
Majority		359	7.1	
Conservative hold		Swing	-23.3	

=== Henleaze ===
Henleaze
Party	Candidate	Votes	%	±%
Conservative	J.M. Fey	2,893	64.7	−11.5
Liberal Democrats	J. Carpenter	785	17.6	+17.6
Labour	A.J. Danford	629	14.1	−2.3
Green	R.A. Glaves	163	3.6	−3.8
Majority		2,108	47.2	
Conservative hold		Swing	-14.6	

=== Horfield ===
Horfield
Party	Candidate	Votes	%	±%
Conservative	F.J. Apperley	2,136	52.1	+11.6
Labour	R.P. Clease	1,583	38.6	+16.9
Liberal Democrats	S.E. Young	377	9.2	−28.0
Majority		553	13.5	
Conservative hold		Swing	-2.7	

=== Kingsweston ===
Kingsweston
Party	Candidate	Votes	%	±%
Labour	A.E.C. Tudball	2,346	52.3	+7.0
Conservative	M.J. Farrington	1,820	40.6	−3.8
Liberal Democrats	F.R. Young	320	7.1	−1.9
Majority		526	11.7	
Labour hold		Swing	+5.4	

=== Knowle ===
Knowle
Party	Candidate	Votes	%	±%
Labour	P. Roberts	2,089	55.6	−2.6
Conservative	T.J. Skipp	1,331	35.5	+2.9
Liberal Democrats	D.M. Usher	261	7.0	−0.5
Green	M.A. Pitt	73	1.9	+0.2
Majority		758	20.2	
Labour hold		Swing	-2.8	

=== Redland ===
Redland
Party	Candidate	Votes	%	±%
Conservative	R.S. Trench	1,849	46.9	−6.3
Labour	A.M. Wallder	1,153	29.2	+9.4
Liberal Democrats	S.C. Emmett	692	17.6	−4.0
Green	C.R. Leegwater	248	6.3	+0.8
Majority		696	17.7	
Conservative hold		Swing	-7.9	

=== St George East ===
St. George East
Party	Candidate	Votes	%	±%
Labour	P.W. Hammond	1,858	50.2	+3.1
Conservative	P.C. Hole	1,403	37.9	−4.3
Liberal Democrats	G.H. Draper	272	7.3	−0.7
SDP	J.R.S. Osborne	106	2.9	+2.9
Green	C.A. Stones	64	1.7	−1.1
Majority		455	12.3	
Labour hold		Swing	+3.7	

=== St George West ===
St. George West
Party	Candidate	Votes	%	±%
Labour	C. O'Sullivan	1,690	44.6	+10.9
Liberal Democrats	B.J. Pinkerton	1,521	40.1	−4.8
Conservative	D.A. Wiltshire	513	13.5	−7.5
Green	C. Adams	66	1.7	+1.3
Majority		169	4.5	
Labour gain from Liberal Democrats		Swing	+7.9	

=== Southmead ===
Southmead
Party	Candidate	Votes	%	±%
Labour	L. Broomhead	2,288	60.4	+3.6
Conservative	A.M.B. Orr	1,209	31.9	−0.2
Liberal Democrats	B.A. Knott	288	7.6	−2.3
Majority		1,079	28.5	
Labour hold		Swing	+1.9	

=== Stockwood ===
Stockwood
Party	Candidate	Votes	%	±%
Conservative	C.J.N. Williams	2,635	47.8	+2.7
Labour	D.J. Redgewell	2,290	41.5	+1.2
Liberal Democrats	R.C. Bingham	439	8.0	−5.9
SDP	R.A. Dickson	85	1.5	+1.5
Green	L.D. Golden	66	1.2	+0.5
Majority		345	6.3	
Conservative hold		Swing	+0.8	

=== Stoke Bishop ===
Stoke Bishop
Party	Candidate	Votes	%	±%
Conservative	C.D.M.B. Alderson	2,964	67.5	+3.0
Labour	D.A.W. Branch	661	15.1	+3.8
Liberal Democrats	D.K. Jones	609	13.9	−6.3
Green	L. Hersey	155	3.5	−0.6
Majority		2,303	52.5	
Conservative hold		Swing	-0.4	

=== Westbury-on-Trym ===
Westbury-on-Trym
Party	Candidate	Votes	%	±%
Conservative	R.W. Wall	3,282	68.9	−3.9
Labour	T.C. Collins	639	13.4	+4.0
Liberal Democrats	A.D. West	424	8.9	−6.5
SDP	H.S. Long	275	5.8	+5.8
Green	D.C. Watson	145	3.0	+0.5
Majority		2,643	55.5	
Conservative hold		Swing	-4.0	

=== Whitchurch Park ===
Whitchurch Park
Party	Candidate	Votes	%	±%
Labour	P.H. Smith	2,510	72.2	+8.9
Conservative	T.J. Part	713	20.5	−6.4
Liberal Democrats	R.C. Steadman	202	5.8	−2.5
Green	B.B. Hussain	51	1.5	0.0
Majority		1,797	51.7	
Labour hold		Swing	+7.7	

=== Windmill Hill ===
Windmill Hill
Party	Candidate	Votes	%	±%
Labour	P.R. Tatlow	2,823	66.7	+12.0
Conservative	S. Woodward	978	23.1	−9.2
Liberal Democrats	D.J.A. Boyle	300	7.1	−3.4
Green	S.J. Campbell	134	3.2	+0.7
Majority		1,845	43.6	
Labour hold		Swing	+10.6	

== Sources ==
- Bristol Evening Post 6 May 1988
