= 1990 Bristol City Council election =

1990 UK local government election

← 1988	3 May 1990	1991 →

25 of 68 seats (one third) to Bristol City Council 35 seats needed for a majority
	First party	Second party	Third party
Party	Labour	Conservative	Liberal Democrats
Seats won	43	21	4
Seat change	▲4	▼3	▼1
Council control before election
Labour Party (UK)
Council control after election
Labour Party (UK)

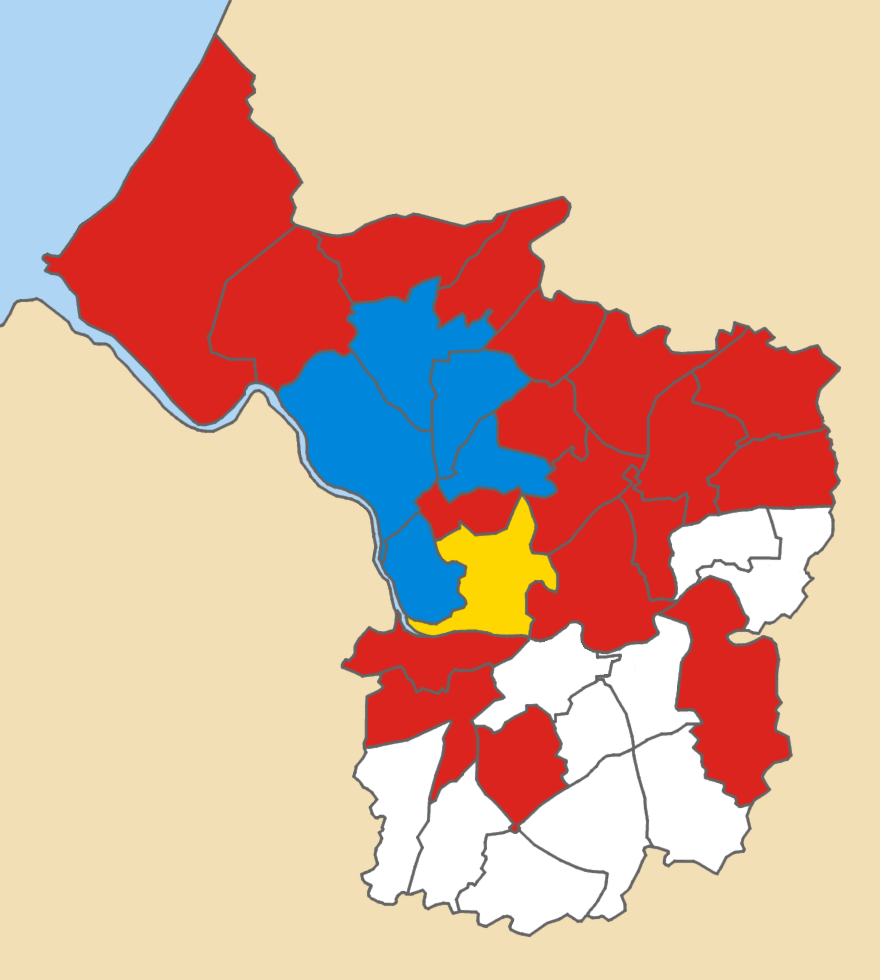
1990 local election results in Bristol

The 1990 Bristol City Council election took place on 3 May 1990 to elect members of Bristol City Council in England. This was on the same day as other local elections. One third of seats were up for election. There were by-elections in Brislington East and Easton. As Easton also had an election in the usual schedule, 2 seats were elected in that ward. There was a significant swing against the Liberal Democrats, largely as a result of the post-merger chaos that the party suffered.

== Ward results ==
The change is calculated using the results when these actual seats were last contested, i.e. the 1986 election.

=== Ashley ===
Ashley
Party	Candidate	Votes	%	±%
Labour	D. Sutton	1,946	56.1	−4.3
Green	D. Simpson	899	25.9	+20.0
Conservative	R. Hodges	388	11.2	−5.0
Liberal Democrats	I. Dunn	235	6.8	−7.8
Majority		1,047	30.2	
Labour hold		Swing	-12.2	

=== Avonmouth ===
Avonmouth
Party	Candidate	Votes	%	±%
Labour	C. Lukins	2,870	67.8	+13.1
Conservative	G. Tyrrell	990	23.4	−6.5
Green	L. Hersey	372	8.8	+7.3
Majority		1,880	44.4	
Labour hold		Swing	+9.8	

=== Bedminster ===
Bedminster
Party	Candidate	Votes	%	±%
Labour	C. Warren	2,660	57.4	+15.3
Conservative	B. Edwards	1,065	23.0	−5.4
Liberal Democrats	R. Hughes	614	13.2	−14.9
Green	A. Gogarty	295	6.4	+5.0
Majority		1,595	34.4	
Labour hold		Swing	+10.4	

=== Bishopston ===
Bishopston
Party	Candidate	Votes	%	±%
Labour	H. Bashforth	2,270	45.0	+12.2
Conservative	W. Brown	1,146	22.7	−9.4
Liberal Democrats	D. Boyle	1,093	21.7	−10.3
Green	J. Quinnell	536	10.6	+7.4
Majority		1,124	22.3	
Labour hold		Swing	+10.8	

=== Brislington East ===
Brislington East by-election
Party	Candidate	Votes	%	±%
Labour	P. Begley	2,686	55.6	+12.2
Conservative	A. Carey	1,217	25.2	−8.7
Liberal Democrats	R. Parsons	399	8.3	−11.7
Green	G. Davey	274	5.7	+3.1
SDP	D. Brockwell	255	5.3	+5.3
Majority		1,469	30.4	
Labour hold		Swing	+10.5	

=== Cabot ===
Cabot
Party	Candidate	Votes	%	±%
Liberal Democrats	C. Boney	1,297	34.2	−8.8
Labour	C. Hackett	1,272	33.5	+6.6
Conservative	P. Cobbold	797	21.0	−3.8
Green	A. Clarke	429	11.3	+6.0
Majority		25	0.7	
Liberal Democrats hold		Swing	-7.7	

=== Clifton ===
Clifton
Party	Candidate	Votes	%	±%
Conservative	D. Rollings	1,678	37.0	−0.5
Green	G. Sawday	1,148	25.3	+20.7
Labour	N. Steven	1,039	22.9	+2.4
Liberal Democrats	S. Petters	670	14.8	−22.5
Majority		530	11.7	
Conservative hold		Swing	-10.6	

=== Cotham ===
Cotham
Party	Candidate	Votes	%	±%
Labour	C. Taylor	1,483	36.8	+14.6
Conservative	G. Hebblethwaite	1,366	33.9	−4.5
Green	G. Collard	654	16.2	+11.1
Liberal Democrats	P. Young	531	13.2	−21.2
Majority		117	2.9	
Labour gain from Conservative		Swing	+9.6	

=== Easton ===
Easton - 2 seats
Party	Candidate	Votes	%	±%
Labour	R. Moss	2,085	51.5	+10.5
Labour	J. Yarwood	2,020		
Liberal Democrats	J. Freeman	1,288	31.8	−16.6
Liberal Democrats	M. Smith	1,268		
Conservative	S. Hennighan	341	8.4	−0.8
Green	S. Jeffery	334	8.3	+6.9
Conservative	S. Rizvi	280		
Green	R. Nicholls	268		
Majority		732	18.1	
Labour hold		Swing	+13.6	
Labour gain from Liberal Democrats		Swing	+13.6	

=== Eastville ===
Eastville
Party	Candidate	Votes	%	±%
Labour	C. Stokes	1,959	47.4	+9.8
Conservative	D. Fey	1,391	33.7	−7.4
Liberal Democrats	G. Williams	469	11.4	−6.1
Green	C. Leroy	311	7.5	+3.7
Majority		568	13.8	
Labour gain from Conservative		Swing	+8.6	

=== Filwood ===
Filwood
Party	Candidate	Votes	%	±%
Labour	D. Bryan	1,817	64.2	−9.8
Anti Poll Tax	J. Uppington	710	25.1	+25.1
Green	G. Vowles	303	10.7	+8.8
Majority		1,107	39.1	
Labour hold		Swing	-17.5	

=== Frome Vale ===
Frome Vale
Party	Candidate	Votes	%	±%
Labour	M. Langley	2,656	52.2	+6.5
Conservative	J. Errington	1,586	31.0	−5.9
Liberal Democrats	R. Windmill	477	9.3	−6.4
Green	S. MacSorley	392	7.7	+6.1
Majority		1,070	20.9	
Labour hold		Swing	+6.2	

=== Henbury ===
Henbury
Party	Candidate	Votes	%	±%
Labour	J. Fisk	2,591	56.4	+8.9
Conservative	G. Gollop	1,200	26.1	−9.5
Liberal Democrats	A. Stephen	492	10.7	−4.4
SDP	H. Long	139	3.0	+3.0
Green	J. Thorp	136	3.0	+1.2
Brentry Residents	S. Wiles	34	0.7	+0.7
Majority		1,391	30.3	
Labour hold		Swing	+9.2	

=== Henleaze ===
Henleaze
Party	Candidate	Votes	%	±%
Conservative	G. Browne	2,440	51.6	−5.3
Labour	M. Vokins	904	19.1	+5.6
Liberal Democrats	L. Smith	893	18.9	−6.1
Green	M. Coldham	495	10.5	+5.9
Majority		1,536	32.5	
Conservative hold		Swing	-5.5	

=== Hillfields ===
Hillfields
Party	Candidate	Votes	%	±%
Labour	D. Naysmith	2,393	59.8	+2.0
Conservative	A. Seville	743	18.6	−5.8
Liberal Democrats	G. Draper	469	11.7	−4.0
Green	C. Stones	216	5.4	+3.3
SDP	P. Hopkins	181	4.5	+4.5
Majority		1,650	41.2	
Labour hold		Swing	+3.9	

=== Horfield ===
Horfield
Party	Candidate	Votes	%	±%
Labour	J. Channon	1,971	43.3	+12.2
Conservative	B. Topham	1,821	40.0	−9.0
Liberal Democrats	S. Young	530	11.6	−6.0
Green	J. Duggan	232	5.1	+2.8
Majority		150	3.3	
Labour gain from Conservative		Swing	+10.6	

=== Kingsweston ===
Kingsweston
Party	Candidate	Votes	%	±%
Labour	R. Clarke	2,477	59.3	+14.9
Conservative	J. Veale	1,017	24.3	−17.7
Liberal Democrats	M. Hamilton	510	12.2	−0.2
Green	P. Roe	176	4.2	+3.0
Majority		1,460	34.9	
Labour hold		Swing	+16.3	

=== Lawrence Hill ===
Lawrence Hill
Party	Candidate	Votes	%	±%
Labour	D. Tedder	2,548	71.5	−0.1
Conservative	H. Crispin	438	12.3	−3.4
Liberal Democrats	S. Carrick	315	8.8	−2.3
Green	D. Wall	265	7.4	+5.8
Majority		2,110	59.2	
Labour hold		Swing	+1.7	

=== Lockleaze ===
Lockleaze
Party	Candidate	Votes	%	±%
Labour	F. Barnes	2,434	66.3	+11.2
Conservative	M. Davis	607	16.5	−11.3
Liberal Democrats	F. Young	426	11.6	−3.8
Green	E. Bullard	202	5.5	+3.7
Majority		1,827	49.8	
Labour hold		Swing	+11.3	

=== Redland ===
Redland
Party	Candidate	Votes	%	±%
Conservative	I. Temple	1,670	36.8	−5.5
Labour	J. Ashton	1,658	36.6	+13.2
Liberal Democrats	J. Fenn	647	14.3	−14.8
Green	C. Leegwater	558	12.3	+7.0
Majority		12	0.2	
Conservative hold		Swing	-9.4	

=== Southmead ===
Southmead
Party	Candidate	Votes	%	±%
Labour	L. Bromham	2,428	61.5	+7.0
Conservative	A. Orr	846	21.4	−5.2
Liberal Democrats	J. Taylor	356	9.0	−8.4
Green	P. Scott	167	4.2	+2.8
SDP	W. Gibbens	150	3.8	+3.8
Majority		1,582	40.1	
Labour hold		Swing	+6.1	

=== Southville ===
Southville
Party	Candidate	Votes	%	±%
Labour	N. Currie	2,416	57.8	+1.3
Conservative	J. Pepworth	879	21.0	−5.6
Green	R. Martin	450	10.8	+7.2
Liberal Democrats	V. Bartlett	434	10.4	−2.9
Majority		1,537	36.8	
Labour hold		Swing	+3.5	

=== Stoke Bishop ===
Stoke Bishop
Party	Candidate	Votes	%	±%
Conservative	P. Abraham	2,741	52.7	−1.6
Liberal Democrats	R. Pyne	1,010	19.4	−12.3
Labour	M. Fleming	977	18.8	+7.2
Green	E. MacLachlan	471	9.1	+6.6
Majority		1,731	33.3	
Conservative hold		Swing	+5.4	

=== Westbury-on-Trym ===
Westbury-on-Trym
Party	Candidate	Votes	%	±%
Conservative	D. Poole	2,915	58.6	−8.3
Labour	M. Hulin	854	17.2	+6.0
Liberal Democrats	D. Redway	725	14.6	−4.9
Green	D. Watson	347	7.0	+4.6
SDP	A. Smith	136	2.7	+2.7
Majority		2,061	41.4	
Conservative hold		Swing	-7.2	

== Sources ==
- Bristol Evening Post 4 May 1990
