= 1995 Bristol City Council election =

1995 UK local government election

← 1994	4 May 1995	1997 →

All 68 seats to Bristol City Council 35 seats needed for a majority
	First party	Second party	Third party
Party	Labour	Liberal Democrats	Conservative
Seats won	53	9	6
Seat change	Steady	Steady	Steady
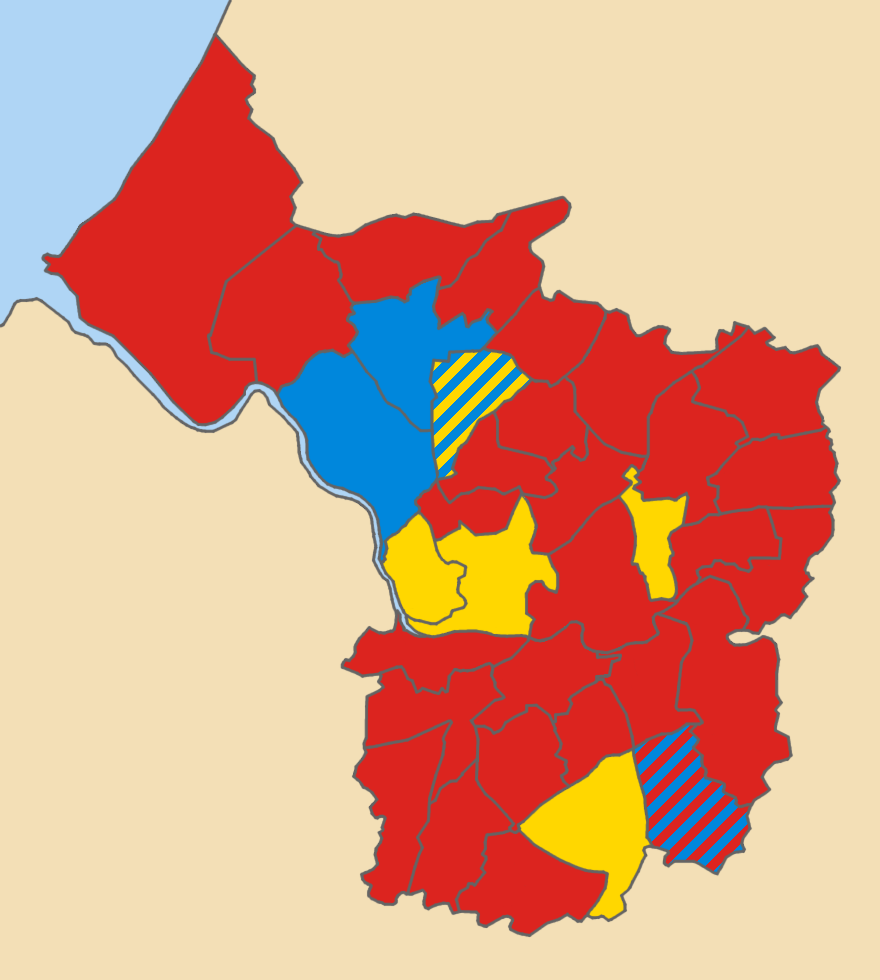
- 1995 local election results in Bristol
Council control before election
Labour
Council control after election
Labour

The 1995 Bristol City Council election took place on 4 May 1995 with all seats being up for election, in preparation for Bristol City Council becoming a Unitary Authority following the abolition of Avon County Council. The same ward boundaries were used, however these are elections to a new authority and cannot be considered gains or losses compared to previously held seats.

The election saw national issues, such as the unpopularity of the national Conservative government and the state of the economy, being the major issues in the election. The Conservative candidates branded themselves as 'Bristol Conservatives', which was seen as an attempt to distance themselves from the national government. The Labour Party was expected to win a large majority but they were criticised by the Conservatives for cutting money from the Scouts while giving money to a lesbian/bisexual women's group.

Labour easily gained a majority and as predicted before the election the Liberal Democrats became the second largest party on the council driving the Conservatives down to third as compared to the previous district council.

== Election results ==
The vote and seat share for all parties that contested the election:

Party	Cllrs	% Vote	±%
Labour Party	53	53.3	N/A
Liberal Democrats	9	19.6	N/A
Conservative Party	6	24.8	N/A
Green Party	0	2.3	N/A
Total	68	100.00	

== Ward results ==
These election results are to the new Unitary Authority of Bristol City Council, therefore they cannot be considered gains or losses compared to previously held seats.

=== Ashley ===
Ashley
Party	Candidate	Votes	%	±%
Labour	Nichola I. Barton	1,763	70.41	
Labour	Raymond J. Sefia	1,472	58.79	
Green	David M. Simpson	426	17.01	
Liberal Democrats	John H. Bonham-Carter	393	15.69	
Liberal Democrats	Jane McGarry	368	14.70	
Conservative	Kerrie Carpenter	223	8.91	
Conservative	Ian J. Henderson	214	8.55	
Majority		1,046	41.77	
Turnout		2,504	31.83	N/A
Registered electors		7,867		N/A

=== Avonmouth ===
Avonmouth
Party	Candidate	Votes	%	±%
Labour	Celia M. Lukins	2,200	70.42	
Labour	Ernie Bristow	2,149	68.79	
Conservative	David L. Holme	578	18.50	
Liberal Democrats	Paul W. Lloyd	419	13.41	
Liberal Democrats	Pamela Henderson	371	11.88	
Majority		1,571	50.29	
Turnout		3,124	41.83	N/A
Registered electors		7,468		N/A

=== Bedminster ===
Bedminster
Party	Candidate	Votes	%	±%
Labour	Peter J. Crispin	2,001	67.92	
Labour	Claire M. Warren	1,683	57.13	
Conservative	Jack Lopresti	526	17.85	
Liberal Democrats	Mary Sykes	513	17.41	
Conservative	Christian V.J. Simpson	498	16.90	
Green	Charles N. Bolton	281	9.54	
Majority		1,157	39.27	
Turnout		2,946	34.93	N/A
Registered electors		8,433		N/A

=== Bishopston ===
Bishopston
Party	Candidate	Votes	%	±%
Labour	Patricia M. McLaren	2,115	52.80	
Labour	Arthur Keefe	2,064	51.52	
Liberal Democrats	David J.G. Kitson	1,055	26.34	
Liberal Democrats	Peter J. Maitland	966	24.11	
Conservative	Ian E. Kealey	718	17.92	
Conservative	Pearl C.L. Abraham	695	17.35	
Green	Justin M. Quinnell	298	7.44	
Majority		1,009	25.19	
Turnout		4,006	44.98	N/A
Registered electors		8,906		N/A

=== Bishopsworth ===
Bishopsworth
Party	Candidate	Votes	%	±%
Labour	Terence Cleverley	1,674	57.35	
Labour	Paul C. Walker	1,468	50.29	
Conservative	Richard S. Eddy	1,138	38.99	
Conservative	Michael J. Jarrett	1,022	35.01	
Liberal Democrats	Nicholas L. Doddrell	218	7.47	
Green	Barrie R. Lewis	124	4.25	
Majority		330	11.31	
Turnout		2,919	40.87	N/A
Registered electors		7,142		N/A

=== Brislington East ===
Brislington East
Party	Candidate	Votes	%	±%
Labour	William L. Martin	2,357	64.03	
Labour	Peter T.J. Begley	2,297	62.40	
Conservative	Anthony R. Carey	823	22.36	
Conservative	Colin R. Bretherton	761	20.67	
Liberal Democrats	Jeffery Exon	495	13.45	
Liberal Democrats	Linda Hopkins	404	10.98	
Majority		1,474	40.04	
Turnout		3,681	39.92	N/A
Registered electors		9,220		N/A

=== Brislington West ===
Brislington West
Party	Candidate	Votes	%	±%
Labour	Dan Norris	1,905	49.92	
Labour	Jane V. Painter	1,859	48.72	
Liberal Democrats	Peter H. Main	1,217	31.89	
Liberal Democrats	Catherine F. Johnstone	1,188	31.13	
Conservative	Holly Richmond	656	17.19	
Conservative	Ian D. Millard	609	15.96	
Green	Mary B. Wood	169	4.43	
Majority		642	16.82	
Turnout		3,816	45.54	N/A
Registered electors		8,379		N/A

=== Cabot ===
Cabot
Party	Candidate	Votes	%	±%
Liberal Democrats	Charles R. Boney	1,395	44.50	
Liberal Democrats	Stephen R. Williams	1,264	40.32	
Labour	Paul A. Garland	1,182	37.70	
Labour	William J. Waines	997	31.80	
Conservative	Ashley P. Fox	518	16.52	
Conservative	David J. Smith	499	15.92	
Green	Rowan V. Beton	277	8.84	
Majority		82	2.62	
Turnout		3,135	34.80	N/A
Registered electors		9,008		N/A

=== Clifton ===
Clifton
Party	Candidate	Votes	%	±%
Liberal Democrats	Barbara Janke	1,574	41.77	
Liberal Democrats	Brian H. Price	1,554	41.24	
Conservative	John Bretten	1,241	32.94	
Conservative	Alan D. Tasker	1,192	31.63	
Labour	Nicole A.M. Steven	808	21.44	
Labour	Denton W. Brockway	807	21.42	
Green	Lucinda Hersey	259	6.87	
Majority		313	8.31	
Turnout		3,768	39.58	N/A
Registered electors		9,519		N/A

=== Cotham ===
Cotham
Party	Candidate	Votes	%	±%
Labour	Shelley M. Lanchbury	1,609	47.20	
Labour	Fabian G. Breckels	1,584	46.47	
Conservative	Philip A. Cobbold	899	26.37	
Conservative	Anthony M.B. Orr	884	25.93	
Liberal Democrats	Michael C. Bosel	727	21.33	
Liberal Democrats	Gizella K. Hughes	717	21.03	
Green	Geoff Collard	258	7.57	
Majority		685	20.09	
Turnout		3,409	38.37	N/A
Registered electors		8,884		N/A

=== Easton ===
Easton
Party	Candidate	Votes	%	±%
Liberal Democrats	John F. Kiely	1,840	52.54	
Liberal Democrats	Michael B. Smith	1,710	48.83	
Labour	Michael Langley	1,399	39.95	
Labour	David White	1,298	37.06	
Green	Robert Nicholls	165	4.71	
Conservative	Paul N. Hancock	146	4.17	
Majority		311	8.88	
Turnout		3,502	46.27	N/A
Registered electors		7,569		N/A

=== Eastville ===
Eastville
Party	Candidate	Votes	%	±%
Labour	Sally J. Andrews	1,785	57.28	
Labour	David Sutton	1,608	51.60	
Conservative	Lesley A. Alexander	850	27.28	
Conservative	Timothy C. Collins	799	25.64	
Liberal Democrats	Paul R. Potts	542	17.39	
Liberal Democrats	Roland I. Potts	447	14.35	
Majority		758	24.33	
Turnout		3,116	37.10	N/A
Registered electors		8,398		N/A

=== Filwood ===
Filwood
Party	Candidate	Votes	%	±%
Labour	Stephen James Grant	1,385	75.03	
Labour	George Micklewright	1,300	70.42	
Militant Labour	Ian P. Marshall	312	16.90	
Militant Labour	Wayne Coombes	251	13.60	
Conservative	Jonathan R. Hucker	159	8.61	
Green	Graham H. Davey	128	6.93	
Majority		988	53.52	
Turnout		1,846	27.44	N/A
Registered electors		6,728		N/A

=== Frome Vale ===
Frome Vale
Party	Candidate	Votes	%
Labour	Adrian Becker	2,264	
Labour	Anne M. Walder	1,952	
Conservative	Kenneth I. Blanchard	1,390	
Conservative	Victor C. Eaglestone	1,085	
Liberal Democrats	Stella J. Hender	425	
Liberal Democrats	Jean C. Norman	376	
Green	Simon D. Kellett	184	
Majority		562	13.2
Turnout			44.1

=== Hartcliffe ===
Hartcliffe
Party	Candidate	Votes	%
Labour	Bernard W. Chalmers	1,950	
Labour	Mervyn R. Hulin	1,754	
Conservative	Barrie R. Edwards	447	
Conservative	Jonathan D.R. Price	353	
Green	Susan P. Ball	194	
Majority		1,307	50.4
Turnout			31.2

=== Henbury ===
Henbury
Party	Candidate	Votes	%
Labour	Jack D. Fisk	2,353	
Labour	Richard J. Pyle	2,197	
Conservative	Donald C. Miller	942	
Conservative	Janet G. Reed	817	
Liberal Democrats	Anne W. Stephen	424	
Liberal Democrats	John W.A. Toye	311	
Majority		1,255	33.7
Turnout			47.4

=== Hengrove ===
Hengrove
Party	Candidate	Votes	%
Liberal Democrats	Judith M. Webb	2,079	
Liberal Democrats	Sandra S. Loader	1,937	
Labour	Michael J. Chivers	1,167	
Labour	Mohammad K. Ahmed	1,093	
Conservative	Brian W. Edwards	798	
Conservative	Steven M. Willis	760	
Majority		770	19.0
Turnout			40.0

=== Henleaze ===
Henleaze
Party	Candidate	Votes	%
Liberal Democrats	Rosalie M. Brown	2,198	
Conservative	Joyce M. Fey	2,051	
Conservative	John L. Portch	1,982	
Liberal Democrats	John E. Mortell	1,843	
Labour	Keith Evans	753	
Labour	Roger J. Livingston	657	
Majority		69	1.4
Turnout			55.7

=== Hillfields ===
Hillfields
Party	Candidate	Votes	%
Labour	Graham R. Robertson	2,043	
Labour	J. Douglas Naysmith	2,009	
Conservative	Barbara J. Moore	596	
Conservative	Alfred D. Seville	588	
Majority		1,413	53.5
Turnout			34.6

=== Horfield ===
Horfield
Party	Candidate	Votes	%
Labour	Arthur Massey	1,760	
Labour	David R. Poole	1,751	
Conservative	Betty J.D. Topham	1,441	
Conservative	Anthony J. Smith	1,279	
Liberal Democrats	Margaret S. Hodgkins	355	
Liberal Democrats	Sylvia E. Young	351	
Green	Peter M. Scott	105	
Majority		310	8.5
Turnout			46.1

=== Kingsweston ===
Kingsweston
Party	Candidate	Votes	%
Labour	Rosemary A. Clarke	1,944	
Labour	John T. Bees	1,934	
Conservative	Jeanne Veale	655	
Conservative	Richard L. Clifton	618	
Liberal Democrats	Andrew Ludlow	361	
Liberal Democrats	Francis R. Young	344	
Majority		1,279	43.2
Turnout			41.1

=== Knowle ===
Knowle
Party	Candidate	Votes	%
Labour	Tessa Coombes	1,774	
Labour	Patricia Roberts	1,672	
Conservative	John E. Gammon	576	
Liberal Democrats	Evelyn M. Elworthy	486	
Green	John M. Hills	205	
Majority		1,096	36.0
Turnout			35.8

=== Lawrence Hill ===
Lawrence Hill
Party	Candidate	Votes	%
Labour	Robert J. Channon	1,759	
Labour	Lesley Broomhead	1,718	
Liberal Democrats	Michael Baker	400	
Liberal Democrats	Paul Elvin	308	
Conservative	George E. Burton	264	
Majority		1,318	54.4
Turnout			29.2

=== Lockleaze ===
Lockleaze
Party	Candidate	Votes	%
Labour	Judy Patterson	1,880	
Labour	Philip W. Gregory	1,824	
Liberal Democrats	Joan Grace	636	
Liberal Democrats	Ian H. Parry	566	
Conservative	Christopher R. Stallabrass	347	
Conservative	Geoffrey R. Gollop	336	
Majority		1,188	41.5
Turnout			39.6

=== Redland ===
Redland
Party	Candidate	Votes	%
Labour	John Ashton	2,060	
Labour	Joan B. McLaren	1,989	
Conservative	Mark F.H. Casewell	1,102	
Conservative	Antony S. Waycott	1,086	
Liberal Democrats	Robert J. Wills	926	
Liberal Democrats	Michael J. Woods	841	
Macromedia Student	Sebastian A.H. Matthews	127	
Majority		887	21.0
Turnout			45.3

Sebastian Matthews, who apparently stood as the "Macromedia Student" party, is possibly a nomination-paper error where 'Occupation' and 'Party' were swapped, as occurred at the 1983 Bermondsey by-election.

=== Southmead ===
Southmead
Party	Candidate	Votes	%
Labour	Peter W. Hammond	1,745	
Labour	Jennifer M. Smith	1,699	
Conservative	Martin Kerry	599	
Conservative	Jarmila Parry	567	
Liberal Democrats	Carol F. Taylor	348	
Liberal Democrats	Simon R. Young	251	
Majority		1,100	40.9
Turnout			34.8

=== Southville ===
Southville
Party	Candidate	Votes	%
Labour	Andrew J. May	2,123	
Labour	David Johnson	2,104	
Conservative	Cora A.P. Stephenson	503	
Conservative	Neil A. Cuthbertson	478	
Liberal Democrats	Richard F. Hughes	411	
Green	Sigrid Shayer	357	
Majority		1,601	47.2
Turnout			38.1

=== St George East ===
St. George East
Party	Candidate	Votes	%
Labour	Charles S. Price	1,802	
Labour	Margaret A. Shovelton	1,778	
Conservative	Edward J. Withers	632	
Conservative	Derek A.E. Fey	629	
Liberal Democrats	Gordon H. Draper	508	
Liberal Democrats	Tony R. Potts	414	
Majority		1,146	39.0
Turnout			35.4

=== St George West ===
St. George West
Party	Candidate	Votes	%
Labour	John E. Deasy	2,062	
Labour	Ronald E. Stone	1,983	
Liberal Democrats	Gordon Williams	436	
Liberal Democrats	Kenneth M. Peacock	432	
Conservative	Derek V. Hooper	345	
Conservative	Marilyn Hutton	308	
Majority		1,547	54.4
Turnout			36.9

=== Stockwood ===
Stockwood
Party	Candidate	Votes	%
Labour	Robin Moss	2,002	
Conservative	Colin J.N. Williams	1,985	
Labour	David Spry	1,968	
Conservative	David H.R. Morris	1,820	
Liberal Democrats	Jane M. Collins	709	
Liberal Democrats	Rosemary A. Windmill	383	
Majority		17	0.4
Turnout			46.3

=== Stoke Bishop ===
Stoke Bishop
Party	Candidate	Votes	%
Conservative	Peter J. Abraham	2,051	
Conservative	Christopher M.B. Alderson	1,992	
Liberal Democrats	Keri A. Dow	1,034	
Liberal Democrats	Dennis H. Brown	961	
Labour	Luke Akehurst	769	
Labour	Edward F. Fowler	719	
Green	William F. McCaskie	160	
Majority		958	23.9
Turnout			39.6

=== Westbury-on-Trym ===
Westbury-on-Trym
Party	Candidate	Votes	%
Conservative	David H. Poole	2,614	
Conservative	Robert W. Wall	2,544	
Labour	Dick Drew	1,102	
Liberal Democrats	Carol K. Stratton	1,050	
Liberal Democrats	Antony A. Stratton	976	
Majority		1,442	30.3
Turnout			53.0

=== Whitchurch Park ===
Whitchurch Park
Party	Candidate	Votes	%
Labour	Helen Holland	2,025	
Labour	Paul Smith	2,008	
Conservative	Robert R. Morris	392	
Green	Christine J. Presley	187	
Majority		1,616	62.1
Turnout			31.7

=== Windmill Hill ===
Windmill Hill
Party	Candidate	Votes	%
Labour	Diane E. Bunyan	2,368	
Labour	Christopher L. Orlik	2,035	
Green	Anita J. Lewis	543	
Conservative	William R.J. Biggs	516	
Conservative	Lilian F. Biggs	506	
Majority		1,492	43.5
Turnout			32.3
