= List of electoral wards in Bristol =

This is a list of electoral divisions and wards in the ceremonial county of Bristol in South West England. All changes since the re-organisation of local government following the passing of the Local Government Act 1972 are shown. The number of councillors elected for each electoral division or ward is shown in brackets.

== Bristol City Council ==
=== Current wards ===
Map	Name	Councillors	2021 population	2024 electorate	Parliamentary constituency
	Ashley	3	20,003	14,256	Bristol Central
	Avonmouth and Lawrence Weston	3	22,166	15,909	Bristol North West
	Bedminster	2	12,916	10,052	Bristol South
	Bishopston and Ashley Down	2	13,304	8,954	Bristol North West
	Bishopsworth	2	12,274	9,337	Bristol South
	Brislington East	2	12,146	8,890	Bristol East
	Brislington West	2	11,880	8,985	Bristol East
	Central	2	18,390	8,958	Bristol Central
	Clifton	2	13,022	8,883	Bristol Central
	Clifton Down	2	11,420	7,695	Bristol Central
	Cotham	2	11,521	7,870	Bristol Central
	Easton	2	14,167	10,124	Bristol East
	Eastville	2	14,865	10,721	Bristol North East
	Filwood	2	14,299	10,084	Bristol South
	Frome Vale	2	14,057	9,958	Bristol North East
	Hartcliffe and Withywood	3	19,059	12,951	Bristol South
	Henbury and Brentry	2	13,208	9,601	Bristol North West
	Hengrove and Whitchurch Park	3	18,711	14,789	Bristol South
	Hillfields	2	13,153	9,226	Bristol North East
	Horfield	2	13,838	9,259	Bristol North West
	Hotwells and Harbourside	1	6,035	3,869	Bristol Central
	Knowle	2	14,046	10,076	Bristol East
	Lawrence Hill	2	19,604	11,667	Bristol East
	Lockleaze	2	13,396	9,396	Bristol North East
	Redland	2	13,253	9,963	Bristol Central
	Southmead	2	13,193	9,181	Bristol North West
	Southville	2	12,882	9,684	Bristol South
	St George Central	2	12,984	9,913	Bristol East
	St George Troopers Hill	1	6,459	4,663	Bristol East
	St George West	1	6,891	5,265	Bristol East
	Stockwood	2	11,880	8,956	Bristol East
	Stoke Bishop	2	13,067	8,316	Bristol North West
	Westbury-on-Trym and Henleaze	3	20,420	15,278	Bristol North West
	Windmill Hill	2	13,958	10,302	Bristol South
	Total	70	472,467	333,031	

=== Former wards ===
Wards from 1 April 1974 (first election 7 June 1973) to 5 May 1983:

1. Avon (3)
2. Bedminster (3)
3. Bishopston (3)
4. Bishopsworth (3)
5. Brislington (3)
6. Cabot (3)
7. Clifton (3)
8. District (3)
9. Durdham (3)
10. Easton (3)
11. Eastville (3)
12. Henbury (3)
13. Hengrove (3)
14. Hillfields (3)
15. Horfield (3)
16. Knowle (3)
17. Redland (3)
18. Somerset (3)
19. Southmead (3)
20. Southville (3)
21. St George East (3)
22. St George West (3)
23. St Paul (3)
24. St Philip & Jacob (3)
25. Stapleton (3)
26. Stockwood (3)
27. Westbury-on-Trym (3)
28. Windmill Hill (3)

Wards from 5 May 1983 to 6 May 1999:

Wards from 6 May 1999 to 5 May 2016:

1. Ashley (2)
2. Avonmouth (2)
3. Bedminster (2)
4. Bishopston (2)
5. Bishopsworth (2)
6. Brislington East (2)
7. Brislington West (2)
8. Cabot (2)
9. Clifton (2)
10. Clifton East (2)
11. Cotham (2)
12. Easton (2)
13. Eastville (2)
14. Filwood (2)
15. Frome Vale (2)
16. Hartcliffe (2)
17. Henbury (2)
18. Hengrove (2)
19. Henleaze (2)
20. Hillfields (2)
21. Horfield (2)
22. Kingsweston (2)
23. Knowle (2)
24. Lawrence Hill (2)
25. Lockleaze (2)
26. Redland (2)
27. St George East (2)
28. St George West (2)
29. Southmead (2)
30. Southville (2)
31. Stockwood (2)
32. Stoke Bishop (2)
33. Westbury-on-Trym (2)
34. Whitchurch Park (2)
35. Windmill Hill (2)

== Former county council ==
=== Avon ===
Electoral Divisions from 1 April 1974 (first election 12 April 1973) to 7 May 1981:

1. Axbridge No. 1 (1)
2. Axbridge No. 2 (1)
3. Bath No. 1 (1)
4. Bath No. 2 (1)
5. Bath No. 3 (1)
6. Bath No. 4 (1)
7. Bath No. 5 (1)
8. Bath No. 6 (1)
9. Bath No. 7 (1)
10. Bathavon No. 1 (1)
11. Bathavon No. 2 (1)
12. Bitton (1)
13. Bristol Avon (1)
14. Bristol Bedminster (1)
15. Bristol Bishopston (1)
16. Bristol Bishopsworth (1)
17. Bristol Brislington (1)
18. Bristol Cabot (1)
19. Bristol Clifton (1)
20. Bristol District (1)
21. Bristol Durdham (1)
22. Bristol Easton (1)
23. Bristol Eastville (1)
24. Bristol Henbury (2)
25. Bristol Hengrove (2)
26. Bristol Hillfields (1)
27. Bristol Horfield (1)
28. Bristol Knowle (1)
29. Bristol Redland (1)
30. Bristol Somerset (1)
31. Bristol Southmead (1)
32. Bristol Southville (1)
33. Bristol Ss Philip & Jacob (1)
34. Bristol St George East (1)
35. Bristol St George West (1)
36. Bristol St Paul (1)
37. Bristol Stapleton (2)
38. Bristol Stockwood (2)
39. Bristol Westbury-on-Trym (2)
40. Bristol Windmill Hill (1)
41. Clevedon (1)
42. Clutton No. 1 (1)
43. Clutton No. 2 (1)
44. Keynsham East (1)
45. Keynsham West (1)
46. Kingswood No. 1 (1)
47. Kingswood No. 2 (1)
48. Long Ashton No. 1 (1)
49. Long Ashton No. 2 (1)
50. Long Ashton No. 3 (1)
51. Mangotsfield No. 1 (1)
52. Mangotsfield No. 2 (1)
53. Norton/Radstock (1)
54. Portishead (1)
55. Siston (1)
56. Sodbury No. 1 (1)
57. Sodbury No. 2 (1)
58. Sodbury No. 3 (1)
59. Sodbury No. 4 (1)
60. Sodbury No. 5 (1)
61. Thornbury No. 1 (1)
62. Thornbury No. 2 (1)
63. Thornbury No. 3 (1)
64. Weston-super-Mare No. 1 (1)
65. Weston-super-Mare No. 2 (1)
66. Weston-super-Mare No. 3 (1)
67. Weston-super-Mare No. 4 (1)

Electoral Divisions from 7 May 1981 to 1 April 1996 (county abolished):

1. Ashley (1)
2. Avonmouth (1)
3. Bath Central (1)
4. Bath North East (1)
5. Bath North West (1)
6. Bath South (1)
7. Bath South East (1)
8. Bath South West (1)
9. Bath West (1)
10. Bathavon (1)
11. Bedminster (1)
12. Bishopston (1)
13. Bishopsworth (1)
14. Bitton (1)
15. Brislington East (1)
16. Brislington West (1)
17. Cabot (1)
18. Chew Valley (1)
19. Clevedon (1)
20. Clifton (1)
21. Cotham (1)
22. Downend (1)
23. Easton (1)
24. Eastville (1)
25. Filton (1)
26. Filwood (1)
27. Frome Vale (1)
28. Gordano Valley (1)
29. Hartcliffe (1)
30. Henbury (1)
31. Hengrove (1)
32. Henleaze (1)
33. Hillfields (1)
34. Horfield (1)
35. Keynsham East (1)
36. Keynsham West (1)
37. Kings Chase (1)
38. Kingsweston (1)
39. Knowle (1)
40. Ladden Brook (1)
41. Lawrence Hill (1)
42. Lockleaze (1)
43. Longwell Green (1)
44. Midsomer Norton (1)
45. Mount Hill (1)
46. Nailsea (1)
47. Patchway (1)
48. Portishead (1)
49. Priory (1)
50. Radstock (1)
51. Redland (1)
52. Rodway (1)
53. Severn Vale (1)
54. Siston (1)
55. Sodbury (1)
56. Southmead (1)
57. Southville (1)
58. St George East (1)
59. St George West (1)
60. Stockwood (1)
61. Stoke Bishop (1)
62. The Combe (1)
63. Thornbury (1)
64. Westbury-on-Trym (1)
65. Weston East (1)
66. Weston North (1)
67. Weston South (1)
68. Weston West (1)
69. Whitchurch Park (1)
70. Wick (1)
71. Windmill Hill (1)
72. Winscombe & Wrington Vale (1)
73. Winterbourne (1)
74. Worle (1)
75. Yate (1)
76. Yatton & Yeo Moor (1)

== See also ==
- List of parliamentary constituencies in Avon
- Bristol City Council Ward list
