= 2001 Bristol City Council election =

2001 UK local government election

- 7 June 2001

24 of 70 seats (One Third) to Bristol City Council 36 seats needed for a majority
- Registered: 189,226
- Turnout: 61.7%

	Majority party	Minority party	Third party
Leader	George Micklewright	Barbara Janke	Peter Abraham
Party	Labour	Liberal Democrats	Conservative
Leader since	2 May 1997	15 May 1997	14 January 1999
Leader's seat	Filwood	Clifton	Stoke Bishop
Last election	37	23	10
Seats before	10	11	3
Seats won	14	8	2
Seats after	40	21	9
Seat change	▲4	▼3	▼1
Popular vote	42,464	38,696	28,574
Percentage	36.3%	33.1%	24.4%
Swing	▲1.6%	▲1.8%	▼1.8%
	Fourth party
Party	Green
Last election	0
Seats before	0
Seats won	0
Seats after	0
Seat change	Steady
Popular vote	6,492
Percentage	5.6%
Swing	▼0.7%
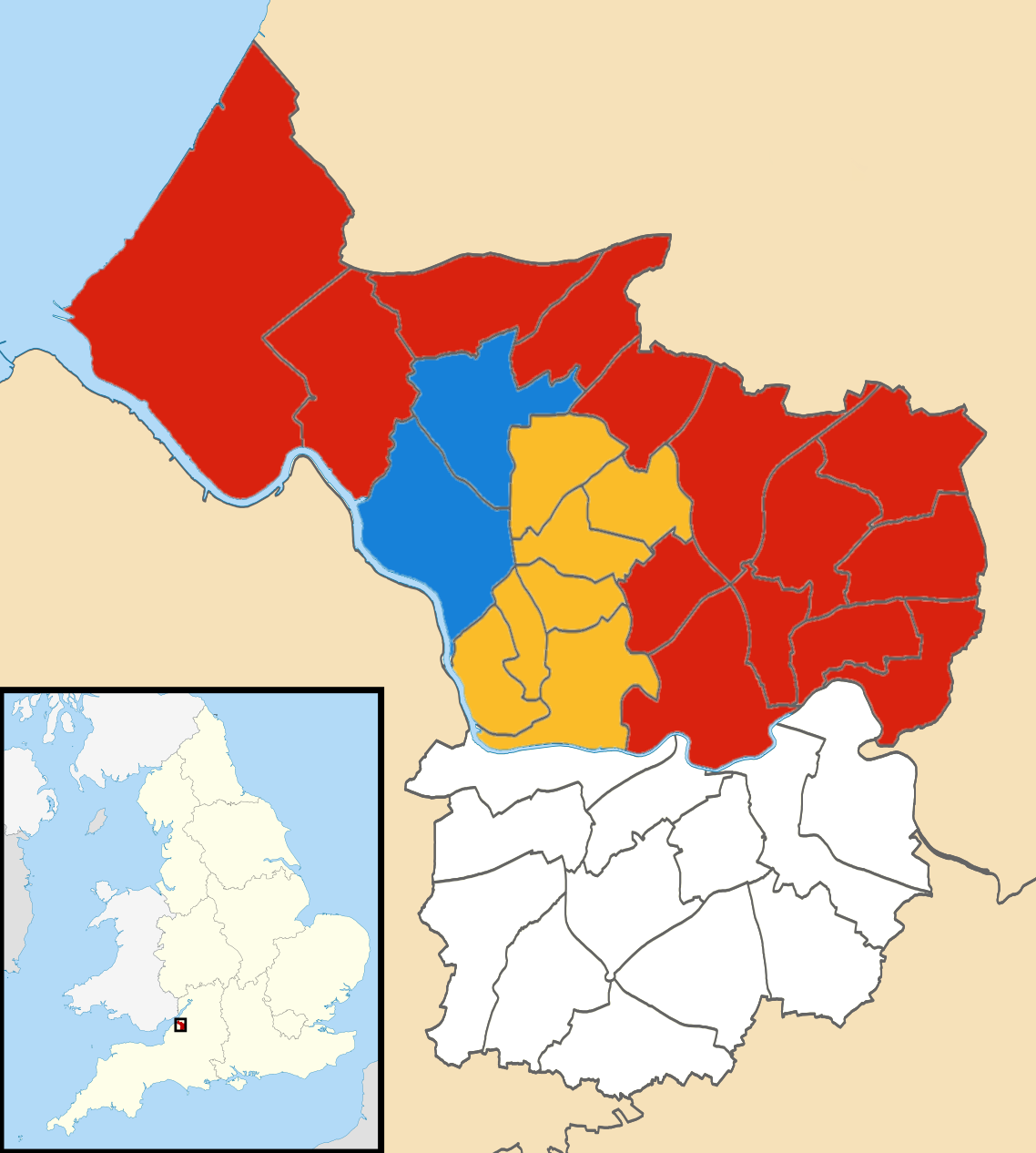
- 2001 local election results in Bristol
Council Leader before election before election
George Micklewright
Labour
Council Leader after election
George Micklewright
Labour

The 2001 Bristol City Council election took place on 7 June 2001, on the same day as a general election and other local elections. The Labour Party made a small number of gains and maintained overall control of the council.

== Background ==
The elections were delayed from the usual date of the first Thursday in May due to the 2001 foot and mouth crisis.

== Previous composition ==
=== 1999 election ===
Party	Seats
Labour	37
Liberal Democrats	23
Conservative	10
Total	70

=== Composition of council seats before election ===
Party	Seats
Labour	36
Liberal Democrats	24
Conservative	10
Total	70

== Summary ==
=== Election result ===
2001 Bristol City Council election
Party	This election				Full council			This election		
Party	Candidates	Seats	Net	Seats %	Other	Total	Total %	Votes	Votes %	+/−
Labour	24	14	▲4	58.3	26	40	57.1	42,464	36.3	▲1.6
Liberal Democrats	24	8	▼3	33.3	13	21	30.0	38,696	33.1	▲1.9
Conservative	24	2	▼1	8.3	7	9	12.9	28,574	24.4	▼1.8
Green	22	0	Steady	0.0	0	0	0.0	6,492	5.6	▼0.7
Socialist Labour	2	0	Steady	0.0	0	0	0.0	305	0.3	▼0.7
Socialist	3	0	Steady	0.0	0	0	0.0	273	0.2	▼0.3
Independent	1	0	Steady	0.0	0	0	0.0	70	0.1	N/a
Total	100	24	Steady		46	70		116,842		

Popular vote
Labour	36.33%
Liberal Democrats	33.11%
Conservative	24.45%
Green	5.55%
Other	0.55%

Council seats
Labour	58.33%
Liberal Democrats	33.33%
Conservative	8.33%

Bristol City Council composition following the 2001 election

=== Election of Group Leaders ===
George Micklewright (Filwood) was re-elected leader of the Labour Group, Barbara Janke (Clifton) was re-elected leader of the Liberal Democrats group and Peter Abraham (Stoke Bishop) was re-elected leader of the Conservative group.

== Government Formation ==
George Micklewright the leader of the Labour group was duly elected leader of the council and formed a labour administration.

== Ward results ==
=== Ashley ===
Ashley
Party	Candidate	Votes	%	±%
Labour	Dudley Saward	2,161	41.1	+5.7
Liberal Democrats	Trevor Riddlestone *	1,708	32.5	+1.5
Green	David Simpson	737	14.0	–6.6
Conservative	Adam Tayler	344	6.5	+2.7
Socialist Labour	Bernard Kennedy	233	4.4	–4.5
Independent	Mystic Merlin	70	1.3	N/a
Majority		453	8.6	N/a
Rejected ballots		35	0.4	+0.2
Turnout		5,288	61.6	+26.7
Registered electors		8,587		+0.8
Labour gain from Liberal Democrats		Swing	+2.1	

=== Avonmouth ===
Avonmouth
Party	Candidate	Votes	%	±%
Labour	Pat Roberts *	2,921	51.8	+4.9
Conservative	Spud Murphy	1,805	32.0	–0.7
Liberal Democrats	Martyn Dunn	729	12.9	–1.4
Green	Luke Burns	179	3.2	–2.7
Majority		1,116	19.8	+5.6
Rejected ballots		11	0.2	+0.2
Turnout		5,645	62.7	+26.2
Registered electors		9,006		+0.1
Labour hold		Swing	+2.8	

=== Bishopston ===
Bishopston
Party	Candidate	Votes	%	±%
Liberal Democrats	Beverley Knott *	2,877	47.8	+2.2
Labour	Patricia McLaren	2,008	33.4	–3.3
Conservative	Richard Manns	712	11.8	+2.9
Green	Harry Harvey	423	7.0	–1.8
Majority		869	14.4	+5.4
Rejected ballots		20	0.3	+0.1
Turnout		6,040	68.8	+27.6
Registered electors		8,781		–0.8
Liberal Democrats hold		Swing	+2.7	

=== Cabot ===
Cabot
Party	Candidate	Votes	%	±%
Liberal Democrats	Victor Tallis *	1,825	46.2	–8.3
Labour	Carole Gyorffy	1,085	27.4	+5.6
Conservative	Stuart Quayle	658	16.6	+3.6
Green	Charles Bolton	385	9.7	–0.9
Majority		740	18.7	–13.9
Rejected ballots		34	0.9	+0.7
Turnout		3,987	52.1	+27.5
Registered electors		7,651		+1.7
Liberal Democrats hold		Swing	–6.9	

=== Clifton ===
Clifton
Party	Candidate	Votes	%	±%
Liberal Democrats	Brian Price *	2,317	48.1	–2.4
Conservative	Royston Pepworth	1,159	24.1	–0.3
Labour	Roger White	930	19.3	+3.1
Green	John Davaney	411	8.5	–0.4
Majority		1,158	24.0	–2.2
Rejected ballots		16	0.3	+0.2
Turnout		4,833	61.9	+27.8
Registered electors		7,806		+0.4
Liberal Democrats hold		Swing	–1.1	

=== Clifton East ===
Clifton East
Party	Candidate	Votes	%	±%
Liberal Democrats	Simon Cook *	1,990	45.1	+2.3
Conservative	Michael Cobb	1,221	27.7	–4.5
Labour	John Curran	876	19.8	+2.9
Green	Lela McTernan	328	7.4	–0.8
Majority		769	17.4	+6.8
Rejected ballots		15	0.3	+0.3
Turnout		4,430	57.0	+30.2
Registered electors		7,769		–1.1
Liberal Democrats hold		Swing	+3.4	

=== Cotham ===
Cotham (2)
Party	Candidate	Votes	%	±%
Liberal Democrats	Evelyn Elworthy	2,425	40.3	–3.4
Liberal Democrats	Barrington Dodd *	2,373		
Labour	Louise-Marie Davies	1,560	25.9	–4.6
Labour	Kerry Barker	1,401		
Conservative	Susan Fleming	1,037	17.2	+4.1
Green	Geoff Collard	1,001	16.6	+3.7
Conservative	Harold Webb	899		
Majority		865	14.4	+1.3
Rejected ballots		22	0.4	+0.3
Turnout		5,446	62.8	+32.4
Registered electors		8,671		–1.3
Liberal Democrats hold		Swing	+0.6	
Liberal Democrats hold				

=== Easton ===
Easton
Party	Candidate	Votes	%	±%
Labour	Robin Moss	1,987	42.8	+11.3
Liberal Democrats	Muriel Cole *	1,778	38.3	–13.2
Green	Caroline Lewis	413	8.9	+0.5
Conservative	Guy Dawe	308	6.6	+2.3
Socialist	Bill Cox	152	3.3	–0.9
Majority		209	4.5	–15.4
Rejected ballots		79	1.7	
Turnout		4,717	56.9	
Registered electors		8,294		
Labour gain from Liberal Democrats		Swing	+12.2	

=== Eastville ===
Eastville
Party	Candidate	Votes	%	±%
Labour	Jude Patterson	1,873	37.5	+8.4
Liberal Democrats	Tony Locke	1,837	36.7	–16.3
Conservative	Lesley Alexander	948	19.0	+8.6
Green	Martin Cottingham	273	5.5	+5.0
Socialist	Mark Baker	68	1.4	–1.2
Majority		36	0.7	N/a
Rejected ballots		22	0.4	+0.1
Turnout		5,021	57.8	+26.5
Registered electors		8,684		–0.3
Labour gain from Liberal Democrats		Swing	+12.4	

=== Frome Vale ===
Frome Vale
Party	Candidate	Votes	%	±%
Labour	Alun Davies *	2,353	45.6	–3.8
Conservative	Ilse Temple	1,659	32.2	–0.4
Liberal Democrats	Roland Potts	970	18.8	+4.3
Green	Erica Rooney	175	3.4	N/a
Majority		694	13.5	–3.5
Rejected ballots		32	0.6	+0.3
Turnout		5,189	63.0	+27.1
Registered electors		8,240		+0.3
Labour hold		Swing	–1.7	

=== Henbury ===
Henbury
Party	Candidate	Votes	%	±%
Labour	Richard Pyle *	2,407	52.6	–4.7
Conservative	Douglas Dowling	1,318	28.8	–2.0
Liberal Democrats	Carol Knight	851	18.6	+6.7
Majority		1,089	23.8	–2.7
Rejected ballots		16	0.3	+0.2
Turnout		4,592	62.5	+27.0
Registered electors		7,345		–0.5
Labour hold		Swing	–1.4	

=== Henleaze ===
Henleaze
Party	Candidate	Votes	%	±%
Liberal Democrats	Dennis Brown *	3,675	58.9	+6.6
Conservative	Christopher Windows	1,648	26.4	–7.1
Labour	Keith Evans	761	12.2	+2.0
Green	John Hills	153	2.5	–1.6
Majority		2,027	32.5	+13.7
Rejected ballots		19	0.3	+0.2
Turnout		6,256	78.4	+27.0
Registered electors		7,977		–2.1
Liberal Democrats hold		Swing	+6.9	

=== Hillfields ===
Hillfields
Party	Candidate	Votes	%	±%
Labour	Noreen Daniels	2,811	52.4	+0.5
Liberal Democrats	John Hassell	1,276	23.8	+4.9
Conservative	Colin Bretherton	1,087	20.3	–4.8
Green	Glenn Vowles	190	3.5	N/a
Majority		1,535	28.6	+1.9
Rejected ballots		29	0.5	+0.3
Turnout		5,393	59.9	+30.7
Registered electors		9,006		+0.4
Labour hold		Swing	+0.9	

=== Horfield ===
Horfield
Party	Candidate	Votes	%	±%
Labour	Kathleen Walker	2,173	40.5	+2.4
Conservative	Alan Bailey *	1,819	33.9	–10.1
Liberal Democrats	Andrew Ludlow	1,123	21.0	+7.3
Green	Lucy Rees	244	4.6	+0.4
Majority		354	6.6	N/a
Rejected ballots		19	0.4	+0.3
Turnout		5,378	63.3	+26.7
Registered electors		8,494		–2.4
Labour gain from Conservative		Swing	+6.3	

=== Kingsweston ===
Kingsweston
Party	Candidate	Votes	%	±%
Labour	Judith Price	2,018	42.9	+2.8
Liberal Democrats	Terence Thomas	1,394	29.7	–0.1
Conservative	Christine Taylor	1,288	27.4	+1.3
Majority		624	13.3	+2.9
Rejected ballots		17	0.4	+0.3
Turnout		4,717	62.9	+27.6
Registered electors		7,500		+0.2
Labour hold		Swing	+1.5	

=== Lawrence Hill ===
Lawrence Hill
Party	Candidate	Votes	%	±%
Labour	Brenda Hugill *	2,023	49.7	+5.8
Liberal Democrats	John Astley	1,402	34.4	–2.7
Conservative	George Burton	382	9.4	+1.8
Green	Maxine Gilman	195	4.8	–1.1
Socialist Labour	Giles Shorter	72	1.8	–3.8
Majority		621	15.2	8.4
Rejected ballots		62	1.5	+1.3
Turnout		4,136	47.3	+19.8
Registered electors		8,752		+1.4
Labour hold		Swing	+4.2	

=== Lockleaze ===
Lockleaze
Party	Candidate	Votes	%	±%
Labour	Arthur Massey *	2,119	48.3	–0.5
Liberal Democrats	Stella Hender	1,441	32.8	+9.2
Conservative	Matthew Stallabrass	676	15.4	–5.8
Green	Samantha Thompson	151	3.4	–2.8
Majority		678	15.5	–9.7
Rejected ballots		12	0.3	+0.2
Turnout		4,399	56.4	+28.0
Registered electors		7,799		–1.0
Labour hold		Swing	–4.9	

=== Redland ===
Redland
Party	Candidate	Votes	%	±%
Liberal Democrats	James White *	2,597	45.8	+13.8
Labour	Edmund Bramall	1,363	24.0	–4.4
Conservative	Julian Taylor	1,250	22.1	–5.2
Green	Justin Quinnell	458	8.1	–4.3
Majority		1,234	21.8	+18.3
Rejected ballots		16	0.3	+0.2
Turnout		5,684	69.6	+28.4
Registered electors		8,165		–3.5
Liberal Democrats hold		Swing	+9.1	

=== Southmead ===
Southmead
Party	Candidate	Votes	%	±%
Labour	Peter Hammond *	2,261	54.8	–1.3
Liberal Democrats	Anthony Smith	953	23.1	+3.6
Conservative	Shaun Jones	910	22.1	+1.5
Majority		1,308	31.7	–3.8
Rejected ballots		20	0.5	+0.3
Turnout		4,144	53.7	+30.6
Registered electors		7,715		+1.0
Labour hold		Swing	–2.4	

=== St George East ===
St George East
Party	Candidate	Votes	%	±%
Labour	Charles Price *	2,464	48.9	–3.3
Conservative	James Hinchcliffe	1,401	27.8	+0.3
Liberal Democrats	Gordon Draper	1,003	19.9	–0.3
Green	Donald Brown	166	3.3	N/a
Majority		1,063	21.1	–3.6
Rejected ballots		25	0.5	+0.2
Turnout		5,059	57.7	+30.2
Registered electors		8,775		–0.2
Labour hold		Swing	–1.8	

=== St George West ===
St George West
Party	Candidate	Votes	%	±%
Labour	Ronald Stone *	2,447	53.0	–7.0
Liberal Democrats	Dayley Lawrence	1,127	24.4	+2.1
Conservative	Charles Alexander	828	17.9	+0.2
Green	Graham Davey	162	3.5	N/a
Socialist	Andrew Pryor	53	1.1	N/a
Majority		1,320	28.6	–9.1
Rejected ballots		12	0.3	–0.1
Turnout		4,629	57.5	+30.3
Registered electors		8,056		+1.9
Labour hold		Swing	–4.6	

=== Stoke Bishop ===
Stoke Bishop
Party	Candidate	Votes	%	±%
Conservative	Peter Abraham *	3,018	54.1	–6.0
Liberal Democrats	Fleming Carswell	1,458	26.1	+4.6
Labour	Dianne Manning	841	15.1	+2.3
Green	Keith Wiltshire	261	4.7	–0.9
Majority		1,560	28.0	–10.6
Rejected ballots		16	0.3	+0.2
Turnout		5,594	70.5	+31.7
Registered electors		7,939		–2.2
Conservative hold		Swing	–5.3	

=== Westbury-on-Trym ===
Westbury-on-Trym
Party	Candidate	Votes	%	±%
Conservative	Geoff Gollop	2,992	47.9	–10.7
Liberal Democrats	Nicholas Doddrell	2,046	32.8	+14.5
Labour	Judith Sluglett	1,022	16.4	–1.4
Green	Christina Stockdale	187	3.0	–2.3
Majority		946	15.1	–25.2
Rejected ballots		18	0.3	+0.2
Turnout		6,265	76.3	+30.8
Registered electors		8,214		–2.2
Conservative hold		Swing	–12.6	
