= 1999 Bristol City Council election =

1999 UK local government election

- 6 May 1999

All 70 seats to Bristol City Council 36 seats needed for a majority
- Registered: 290,590
- Turnout: 33.2

	Majority party	Minority party	Third party
Leader	George Micklewright	Barbara Janke	Peter Abraham
Party	Labour	Liberal Democrats	Conservative
Leader since	2 May 1997	15 May 1997	14 January 1999
Leader's seat	Filwood	Clifton	Stoke Bishop
Last election	46	16	6
Seats before	45	17	6
Seats won	37	23	10
Seat change	▼8	▲6	▲4
Popular vote	39,082	29,116	27,331
Percentage	37.6%	28.0%	26.3%
	Fourth party
Party	Green
Last election	0
Seats before	0
Seats won	0
Seat change	Steady
Popular vote	6,690
Percentage	6.4%
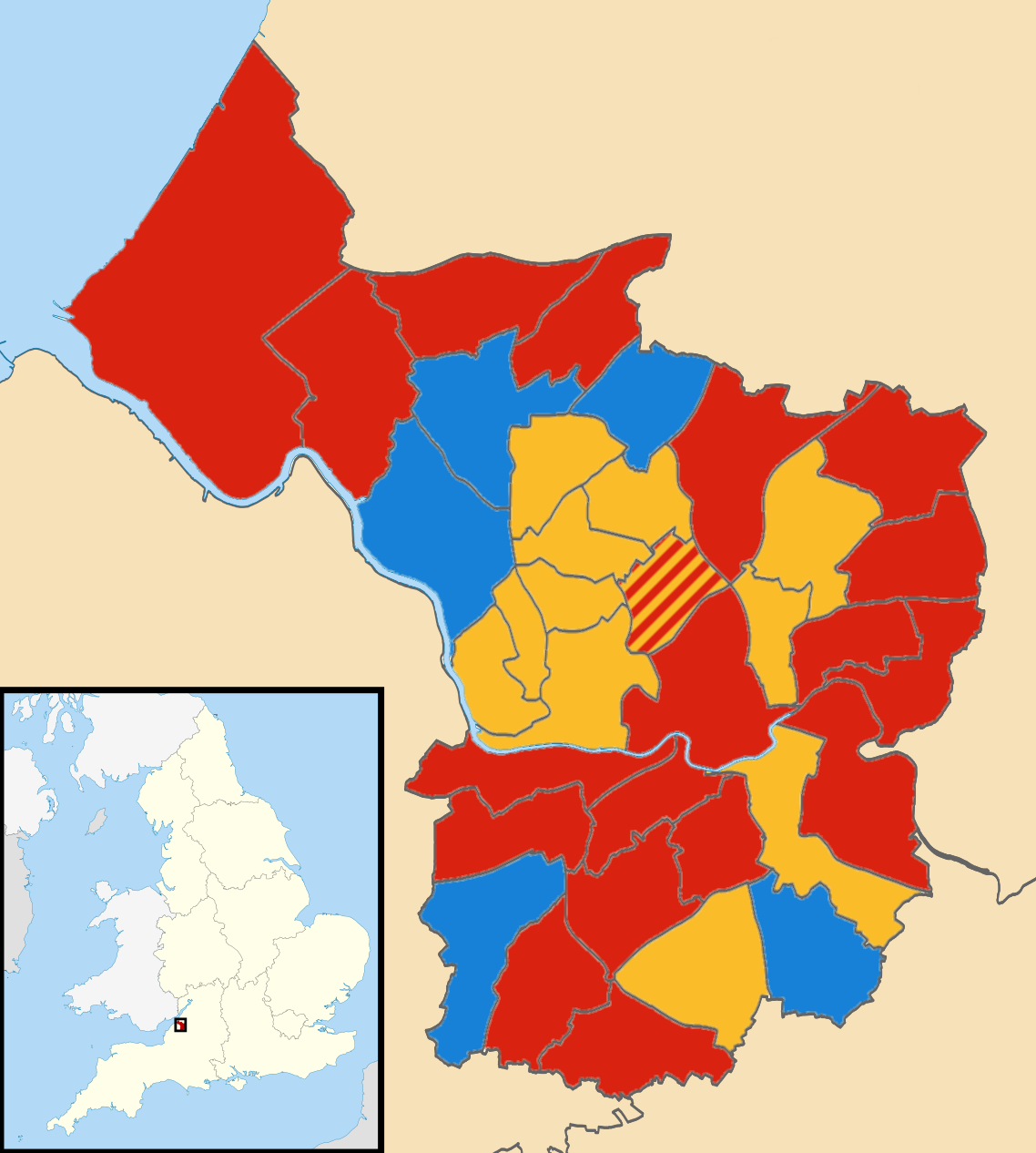
- 1999 local election results in Bristol
Council Leader before election before election
George Micklewright
Labour
Council Leader after election
George Micklewright
Labour

The 1999 Bristol City Council election took place on 6 May 1999, on the same day as other local elections. All seats were up for election due to boundary changes, with each ward electing 2 councillors. The total number of seats on the council increased by 2 due to the creation of a new ward: Clifton East.

Despite losing seats to both the Liberal Democrats and the Conservatives, the Labour Party maintained control of the council with a slim overall majority.

== Background ==
In August 1998, over the objections of the ruling Labour group, Local Government Minister Hilary Armstrong ordered a full council election to be held in May 1999.

== Summary ==
=== Election result ===
Bristol City Council election
Party	Candidates	Seats	Gains	Losses	Net gain/loss	Seats %	Votes %	Votes	+/−
Labour	70	37	Steady	8	▼8	52.9	37.4	39,082	
Liberal Democrats	70	23	6	Steady	▲6	32.9	27.9	29,116	
Conservative	61	10	4	Steady	▲4	14.3	26.7	27,331	
Green	29	0	Steady	Steady	Steady	0.0	6.4	6,690	
Socialist	9	0	Steady	Steady	Steady	0.0	0.8	846	
Socialist Labour	7	0	Steady	Steady	Steady	0.0	0.8	790	
Total	246	70	▲2					96,494	

Popular vote
Labour	37.63%
Liberal Democrats	28.04%
Conservative	26.32%
Green	6.44%
Other	1.58%

Council seats
Labour	52.86%
Liberal Democrats	32.86%
Conservative	14.29%

=== Election of Group Leaders ===
George Micklewright (Filwood) was re-elected leader of the Labour Group, Barbara Janke (Clifton) was re-elected leader of the Liberal Democrats group and Peter Abraham (Stoke Bishop) was re-elected leader of the Conservative group.

== Government Formation ==
George Micklewright the leader of the Labour group was duly elected leader of the council and formed a labour administration.

== Ward results ==
=== Ashley ===
Ashley (2)
Party	Candidate	Votes	%
Labour	Helga Benson	1,311	35.5
Liberal Democrats	Trevor Riddlestone *	1,147	31.0
Liberal Democrats	Sean Emmett	1,013	
Labour	Robin Moss	955	
Green	David Mark Simpson	764	20.7
Socialist Labour	Bernard Joseph Kennedy	331	9.0
Conservative	Ian Henderson	142	3.8
Majority		164	4.4
Rejected ballots		6	0.2
Turnout		2,970	34.9
Registered electors		8,517	
Labour win (new boundaries)			
Liberal Democrats win (new boundaries)			

=== Avonmouth ===
Avonmouth
Party	Candidate	Votes	%
Labour	Celia Lukins *	1,912	47.0
Labour	Patricia Roberts	1,486	
Conservative	Albert Murphy	1,334	32.8
Liberal Democrats	Paul Lloyd	584	14.4
Liberal Democrats	Sheila Mercer	344	
Green	Lela McTernan	239	5.9
Majority		578	14.2
Rejected ballots		1	0.0
Turnout		3,285	36.5
Registered electors		9,000	
Labour win (new boundaries)			
Labour win (new boundaries)			

=== Bedminster ===
Bedminster
Party	Candidate	Votes	%
Labour	Peter Crispin *	1,397	47.9
Labour	Claire Warren *	1,184	
Conservative	Christian Simpson	567	19.5
Liberal Democrats	William Guest	552	18.9
Liberal Democrats	Michael Twohig	391	
Green	Peter Andrews	299	10.3
Socialist	Wayne Coombes	100	3.4
Majority		830	28.5
Rejected ballots		5	0.2
Turnout		2,383	27.7
Registered electors		8,615	
Labour win (new boundaries)			
Labour win (new boundaries)			

=== Bishopston ===
Bishopston
Party	Candidate	Votes	%
Liberal Democrats	David Kitson *	1,805	45.6
Liberal Democrats	Beverley Knott	1,568	
Labour	Patricia McLaren	1,449	36.6
Labour	Arthur Keefe *	1,336	
Conservative	Richard Manns	353	8.9
Green	Ian Coates	349	8.8
Conservative	Oliver Mead	333	
Majority		356	9.0
Rejected ballots		8	0.2
Turnout		3,649	41.2
Registered electors		8,855	
Liberal Democrats win (new boundaries)			
Liberal Democrats win (new boundaries)			

=== Bishopsworth ===
Bishopsworth
Party	Candidate	Votes	%
Conservative	Richard Eddy	2,295	59.6
Conservative	Ronald Hodges	1,969	
Labour	Geoffrey Clarke	1,112	28.9
Labour	Paul Walker *	992	
Green	Barrie Lewis	237	6.2
Liberal Democrats	Jean Lemin	209	5.4
Liberal Democrats	David Rothwell	143	
Majority		1,183	30.7
Rejected ballots		3	
Turnout		3,548	41.7
Registered electors		8,506	
Conservative win (new boundaries)			
Conservative win (new boundaries)			

=== Brislington East ===
Brislington East
Party	Candidate	Votes	%
Labour	Peter Begley *	1,552	54.0
Labour	William Martin *	1,364	
Conservative	Colin Bretherton	718	25.0
Conservative	Craig Heeley	608	
Liberal Democrats	Paul Elvin	311	10.8
Liberal Democrats	Yvonne Potts	272	
Socialist Labour	Brian Corbett	158	5.5
Green	Jacqueline Allison	135	4.7
Majority		834	29.0
Rejected ballots		8	0.3
Turnout		2,631	30.2
Registered electors		8,725	
Labour win (new boundaries)			
Labour win (new boundaries)			

=== Brislington West ===
Brislington West
Party	Candidate	Votes	%
Liberal Democrats	Jacqueline Norman *	1,541	52.2
Liberal Democrats	Peter Main *	1,537	
Labour	Anthony Poole	835	28.3
Labour	Simon Crew	820	
Conservative	Robert Britton	467	15.8
Conservative	Beryl McGarry	436	
Green	Maureen Arnaiz	111	3.8
Majority		706	23.9
Rejected ballots		1	0.0
Turnout		2,915	36.7
Registered electors		7,952	
Liberal Democrats win (new boundaries)			
Liberal Democrats win (new boundaries)			

=== Cabot ===
Cabot
Party	Candidate	Votes	%
Liberal Democrats	Anne White *	1,091	54.5
Liberal Democrats	Victor Tallis	996	
Labour	Margaret Bannerman	438	21.9
Labour	Glynthea Modood	438	
Conservative	Ashley Fox	261	13.0
Conservative	James Baillieu	238	
Green	Thomas Kilner	212	10.6
Majority		653	32.6
Rejected ballots		2	
Turnout		1,855	24.7
Registered electors		7,524	
Liberal Democrats win (new boundaries)			
Liberal Democrats win (new boundaries)			

=== Clifton ===
Clifton
Party	Candidate	Votes	%
Liberal Democrats	Barbara Janke *	1,441	50.5
Liberal Democrats	Brian Price *	1,287	
Conservative	Pearl Abraham	694	24.3
Conservative	Patricia Tyreman	693	
Labour	Bhupinder Sandhu	463	16.2
Labour	Alan Rogan	396	
Green	Gundula Dorey	254	8.9
Majority		747	26.2
Rejected ballots		3	0.1
Turnout		2,648	34.1
Registered electors		7,771	
Liberal Democrats win (new boundaries)			
Liberal Democrats win (new boundaries)			

=== Clifton East ===
Clifton East
Party	Candidate	Votes	%
Liberal Democrats	Geoffrey Jones	886	42.8
Liberal Democrats	Simon Cook	829	
Conservative	Philip Cobbold	666	32.1
Conservative	Robert Marven	628	
Labour	Edmund Bramall	350	16.9
Labour	Sally Purves	347	
Green	John Hills	170	8.2
Majority		220	10.6
Rejected ballots		1	0.0
Turnout		2,107	26.8
Registered electors		7,856	
Liberal Democrats win (new seat)			
Liberal Democrats win (new seat)			

=== Cotham ===
Cotham
Party	Candidate	Votes	%
Liberal Democrats	Colin Eldridge *	1,306	43.6
Liberal Democrats	Barrington Dodd *	1,226	
Labour	Louise Davies	913	30.5
Labour	Robert Knowles-Leak	712	
Conservative	Michael Cobb	392	13.1
Green	Geoff Collard	387	12.9
Conservative	Harold Webb	328	
Majority		393	13.1
Rejected ballots		3	0.1
Turnout		2,667	30.37
Registered electors		8,782	
Liberal Democrats win (new boundaries)			
Liberal Democrats win (new boundaries)			

=== Easton ===
Easton
Party	Candidate	Votes	%
Liberal Democrats	John Kiely *	1,495	51.5
Liberal Democrats	Muriel Cole	1,410	
Labour	Fabian Breckles	916	31.6
Labour	David Sutton	818	
Green	Aidan Knapp	244	8.4
Conservative	Jean Bowrey	127	4.4
Socialist Labour	Kenneth Davison	121	4.2
Conservative	Lee Walker	100	
Majority		579	19.9
Rejected ballots		7	0.3
Turnout		2,683	32.5
Registered electors		8,257	
Liberal Democrats win (new boundaries)			
Liberal Democrats win (new boundaries)			

=== Eastville ===
Eastville
Party	Candidate	Votes	%
Liberal Democrats	Paul Potts *	1,401	48.9
Liberal Democrats	Anthony Wood *	1,271	
Labour	Raymond Shute	767	26.8
Labour	Mohammad Ahmed	676	
Conservative	Lesley Alexander	472	16.5
Conservative	George Burton	422	
Green	Graham Davey	132	4.6
Socialist	Mark Baker	95	3.3
Socialist	Nicola Mayger	73	
Majority		634	22.1
Rejected ballots		8	0.3
Turnout		2,731	31.3
Registered electors		8,713	
Liberal Democrats win (new boundaries)			
Liberal Democrats win (new boundaries)			

=== Filwood ===
Filwood
Party	Candidate	Votes	%
Labour	Kelvin Blake *	1,146	50.4
Labour	George Micklewright *	1,048	
Liberal Democrats	Ann Cooper	887	39.0
Liberal Democrats	Linda Hopkins	871	
Conservative	Jonathan Hucker	148	6.5
Socialist	Christine Marshall	94	4.1
Socialist	Robin Clapp	44	
Majority		259	11.4
Rejected ballots		4	0.2
Turnout		2,192	27.6
Registered electors		7,928	
Labour win (new boundaries)			
Labour win (new boundaries)			

=== Frome Vale ===
Frome Vale
Party	Candidate	Votes	%
Labour	Adrian Becker *	1,512	49.5
Labour	Alun Davies *	1,354	
Conservative	Victor Eaglestone	994	32.5
Conservative	Isle Temple	945	
Liberal Democrats	Ronald Potts	442	14.5
Liberal Democrats	Betty Sheppard	380	
Socialist Labour	Michael Langley	108	3.5
Majority		518	17.0
Rejected ballots		8	0.3
Turnout		2,948	35.9
Registered electors		8,214	
Labour win (new boundaries)			
Labour win (new boundaries)			

=== Hartcliffe ===
Hartcliffe
Party	Candidate	Votes	%
Labour	Bernard Chalmers *	1,292	58.1
Labour	Mervyn Hulin *	1,154	
Conservative	Shirley Hodges	513	23.1
Conservative	Jonathan Price	494	
Liberal Democrats	Evelyn Elworthy	303	13.6
Liberal Democrats	Nicholas Doddrell	293	
Green	Susan Ball	117	5.3
Majority		779	35.0
Rejected ballots		2	0.1
Turnout		2,120	26.1
Registered electors		8,111	
Labour win (new boundaries)			
Labour win (new boundaries)			

=== Henbury ===
Henbury
Party	Candidate	Votes	%
Labour	Claire Cook *	1,501	57.3
Labour	Richard Pyle *	1,480	
Conservative	Anthony Smith	806	30.8
Conservative	Matthew Stallabrass	756	
Liberal Democrats	Christine Napier	312	11.9
Liberal Democrats	Pamela Henderson	305	
Majority		695	26.5
Rejected ballots		5	
Turnout		2,619	35.5
Registered electors		7,380	
Labour win (new boundaries)			
Labour win (new boundaries)			

=== Hengrove ===
Hengrove
Party	Candidate	Votes	%
Liberal Democrats	Judith Webb *	1,279	37.7
Liberal Democrats	Mary Sykes	1,050	
Conservative	Richard Carter	1,027	30.3
Labour	Barry Clark	1,012	29.8
Conservative	Steven Willis	943	
Labour	Richard Hughes	906	
Green	Mary Wood	73	2.2
Majority		252	7.4
Rejected ballots		3	0.1
Turnout		3,192	36.4
Registered electors		8,776	
Liberal Democrats win (new boundaries)			
Liberal Democrats win (new boundaries)			

=== Henleaze ===
Henleaze
Party	Candidate	Votes	%
Liberal Democrats	Rosalie Brown *	2,306	52.3
Liberal Democrats	Dennis Brown *	2,106	
Conservative	Geoff Gollop	1,477	33.5
Conservative	John Goulandris	1,384	
Labour	Keith Evans	450	10.2
Labour	Judith Borodkine	396	
Green	Keith Wiltshire	178	4.0
Majority		829	18.8
Rejected ballots		4	0.1
Turnout		4,190	51.4
Registered electors		8,148	
Liberal Democrats win (new boundaries)			
Liberal Democrats win (new boundaries)			

=== Hillfields ===
Hillfields
Party	Candidate	Votes	%
Labour	Graham Robertson *	1,369	51.9
Labour	Judy Patterson *	1,334	
Conservative	Barbara Moore	663	25.1
Conservative	Aldred Seville	649	
Liberal Democrats	John Hassell	499	18.9
Liberal Democrats	Myer Chalmers	459	
Socialist	Paul Moorhouse	109	4.1
Majority		706	26.7
Rejected ballots		6	0.2
Turnout		2,614	29.1
Registered electors		8,971	
Labour win (new boundaries)			
Labour win (new boundaries)			

=== Horfield ===
Horfield
Party	Candidate	Votes	%
Conservative	Martin Kerry *	1,449	44.0
Conservative	Alan Bailey	1,386	
Labour	Kathleen Walker *	1,254	38.1
Labour	Nichola Barton	1,196	
Liberal Democrats	Andrew Ludlow	450	13.7
Liberal Democrats	Simon Young	432	
Green	Christopher Sykes	137	4.2
Majority		195	5.9
Rejected ballots		2	0.1
Turnout		3,188	36.7
Registered electors		8,698	
Conservative win (new boundaries)			
Conservative win (new boundaries)			

=== Kingsweston ===
Kingsweston
Party	Candidate	Votes	%
Labour	John Bees *	1,158	40.1
Labour	John Waines	889	
Liberal Democrats	Terence Thomas	860	29.8
Conservative	Richard Clifton	754	26.1
Conservative	Douglas Dowling	724	
Liberal Democrats	Sylvia Young	638	
Green	David Woodgate	113	3.9
Majority		298	10.3
Rejected ballots		1	0.0
Turnout		2,641	35.3
Registered electors		7,487	
Labour win (new boundaries)			
Labour win (new boundaries)			

=== Knowle ===
Knowle
Party	Candidate	Votes	%
Labour	Jane Painter	1,198	38.3
Labour	Tessa Coombes *	1,162	
Liberal Democrats	David Traube	806	25.7
Conservative	John Stephenson	682	21.8
Liberal Democrats	Alexander Oliver	547	
Green	Glenn Vowles	352	11.2
Socialist	Domenico Hill	93	3.0
Majority		392	12.5
Rejected ballots		6	0.2
Turnout		2,625	31.9
Registered electors		8,236	
Labour win (new boundaries)			
Labour win (new boundaries)			

=== Lawrence Hill ===
Lawrence Hill
Party	Candidate	Votes	%
Labour	John Channon *	1,085	43.9
Labour	Brenda Hugill *	1,007	
Liberal Democrats	John Astley	917	37.1
Liberal Democrats	Stella Hender	793	
Conservative	Mary Brewer	187	7.6
Conservative	Diane Newton	171	
Green	Joanna Baker	145	5.9
Socialist Labour	David White	138	5.6
Socialist Labour	Paul Williams	131	
Majority		168	6.8
Rejected ballots		5	0.2
Turnout		2,370	27.5
Registered electors		8,626	
Labour win (new boundaries)			
Labour win (new boundaries)			

=== Lockleaze ===
Lockleaze
Party	Candidate	Votes	%
Labour	Paul Garland *	1,227	48.8
Labour	Arthur Massey	1,147	
Liberal Democrats	Joan Grace	594	23.6
Conservative	Lewes Price	534	21.3
Liberal Democrats	Ian Parry	526	
Green	Samantha Thompson	157	6.3
Majority		633	25.2
Rejected ballots		3	0.1
Turnout		2,235	28.4
Registered electors		7,879	
Labour win (new boundaries)			
Labour win (new boundaries)			

=== Redland ===
Redland
Party	Candidate	Votes	%
Liberal Democrats	Sylvia Townsend	1,148	32.0
Liberal Democrats	James White	1,054	
Labour	Shelley Lanchbury	1,022	28.5
Labour	Elaine Bennett	1,021	
Conservative	Alastair Watson	977	27.2
Conservative	Susan Fleming	975	
Green	Justin Quinnell	443	12.3
Green	John Devaney	294	
Majority		126	3.5
Rejected ballots		2	0.1
Turnout		3,483	41.2
Registered electors		8,450	
Liberal Democrats win (new boundaries)			
Liberal Democrats win (new boundaries)			

=== Southmead ===
Southmead
Party	Candidate	Votes	%
Labour	Jenny Smith	1,063	56.1
Labour	Peter Hammond	1,020	
Conservative	Anthony Orr	390	20.6
Liberal Democrats	Carol Knight	370	19.5
Liberal Democrats	Martyn Dunn	364	
Socialist Labour	Vincent Horrigan	72	3.8
Majority		673	35.5
Rejected ballots		3	0.2
Turnout		1,766	23.1
Registered electors		7,641	
Labour win (new boundaries)			
Labour win (new boundaries)			

=== Southville ===
Southville
Party	Candidate	Votes	%
Labour	Rosemary Brennan *	1,481	52.3
Labour	Andrew May *	1,433	
Conservative	Cora Stephenson	483	17.1
Liberal Democrats	Jonathan Freeman	459	16.2
Conservative	Ian Millard	443	
Green	Charles Bolton	340	12.0
Liberal Democrats	Melanie Worman	283	
Socialist	Roger Thomas	68	2.4
Majority		998	35.3
Rejected ballots		5	0.2
Turnout		2,622	31.8
Registered electors		8,242	
Labour win (new boundaries)			
Labour win (new boundaries)			

=== St George East ===
St George East
Party	Candidate	Votes	%
Labour	Margaret Shovelton *	1,280	52.3
Labour	Charles Price *	1,270	
Conservative	Jennifer Rogers	674	27.5
Conservative	Rachael Frise	665	
Liberal Democrats	Gordon Draper	495	20.2
Liberal Democrats	Tony Potts	377	
Majority		606	24.7
Rejected ballots		8	0.3
Turnout		2,419	27.5
Registered electors		8,796	
Labour win (new boundaries)			
Labour win (new boundaries)			

=== St George West ===
St George West
Party	Candidate	Votes	%
Labour	John Deasy *	1,296	60.0
Labour	Ronald Stone *	1,252	
Liberal Democrats	Michael Peacock	481	22.3
Liberal Democrats	Gordon Williams	458	
Conservative	Charles Alexander	383	17.7
Conservative	Paul Place	337	
Majority		815	37.7
Rejected ballots		7	0.3
Turnout		2,148	27.2
Registered electors		7,903	
Labour win (new boundaries)			
Labour win (new boundaries)			

=== Stockwood ===
Stockwood
Party	Candidate	Votes	%
Conservative	Jack Lopresti	1,638	46.1
Conservative	David Morris	1,608	
Labour	Graham Tanner	1,320	37.2
Labour	Jonathan Wyatt	1,244	
Liberal Democrats	Jane Collins	490	13.8
Liberal Democrats	Robert Johnston	431	
Green	Mary Thomson	105	3.0
Majority		318	9.0
Rejected ballots		2	0.1
Turnout		3,487	40.8
Registered electors		8,554	
Conservative win (new boundaries)			
Conservative win (new boundaries)			

=== Stoke Bishop ===
Stoke Bishop
Party	Candidate	Votes	%
Conservative	Christopher Alderson *	1,948	60.1
Conservative	Peter Abraham *	1,921	
Liberal Democrats	Vera Mackel	698	21.5
Liberal Democrats	Paul Smith	669	
Labour	Dianne Manning	415	12.8
Labour	Beverley Watkins	415	
Green	William McCaskie	181	5.6
Majority		1,250	38.6
Rejected ballots		3	0.1
Turnout		3,145	38.75
Registered electors		8,117	
Conservative win (new boundaries)			
Conservative win (new boundaries)			

=== Westbury-on-Trym ===
Westbury-on-Trym
Party	Candidate	Votes	%
Conservative	David Poole *	2,371	58.6
Conservative	Robert Wall *	2,265	
Liberal Democrats	Philippa Jones	740	18.3
Labour	Dick Drew	720	17.8
Liberal Democrats	Geraldine Box	680	
Labour	Susan Milestone	630	
Green	Christina Stockdale	213	5.3
Majority		1,631	40.3
Rejected ballots		3	0.1
Turnout		3,819	45.5
Registered electors		8,396	
Conservative win (new boundaries)			
Conservative win (new boundaries)			

=== Whitchurch Park ===
Whitchurch Park
Party	Candidate	Votes	%
Labour	Helen Holland *	1,340	58.1
Labour	David Johnson	1,225	
Liberal Democrats	Stephen Farthing	473	20.5
Liberal Democrats	Peter Burrows	362	
Conservative	Derek Frise	349	15.1
Green	David Coombes	143	6.2
Majority		867	37.6
Rejected ballots		0	0.0
Turnout		2,127	26.2
Registered electors		8,130	
Labour win (new boundaries)			
Labour win (new boundaries)			

=== Windmill Hill ===
Windmill Hill
Party	Candidate	Votes	%
Labour	Diane Bunyan *	1,526	52.8
Labour	Christopher Orlik *	1,273	
Green	Maxine Gilman	460	15.9
Conservative	Graham Morris	396	13.7
Liberal Democrats	Josephine Carpenter	358	12.4
Conservative	Robert Morris	343	
Liberal Democrats	James Carpenter	333	
Socialist	Stephen Luff	149	5.2
Majority		1,066	36.9
Rejected ballots		4	0.2
Turnout		2,472	28.0
Registered electors		8,834	
Labour win (new boundaries)			
Labour win (new boundaries)			
