= St George West =

Electoral ward in Bristol, England

Coordinates: 51.46719°N 2.54417°W

- ward Bristol City Council
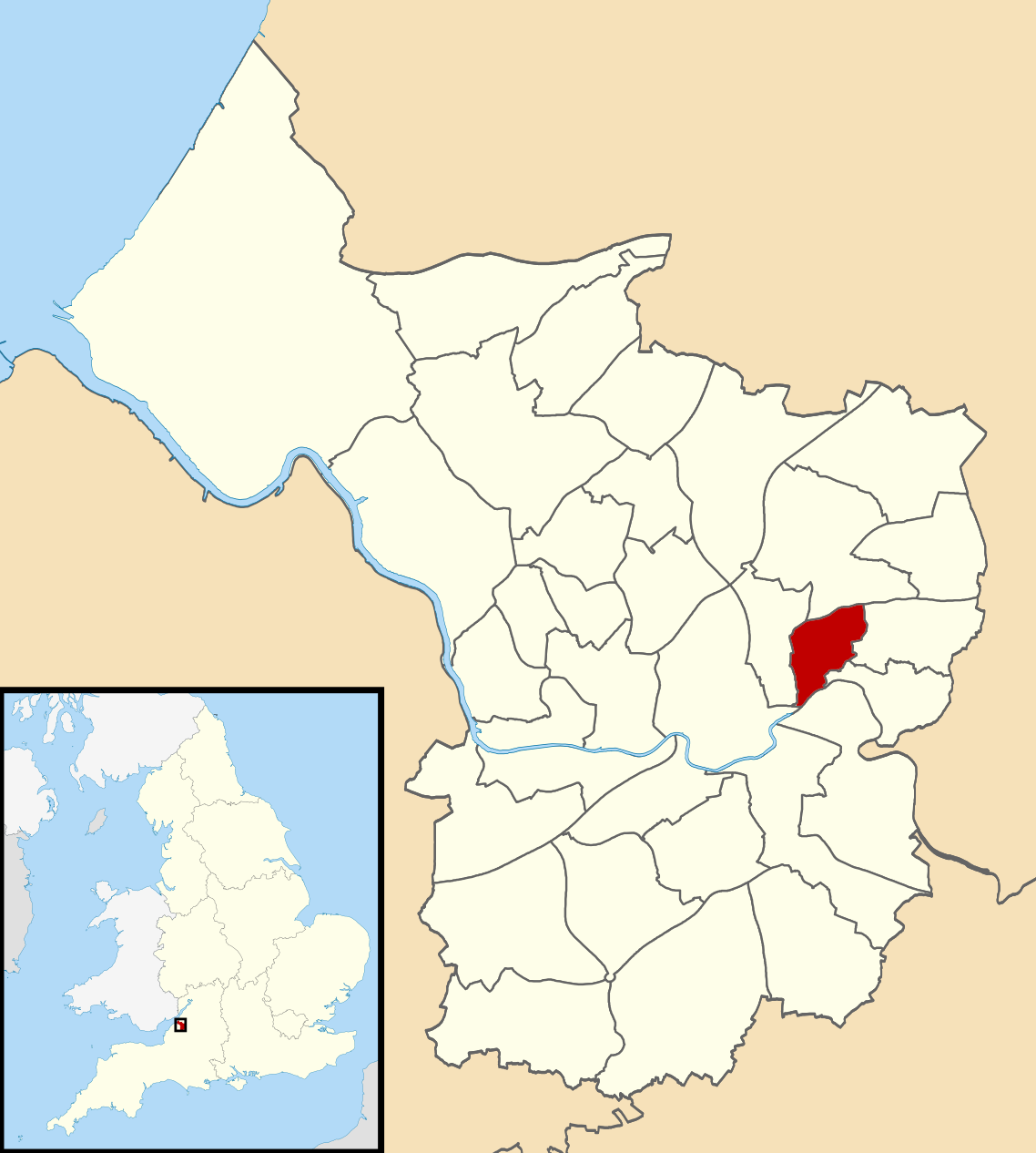
- Ward boundaries since 2016.
- County: Bristol
- Population: 6,891
- Electorate: 5,265

Current ward
- Councillor: Rob Bryher (Green)
- UK Parliament constituency: Bristol East

St George West is an electoral ward in the St George neighbourhood of Bristol, England. It is located in the outer east of the city of Bristol, covering St George Park, the upper end of Church Road (from the junction at Avonvale Road to just beyond the Fountain), Plummers Hill and parts of Crofts End to the north, down to the River Avon to the south, and includes part of Redfield in the south-west.

Boundaries for Bristol electoral wards were redrawn ahead of the 2016 United Kingdom local elections, following years of population growth. St George West reduced in area and became a single-councillor ward, with parts of the electorate transferring to St George Central and St George Troopers Hill to the east.

For elections to the Parliament of the United Kingdom, St George is in Bristol East constituency. As of 2024 the constituency is represented by Kerry McCarthy MP (Labour).

== Councillors ==
Councillors representing St George West ward
Elected	Councillor	Party	Electorate	Turnout
2024	Rob Bryher	Green	5,265	42%
2021	Asher Craig	Labour	5,204	44.66%
2016	Asher Craig	Labour	4,757	45.97%
2015	Sue Milestone	Labour	9,355	61.58%.
2014	Sue Milestone	Labour		
2013	Ron Stone	Labour		
2011	Peter Warren Hammond	Labour		
2009	Ron Stone	Labour		
2008 by election	Tony Potter	Lib Dem		
2007	John Edward Deasy	Labour		

== Local elections ==
The 1995 local election in St. George West was won by Ronald Edward Stone and John Edward Deasy, who were the Labour party candidates. In 1997, there was a 68.21% turnout for an election which was won by the Labour party. The Labour party has continued to win the local election in the ward, although in 2007 they achieved only 38.24% of the vote. This was less than 2% more than the Conservative Party candidate, who was in second place. In the 2008 by-election, after the death of the Labour candidate the Conservative party attracted some controversy after replacing their previous candidate, Angelo Agathangelou, with Colin Bretherton.

== Schools ==
There are five schools in the ward. This includes Air Balloon Hill Infant and Junior Schools, Air Balloon Hill Junior School, Speedwell Nursery School, St. Patrick's Catholic Primary School and Summerhill School.

Air Balloon Hill School can be found on Hillside Road. Speedwell Nursery School can be found on Speedwell Road and St. Patrick's Catholic Primary School is located on Blackswarth Road.
