= 2014 Bristol City Council election =

2014 UK local government election

← 2013	22 May 2014	2015 →

24 of 70 seats (One Third) to Bristol City Council 36 seats needed for a majority
	First party	Second party	Third party
Party	Labour	Liberal Democrats	Conservative
Seats won	31	16	15
Seat change	▲3	▼7	▲1
Popular vote	22,785	13,235	18,367
Percentage	28.91%	16.79%	23.31%
Swing	▼1.43%	▼4.06%	▼0.12%
	Fourth party	Fifth party	Sixth party
Party	Green	UKIP	Independent
Seats won	6	1	1
Seat change	▲2	▲1	Steady
Popular vote	12,375	8,874	1,385
Percentage	15.70%	11.26%	1.76%
Swing	▲1.94%	▲7.1%	▼4.12%
Council control before election
No Overall Control
Council control after election
No Overall Control

The 2014 Bristol City Council election took place on 22 May 2014 to elect members of Bristol City Council in England, as part of the United Kingdom 2014 Local Elections.

214,544 people were eligible to vote in the elections, of which 58,907 turned out to do so. Consequently, overall turnout was 27.5%.

2014 local election results in Bristol

== Ward results ==
Bristol Council composition following the 2014 local elections

=== Avonmouth ===
Bristol City Council Elections: Avonmouth Ward 2014
Party	Candidate	Votes	%	±%
Conservative	Matthew Simon Melias	1,067	31.55	−7.83
Labour	John Thomas Bees	1,051	30.88	+0.50
UKIP	Spud Murphy	878	25.79	+1.90
Green	Justin Michael Quinnell	149	4.38	+1.43
Independent	Stephen Kenneth James Norman	135	3.97	N/A
Liberal Democrats	Ian Humfrey Campion-Smith	108	3.17	+0.81
TUSC	Patrick Dorian Hulme	16	0.47	+8.53
Majority		16	0.67	−4.05
Conservative gain from Labour		Swing	-4.17	

=== Bedminster ===
Bristol City Council Elections: Bedminster Ward 2014
Party	Candidate	Votes	%	±%
Labour	Mark Bradshaw	1,745	46.77	+5.84
Green	Catherine Slade	838	22.46	+7.46
Conservative	Sarah Helen Cleave	680	18.23	+0.13
Liberal Democrats	Thom Oliver	264	7.08	−13.19
TUSC	Robin Victor Clapp	204	5.47	+2.45
Majority		907	24.31	+3.65
Labour hold		Swing	-0.81	

=== Bishopston ===
Bristol City Council Elections: Bishopston Ward 2014
Party	Candidate	Votes	%	±%
Green	Tim Malnick	2,246	47.31	+11.21
Labour	Eileen Means	1,168	24.61	+5.21
Liberal Democrats	Barry John Cash	757	15.95	−2.04
Conservative	Owen James Evans	511	10.76	+4.29
TUSC	Martin James Saddington	65	1.37	+0.45
Majority		1,078	22.70	+6.00
Green gain from Liberal Democrats		Swing	+3.00	

=== Bishopsworth ===
Bristol City Council Elections: Bishopsworth Ward 2014
Party	Candidate	Votes	%	±%
Conservative	Kevin Michael Quartley	1,058	39.45	−12.07
Labour	Kye Daniel Dudd	783	29.19	−6.93
Independents for Bristol	Jon Craig	431	16.07	N/A
Green	Alan Wilson Baker	230	8.58	−0.37
Liberal Democrats	Gareth Owen	92	3.43	+0.03
TUSC	Joseph John Etherington	88	3.28	N/A
Majority		275	10.26	−5.14
Conservative hold		Swing	-2.57	

=== Brislington East ===
Bristol City Council Elections: Brislington East Ward 2014
Party	Candidate	Votes	%	±%
Labour	Mike Willacott	1,002	31.85	−7.61
UKIP	John Langley	886	28.16	+21.94
Conservative	Perry Hicks	645	20.50	−14.42
Green	Peter Antony Goodwin	241	7.66	−0.04
Liberal Democrats	Pauline Mary Allen	199	6.33	−4.34
Independent	Philip Collins	138	4.39	N/A
TUSC	Matthew Gordon	35	1.11	+0.08
Majority		116	3.69	−0.85
Labour hold		Swing	-14.78	

=== Brislington West ===
Bristol City Council Elections: Brislington West Ward 2014
Party	Candidate	Votes	%	±%
Labour	Rhian Elena Greaves	972	30.87	+0.12
UKIP	Christopher James Robinson	813	25.82	+16.15
Liberal Democrats	Peter Henry Main	800	25.40	−6.94
Conservative	Roy Towler	501	15.91	−3.18
TUSC	Ibado Ali Mahamoud	63	2.00	+0.96
Majority		159	5.05	+3.46
Labour gain from Liberal Democrats		Swing	-8.02	

=== Filwood ===
Bristol City Council Elections: Filwood Ward 2014
Party	Candidate	Votes	%	±%
Labour	Christopher David Jackson	1,334	59.39	−4.45
Green	Ryan Brinkley	335	14.92	+10.00
Conservative	Sylvia Christine Windows	301	13.40	−0.45
TUSC	Marion Jackson	174	7.75	+6.15
Liberal Democrats	Crispin Allard	102	4.54	−1.62
Majority		999	44.47	−5.19
Labour hold		Swing	-7.23	

=== Harcliffe ===
Bristol City Council Elections: Harcliffe Ward 2014
Party	Candidate	Votes	%	±%
Labour	Naomi Grace Rylatt	1,031	44.69	−11.11
Conservative	Jonathan Robert Hucker	648	28.09	+4.21
Green	Patrick Charles Gordon Slade	283	12.27	+7.58
TUSC	Robert Nash	223	9.67	N/A
Liberal Democrats	Paul Elvin	122	5.29	−0.22
Majority		383	16.60	−0.22
Labour hold		Swing	-7.66	

=== Henbury ===
Bristol City Council Elections: Henbury Ward 2014
Party	Candidate	Votes	%	±%
Conservative	Mark Weston	1,491	52.02	+4.29
Labour	Rosalie Walker	907	31.65	−7.54
Green	Ruby Tucker	236	8.23	+2.70
Liberal Democrats	Thomas Stephens	139	4.85	−1.46
TUSC	David Rawlings	93	3.24	N/A
Majority		584	20.37	+11.83
Conservative hold		Swing	+5.92	

=== Hengrove ===
Bristol City Council Elections: Hengrove Ward 2014
Party	Candidate	Votes	%	±%
UKIP	Michael Frost	912	31.02	N/A
Labour	Yvonne Eileen Clapp	780	26.53	−11.02
Conservative	Antony Skelding	503	17.11	−11.38
Liberal Democrats	Sylvia Kathleen Doubell	480	16.33	−9.73
Green	Graham Hugh Davey	123	4.18	+1.61
Respect	Neil Oliver Maggs	114	3.88	N/A
TUSC	Mark Baker	28	0.95	N/A
Majority		132	4.49	−4.57
UKIP gain from Liberal Democrats		Swing	+21.02	

=== Henleaze ===
Bristol City Council Elections: Henleaze Ward 2014
Party	Candidate	Votes	%	±%
Liberal Democrats	Clare Campion-Smith	1,830	43.73	−0.76
Conservative	Kevin Michael Staples	1,289	30.80	−4.73
Labour	Barry Thompson Trahar	488	11.66	−0.87
Green	Geoff Collard	307	7.34	−0.11
UKIP	Nina Beale	246	5.88	N/A
TUSC	Chris Farrell	25	0.60	N/A
Majority		541	12.93	+3.97
Liberal Democrats hold		Swing	+1.99	

=== Horfield ===
Bristol City Council Elections: Horfield Ward 2014
Party	Candidate	Votes	%	±%
Labour	Olly Mead	1,032	27.63	+0.54
Conservative	Nigel John Currie	958	25.65	−2.92
Liberal Democrats	Cheryl Ann	699	18.71	−4.23
UKIP	Peter Charles Brown	520	13.92	N/A
Green	John Mark Hills	474	12.69	+3.30
TUSC	Martyn Ahmet	52	1.39	+0.00
Majority		74	1.39	+0.99
Labour gain from Liberal Democrats		Swing	+1.73	

=== Kingsweston ===
Bristol City Council Elections: Kingsweston Ward 2014
Party	Candidate	Votes	%	±%
Liberal Democrats	Tim Leaman	745	26.37	+3.17
UKIP	Terence Richard Daniel Thomas	720	25.49	N/A
Labour	Mike Thorne	654	23.15	−2.85
Conservative	Barbara Madeleine Lewis	489	17.31	−0.68
Green	Ben Appleby	195	6.90	+3.47
TUSC	Caroline Louisa Vincent	22	0.78	−1.00
Majority		25	0.88	−0.72
Liberal Democrats hold		Swing	-11.16	

=== Knowle ===
Bristol City Council Elections: Knowle Ward 2014
Party	Candidate	Votes	%	±%
Liberal Democrats	Gary Hopkins	1,659	45.92	+6.78
Labour	Christopher Louis Orlik	884	24.47	−9.05
UKIP	Steve Wood	477	13.20	N/A
Green	Stephen Petter	311	8.61	−1.92
Conservative	Graham David Morris	239	6.62	−7.98
TUSC	Domenico William Hill	43	1.19	−1.03
Majority		775	21.45	+15.83
Liberal Democrats hold		Swing	+7.92	

=== Lockleaze ===
Bristol City Council Elections: Lockleaze Ward 2014
Party	Candidate	Votes	%	±%
Labour	Gill Kirk	1,071	37.79	−8.61
Liberal Democrats	Sean Clifford Emmett	719	25.37	−4.79
UKIP	Pearleta Chicketer Hopkins	452	15.95	N/A
Green	Chrissie Quinnell	309	10.90	−0.12
Conservative	Darien Luke Jay	242	8.54	−3.88
TUSC	Roger Thomas	41	1.45	N/A
Majority		352	12.42	−3.82
Labour gain from Liberal Democrats		Swing	-1.91	

=== Redland ===
Bristol City Council Elections: Redland Ward 2014
Party	Candidate	Votes	%	±%
Green	Martin Fodor	1,465	36.19	+14.21
Liberal Democrats	Alex Smethurst	709	17.51	−15.31
Labour	Philip John Jardine	689	17.02	−2.91
Conservative	Christopher Morton	661	16.33	−0.36
Independents for Bristol	Stella Jane Perrett	327	8.08	N/A
UKIP	Christine Wyndham-Thomas	171	4.22	N/A
TUSC	Laura Collins	26	0.64	−0.48
Majority		756	18.68	+7.84
Green gain from Liberal Democrats		Swing	+14.76	

=== Southmead ===
Bristol City Council Elections: Southmead Ward 2014
Party	Candidate	Votes	%	±%
Labour	Jenny Smith	1,121	44.22	−17.05
UKIP	Tony Orr	633	24.97	N/A
Conservative	Paige Cora Betty Elise Golding	458	18.07	−1.14
Green	Chris Millman	160	6.31	−2.79
Liberal Democrats	Andrew John Morgan	145	5.72	−0.57
TUSC	John Yeandle	18	0.71	−3.43
Majority		488	19.25	−22.81
Labour hold		Swing	-21.01	

=== Southville ===
Bristol City Council Elections: Southville Ward 2014
Party	Candidate	Votes	%	±%
Green	Charlie Bolton	1,700	42.53	+4.86
Labour	Celia Christine Phipps	1,322	33.07	−10.27
UKIP	Paul Anthony Turner	402	10.06	N/A
Conservative	James Andrew Hale Stevenson	289	7.23	−4.42
Liberal Democrats	Lena Clare Wright	208	5.20	−2.13
TUSC	Matthew Edward Carey	76	1.90	N/A
Majority		378	9.46	−4.98
Green hold		Swing	+7.57	

=== St George West ===
Bristol City Council Elections: St George West Ward 2014
Party	Candidate	Votes	%	±%
Labour	Sue Milestone	1,141	39.43	−7.28
Green	Chloe Alice Somers	494	17.07	+9.34
Conservative	David Thomas Harrison Lewis	425	14.69	+7.23
Liberal Democrats	Tony Potter	387	13.37	+0.76
Independents for Bristol	Jane Marjory Westhead	354	12.23	N/A
TUSC	Tom Boyd	93	3.21	+0.81
Majority		647	22.36	−1.26
Labour hold		Swing	-8.31	

=== Stockwood ===
Bristol City Council Elections: Stockwood Ward 2014
Party	Candidate	Votes	%	±%
Conservative	David Henry Robert Morris	1,336	47.65	+0.55
Labour	Kerry Barker	855	30.49	+0.52
Green	Issica Carina Baron	337	12.02	+1.58
Liberal Democrats	Robin Max McGhee	150	5.35	−7.14
TUSC	Philip John Bishop	126	4.49	N/A
Majority		481	17.16	+0.03
Conservative hold		Swing	+0.02	

=== Stoke Bishop ===
Bristol City Council Elections: Stoke Bishop Ward 2014
Party	Candidate	Votes	%	±%
Conservative	John Goulandris	2,142	57.77	−10.62
Green	Kyla Darrell	513	13.83	+5.34
Labour	Christine Webb	468	12.62	+0.44
Liberal Democrats	Mary Elizabeth Page	330	8.90	−2.05
UKIP	Gerard Robinson	230	6.20	N/A
TUSC	Michael Wright	25	0.67	N/A
Majority		1,629	43.94	−12.27
Conservative hold		Swing	-7.98	

=== Westbury-on-Trym ===
Bristol City Council Elections: Westbury-on-Trym Ward 2014
Party	Candidate	Votes	%	±%
Conservative	Alastair Peter Lindsay Watson	1,977	49.82	−1.18
Labour	Jonathan David Moore	568	14.31	+1.90
Liberal Democrats	Graham Christopher Donald	530	13.36	+4.87
UKIP	Ann Kathleen Michael	442	11.14	N/A
Green	Alex Dunn	427	10.76	+6.08
TUSC	Mike Luff	24	0.60	N/A
Majority		1,409	35.51	+7.93
Conservative hold		Swing	+0.36	

=== Whitchurch Park ===
Bristol City Council Elections: Whitchurch Park Ward 2014
Party	Candidate	Votes	%	±%
Liberal Democrats	Tim Kent	961	36.61	+12.50
UKIP	Christine Ann Forrester	742	28.27	N/A
Labour	Alice Drummond Boquet	612	23.31	−28.28
Conservative	Jenny Rogers	210	8.00	−7.74
Green	Barney Smith	82	3.12	−0.03
TUSC	Frankie Langeland	18	0.69	N/A
Majority		219	8.34	−19.17
Liberal Democrats hold		Swing	-7.89	

=== Windmill Hill ===
Bristol City Council Elections: Windmill Hill Ward 2014
Party	Candidate	Votes	%	±%
Labour	Sam Mongon	1,107	28.99	+3.07
Liberal Democrats	Andrew Charles Brown	1,100	28.81	−21.74
Green	Pip Sheard	920	24.10	+10.07
UKIP	Al Shute	350	9.17	N/A
Conservative	Tony Lee	247	6.47	+0.38
TUSC	Tom Baldwin	94	2.46	−0.95
Majority		7	0.18	−24.45
Labour gain from Liberal Democrats		Swing	+12.41	
