= St George Central =

Electoral ward in Bristol, England

Coordinates: 51.4623°N 2.5279°W

- ward Bristol City Council
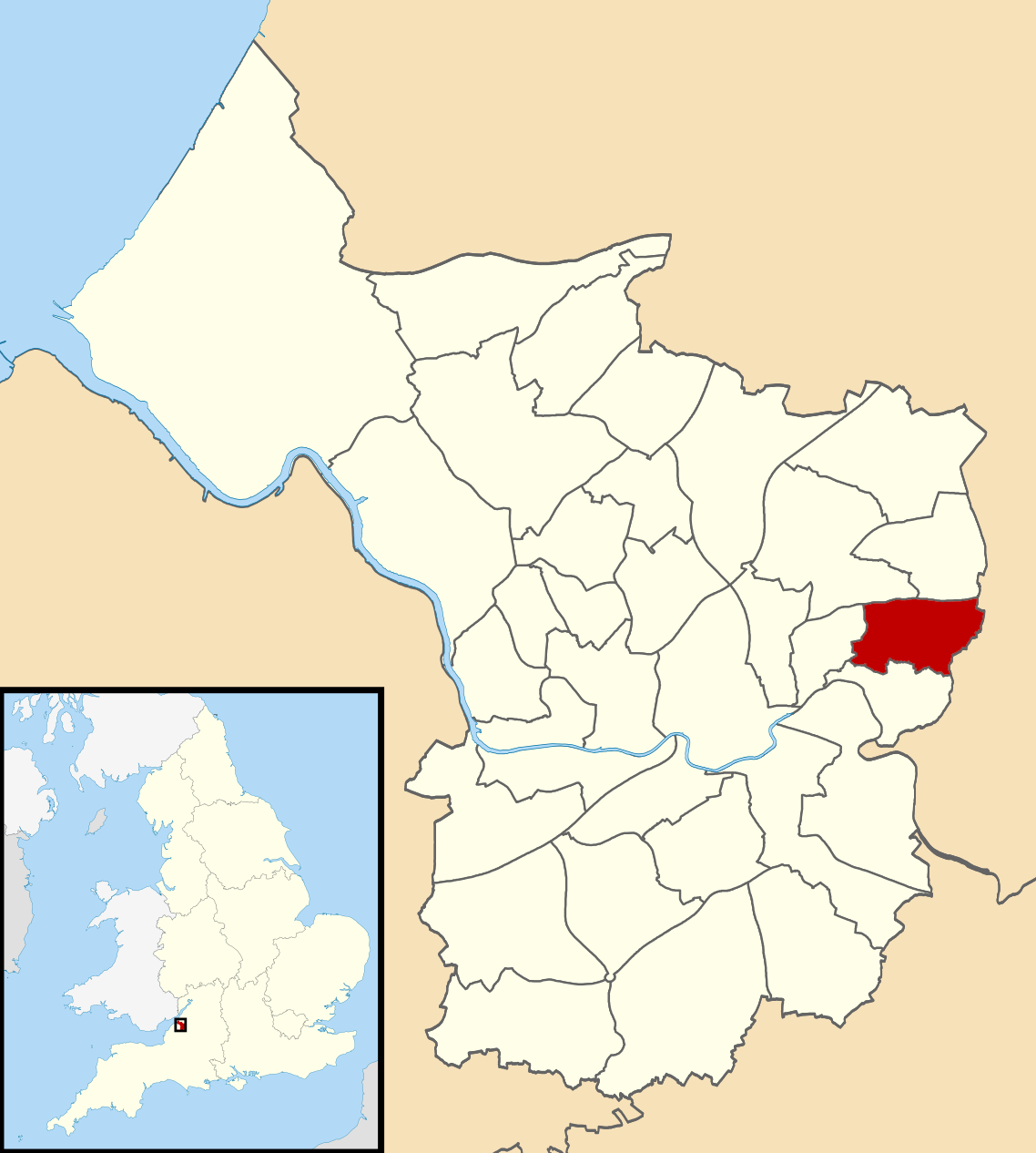
- Ward boundaries since 2016.
- County: Bristol
- Population: 12,984
- Electorate: 9,913

Current ward
- Created: 2016
- Councillor: Abi Finch (Greens)
- Councillor: Cara Lavan (Greens)
- Created from: St George East, St George West
- UK Parliament constituency: Bristol East

St George Central is an electoral ward in Bristol, England, covering parts of the St George neighbourhood in the east of the city. It is represented by two members on Bristol City Council, which as of 2024 are Abi Finch and Cara Lavan of the Green Party of England and Wales.

St George Central ward was created ahead of the 2016 United Kingdom local elections, following a boundary review by the Local Government Boundary Commission for England. It was created from the northern half of the former St George East ward, and a small eastern part of St George West

== Area profile ==
The ward includes central and eastern parts of St George, centred on the A420 road (Bell Hill Road and Two Mile Hill Road). The north of the ward includes parts of Speedwell neighbourhood. The ward is on the eastern boundary of Bristol unitary authority, adjacent to Kingswood, which is part of the contiguous Bristol Built-up Area but outside of the unitary authority. Eastern parts of the ward are close to Kingswood High Street, and are therefore often considered to be part of an informally defined Kingswood neighbourhood that straddles official boundaries.

For elections to the Parliament of the United Kingdom, St George Central is in Bristol East constituency.

== Local elections ==
=== 2024 election ===
St George Central (2 seats)
| Party | Candidate | Votes | % | ±% |
|---|---|---|---|---|
| Green | Abi Finch | 1,726 | 52.56 | +28.53 |
| Green | Cara Lavan | 1,496 | 45.55 | +33.39 |
| Labour | Sally Bowman | 1,246 | 37.94 | −11.35 |
| Labour | Henry Palmer | 1,041 | 31.70 | +2.41 |
| Conservative | James Hinchcliffe | 283 | 8.62 | −11.71 |
| Conservative | Justyna Hinchcliffe | 248 | 7.55 | −12.35 |
| Liberal Democrats | Alistair Kirtley | 78 | 2.38 | −5.86 |
| TUSC | Kristopher Barker | 70 | 2.13 | +2.13 |
| Liberal Democrats | Brian Price | 57 | 1.74 | −2.82 |
| Turnout | | 3,284 | 31.56 | −2.76 |
| Green gain from Labour | | | | |
| Green gain from Labour | | | | |

=== 2021 election ===
St George Central (2 seats)
| Party | Candidate | Votes | % | ±% |
|---|---|---|---|---|
| Labour | Nicola Anne Beech | 1,676 | 49.29 | −4.87 |
| Labour | Steve Pearce | 996 | 29.29 | −5.95 |
| Green | Georgia Nelson | 817 | 24.03 | +9.31 |
| Conservative | Anthony Paul Lee | 691 | 20.32 | +1.75 |
| Conservative | Laura Saunders | 682 | 20.06 | +1.81 |
| Green | Patrick John Toland | 417 | 12.26 | +12.26 |
| Liberal Democrats | Chris Featonby | 280 | 8.24 | −1.75 |
| Liberal Democrats | Tina Kaulbach | 155 | 4.56 | −4.75 |
| Turnout | | 3,400 | 34.32 | −2.03 |
| Labour hold | | | | |
| Labour hold | | | | |

=== 2016 election ===
St George Central (2 seats)
| Party | Candidate | Votes | % | ±% |
|---|---|---|---|---|
| Labour | Nicola Anne Beech | 1,855 | 54.16 | |
| Labour | Steve Pearce | 1,207 | 35.24 | |
| Conservative | Tony Lee | 636 | 18.57 | |
| Conservative | Kris Murphy | 625 | 18.25 | |
| Green | Ruby Alice Gabrielle Tucker | 504 | 14.72 | |
| Liberal Democrats | Andy Crow | 342 | 9.99 | |
| Liberal Democrats | Jillian Anita Gettrup | 319 | 9.31 | |
| TUSC | Wayne Jefferson Coombes | 201 | 5.87 | |
| Turnout | | 3,425 | 36.35 | |
| Labour win (new seat) | | | | |
| Labour win (new seat) | | | | |
