= Hengrove and Whitchurch Park =

Electoral ward in Bristol, England

Coordinates: 51.4160°N 2.5918°W

- ward Bristol City Council
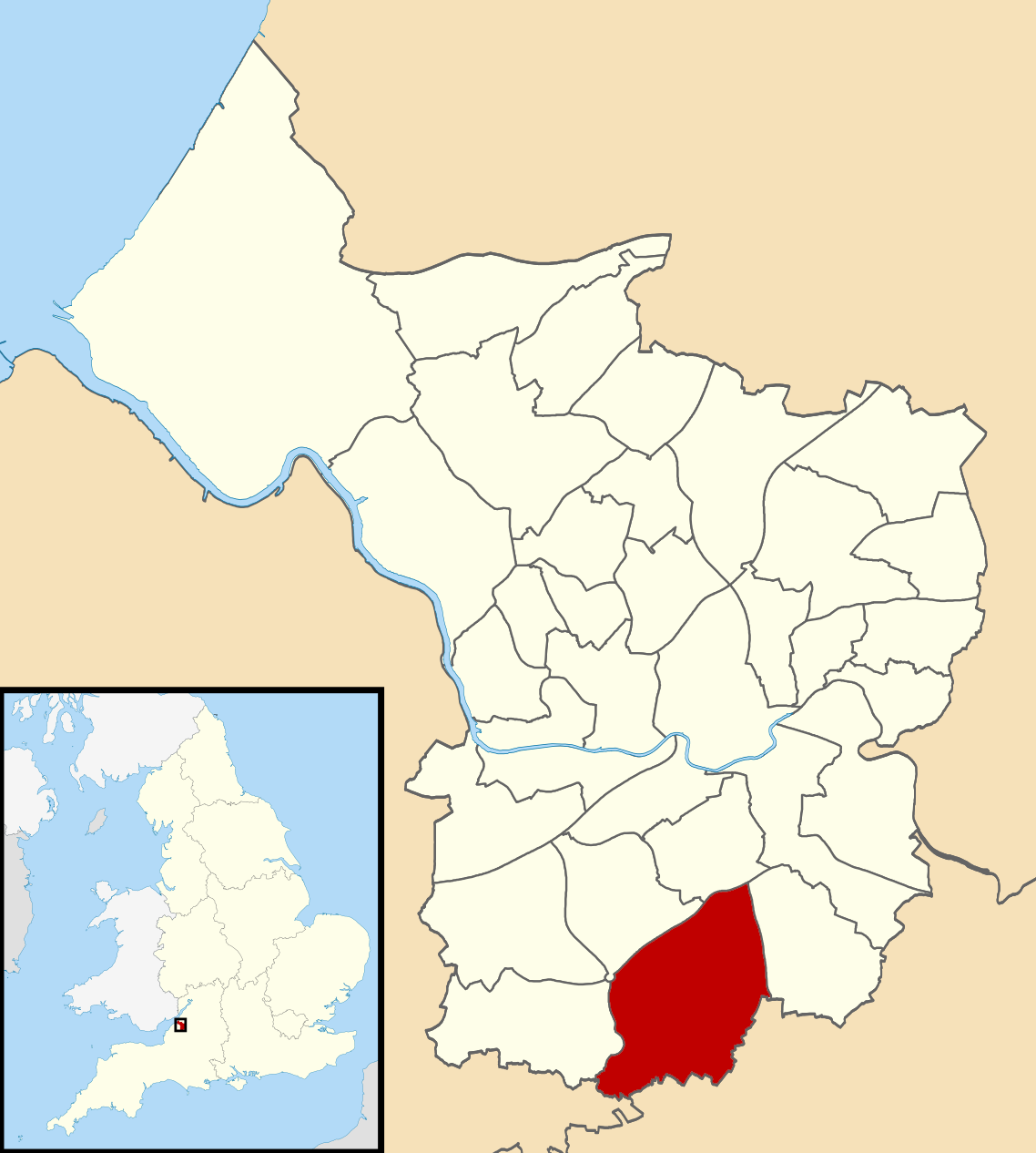
- Ward boundaries since 2016.
- County: Bristol
- Population: 18,711
- Electorate: 14,789

Current ward
- Created: 2016
- Councillor: Tim Kent (Liberal Democrats)
- Councillor: Andrew Brown (Liberal Democrats)
- Councillor: Sarah Classick (Liberal Democrats)
- UK Parliament constituency: Bristol South

Hengrove and Whitchurch Park is an electoral ward in Bristol, England. It has 3 Liberal Democrat councillors, Andrew Brown and Sarah Classick since 2021, and Tim Kent since 2016.

== Area Profile ==
For elections to the Parliament of the United Kingdom, Hengrove and Whitchurch Park is in Bristol South constituency.
