= St George Troopers Hill =

Electoral ward in Bristol, England

Coordinates: 51.4571°N 2.5363°W

- ward Bristol City Council
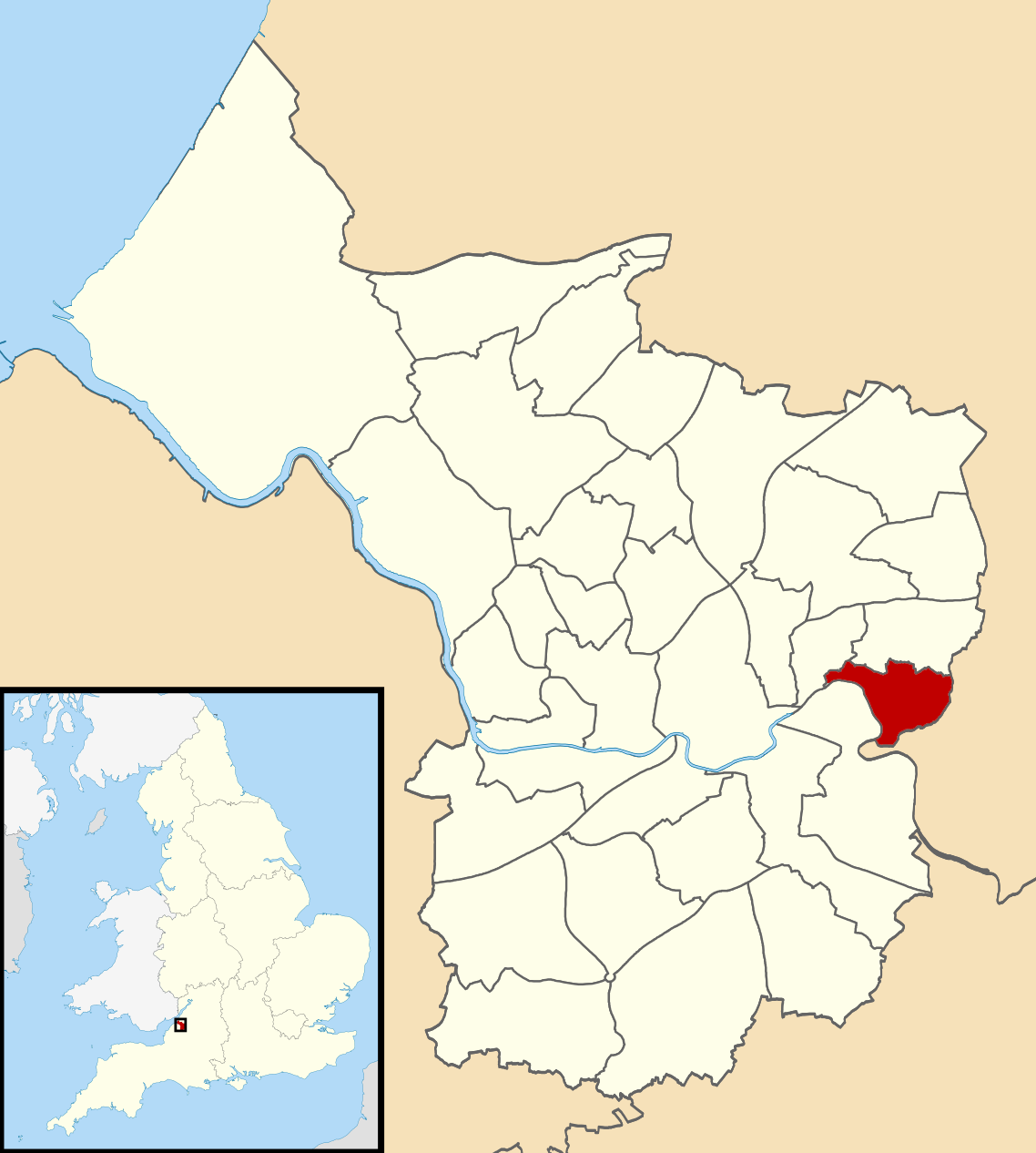
- Ward boundaries since 2016.
- County: Bristol
- Population: 6,459
- Electorate: 4,663

Current ward
- Created: 2016
- Councillor: Fabian Breckels (Labour)
- Created from: St George East
- UK Parliament constituency: Bristol East

St George Troopers Hill is an electoral ward in Bristol, England.

== Area Profile ==
For elections to the Parliament of the United Kingdom, St George Troopers Hill is in Bristol East constituency.
