= 2015 Bristol City Council election =

2015 UK local government election

← 2014	7 May 2015	2016 →

24 of 70 seats (One Third) to Bristol City Council 36 seats needed for a majority
	First party	Second party	Third party
Party	Labour	Conservative	Green
Seats won	30	16	13
Seat change	▼1	▲1	▲7
Popular vote	45,535	31,376	36,503
Percentage	30.77%	21.20%	24.67%
Swing	▲1.86%	▼2.11%	▲8.97%
	Fourth party	Fifth party	Sixth party
Party	Liberal Democrats	UKIP	Independent
Seats won	10	1	0
Seat change	▼6	Steady	▼1
Popular vote	19,328	12,585	608
Percentage	13.06%	8.50%	0.41%
Swing	▼3.73%	▼2.76%	▼1.35%
Council control before election
No Overall Control
Council control after election
No Overall Control

The 2015 Bristol City Council election took place on 7 May 2015 to elect members of Bristol City Council in England. This was on the same day as other local elections.

In March 2015, the only Independent Councillor on Bristol City Council joined the Conservatives. This meant that the Conservatives increased their number of seats from the previous Council despite making no gains in the May election.

== Ward results ==
2015 local election results in Bristol

Bristol City Council composition following the 2015 local electionl

=== Ashley ===
Bristol City Council Elections: Ashley Ward 2015
Party	Candidate	Votes	%	±%
Green	Gus Hoyt	4,470	51.48	+16.94
Labour	Mary Southcott	2,480	28.56	–1.26
Liberal Democrats	Nura Aabe	1,085	12.50	–15.97
Conservative	Owen James Evans	514	5.92	+3.07
TUSC	Ian Chard	134	1.54	+0.16
Majority		1990	22.92	+18.2
Green hold		Swing	+9.1	

=== Bedminster ===
Bristol City Council Elections: Bedminster Ward 2015
Party	Candidate	Votes	%	±%
Labour	Celia Christine Phipps	2,425	33.96	–12.81
Green	Alan Wilson Baker	2161	30.27	+7.81
Conservative	Darien Luke Jay	1,715	24.02	+5.79
Liberal Democrats	Peter Henry Main	606	8.49	+1.41
TUSC	Robin Clapp	233	3.26	–2.21
Majority		264	3.69	−20.62
Labour hold		Swing	–10.31	

=== Bishopsworth ===
Bristol City Council Elections: Bishopsworth Ward 2015
Party	Candidate	Votes	%	±%
Conservative	Richard Stephen Eddy	2,412	47.57	+8.12
Labour	Paul Goggin	1,777	35.05	+5.86
Green	Pip Sheard	497	9.8	+1.22
Liberal Democrats	Gareth John David Owen	238	4.69	+1.26
TUSC	David Rawlings	146	2.88	–0.4
Majority		635	12.52	+2.26
Conservative hold		Swing	+1.13	

=== Brislington East ===
Bristol City Council Elections: Brislington East Ward 2015
Party	Candidate	Votes	%	±%
Labour Co-op	Mike Langley	1,806	31.29	–0.56
Conservative	Perry Hicks	1,788	30.98	+10.48
UKIP	Simon Rodgers	1,071	18.56	–9.6
Green	Rachel Susannah Reed	737	12.77	+5.11
Liberal Democrats	Pauline Mary Allen	316	5.47	–0.86
TUSC	Andy Pryor	54	0.94	–0.17
Majority		18	0.31	−3.38
Labour hold		Swing	–5.52	

=== Brislington West ===
Bristol City Council Elections: Brislington West Ward 2015
Party	Candidate	Votes	%	±%
Labour	Eileen Means	1,582	26.39	–4.48
Liberal Democrats	Jos Clark	1366	22.79	–2.61
Conservative	James Charles Hinchcliffe	1,241	20.70	+4.79
UKIP	Christopher James Robinson	920	15.35	–10.47
Green	Natasha Kiran Clarke	836	13.94	N/A
TUSC	Louise Duncan	50	0.83	–1.17
Majority		261	3.6	–1.45
Labour gain from Liberal Democrats		Swing	–0.94	

=== Cabot ===
Bristol City Council Elections: Cabot Ward 2015
Party	Candidate	Votes	%	±%
Green	Ani Stafford-Townsend	2,916	38.47	+18.21
Labour	Kye Dudd	1,692	22.32	–3.47
Liberal Democrats	Alexander William Woodman	1,527	20.15	–20.46
Conservative	Will Luangrath	1,352	17.84	+4.49
TUSC	Chris Farrell	93	1.23	N/A
Majority		1224	16.15	+1.33
Green gain from Liberal Democrats		Swing	+10.84	

=== Clifton ===
Bristol City Council Elections: Clifton Ward 2015
Party	Candidate	Votes	%	±%
Green	Jerome Ungoed Thomas	2,170	32.75	+22.31
Conservative	Martin Joseph Wright	1856	28.01	+1.25
Liberal Democrats	Tom Stubbs	1,281	19.33	+0.08
Labour	John Halpin	963	14.53	+1.11
Independents for Bristol	Stephen Perry	314	4.74	–18.2
TUSC	Alfie Lethbridge	42	0.63	N/A
Majority		314	4.74	+0.92
Green gain from Liberal Democrats		Swing	+10.53	

=== Clifton East ===
Bristol City Council Elections: Clifton East Ward 2015
Party	Candidate	Votes	%	±%
Green	Carla Suzanne Denyer	1,945	32.16	+16.63
Conservative	Sarah Helen Cleave	1684	27.84	–5.81
Liberal Democrats	Christian Adam Martin	1,243	20.55	–14.13
Labour	Kerry Barker	1019	16.85	+0.72
Independents for Bristol	Christine Townsend	122	2.02	N/A
TUSC	Ian Quick	35	0.58	N/A
Majority		261	4.32	+3.29
Green gain from Liberal Democrats		Swing	+11.22	

=== Cotham ===
Bristol City Council Elections: Cotham Ward 2015
Party	Candidate	Votes	%	±%
Green	Dani Glazzard	3,174	42.90	+24.54
Liberal Democrats	Ian James Townsend	1,722	23.27	–18.1
Labour Co-op	Eileen Lepine	1,245	16.83	–7.9
Conservative	Thomas Seymour	1,203	16.26	+2.21
TUSC	Laura Collins	55	0.74	–0.75
Majority		1,452	19.63	+2.99
Green gain from Liberal Democrats		Swing	+21.32	

=== Easton ===
Bristol City Council Elections: Easton Ward 2015
Party	Candidate	Votes	%	±%
Green	Anna McMullen	3,117	47.21	+17.93
Labour	Carole Johnson	2140	32.41	–1.54
Liberal Democrats	Thom Oliver	590	8.94	–15.39
Conservative	Bador Uddin	471	7.13	+3.99
Independents for Bristol	Jane Westhead	172	2.60	–6.71
Left Unity	Philip Edward Pope	113	1.71	N/A
Majority		977	14.8	+10.13
Green gain from Labour		Swing	+9.74	

=== Eastville ===
Bristol City Council Elections: Eastville Ward 2015
Party	Candidate	Votes	%	±%
Labour	Mahmadur Khan	2,499	41.82	+2.32
Green	Simon Stafford-Townsend	1,260	21.08	+12.45
Conservative	Mike Williams	1156	19.34	+10.17
Liberal Democrats	Chris Harris	875	14.64	–24.82
TUSC	Mark Baker	186	3.11	–0.14
Majority		1239	20.74	+20.7
Labour hold		Swing	–5.07	

=== Filwood ===
Bristol City Council Elections: Filwood Ward 2015
Party	Candidate	Votes	%	±%
Labour	Jeff Lovell	1,980	47.30	–12.09
UKIP	Terence Richard Daniel Thomas	1031	24.63	N/A
Conservative	Sylvia Christine Windows	588	14.05	+0.65
Green	Stephen Petter	353	8.43	–6.49
Liberal Democrats	Crispin Toby John Allard	200	4.78	+0.24
TUSC	Tony Rowe	34	0.81	–6.94
Majority		949	22.67	−21.8
Labour hold		Swing	–18.36	

=== Frome Vale ===
Bristol City Council Elections: Frome Vale Ward 2015
Party	Candidate	Votes	%	±%
Conservative	Lesley Ann Alexander	1,991	35.47	+2.44
Labour	Erica Wildgoose	1803	32.12	–2.24
Green	Cath Thomas	759	13.52	+8.07
UKIP	Pamela Edwina Hyde	722	12.86	–8.84
Liberal Democrats	Graham Christopher Donald	276	4.92	+0.83
TUSC	Roger Thomas	62	1.10	
Majority		188	3.35	+2.02
Conservative hold		Swing	+2.34	

=== Hartcliffe ===
Bristol City Council Elections: Hartcliffe Ward 2015
Party	Candidate	Votes	%	±%
Labour	Mark Royston Brain	1,817	38.42	–6.27
Conservative	Jonathan Robert Hucker	1227	25.95	–2.14
UKIP	Anthony Michael Burrell Orr	1,122	23.73	N/A
Green	Ken Watt	283	5.98	–6.29
Liberal Democrats	Paul Elvin	241	5.10	–0.19
TUSC	Robert Nash	39	0.82	–8.85
Majority		590	12.47	–4.13
Labour hold		Swing	–2.07	

=== Hengrove ===
Bristol City Council Elections: Hengrove Ward 2015
Party	Candidate	Votes	%	±%
Labour	Barry David Clark	1,905	34.34	+7.81
Conservative	Antony Skelding	1490	26.86	+9.75
UKIP	Gerard Joseph Robinson	1,273	22.95	–8.07
Liberal Democrats	Sylvia Kathleen Doubell	603	10.87	–5.46
Green	Will Quick	244	4.40	+0.22
TUSC	Patrick Hulme	33	0.59	–0.36
Majority		415	7.48	+2.99
Labour hold		Swing	–0.97	

=== Hillfields ===
Bristol City Council Elections: Hillfields Ward 2015
Party	Candidate	Votes	%	±%
Labour	Craig Cheney	2,491	41.14	–11.83
Conservative	Roy Towler	1,336	22.06	+3.63
UKIP	Mervyn Roger Laxon	1,088	17.97	N/A
Green	Elsie Dragonfly Danann	672	11.10	–0.86
Liberal Democrats	Andy Morgan	382	6.31	–1.18
TUSC	Matt Gordon	86	1.42	–7.72
Majority		1155	19.08	–15.46
Labour hold		Swing	–7.73	

=== Knowle ===
Bristol City Council Elections: Knowle Ward 2015
Party	Candidate	Votes	%	±%
Liberal Democrats	Chris Davies	2,435	41.22	–4.7
Labour	Christopher Louis Orlik	1,499	25.37	+0.9
Green	Glenn Royston Vowles	722	12.22	+3.61
UKIP	Claire Lisa Louise Hayes	625	10.58	–2.62
Conservative	Anthony Paul Lee	590	9.99	+3.37
TUSC	Domenico Hill	37	0.63	–0.56
Majority		936	15.85	–5.6
Liberal Democrats hold		Swing	–2.8	

=== Lawrence Hill ===
Bristol City Council Elections: Lawrence Hill Ward 2015
Party	Candidate	Votes	%	±%
Labour	Margaret Hickman	3,123	46.15	–5.46
Green	Jude English	1,872	27.66	+19.44
Conservative	Ahmed Mohamed Duale	1,024	15.13	+10.33
Liberal Democrats	Christian Barrow	622	9.19	–1.69
TUSC	Giovanni Russo	126	1.86	–0.76
Majority		1251	18.49	–20.26
Labour hold		Swing	–12.45	

=== Southville ===
Bristol City Council Elections: Southville Ward 2015
Party	Candidate	Votes	%	±%
Green	Stephen Clarke	3,242	44.44	+1.91
Labour	Dwayne Leo Sinclair	2093	28.69	–4.38
Conservative	James Andrew Hale Stevenson	1,215	16.66	+9.43
Liberal Democrats	Lena Clare Wright	576	7.90	+2.7
TUSC	Matthew Carey	169	2.32	+0.42
Majority		1149	15.75	+6.29
Green gain from Labour		Swing	+3.15	

=== St George East ===
Bristol City Council Elections: St George East Ward 2015
Party	Candidate	Votes	%	±%
Labour	Fabian Guy Breckels	2,052	33.05	–16.97
Conservative	Kevin Robert Rainey	1,614	25.99	–1.49
UKIP	Jonathan Ralph Douglas Lewis	1566	25.22	N/A
Green	Rick Lovering	581	9.36	–1.68
Liberal Democrats	Nicholas John Coombes	333	5.36	–0.89
TUSC	Mike Luff	63	1.01	–4.2
Majority		438	7.06	–15.48
Labour hold		Swing	–7.74	

=== St George West ===
Bristol City Council Elections: St George West Ward 2015
Party	Candidate	Votes	%	±%
Labour	Sue Milestone	2,101	36.69	–2.74
Green	Matthew Whitney	1148	20.05	+2.98
Conservative	David Thomas Harrison Lewis	934	16.31	+1.62
UKIP	Claire Francesca Frost	901	15.73	N/A
Liberal Democrats	Tony Potter	557	9.73	–3.64
TUSC	Wayne Coombes	86	1.50	–1.71
Majority		953	16.64	–5.72
Labour hold		Swing	–2.86	

=== Stockwood ===
Bristol City Council Elections: Stockwood Ward 2015
Party	Candidate	Votes	%	±%
Conservative	Graham David Morris	2,145	39.19	–8.46
Labour	David John McLeod	1535	28.04	–2.45
UKIP	John Langley	1,144	20.90	N/A
Green	Eleanor Rosie Vowles	365	6.67	–5.35
Liberal Democrats	Ian Humfrey Campion-Smith	253	4.62	–0.73
TUSC	Phil Bishop	32	0.58	–3.91
Majority		610	11.15	–6.01
Conservative hold		Swing	–3.01	

=== Whitchurch Park ===
Bristol City Council Elections: Whitchurch Park Ward 2015
Party	Candidate	Votes	%	±%
Labour	Helen Holland	1,687	37.36	+14.05
UKIP	Daniel Matthew Fear	1,122	24.85	–3.42
Conservative	Jenny Rogers	985	21.82	+13.82
Liberal Democrats	Harriet Eva Clough	536	11.87	–24.74
Green	Peter Antony Goodwin	170	3.37	+0.25
TUSC	Frankie Langeland	15	0.33	–0.36
Majority		565	12.51	+4.17
Labour hold		Swing	+8.74	

=== Windmill Hill ===
Bristol City Council Elections: Windmill Hill Ward 2015
Party	Candidate	Votes	%	±%
Green	Deborah Mila Joffe	2,810	39.87	+15.77
Labour	Teresa Ann Stratford	1,821	25.84	–3.15
Liberal Democrats	Andrew Charles Brown	1,465	20.79	–8.02
Conservative	Barbara Madeleine Lewis	845	11.99	+5.52
TUSC	Tom Baldwin	107	1.52	–0.94
Majority		989	14.03	+13.85
Green gain from Liberal Democrats		Swing	+9.46	

== Council make up ==
After the 2015 local election, the political make up of the council was as follows:

Party	Number of councillors
Labour	30
Conservative	16
Green	14
Liberal Democrats	9
UKIP	1
