= 2013 Bristol City Council election =

2013 UK local government election

- 2 May 2013

23 of 70 seats (One Third) to Bristol City Council 36 seats needed for a majority
	First party	Second party	Third party
Party	Labour	Liberal Democrats	Conservative
Seats won	28	23	14
Seat change	▲7	▼10	Steady
Popular vote	17,755	12,203	13,712
Percentage	30.34%	20.85%	23.43%
Swing	▼5.45%	▼4.05%	▲2.52%
	Fourth party	Fifth party
Party	Green	Independent
Seats won	4	1
Seat change	▲2	▲1
Popular vote	8,055	3,443
Percentage	13.76%	5.88%
Swing	▼0.63%	▲5.35%
- Results by ward. Key: Conservative Labour Liberal Democrat Green Party of England and Wales Independents for Bristol No election in 2013
Council control before election
No Overall Control
Council control after election
No Overall Control

Elections for one third (23 seats) of Bristol City Council were held on 2 May 2013 as part of the 2013 United Kingdom local elections. (Note: All locally registered electors (British, Irish, Commonwealth and European Union citizens) who were aged 18 or over on Thursday 2 May 2013 were entitled to vote in the local elections. Those who were temporarily away from their ordinary address (for example, away working, on holiday, in student accommodation or in hospital) were also entitled to vote in the local elections, although those who had moved abroad and registered as overseas electors cannot vote in the local elections. It is possible to register to vote at more than one address (such as a university student who had a term-time address and lives at home during holidays) at the discretion of the local Electoral Register Office, but it remains an offence to vote more than once in the same local government election.) No party gained overall control of the chamber, although administrative power rested with the Mayor of Bristol, who had been first elected in November 2012

The Liberal Democrats, who had been the largest party on the council, lost 10 seats and conceded largest party status to Labour. The Green Party also gained 2 new seats, whilst Independents for Bristol gained their first seat on the council.

== Ward results ==
Bristol Council composition following the 2013 local elections

=== Ashley ===
Bristol City Council Elections: Ashley Ward 2013
Party	Candidate	Votes	%	±%
Green	Rob Telford	1,223	34.54	−8.11
Labour	Mary Caroline Southcott	1,056	29.82	+4.65
Liberal Democrats	Jon Charles Rogers	1,008	28.47	+0.78
Conservative	Iain Jenkins Dennis	101	2.85	−1.64
Independents for Bristol	Karl Belizaire	76	2.15	N/A
TUSC	Tom Baldwin	49	1.38	N/A
Birthday Party	Dave Dobbs	28	0.79	N/A
Majority		167	4.72	−10.24
Green gain from Liberal Democrats		Swing	-6.38	

=== Avonmouth ===
Bristol City Council Elections: Avonmouth Ward 2013
Party	Candidate	Votes	%	±%
Conservative	Wayne Raymond Harvey	1,068	39.38	+6.70
Labour	Nicola Bowden-Jones	824	30.38	−2.32
UKIP	Spud Murphy	648	23.89	N/A
Green	Justin Quinnell	80	2.95	+0.25
Liberal Democrats	Ian Humfrey Campion-Smith	64	2.36	−19.92
TUSC	Patrick Dorian Hulme	28	9.00	N/A
Majority		244	4.72	+4.70
Conservative hold		Swing	+4.51	

=== Bishopston ===
Bristol City Council Elections: Bishopston Ward 2013
Party	Candidate	Votes	%	±%
Green	Daniella Radice	1,256	36.10	+21.67
Labour	Kye Dudd	675	19.40	−1.48
Independents for Bristol	John James Hickey	665	19.11	N/A
Liberal Democrats	Chris Harris	626	17.99	−33.39
Conservative	Richard James Manns	225	6.47	−6.84
TUSC	Chris Farrell	32	0.92	N/A
Majority		581	16.70	−13.80
Green gain from Liberal Democrats		Swing	+11.58	

=== Cabot ===
Bristol City Council Elections: Cabot Ward 2013
Party	Candidate	Votes	%	±%
Liberal Democrats	Mark Michael Wright	852	40.61	+3.16
Labour	Simon Firth	541	25.79	+1.47
Green	Charlie Bolton	425	20.26	+1.06
Conservative	Chris Didcote	280	13.35	−3.46
Majority		311	14.82	+1.69
Liberal Democrats hold		Swing	+0.85	

=== Clifton ===
Bristol City Council Elections: Clifton Ward 2013
Party	Candidate	Votes	%	±%
Conservative	Charles James Hastings Lucas	638	26.76	+3.07
Independents for Bristol	Brenda Jane McLennan	547	22.94	N/A
Liberal Democrats	Andy Morgan	459	19.25	−20.62
Labour	Rosemary Chamberlin	320	13.42	−2.85
Green	Simon Stafford-Townsend	249	10.44	−8.93
UKIP	Alex Zychowski	171	7.17	N/A
Majority		91	3.82	−12.36
Conservative gain from Liberal Democrats		Swing	-9.94	

=== Clifton East ===
Bristol City Council Elections: Clifton East Ward 2013
Party	Candidate	Votes	%	±%
Liberal Democrats	Simon Timothy Cook	576	34.68	−0.26
Conservative	Gareth Alan-Williams	559	33.65	+3.14
Labour	Peter Kennedy-Chapman	268	16.13	−3.52
Green	Simon Bennett	258	15.53	+2.01
Majority		17	1.03	−3.40
Liberal Democrats hold		Swing	-1.70	

=== Cotham ===
Bristol City Council Elections: Cotham Ward 2013
Party	Candidate	Votes	%	±%
Liberal Democrats	Anthony Negus	942	41.37	+1.08
Labour	Eileen Lepine	563	24.73	+3.59
Green	Ani Stafford-Townsend	418	18.36	−1.45
Conservative	Christopher Morton	320	14.05	−3.36
TUSC	Caroline Louisa Vincent	34	1.49	+0.13
Majority		379	16.64	−2.51
Liberal Democrats hold		Swing	-1.26	

=== Easton ===
Bristol City Council Elections: Easton Ward 2013
Party	Candidate	Votes	%	±%
Labour	Afzal Shah	974	33.95	−4.02
Green	Anna McMullen	840	29.28	+2.09
Liberal Democrats	John Francis Kiely	698	24.33	−3.42
Independents for Bristol	Jane Westhead	267	9.31	N/A
Conservative	Tony Lee	90	3.14	−3.94
Majority		134	4.67	−5.55
Labour gain from Liberal Democrats		Swing	-3.06	

=== Eastville ===
Bristol City Council Elections: Eastville Ward 2013
Party	Candidate	Votes	%	±%
Labour	Mhairi Threlfall	1,021	39.50	−0.25
Liberal Democrats	Steven Robert Comer	1,020	39.46	+10.40
Conservative	Mike Williams	237	9.17	−8.16
Green	Josie McLellan	223	8.63	−1.90
TUSC	Mark Baker	84	3.25	N/A
Majority		1	0.04	−10.65
Labour gain from Liberal Democrats		Swing	-5.33	

=== Frome Vale ===
Bristol City Council Elections: Frome Vale Ward 2013
Party	Candidate	Votes	%	±%
Labour	Bill Payne	907	34.36	−2.38
Conservative	Nigel Currie	872	33.03	−12.18
UKIP	Steve Wood	573	21.70	N/A
Green	John Hills	144	5.45	−1.12
Liberal Democrats	Daniel Alexander Kelly	108	4.09	−1.81
TUSC	Philip John Bishop	36	1.36	−0.53
Majority		35	1.33	−7.14
Labour gain from Conservative		Swing	+4.90	

=== Henbury ===
Bristol City Council Elections: Henbury Ward 2013
Party	Candidate	Votes	%	±%
Conservative	Chris Windows	1,157	47.73	+12.79
Labour	Eileen Means	950	39.19	+6.88
Liberal Democrats	Mike Popham	153	6.31	−19.25
Green	Tim Malnick	134	5.53	+2.41
Birthday Party	Simon James Lewis	30	1.24	N/A
Majority		207	8.54	+5.91
Conservative hold		Swing	+2.10	

=== Henleaze ===
Bristol City Council Elections: Henleaze Ward 2013
Party	Candidate	Votes	%	±%
Liberal Democrats	Glenise Sweeting Morgan	1,559	44.49	−0.11
Conservative	Kevin Michael Staples	1,245	35.53	−5.39
Labour	Barry Thompson Trahar	439	12.53	+2.14
Green	Jane Devlin	261	7.45	+3.37
Majority		314	8.96	+5.28
Liberal Democrats hold		Swing	+2.64	

=== Hillfields ===
Bristol City Council Elections: Hillfields Ward 2013
Party	Candidate	Votes	%	±%
Labour	Noreen Daniels	1,089	52.97	+8.11
Conservative	Roy Towler	379	18.43	+1.09
Green	Rick Lovering	246	11.96	+6.06
TUSC	Matthew Gordon	188	9.14	+6.10
Liberal Democrats	Andrew Charles Brown	154	7.49	−21.38
Majority		710	34.54	+18.55
Labour gain from Liberal Democrats		Swing	+3.51	

=== Horfield ===
Bristol City Council Elections: Horfield Ward 2013
Party	Candidate	Votes	%	±%
Conservative	Claire Michelle Hiscott	721	28.57	−0.34
Labour	Oliver Mead	711	28.17	+6.13
Liberal Democrats	Cheryl Ann	579	22.94	−16.68
Independents for Bristol	Oliver Randall Mochizuki	241	9.55	N/A
Green	Jude English	237	9.39	+3.35
TUSC	John Yeandle	35	1.39	N/A
Majority		10	0.40	−10.31
Conservative gain from Liberal Democrats		Swing	-3.24	

=== Kingsweston ===
Bristol City Council Elections: Kingsweston Ward 2013
Party	Candidate	Votes	%	±%
Independents for Bristol	Jason Budd	620	27.60	N/A
Labour	Mike Thorne	584	26.00	−4.24
Liberal Democrats	Alex Smethurst	521	23.20	−11.96
Conservative	Barbara Madeleine Lewis	404	17.99	−7.33
Green	Lela McTernan	77	3.43	−0.28
TUSC	Roger Thomas	40	1.78	N/A
Majority		36	1.60	−3.32
Independents for Bristol gain from Liberal Democrats		Swing	+15.92	

=== Lawrence Hill ===
Bristol City Council Elections: Lawrence Hill Ward 2013
Party	Candidate	Votes	%	±%
Labour	Hibaq Jama	1,300	51.61	+10.04
UKIP	Pete Brown	324	12.86	N/A
Liberal Democrats	Abdul Raoof Malik	274	10.88	−16.25
Independents for Bristol	Christine Townsend	227	9.01	N/A
Green	Chloe Somers	207	8.22	−1.20
Conservative	David Lewis	121	4.80	−3.49
TUSC	Roger Thomas	66	2.62	+0.82
Majority		976	38.75	+24.31
Labour hold		Swing	-1.41	

=== Lockleaze ===
Bristol City Council Elections: Lockleaze Ward 2013
Party	Candidate	Votes	%	±%
Labour	Estella Tincknell	960	46.40	+14.30
Liberal Democrats	Guy James Baiden Poultney	624	30.16	−9.58
Conservative	Stephanie Joanne North	257	12.42	−4.43
Green	Chrissy Quinnell	228	11.02	+6.59
Majority		336	16.24	+8.60
Labour gain from Liberal Democrats		Swing	+11.94	

=== Redland ===
Bristol City Council Elections: Redland Ward 2013
Party	Candidate	Votes	%	±%
Liberal Democrats	Fi Hance	881	32.82	−11.82
Green	Martin Fodor	590	21.98	+3.49
Labour	Philip Jardine	535	19.93	+4.55
Conservative	Graham Roger Godwin-Pearson	448	16.69	−4.79
UKIP	Christine Thomas	200	7.45	N/A
TUSC	Martyn Joseph Ahmet	30	1.12	N/A
Majority		291	10.84	−12.32
Liberal Democrats hold		Swing	+7.66	

=== Southmead ===
Bristol City Council Elections: Southmead Ward 2013
Party	Candidate	Votes	%	±%
Labour	Brenda Massey	1,199	61.27	+15.74
Conservative	Rob Edwards	376	19.21	−12.19
Green	Chris Millman	178	9.10	+4.17
Liberal Democrats	Tom Stubbs	123	6.29	−8.69
TUSC	Domenico William Hill	81	4.14	+0.98
Majority		823	42.06	+27.93
Labour hold		Swing	+13.97	

=== St George East ===
Bristol City Council Elections: St George East Ward 2013
Party	Candidate	Votes	%	±%
Labour	Steve Pearce	1,056	50.02	−0.08
Conservative	Edward Alan Cullen	580	27.48	−4.27
Green	Don Brown	233	11.04	+4.73
Liberal Democrats	Paul Elvin	132	6.25	−2.57
TUSC	Mike Luff	110	5.21	+2.18
Majority		476	22.54	+4.19
Labour gain from Conservative		Swing	+2.01	

=== St George West ===
Bristol City Council Elections: St George West Ward 2013
Party	Candidate	Votes	%	±%
Labour	Ron Stone	1,052	46.71	+4.67
UKIP	Philip John Collins	520	23.09	N/A
Liberal Democrats	Tony Potter	284	12.61	−16.62
Green	Ben Appleby	174	7.73	−5.76
Conservative	Sarah Helen Cleave	168	7.46	−6.03
TUSC	Bernie Lyons	54	2.40	−0.04
Majority		532	23.62	+10.81
Labour hold		Swing	-9.21	

=== Stoke Bishop ===
Bristol City Council Elections: Stoke Bishop Ward 2013
Party	Candidate	Votes	%	±%
Conservative	Peter John Abraham	1,724	68.39	+12.41
Labour	Jasvant Singh Badesha	307	12.18	+2.46
Liberal Democrats	Mary Elizabeth Page	276	10.95	−17.42
Green	Geoff Collard	214	8.49	+2.56
Majority		1417	56.21	+28.60
Conservative hold		Swing	+4.98	

=== Westbury-on-Trym ===
Bristol City Council Elections: Westbury-on-Trym Ward 2013
Party	Candidate	Votes	%	±%
Conservative	Geoffrey Richard Gollop	1,742	51.00	+4.31
Independents for Bristol	Helen Louise Mott	800	23.42	N/A
Labour	Gillian Kirk	424	12.41	+0.60
Liberal Democrats	Graham Christopher Donald	290	8.49	−25.59
Green	Alex Dunn	160	4.68	−1.40
Majority		942	27.58	+14.97
Conservative hold		Swing	-9.56	
