= Filwood =

Electoral ward of Bristol, England

Coordinates: 51.4260°N 2.5843°W

- ward Bristol City Council
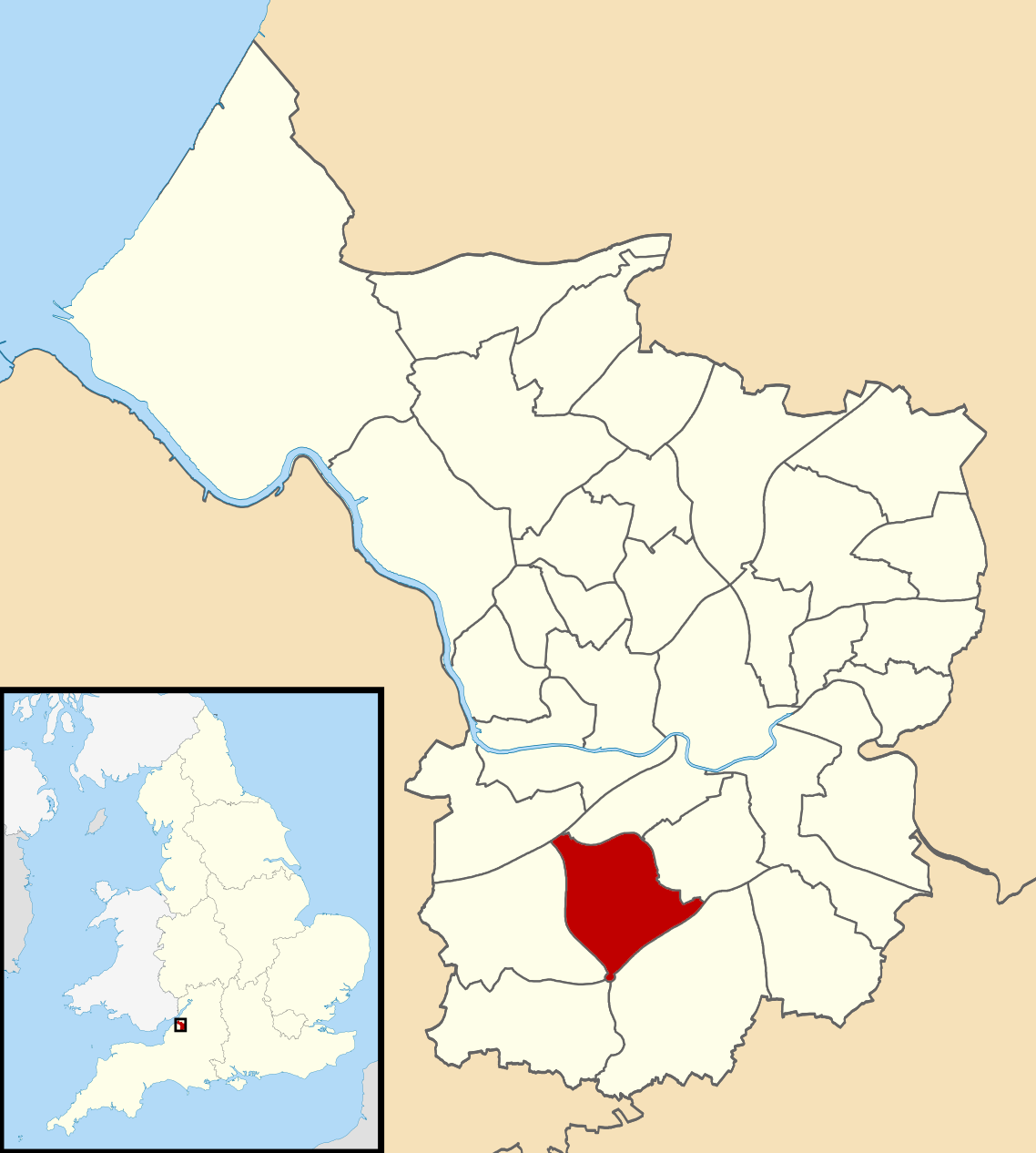
- Ward boundaries since 2016.
- County: Bristol
- Population: 14,299
- Electorate: 10,084

Current ward
- Created: 1980
- Councillor: Lisa Durston (Labour)
- Councillor: Rob Logan (Labour)
- UK Parliament constituency: Bristol South

Filwood is an electoral ward of the city of Bristol, England. It lies in the south of the city and covers the suburbs of Filwood Park and Inns Court, and a large part of Knowle West.

Filwood is represented by two members on Bristol City Council, which as of 2024 are Lisa Durston and Rob Logan of the Labour Party.

Filwood ward was first created in 1980, with small changes made to the ward boundaries ahead the 1999 local election, and again ahead of the 2016 local election.

== Area profile ==
The ward contains primarily residential neighbourhoods. Filwood Park and Knowle West originated as council estates in Britain's interwar housing boom. Inns Court (sometimes written Inn's Court) was built in the 1960s. There are also small areas of 21st century housing in the ward. The housing is typically semi-detached (57%) or terraced (27.2%) family homes, with 72.4% having 3 or more bedrooms; 48% is owner-occupied and 38.2 social rented.

Areas in the ward score highly on measures of deprivation, with all areas in the top quartile of England's most deprived. The Inns Court, Filwood Broadway and Throgmorton Road areas rank in England's top 2% most deprived. Educational attainment is relatively low, with 23.5% of people holding a degree, significantly lower than the Bristol average of 42.1%; and children in the ward achieving an average Attainment 8 Score of 35.1, compared to 44.9 average in Bristol. Residents of Filwood are more likely to claim unemployment related benefits, at 5.36%, than the Bristol average of 3.41%, and are more likely to claim pension credit, at 25.89% of the population aged 65 and over, than the Bristol average of 13.04%. Residents are more likely to report a long-term health condition or disability (22.3%) than the Bristol average (17.2%), and the premature mortality rate is higher in Filwood, at 554.5 per 100,000, than the Bristol average of 398.1 per 100,000.

The reported crime rate in the ward is very close to the Bristol average, but residents are significantly more likely to report that they feel anti-social behaviour is a problem in their local area, at 68.8% of Filwood residents compared to 35.6% of Bristol residents.

The ward has a number of primary schools.

Inns Court contains a bus depot belonging to FirstGroup.

For elections to the Parliament of the United Kingdom it is in the Bristol South constituency.

== Election history ==
=== 2024 election ===
Filwood (2 seats)
Party	Candidate	Votes	%	±%
Labour	Lisa Durston	1,088	51.08	+11.13
Labour	Rob Logan	1,004	47.14	+10.16
Green	Danica Priest	640	30.05	+8.73
Green	Jai Breitnauer	637	29.91	+11.91
Conservative	Paul Harding	223	10.47	−6.96
Conservative	Paul Keith-Hill	196	9.20	−2.90
Liberal Democrats	Gregory Chadwick	98	4.60	−3.09
TUSC	Robin Victor Clapp	77	3.62	−0.91
Liberal Democrats	Benjamin Goldstrom	49	2.30	−3.09
Turnout		2,130	21.49	−3.96
Labour hold				
Labour hold				

=== 2021 election ===
Filwood (2 seats)
Party	Candidate	Votes	%	±%
Labour	Zoe Goodman	1,023	39.95	−20.35
Labour	Chris Jackson	947	36.98	−10.63
Green	Harriet Hansen	546	21.32	+5.98
Green	Barney Smith	461	18.00	+18.00
Conservative	Sylvia Christine Windows	446	17.42	+7.23
Conservative	Jojimon Kuriakose	310	12.10	+3.48
Liberal Democrats	Jackie Norman	197	7.69	−0.93
Liberal Democrats	Crispin Allard	138	5.39	+0.39
TUSC	Robin Victor Clapp	116	4.53	−3.72
Turnout		2,561	25.45	−3.97
Labour hold				
Labour hold				

=== 2016 election ===
Filwood (2 seats)
Party	Candidate	Votes	%	±%
Labour	Christopher David Jackson	1,616	60.30	
Labour	Jeff Lovell	1,276	47.61	
Green	Makala Claire Cheung	411	15.34	
Conservative	Sylvia Christine Windows	273	10.19	
Conservative	Anthony Kwan	237	8.84	
Liberal Democrats	Paula Frances Nixon	231	8.62	
TUSC	Robin Victor Clapp	221	8.25	
Liberal Democrats	Jackie Norman	134	5.00	
TUSC	Anthony Brian Rowe	124	4.63	
Turnout		2,680	29.42	
Labour hold		Swing		
Labour hold		Swing		

=== 2015 election ===
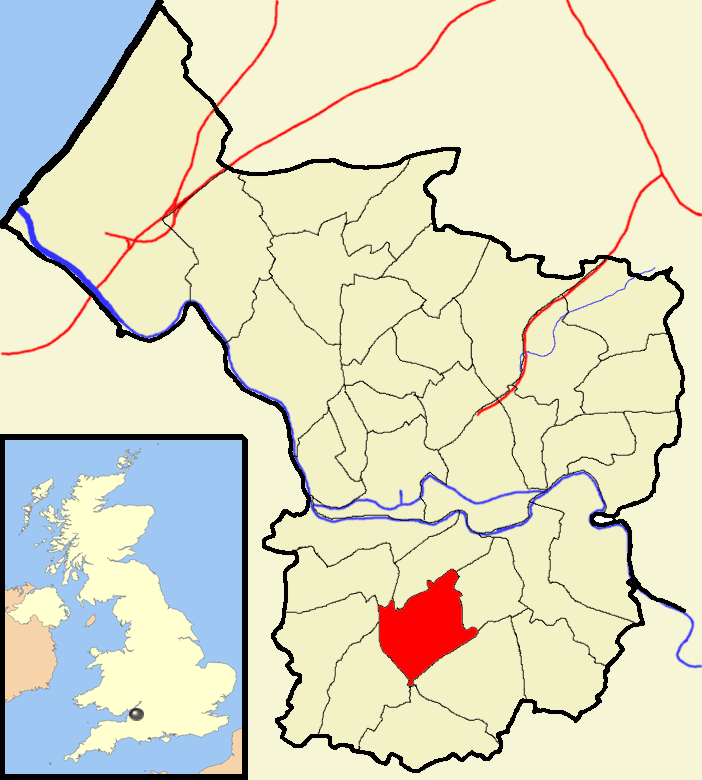
Filwood ward boundaries before 2016.

The 2015 Bristol City Council election was the last election to take place under the system of thirds, in which elections took place in three out of every four years, with (approximately) one third of seats contested at each election. Under this system, Filwood was represented by two members, and therefore elected one member in two of the three election years.

Bristol City Council Elections: Filwood Ward 2015
Party	Candidate	Votes	%	±%
Labour	Jeff Lovell	1980	47.30	−12.09
UKIP	Terence Richard Daniel Thomas	1031	24.63	N/A
Conservative	Sylvia Christine Windows	588	14.05	+0.65
Green	Stephen Petter	353	8.43	−6.49
Liberal Democrats	Crispin Toby John Allard	200	4.78	+0.24
TUSC	Tony Rowe	34	0.81	−6.94
Majority		949	22.67	−21.8
Labour hold		Swing	-18.36	

=== 2014 election ===
Bristol City Council Elections: Filwood Ward 2014
Party	Candidate	Votes	%	±%
Labour	Christopher David Jackson	1,334	59.39	−4.45
Green	Ryan Brinkley	335	14.92	+10.00
Conservative	Sylvia Christine Windows	301	13.40	−0.45
TUSC	Marion Jackson	174	7.75	+6.15
Liberal Democrats	Crispin Allard	102	4.54	−1.62
Majority		999	44.47	−5.19
Labour hold		Swing	-7.23	

=== 2011 election ===
Bristol City Council Elections: Filwood Ward 2011
Party	Candidate	Votes	%	±%
Labour	Jeff Lovell	1,400	63.84	+11.14
Conservative	Paul Francis Smith	311	14.18	−2.47
Liberal Democrats	Roger Graham Norman	135	6.16	−10.13
BNP	Michael John Hamblin	112	5.11	−3.31
Green	Stephen Petter	108	4.92	+1.74
English Democrat	Barbara Ann Wright	92	4.20	+1.44
TUSC	Wayne Jefferson Coombes	35	1.60	N/A
Majority		1089	49.66	+13.61
Labour hold		Swing	+6.81	

=== 2010 election ===
Bristol City Council Elections: Filwood Ward 2010
Party	Candidate	Votes	%	±%
Labour	Christopher David Jackson	2,003	52.70	−14.53
Conservative	Sylvia Christine Windows	633	16.65	+2.09
Liberal Democrats	Joel Sudworth	619	16.29	+5.78
BNP	Michael John Hamblin	320	8.42	N/A
Green	Graham Hugh Davey	121	3.18	−4.51
English Democrat	Toby Daniel Hector	105	2.76	N/A
Majority		1370	36.05	−16.62
Labour hold		Swing	-8.31	
