= Independents for Bristol =

British political party

Independents For Bristol (IFB) was a British political party for Independent candidates who wished to stand for either local government election or parliamentary election. IFB did not dictate policy but instead enabled individuals to become candidates. The Electoral Commission noted its voluntary deregistration as a political party on 22 July 2016.

== History ==
Independents for Bristol was formed in January 2013. At the time, Bristol was unusual in not having any independent councillors. The role of ward councillors had also changed, due to the introduction of the new role of Bristol elected mayor. Eight candidates ran in the May 2013 local elections under the banner of Independents for Bristol. One candidate, Jason Budd, was elected an independent councillor for Kingsweston in Bristol. Jason Budd later joined to the Conservatives and sat as a Conservative councillor.

Independents For Bristol had their first prospective parliamentary candidate, Dawn Parry, standing for Bristol West in May 2015 general election. She polled 204 votes, 0.3% of the turnout.

== Bell Principles ==
Independents For Bristol supported candidates who agreed to the Bell Principles, which included abiding by the spirit and letter of the Seven Principles of Public Life set out by Lord Nolan in 1995: selflessness, integrity, objectivity, accountability, openness, honesty and leadership.

== See also ==
- Politics of Bristol
