= St George East =

District on the eastern edge of Bristol, England

Coordinates: 51°27′35″N 2°31′42″W

- Location of St George East ward within Bristol
- Population: 12,157
- Unitary authority: Bristol
- Ceremonial county: Bristol
- Region: South West
- Country: England
- Sovereign state: United Kingdom
- Post town: BRISTOL
- Postcode district: BS5, BS15
- Dialling code: 0117
- Police: Avon and Somerset
- Fire: Avon
- Ambulance: South Western

St George East is a district (ward) on the eastern edge of Bristol, England. It includes the neighbourhoods of St. George, Burchells Green, Crew's Hole, and Two Mile Hill.

== Crew's Hole ==
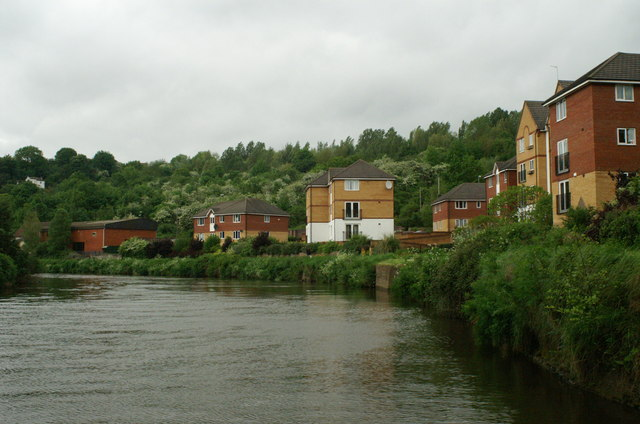
Houses on Quayside Lane near Crew's Hole

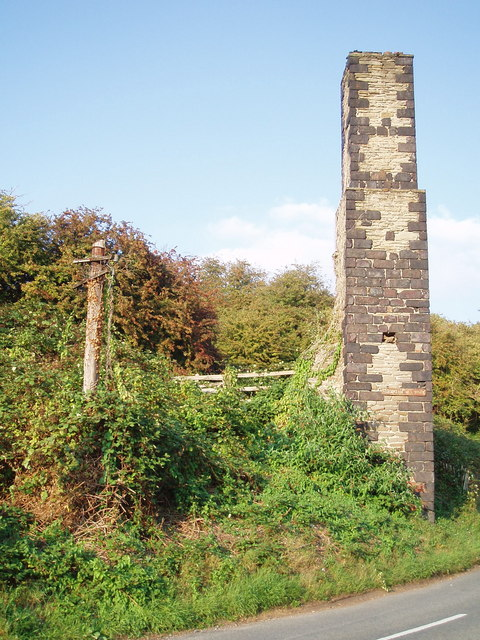
Remains of a factory on Crew's Hole Road

Crew's Hole is located in east Bristol near St George.

From the early 18th century, Crew's Hole was an industrial area that included oil refineries and a tar works site at the bottom of Troopers Hill.

The tar works was established by Isambard Kingdom Brunel in 1843 to provide creosote to be used as a preservative for railway sleepers and by 1863 had passed into the ownership of Brunel's manager, William Butler. It continued to operate until 1981.

== Two Mile Hill ==
Two Mile Hill is an area on the eastern edge of St. George East, bordering Kingswood.

== Population ==
According to the 2001 Census, there are 11,348 people living in St George East, with over 95% of the population being white. It has only seven Jewish residents.

== See also ==
- Districts of Bristol
- Public transport in Bristol
