= History of local government in Bristol =

History of city and county in England

Bristol City Council, formerly known as the Bristol Corporation (and colloquially as "The Corporation"), is the local government authority governing the city of Bristol, England. Following the Norman Conquest of England in 1066, successive royal charters granted increasing rights of local governance to Bristol. County status was attained in 1373 and city status in the early sixteenth century. Bristol Corporation was established in the nineteenth century and the office of Lord Mayor was created in 1888. Following a brief period as part of the county of Avon in the late twentieth century, Bristol regained its status as a city and county in 1996.

== Origins ==
The exact date of establishment of a town council is unknown. The Domesday survey recorded that Bristol, then known as Brygstowe was part of the royal manor of Barton and was a borough governed by a reeve, and assessed at 110 marks. Charters confirming rights and duties were granted by Henry II in 1172 and by John in 1190. The first known mayor was Roger Cordwainer, who is referred to in Crown documents from the summer of 1216. He, however, appears to have been an appointee of King John. The first mayor chosen by the townspeople was Adam Le Page, who took office on 29 September 1216. As the town developed the mayor was assisted by provosts, later known as stewards and bailiffs. A list of mayors dating from 1216 was published by the town clerk, Robert Ricart, in 1479. A charter granted by Henry III in 1256, extended the town's rights, enabling the burgesses to choose coroners and to farm the fees payable to the king.

== County and city status ==
In 1373, Edward III granted a charter to Bristol stating that:

We have conceded to our beloved burgesses of our town of Bristol and to their heirs and successors in perpetuity that the town of Bristol with its suburbs and precincts shall henceforth be separate from the counties of Gloucester and Somerset and be in all things exempt both by land and by sea, and that it should be a county by itself, to be called the county of Bristol in perpetuity, and that the burgesses and their heirs and successors should have in perpetuity within the town of Bristol and its suburbs and precincts certain liberties and exemptions and enjoy them fully and use them as is more fully contained in the said charter.

Bristol was the first provincial town to be given this status. The first act of the new county, required by the royal charter, was that the boundaries of the county be surveyed. In later centuries the perambulation of the county boundary by the mayor and sheriff became an annual civic ritual performed jointly by the outgoing and incoming mayor and sheriffs, along with the aldmermen and others.

Bristol was first described as a city in a charter of Elizabeth I in 1581, but this document suggests that Bristol had been granted city status at the time of Henry VII. The Municipal Corporations Act 1835 established Bristol Corporation, which consisted of 48 councillors and 18 aldermen. The term Corporation of Bristol or Bristol Corporation, encompassing the mayor and common council, had been in use since the eighteenth century at least. Bristol became a county borough in 1888 and the boundaries were extended into Gloucestershire and Somerset.

== Mayors ==
The first historically recorded mayor of Bristol was Roger Cordewainer who is referred to in orders issued by King John in 1216. He, however, was a royal appointment. From the Middle Ages to the nineteenth century Bristol treated Adam le Page (appointed 29 September 1216) as its first mayor, probably because he was the first to be chosen by the town for an annual one-year office. Following the Bristol riots of 1831 the then incumbent mayor of Bristol Charles Pinney was tried in London for negligence, but found innocent. This was one of many local disturbances throughout England leading to the Municipal Corporations Act 1835 and the installation of a permanent mayoral office.

From early times the mayor was the chief officer of the council, elected by the members of the common council. The position of mayoress was usually held by the wife or daughter of the mayor. In 1899, Queen Victoria granted the mayor the right to be styled Lord Mayor. When a woman served she was still referred to as lord mayor, rather than lady mayoress.

In 2012, the new post of Mayor of Bristol was created following a referendum held on 3 May. The first elections to the new post were held on 15 November 2012, and resulted in the election of George Ferguson (Independent). This post differs from that of the Lord Mayor. It will be an executive role as opposed to the first citizen civic representative role of the Lord Mayor.

In 2017 the elected role of Mayor of the West of England was created covering an area that includes Bristol with new powers outside the Mayor of Bristol role.

In December 2021, the majority of opposition councillors backed a legally binding motion to hold a referendum on the future of the role of the Elected Mayor of Bristol. The referendum, which took place in May 2022, offered Bristolians the choice of keeping an elected mayor or going back to the committee system of governance that was in place before Ferguson became the city's first directly elected mayor in November 2012. The result was 59% of voters choosing to abolish the role of mayor at the end of current Mayor Marvin Rees' term in 2024.

== Avon and after ==
From 1974 to 1996, Bristol was subsumed into the new county of Avon following the Redcliffe-Maud Report. Avon was abolished in 1996 and the city became a unitary authority, styled as the City and County of Bristol.

In 2017 the West of England Combined Authority and Mayor of the West of England were created covering the local authorities of Bristol, South Gloucestershire, and Bath and North East Somerset. Powers include transport and strategic planning for the combined areas.

== See also ==
- High Sheriff of Bristol
- History of Bristol
- History of Bristol City Council
- List of mayors of Bristol
- Mayor of Bristol
- Politics of Bristol
