= History of Bristol City Council =

Bristol City Council is a unitary authority and ceremonial county in England. Originally formed on 1 April 1974 as a non-metropolitan district as a result of the Local Government Act 1972 (with initial elections taking place in 1973). It was envisaged that Bristol would share power with Avon County Council, an arrangement that lasted until 1996 when it was made into a unitary authority by the Local Government Commission for England, which abolished the county of Avon and gave Bristol City Council control of Avon Council's responsibilities.

From 2012 to 2024, Bristol had a directly elected Mayor, who acted as an executive branch separate from elected councillors.

Since the 1300s Bristol has been The City and County of Bristol and is in neither Somerset or Gloucester. For Admin it came under Avon which is not a county.

== Elected mayors ==
The position of mayor of Bristol was created following the English mayoral referendum on 4 May 2012, in which Bristol was the only city to vote in favour of introducing an elected mayor. The first mayoral election was held in November, being won by George Ferguson.

Year	Party	Mayor
May 2016 – May 2024	Labour	Marvin Rees
November 2012 – May 2016	Independent (as Bristol 1st)	George Ferguson

== Council control ==
From 2016 all councillors are elected every four years. Prior to that, a third of the councillors were elected every year.

A single party must occupy more than half of the councillor seats to have control. It is possible for a party to control the council without a majority, such as when Labour councillors dissolved their coalition with the Liberal Democrats in February 2009, leaving the Liberal Democrats to form a minority leadership.

Year	Controlling party	Notes
2021–present	No Overall Control	Directly elected mayor - Labour
2016–2021	Labour	Directly elected mayor - Labour
2011–2016	No Overall Control	Directly elected mayor 2012-2016 - independent
2009–2011	Liberal Democrats	
2003–2009	No Overall Control	
1986–2003	Labour	Council changed to a unitary authority in 1995.
1983–1986	No Overall Control	
1973–1983	Labour	

== Council composition ==
Year	Labour	Conservative	Lib Dems	Green	UKIP	Independent	Notes
December 2023	23	14	5	25		3	Zoe Goodman (Filwood) resigned from Labour over its response to what she called "the genocide in Gaza", becoming an Independent councillor.
February 2023	24	14	5	25		2	Green Party candidate Patrick McAllister wins the Hotwells and Harbourside by-election following the resignation of Liberal Democrat councillor Alex Hartley.
December 2021	24	14	6	24		2	Chris Davies and Gary Hopkins (both Knowle) leave the Liberal Democrats and create the Knowle Community Party.
May 2021	24	14	8	24			
23 March 2021	35	14	9	12			Jo Sergeant (Avonmouth and Lawrence Weston) joins the Green Party.
12 March 2021	35	14	9	11		1	Jo Sergeant (Avonmouth and Lawrence Weston) resigns from the Labour Party.
26 September 2019	36	14	9	11			Tony Carey (Brislington East) joins the Liberal Democrats.
29 August 2019	36	14	8	11		1	Sultan Khan (Eastville) joins the Liberal Democrats.
17 July 2019	36	14	7	11		2	Tony Carey (Brislington East) resigns from the Conservative Party and sits as an independent.
22 March 2019	36	15	7	11		1	Sultan Khan (Eastville) resigns from the Labour Party and sits as an independent.
24 May 2018	37	15	7	11			Westbury-on-Trym and Henleaze by-election.
1 November 2016	37	14	8	11			The Labour Party lifts the suspensions of Harriet Bradley (Brislington West) and Mike Langley (Brislington East). Hibaq Jama (Lawrence Hill) is also unsuspended at a later date.
19 September 2016	34	14	8	11		3	The Labour Party suspends Mike Langley (Brislington East) and Hibaq Jama (Lawrence Hill).
8 September 2016	36	14	8	11		1	The Labour Party suspends Harriet Bradley (Brislington West).
May 2016	37	14	8	11			Ward boundaries changed.
21 May 2015	30	16	9	14	1		Fi Hance (Redland) defected from the Liberal Democrats to the Green Party.
7 May 2015	30	16	10	13	1		
March 2015	31	16	16	6	1		Jason Budd (Kingsweston), formerly independent, joined the Conservative Party.
May 2014	31	15	16	6	1	1	
May 2013	28	14	23	4		1	
September 2011	22	14	32	2			Southmead by-election.
May 2011	21	14	33	2			
May 2010	17	14	38	1			
May 2009	16	17	36	1			
October 2008	24	13	32	1			St George West by-election triggered due to the death of one of the sitting councillors.
May 2007	25	13	31	1			
May 2006	23	13	33	1			
May 2005	27	11	32				
May 2004	31	11	28				Lawrence Hill by-election.
May 2003	31	11	28				
May 2002	36	10	24				
June 2001	40	9	21				
October 2000	36	10	24				Southville by-election.
February 2000	36	10	24				Lockleaze by-election.
May 1999	37	10	23				Ward boundaries changed. Number of seats available increased from 68 to 70.
June 1998	45	6	17				Ashley by-election.
May 1998	46	6	16				
March 1998	50	5	13				Cabot by-election.
June 1997	50	5	13				Brislington West by-election.
May 1997	51	5	12				
May 1995	53	6	9				Council changed from a non-metropolitan district to a unitary authority.
May 1994	41	19	8				
May 1992	40	22	6				
May 1991	45	18	5				
May 1990	43	21	4				
May 1988	39	24	5				
May 1987	37	25	6				
May 1986	35	26	7				
May 1984	33	29	6				City boundaries were changed but the number of seats stayed the same.
May 1983	30	32	6				Ward boundaries changed. Number of seats available decreased from 84 to 68.
May 1979	53	28	3				
May 1976	47	34	3				
June 1973	56	25	3				Formation of the Bristol non-metropolitan district, with 84 available seats.

=== Council election result maps ===
2021 results map

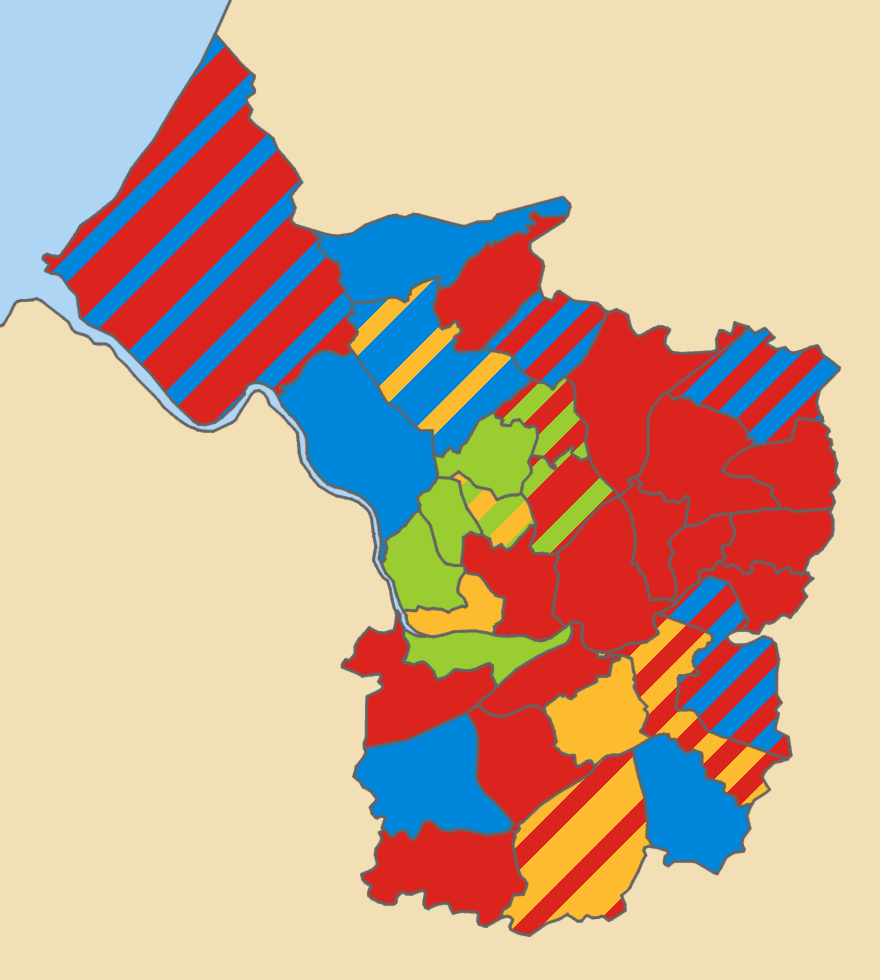
2016 results map

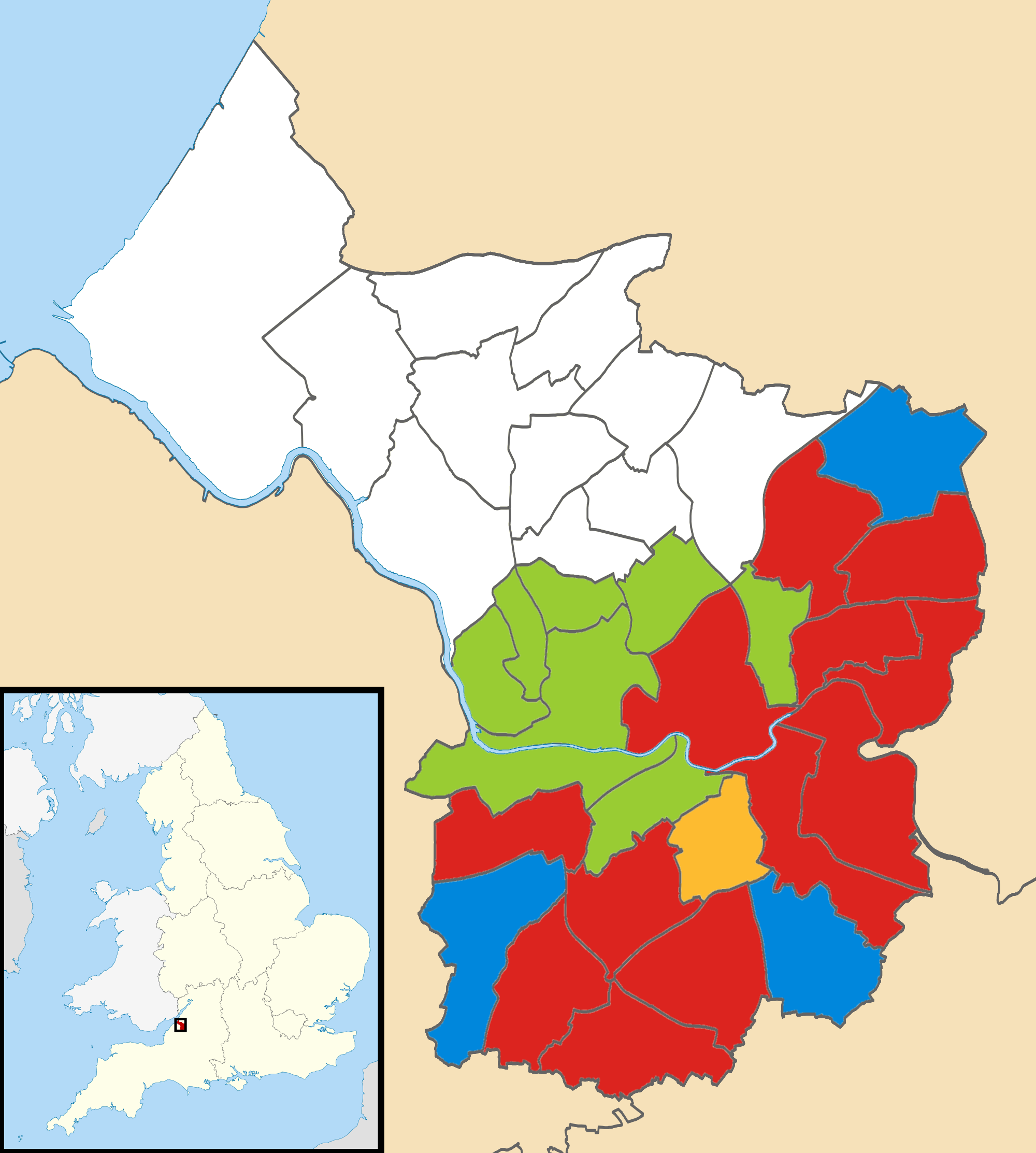
2015 results map

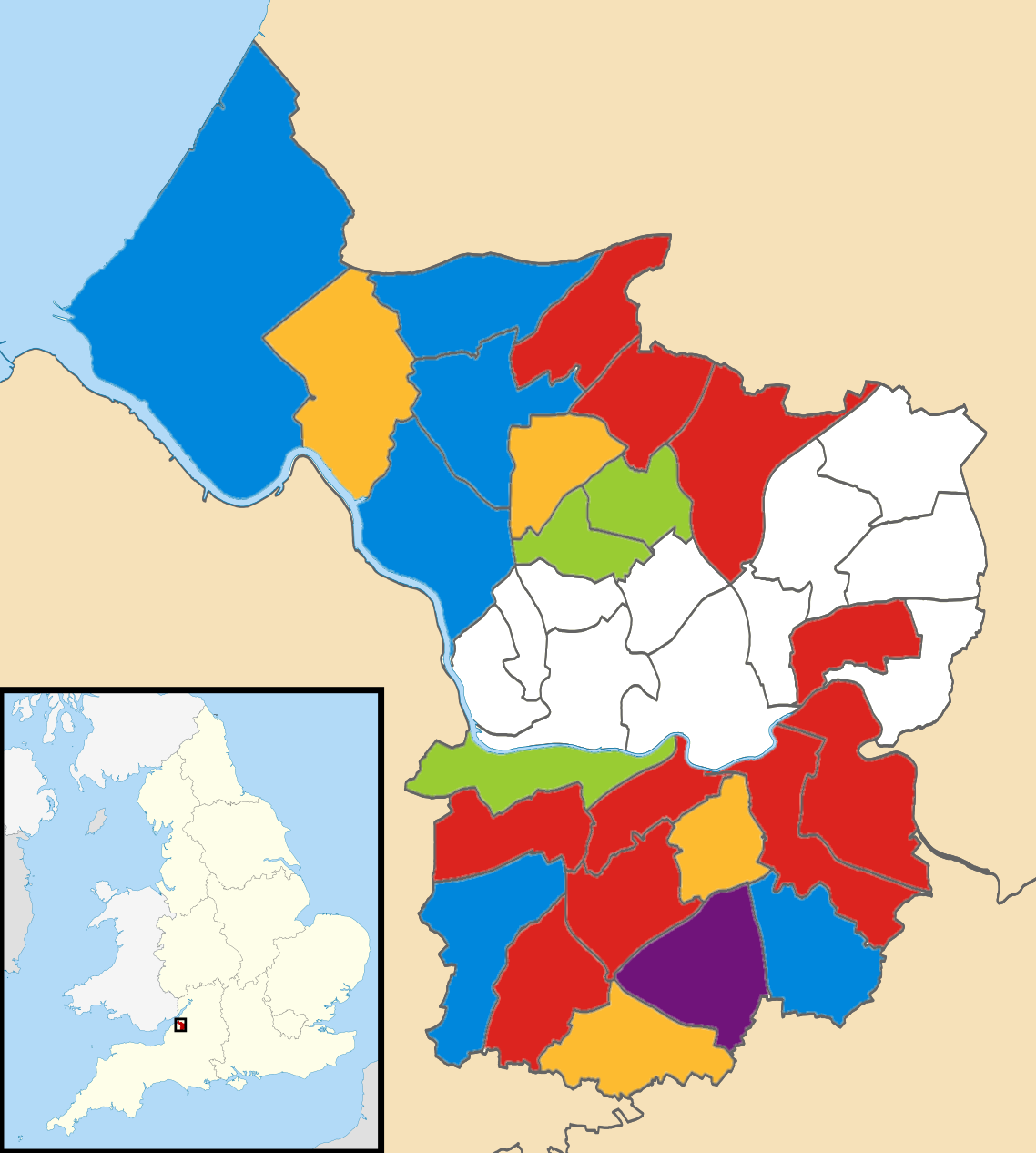
2014 results map

2013 results map

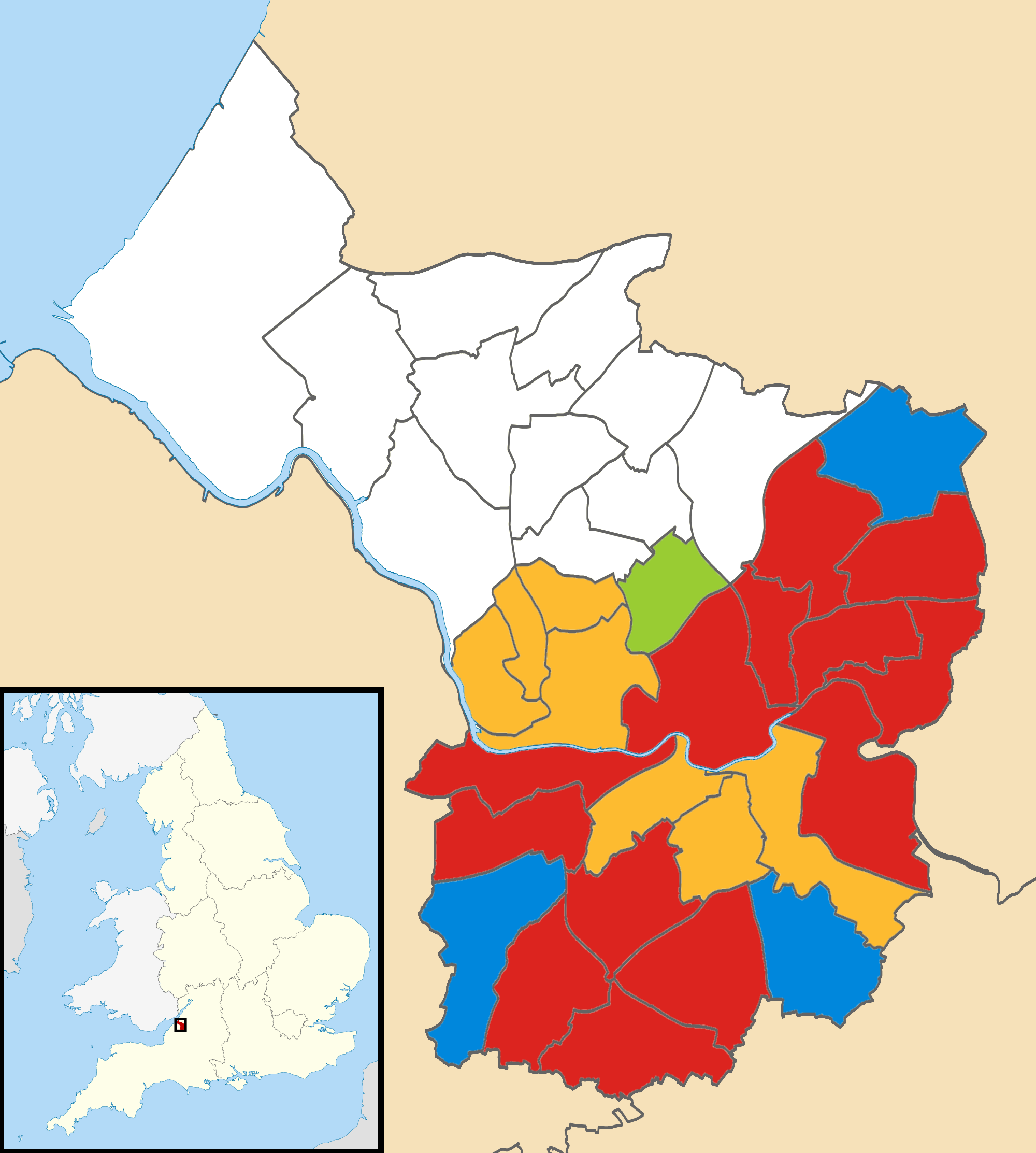
2011 results map

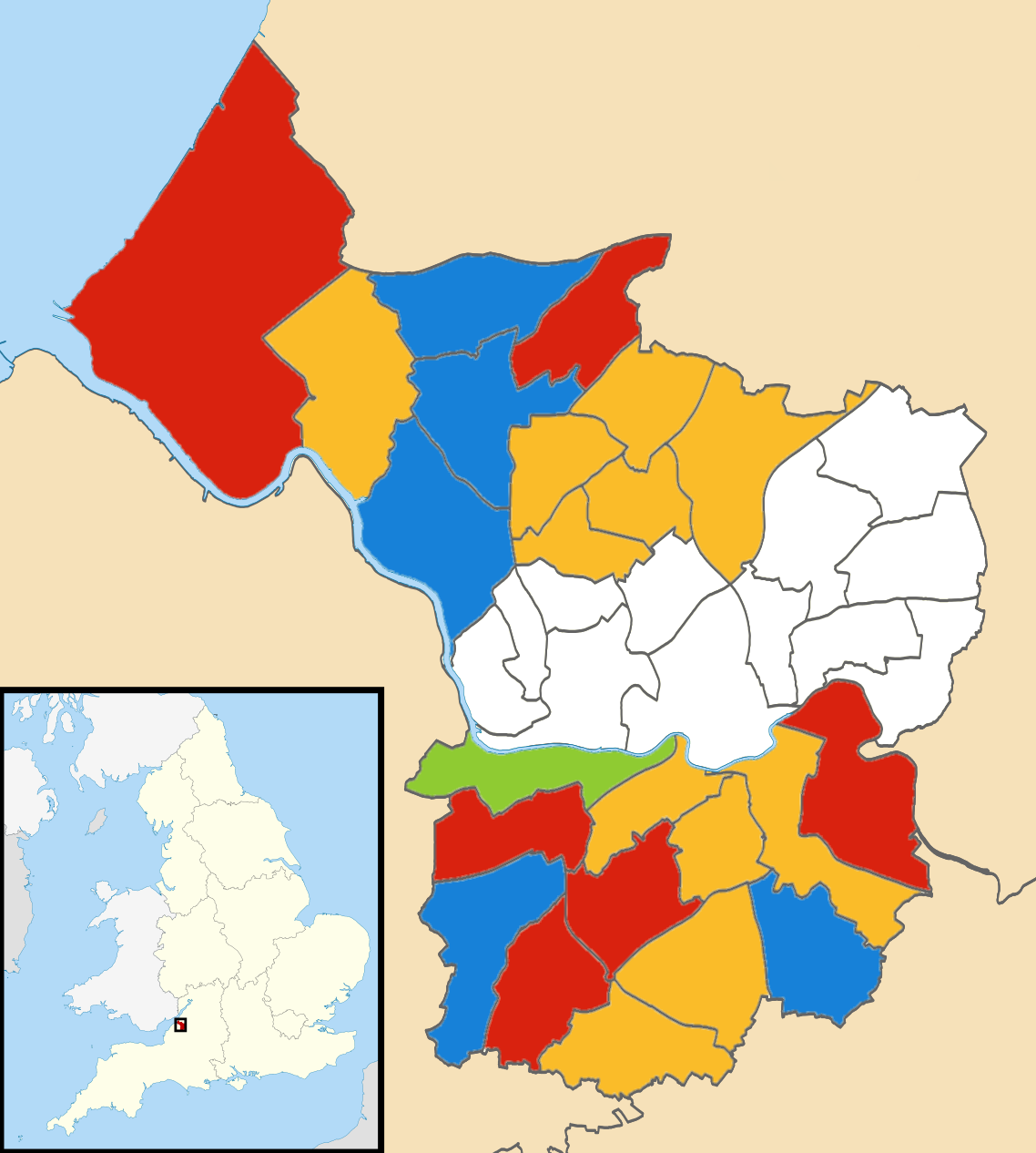
2010 results map

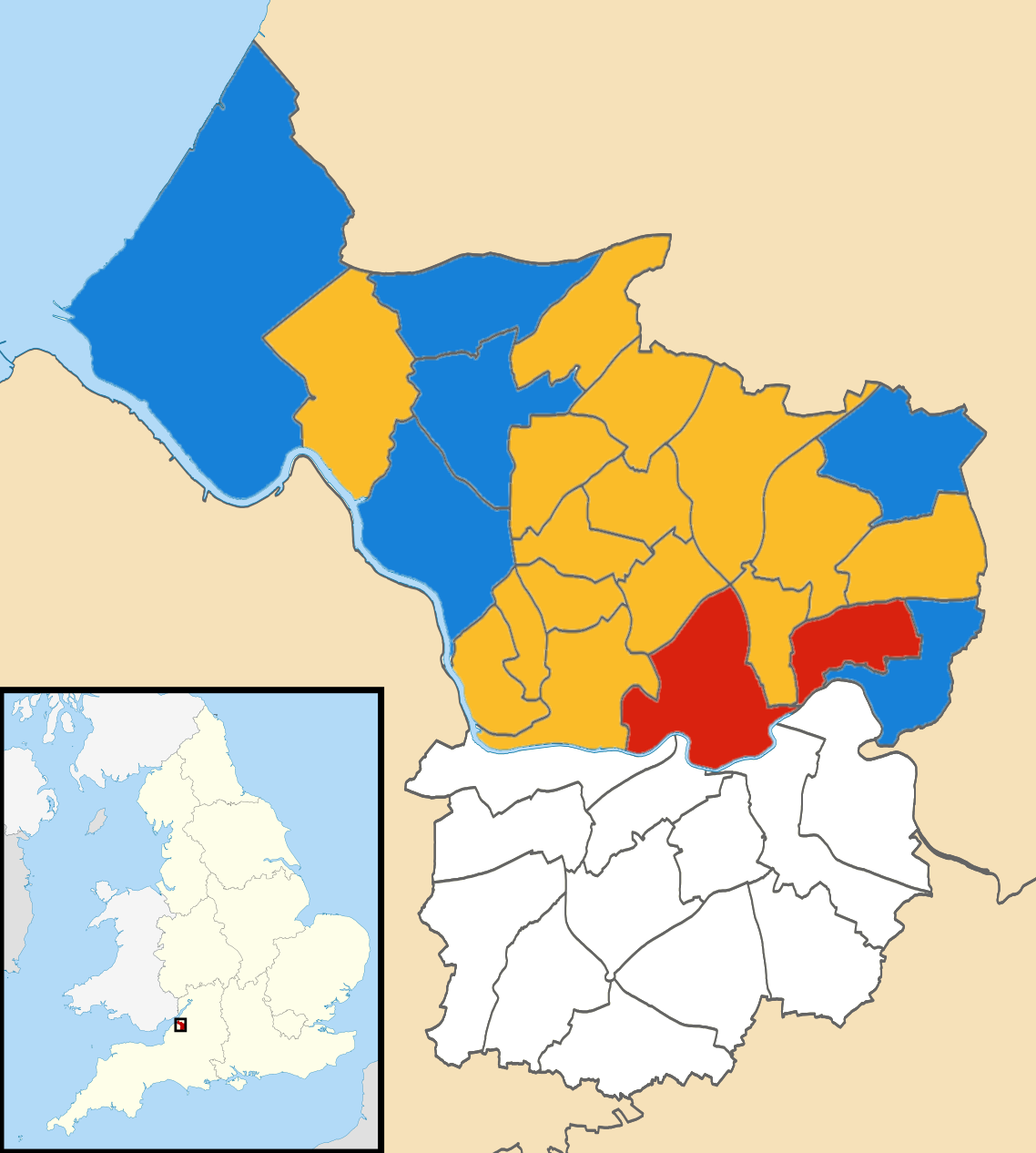
2009 results map

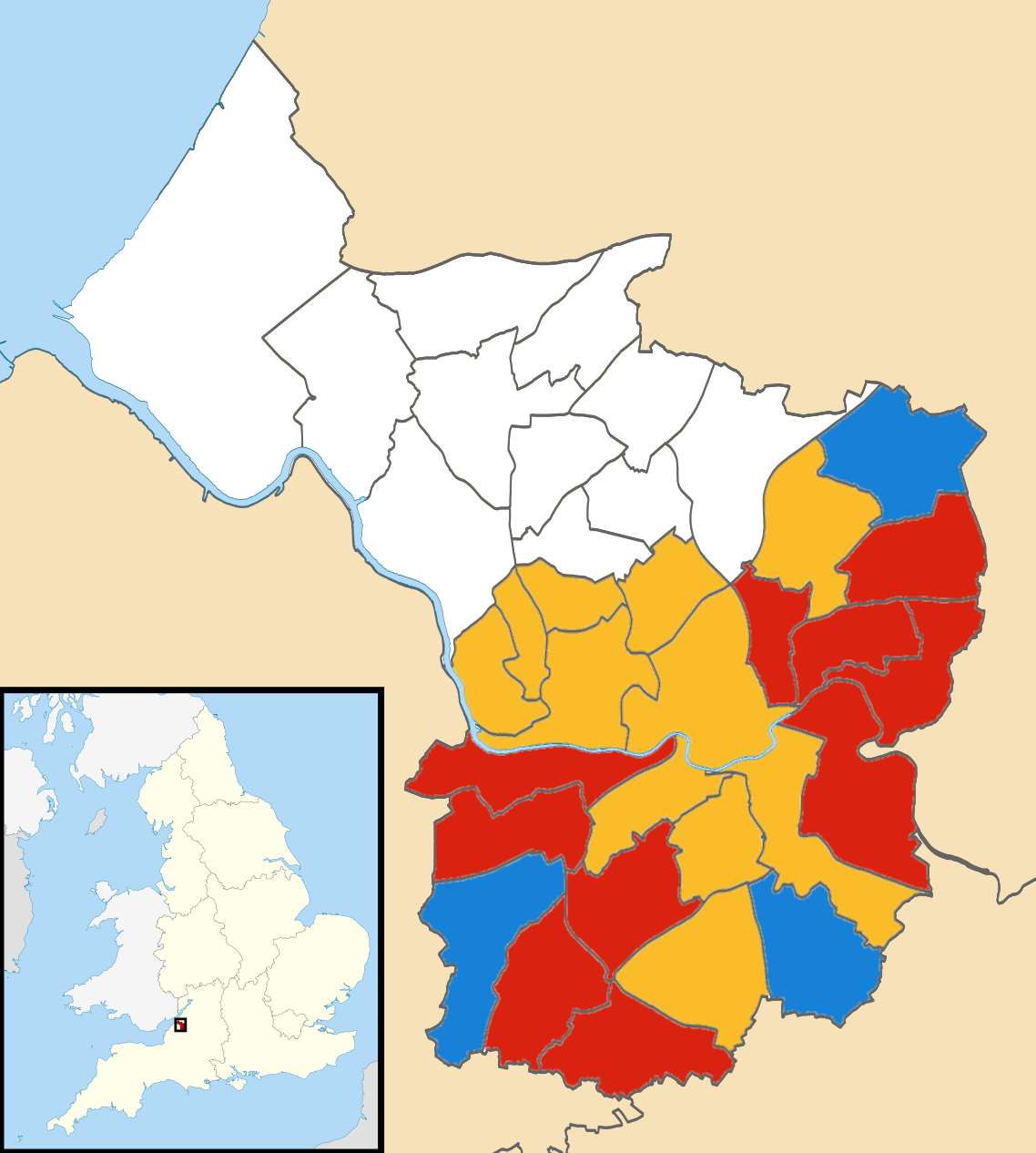
2007 results map

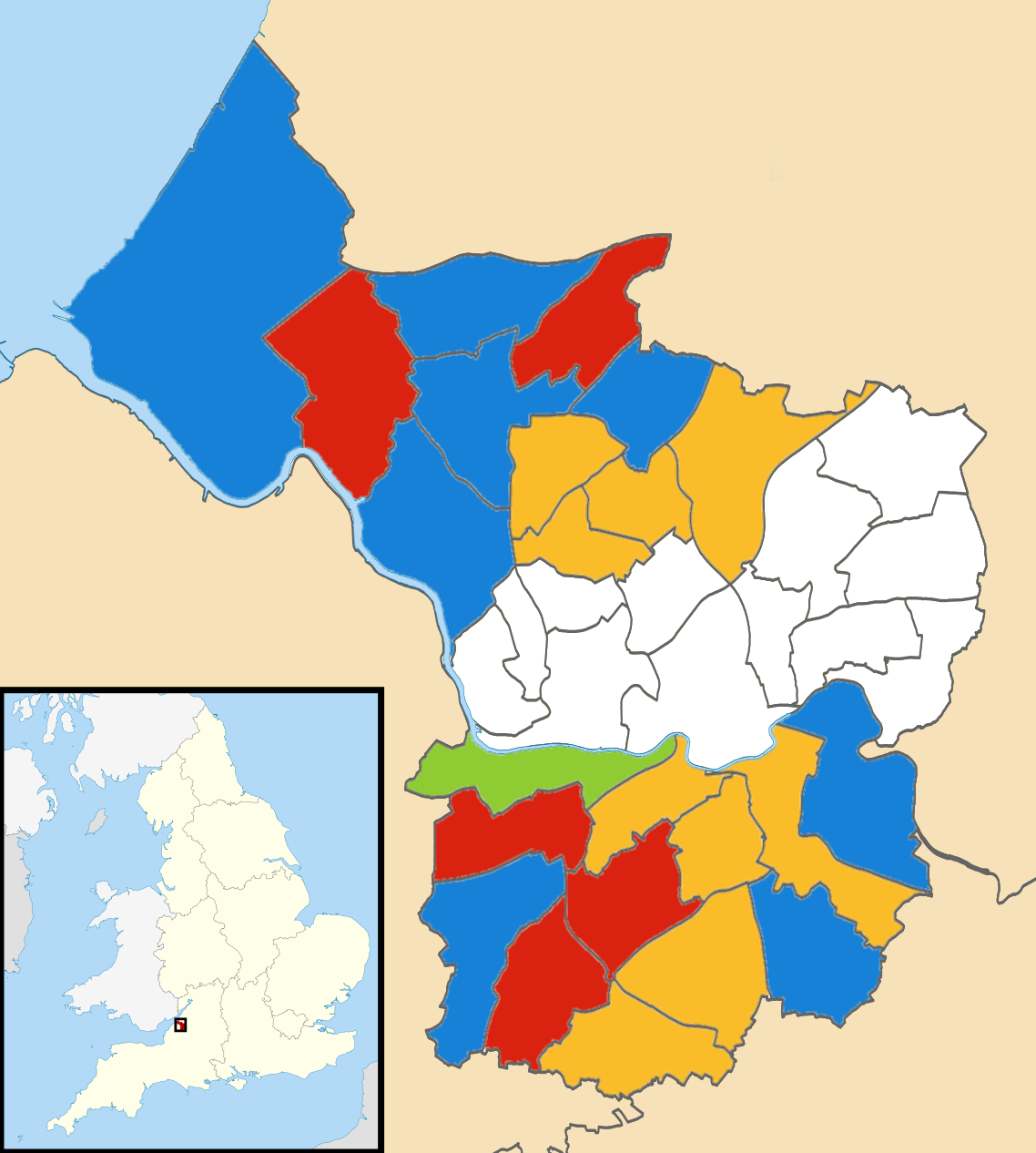
2006 results map

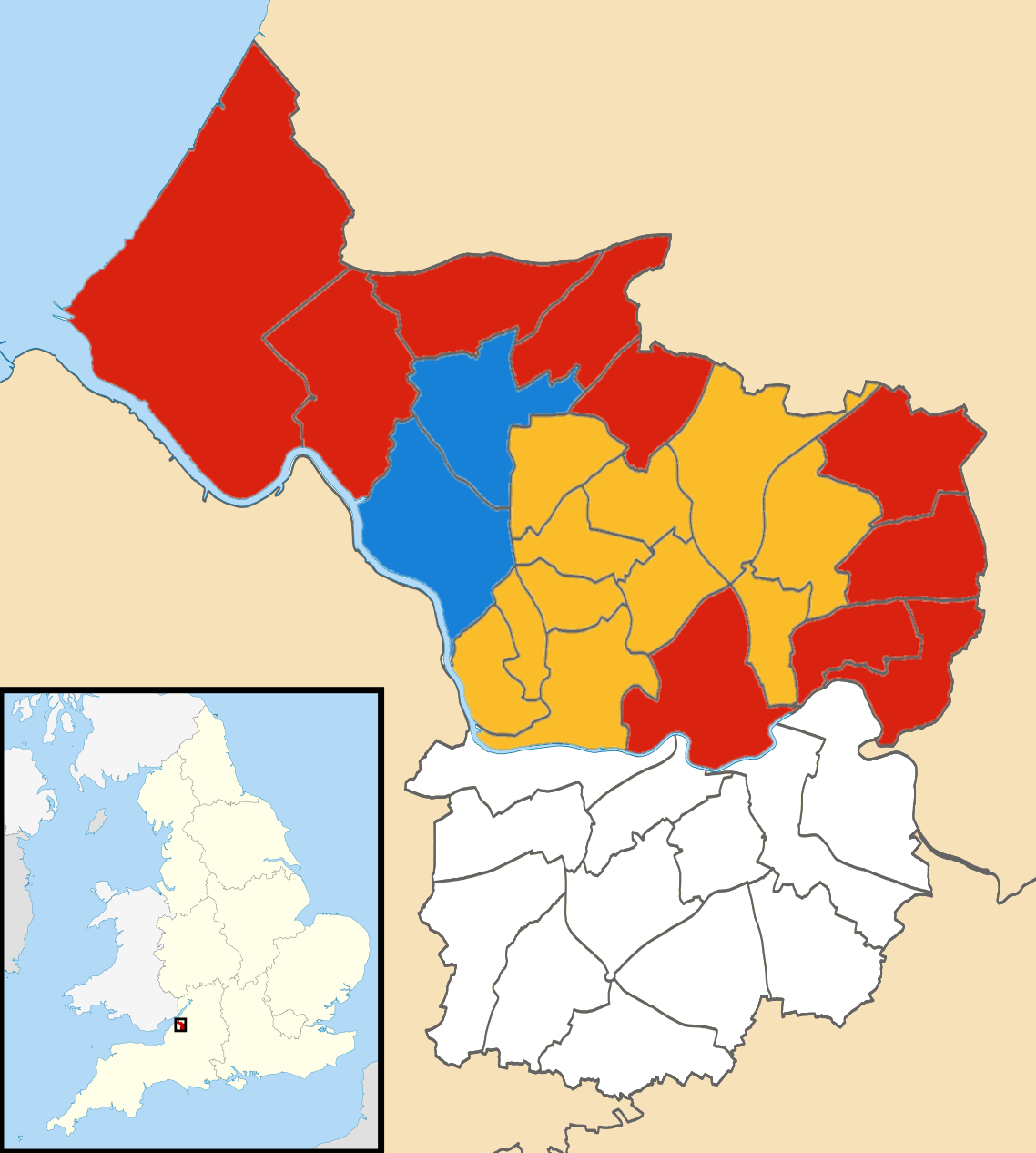
2005 results map

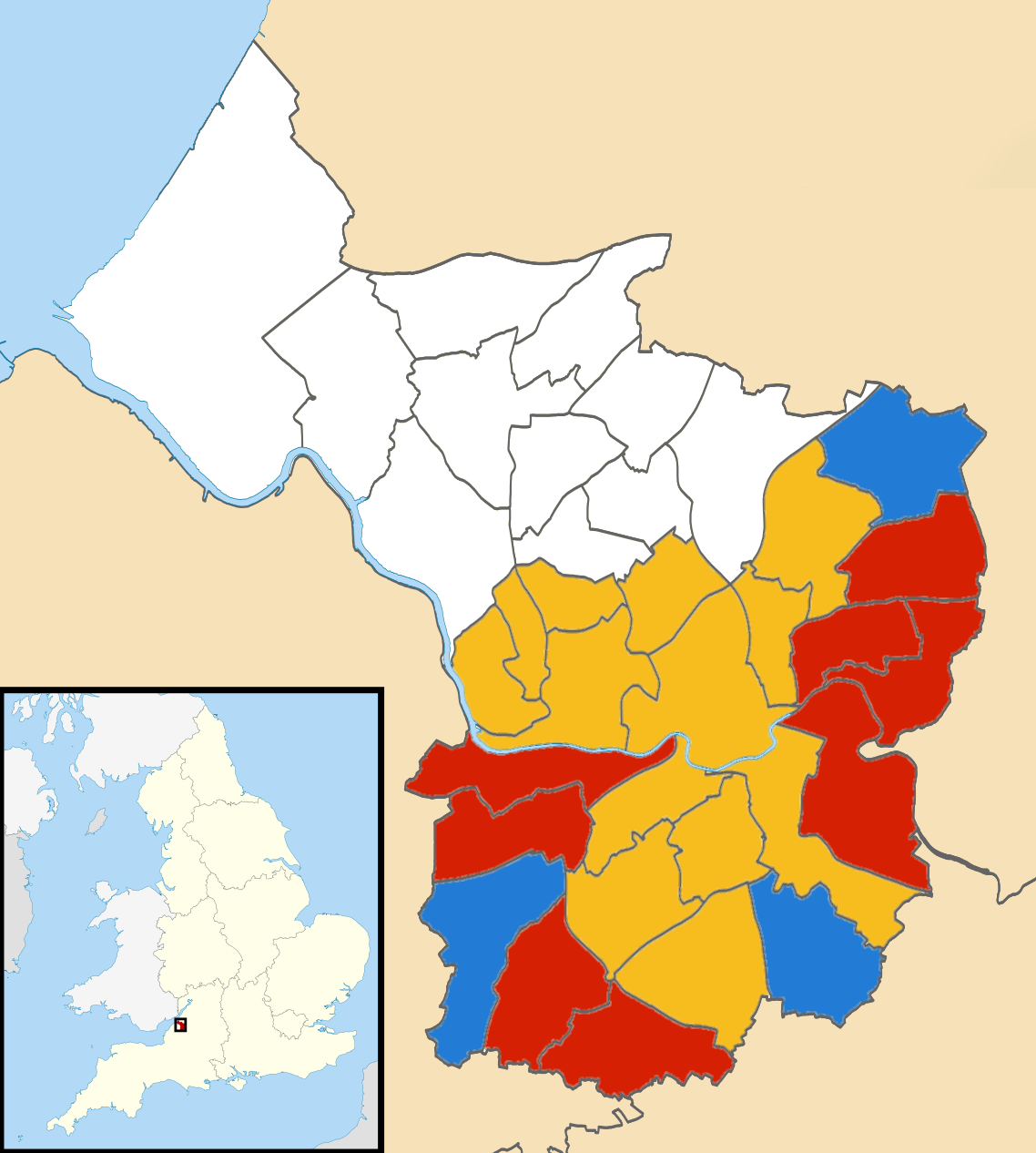
2003 results map

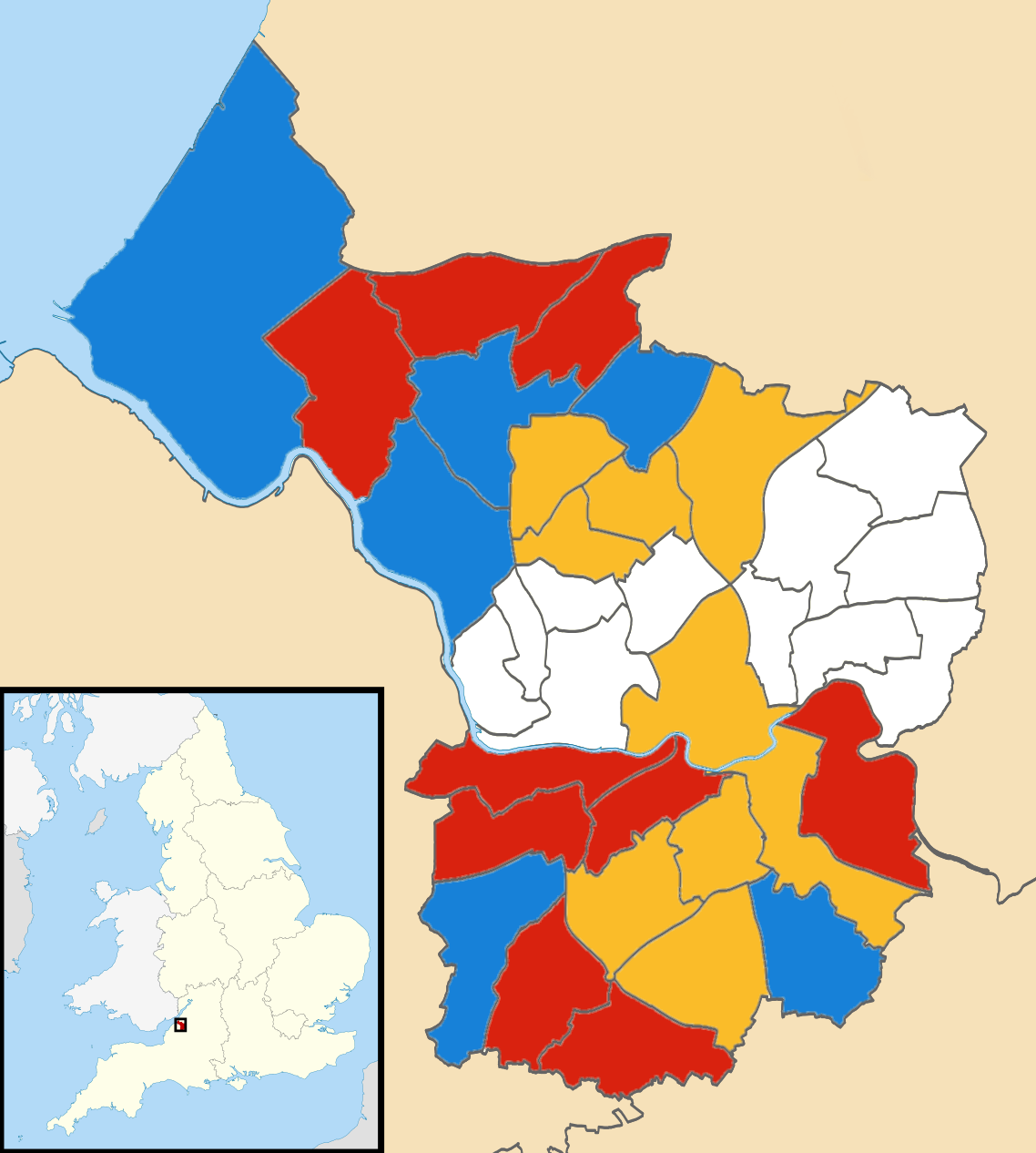
2002 results map

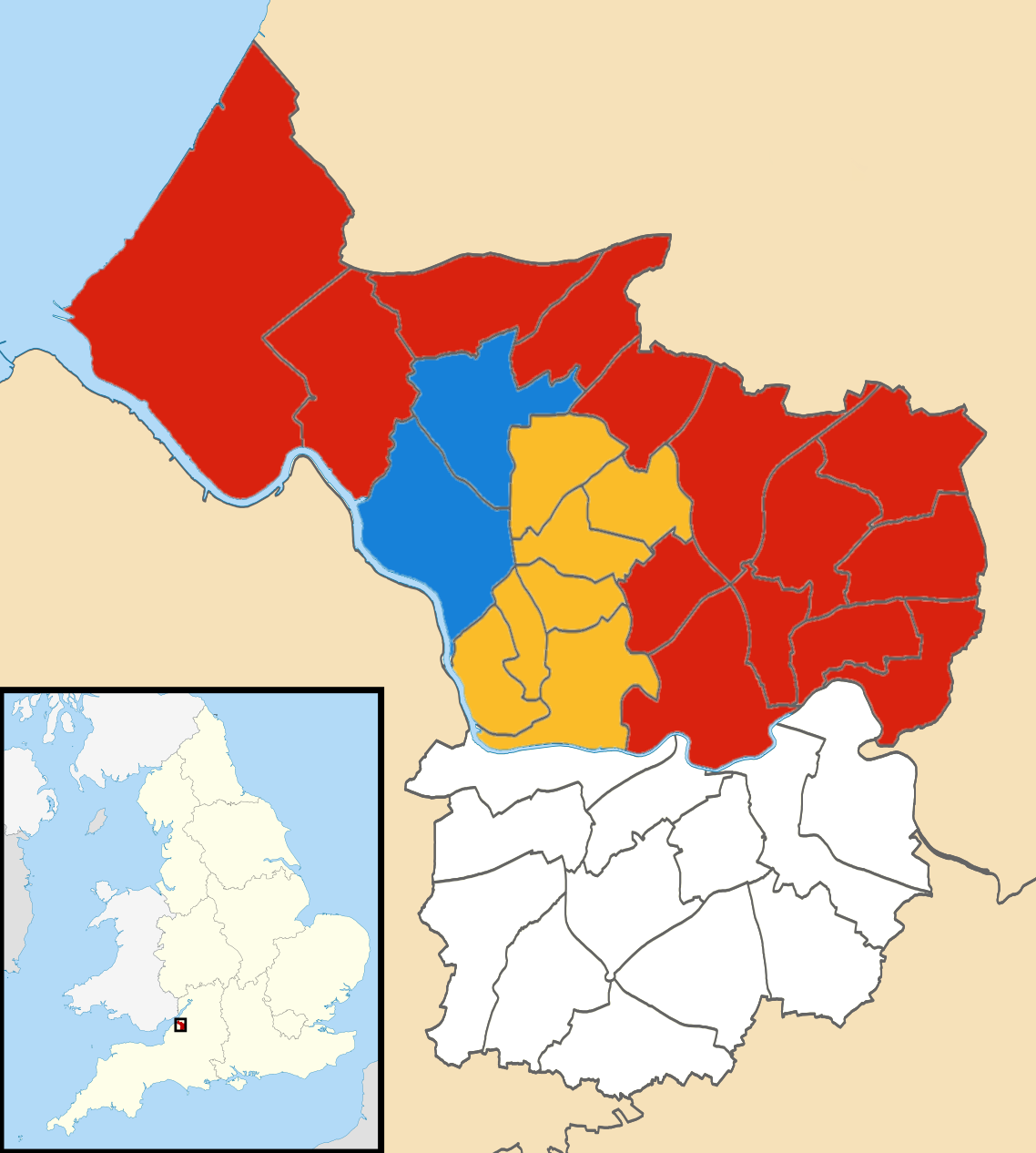
2001 results map

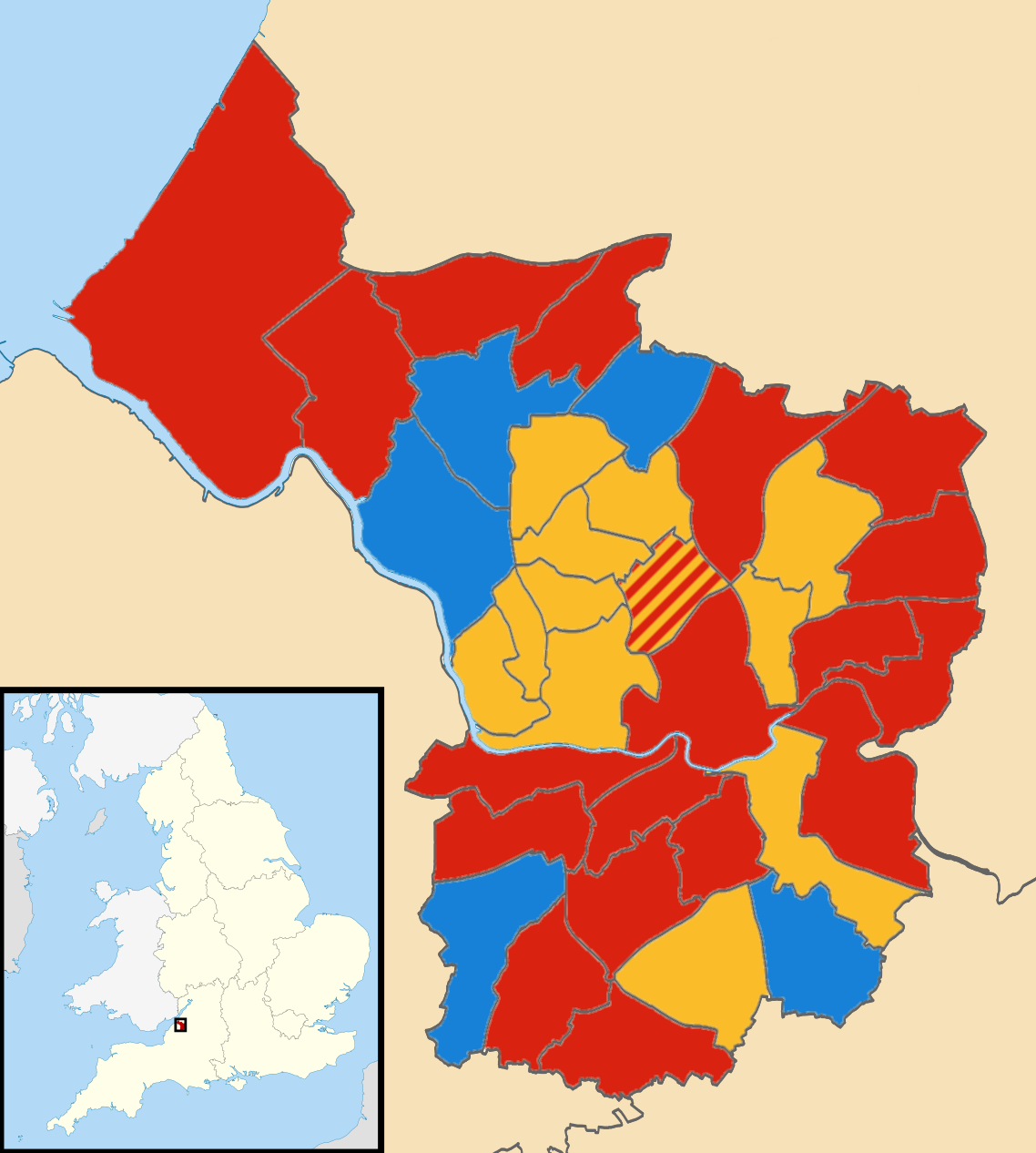
1999 results map

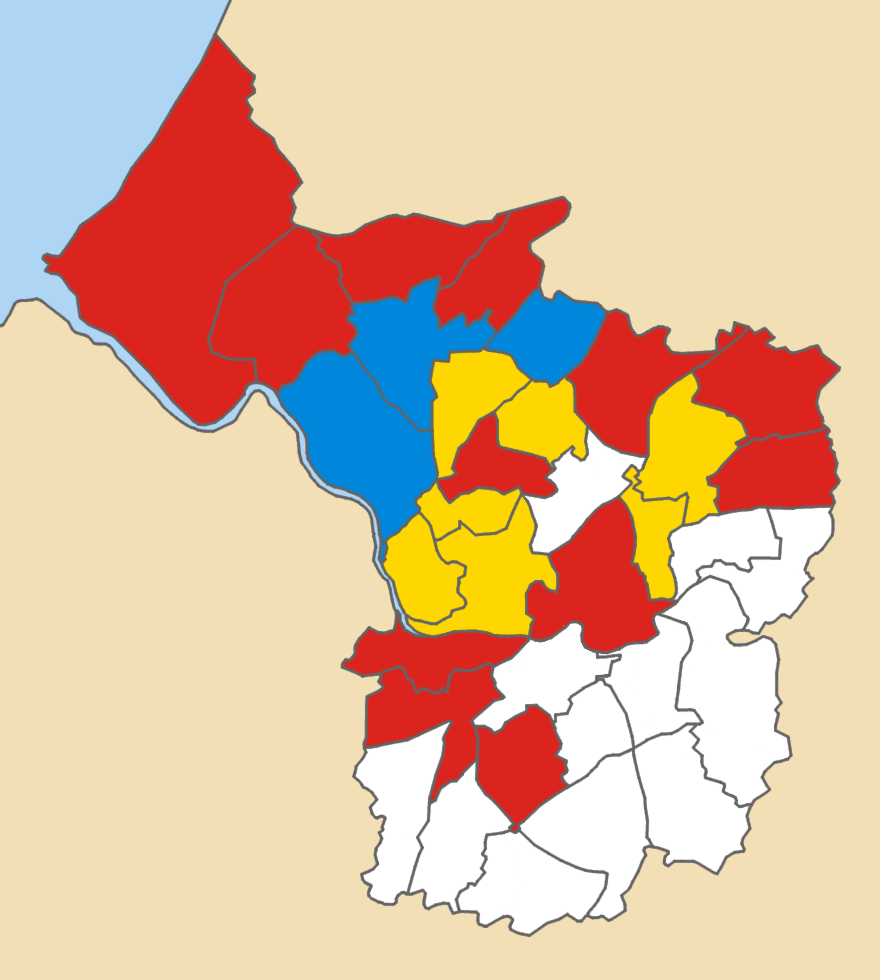
1998 results map

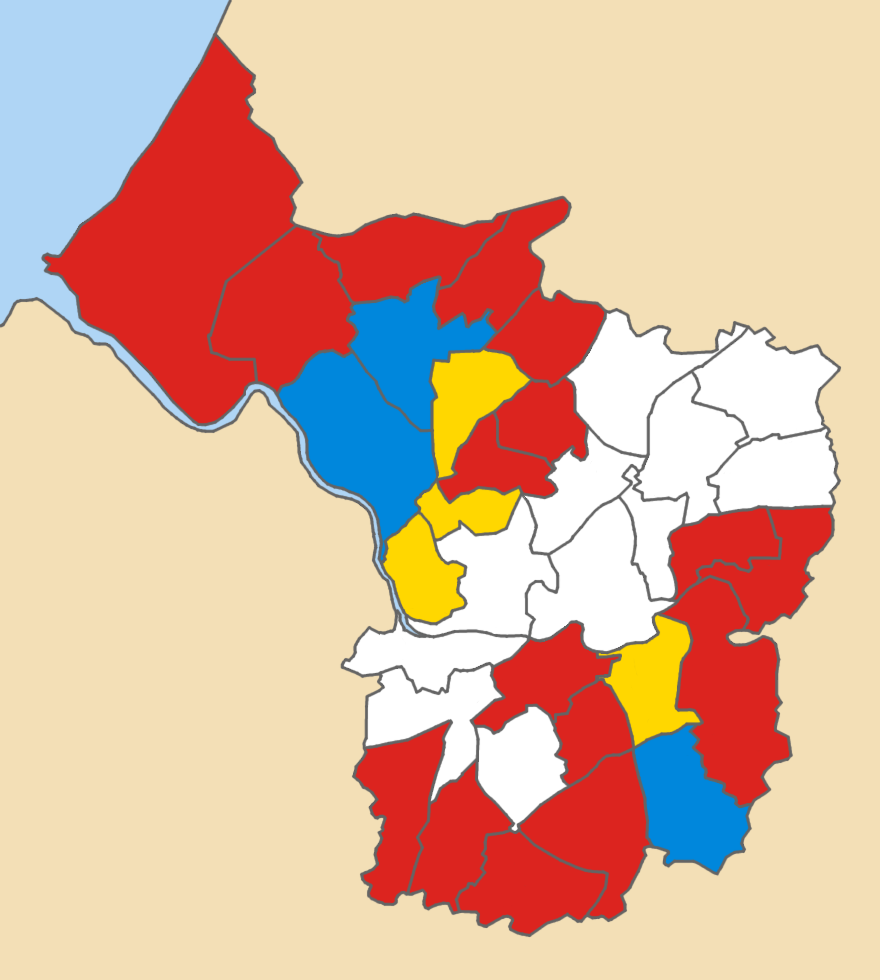
1997 results map

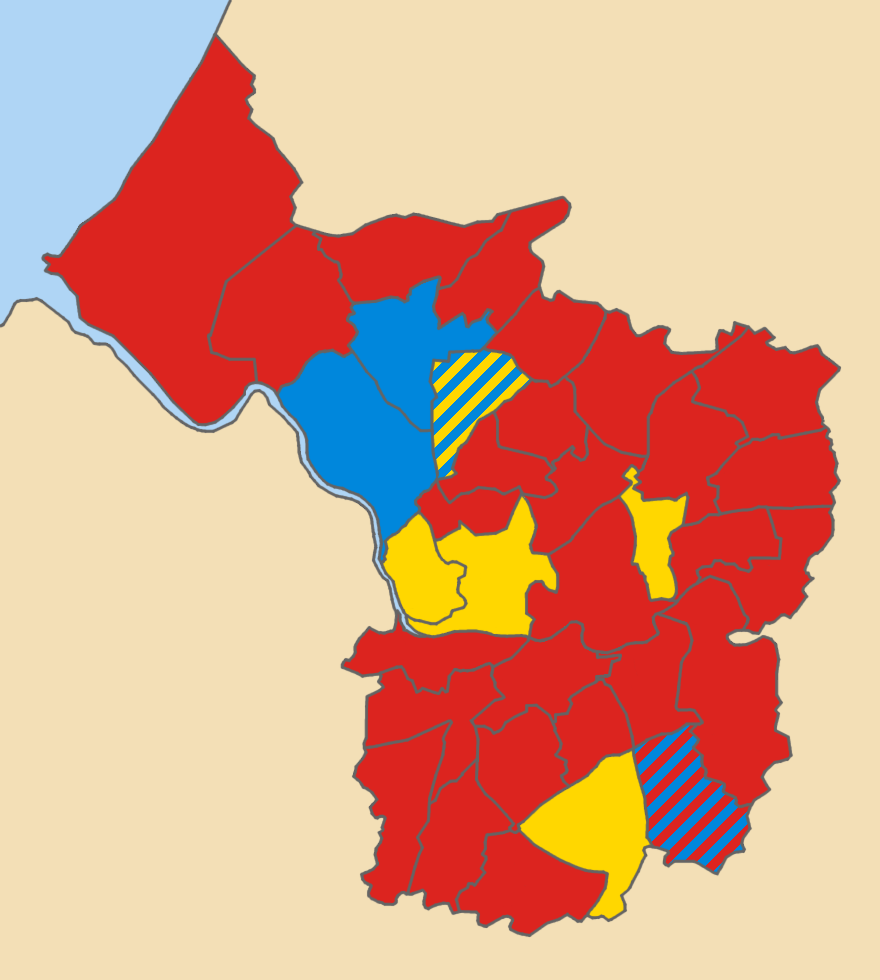
1995 results map

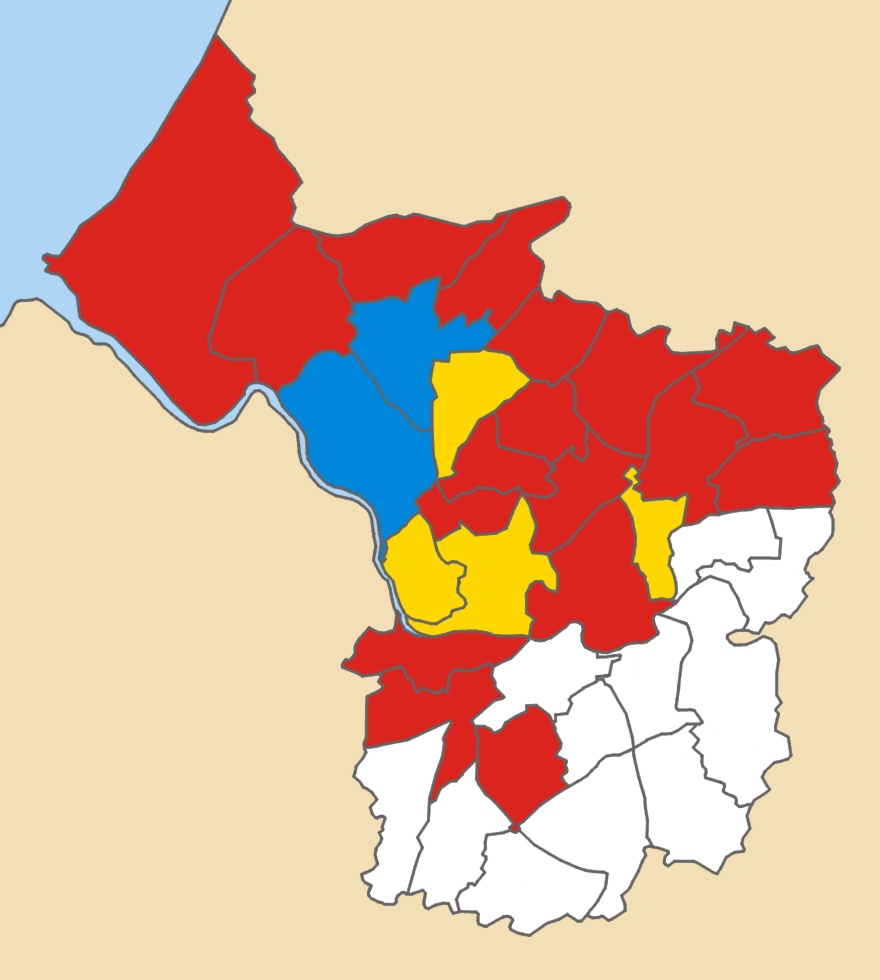
1994 results map

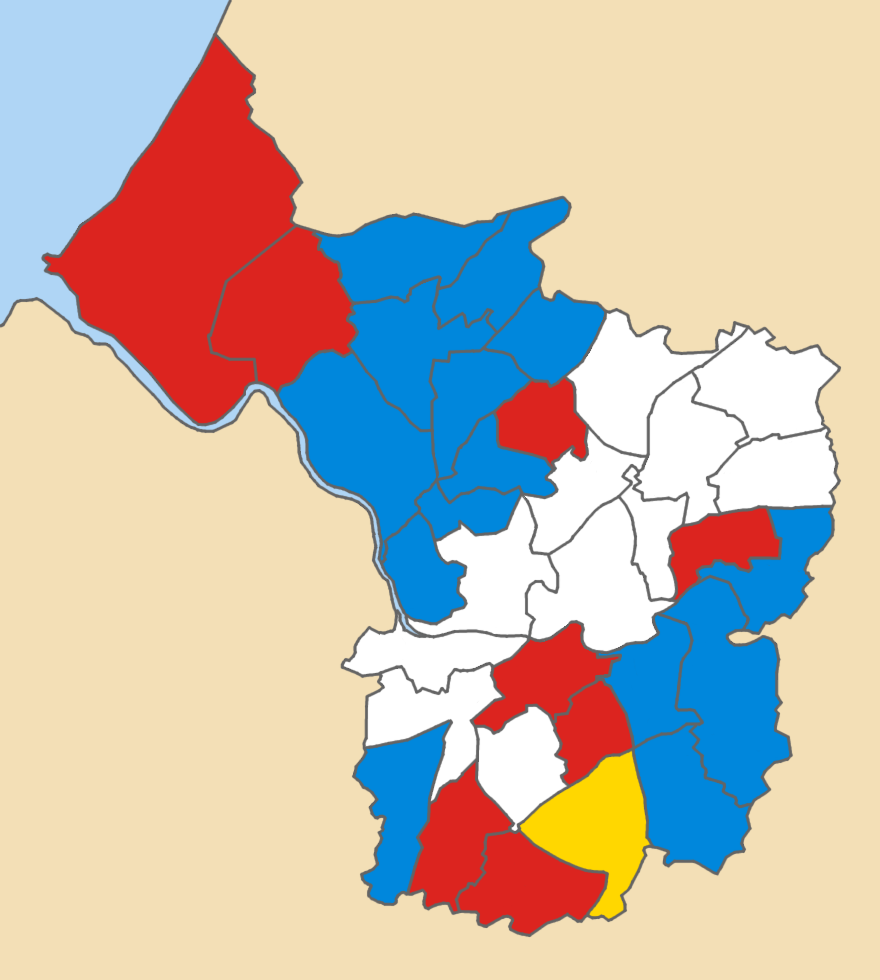
1992 results map

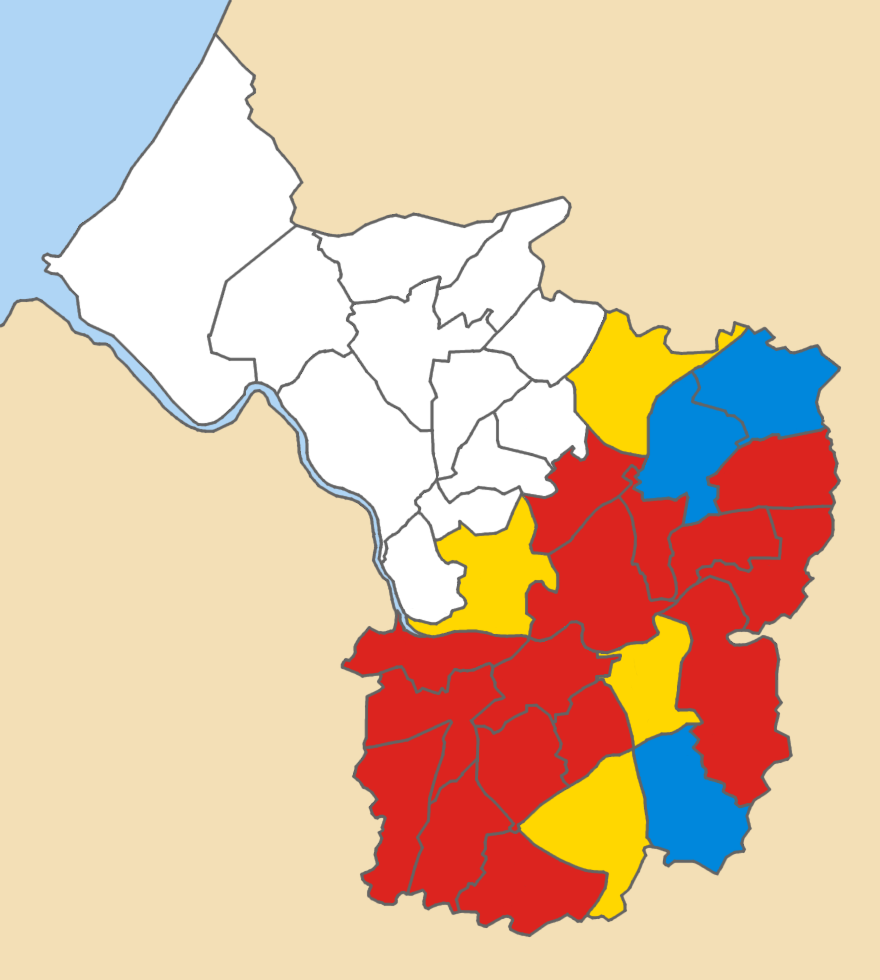
1991 results map

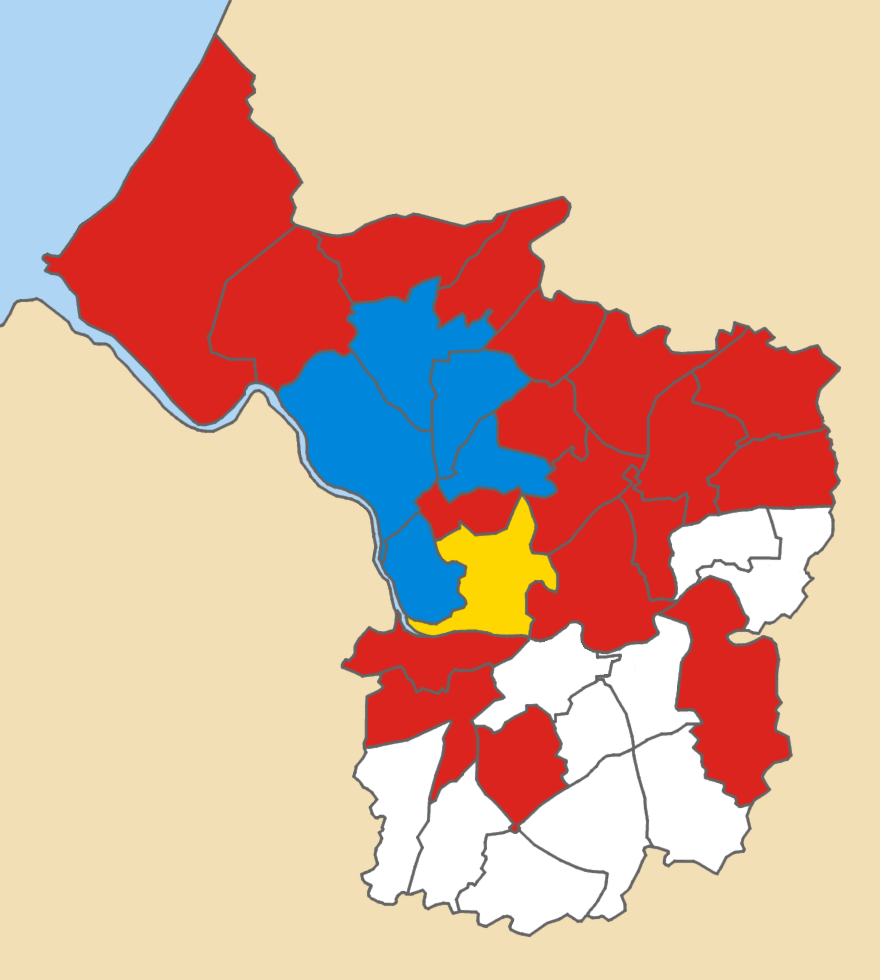
1990 results map

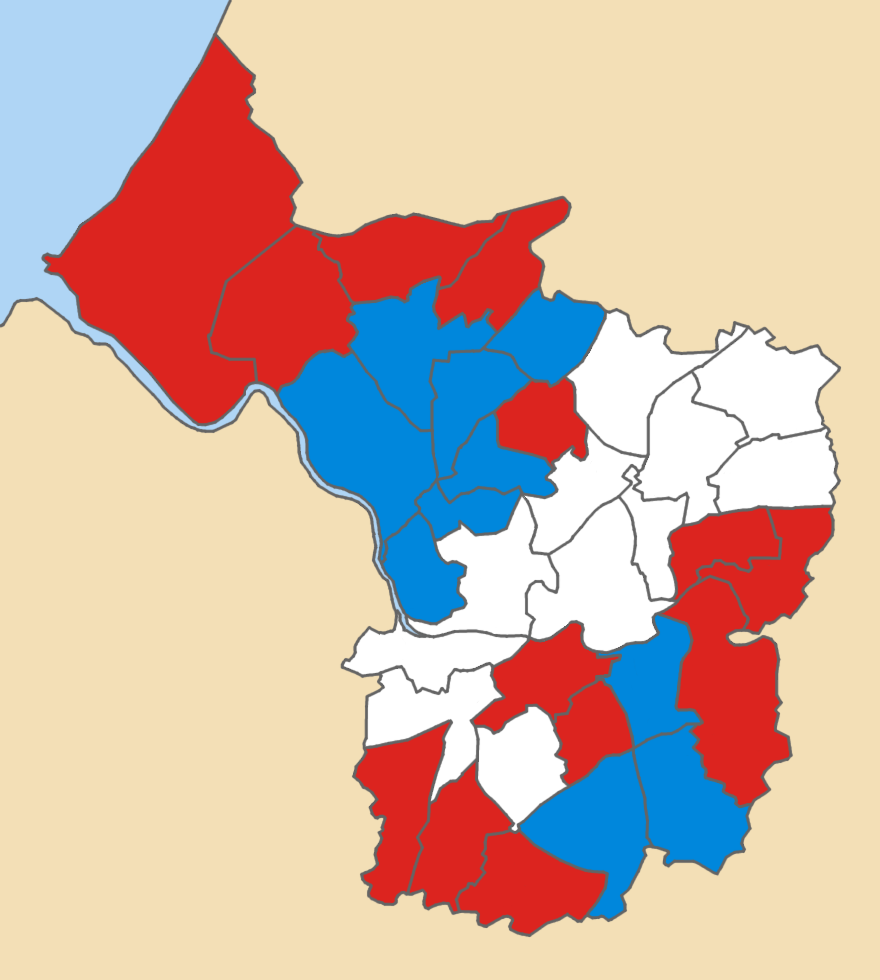
1988 results map

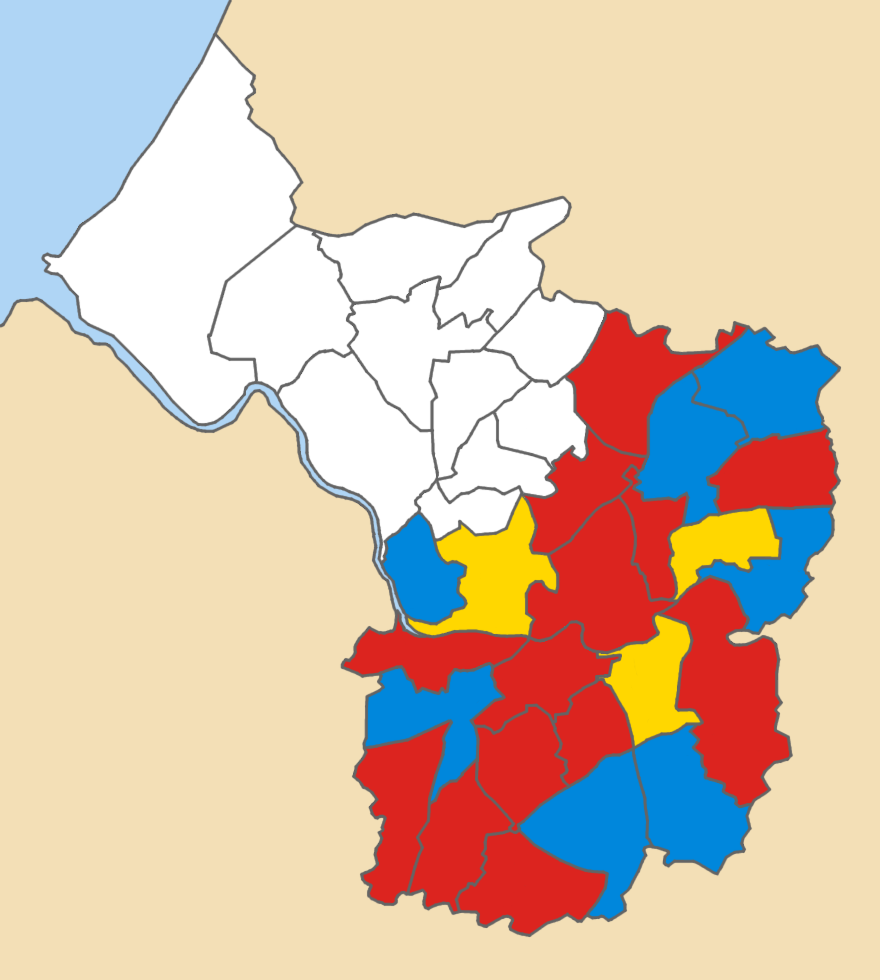
1987 results map

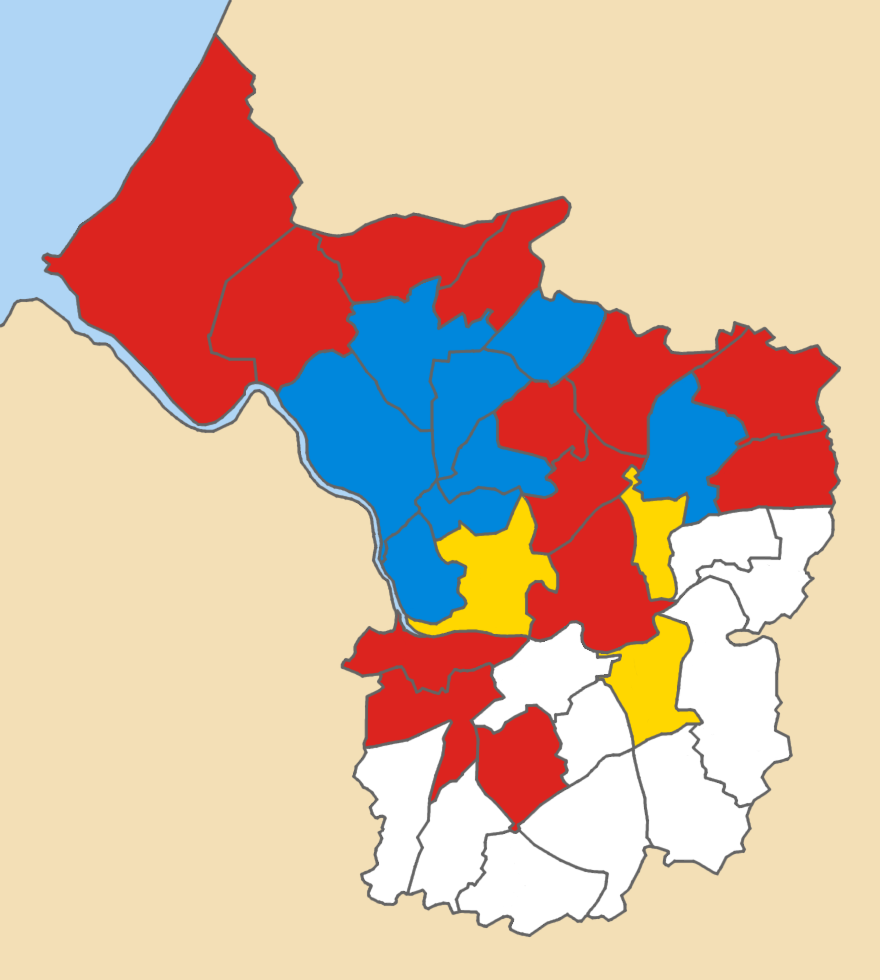
1986 results map

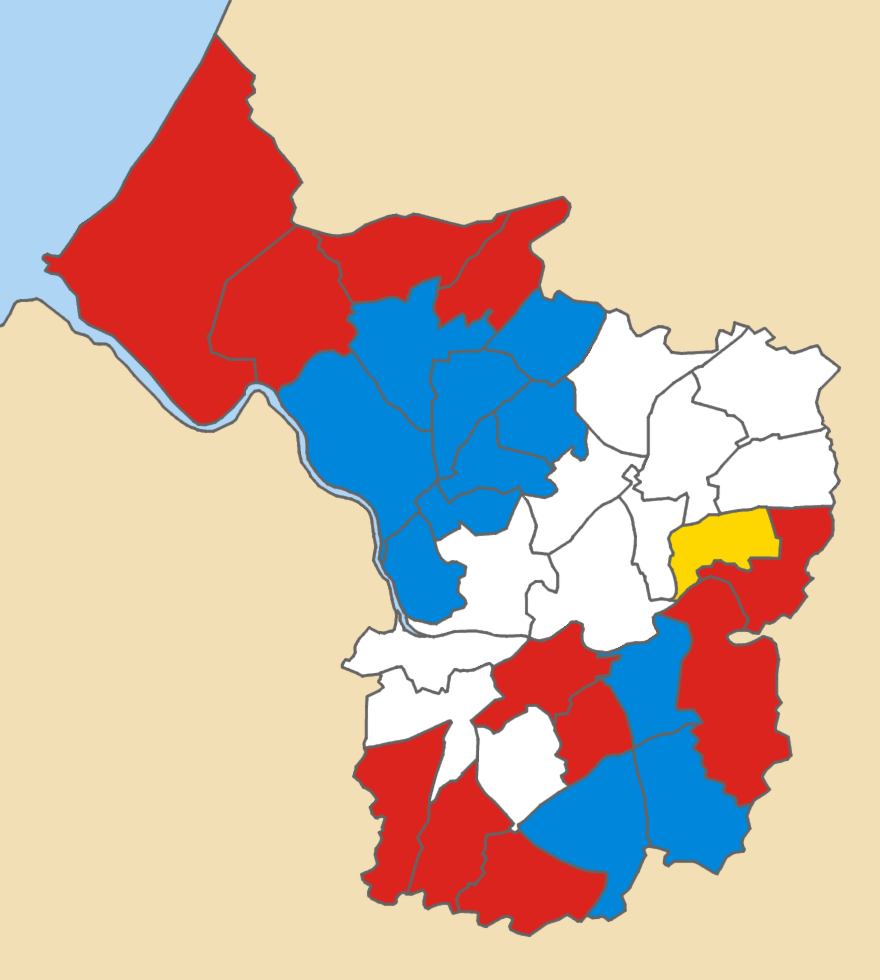
1984 results map

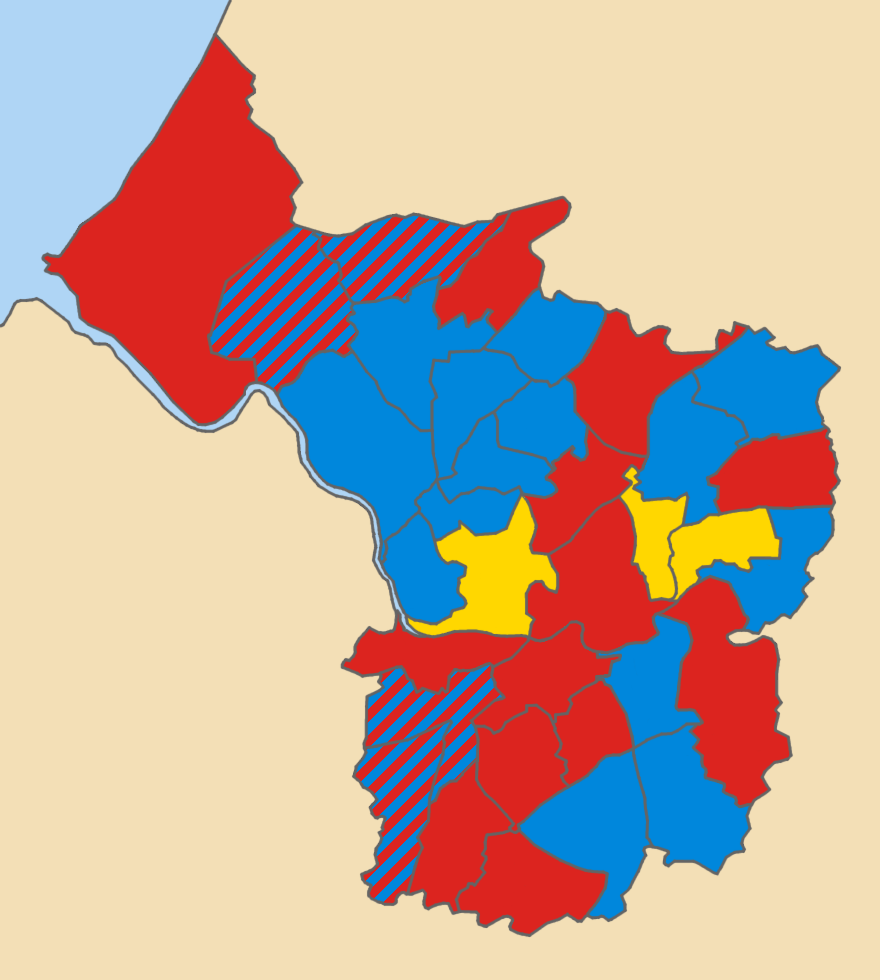
1983 results map

== See also ==
- Bristol City Council
- Bristol City Council elections
- Politics of Bristol
