= 2010 Bristol City Council election =

2010 UK local government election

- 6 May 2010

23 of 70 seats (One Third) to Bristol City Council 36 seats needed for a majority
	First party	Second party	Third party
Party	Liberal Democrats	Labour	Conservative
Seats won	38	17	14
Seat change	▲2	▲1	▼3
Popular vote	44,435	34,731	35,283
Percentage	34.28%	26.79%	27.22%
Swing	▼0.73%	▲7.91%	▲1.2%
	Fourth party
Party	Green
Seats won	1
Seat change	Steady
Popular vote	10,280
Percentage	7.93%
Swing	▼6.38%
Council control before election
Liberal Democrats
Council control after election
Liberal Democrats

Bristol City Council elections, 2010.

The 2010 Bristol City Council elections were held on Thursday 6 May 2010, for 23 seats, that being one third of the total number of councillors. The Liberal Democrats, who had won overall control of the council in 2009, increased their majority to six seats.

The Liberal Democrats were defending 9 seats, the Labour Party 4 and the Conservatives 8.

The party standings following the election:

Party	2009 cllrs	Net gain/loss	2010 cllrs
Conservative	17	-3	14
Green	1	-	1
Labour	16	+1	17
Liberal Democrats	36	+2	38
Total	70	-	70

== Ward results ==
Bristol Council composition following the 2010 local elections

=== Avonmouth ===
Bristol City Council elections: Avonmouth Ward 2010
Party	Candidate	Votes	%	±%
Labour	Doug Naysmith	1,879	32.70	+4.79
Conservative	Spud Murphy	1,878	32.68	−1.92
Liberal Democrats	Ian Humphrey Campion-Smith	1,280	22.28	+11.63
BNP	Philip Brimson	330	5.74	−5.36
English Democrat	Craig Stuart Clarke	224	3.90	−4.80
Green	Geoff Collard	155	2.70	−4.34
Majority		1	0.02	−6.67
Labour gain from Conservative		Swing	+3.36	

=== Bedminster ===
Bristol City Council elections: Bedminster Ward 2010
Party	Candidate	Votes	%	±%
Labour	Mark Bradshaw	2,129	32.72	−5.78
Liberal Democrats	Ian Robert Cooper	1,903	29.25	+18.79
Conservative	Doug Newton	1,410	21.67	−9.07
Green	Cath Slade	625	9.61	−10.69
BNP	William George Taylor	251	3.86	N/A
Independent	Pip Sheard	189	2.90	N/A
Majority		226	3.47	−4.29
Labour hold		Swing	-12.29	

=== Bishopston ===
Bristol City Council elections: Bishopston Ward 2010
Party	Candidate	Votes	%	±%
Liberal Democrats	David John Willingham	3,809	51.38	−0.64
Labour	David Ian Jepson	1,548	20.88	+6.33
Green	Graham Woodruff	1,070	14.43	−7.91
Conservative	Cath Slade	987	13.31	+2.22
Majority		2261	30.50	+0.82
Liberal Democrats hold		Swing	-3.49	

=== Bishopsworth ===
Bristol City Council elections: Bishopsworth Ward 2010
Party	Candidate	Votes	%	±%
Conservative	Kevin Michael Quartley	1,965	40.32	−17.57
Labour	Darren Eurwyn Lewis	1,667	34.21	+10.75
Liberal Democrats	Roger Graham Norman	873	17.92	+11.74
Green	Barrie Robert Lewis	368	7.55	+1.37
Majority		298	6.11	−28.32
Conservative hold		Swing	-14.16	

=== Brislington East ===
Bristol City Council elections: Brislington East Ward 2010
Party	Candidate	Votes	%	±%
Labour	Mike Wollacott	1,793	32.35	−9.75
Conservative	Barbara Madeleine Lewis	1,746	31.50	−7.76
Liberal Democrats	Pauline Mary Allen	1,304	23.53	+13.96
BNP	Chris Stocks	453	8.17	N/A
Green	Lucy Mary MacKilligin	246	4.44	−4.63
Majority		47	0.85	−1.99
Labour gain from Conservative		Swing	-0.10	

=== Brislington West ===
Bristol City Council elections: Brislington West Ward 2010
Party	Candidate	Votes	%	±%
Liberal Democrats	Peter Henry Main	2,141	37.81	−3.71
Conservative	Colin Robert Bretherton	1,404	24.80	−4.33
Labour	Liam McDonough	1,360	24.02	+10.95
BNP	Christine Margaret Ogden	412	7.28	N/A
Green	James Graham Field	345	6.09	−10.19
Majority		737	13.01	+0.62
Liberal Democrats hold		Swing	+0.31	

=== Filwood ===
Bristol City Council elections: Filwood Ward 2010
Party	Candidate	Votes	%	±%
Labour	Christopher David Jackson	2,003	52.70	−14.53
Conservative	Sylvia Christine Windows	633	16.65	+2.09
Liberal Democrats	Joel Sudworth	619	16.29	+5.78
BNP	Michael John Hamblin	320	8.42	N/A
Green	Graham Hugh Davey	121	3.18	−4.51
English Democrat	Toby Daniel Hector	105	2.76	N/A
Majority		1370	36.05	−16.62
Labour hold		Swing	-8.31	

=== Hartcliffe ===
Bristol City Council elections: Hartcliffe Ward 2010
Party	Candidate	Votes	%	±%
Labour	Derek Stephen Pickup	1,728	38.93	−11.59
Conservative	Nicki Crandon	1,198	26.99	−12.11
Liberal Democrats	Lorraine Horgan	998	22.48	+16.69
BNP	Steve McKeown	377	8.49	N/A
Green	Patrick Slade	138	3.11	−1.48
Majority		530	11.94	+0.52
Labour hold		Swing	+0.26	

=== Henbury ===
Bristol City Council elections: Henbury Ward 2010
Party	Candidate	Votes	%	±%
Conservative	Mark David Roscoe Weston	1,713	34.94	−5.70
Labour	Terence Robert Cook	1,584	32.31	+3.13
Liberal Democrats	Mj Barakat	1,253	25.56	13.77
English Democrat	Ray Carr	199	4.06	−6.69
Green	Justin Michael Quinnell	153	3.12	−4.52
Majority		129	2.63	−8.83
Conservative hold		Swing	-4.42	

=== Hengrove ===
Bristol City Council elections: Hengrove Ward 2010
Party	Candidate	Votes	%	±%
Liberal Democrats	Sylvia Doubell	2,164	38.62	+2.21
Conservative	Adam Beda Tayler	1,644	29.34	−6.15
Labour	Barry Clark	1,628	29.05	+7.05
Green	Roy Gallop	168	3.00	−3.10
Majority		520	9.28	+8.31
Liberal Democrats hold		Swing	+4.18	

=== Henleaze ===
Bristol City Council elections: Henleaze Ward 2010
Party	Candidate	Votes	%	±%
Liberal Democrats	Clare Campion-Smith	2,971	44.60	+2.08
Conservative	Liz Radford	2,726	40.92	+0.13
Labour	Judith Mary Sluglett	692	10.39	+2.60
Green	Hannah Michelle Jefferys	272	4.08	−4.82
Majority		245	3.68	−1.95
Liberal Democrats hold		Swing	+0.98	

=== Horfield ===
Bristol City Council elections: Horfield Ward 2010
Party	Candidate	Votes	%	±%
Liberal Democrats	Peter John Revel Levy	2,432	39.62	−2.34
Conservative	Nick Lane	1,775	28.91	−1.22
Labour	Peter John Kennedy-Chapman	1,353	22.04	+5.10
Green	Jude English	371	6.04	−1.39
BNP	Freya Doreen Cook	208	3.39	−0.14
Majority		657	10.71	−1.12
Liberal Democrats gain from Conservative		Swing	-0.56	

=== Kingsweston ===
Bristol City Council elections: Kingsweston Ward 2010
Party	Candidate	Votes	%	±%
Liberal Democrats	Tim Leaman	1,659	35.16	−12.11
Labour	John Thomas Bees	1,427	30.24	+11.61
Conservative	Adrian Peter Clarke	1,195	25.32	+2.73
Independent	Terence Richard Daniel Thomas	263	5.57	N/A
Green	Jackie Hearn	175	3.71	−7.80
Majority		232	4.92	−19.76
Liberal Democrats gain from Labour		Swing	-11.86	

=== Knowle ===
Bristol City Council elections: Knowle Ward 2010
Party	Candidate	Votes	%	±%
Liberal Democrats	Gary Hopkins	2,688	48.49	+3.08
Labour	Gwyneth Ann Brain	1,354	24.43	+2.86
Conservative	Tony Lee	842	15.19	−2.21
Green	Glenn Royston Vowles	385	6.95	−8.67
BNP	Colin Richard Chidsey	274	4.94	N/A
Majority		1334	24.06	+0.22
Liberal Democrats hold		Swing	+0.11	

=== Lockleaze ===
Bristol City Council elections: Lockleaze Ward 2010
Party	Candidate	Votes	%	±%
Liberal Democrats	Sean Clifford Emmett	1,920	39.74	+3.20
Labour	Thomas Newman	1,551	32.10	+11.67
Conservative	Philip Charles Pomeroy-Hutton	814	16.85	+4.62
BNP	John Hooper	216	4.47	−3.84
Green	Christina Mary Quinnell	214	4.43	−3.13
English Democrat	Jon Baker	117	2.42	N/A
Majority		369	7.64	−8.47
Liberal Democrats hold		Swing	-4.24	

=== Redland ===
Bristol City Council elections: Redland Ward 2010
Party	Candidate	Votes	%	±%
Liberal Democrats	Sylvia Jeanne Townsend	3,000	44.64	+6.41
Conservative	Graham Roger Godwin-Pearson	1,444	21.48	−1.28
Green	Robert James Alexander Triggs	1,243	18.49	−6.95
Labour	Helen Frances Sproates	1,034	15.38	−1.80
Majority		1556	23.16	+10.37
Liberal Democrats hold		Swing	+3.85	

=== Southmead ===
Bristol City Council elections: Southmead Ward 2010
Party	Candidate	Votes	%	±%
Labour	Jenny Smith	1,921	40.44	+9.09
Liberal Democrats	Barry John Cash	1,291	27.18	−4.95
Conservative	Becky Cotton	984	20.72	+1.86
BNP	Lynn Cook	310	6.53	N/A
Green	Lela Helen McTernan	124	2.61	−3.60
English Democrat	Mike Blundell	120	2.53	−8.92
Majority		630	13.26	+12.48
Labour hold		Swing	+7.02	

=== Southville ===
Bristol City Council elections: Southville Ward 2010
Party	Candidate	Votes	%	±%
Green	Tess Green	2,150	33.83	−6.13
Labour	Barbara Norma Brown	1,892	29.77	−10.36
Liberal Democrats	Lena Clare Wright	1,606	25.27	+19.37
Conservative	Paul Francis Smith	707	11.13	+2.06
Majority		258	4.06	+3.89
Green hold		Swing	+2.12	

=== Stockwood ===
Bristol City Council elections: Stockwood Ward 2010
Party	Candidate	Votes	%	±%
Conservative	David Henry Robert Morris	2,310	41.43	−9.05
Labour	Mike Langley	1,487	26.67	+7.24
Liberal Democrats	Michael Alan Goulden	1,367	24.52	14.91
Green	Peter Antony Goodwin	412	7.39	−13.1
Majority		823	14.76	−15.23
Conservative hold		Swing	-8.15	

=== Stoke Bishop ===
Bristol City Council elections: Stoke Bishop Ward 2010
Party	Candidate	Votes	%	±%
Conservative	John Goulandris	3,426	55.98	−2.88
Liberal Democrats	Mark James	1,736	28.37	+5.04
Labour	Jasvant Singh Badesha	595	9.72	+2.10
Green	Keith Vivian Wiltshire	363	5.93	−4.26
Majority		1690	27.61	−7.92
Conservative hold		Swing	-3.96	

=== Westbury-on-Trym ===
Bristol City Council elections: Westbury-on-Trym Ward 2010
Party	Candidate	Votes	%	±%
Conservative	Alastair Peter Lindsay Watson	3,124	46.69	−5.15
Liberal Democrats	Graham Christopher Donald	2,280	34.08	+5.05
Labour	Claire Louise Cook	790	11.81	+4.99
Green	Alex Dunn	407	6.08	−2.74
English Democrat	Stephen Michael Wright	90	1.35	−2.14
Majority		844	12.61	−10.20
Conservative hold		Swing	-5.10	

=== Whitchurch Park ===
Bristol City Council elections: Whitchurch Park Ward 2010
Party	Candidate	Votes	%	±%
Liberal Democrats	Tim Kent	1,857	39.38	+10.88
Labour	Ed Bramall	1,798	38.13	−5.93
Conservative	Jenny Rogers	699	14.82	+4.80
BNP	Michael John Carey	277	5.87	−7.58
Green	Barney Smith	85	1.80	−2.17
Majority		59	1.25	−14.31
Liberal Democrats hold		Swing	+8.41	

=== Windmill Hill ===
Bristol City Council elections: Windmill Hill Ward 2010
Party	Candidate	Votes	%	±%
Liberal Democrats	Alf Havvock	3,284	51.83	+7.37
Labour	Tobin Liam James Webb	1,518	23.96	−0.03
Green	Stephen Petter	700	11.05	−7.72
Conservative	Graham David Morris	659	10.40	+1.70
BNP	Ronald Colston George	175	2.76	N/A
Majority		1766	27.87	+7.40
Liberal Democrats hold		Swing	+3.7	

== See also ==
- Politics of Bristol
- 2010 United Kingdom local elections
