= 2009 Bristol City Council election =

2009 UK local government election

- 4 May 2009

23 of 70 seats (One Third) to Bristol City Council 36 seats needed for a majority
| | First party | Second party | Third party |
|---|---|---|---|
| Party | Liberal Democrats | Conservative | Labour |
| Seats won | 36 | 17 | 16 |
| Seat change | ▲4 | ▲4 | ▼8 |
| | Fourth party |
| Party | Green |
| Seats won | 1 |
| Seat change | Steady |
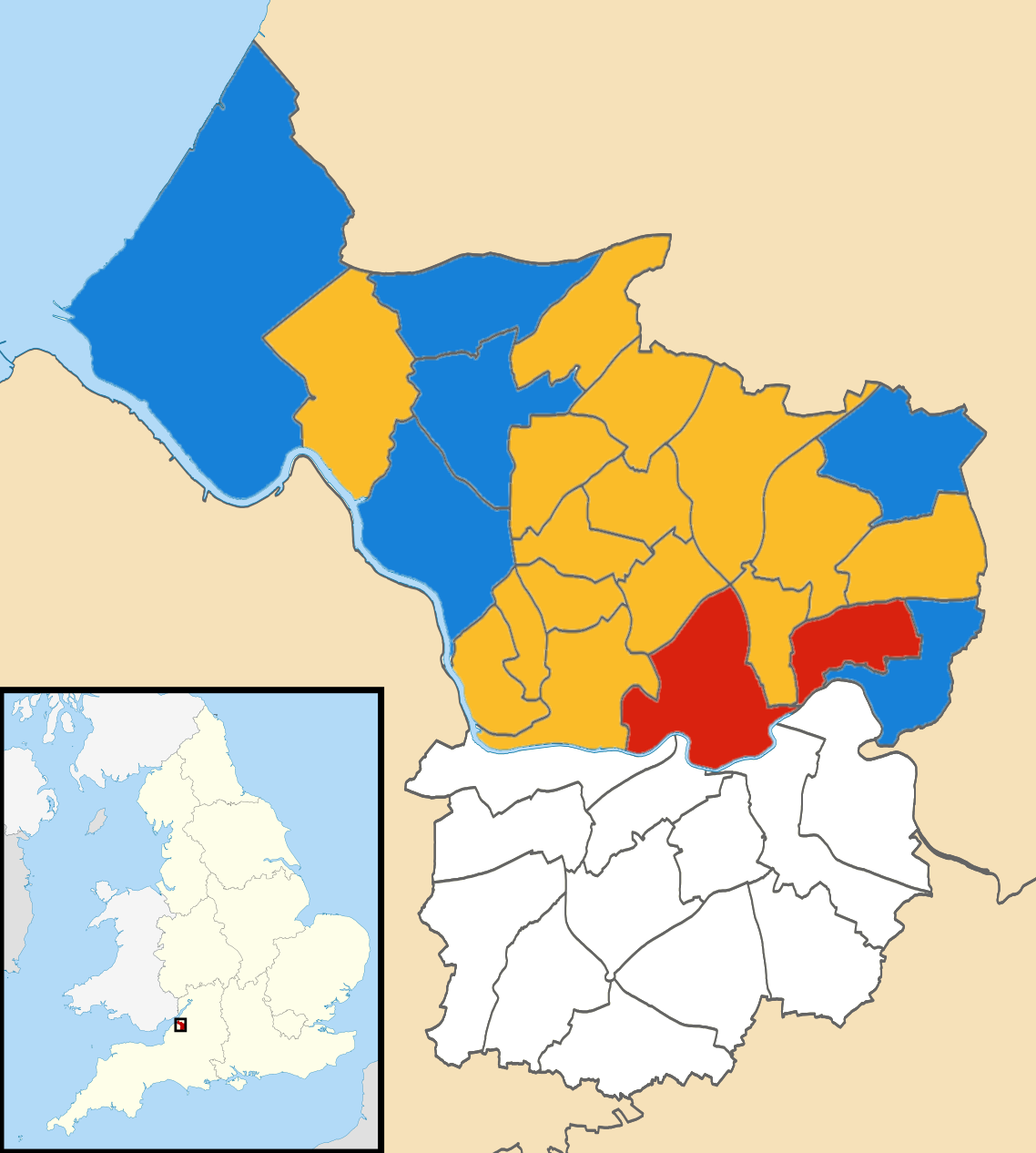
- 2009 local election results in Bristol
Council control before election
No Overall Control
Council control after election
Liberal Democrats

The 2009 Bristol City Council elections were held on Thursday 4 June 2009, for 23 seats, that being one-third of the total number of councilors. The Liberal Democrats who had been leading a minority administration, won an overall majority of the council, the first time the party had achieved this on Bristol City Council. The Liberal Democrats were defending 11 seats, the Labour Party 10 and the Conservatives 2.

These seats were last contested in 2005.

== Summary ==
| Party | 2007 Cllrs | Gain/Loss | 2009 Cllrs |
|---|---|---|---|
| Conservative | 13 | ▲4 | 17 |
| Labour | 24 | ▼8 | 16 |
| Liberal Democrats | 32 | ▲4 | 36 |
| Green | 1 | - | 1 |
| Total | 70 | - | 70 |

== Ward results ==
Bristol City Council composition following the 2009 local electionl

=== Ashley ===
Bristol City Council Elections: Ashley Ward 2009
| Party | Candidate | Votes | % |
|---|---|---|---|
| Liberal Democrats | Jon Charles Rogers | 1,978 | 47.84 |
| Green | Daniella Elsa Radice | 1,283 | 31.03 |
| Labour | Mazhar Iqbal | 542 | 13.11 |
| Respect | Jo Benefield | 167 | 4.04 |
| Conservative | Marian Ena Ovonlen | 165 | 3.99 |
| Majority | | 695 | 16.81 |
| Liberal Democrats hold | | | |

=== Avonmouth ===
Bristol City Council Elections: Avonmouth Ward 2009
| Party | Candidate | Votes | % |
|---|---|---|---|
| Conservative | Siobhan Kennedy-Hall | 1,169 | 34.6 |
| Labour | Brian Peter Mead | 943 | 27.91 |
| BNP | Ron George | 375 | 11.10 |
| Liberal Democrats | Pauline Mary Allen | 360 | 10.65 |
| English Democrat | Stephen Michael Wright | 294 | 8.7 |
| Green | Justin Michael Quinnell | 238 | 7.04 |
| Majority | | 226 | 6.69 |
| Conservative gain from Labour | | | |

=== Bishopston ===
Bristol City Council Elections: Bishopston Ward 2009
| Party | Candidate | Votes | % |
|---|---|---|---|
| Liberal Democrats | Bev Knott | 2,210 | 52.02 |
| Green | Martin Harvey | 949 | 22.34 |
| Labour | David Ian Jepson | 618 | 14.55 |
| Conservative | Richard Jonathan Zaltman | 471 | 11.09 |
| Majority | | 1261 | 29.68 |
| Liberal Democrats hold | | | |

=== Cabot ===
Bristol City Council Elections: Cabot Ward 2009
| Party | Candidate | Votes | % |
|---|---|---|---|
| Liberal Democrats | Mark Michael Wright | 1,259 | 47.62 |
| Green | Donald Brown | 567 | 21.44 |
| Conservative | Adam Beda Tayler | 451 | 17.06 |
| Labour | Rebecca Gordge | 367 | 13.88 |
| Majority | | 692 | 26.18 |
| Liberal Democrats hold | | | |

=== Clifton ===
Bristol City Council Elections: Clifton Ward 2009
| Party | Candidate | Votes | % |
|---|---|---|---|
| Liberal Democrats | Trevor John Blythe | 1,340 | 42.46 |
| Conservative | Harriet Alice Ann Levett | 858 | 27.19 |
| Green | Gundula Dorey | 592 | 18.76 |
| Labour | Rosemary Patricia Chamberlin | 366 | 11.60 |
| Majority | | 482 | 15.27 |
| Liberal Democrats hold | | | |

=== Clifton East ===
Bristol City Council Elections: Clifton East Ward 2009
| Party | Candidate | Votes | % |
|---|---|---|---|
| Liberal Democrats | Simon Timothy Cook | 1,321 | 47.95 |
| Conservative | Stephen Simmons | 884 | 32.09 |
| Green | John Mark Hills | 332 | 12.05 |
| Labour | Laurence David Newman | 218 | 7.91 |
| Majority | | 437 | 15.86 |
| Liberal Democrats hold | | | |

=== Cotham ===
Bristol City Council Elections: Cotham Ward 2009
| Party | Candidate | Votes | % |
|---|---|---|---|
| Liberal Democrats | Anthony Leonard Negus | 1,389 | 44.89 |
| Green | Geoff Collard | 706 | 22.82 |
| Conservative | Eleanor Louise Downey | 573 | 18.52 |
| Labour | Karin Smyth | 426 | 13.77 |
| Majority | | 683 | 22.07 |
| Liberal Democrats hold | | | |

=== Easton ===
Bristol City Council Elections: Easton Ward 2009
| Party | Candidate | Votes | % |
|---|---|---|---|
| Liberal Democrats | John Kiely | 1,290 | 35.24 |
| Labour | Mohammed Arif | 1,116 | 30.48 |
| Green | Katie Buse | 938 | 25.62 |
| Conservative | David Thomas Harrison Lewis | 220 | 6.01 |
| Respect | Mo Ouammi | 97 | 2.65 |
| Majority | | 174 | 4.76 |
| Liberal Democrats hold | | | |

=== Eastville ===
Bristol City Council Elections: Eastville Ward 2009
| Party | Candidate | Votes | % |
|---|---|---|---|
| Liberal Democrats | Steve Comer | 1,310 | 43.74 |
| Labour | Mike Wollacott | 717 | 23.94 |
| Conservative | Derek Albert Edward Fey | 542 | 18.10 |
| Green | Glenn Vowles | 426 | 14.22 |
| Majority | | 593 | 19.8 |
| Liberal Democrats hold | | | |

=== Frome Vale ===
Bristol City Council Elections: Frome Vale Ward 2009
| Party | Candidate | Votes | % |
|---|---|---|---|
| Conservative | James Andrew Hale Stevenson | 1,234 | 37.10 |
| Labour | Bill Payne | 926 | 27.84 |
| Liberal Democrats | Barry John Cash | 442 | 13.29 |
| BNP | Colin Richard Chidsey | 368 | 11.06 |
| Green | Josephine McLellan | 356 | 10.7 |
| Majority | | 308 | 9.26 |
| Conservative gain from Labour | | | |

=== Henbury ===
Bristol City Council Elections: Henbury Ward 2009
| Party | Candidate | Votes | % |
|---|---|---|---|
| Conservative | Chris Windows | 1,138 | 40.64 |
| Labour | Derek Stephen Pickup | 817 | 29.18 |
| Liberal Democrats | Christopher William Luffingham | 330 | 11.79 |
| English Democrat | Raymond Christopher Carr | 301 | 10.75 |
| Green | Nigel Pready | 214 | 7.64 |
| Majority | | 321 | 11.46 |
| Conservative gain from Labour | | | |

=== Henleaze ===
Bristol City Council Elections: Henleaze Ward 2009
| Party | Candidate | Votes | % |
|---|---|---|---|
| Liberal Democrats | Glenise Morgan | 1,786 | 42.52 |
| Conservative | Liz Radford | 1,713 | 40.79 |
| Green | Steve Meek | 374 | 8.90 |
| Labour | Judith Sluglett | 327 | 7.79 |
| Majority | | 73 | 1.73 |
| Liberal Democrats hold | | | |

=== Hillfields ===
Bristol City Council Elections: Hillfields Ward 2009
| Party | Candidate | Votes | % |
|---|---|---|---|
| Liberal Democrats | Patrick Hassell | 1,229 | 37.42 |
| Labour | Noreen Patricia Daniels | 871 | 26.52 |
| Conservative | Dave Lake | 495 | 15.07 |
| BNP | Chris Pegler | 428 | 13.03 |
| Green | Leon Roman Quinn | 261 | 7.95 |
| Majority | | 358 | 10.9 |
| Liberal Democrats gain from Labour | | | |

=== Horfield ===
Bristol City Council Elections: Horfield Ward 2009
| Party | Candidate | Votes | % |
|---|---|---|---|
| Liberal Democrats | Cheryl Ann | 1,603 | 41.96 |
| Conservative | Rowland Henry Webb | 1,151 | 30.13 |
| Labour | Rosalie Walker | 647 | 16.94 |
| Green | Jude English | 284 | 7.43 |
| BNP | Christine Margaret Ogden | 135 | 3.53 |
| Majority | | 452 | 11.83 |
| Liberal Democrats gain from Labour | | | |

=== Kingsweston ===
Bristol City Council Elections: Kingsweston Ward 2009
| Party | Candidate | Votes | % |
|---|---|---|---|
| Liberal Democrats | Simon Rayner | 1,396 | 47.27 |
| Conservative | Adrian Peter Clarke | 667 | 22.59 |
| Labour | Jude Price | 550 | 18.63 |
| Green | Jacqueline Ann Hearn | 340 | 11.51 |
| Majority | | 729 | 24.68 |
| Liberal Democrats gain from Labour | | | |

=== Lawrence Hill ===
Bristol City Council Elections: Lawrence Hill Ward 2009
| Party | Candidate | Votes | % |
|---|---|---|---|
| Labour | Brenda Patricia Hugill | 914 | 31.53 |
| Liberal Democrats | Rae Gingell | 905 | 31.22 |
| Conservative | Sheena Begum | 484 | 16.7 |
| Green | Christine Prior | 360 | 12.42 |
| BNP | Janet Ashman | 236 | 8.14 |
| Majority | | 9 | 0.31 |
| Labour hold | | | |

=== Lockleaze ===
Bristol City Council Elections: Lockleaze Ward 2009
| Party | Candidate | Votes | % |
|---|---|---|---|
| Liberal Democrats | Guy James Baiden Poultney | 923 | 36.54 |
| Labour | David Alexander Bradley | 516 | 20.43 |
| Respect | Jerry Hicks | 377 | 14.92 |
| Conservative | Tony Lee | 309 | 12.23 |
| BNP | John Hooper | 210 | 8.31 |
| Green | Christina Mary Quinnell | 191 | 7.56 |
| Majority | | 407 | 16.11 |
| Liberal Democrats hold | | | |

=== Redland ===
Bristol City Council Elections: Redland Ward 2009
| Party | Candidate | Votes | % |
|---|---|---|---|
| Liberal Democrats | Fi Hance | 1,453 | 38.23 |
| Green | David Michael Joseph | 967 | 25.44 |
| Conservative | James Michael Barlow | 865 | 22.76 |
| Labour | Helen Frances Sproates | 516 | 13.58 |
| Majority | | 486 | 12.79 |
| Liberal Democrats hold | | | |

=== Southmead ===
Bristol City Council Elections: Southmead Ward 2009
| Party | Candidate | Votes | % |
|---|---|---|---|
| Liberal Democrats | Jacqueline Greta Bowles | 828 | 32.13 |
| Labour | Peter Warren Hammond | 808 | 31.35 |
| Conservative | Kyle Smith | 486 | 18.86 |
| English Democrat | Toby Hector | 295 | 11.45 |
| Green | Lela Helen McTernan | 160 | 6.21 |
| Majority | | 20 | 0.78 |
| Liberal Democrats gain from Labour | | | |

=== St George East ===
Bristol City Council Elections: St George East Ward 2009
| Party | Candidate | Votes | % |
|---|---|---|---|
| Conservative | Alex Pearce | 1,185 | 35.83 |
| Labour | Charlie Price | 733 | 22.17 |
| BNP | Michael John Carey | 575 | 17.39 |
| Liberal Democrats | Paul Elvin | 469 | 14.18 |
| Green | Graham Hugh Davey | 345 | 10.43 |
| Majority | | 452 | 13.66 |
| Conservative gain from Labour | | | |

=== St George West ===
Bristol City Council Elections: St George West Ward 2009
| Party | Candidate | Votes | % |
|---|---|---|---|
| Labour | Ron Stone | 892 | 31.65 |
| Liberal Democrats | Emma Jane Nyhan | 801 | 28.42 |
| Conservative | Colin Robert Bretherton | 436 | 15.47 |
| Green | Nick Foster | 293 | 10.4 |
| BNP | Chris Stocks | 211 | 7.49 |
| English Democrat | Lee Pickering | 185 | 6.56 |
| Majority | | 91 | 3.23 |
| Labour hold | | | |

=== Stoke Bishop ===
Bristol City Council Elections: Stoke Bishop Ward 2009
| Party | Candidate | Votes | % |
|---|---|---|---|
| Conservative | Peter John Abraham | 2,155 | 58.86 |
| Liberal Democrats | Mark James | 854 | 23.33 |
| Green | Keith Vivian Wiltshire | 373 | 10.19 |
| Labour | Dianne Elizabeth Manning | 279 | 7.62 |
| Majority | | 1301 | 35.53 |
| Conservative hold | | | |

=== Westbury-on-Trym ===
Bristol City Council Elections: Westbury-on-Trym Ward 2009
| Party | Candidate | Votes | % |
|---|---|---|---|
| Conservative | Geoffrey Richard Gollop | 2,198 | 51.84 |
| Liberal Democrats | Graham Christopher Donald | 1,231 | 29.03 |
| Green | Alex Dunn | 374 | 8.82 |
| Labour | Arthur Massey | 289 | 6.82 |
| English Democrat | Sara Box | 148 | 3.49 |
| Majority | | 967 | 22.81 |
| Conservative hold | | | |

== See also ==
- Politics of Bristol
- 2009 United Kingdom local elections
