= Politics of Bristol =

Overview of the politics of Bristol

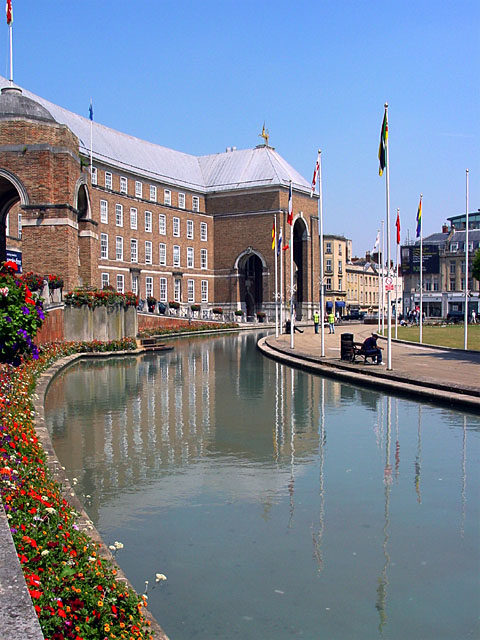
Bristol City Hall.

The city of Bristol, England, is a unitary authority, represented by four MPs representing seats wholly within the city boundaries. The overall trend of both local and national representation became left of centre during the latter 20th century. The city has a tradition of local activism, with environmental issues and sustainable transport being prominent issues in the city.

In 2017, the West of England Combined Authority and Mayor of the West of England were created covering the local authorities of Bristol, South Gloucestershire, and Bath and North East Somerset. Powers include transport and strategic planning for the combined areas.

== City Council ==
The City of Bristol is a ceremonial county governed by a unitary authority; Bristol City Council. The city is divided into 34 wards, which each elect one, two or three councillors (depending on the population of the ward) for a four-year term. The whole council is elected every four years.

The full council of 70 councillors has ultimate responsibility for establishing the decision-making process and approving the council's budget and policy framework. The council meets at the City Hall (known as the Council House up until 2012). Full meetings are chaired by the Lord Mayor, a largely ceremonial role that does not hold direct power. The Lord Mayor is a councillor, elected annually in May by the council members.

=== Composition and control ===
==== Current councillors ====
Party	Councillors
Green	34
Labour	19
Liberal Democrats	9
Conservative	7
Independent	1

Ward	Party	Councillor
Ashley	Green	Izzy Russell
Ashley	Green	Abdul Malik
Ashley	Green	Tim Wye
Avonmouth & Lawrence Weston	Labour	Donald Alexander
Avonmouth & Lawrence Weston	Liberal Democrats	Zoë Peat
Avonmouth & Lawrence Weston	Labour	Tom Blenkinsop
Bedminster	Labour	Emily Clark
Bedminster	Green	Ellie Freeman
Bishopston & Ashley Down	Green	Emma Edwards
Bishopston & Ashley Down	Green	James Crawford
Bishopsworth	Conservative	Richard Eddy
Bishopsworth	Labour	Susan Kollar
Brislington East	Labour	Katja Hornchen
Brislington East	Labour	Tim Rippington
Brislington West	Liberal Democrats	Jos Clark
Brislington West	Liberal Democrats	Andrew Varney
Central	Green	Sibusiso Tshabalala
Central	Green	Ani Townsend
Clifton	Green	Jerome Thomas
Clifton	Independent	Paula O'Rourke
Clifton Down	Green	George Calascione
Clifton Down	Green	Serena Ralston
Cotham	Green	Mohamed Makawi
Cotham	Green	Guy Poultney
Easton	Green	Jenny Bartle
Easton	Green	Barry Parsons
Eastville	Green	Ed Fraser
Eastville	Green	Lorraine Francis
Filwood	Labour	Lisa Durston
Filwood	Labour	Rob Logan
Frome Vale	Labour	Louis Martin
Frome Vale	Green	Al Al-Maghrabi
Hartcliffe & Withywood	Labour	Kerry Bailes
Hartcliffe & Withywood	Labour	Kirsty Tait
Hartcliffe & Withywood	Labour	Paul Goggin
Henbury & Brentry	Conservative	Mark Weston
Henbury & Brentry	Conservative	Bador Uddin
Hengrove & Whitchurch Park	Liberal Democrats	Andrew Brown
Hengrove & Whitchurch Park	Liberal Democrats	Sarah Classick
Hengrove & Whitchurch Park	Liberal Democrats	Tim Kent
Hillfields	Labour	Kelvin Blake
Hillfields	Labour	Ellie King
Horfield	Labour	Carole Johnson
Horfield	Labour	Tom Renhard
Hotwells & Harbourside	Green	Patrick McAllister
Knowle	Green	Toby Wells
Knowle	Green	Cam Hayward
Lawrence Hill	Green	Shona Jemphrey
Lawrence Hill	Green	Yassin Mohamud
Lockleaze	Green	Heather Mack
Lockleaze	Green	David Wilcox
Redland	Green	Martin Fodor
Redland	Green	Fi Hance
Southmead	Labour	Kye Dudd
Southmead	Labour	Kaz Self
Southville	Green	Tony Dyer
Southville	Green	Christine Townsend
St George Central	Green	Abi Finch
St George Central	Green	Cara Lavan
St George Troopers Hill	Labour	Fabian Breckels
St George West	Green	Rob Bryher
Stockwood	Conservative	Jonathan Hucker
Stockwood	Conservative	Graham Morris
Stoke Bishop	Conservative	John Goulandris
Stoke Bishop	Conservative	Henry Michallat
Westbury-on-Trym & Henleaze	Liberal Democrats	Stephen Williams
Westbury-on-Trym & Henleaze	Liberal Democrats	Nicholas Coombes
Westbury-on-Trym & Henleaze	Liberal Democrats	Caroline Gooch
Windmill Hill	Green	Ed Plowden
Windmill Hill	Green	Lisa Stone

== Combined Authority ==
Since February 2017, Bristol has been part of the West of England Combined Authority. It was originally meant to cover the same area as the former county of Avon which existed between 1974 and 1996, but North Somerset Council rejected the proposal. The Councils of Bristol, South Gloucestershire and Bath and North East Somerset agreed to proceed with the deal without North Somerset.

The authority's functions, as specified by the West of England Combined Authority Order, mostly cover planning, skills and local transport.

The first election for the position of Mayor of the West of England took place on 4 May 2017, and was won by Tim Bowles of the Conservatives with a total of 70,300 votes, including second preferences. The turnout was 29.7%, with 199,519 voting out of the possible 671,280. The second election took place in 2021 and was won by Labour candidate and former MP for Wansdyke Dan Norris. Helen Godwin, for the Labour party, was elected the next mayor on 1 May 2025.

The cabinet of the Combined Authority consists of the leaders of all three constituent councils, plus the Mayor of the West of England.

== Westminster representation ==
Bristol constituencies following the 2017 general election.

No seats changed parties in 2019.

The names of parliamentary constituencies in Bristol were changed in 1885 when the original Bristol (UK Parliament constituency) was split into four and they were revised further in the 20th century.

As of the 2019 election, there were four Westminster constituencies that were part of Bristol proper—Bristol West, Bristol East, Bristol South and Bristol North West.

The 2023 Periodic Review of Westminster constituencies proposed the abolition of Bristol West and re-establishment of the seats of Bristol Central and Bristol North East. This came into effect at the 2024 United Kingdom general election. The new Bristol North East seat includes parts of the city of Bristol and of the neighbouring South Gloucestershire local authority.

Current constituencies in Bristol by holding party 2025
Constituency	Party	Member
Bristol Central	Green	Carla Denyer
Bristol East	Labour	Kerry McCarthy
Bristol North East	Labour	Damien Egan
Bristol North West	Labour	Darren Jones
Bristol South	Labour	Karin Smyth

Historic constituencies in Bristol
	1295–1885	1885–1918	1918–1950	1950–1974	1974–1983	1983—2024	2024—
Bristol	1295–1885						
Bristol North		1885–1950					
Bristol East		1885–1950				1983—	
Bristol Central			1918 – 1974				2024 –
Bristol North East				1950:1983			2024 –
Bristol North West				1950–			
Bristol South		1885–					
Bristol South East				1950:1983			
Bristol West		1885–2024					

Parts of Greater Bristol outside the Bristol City Council administrative area, are covered by the Filton and Bradley Stoke and Kingswood constituencies in South Gloucestershire, the eponymous constituency of North Somerset in North Somerset, and North East Somerset in the authority of Bath and North East Somerset.

== History ==
Historically, the council has been dominated by the Labour Party. However, in 2005, the Liberal Democrats became the minority administration. This lasted until just after the 2007 elections, when the Labour, Conservative and Green party groups joined forces to oust the Lib Dems and install a minority Labour administration. On 24 February 2009 the minority Labour administration resigned following a defeat over plans to build an incinerator in Avonmouth, and the Liberal Democrats resumed control.

In 2009, the election resulted in the Liberal Democrats taking overall majority control of Bristol City Council for the first time. In 2010, they increased their representation to 38 seats giving them a majority of six. In 2011, they lost their majority leading to a hung council.

In 2012, the inaugural election for the position of Mayor of Bristol was held, with architect and former Liberal councillor George Ferguson being elected under the banner of Bristol 1st.

The 2013 local elections, in which a third of the city's wards were up for election, saw Labour gain seven seats and the Green party double their seats from two to four while the Liberal Democrats suffered a loss of ten seats. These trends were continued into the next election in May 2014, in which Labour gained three seats to take their total to 31, the Green Party built on their success by winning two more seats, the Conservatives gained one seat and UKIP won their first ever seat on the council. In another damaging result, the Lib Dems lost a further seven seats. In March 2015, the only Independent Councillor on Bristol City Council joined the Conservatives, bringing their total up to 16.

In May 2015, the Green Party continued to increase their number of seats, winning seven new seats (five from the Lib Dems and two from Labour) and becoming the third largest party on the council, with the Lib Dems now in fourth. Labour also gained a new seat at the expense of the Lib Dems. The Lib Dem's decline was compounded later that month when one of the remaining Lib Dem Councillors defected to the Greens, leaving the Lib Dems with 9 seats and the Greens with 14.

Prior to 2016 ward boundary changes, all wards had two councillors, one third of the councillors were elected three years in four, but as only one councillor from any ward stood at a time, two-thirds of wards were competed each election.

The 2016 election saw Labour gain seven seats and in turn regained overall control of the council, with the Conservatives, Greens and Lib Dems all losing two seats and UKIP losing their only seat. Labour candidate Marvin Rees was also elected Mayor, ousting incumbent George Ferguson.

Because the COVID-19 pandemic, the 2020 election was postponed until May 2021. This election saw a surge in support for the Greens, with them gaining 13 seats, becoming the joint largest party on the Council and Labour losing their majority. Marvin Rees was re-elected as Mayor, with the Green's Sandy Hore-Ruthven coming in second place. In July 2021, the Greens elected a Shadow Cabinet to rival Labour. The Liberal Democrats originally gained eight seats in the election, however on 13 December 2021 former Lord Mayor Chris Davies and former Lib Dem Bristol group leader Gary Hopkins left the party to form the Knowle Community Party.

In December 2022, Alex Hartley, the Liberal Democrat councillor for Hotwells and Harbourside, resigned, triggering a by-election that was held on 2 February 2023. The by-election was won by the Green Party candidate, Patrick McAllister; elevating the Greens to the largest party on the council for the first time.

On 12 December 2023, Labour councillor for Filwood, Zoe Goodman resigned from the Labour Party over its response to what she called "the genocide in Gaza", becoming an independent councillor.

=== Mayor ===
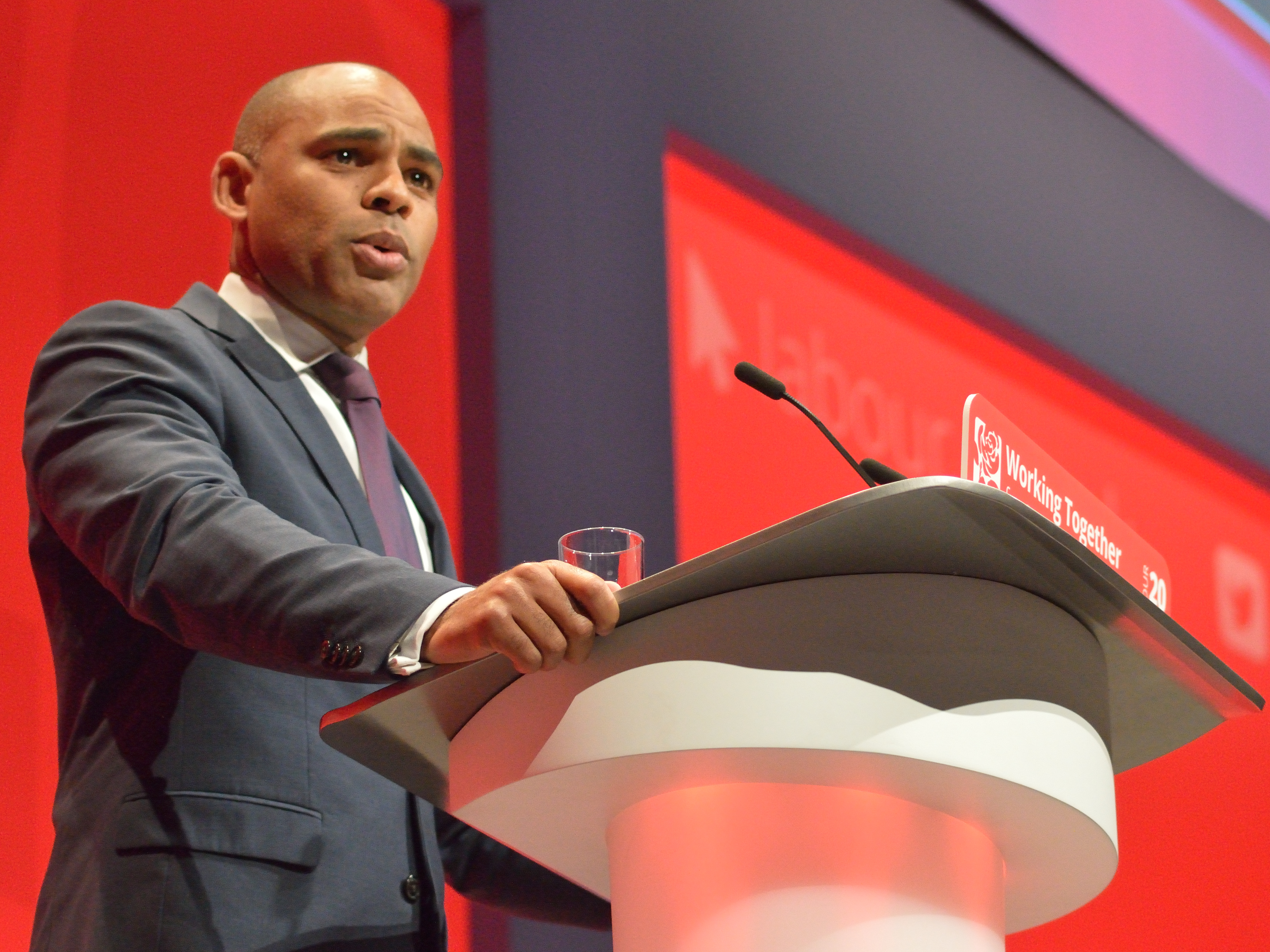
Marvin Rees, Mayor of Bristol from 2016 to 2024

On 3 May 2012, Bristol held a referendum to decide whether the city should have a directly elected mayor to replace the leader elected by councillors. The result was 41,032 for an elected mayor and 35,880 against, with a turnout of 24%. The Lib Dems and Greens were publicly opposed to the introduction of a directly elected mayor, whilst Labour took a neutral stance and the Conservatives were the only party to support it.

An election for the new post was held on 15 November 2012, with Independent candidate George Ferguson becoming the first Mayor of Bristol.

Ferguson was ousted at the 2016 election by Labour candidate Marvin Rees, who was subsequently re-elected in the 2021.

On 7 December 2021, the majority of opposition Councillors backed a legally binding motion to hold a referendum on the future of the role of the elected mayor of Bristol. The referendum, which took place in May 2022, offered Bristolians the choice of keeping an elected mayor or going back to the committee system of governance that was in place before Ferguson became the city's first directly elected Mayor.

Subsequently, on 5 May 2022, the city voted to abolish the position in the referendum, replacing it with a committee system in May 2024.

== See also ==
- Bristol City Council elections
- 2010 United Kingdom general election results in Bristol
- History of local government in Bristol
- History of Bristol City Council
- Avon and Somerset Police and Crime Commissioner
- List of parliamentary constituencies in Avon
- Politics of the United Kingdom
