= 2024 Bristol City Council election =

Local election in Bristol, England

- 2 May 2024

All 70 seats to Bristol City Council 36 seats needed for a majority

	Majority party	Minority party
Leader	Emma Edwards (Note: Emma Edwards was group leader, but it was announced before the election that Tony Dyer was the party's intended nominee for leader of the council.)	Tom Renhard
Party	Green	Labour
Last election	24 seats	24 seats
Seats before	24	23
Seats after	34	21
Seat change	▲10	▼3
Popular vote	50,512	38,868
Percentage	41.2%	31.7%
Swing	▲9.4%	Steady
	Third party	Fourth party
Leader	Jos Clark	Mark Weston
Party	Liberal Democrats	Conservative
Last election	8 seats	14 seats
Seats before	5	14
Seats after	8	7
Seat change	▲3	▼7
Popular vote	13,359	17,398
Percentage	10.9%	14.2%
Swing	▼3.8%	▼7.1%
- Winner of each seat at the 2024 Bristol City Council election
Mayor before election
Marvin Rees
Labour
No overall control
Leader after election
Tony Dyer
Green
No overall control

The 2024 Bristol City Council election was held on Thursday 2 May 2024, alongside the other local elections in the United Kingdom. It elected all 70 councillors to the Bristol City Council for a four-year term.

Until this election the council was led by the directly-elected Mayor of Bristol; that post was abolished following a 2022 referendum which saw 59% of voters in favour of replacing the mayoral system with a committee system. Prior to the election the council was under no overall control. The Green Party were the largest party, but the mayoralty was held by Marvin Rees of the Labour Party and all the cabinet positions were held by Labour.

Following the election the council remained under no overall control. The Greens remained the largest party and increased their number of seats, but fell two seats short of winning an overall majority. At the subsequent annual council meeting on 21 May 2024, Green councillor Tony Dyer was appointed to the re-established position of leader of the council (which had been abolished on the creation of the directly elected mayoralty in 2012). Policy committee chair positions were shared amongst the Greens and Liberal Democrats.

== Background ==
Following the previous election, which was held in 2021, the council was in no overall control, though was run by the Mayor Marvin Rees and an all Labour cabinet. In the intervening 3 years, four by-elections occurred, seeing the Green Party gain one seat from the Liberal Democrats with no other change to the political makeup of the council.

Pre-Election Composition
Party	Seats
Green Party	24
Labour Party	23
Conservative Party	14
Liberal Democrats	5
Knowle Community Party	2
Independent	2

Post-Election Composition
Party	Seats
Green Party	34 (+10)
Labour Party	21* (-3)
Liberal Democrats	8 (+3)
Conservative Party	7 (-7)
Knowle Community Party	0 (-2)
Independent	0 (-2)

Winning Labour candidate for Horfield, Deborah Vittori, was disqualified from holding office following the election as she was an employee of the council, being a teacher in a local authority maintained primary school. This reduced Labour seats to 20; there will be a by-election.

== Councillors standing down ==
Councillor	Ward	First elected	Party	Date announced
Helen Holland	Hartcliffe and Withywood	1992	Labour	29 August 2023
Craig Cheney	Hillfields	2015	Labour	31 August 2023
Nicola Beech	St George Central	2016	Labour	6 September 2023
Steve Pearce	St George Central	2013	Labour	6 September 2023
Asher Craig	St George West	2016	Labour	9 September 2023
Carla Denyer	Clifton Down	2015	Green	13 November 2023
Jude English	Ashley	2016	Independent (Note: English was elected as a Green councillor in 2016 and 2021, but got suspended from the party in 2024 following an internal complaint.)	N/A
Mark Bradshaw	Bedminster	2016	Labour	N/A
Tessa Fitzjohn	Bedminster	2021	Green	N/A
Farah Hussain	Central	2021	Labour	N/A
Katy Grant	Clifton	2021	Green	N/A
Tom Hathway	Clifton Down	2021	Green	N/A
Zoe Goodman	Filwood	2021	Independent (Note: Goodman was elected as a Labour councillor in 2021, but resigned from the party in 2023 over the party's stance on the Gaza war)	N/A
Chris Jackson	Filwood	2021	Labour	N/A
Lesley Alexander	Frome Vale	2011	Conservative	N/A
Chris Windows	Henbury & Brentry	2016	Conservative	N/A
Philippa Hulme	Horfield	2021	Labour	N/A
Chris Davies	Knowle	2003	KCP (Note: Davies was elected several times as a Liberal Democrat councillor, but both Liberal Democrat councillors resigned in to form the Knowle Community Party in 2021.)	N/A
Hibaq Jama	Lawrence Hill	2016	Labour	N/A
Brenda Massey	Southmead	2016	Labour	N/A

== Summary ==
=== Candidates ===
The Green Party, Labour, Liberal Democrats and the Conservatives all stood a full slate of candidates. From these parties, alongside 1 from the Knowle Community Party, 50 incumbents stood for reelection. The Trade Unionist and Socialist Coalition fielded 18 candidates, and the Social Democratic Party stood 2. One independent stood.

In March, the Green Party suspended one of its candidates in the Eastville ward following his arrest on the suspicion of handling stolen goods.

=== Election result ===
2024 Bristol City Council election
Party	Candidates	Seats	Gains	Losses	Net gain/loss	Seats %	Votes %	Votes	+/−
Green	70	34	10	0	▲10	48.6	39.6	95,269	+7.9
Labour	70	21	4	7	▼2	30.0	32.2	77,386	+0.3
Conservative	70	7	0	7	▼7	10.0	14.3	34,470	–6.9
Liberal Democrats	70	8	3	3	▲3	11.4	12.5	30,192	–2.2
Knowle Community Party	2	0	0	2	▼2	0.0	0.7	1,648	N/A
TUSC	16	0	0	0	Steady	0.0	0.5	1,160	+0.2
SDP	2	0	0	0	Steady	0.0	0.1	247	N/A
Independent	2	0	0	0	▼2	0.0	0.1	237	±0.0

== Ward results ==
Each ward elects 1 to 3 councillors each, depending on the size of the electorate:

=== Ashley ===
Ashley (3 seats)
Party	Candidate	Votes	%	±%
Green	Izzy Russell	3,763	60.36	+4.97
Green	Abdul Malik	3,691	59.21	+26.48
Green	Tim Wye*	3,506	56.24	+25.85
Labour	Amira Cole*	2,446	39.24	−3.64
Labour	Susannah Harlow	1,991	31.94	+1.62
Labour	Issac Evans	1,762	28.26	+6.98
Liberal Democrats	Ian Harris	212	3.40	−13.38
Independent	Robbie Bentley	135	2.17	−0.68
Conservative	Yasmin Sealy	135	2.17	−23.41
Liberal Democrats	Beverley Knott	133	2.13	−11.98
Conservative	Allison Judge	120	1.92	−11.42
Conservative	Charles Stuart	112	1.80	−1.36
Liberal Democrats	Philip Kemp	106	1.70	−1.61
Turnout		6,234	43.73	−4.64
Green gain from Labour				
Green hold				
Green hold				

=== Avonmouth and Lawrence Weston ===
Avonmouth and Lawrence Weston (3 seats)
Party	Candidate	Votes	%	±%
Labour	Don Alexander*	1,723	42.03	+9.17
Labour	Zoe Peat	1,608	39.20	+10.49
Labour	Tom Blenkinsop	1,463	35.69	+12.06
Green	Jo Sergeant	1,406	34.30	+4.56
Green	Mary Page	1,047	25.54	+9.32
Conservative	Daphne Chikwere	955	23.30	−7.00
Conservative	James Scott*	944	23.03	−7.02
Conservative	John Geater*	903	22.03	−2.42
Green	Moises Santo	850	20.74	+6.84
Liberal Democrats	Graham Donald	291	7.10	+0.53
Liberal Democrats	Janet Gibson	206	5.03	−0.23
Liberal Democrats	Janet Walton-Masters	161	3.93	−1.23
Turnout		4,099	25.77	−6.74
Labour hold				
Labour gain from Conservative				
Labour gain from Conservative				

=== Bedminster ===
Bedminster (2 seats)
Party	Candidate	Votes	%	±%
Green	Ellie Freeman	1,964	46.91	+6.32
Labour	Emily Clarke	1,895	45.26	+4.97
Green	Jaz Beard	1,842	43.99	+17.90
Labour	Adam Potter	1,547	36.95	−2.70
Conservative	Ian Haynes	288	6.88	−9.28
Conservative	Rajesh Joseph	208	4.97	−5.79
Liberal Democrats	Alex Birrell	97	2.32	−3.18
TUSC	Tony Rowe	84	2.01	+2.01
Liberal Democrats	Samuel Merchant	67	1.60	−1.90
Turnout		4,187	41.65	−3.17
Green hold				
Labour hold				

=== Bishopston & Ashley Down ===
Bishopston & Ashley Down (2 seats)
Party	Candidate	Votes	%	±%
Green	Emma Edwards*	2,615	59.87	+7.19
Green	James Crawford*	2,405	55.06	+9.45
Labour	Andrew Milton	1,432	32.78	+5.68
Labour	Eileen Means	1,316	30.13	+3.81
Liberal Democrats	Laura Barry	190	4.35	−8.10
Liberal Democrats	Barry Cash	190	4.35	−7.13
Conservative	Samuel Williams	159	3.64	−2.76
Conservative	Edward Yates	139	3.18	−3.08
Turnout		4,368	49.00	−6.88
Green hold				
Green hold				

James Crawford was elected in a by-election on the 24th of August 2023 after the former councillor, Lily Fitzgibbon, stood down to move from the area.

=== Bishopsworth ===
Bishopsworth (2 seats)
Party	Candidate	Votes	%	±%
Conservative	Richard Eddy*	994	38.03	−10.47
Labour	Susan Kollar	985	37.68	+10.62
Labour	Kacpar Zedzierski	844	32.29	+9.63
Conservative	Kevin Quartley	829	31.71	−5.11
Green	Anna Archer	555	21.23	+8.49
Green	Jon Eldridge	431	16.49	+5.40
Liberal Democrats	Sylvia Doubell	124	4.74	−3.14
Liberal Democrats	Mary Sykes	113	4.32	+2.60
Turnout		2,614	27.99	−6.80
Conservative hold				
Labour gain from Conservative				

=== Brislington East ===
Brislington East (2 seats)
Party	Candidate	Votes	%	±%
Labour	Katja Hornchen*	1,248	54.50	+16.73
Labour	Tim Rippington*	1,209	52.79	+19.91
Green	Ahmed Gill	622	27.16	+9.75
Green	Tilly Green	609	26.59	+15.16
Liberal Democrats	Peter Badger	357	15.59	−5.33
Conservative	Anne-Marie Mason	327	14.28	−7.29
Liberal Democrats	Pauline Allen	312	13.67	+5.86
Conservative	Norman Mayer	304	13.28	−2.46
Turnout		2,290	37.12	−8.95
Labour hold				
Labour hold				

=== Brislington West ===
Brislington West (2 seats)
Party	Candidate	Votes	%	±%
Liberal Democrats	Jos Clark*	1,711	48.50	+4.10
Liberal Democrats	Andrew John Varney*	1,574	44.61	+9.39
Labour	Carolyn Magson	1,070	30.33	−1.06
Labour	David Jepson	955	27.07	+2.83
Green	Nadia Kevlin	664	18.54	+2.90
Green	Sam Knights	483	13.69	+2.70
Conservative	Nick Hiscott	133	3.77	−5.17
Conservative	Kim Stretton-Pow	116	3.29	−4.94
TUSC	Domenico Hill	63	1.79	+1.79
Turnout		3,528	37.67	−8.49
Liberal Democrats hold				
Liberal Democrats hold				

=== Central ===
Central (2 seats)
Party	Candidate	Votes	%	±%
Green	Ani Stafford-Townsend*	1,407	51.33	+11.20
Green	Sibusiso Tshabalala	1,242	45.31	+15.27
Labour	Sarah Chaffer-Swingler	1,093	39.88	+7.00
Labour	Matt Redmore	944	34.44	+1.99
Conservative	Julian Elacott	157	5.73	−6.87
Conservative	Tony Lee	152	5.55	−5.43
Liberal Democrats	Adam Harvey	117	4.27	−7.11
Liberal Democrats	Henry Windle	85	3.10	−6.05
TUSC	Nick Clare	78	2.85	+2.85
Turnout		2,741	30.60	+1.08
Green gain from Labour				
Green hold				

=== Clifton ===
Clifton (2 seats)
Party	Candidate	Votes	%	±%
Green	Paula O'Rourke*	2,126	60.86	+9.79
Green	Jerome Thomas	1,849	52.93	+4.78
Labour	Elena Dirik	872	24.96	+5.93
Labour	Dan McTiernan	655	18.75	+4.16
Conservative	Thomas Bond	376	10.76	−2.78
Conservative	Alistair Hamilton	362	10.36	−3.14
Liberal Democrats	Ana Clark	242	6.93	−6.09
Liberal Democrats	Neil Harvie	230	6.58	−3.22
Turnout		3,493	39.32	−9.25
Green hold				
Green hold				

=== Clifton Down ===
Clifton Down (2 seats)
Party	Candidate	Votes	%	±%
Green	Serena Ralston	1,813	56.96	−3.30
Green	George Calascione	1,705	53.57	+10.61
Labour	Tristan Harris	903	28.37	+6.80
Labour	Nick Smith	803	25.23	+9.19
Conservative	Michael Abbott	294	9.24	−1.77
Conservative	Harry Lucas	250	7.85	−1.88
Liberal Democrats	Elizabeth Badman	186	5.84	−5.07
Liberal Democrats	Merche Clark	166	5.22	−5.28
TUSC	Suzanne Muna	78	2.45	+2.45
Turnout		3,183	41.36	−3.24
Green hold				
Green hold				

=== Cotham ===
Cotham (2 seats)
Party	Candidate	Votes	%	±%
Green	Mohamed Alaaeldin Yousif Makawi*	2,056	61.76	+12.18
Green	Guy James Baiden Poultney*	2,034	61.10	+16.71
Labour	Rob Knowles-Leak	730	21.93	+5.07
Labour	Sean Smyth	652	19.59	+4.10
Liberal Democrats	Phyllis Rayner	387	11.63	−17.41
Liberal Democrats	Robert Bristow	313	9.40	−8.49
Conservative	Julien Carey	143	4.30	−3.88
Conservative	Tim Duggan	132	3.97	−1.17
Turnout		3,329	42.00	−6.08
Green hold				
Green hold				

=== Easton ===
Easton (2 seats)
Party	Candidate	Votes	%	±%
Green	Jenny Bartle*	2,952	69.64	+25
Green	Barry William Parsons*	2,523	59.52	+20.79
Labour	Nardia Ferguson	1,145	27.02	−7.41
Labour	Shahzad Sarfraz	774	18.26	−16.10
TUSC	Chris Parry	149	3.51	+3.51
Conservative	Veronica Daniels	124	2.93	−3.32
Liberal Democrats	Paul Elvin	120	2.83	−4.82
Conservative	Patricia Hedges	118	2.78	−2.14
Liberal Democrats	Anne-Marie Clark	110	2.59	−3.17
Turnout		4,239	39.70	−9.23
Green hold				
Green hold				

=== Eastville ===
Eastville (2 seats)
Party	Candidate	Votes	%	±%
Green	Lorraine Francis*	2,339	59.73	+14.48
Green	Ed Fraser	1,672	42.70	+17.73
Labour	Marley Bennett*	1,568	40.04	+2.43
Labour	Teresa Stratford	1,027	26.23	−0.85
Conservative	Paul Boobyer	277	7.07	−4.15
Conservative	Elaine Iffland	234	5.98	−3.97
Liberal Democrats	Timothy Hobbs	116	2.96	−11.76
Liberal Democrats	Mohammad Abdur Rashid	105	2.68	−5.19
TUSC	Annabel Griffiths	84	2.15	−1.06
TUSC	Mike Luff	69	1.76	+1.76
Turnout		3,916	36.53	−6.43
Green hold				
Green gain from Labour				

=== Filwood ===
Filwood (2 seats)
Party	Candidate	Votes	%	±%
Labour	Lisa Durston	1,088	51.08	+11.13
Labour	Rob Logan	1,004	47.14	+10.16
Green	Danica Priest	640	30.05	+8.73
Green	Jai Breitnauer	637	29.91	+11.91
Conservative	Paul Harding	223	10.47	−6.96
Conservative	Paul Keith-Hill	196	9.20	−2.90
Liberal Democrats	Gregory Chadwick	98	4.60	−3.09
TUSC	Robin Victor Clapp	77	3.62	−0.91
Liberal Democrats	Benjamin Goldstrom	49	2.30	−3.09
Turnout		2,130	21.49	−3.96
Labour hold				
Labour hold				

=== Frome Vale ===
Frome Vale (2 seats)
Party	Candidate	Votes	%	±%
Labour	Louis Martin	1,402	45.15	+6.11
Labour	Al Al-Maghrabi	1,339	43.12	+14.84
Green	Jen Law	899	28.95	+10.45
Green	Gabrielle Lobb	724	23.32	+3.18
Conservative	Pooja Poddar	447	14.40	−18.10
Conservative	Tulsidas Poddar	377	12.14	−6.57
Liberal Democrats	Rochelle Amos	214	6.89	+1.37
Liberal Democrats	Keith Fenner	214	6.89	+1.73
SDP	Tommy Trueman	188	6.05	+3.18
TUSC	John Healy	86	2.77	+2.77
Turnout		3,105	31.18	−8.07
Labour hold				
Labour gain from Conservative				

=== Hartcliffe & Withywood ===
Hartcliffe & Withywood (3 seats)
Party	Candidate	Votes	%	±%
Labour	Kerry Johanna Bailes*	965	52.33	+13.91
Labour	Kirsty Tait	873	47.34	+9.03
Labour	Paul Goggin*	846	45.88	+16.54
Conservative	Gareth Potter	437	23.70	−4.67
Conservative	Joseph Fox-Bowen	430	23.32	−1.78
Conservative	Prasanna Ramarathnam	383	20.77	−3.43
Green	Tash Clarke	324	17.57	+5.04
Green	Charlie Bolton	312	16.92	+6.90
Green	Sam Marshall Evans	276	14.97	+5.51
Liberal Democrats	Gary Dean Perry	117	6.34	−4.50
Liberal Democrats	Alistair Wall	87	4.72	−0.91
Liberal Democrats	Matthew Roberts	86	4.66	−0.70
Turnout		1,844	14.23	−6.10
Labour hold				
Labour hold				
Labour hold				

=== Henbury & Brentry ===
Henbury & Brentry (2 seats)
Party	Candidate	Votes	%	±%
Conservative	Mark Roscoe Weston	1,641	53.49	+0.89
Conservative	Bador Uddin	1,331	43.38	+7.57
Labour	Wendy Baverstock	1,036	33.77	+5.96
Labour	Peter Brindle	1,002	32.66	+8.01
Green	Jean Pears	279	9.09	−4.22
Green	Aimee Green	263	8.57	+0.43
Liberal Democrats	Gillian Brooks	103	3.36	−2.74
Liberal Democrats	Sylvia Townsend	80	2.61	−1.79
TUSC	Stephen Bennett	43	1.40	−0.19
Turnout		3,068	31.96	−4.99
Conservative hold				
Conservative hold				

=== Hengrove & Whitchurch Park ===
Hengrove & Whitchurch Park (3 seats)
Party	Candidate	Votes	%	±%
Liberal Democrats	Tim Kent*	2,218	60.12	+4.92
Liberal Democrats	Andrew Brown*	1,956	53.02	+14.12
Liberal Democrats	Sarah Classick*	1,954	52.97	+14.42
Labour	Greg Dowling	659	17.86	+2.40
Labour	Brandon Gage	634	17.19	+3.18
Labour	Ajma Miah	607	16.45	+5.15
Conservative	Karen Brown	506	13.72	−13.60
Conservative	Adam Brown	487	13.20	−4.32
Conservative	Nigel Brown	483	13.09	−3.67
Green	Andrew Bradbury	339	9.19	+1.94
Green	Georgia Nelson	321	8.70	+3.37
Green	Paul Grover	247	6.70	+2.58
SDP	Neil Norton	59	1.60	+1.60
Turnout		3,689	24.94	−9.23
Liberal Democrats hold				
Liberal Democrats hold				
Liberal Democrats hold				

=== Hillfields ===
Hillfields (2 seats)
Party	Candidate	Votes	%	±%
Labour	Ellie King*	1,155	48.49	+5.09
Labour	Kelvin Blake	1,081	45.38	+5.54
Green	Jon Eccles	719	30.18	+10.50
Green	Rick Lovering	513	21.54	+3.85
Conservative	Rory Adamson	310	13.01	−8.89
Conservative	Enrico Corradi	257	10.79	−5,43
Liberal Democrats	Deborah Bishop	167	7.01	+0.92
Liberal Democrats	Sarah Spilsbury	109	4.58	−1.14
TUSC	Dan Smart	77	3.23	+3.23
Turnout		2,382	25.52	−8.45
Labour hold				
Labour hold				

=== Horfield ===
Horfield (2 seats)
Party	Candidate	Votes	%	±%
Labour	Tom Renhard*	1,495	48.87	+8.15
Labour	Deborah Vittori (disqualified)	1,485	48.55	+19.54
Green	Anna Meares	903	29.52	+6.76
Green	Stephen Lloyd	672	21.97	+9.62
Conservative	Simon Davies	466	15.23	−8.51
Conservative	Jaques Roddy	417	13.63	−6.23
Liberal Democrats	Roxanne Lock	193	6.31	−9.14
Liberal Democrats	Ian Parry	132	4.32	−10.92
TUSC	Joan Molins	91	2.97	+2.97
Turnout		3,059	33.00	−9.62
Labour hold				
Labour hold				

Labour candidate Deborah Vittori was disqualified from holding office following the election as she was an employee of the council, being a teacher in a local authority maintained primary school. Labour retained the seat at the by-election on 4 July, electing Carole Anne Jean Johnson by a smaller majority of 103 votes.

=== Hotwells & Harbourside ===
Hotwells & Harbourside (1 seat)
Party	Candidate	Votes	%	±%
Green	Patrick McAllister*	974	63.33	+31.75
Labour	Alex Bullett	336	21.85	−3.22
Liberal Democrats	Thomas Grunshaw	109	7.09	−25.81
Conservative	Caroline Lucas	86	5.59	−3.60
TUSC	Daniel Evans	26	1.69	+1.69
Turnout		1,538	39.75	−5.87
Green gain from Liberal Democrats				

Patrick McAllister was elected in a by-election on the 2nd of February 2023 after the previous councillor, Alex Hartley, stepped down for health reasons.

=== Knowle ===
Knowle (2 seats)
Party	Candidate	Votes	%	±%
Green	Cam Hayward	1,542	37.45	+16.11
Green	Toby Wells	1,482	36.00	+23.44
Knowle Community Party	Gary Hopkins*	905	21.98	+21.98
Liberal Democrats	Anna Fry	795	19.31	−19.55
Labour	Shabab Akhtar	761	18.48	−6.66
Knowle Community Party	Ghislaine Swinburn	743	18.05	+18.05
Labour	Christopher Orlik	706	17.15	−6.17
Liberal Democrats	Zac Barker	701	17.03	−21.17
Conservative	Norma Scott	126	3.06	−5.54
Conservative	Bright Rubwe	101	2.45	−4.34
Turnout		4,117	39.09	−3.93
Green gain from Liberal Democrats				
Green gain from Liberal Democrats				

Councillors Gary Hopkins & Christopher Davies left the Liberal Democrats in December 2021 to form the Knowle Community Party.

=== Lawrence Hill ===
Lawrence Hill (2 seats)
Party	Candidate	Votes	%	±%
Green	Yassin Hassan Mohamud*	1,952	55.53	+17.17
Green	Shona Jemphrey	1,753	49.87	+16.52
Labour	Amal Ali	1,304	37.10	−3.97
Labour	Mohamed Omer	1,111	31.61	−0.41
Conservative	Eliana Barbosa	110	3.12	−2.12
Conservative	Sandra Seymour	109	3.10	−2.12
Liberal Democrats	Crispin Allard	107	3.04	−0.76
Liberal Democrats	Davin Cordingley-Wiid	85	2.42	−1.15
Turnout		3,515	28.1	−9.14
Green hold				
Green gain from Labour				

=== Lockleaze ===
Lockleaze (2 seats)
Party	Candidate	Votes	%	±%
Green	Heather Mack*	1,696	54.87	+12.39
Green	David Wilcox*	1,470	47.56	+13.01
Labour	Deniece Dixon	1,040	33.65	+1.01
Labour	Abdi Farah	927	29.99	−1.68
Conservative	Richard Clifton	242	7.83	−4.83
Conservative	Paul Dawson	231	7.47	−2.82
TUSC	Roger Stephen Thomas	125	4.04	+0.99
Liberal Democrats	Sharon Beynon	118	3.82	−1.63
Liberal Democrats	Paul Scroggs	77	2.49	−1.19
Turnout		3,091	32.90	−4.38
Green hold				
Green hold				

=== Redland ===
Redland (2 seats)
Party	Candidate	Votes	%	±%
Green	Fi Hance*	2,826	58.75	−6.13
Green	Martin Fodor*	2,669	55.49	+3.92
Labour	Thomas Lydon	1,405	29.21	+2.25
Labour	James Nethercote	1,345	27.96	+8.66
Conservative	George Day	341	7.09	−2.58
Conservative	Claire Hiscott	340	7.07	−1.04
Liberal Democrats	Joshua Warwick-Smith	201	4.18	−3.54
Liberal Democrats	James Anthony Wetz	177	3.68	−3.21
Turnout		4,810	48.28	−8.19
Green hold				
Green hold				

=== Southmead ===
Southmead (2 seats)
Party	Candidate	Votes	%	±%
Labour	Kye Dudd*	1,224	50.50	+5.85
Labour	Kaz Self	994	41.01	−0.25
Green	Kat Bristow	711	29.33	+9.91
Green	Tom Wilson	568	23.43	+9.03
Conservative	Jack Payne	378	15.59	−13.52
Conservative	Ann Pulteney	358	14.77	−9.44
Liberal Democrats	Clare Campion-Smith	168	6.93	−3.42
Liberal Democrats	Ian Campion-Smith	95	3.92	−3.40
Turnout		2,424	26.00	−5.28
Labour hold				
Labour hold				

Kye Dudd was elected in a by-election on the 17th of February 2022 following the previous councillor, Helen Godwin, stepping down due to time constraints with her other job.

=== Southville ===
Southville (2 seats)
Party	Candidate	Votes	%	±%
Green	Tony Dyer*	2,385	58.88	+9.46
Green	Christine Charlotte Townsend*	2,351	57.99	+19.47
Labour	Miriam Venner	1,247	21.01	−5.74
Labour	Will Sainty	1,193	29.43	−4.20
Conservative	Alexander Gibson	183	4.51	−3.12
Liberal Democrats	Kirsty Craig	141	3.48	−1.23
Conservative	Buch Osuji	137	3.38	−2.31
Liberal Democrats	Mick O'Neill Duff	88	2.17	−1.58
Turnout		4,054	41.86	−7.86
Green hold				
Green hold				

=== St George Central ===
St George Central (2 seats)
Party	Candidate	Votes	%	±%
Green	Abi Finch	1,726	52.56	+28.53
Green	Cara Lavan	1,496	45.55	+33.39
Labour	Sally Bowman	1,246	37.94	−11.35
Labour	Henry Palmer	1,041	31.70	+2.41
Conservative	James Hinchcliffe	283	8.62	−11.71
Conservative	Justyna Hinchcliffe	248	7.55	−12.35
Liberal Democrats	Alistair Kirtley	78	2.38	−5.86
TUSC	Kristopher Barker	70	2.13	+2.13
Liberal Democrats	Brian Price	57	1.74	−2.82
Turnout		3,284	31.56	−2.76
Green gain from Labour				
Green gain from Labour				

=== St George Troopers Hill ===
St George Troopers Hill (1 seat)
Party	Candidate	Votes	%	±%
Labour Co-op	Fabian Guy Breckels*	811	54.83	+8.25
Green	Anna Bryher	369	24.95	+8.27
Conservative	Elizabeth Thomas	224	15.15	−15.44
Liberal Democrats	Gillian Brown	66	4.46	−0.06
Turnout		1,479	31.72	−6.22
Labour hold				

=== St George West ===
St George West (1 seat)
Party	Candidate	Votes	%	±%
Green	Rob Bryher	1,336	60.77	+31.25
Labour	Carole Anne Johnson	642	28.56	−22.22
Independent	Tony Potter	102	4.54	−0.72
Conservative	Charles Alexander	85	3.78	−5.04
Liberal Democrats	Christopher Featonby	25	1.11	−1.81
TUSC	Paola Sanchez	25	1.11	−0.74
Turnout		2,248	42.0%	−2.66
Green gain from Labour				

=== Stockwood ===
Stockwood (2 seats)
Party	Candidate	Votes	%	±%
Conservative	Graham David Morris*	1,413	57.09	+3.12
Conservative	Jonathan Robert Hucker*	1,287	52.00	+11.53
Labour Co-op	Harry Burnet	693	28.00	−2.98
Labour Co-op	Simon Crew	596	24.08	+7.04
Green	Abigail Galvin	272	10.99	+3.81
Green	Ben Shread-Hewitt	184	7.43	+0.58
Liberal Democrats	Andrew Crow	133	5.37	+0.30
Liberal Democrats	Tamasine Lewis	123	4.97	+0.79
Turnout		2,475	26.34	−9.99
Conservative hold				
Conservative hold				

=== Stoke Bishop ===
Stoke Bishop (2 seats)
Party	Candidate	Votes	%	±%
Conservative	John Goulandris*	1,639	48.33	−4.33
Conservative	Henry Michallat*	1,391	41.02	−0.93
Green	Emily Bradburn	692	20.41	+4.60
Green	Emily Herbert	641	18.90	+3.70
Labour	David Mullaney	618	18.22	+0.75
Liberal Democrats	Rebecca Hutcheon	564	16.63	+5.83
Labour	Barry Trahar	511	15.07	−0.86
Liberal Democrats	Christopher Vyce	477	14.07	+6.95
Turnout		3,391	41.0	−4.35
Conservative hold				
Conservative hold				

=== Westbury-on-Trym & Henleaze ===
Westbury-on-Trym & Henleaze (3 seats)
Party	Candidate	Votes	%	±%
Liberal Democrats	Caroline Gooch	3,401	43.08	+15.25
Liberal Democrats	Stephen Williams	3,095	39.21	+20.92
Liberal Democrats	Nicholas Coombes	3,049	38.62	+23.27
Conservative	Geoff Gollop*	2,599	32.92	−5.59
Conservative	Steve Smith*	2,340	29.64	−3.47
Conservative	Sharon Anne Scott*	2,212	28.02	−2.35
Labour	Miranda McCabe	1,351	17.11	−2.53
Labour	Ellie Milone	1,290	16.34	−2.53
Labour	Thomas Phipps	1,104	13.99	−3.20
Green	Daniella Elsa Radice	1,100	13.93	−6.11
Green	Nathaniel Joyce	830	10.51	−6.93
Green	Murali Thoppil	680	8.61	−8.17
Turnout		7,894	51.67	−5.54
Liberal Democrats gain from Conservative				
Liberal Democrats gain from Conservative				
Liberal Democrats gain from Conservative				

=== Windmill Hill ===
Windmill Hill (2 seats)
Party	Candidate	Votes	%	±%
Green	Lisa Stone*	2,878	62.70	+13.75
Green	Ed Plowden*	2,808	61.18	+15.69
Labour	Susan Murley	1,280	27.89	−9.13
Labour	Charlie Mercer	1,279	27.86	+3.47
Conservative	Ashley Day	162	3.53	−2.90
Conservative	Edmund Hunt	160	3.49	−2.93
Liberal Democrats	Thomas Brooks	127	2.77	−3.04
Liberal Democrats	Timothy Craig	108	2.35	−1.33
TUSC	Robert Nash	84	1.83	+1.83
Turnout		4,590	47.29	−3.68
Green hold				
Green hold				
