= 2021 Bristol City Council election =

2021 UK local government election

- 6 May 2021

All 70 seats to Bristol City Council 36 seats needed for a majority
	First party	Second party
Leader	Eleanor Combley	Craig Cheney
Party	Green	Labour
Leader's seat	Bishopston and Ashley Down	Hillfields
Seats before	11	37
Seats won	24	24
Seat change	▲13	▼13
Popular vote	85,325	85,014
Percentage	31.8%	31.7%
Swing	▲11.9%	▼4.9%
	Third party	Fourth party
Leader	Mark Weston	Gary Hopkins
Party	Conservative	Liberal Democrats
Leader's seat	Henbury and Brentry	Knowle
Seats before	14	8
Seats won	14	8
Seat change	Steady	Steady
Popular vote	56,913	39,480
Percentage	21.3%	14.7%
Swing	▼0.9%	▼2.2%
- Map showing the results of the 2021 Bristol City Council elections. Blue showing Conservative, Green showing Green, Red showing Labour and Yellow showing Liberal Democrats.
Council control before election
Labour
Council control after election
No Overall Control

The 2021 Bristol City Council election took place on 6 May 2021 to elect members of Bristol City Council in England. It coincided with nationwide local elections. Voters in the city also voted for the mayor of Bristol, the mayor of the West of England and for Avon and Somerset's police and crime commissioner. The election was originally due to take place in May 2020, but was postponed due to the COVID-19 pandemic.

The Labour Party, Conservative Party, Green Party and Liberal Democrats all stood full slates of 70 candidates. There were also eight candidates from the Trade Unionist and Socialist Coalition (TUSC), two independent candidates, and one candidate each from Reform UK, the SDP and Burning Pink.

Turnout was lower than in the 2016 Bristol City Council election, with a citywide turnout of 41.04%. Only four wards had a turnout of more than 50% of the electorate, compared to ten wards in 2016. Hartcliffe and Withywood recorded a turnout of 20.34%, the lowest turnout of any ward since Bristol's move to whole council elections.

== Background ==
Since the 2016 local elections, there have been changes to the political make up of the council. In 2016, Labour briefly lost control of the council after suspending three councillors. Labour regained control of the council later that year after it readmitted them. On 24 May 2018, a by-election was held in Westbury-on-Trym and Henleaze ward, resulting in the Conservatives gaining a seat from the Liberal Democrats. On 22 March 2019, the Eastville councillor Sultan Khan resigned from the Labour Party, but continued to represent the ward as an independent before joining the Liberal Democrats. On 17 July 2019, the Brislington East councillor Tony Carey resigned from the Conservative Party, but continued to represent the ward as an independent before joining the Liberal Democrats A by-election took place in Brislington East on 16 January 2020 after the death of the Labour councillor Mike Langley. The by-election was won by the Labour candidate Tim Rippington. On 23 March 2021, the Labour councillor Jo Sergeant defected to the Green Party.

In preparation for the election, political parties went through their selection processes. The Conservative Party faced controversy after the party deselected Peter Abraham, the council's longest serving councillor who had first been elected in 1966 for the Stockwood ward. The local party did not state a reason for this decision. Labour Party selection processes, which are normally overseen by local party officials, were taken over by paid officials from the South West Labour Party Regional Office, who removed and banned candidates in several key wards, resulting in resignations by local volunteer members. The Labour group in the city saw seventeen of its backbench councillors standing down; twenty councillors, including all of the cabinet, are seeking re-election.

For the candidates for the mayoral election, Marvin Rees was re-selected as Labour's candidate; Sandy Hore-Ruthven was announced as the Green party's candidate, Caroline Gooch from the Liberal Democrats and Samuel Williams was initially selected as the Conservative candidate. Williams subsequently decided to stand down as the Conservative candidate, choosing instead to run in the regional West of England mayoral election. Alastair Watson, a former city councillor, stood for the Conservatives in place of Williams.

== Campaign ==
Conservative mayoral candidate Williams was critical of Rees's pursuit of Bristol Energy, a council-run energy company and the ambition of constructing underground transport for the city. Both the Conservatives and the Liberal Democrats campaigned to scrap the post of elected mayor.

== Council composition ==
Prior to the 2021 election, the composition of the council was:

↓
37	14	11	8
Labour	Conservative	Green	Lib Dems

After the 2021 election, the composition of the council was:

↓
24	24	14	8
Green	Labour	Conservative	Lib Dems

== Summary ==
=== Election result ===
The Greens and Labour each won 24 seats out of 70.

2021 Bristol City Council election
Party	Candidates	Seats	Gains	Losses	Net gain/loss	Seats %	Votes %	Votes	+/−
Labour	70	24	2	15	▼13	34.3	31.9	85,668	–4.7
Green	70	24	13	0	▲13	34.3	31.7	85,092	+11.8
Conservative	70	14	2	2	Steady	20.0	21.2	56,913	–1.0
Liberal Democrats	70	8	2	2	Steady	11.4	14.7	39,480	–2.2
TUSC	8	0	0	0	Steady	0.0	0.3	814	–0.7
Independent	2	0	0	0	Steady	0.0	0.1	318	–0.7
SDP	1	0	0	0	Steady	0.0	<0.1	112	N/A
Burning Pink	1	0	0	0	Steady	0.0	<0.1	90	N/A
Reform	1	0	0	0	Steady	0.0	<0.1	36	N/A

== Ward results ==
=== Ashley ===
Ashley (3 seats)
Party	Candidate	Votes	%	±%
Green	Tim Wye	3,820	55.39	+17.16
Labour	Amirah Cole	2,957	42.88	+3.58
Green	Jude English	2,257	39.98	+4.08
Green	Will Mountford	2,096	30.39	+0.48
Labour	Sibusiso Tshabalala	2,091	30.32	−8.94
Conservative	Marcus Bruton	1,764	25.58	+22.11
Labour	Carole Johnson	1,468	21.29	−10.81
Liberal Democrats	Ian Harris	1,157	16.78	−2.14
Liberal Democrats	Tara Murray	973	14.11	+3.76
Conservative	James Mills	920	13.34	+10.47
Liberal Democrats	Robert Bristow	228	3.31	−5.38
Conservative	Oscar Lucas	218	3.16	+0.41
TUSC	Chris Farrell	204	2.96	−3.32
Independent	Robbie Bentley	196	2.84	+2.84
Turnout		6,896	48.37	−3.01
Green gain from Labour				
Labour hold				
Green hold				

=== Avonmouth and Lawrence Weston ===
Avonmouth and Lawrence Weston (3 seats)
Party	Candidate	Votes	%	±%
Labour	Don Alexander	1,695	32.86	−2.54
Conservative	John Geater	1,563	30.30	−1.60
Conservative	James Scott	1,550	30.05	+9.93
Green	Jo Sergeant	1,534	29.74	+23.85
Labour	Daphne Chikwere	1,481	28.71	+3.96
Conservative	Rekha Rao-Nicholson	1,261	24.45	+5.91
Labour	Matt Palmer	1,219	23.63	+3.26
Green	Jackie Walkden	837	16.23	+10.41
Green	Robert Triggs	717	13.90	+8.58
Liberal Democrats	Ian Campion-Smith	339	6.57	−7.31
Liberal Democrats	Neil Harvie	271	5.25	−4.36
Liberal Democrats	Charles Gunter	266	5.16	−4.12
Turnout		5,158	32.51	−6.43
Labour hold				
Conservative hold				
Conservative gain from Labour				

=== Bedminster ===
Bedminster (2 seats)
Party	Candidate	Votes	%	±%
Green	Tessa Fitzjohn	1,728	38.75	+9.71
Labour	Mark Bradshaw	1,715	38.69	−12.75
Labour	Celia Phipps	1,688	37.86	+1.02
Green	Louis Williams	1,111	24.92	+5.49
Conservative	Gerard Calderbank	688	15.43	+1.65
Conservative	Rajesh Joseph	458	10.27	−3.41
Liberal Democrats	Alex Birrell	234	5.25	−2.30
Liberal Democrats	Fergus Ustianowski	149	3.34	−0.02
Turnout		4,459	44.82	−12.13
Green gain from Labour				
Labour hold				

=== Bishopston & Ashley Down ===
Bishopston & Ashley Down (2 seats)
Party	Candidate	Votes	%	±%
Green	Emma Edwards	2,766	52.68	+16.11
Green	Lily Fitzgibbon	2,395	45.61	+9.41
Labour	Eileen Means	1,423	27.10	−9.47
Labour	Joe Rayment	1,382	26.32	+0.82
Liberal Democrats	Becky Lockyer	654	12.45	−6.35
Liberal Democrats	Phil Kemp	603	11.48	−6.58
Conservative	Tony Holdsworth	336	6.40	−2.04
Conservative	Adam Brown	329	6.27	−0.57
Turnout		5,251	55.68	−1.27
Green gain from Labour				
Green hold				

=== Bishopsworth ===
Bishopsworth (2 seats)
Party	Candidate	Votes	%	±%
Conservative	Richard Eddy	1,575	48.49	−7.27
Conservative	Kevin Quartley	1,196	36.82	−0.97
Labour	Jaime Breitnauer	879	27.06	+0.95
Labour	Bianca Rossetti	736	22.66	+0.95
Green	Kristian Dainton	414	12.75	+3.53
Green	Alex Smith	360	11.08	+2.71
Liberal Democrats	Mary Sykes	256	7.88	+1.30
Liberal Democrats	Joshua Warwick-Smith	56	1.72	−1.60
Turnout		3,248	34.80	−6.02
Conservative hold				
Conservative hold				

=== Brislington East ===
Brislington East (2 seats)
Party	Candidate	Votes	%	±%
Labour	Tim Rippington	1,282	37.77	−0.51
Labour	Katja Hornchen	1,116	32.88	+3.26
Conservative	Melissa Groves	732	21.57	−12.18
Liberal Democrats	Tony Carey	710	20.92	+11.36
Green	David Megson-Smith	591	17.41	+5.14
Conservative	Nura Aabe	534	15.73	−14.22
Green	Jason Truelove	388	11.43	+0.56
Liberal Democrats	Mohammad Ainul Islam	265	7.81	−1.21
Turnout		3,394	37.12	−3.30
Labour hold				
Labour gain from Conservative				

=== Brislington West ===
Brislington West (2 seats)
Party	Candidate	Votes	%	±%
Liberal Democrats	Jos Clark	1,883	44.40	+4.01
Liberal Democrats	Andrew John Varney	1,494	35.23	+4.09
Labour	Carolyn Magson	1,331	31.38	−1.72
Labour	Rob Logan	1,028	24.24	+0.75
Green	Tom Chudley-Evans	663	15.63	−2.17
Green	Jim Mayger	466	10.99	−0.74
Conservative	Martin Christopher Liner	379	8.94	−3.80
Conservative	Vicki Kathleen Liner	349	8.23	−4.28
Turnout		4,241	46.16	+0.61
Liberal Democrats hold				
Liberal Democrats gain from Labour				

=== Central ===
Central (2 seats)
Party	Candidate	Votes	%	±%
Green	Ani Stafford-Townsend	1,316	40.13	+7.78
Labour	Farah Hussain	1,078	32.88	−7.45
Labour	Kye Daniel Dudd	1,064	32.45	−0.17
Green	Simon Ingham Stafford-Townsend	985	30.04	+5.65
Conservative	Richard Leslie Clifton	413	12.60	−1.23
Liberal Democrats	Jen Smith	373	11.38	−2.60
Conservative	David John Kibble	360	10.98	−1.24
Liberal Democrats	Zac Barker	300	9.15	−3.45
Turnout		3,279	29.52	−5.98
Green gain from Labour				
Labour hold				

=== Clifton ===
Clifton (2 seats)
Party	Candidate	Votes	%	±%
Green	Katy Grant	2,444	51.08	+14.46
Green	Paula Bernadette O’Rourke	2,304	48.15	+15.31
Labour	Raven Piers Hart	911	19.04	−3.90
Labour	Paul Alan Ville	698	14.59	−0.40
Conservative	Simon Paul Davies	648	13.54	−16.81
Conservative	Charles James Hastings Lucas	646	13.50	−8.11
Liberal Democrats	Nicholas John Coombes	623	13.02	−1.52
Liberal Democrats	Johnny Palmer	469	9.80	+1.41
Turnout		4,785	48.57	−3.67
Green hold				
Green hold				

=== Clifton Down ===
Clifton Down (2 seats)
Party	Candidate	Votes	%	±%
Green	Carla Suzanne Denyer	2,458	60.26	+26.83
Green	Tom Hathway	1,752	42.95	+16.29
Labour	Elliott Jacob Callender	880	21.57	−4.83
Labour	Teresa Ann Stratford	654	16.03	−4.37
Conservative	Jude Fabio D'Alesio	449	11.01	−9.63
Liberal Democrats	Merche Clark	445	10.91	−7.02
Liberal Democrats	Laura Kirsten Barry	428	10.49	−5.65
Conservative	Edward Alexander De'Mayene Gibson	397	9.73	−7.98
Turnout		4,079	46.09	−1.40
Green hold				
Green hold				

=== Cotham ===
Cotham (2 seats)
Party	Candidate	Votes	%	±%
Green	Mohamed Alaaeldin Yousif Makawi	2,056	49.58	+15.51
Green	Guy James Baiden Poultney	1,841	44.39	+15.33
Liberal Democrats	Anthony Leonard Negus	1,204	29.03	−1.91
Liberal Democrats	Phyllis Iris Ella Rayner	742	17.89	−3.25
Labour	Dylan James Woodward	699	16.86	−12.76
Labour	Matthew Paul Redmore	642	15.48	−7.87
Conservative	Caroline Mary Lucas	339	8.17	−2.88
Conservative	George Scott Day	213	5.14	−3.14
Reform	Rob Clarke	36	0.87	+0.87
Turnout		4,147	48.08	−2.74
Green hold				
Green gain from Liberal Democrats				

=== Easton ===
Easton (2 seats)
Party	Candidate	Votes	%	±%
Green	Jenny Bartle	2,259	44.64	+9.06
Green	Barry William Parsons	1,960	38.73	+4.44
Labour	Debra Jane Newrick	1,742	34.42	−5.29
Labour	Afzal Shah	1,739	34.36	−4.98
Liberal Democrats	Pauline Mary Allen	387	7.65	+1.24
Conservative	Joanne Sara McCready	316	6.24	+1.75
Liberal Democrats	Paul Elvin	292	5.77	−0.09
Conservative	Roger Keith Jones	249	4.92	+1.32
Turnout		5,061	48.93	−2.37
Green gain from Labour				
Green gain from Labour				

=== Eastville ===
Eastville (2 seats)
Party	Candidate	Votes	%	±%
Labour	Marley Chad Bennett	1,763	37.61	−14.54
Green	Lorraine Francis	1,632	34.82	+17.98
Labour	Sangeetha Morenike Wynter	1,269	27.07	−19.18
Green	Justin Quinnell	1,170	24.96	+24.96
Liberal Democrats	Sultan Mahmud Khan	690	14.72	+0.16
Conservative	Leigh Dennis Joseph Cooper	526	11.22	−3.76
Conservative	Jacob Anstey	466	9.94	+0.21
Liberal Democrats	Mohammad Abdur Rashid	369	7.87	+0.79
TUSC	Mike Luff	150	3.20	−3.35
Turnout		4,687	42.96	−1.50
Labour hold				
Green gain from Labour				

=== Filwood ===
Filwood (2 seats)
Party	Candidate	Votes	%	±%
Labour	Zoe Goodman	1,023	39.95	−20.35
Labour	Chris Jackson	947	36.98	−10.63
Green	Harriet Hansen	546	21.32	+5.98
Green	Barney Smith	461	18.00	+18.00
Conservative	Sylvia Christine Windows	446	17.42	+7.23
Conservative	Jojimon Kuriakose	310	12.10	+3.48
Liberal Democrats	Jackie Norman	197	7.69	−0.93
Liberal Democrats	Crispin Allard	138	5.39	+0.39
TUSC	Robin Victor Clapp	116	4.53	−3.72
Turnout		2,561	25.45	−3.97
Labour hold				
Labour hold				

=== Frome Vale ===
Frome Vale (2 seats)
Party	Candidate	Votes	%	±%
Labour	Amal Ali	1,521	39.04	+1.57
Conservative	Lesley Alexander	1,266	32.49	−10.03
Labour	Mike Wollacott	1,102	28.29	−2.33
Conservative	Pooja Poddar	729	18.71	−13.47
Green	Jesse Meadows	721	18.51	+3.44
Green	Ed Fraser	716	18.38	+8.95
Liberal Democrats	Bev Knott	215	5.52	−0.33
Liberal Democrats	Keith Fenner	201	5.16	+1.36
SDP	Tommy Trueman	112	2.87	+2.87
Turnout		3,896	39.25	−5.89
Conservative hold				
Labour hold				

=== Hartcliffe & Withywood ===
Hartcliffe & Withywood (3 seats)
Party	Candidate	Votes	%	±%
Labour	Kerry Johanna Bailes	1,024	38.42	−14.21
Labour	Helen Holland	1,021	38.31	−11.24
Labour	Paul Goggin	782	29.34	−10.45
Conservative	Daniel Thomas Bond	756	28.37	+13.01
Conservative	Ann-Marie Mason	669	25.10	+12.96
Conservative	Keith Ronald Taplin	645	24.20	+12.96
Green	Sam Marshall Evans	334	12.53	+1.44
Liberal Democrats	Gary Dean Perry	289	10.84	+6.08
Green	Jasmine Tribe	267	10.02	+10.02
Green	Alexander Sinclair-Lack	252	9.46	+9.46
Liberal Democrats	Jack Hibbins	150	5.63	+2.20
Liberal Democrats	Matthew Roberts	143	5.37	+2.20
Turnout		2,665	20.34	−6.97
Labour hold				
Labour hold				
Labour hold				

=== Henbury & Brentry ===
Henbury & Brentry (2 seats)
Party	Candidate	Votes	%	±%
Conservative	Mark Roscoe Weston	1,880	52.60	+4.18
Conservative	Chris Windows	1,280	35.81	−3.19
Labour	Teresa Hogan	994	27.81	−6.33
Labour	David Mullaney	881	24.65	−2.46
Green	Alice Clevely	476	13.32	+4.42
Green	Simeon Roswell	291	8.14	+2.56
Liberal Democrats	Jerry Sandford	218	6.10	−0.63
Liberal Democrats	Bill Oates	157	4.39	−0.39
TUSC	Amy Gwen Sage	57	1.59	+1.59
Turnout		3,574	36.95	−2.78
Conservative hold				
Conservative hold				

=== Hengrove & Whitchurch Park ===
Hengrove & Whitchurch Park (3 seats)
Party	Candidate	Votes	%	±%
Liberal Democrats	Tim Kent	2,641	55.20	+8.45
Liberal Democrats	Andrew Brown	1,861	38.90	+8.60
Liberal Democrats	Sarah Classick	1,844	38.55	+11.55
Conservative	Karen Brown	1,307	27.32	+14.36
Conservative	Edmund Hunt	838	17.52	+7.36
Conservative	Daniel Fear	802	16.76	+6.78
Labour	Caroline Jenkins	740	15.47	−17.16
Labour	Rory Casey	670	14.01	−2.74
Labour	Martin Golding	541	11.31	−3.46
Green	Lela McTernan	347	7.25	+2.47
Green	Tabitha Stanmore	255	5.33	+5.33
Green	Max Thrower	197	4.12	+4.12
Turnout		4,784	34.17	−5.50
Liberal Democrats hold				
Liberal Democrats gain from Labour				
Liberal Democrats hold				

=== Hillfields ===
Hillfields (2 seats)
Party	Candidate	Votes	%	±%
Labour	Craig Cheney	1,367	43.40	−2.84
Labour	Ellie King	1,255	39.84	−1.18
Conservative	Charles Alexander	690	21.90	+6.77
Green	Lisa Calder	620	19.68	+5.90
Green	Rick Lovering	557	17.68	+17.68
Conservative	James Hinchcliffe	511	16.22	+4.61
Liberal Democrats	Anna Fry	192	6.10	+0.76
Liberal Democrats	Sundar Ali	180	5.71	+2.10
Turnout		3,150	34.27	−4.15
Labour hold				
Labour hold				

=== Horfield ===
Horfield (2 seats)
Party	Candidate	Votes	%	±%
Labour	Philippa Mary Hulme	1,689	40.72	+0.53
Labour	Tom Renhard	1,203	29.00	−0.51
Conservative	Claire Hiscott	985	23.75	−5.76
Green	Anna Meares	944	22.76	+7.36
Conservative	Jack Emsley	824	19.86	−8.54
Liberal Democrats	Tracey O'Reilly	641	15.45	+5.84
Liberal Democrats	Michael O'Shea	632	15.24	+7.85
Green	Isaac Price-Sosner	512	12.34	−2.00
Turnout		4,148	42.62	−1.00
Labour hold				
Labour gain from Conservative				

=== Hotwells & Harbourside ===
Hotwells & Harbourside (1 seat)
Party	Candidate	Votes	%	±%
Liberal Democrats	Alex Hartley	651	32.90	−0.77
Green	Heulwen Flower	625	31.58	+7.20
Labour	Henry Palmer	496	25.06	+2.95
Conservative	Julian Ellacott	182	9.20	−6.50
Turnout		1,979	45.62	−0.78
Liberal Democrats hold				

=== Knowle ===
Knowle (2 seats)
Party	Candidate	Votes	%	±%
Liberal Democrats	Chris Davies	1,677	38.86	−9.22
Liberal Democrats	Gary Hopkins	1,648	38.19	−9.38
Labour	Brandon Rhys Gage	1,085	25.14	−4.37
Labour	Michele Madeleine Tedder	1,006	23.31	+0.58
Green	Natasha Kiran Clarke	921	21.34	+9.97
Green	Patrick McAllister	542	12.56	+5.14
Conservative	Jenny Rogers	371	8.60	+2.68
Conservative	Diane Gilpin	293	6.79	+1.45
TUSC	Domenico William Hill	82	1.90	−0.13
Turnout		4,315	43.02	−3.81
Liberal Democrats hold				
Liberal Democrats hold				

=== Lawrence Hill ===
Lawrence Hill (2 seats)
Party	Candidate	Votes	%	±%
Labour	Hibaq Abdi Jama	1,793	41.07	−13.56
Green	Yassin Hassan Mohamud	1,675	38.36	+19.59
Green	Jon Eccles	1,456	33.35	+16.58
Labour	Shona deForde Jemphrey	1,398	32.02	−19.28
Conservative	Kathryn Anne Johnson	229	5.25	−1.96
Conservative	Deirdre Allison Judge	194	4.44	+1.36
Liberal Democrats	Jessica Evelyn McKenzie	166	3.80	−3.12
Liberal Democrats	Harry Bradbury	156	3.57	−1.23
Turnout		4,366	37.24	−3.75
Labour hold				
Green gain from Labour				

=== Lockleaze ===
Lockleaze (2 seats)
Party	Candidate	Votes	%	±%
Green	Heather Mack	1,490	42.47	+23.02
Green	David Wilcox	1,212	34.55	+34.55
Labour	Aadayaamelika Adlam	1,145	32.64	−20.72
Labour	Theresa Jane Allain	1,111	31.67	−13.69
Conservative	Nigel Paul Brown	444	12.66	−3.48
Conservative	George William Pendrill Maggs	361	10.29	−1.46
Liberal Democrats	Maz Choudhury	191	5.44	−3.08
Liberal Democrats	Graham Christopher Donald	129	3.68	−4.05
TUSC	Roger Stephen Thomas	107	3.05	−3.64
Turnout		3,508	37.28	−2.78
Green gain from Labour				
Green gain from Labour				

=== Redland ===
Redland (2 seats)
Party	Candidate	Votes	%	±%
Green	Fi Hance	3,286	55.72	+17.43
Green	Martin Fodor	3,041	51.57	+13.53
Labour	Kirsten Nicola Malcolm	1,590	26.96	−2.39
Labour	Andrew Milton	1,138	19.30	−2.70
Conservative	Richard James Manns	570	9.67	−5.78
Conservative	Malcolm Frederick Ravenscroft	478	8.11	−5.96
Liberal Democrats	Rebecca Louise Hutcheon	455	7.72	−6.17
Liberal Democrats	James Anthony Wetz	406	6.88	−6.07
Turnout		5,897	56.47	−0.47
Green hold				
Green hold				

=== Southmead ===
Southmead (2 seats)
Party	Candidate	Votes	%	±%
Labour	Helen Jayne Godwin Tiege	1,147	44.65	−2.65
Labour	Brenda Margaret Massey	1,060	41.26	−1.80
Conservative	James Anthony Martin	748	29.12	+13.68
Conservative	Roddy Jaques	622	24.21	+11.75
Green	Clare Hartland	499	19.42	+10.71
Green	Serena Kate Ralston	370	14.40	+14.40
Liberal Democrats	Clare Campion-Smith	266	10.35	+0.35
Liberal Democrats	Gill Brooks	188	7.32	−1.58
Turnout		2,569	31.28	−4.25
Labour hold				
Labour hold				

=== Southville ===
Southville (2 seats)
Party	Candidate	Votes	%	±%
Green	Tony Dyer	2,393	49.37	+3.39
Green	Christine Charlotte Townsend	1,867	38.52	+1.64
Labour	Lisa Ann Durston	1,781	36.74	+0.20
Labour	Thomas Phipps	1,630	33.63	−0.71
Conservative	Iain Jenkins Dennis	370	7.63	−2.65
Conservative	James Callum MacQueen	276	5.69	−1.11
Liberal Democrats	Lena Clare Wright	228	4.70	−1.20
Liberal Democrats	Sam Merchant	182	3.75	−0.56
Turnout		4,847	49.72	−3.48
Green hold				
Green hold				

=== St George Central ===
St George Central (2 seats)
Party	Candidate	Votes	%	±%
Labour	Nicola Anne Beech	1,676	49.29	−4.87
Labour	Steve Pearce	996	29.29	−5.95
Green	Georgia Nelson	817	24.03	+9.31
Conservative	Anthony Paul Lee	691	20.32	+1.75
Conservative	Laura Saunders	682	20.06	+1.81
Green	Patrick John Toland	417	12.26	+12.26
Liberal Democrats	Chris Featonby	280	8.24	−1.75
Liberal Democrats	Tina Kaulbach	155	4.56	−4.75
Turnout		3,400	34.32	−2.03
Labour hold				
Labour hold				

=== St George Troopers Hill ===
St George Troopers Hill (1 seat)
Party	Candidate	Votes	%	±%
Labour Co-op	Fabian Guy Breckels	824	46.58	−0.64
Conservative	Kevin Robert Rainey	541	30.58	−2.75
Green	Tom Cuthbertson	294	16.62	+7.88
Liberal Democrats	Adam Alexander Raphael	80	4.52	−2.37
Turnout		1,769	37.94	−6.32
Labour hold				

=== St George West ===
St George West (1 seat)
Party	Candidate	Votes	%	±%
Labour	Asher Craig	1,180	50.77	+8.52
Green	Anna Bryher	686	29.52	+10.04
Conservative	Nick Hiscott	205	8.82	+0.91
Independent	Tony Potter	122	5.25	−3.82
Liberal Democrats	Simon Guilbert King	68	2.93	−15.58
TUSC	Chris Parry	43	1.85	−0.93
Turnout		2,324	44.66	−1.34
Labour hold				

=== Stockwood ===
Stockwood (2 seats)
Party	Candidate	Votes	%	±%
Conservative	Graham David Morris	1,796	53.97	+11.17
Conservative	Jonathan Robert Hucker	1,347	40.47	−1.96
Labour Co-op	Samuel John Fox	1,031	30.98	−1.84
Labour Co-op	Justin William Ibbett	567	17.04	−12.86
Green	Stephen Lloyd	239	7.18	−1.18
Green	Jaz Fryer-Jones	228	6.85	−0.50
Liberal Democrats	Thomas Harry Brooks	169	5.08	−0.07
Liberal Democrats	Benjamin Goldstrom	139	4.18	−0.33
Turnout		3,328	36.33	−4.91
Conservative hold				
Conservative hold				

=== Stoke Bishop ===
Stoke Bishop (2 seats)
Party	Candidate	Votes	%	±%
Conservative	John Goulandris	2,242	52.67	+2.07
Conservative	Henry Michallat	1,786	41.95	−1.63
Labour	Mohammed Omer	744	17.48	+1.51
Labour	James Henry Lavington Wood	678	15.93	+3.03
Green	Poppy Silk	673	15.81	+5.79
Green	Luke Cox	647	15.20	+8.10
Liberal Democrats	Timothy James Leaman	460	10.81	−3.01
Liberal Democrats	Nwakasi Belisle-Nweke	303	7.12	−4.63
TUSC	Kyle Philip Walker	55	1.29	+1.29
Turnout		4,257	45.35	−6.30
Conservative hold				
Conservative hold				

=== Westbury-on-Trym & Henleaze ===
Westbury-on-Trym & Henleaze (3 seats)
Party	Candidate	Votes	%	±%
Conservative	Geoff Gollop	3,389	38.51	−5.52
Conservative	Steve Smith	2,914	33.11	−7.24
Conservative	Sharon Anne Scott	2,673	30.38	−4.76
Liberal Democrats	Caroline Gooch	2,449	27.83	−8.07
Green	Georgia Barnes	1,764	20.05	+5.75
Labour	Lesley Miranda McCabe	1,729	19.65	+2.24
Liberal Democrats	Simon Cook	1,609	18.28	−7.82
Labour	Sam Taylor-Elliott	1,580	17.95	+4.45
Green	Alex Dunn	1,535	17.44	+3.14
Labour	Simon Mark Geoffrey Crew	1,512	17.18	+3.70
Green	Robin Coode	1,477	16.78	+16.78
Liberal Democrats	Christopher Harris	1,351	15.35	−5.32
Turnout		8,800	57.21	−3.35
Conservative hold				
Conservative hold				
Conservative gain from Liberal Democrats				

=== Windmill Hill ===
Windmill Hill (2 seats)
Party	Candidate	Votes	%	±%
Green	Ed Plowden	2,655	48.95	+17.13
Green	Lisa Stone	2,467	45.48	+18.80
Labour	Aileen McLoughlin	2,008	37.02	+0.28
Labour	Ted Powell	1,323	24.39	−8.68
Conservative	Daniel Tristan Ford Angell	349	6.43	−0.13
Conservative	Anthony Frederick Scrase	348	6.41	+1.27
Liberal Democrats	Finn Conway	315	5.81	−14.79
Liberal Democrats	Vitor Manuel Brandao Moreira Da Silva	200	3.69	−13.78
Burning Pink	Rachel Lunnon	90	1.66	+1.66
Turnout		5,424	50.97	−0.02
Green gain from Labour				
Green gain from Labour				

== Changes 2021–2024 ==
- Chris Davies and Gary Hopkins, both elected as Liberal Democrats, left the party on 13 December 2021 to form the Knowle Community Party.

=== Southmead ===
The Southmead by-election was triggered following the stepping down of Helen Godwin over time constraint alongside her other job.

Southmead: 17 February 2022
Party	Candidate	Votes	%	±%
Labour	Kye Dudd	780	41.2	−1.9
Green	Edward Burnham	728	38.5	+19.7
Conservative	Roddy Jaques	279	14.8	−13.4
Liberal Democrats	Gill Brooks	82	4.3	−5.7
TUSC	Tom Baldwin	22	1.2	N/A
Majority		52	2.7	
Turnout		1,891	21.2	
Labour hold		Swing	▼10.8	

=== Hotwells & Harbourside ===
The Hotwells and Harbourside by-election was triggered following the stepping down of Alex Hartley over health concerns. At the time of this by-election, both Labour and Green Party held 24 seats on Bristol Council, making them the joint-largest parties. The Green gain in this by-election meant the Greens became the largest group on the council.

Hotwells & Harbourside: 2 February 2023
Party	Candidate	Votes	%	±%
Green	Patrick McAllister	537	43.0	+11.0
Liberal Democrats	Stephen Williams	511	40.9	+7.6
Labour	Beryl Eileen Means	153	12.2	−13.1
Conservative	Eliana Barbosa	34	2.7	−6.6
Independent	Martin Booth (withdrawn)	14	1.1	N/A
Majority		26	2.1	
Turnout		1,249		
Green gain from Liberal Democrats		Swing	▲12.1	

=== Bishopston and Ashley Down ===
The Bishopston and Ashley Down by-election was triggered following the stepping down of Lily Fitzgibbon due to her moving away from the area.

Southmead: 24 August 2023
Party	Candidate	Votes	%	±%
Green	James Daniel Crawford	1,294	50.2	−2.0
Labour	Andrew Milton	981	38.1	+9.7
Conservative	Roddy Jaques	91	3.5	−3.2
Liberal Democrats	John Cash	184	7.1	−5.6
TUSC	Gwen Sage	26	1.0	N/A
Majority		313	12.2	
Turnout		2,576	29.2	
Green hold		Swing	▼5.8	

- On 12 December 2023, Labour councillor for Filwood, Zoe Goodman, resigned from the party over its response to what she called "the genocide in Gaza", becoming an Independent councillor.
- In March 2024, the Green Party suspended one of their councillors for Ashley, Jude English, pending investigation of a complaint against her.
