= 2011 Bristol City Council election =

2011 UK local government election

- 5 May 2011

24 of 70 seats (One Third) to Bristol City Council 36 seats needed for a majority
	First party	Second party	Third party
Party	Liberal Democrats	Labour	Conservative
Seats won	33	21	14
Seat change	▼5	▲4	Steady
Popular vote	21,682	31,176	18,215
Percentage	24.90%	35.79%	20.91%
Swing	▼9.38%	▲9.00%	▼6.31%
	Fourth party
Party	Green
Seats won	2
Seat change	▲1
Popular vote	12,535
Percentage	14.39%
Swing	▲6.46%
Council control before election
Liberal Democrats
Council control after election
No Overall Control

The 2011 Bristol City Council elections were held in the city of Bristol, in South West England on Thursday 5 May 2011, for 24 seats, that being one third of the total number of councillors. (Note: All locally registered electors (British, Irish, Commonwealth and European Union citizens) who were aged 18 or over on Thursday 2 May 2013 were entitled to vote in the local elections. Those who were temporarily away from their ordinary address (for example, away working, on holiday, in student accommodation or in hospital) were also entitled to vote in the local elections, although those who had moved abroad and registered as overseas electors cannot vote in the local elections. It is possible to register to vote at more than one address (such as a university student who had a term-time address and lives at home during holidays) at the discretion of the local Electoral Register Office, but it remains an offence to vote more than once in the same local government election.) The Liberal Democrats, who had won overall control of the council in 2009 and increased their majority in 2010, experienced a drop in support and lost 5 seats; 4 to the Labour Party and 1 to the Green Party, which gained its second ever council seat in Bristol. This meant that the Lib Dems no longer had a majority on the council. However, they continued to run the council, relying on opposition groups to vote through any proposal.

Party	2010 Cllrs	Net Gain/Loss	2011 Cllrs
Conservative	14	-	14
Green	1	+1	2
Labour	17	+4	21
Liberal Democrats	38	-5	33
Total	70	-	70

2011 local election results in Bristol

== Ward results ==
Bristol Council composition following the 2011 local elections

=== Ashley ===
Bristol City Council Elections: Ashley Ward 2011
Party	Candidate	Votes	%	±%
Green	Gus Hoyt	2,206	42.65	+11.62
Liberal Democrats	Waliur Rahman	1,432	27.69	−20.15
Labour	Thangam Debbonaire	1,302	25.17	+12.06
Conservative	Graham Roger Godwin Pearson	232	4.49	−0.50
Majority		774	14.96	−1.85
Green gain from Liberal Democrats		Swing	+15.89	

=== Bedminster ===
Bristol City Council Elections: Bedminster Ward 2011
Party	Candidate	Votes	%	±%
Labour	Colin John Smith	1,694	40.93	+8.21
Liberal Democrats	Ian Robert Cooper	839	20.27	−8.98
Conservative	Doug Newton	749	18.10	−3.57
Green	Cath Slade	621	15.00	+5.39
TUSC	Robin Victor Clapp	125	3.02	N/A
English Democrat	Jon Baker	111	2.68	N/A
Majority		855	20.66	17.19
Labour hold		Swing	+8.60	

=== Bishopsworth ===
Bristol City Council Elections: Bishopsworth Ward 2011
Party	Candidate	Votes	%	±%
Conservative	Richard Stephen Eddy	1,606	51.52	+11.20
Labour	Darren Eurwyn Lewis	1,126	36.12	+1.91
Green	Barrie Robert Lewis	279	8.95	+1.40
Liberal Democrats	Ian Humfrey Campion-Smith	106	3.40	−14.52
Majority		480	15.40	+9.29
Conservative hold		Swing	+4.65	

=== Brislington East ===
Bristol City Council Elections: Brislington East Ward 2011
Party	Candidate	Votes	%	±%
Labour	Mike Langley	1,383	39.46	+7.11
Conservative	Lara Cozens	1,224	34.92	+3.42
Liberal Democrats	Pauline Mary Allen	374	10.67	−12.86
Green	Robin Whitlock	270	7.70	+3.26
UKIP	Mark Stanley Smith	218	6.22	N/A
TUSC	Martyn Ahmet	36	1.03	N/A
Majority		159	4.54	+3.69
Labour hold		Swing	+1.85	

=== Brislington West ===
Bristol City Council Elections: Brislington West Ward 2011
Party	Candidate	Votes	%	±%
Liberal Democrats	Jackie Norman	1,123	32.34	−5.47
Labour	Liam John McDonough	1,068	30.75	+6.73
Conservative	Colin Robert Bretherton	663	19.09	−5.71
UKIP	Philip John Collins	336	9.67	N/A
Green	Lucy MacKilligin	247	7.11	+1.02
TUSC	John Mark Yeandle	36	1.04	N/A
Majority		55	1.59	−11.42
Liberal Democrats hold		Swing	-6.10	

=== Cabot ===
Bristol City Council Elections: Cabot Ward 2011
Party	Candidate	Votes	%	±%
Liberal Democrats	Alex Woodman	1,441	37.45	−10.17
Labour	Ben Mosley	936	24.32	+10.44
Green	Ben Appleby	739	19.20	−2.24
Conservative	Iain Jenkins Dennis	647	16.81	−0.25
TUSC	Chris Farrell	85	2.21	N/A
Majority		505	13.13	−13.05
Liberal Democrats hold		Swing	-10.31	

=== Clifton ===
Bristol City Council Elections: Clifton Ward 2011
Party	Candidate	Votes	%	±%
Liberal Democrats	Barbara Lilian Janke	1,661	39.87	−2.59
Conservative	Charles James Hastings Lucas	987	23.69	−3.50
Green	Georgina Mary Bavetta	807	19.37	0.61
Labour	Rosemary Patricia Chamberlin	678	16.27	+4.67
TUSC	Jack Jeffery	33	0.79	N/A
Majority		674	16.18	+0.91
Liberal Democrats hold		Swing	+0.46	

=== Clifton East ===
Bristol City Council Elections: Clifton East Ward 2011
Party	Candidate	Votes	%	±%
Liberal Democrats	Christian Martin	1,191	34.94	−13.01
Conservative	Marcus Bruton	1,040	30.51	−1.58
Labour	Charlotte Elisabeth Martin	670	19.65	+11.74
Green	Simon James Bennett	461	13.52	+1.47
TUSC	Patrick Burland	47	1.38	N/A
Majority		151	4.43	−11.43
Liberal Democrats hold		Swing	-5.72	

=== Cotham ===
Bristol City Council Elections: Cotham Ward 2011
Party	Candidate	Votes	%	±%
Liberal Democrats	Neil Robert Harrison	1,694	40.29	−4.60
Labour	Estella Jane Tincknell	889	21.14	+7.37
Green	Graham Woodruff	833	19.81	−3.01
Conservative	Gareth Alan-Williams	732	17.41	−1.11
TUSC	Amy Hillgrove	57	1.36	N/A
Majority		805	19.15	−2.92
Liberal Democrats hold		Swing	-5.99	

=== Easton ===
Bristol City Council Elections: Easton Ward 2011
Party	Candidate	Votes	%	±%
Labour	Faruk Choudhury	1,501	37.97	+7.49
Liberal Democrats	Zahir Malik	1,097	27.75	−7.49
Green	Katie Buse	1,075	27.19	+1.57
Conservative	David Thomas Harrison Lewis	280	7.08	+1.07
Majority		404	10.22	+5.46
Labour hold		Swing	+7.49	

=== Eastville ===
Bristol City Council Elections: Eastville Ward 2011
Party	Candidate	Votes	%	±%
Labour	Mahmadur Khan	1,457	39.75	+15.81
Liberal Democrats	Muriel Cole	1,065	29.06	−14.68
Conservative	Nazir Muhammad	635	17.33	−0.77
Green	Josephine McLellan	386	10.53	−3.69
TUSC	Roger Stephen Thomas	122	3.33	N/A
Majority		392	10.69	−9.11
Labour gain from Liberal Democrats		Swing	+15.25	

=== Filwood ===
Bristol City Council Elections: Filwood Ward 2011
Party	Candidate	Votes	%	±%
Labour	Jeff Lovell	1,400	63.84	+11.14
Conservative	Paul Francis Smith	311	14.18	−2.47
Liberal Democrats	Roger Graham Norman	135	6.16	−10.13
BNP	Michael John Hamblin	112	5.11	−3.31
Green	Stephen Petter	108	4.92	+1.74
English Democrat	Barbara Ann Wright	92	4.20	+1.44
TUSC	Wayne Jefferson Coombes	35	1.60	N/A
Majority		1089	49.66	+13.61
Labour hold		Swing	+6.81	

=== Frome Vale ===
Bristol City Council Elections: Frome Vale Ward 2011
Party	Candidate	Votes	%	±%
Conservative	Lesley Ann Alexander	1,671	45.21	+8.11
Labour	Bill Payne	1,358	36.74	+8.90
Green	Nick Foster	243	6.57	−4.13
Liberal Democrats	Jason Budd	218	5.90	−7.39
English Democrat	Greg Shaw	136	3.68	N/A
TUSC	Mark Ian Baker	70	1.89	N/A
Majority		313	8.47	−0.79
Conservative hold		Swing	-0.40	

=== Hartcliffe ===
Bristol City Council Elections: Hartcliffe Ward 2011
Party	Candidate	Votes	%	±%
Labour	Mark Brain	1,500	55.80	+16.87
Conservative	Shirley Hodges	642	23.88	−3.11
English Democrat	Stephen Michael Wright	272	10.12	N/A
Liberal Democrats	Anne Pauline White	148	5.51	−16.97
Green	Patrick Slade	126	4.69	+1.58
Majority		858	31.92	+19.98
Labour hold		Swing	+9.99	

=== Hengrove ===
Bristol City Council Elections: Hengrove Ward 2011
Party	Candidate	Votes	%	±%
Labour	Barry Clark	1,331	37.55	+8.50
Conservative	George William Pendrill Maggs	1,010	28.49	−0.85
Liberal Democrats	Jos Clark	924	26.06	−12.56
English Democrat	Mike Blundell	189	5.33	N/A
Green	Graham Hugh Davey	91	2.57	−0.43
Majority		321	9.06	−0.17
Labour gain from Liberal Democrats		Swing	4.68	

=== Hillfields ===
Bristol City Council Elections: Hillfields Ward 2011
Party	Candidate	Votes	%	±%
Labour	Phil Hanby	1,537	44.86	+18.34
Liberal Democrats	Helene Louise Gibson	989	28.87	−8.55
Conservative	Barbara Madeleine Lewis	594	17.34	+2.27
Green	Rob Telford	202	5.90	−2.05
TUSC	Matt Gordon	104	3.04	N/A
Majority		548	15.99	+5.09
Labour hold		Swing	+13.45	

=== Knowle ===
Bristol City Council Elections: Knowle Ward 2011
Party	Candidate	Votes	%	±%
Liberal Democrats	Christopher Davies	1,413	39.14	−9.35
Labour	Gwyneth Brain	1,210	33.52	+9.09
Conservative	Graham David Morris	527	14.60	−0.59
Green	Glenn Royston Vowles	380	10.53	+3.58
TUSC	Domenico William Hill	80	2.22	N/A
Majority		203	5.62	−18.44
Liberal Democrats hold		Swing	-9.22	

=== Lawrence Hill ===
Bristol City Council Elections: Lawrence Hill Ward 2011
Party	Candidate	Votes	%	±%
Labour	Margaret Elizabeth Hickman	1,615	41.57	+10.04
Liberal Democrats	Abdul Malik	1,054	27.13	−4.09
Independent	Liiban Mohamed Abdi	458	11.79	N/A
Green	Christine Mary Prior	366	9.42	−3.00
Conservative	Charles William Alexander	322	8.29	−8.41
TUSC	Matthew Edward Carey	70	1.80	N/A
Majority		561	14.44	+14.13
Labour gain from Liberal Democrats		Swing	+7.07	

=== Southville ===
Bristol City Council Elections: Southville Ward 2011
Party	Candidate	Votes	%	±%
Labour	Sean David Beynon	1,856	43.34	+13.57
Green	Charles Nicholas Bolton	1,613	37.67	+3.84
Conservative	Adam Beda Tayler	499	11.65	+0.52
Liberal Democrats	Lena Wright	314	7.33	−17.94
Majority		561	14.44	+10.38
Labour hold		Swing	+4.87	

=== St George East ===
Bristol City Council Elections: St George East Ward 2011
Party	Candidate	Votes	%	±%
Labour	Fabian Breckels	1,739	50.10	+27.93
Conservative	Philip Hutton	1,102	31.75	−4.08
Liberal Democrats	Paul Elvin	306	8.82	−5.36
Green	Chloe Alice Somers	219	6.31	−4.12
TUSC	Mike Luff	105	3.03	N/A
Majority		637	18.35	+4.69
Labour hold		Swing	+16.01	

=== St George West ===
Bristol City Council Elections: St George West Ward 2011
Party	Candidate	Votes	%	±%
Labour	Peter Warren Hammond	1,346	42.04	+10.39
Liberal Democrats	Tony Potter	936	29.23	+0.81
Conservative	Sylvia Christine Windows	432	13.49	−1.98
Green	Genevieve Liveley	432	13.49	+3.09
English Democrat	Eddie Tranter	181	5.65	−0.91
TUSC	Bernie Lyons	78	2.44	N/A
Majority		410	12.81	+9.58
Labour gain from Liberal Democrats		Swing	+5.60	

=== Stockwood ===
Bristol City Council Elections: Stockwood Ward 2011
Party	Candidate	Votes	%	±%
Conservative	Jay Jethwa	1,606	47.10	+5.67
Labour	Yvonne Clapp	1,022	29.97	+3.30
Liberal Democrats	Michael Alan Goulden	426	12.49	−12.03
Green	Peter Anthony Goodwin	356	10.44	+3.05
Majority		584	17.13	+2.37
Conservative hold		Swing	+1.19	

=== Whitchurch Park ===
Bristol City Council Elections: Whitchurch Park Ward 2011
Party	Candidate	Votes	%	±%
Labour	Helen Holland	1,472	51.59	+13.46
Liberal Democrats	Lorraine Horgan	688	24.11	−15.27
Conservative	Jenny Rogers	449	15.74	+0.92
English Democrat	Ray Carr	154	5.40	N/A
Green	Barney Smith	90	3.15	+1.35
Majority		784	27.48	+26.23
Labour hold		Swing	+14.37	

=== Windmill Hill ===
Bristol City Council Elections: Windmill Hill Ward 2011
Party	Candidate	Votes	%	±%
Liberal Democrats	Mark Bailey	2,118	50.55	−1.28
Labour	Narraser Rochelle Gordon	1,086	25.92	+1.96
Green	Lex Cumber	588	14.03	+2.98
Conservative	Tony Lee	255	6.09	−4.31
TUSC	Tom Baldwin	143	3.41	N/A
Majority		1032	24.63	−3.24
Liberal Democrats hold		Swing	-1.62	
