= 2016 Bristol City Council election =

2016 local election in England

- 5 May 2016

All 70 seats to Bristol City Council 36 seats needed for a majority
	First party	Second party	Third party
Party	Labour	Conservative	Green
Seats won	37	14	11
Seat change	▲7	▼2	▼2
Popular vote	99,018	60,080	53,712
Percentage	36.6%	22.2%	19.9%
Swing	▲5.8%	▲1.0%	▼4.8%
	Fourth party	Fifth party
Party	Liberal Democrats	UKIP
Seats won	8	0
Seat change	▼2	▼1
Popular vote	45,811	6,828
Percentage	16.9%	2.5%
Swing	▲3.9%	▼6.0%
Council control before election
No Overall Control
Council control after election
Labour Party (UK)

The 2016 Bristol City Council election took place on Thursday 5 May 2016, alongside nationwide local elections. Following a boundary review, the number of wards in the city was reduced to 34, with each electing one, two or three Councillors. The overall number of Councillors remained 70, with all seats up for election at the same time. Elections would then be held every 4 years.

The Conservatives, Labour and the Liberal Democrats contested all 70 seats. The Green Party stood 59 candidates, TUSC 18, UKIP 10 and the Wessex Regionalists 1. There were also 8 Independent candidates.

Voters in the city were also voting in the 2016 Bristol Mayoral Election and the election for Avon and Somerset's Police and Crime Commissioner. Turnout across the city was high, with many wards recording over 50% turnout, and none recording less than 25%. Labour won a number of new seats and gained overall control of the council, whilst all other parties lost seats. UKIP lost their only Councillor.

This result had the following consequences for the total number of seats on the council after the elections:

Party	Previous council	New council	+/-
Labour	30	37	▲7
Conservatives	16	14	▼2
Greens	13	11	▼2
Liberal Democrats	10	8	▼2
UKIP	1	0	▼1
TUSC	0	0	0
Wessex Regionalists	0	0	0
Independent	0	0	0
Total	70	70	
Working majority	-10	4	

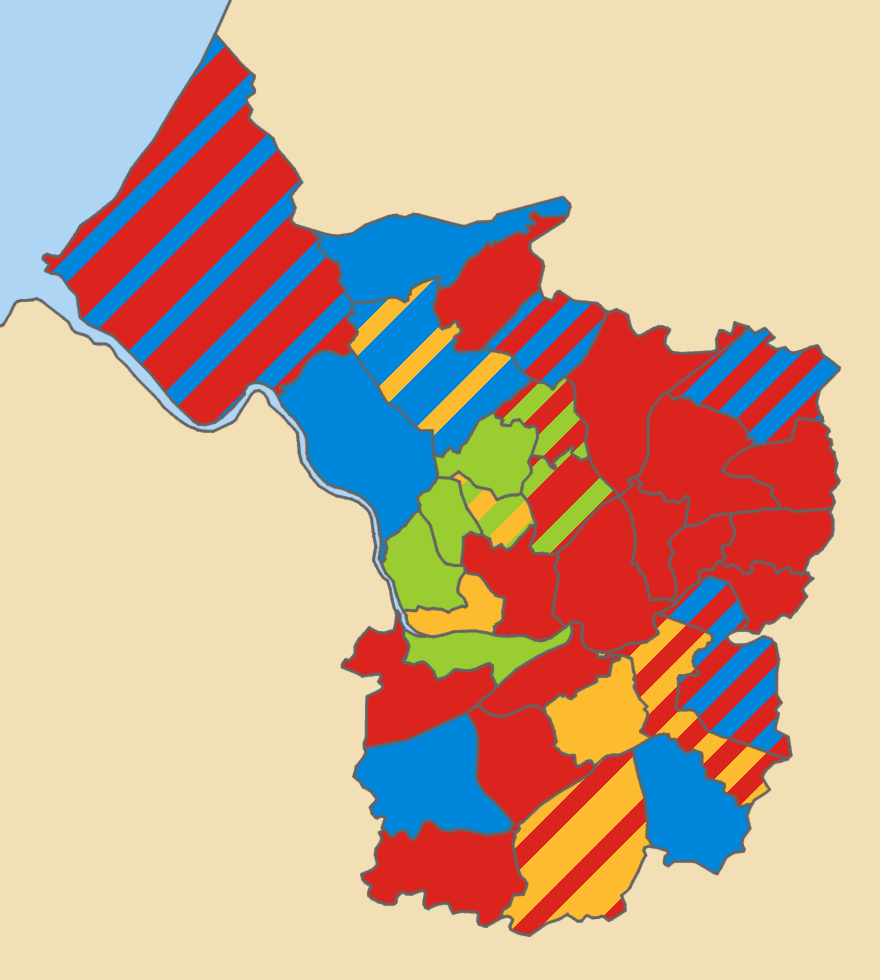
2016 local election results in Bristol

== Council Composition ==
Prior to the election the composition of the council was:

↓
30	16	13	10	1
Labour	Conservative	Green	Lib Dem	U

After the election the composition of the council was:

↓
37	14	11	8
Labour	Conservative	Green	Lib Dem

Lib Dem - Liberal Democrats
U - UK Independence Party (UKIP)

== Ward results ==
=== Ashley ===
Ashley (3 seats)
Party	Candidate	Votes	%	±%
Labour	Mike Davies	2,574	39.30	
Labour	Carole Johnson	2,571	39.26	
Green	Jude English	2,504	38.23	
Green	Gus Hoyt	2,351	35.90	
Labour	John Halpin	2,102	32.10	
Green	Simon Ingham Stafford-Townsend	1,959	29.91	
Liberal Democrats	Jon Rogers	1,239	18.92	
Liberal Democrats	Maya Sturtridge	678	10.35	
Liberal Democrats	Adam Sturtridge	569	8.69	
TUSC	Chris Farrell	411	6.28	
Conservative	Marcus Bruton	227	3.47	
Conservative	George Pendrill Maggs	188	2.87	
Conservative	Fi Riches	180	2.75	
Turnout		6,549	51.38	
Labour win (new seat)				
Labour win (new seat)				
Green win (new seat)				

=== Avonmouth & Lawrence Weston ===
Avonmouth & Lawrence Weston (3 seats)
Party	Candidate	Votes	%	±%
Labour	Don Alexander	2,110	35.40	
Conservative	Matt Melias	1,901	31.90	
Labour	Jo Sergeant	1,475	24.75	
Labour	Jerry Williams	1,214	20.37	
Conservative	Darien Jay	1,199	20.12	
Conservative	Henry Michallat	1,105	18.54	
UKIP	Michael Frost	872	14.63	
Liberal Democrats	Timothy Leaman	827	13.88	
UKIP	Claire Frost	812	13.62	
Liberal Democrats	Darren Moore	573	9.61	
Liberal Democrats	Wendie Smith	553	9.28	
Independent	John Geater	550	9.23	
Independent	Duncan Laurence	479	8.04	
Green	Geoff Collard	351	5.89	
Green	Don Brown	347	5.82	
Green	Mo McManus	317	5.32	
Independent	Steve Norman	193	3.24	
Turnout		5,960	38.94	
Labour win (new seat)				
Conservative win (new seat)				
Labour win (new seat)				

=== Bedminster ===
Bedminster (2 seats)
Party	Candidate	Votes	%	±%
Labour	Mark Bradshaw	2,452	51.44	
Labour	Celia Phipps	1,756	36.84	
Green	Will Quick	1,390	29.04	
Green	Glenn Vowles	926	19.43	
Conservative	Richard Clifton	652	13.68	
Conservative	Judith Gordon-Nichols	569	11.94	
Liberal Democrats	Matt Ellis	360	7.55	
Liberal Democrats	Peter Main	160	3.36	
TUSC	Frankie Langeland	139	2.92	
Turnout		4,767	50.28	
Labour hold		Swing		
Labour hold		Swing		

=== Bishopston & Ashley Down ===
Bishopston & Ashley Down (2 seats)
Party	Candidate	Votes	%	±%
Labour	Tom Brook	1,833	36.57	
Green	Eleanor Combley	1,755	35.02	
Green	Daniella Radice	1,745	34.82	
Labour	Dave McLeod	1,278	25.50	
Liberal Democrats	Rebecca Lockyer	937	18.70	
Liberal Democrats	Kate Bowman	905	18.06	
Conservative	David Harrison Lewis	423	8.44	
Conservative	Pat Wyatt	343	6.84	
Turnout		5,012	56.95	
Labour win (new seat)				
Green win (new seat)				

=== Bishopsworth ===
Bishopsworth (2 seats)
Party	Candidate	Votes	%	±%
Conservative	Richard Eddy	2,033	55.76	
Conservative	Kevin Quartley	1,378	37.79	
Labour	Alison Penders	952	26.11	
Labour	Mick O'Neill-Duff	792	21.72	
Green	Rory Casey	336	9.22	
Green	Martin Grant	305	8.37	
Liberal Democrats	Mary Sykes	240	6.58	
Liberal Democrats	Gareth Owen	121	3.32	
Turnout		3,646	40.82	
Conservative hold		Swing		
Conservative hold		Swing		

=== Brislington East ===
Brislington East (2 seats)
Party	Candidate	Votes	%	±%
Labour	Mike Langley	1,370	38.28	
Conservative	Tony Carey	1,208	33.75	
Conservative	Perry Hicks	1,072	29.95	
Labour	Mike Wollacott	1,060	29.62	
Green	Lisa Clarke	439	12.27	
Green	Gabor Valter	389	10.87	
Liberal Democrats	Jim Hodgson	342	9.56	
Liberal Democrats	Andrew Varney	323	9.02	
Turnout		3,579	40.42	
Labour hold		Swing		
Conservative gain from Labour		Swing		

=== Brislington West ===
Brislington West (2 seats)
Party	Candidate	Votes	%	±%
Liberal Democrats	Jos Clark	1,563	40.39	
Labour	Harriet Bradley	1,281	33.10	
Labour	Eileen Means	909	23.49	
Liberal Democrats	John Kiely	818	21.14	
Green	Natasha Clarke	689	17.80	
Conservative	Owen Evans	493	12.74	
Conservative	Nick Hiscott	484	12.51	
Green	Sarah Greenwood	454	11.73	
Turnout		3,870	45.55	
Liberal Democrats gain from Labour		Swing		
Labour hold		Swing		

=== Central ===
Central (2 seats)
Party	Candidate	Votes	%	±%
Labour	Kye Dudd	1,051	40.38	
Labour	Paul Smith	849	32.62	
Green	Ani Stafford-Townsend	842	32.35	
Green	Rob Telford	635	24.39	
Liberal Democrats	Pauline Allen	364	13.98	
Conservative	Suzi Best	360	13.83	
Liberal Democrats	Sylvia Doubell	328	12.60	
Conservative	Ann Pulteney	318	12.22	
Turnout		2,603	35.50	
Labour win (new seat)				
Labour win (new seat)				

=== Clifton ===
Clifton (2 seats)
Party	Candidate	Votes	%	±%
Green	Paula O'Rourke	1,793	36.62	
Green	Jerome Thomas	1,608	32.84	
Conservative	Charles Lucas	1,486	30.35	
Labour	Aidan Curran	1,123	22.94	
Conservative	Chris Morton	1,058	21.61	
Labour	Kamlesh Vyas	734	14.99	
Liberal Democrats	Merche Clark	712	14.54	
Liberal Democrats	Thomas Walkington	411	8.39	
Turnout		4,896	52.24	
Green hold		Swing		
Green gain from Conservative		Swing		

=== Clifton Down ===
Clifton Down (2 seats)
Party	Candidate	Votes	%	±%
Green	Carla Denyer	1,255	33.43	
Green	Clive Stevens	1,001	26.66	
Labour	Philip Jardine	991	26.40	
Conservative	Sarah Cleave	775	20.64	
Labour	Satnam Singh*	766	20.40	
Liberal Democrats	Tom Stubbs	673	17.93	
Conservative	Steve Smith	665	17.71	
Liberal Democrats	Joshua Warwick-Smith	606	16.14	
Independent	Dawn Parry	273	7.27	
Turnout		3,754	47.49	
Green win (new seat)				
Green win (new seat)				

*On 22 April 2016, it was announced that Satnam Singh had been suspended from the Labour Party for failing to disclose prior convictions for selling illegal tobacco and drugs. As the nominations process had already been completed, it was too late for Labour to nominate a new candidate or withdraw Mr Singh from the ballot.

=== Cotham ===
Cotham (2 seats)
Party	Candidate	Votes	%	±%
Green	Cleo Lake	1,338	34.07	
Liberal Democrats	Anthony Negus	1,215	30.94	
Labour	Sue Milestone	1,163	29.62	
Green	Guy Poultney	1,141	29.06	
Labour	Jack Patterson	917	23.35	
Liberal Democrats	Miles Taylor	830	21.14	
Conservative	Sarah Haydon	434	11.05	
Conservative	Stephanie Jones	325	8.28	
Turnout		3,927	50.82	
Green hold		Swing		
Liberal Democrats hold		Swing		

=== Easton ===
Easton (2 seats)
Party	Candidate	Votes	%	±%
Labour	Afzal Hussain Shah	1,964	39.71	
Labour	Ruth Mawnan Pickersgill	1,946	39.34	
Green	Anna McMullen	1,760	35.58	
Green	Tamara Zoe Marie Evans Braun	1,696	34.29	
Liberal Democrats	Thomas Charles Gordon Oliver	317	6.41	
Liberal Democrats	Christopher James Featonby	290	5.86	
Conservative	Will Luangarth	222	4.49	
Independent	Jane Marjory Westhead	208	4.21	
Conservative	Nura Aabe	178	3.60	
TUSC	Philip John Bishop	149	3.01	
Turnout		4,946	51.30	
Labour hold		Swing		
Labour gain from Green		Swing		

=== Eastville ===
Eastville (2 seats)
Party	Candidate	Votes	%	±%
Labour	Mahmadur Rahman Khan	2,245	52.15	
Labour	Mhairi Louise Threlfall	1,991	46.25	
Green	Gabrielle Tslotta Lobb	725	16.84	
Conservative	Roy Towler	645	14.98	
Liberal Democrats	Christopher John Harris	627	14.56	
Conservative	Justyna Kinga Papciak	419	9.73	
Liberal Democrats	Amy Caitlin Skrobanska Stuart	305	7.08	
TUSC	Mark Ian Baker	282	6.55	
Wessex Regionalists	Nick Xylas	62	1.44	
Turnout		4,305	44.46	
Labour hold		Swing		
Labour hold		Swing		

=== Filwood ===
Filwood (2 seats)
Party	Candidate	Votes	%	±%
Labour	Christopher David Jackson	1,616	60.30	
Labour	Jeff Lovell	1,276	47.61	
Green	Makala Claire Cheung	411	15.34	
Conservative	Sylvia Christine Windows	273	10.19	
Conservative	Anthony Kwan	237	8.84	
Liberal Democrats	Paula Frances Nixon	231	8.62	
TUSC	Robin Victor Clapp	221	8.25	
Liberal Democrats	Jackie Norman	134	5.00	
TUSC	Anthony Brian Rowe	124	4.63	
Turnout		2,680	29.42	
Labour hold		Swing		
Labour hold		Swing		

=== Frome Vale ===
Frome Vale (2 seats)
Party	Candidate	Votes	%	±%
Conservative	Lesley Ann Alexander	1,744	42.52	
Labour	Nicola Jane Bowden-Jones	1,537	37.47	
Conservative	James Charles Hinchcliffe	1,320	32.18	
Labour	Bill Payne	1,256	30.62	
Green	Cath Thomas	618	15.07	
Green	Paul Masri	387	9.43	
Liberal Democrats	John Patrick Hassell	240	5.85	
Liberal Democrats	Benjamin Goldstrom	156	3.80	
Turnout		4,102	45.14	
Conservative hold		Swing		
Labour hold		Swing		

=== Hartcliffe & Withywood ===
Hartcliffe & Withywood (3 seats)
Party	Candidate	Votes	%	±%
Labour	Mark Royston Brain	1,812	52.63	
Labour	Helen Holland	1,706	49.55	
Labour	Paul Goggin	1,370	39.79	
UKIP	Robert John Coxon	1,008	29.28	
Conservative	Jonathan Robert Hucker	529	15.36	
Conservative	Nadeem Ashraf	418	12.14	
Conservative	Jonathan David Russell	387	11.24	
Green	Andrew John Lawrence	382	11.09	
Liberal Democrats	Michael Alan Goulden	164	4.76	
TUSC	Robert Anthony Nash	159	4.62	
Liberal Democrats	Samuel Frederick Michael Head	118	3.43	
Liberal Democrats	Paul Elvin	109	3.17	
Turnout		3,443	27.31	
Labour win (new seat)				
Labour win (new seat)				
Labour win (new seat)				

=== Henbury & Brentry ===
Henbury & Brentry (2 seats)
Party	Candidate	Votes	%	±%
Conservative	Mark David Roscoe Weston	1,763	48.42	
Conservative	Chris Windows	1,420	39.00	
Labour	Kerry Barker	1,243	34.14	
Labour	Kathleen Rosalie Walker	987	27.11	
Green	Lela Helen McTernan	324	8.90	
Liberal Democrats	Sterling Dresman	245	6.73	
Green	Robert James Alexander Triggs	203	5.58	
Liberal Democrats	Christian Adam Martin	174	4.78	
Turnout		3,641	39.73	
Conservative win (new seat)				
Conservative win (new seat)				

=== Hengrove & Whitchurch Park ===
Hengrove & Whitchurch Park (3 seats)
Party	Candidate	Votes	%	±%
Liberal Democrats	Tim Kent	2,526	46.75	
Labour	Barry David Clark	1,763	32.63	
Liberal Democrats	Harriet Eva Clough	1,637	30.30	
Liberal Democrats	Nigel Joseph Emery	1,459	27.00	
Labour	Esther Lucia Keller	905	16.75	
UKIP	June Pamela Mitchell	905	16.75	
Labour	Hadleigh Vaughan Roberts	798	14.77	
UKIP	Daniel Matthew Fear	747	13.83	
Conservative	Ann-Marie Mason	700	12.96	
UKIP	Paul Anthony Turner	625	11.57	
Conservative	Antony Skelding	549	10.16	
Conservative	Sam Perrin	539	9.98	
Green	Barney Smith	258	4.78	
Turnout		5,403	39.67	
Liberal Democrats win (new seat)				
Labour win (new seat)				
Liberal Democrats win (new seat)				

=== Hillfields ===
Hillfields (2 seats)
Party	Candidate	Votes	%	±%
Labour	Craig Cheney	1,550	46.24	
Labour	Anna Louise Keen	1,375	41.02	
UKIP	Matt Pitts	582	17.36	
Conservative	Prasad John	507	15.13	
Green	Rick Lovering	462	13.78	
Conservative	Pearl Christine Lavinia Abraham	389	11.61	
Independent	Phil Hanby	292	8.71	
Liberal Democrats	Roland Julian Harmer	179	5.34	
Liberal Democrats	Andrew John Morgan	121	3.61	
TUSC	Roger Stephen Thomas	75	2.24	
Turnout		3,352	38.42	
Labour hold		Swing		
Labour hold		Swing		

=== Horfield ===
Horfield (2 seats)
Party	Candidate	Votes	%	±%
Labour	Olly Mead	1,626	40.19	
Conservative	Claire Michelle Hiscott	1,195	29.54	
Labour	Teresa Stratford	1,194	29.51	
Conservative	Nigel John Currie	1,149	28.40	
Green	Christopher John Waller	623	15.40	
Green	Ian Edward Moss	580	14.34	
Liberal Democrats	Ian Humfrey Campion-Smith	389	9.61	
Liberal Democrats	Luke Walton	299	7.39	
Turnout		4,046	43.62	
Labour hold		Swing		
Conservative hold		Swing		

=== Hotwells & Harbourside ===
Hotwells & Harbourside (1 seat)
Party	Candidate	Votes	%	±%
Liberal Democrats	Mark Wright	609	33.67	
Green	Chris Millman	441	24.38	
Labour	Ted Fowler	400	22.11	
Conservative	Iain Jenkins Dennis	284	15.70	
Independent	Tim Collins	47	2.60	
TUSC	Ian Christopher Quick	28	1.55	
Turnout		1,826	46.40	
Liberal Democrats win (new seat)				

=== Knowle ===
Knowle (2 seats)
Party	Candidate	Votes	%	±%
Liberal Democrats	Gary Hopkins	2,177	48.08	
Liberal Democrats	Chris Davies	2,154	47.57	
Labour	Thomas James Cottrell	1,336	29.51	
Labour	Carolyn Magson	1,029	22.73	
Green	Anna Harriet Jordan	515	11.37	
Green	Heather Jenny Mack	336	7.42	
Conservative	Debra Ann Jones	268	5.92	
Conservative	Jenny Rogers	242	5.34	
TUSC	Domenico William Hill	92	2.03	
TUSC	Patrick Dorian	70	1.55	
Turnout		4,528	46.83	
Liberal Democrats hold		Swing		
Liberal Democrats hold		Swing		

=== Lawrence Hill ===
Lawrence Hill (2 seats)
Party	Candidate	Votes	%	±%
Labour	Margaret Elizabeth Hickman	2,130	54.63	
Labour	Hibaq Jama	2,000	51.30	
Green	Jonathan Charles Philip Eccles	732	18.77	
Green	Isaac David	654	16.77	
Conservative	Charles William Alexander	281	7.21	
Liberal Democrats	Christian Barrow	270	6.92	
Liberal Democrats	Ryan Lailvaux	187	4.80	
TUSC	Giovanni Russo	120	3.08	
Conservative	Bador Uddin	120	3.08	
Turnout		3,899	40.99	
Labour hold		Swing		
Labour hold		Swing		

=== Lockleaze ===
Lockleaze (2 seats)
Party	Candidate	Votes	%	±%
Labour	Gill Kirk	1,835	53.36	
Labour	Estella Jane Tincknell	1,560	45.36	
Green	David Wilcox	669	19.45	
Conservative	Nathan William George Fairhurst	555	16.14	
Conservative	Cynthia Fleming	404	11.75	
Liberal Democrats	Leslie James Cooper	293	8.52	
Liberal Democrats	Rebecca Hutcheon	266	7.73	
TUSC	Andrew Mark Pryor	230	6.69	
Turnout		3,439	40.06	
Labour hold		Swing		
Labour hold		Swing		

=== Redland ===
Redland (2 seats)
Party	Candidate	Votes	%	±%
Green	Martin Stephen Fodor	2,158	38.29	
Green	Fi Hance	2,144	38.04	
Labour	Warwick Everett-Rimmer	1,654	29.35	
Labour	Abdur Rashid	1,240	22.00	
Conservative	Mark Graham Balchin	871	15.45	
Conservative	Dick Manns	793	14.07	
Liberal Democrats	Crispin Toby John Allard	783	13.89	
Liberal Democrats	Glenise Sweeting Morgan	730	12.95	
Turnout		5,636	56.94	
Green hold		Swing		
Green gain from Liberal Democrats		Swing		

=== Southmead ===
Southmead (2 seats)
Party	Candidate	Votes	%	±%
Labour	Brenda Margaret Massey	1,461	47.30	
Labour	Helen Godwin Teige	1,330	43.06	
UKIP	Tony Orr	482	15.60	
Conservative	Gill Bodey	477	15.44	
Conservative	Dave Kibble	385	12.46	
UKIP	Victoria Orr	371	12.01	
Liberal Democrats	Gillian Mary Brown	309	10.00	
Liberal Democrats	Evaline Anne Johnstone	275	8.90	
Green	Isaac Price-Sosner	269	8.71	
Turnout		3,089	35.53	
Labour hold		Swing		
Labour hold		Swing		

=== Southville ===
Southville (2 seats)
Party	Candidate	Votes	%	±%
Green	Charles Nicholas Bolton	2,197	45.98	
Green	Stephen Clarke	1,762	36.88	
Labour	Robert Mark Massey	1,746	36.54	
Labour	Fred Jerrome	1,641	34.34	
Conservative	James Andrew Hale Stevenson	491	10.28	
Conservative	Ellie Villa-Vercella	325	6.80	
Liberal Democrats	Lena Clare Wright	282	5.90	
Liberal Democrats	Richard Francis Rankin	206	4.31	
TUSC	Matthew Edward Carey	147	3.08	
Turnout		4,778	53.20	
Green hold		Swing		
Green hold		Swing		

=== St George Central ===
St George Central (2 seats)
Party	Candidate	Votes	%	±%
Labour	Nicola Anne Beech	1,855	54.16	
Labour	Steve Pearce	1,207	35.24	
Conservative	Tony Lee	636	18.57	
Conservative	Kris Murphy	625	18.25	
Green	Ruby Alice Gabrielle Tucker	504	14.72	
Liberal Democrats	Andy Crow	342	9.99	
Liberal Democrats	Jillian Anita Gettrup	319	9.31	
TUSC	Wayne Jefferson Coombes	201	5.87	
Turnout		3,425	36.35	
Labour win (new seat)				
Labour win (new seat)				

=== St George Troopers Hill ===
St George Troopers Hill (1 seat)
Party	Candidate	Votes	%	±%
Labour	Fabian Guy Breckels	918	47.22	
Conservative	Kevin Robert Rainey	648	33.33	
Green	Sean Buchan	170	8.74	
Liberal Democrats	Nicholas John Coombes	134	6.89	
TUSC	Mike Luff	74	3.81	
Turnout		1,983	44.26	
Labour win (new seat)				

=== St George West ===
St George West (1 seat)
Party	Candidate	Votes	%	±%
Labour	Asher Craig	913	42.25	
Green	Lorraine Francis	421	19.48	
Liberal Democrats	Ian James Townsend	400	18.51	
Independent	Tony Potter	196	9.07	
Conservative	James Henry Oswald Roughton	171	7.91	
TUSC	Bernie Lyons	60	2.78	
Turnout		2,188	46.00	
Labour win (new seat)				

=== Stockwood ===
Stockwood (2 seats)
Party	Candidate	Votes	%	±%
Conservative	Steve Jones	1,613	42.80	
Conservative	Graham David Morris	1,599	42.43	
Labour	Jenny Smith	1,237	32.82	
Labour	Robert Austen Phoenix	1,127	29.90	
Green	Kerry Ann Vosper	315	8.36	
Green	Peter Anthony Goodwin	277	7.35	
Liberal Democrats	Lucy Woodman	194	5.15	
Liberal Democrats	Alexander William Woodman	170	4.51	
Turnout		3,769	41.24	
Conservative hold		Swing		
Conservative hold		Swing		

=== Stoke Bishop ===
Stoke Bishop (2 seats)
Party	Candidate	Votes	%	±%
Conservative	John Goulandris	2,329	50.60	
Conservative	Peter John Abraham	2,006	43.58	
Labour	Brian Peter Mead	735	15.97	
Liberal Democrats	Gillian Evelyn Donald	636	13.82	
Labour	Dilawer Singh Potiwal	594	12.90	
Liberal Democrats	Sylvia Jeanne Townsend	541	11.75	
Green	Freya Esme Dodd	461	10.02	
UKIP	Mike Boyle	424	9.21	
Green	Nathan Haines	327	7.10	
Turnout		4,603	51.65	
Conservative hold		Swing		
Conservative hold		Swing		

=== Westbury-on-Trym & Henleaze ===
Westbury-on-Trym & Henleaze (3 seats)
Party	Candidate	Votes	%	±%
Conservative	Geoff Gollop	4,019	44.03	
Conservative	Liz Radford	3,683	40.35	
Liberal Democrats	Clare Campion-Smith	3,277	35.90	
Conservative	Alastair Peter Lindsay Watson	3,207	35.14	
Liberal Democrats	Helen Jessica Cuellar	2,382	26.10	
Liberal Democrats	Graham Christopher Donald	1,887	20.67	
Labour	Lesley Miranda McCabe	1,589	17.41	
Green	Sharmila Elizabeth Bousa	1,305	14.30	
Labour	Jon Moore	1,232	13.50	
Labour	Barry Thompson Trahar	1,230	13.48	
Green	George Simon Calascione	820	8.98	
Turnout		9,127	60.56	
Conservative win (new seat)				
Conservative win (new seat)				
Liberal Democrats win (new seat)				

=== Windmill Hill ===
Windmill Hill (2 seats)
Party	Candidate	Votes	%	±%
Labour	Lucy Whittle	1,844	36.74	
Labour	Jon Wellington	1,692	33.71	
Green	Rosa Isabelle Targett	1,597	31.82	
Green	Eleanor Rosie Vowles	1,339	26.68	
Liberal Democrats	Andrew Charles Brown	1,034	20.60	
Liberal Democrats	Natalie Ann Jester	877	17.47	
Conservative	David Morris	331	6.59	
Conservative	Pam Skelding	258	5.14	
TUSC	Tom Baldwin	245	4.88	
Turnout		5,019	50.99	
Labour hold		Swing		
Labour gain from Green		Swing		
