= Bristol City Council =

Unitary authority in England

- Coat of arms

- Council logo

Type
- Type: Unitary authority

Leadership
- Lord Mayor: Yassin Mohamud, Green since 12 May 2026
- Leader: Tony Dyer, Green since 21 May 2024
- Chief Executive: Nick Hibberd since 6 January 2025

Structure
- Seats: 70 councillors
- Political groups: Administration (43) Green (34) Liberal Democrats (9) Other parties (27) Labour (19) Conservative (7) Independent (1)
- Joint committees: West of England Combined Authority
- Length of term: 4 years

Elections
- Voting system: Plurality-at-large
- Last election: 2 May 2024
- Next election: 4 May 2028

Motto
- Virtute et Industria (By Virtue and Industry)

Meeting place
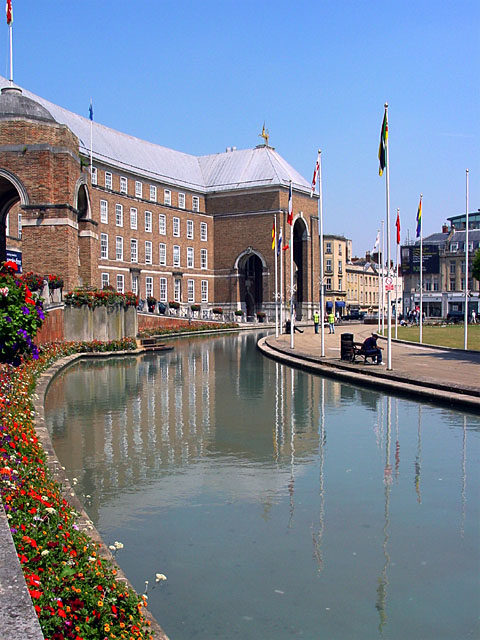
- City Hall, College Green, Bristol, BS1 5TR

Website
- www.bristol.gov.uk

Bristol City Council is the local authority for the city of Bristol, in South West England. Bristol has had a council from medieval times, which has been reformed on numerous occasions. Since 1996 the council has been a unitary authority, being a district council which also performs the functions of a county council. Bristol has also formed its own ceremonial county since 1996. Since 2017 the council has been a member of the West of England Combined Authority.

The council has been under no overall control since 2021. Following the 2024 election the Green Party was the largest party. Green councillor Tony Dyer was appointed leader of the council, and committee chair positions were shared amongst the Greens and Liberal Democrats. The council is based at City Hall on College Green.

== History ==
Bristol was an ancient borough. Its date of becoming a borough is not known; its earliest known charter was issued by Henry II around 1164. The borough had a mayor from at least 1216.

The early borough was entirely in Gloucestershire, being on the north side of the original course of the River Avon, which formed the county boundary with Somerset. From the 13th century the borough boundaries were extended to include the Redcliffe area on the south side of river. In recognition of the town's growing importance, and also to avoid the administrative problems caused by the borough straddling two counties, in 1373 the borough was made a county corporate with its own sheriff. Bristol became a city on the creation of the Diocese of Bristol in 1542.

Bristol was reformed to become a municipal borough in 1836 under the Municipal Corporations Act 1835, which standardised how most boroughs operated across the country. It was then governed by a body formally called the "mayor, aldermen and burgesses of the city of Bristol", which was generally known as the corporation or city council. The city boundaries were enlarged on numerous occasions.

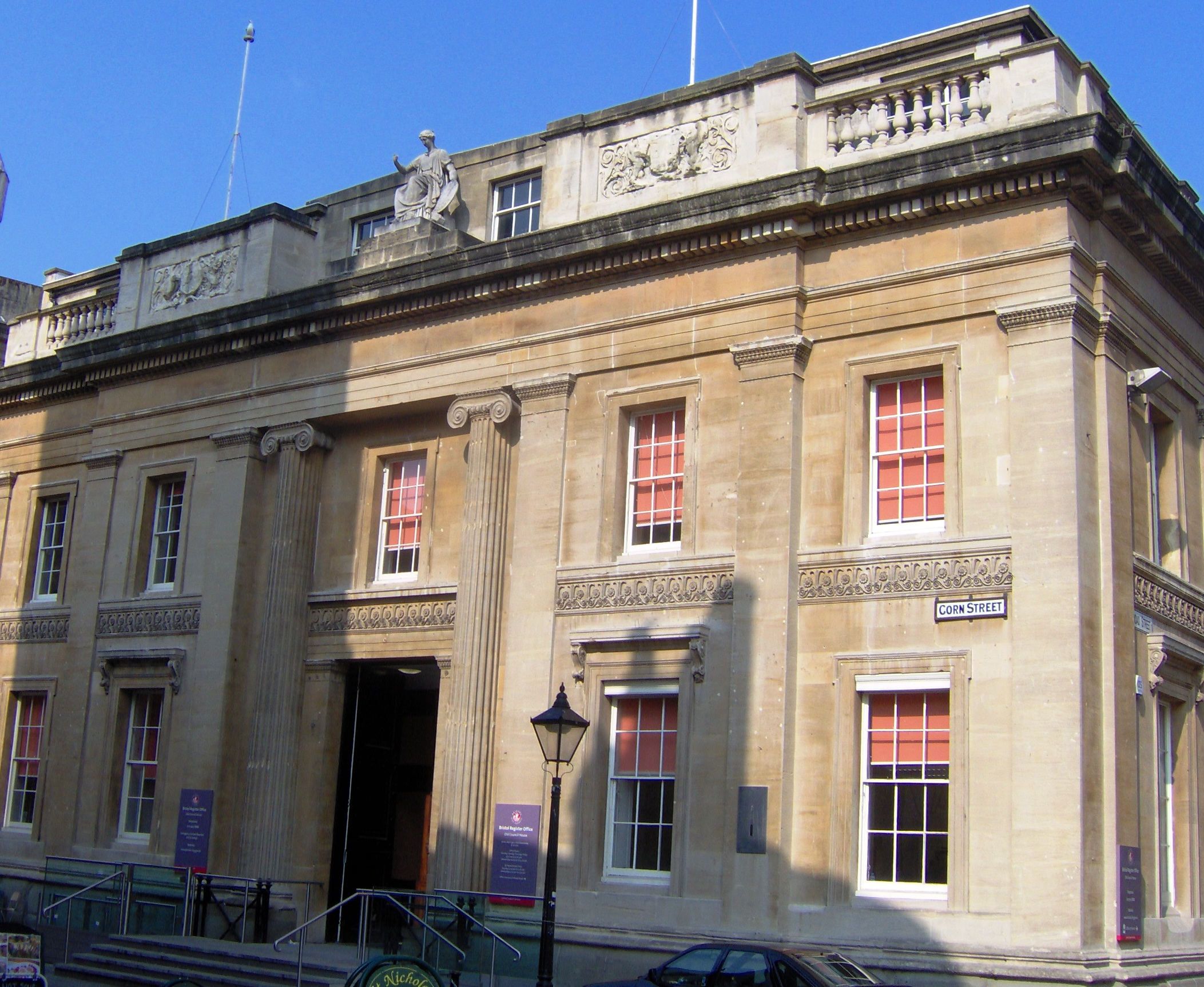
Old Council House: Council's meeting place 1827–1952

When elected county councils were established in 1889, Bristol became a county borough, with the council taking responsibility for county-level functions that would otherwise have fallen to a county council to provide. In 1899 the city's mayor was raised to the status of a lord mayor.

Local government was reformed in 1974 under the Local Government Act 1972. Bristol kept the same boundaries (which had last been expanded in 1966) but was reconstituted as a non-metropolitan district and placed in the new county of Avon, with county-level functions passing to the Avon County Council. Bristol's borough and city statuses and its lord mayoralty were all transferred to the new district and its council, which took the name Bristol City Council.

In 1996 the county of Avon and its council were abolished, and Bristol City Council gained responsibility for county-level services. The way this change was legally implemented was to create a new non-metropolitan county of Bristol covering the same area as the existing district, but with no separate county council; instead the existing city council took on county functions, making it a unitary authority. This therefore restored the city council to the powers it had held when Bristol was a county borough prior to 1974. As a consequence of being made a non-metropolitan county, the ceremonial position of Lord Lieutenant of Bristol was also created in 1996.

Following a referendum in 2012, the council was led by a directly elected mayor. The position was known as the Mayor of Bristol; it was distinct from the more ceremonial position of Lord Mayor. The mayor exercised executive powers and chose councillors to sit in a cabinet. It was decided via another referendum in 2022 to abolish the directly elected mayor's position, which took effect following the 2024 election. Since then, the council has been run by a committee system, with a leader of the council as its political leader instead.

A combined authority was established in 2017 covering Bristol and the neighbouring Bath and North East Somerset and South Gloucestershire areas, called the West of England Combined Authority. It is chaired by the directly elected Mayor of the West of England.

== Governance ==
Bristol City Council provides both district-level and county-level functions. There are no civil parishes in the city, but the city council runs nine area committees to discuss local matters.

=== Political control ===
The council has been under no overall control since 2021. The Green Party became the largest party following a by-election in February 2023, but until the ending of the mayoral system in May 2024 the council continued to be led by the Labour mayor, Marvin Rees, and the cabinet he chose. Following the 2024 election the Green Party increased their number of seats, but remained two seats short of having an overall majority. Green councillor Tony Dyer was subsequently appointed leader of the council and chair of the co-ordinating Strategy and Resources Policy Committee. Other policy committee chair positions were shared amongst the Greens and Liberal Democrats.

Political control of the council since the 1974 reforms took effect has been as follows:

Lower tier non-metropolitan district

Party in control	Years
Labour	1974–1983
No overall control	1983–1986
Labour	1986–1996

Unitary authority

Party in control	Years
Labour	1996–2003
No overall control	2003–2009
Liberal Democrats	2009–2011
No overall control	2011–2016
Labour	2016–2016
No overall control	2016–2016
Labour	2016–2021
No overall control	2021–present

=== Leadership ===
Leader of the council (until 2012)
Councillor	Party	From	To
Charles Merrett	Labour	1 Apr 1974	9 May 1978
Claude Draper	Labour	May 1978	May 1983
Bob Wall	Conservative	May 1983	May 1984
Graham Robertson	Labour	May 1984	May 1997
George Micklewright	Labour	May 1997	May 2002
Diane Bunyan	Labour	May 2002	3 May 2003
Peter Hammond (acting)	Labour	3 May 2003	15 June 2003
Barbara Janke	Liberal Democrats	17 Jun 2003	9 Nov 2004
Peter Hammond	Labour	9 Nov 2004	May 2005
Barbara Janke	Liberal Democrats	May 2005	15 May 2007
Helen Holland	Labour	22 May 2007	24 Feb 2009
Barbara Janke	Liberal Democrats	24 Feb 2009	15 May 2012
Simon Cook	Liberal Democrats	15 May 2012	18 Nov 2012

Directly elected mayor (2012–2024)
Mayor	Party	From	To
George Ferguson	Independent	19 Nov 2012	8 May 2016
Marvin Rees	Labour	9 May 2016	5 May 2024

Leader of the council (since 2024)
Councillor	Party	From	To
Tony Dyer	Green	21 May 2024	

=== Composition ===
Following the 2024 election the composition of the council was:

Party	Councillors
Green	34
Labour	21
Liberal Democrats	8
Conservative	7
Total	70

The next election is due in May 2028.

== Elections ==
Since the last boundary changes in 2016 the council has comprised 70 councillors representing 34 wards, with each ward electing one, two or three councillors. Elections are held every four years.

== Premises ==
The council meets and has its main offices at City Hall on College Green. The building was purpose-built for the council. Construction began in the 1930s but was paused due to the Second World War. The building would be completed in 1952. It was called the 'Council House' until 2012, when it was renamed 'City Hall'.

Prior to 1952, the council met at the Old Council House on Corn Street, which had been completed in 1827.

== Bristol City Youth Council ==
The Bristol City Youth Council (BCYC) are an elected group of young people aged 11 to 18. Members are voted for in the Bristol Big Youth Vote, which takes place in schools, with students voting. The constituencies for Youth Council are divided into Bristol North, Bristol East Central, and Bristol South, with each area having eight members. This is in addition to several co-optees from special representation groups such as Young Carers, Unity Youth, and the Children in Care Council.

The purpose of the Youth Council is to express young people's views on the decisions that are important to them and that their opinions are voiced and heard. They also run internal and external campaigns

The Youth Council also internally elects two members of youth parliament (MYP), and two youth mayors.

== See also ==
- History of Bristol City Council
- Politics of Bristol
- Mansion House, Bristol
